= Bassnectar discography =

Discography of American DJ Bassnectar

- Studio albums: 13
- EPs: 10
- Singles: 30
- Mixtapes: 23

This is the discography of American DJ Bassnectar.

== Studio albums ==
Year	Album	Peak positions	
Year	Album	US	US Dance
2003	Motions of Mutation	—	—
2004	Diverse Systems of Throb	—	—
2005	Mesmerizing The Ultra	—	—
2007	Underground Communication	—	—
2009	Cozza Frenzy	—	24
2011	Divergent Spectrum	42	2
2012	Vava Voom	34	2
2014	Noise vs. Beauty	21	1
2015	Into the Sun	46	1
2016	Unlimited	49	1
2020	All Colors	25	4
2023	The Golden Rule	—	—
2024	No Colors	—	—
2025	Relive Forever		
"—" denotes an album that did not chart or was not released.

== Extended plays ==
Year	Title	Peak positions		
Year	Title	US	US Dance	US Heat.
2005	Everybody	—	—	—
2006	Blue State Riddim	—	—	—
2008	Heads Up	—	—	—
2009	Art of Revolution	—	—	—
2010	Timestretch	—	19	47
2010	Wildstyle	102	3	1
2012	Freestyle	79	3	—
2013	Take You Down	—	—	—
2017	Reflective	74	5	—
2017	Reflective Part 2	—	8	—
2018	Reflective Part 3	78	7	—
2019	Reflective Part 4	—	13	—
2024	A Strange World	—	—	—
2024	Nice & Easy Remixes	—	—	—
2024	Rewind The Track	—	—	—
"—" denotes an extended play that did not chart or was not released.

== Singles ==
=== As lead artist ===
Year	Title	Album	Peak positions	
Year	Title	Album	US Dance	US Dance Sales
2002	"Float"	Non-album single	—	—
2004	"Creation Lullaby"	Diverse Systems of Throb	—	—
2005	"Booty Line/California Sunrise"	Non-album single	—	—
2005	"Taurine Thruster"	Motions of Mutation	—	—
2005	"Everybody"	Mesmerizing The Ultra	—	—
2006	"Blue State Riddim"	Mesmerizing The Ultra	—	—
2007	"Yo" (featuring Kristina Maria)	Underground Communication	—	—
2007	"Bomb Tha Blocks" (featuring Persia)	Underground Communication	—	—
2008	"Viva Tibet" (produced with Freq Nasty	Non-album singles	—	—
2009	"Land of the Lupes"	Non-album singles	—	—
2010	"Here We Go"	Timestretch EP	—	—
2010	"Bass Head"	Timestretch EP	—	24
2010	"Magical World" (featuring Nelly Furtado)	Non-album single	—	—
2010	"Wildstyle Method"	Wildstyle EP	—	—
2011	"Upside Down"	Divergent Spectrum	—	—
2011	"The Matrix"	Divergent Spectrum	—	33
2011	"Above and Beyond" (with Seth Drake)	Divergent Spectrum	—	—
2012	"Vava Voom" (with Lupe Fiasco)	Vava Voom	—	26
2012	"Ugly" (with Amplive)	Vava Voom	—	—
2012	"Freestyle"	Freestyle EP	—	32
2014	"Now" (featuring Rye Rye)	Noise vs. Beauty	—	—
2014	"You & Me" (featuring W Darling)	Noise vs. Beauty	—	—
2015	"Concussive" (with Renholdër)	DJ Sona's Ultimate; Skin Music	—	—
2015	"Into The Sun"	Into the Sun	32	22
2016	"Speakerbox" (re-released to promote The Fate of the Furious)	Into the Sun	36	12
2016	"Reaching Out"	Unlimited	—	45
2017	"Watch Out" (with Dirtyphonics featuring Ragga Twins)	Non-album single	—	—
2018	"Heavyweight Sound" (with Jantsen featuring RD)	Reflective Part 3 EP	—	—
2020	"Nice & Easy" (featuring Rodney P)	All Colors	—	—
"—" denotes a recording that did not chart or was not released.

=== As featured artist ===
Year	Title	Album
2018	"Rabbit's Revenge" (Tom Morello featuring Bassnectar, Big Boi, and Killer Mike)	The Atlas Underground

== Mixtapes ==
Year	Title
1998	Gardens
1999	Dreamtempo
2000	World Beat Juice
2001	Freakbeat for the Beatfreaks
2002	Beatfreak Bohemia
2006	2006 BBC Pacific Breaks Special
2008	Smashers & Mashers
2008	Leftfield Downtempo Hyphop
2009	Live Mixset for KISS FM
2010	2010 IDJ Mixtape
2010	Bassnectar BBC Mixtape
2011	Color Storm Remixtape
2012	2012 BBC MistaJam Mixtape
2012	Amorphous Music Mixtape Volume 7
2012	European Vacation Mix
2012	Freestyle Mixtape
2013	Immersive Music Mixtape Part One & Two
2015	Mixtape 13
2016	Night Owl Radio 057 ft. Bassnectar Takeover
2019	Tempo of Dreams Mixtape
2020	The Lockdown Mixtapes Pt.1: Inside For The People
2020	The Lockdown Mixtapes Pt. 2: Sound In Motion
2023	Music for Optimists - Mixtape #29
2023	Bassnectar Radio Mixtape 1

== Remixes ==
Year	Title	Artist
2001	"Skin On the Drum"	Michael Franti & Spearhead
2009	"Teleport Massive" (featuring Zumbi)	Bassnectar
2010	"Prince"	Deftones
2011	"Lights"	Ellie Goulding
2011	"Immigraniada"	Gogol Bordello
2013	"Alkher Illa Doffor"	Cheb i sabbah
2013	"Rez"	Underworld
2014	"Feeling Good"	Nina Simone
2015	"Midnight"	Joker
2015	"Beauty of the Unhidden Heart"	The Glitch Mob
2017	"Get Deaded"	Noisia
2018	"High"	Rusko

== Videos ==
- "Bomb tha Blocks" (2007)
- "Vava Voom" feat. Lupe Fiasco (2012)
- "Ugly" feat. Amp Live (2012)
- "Midnight"Joker (Bassnectar Remix) (2015)
- "Reaching Out" (2016)
- "TKO" feat. Rye Rye & Zion I (2016)
- "Underground" with G Jones (2017)
- "Horizons" with Dorfex Bos (2017)
- "I'm Up" with Gnar Gnar feat. Born I Music (2017)
- "Infrared" feat. Macntaj (2017)
- "Arps Of Revolución" (2017)
- "Journey To The Center" (2017)
- "Slather" with Digital Ethos (2017)
- "Other Worlds" with Dorfex Bos (2017)
- "Psyopia" Naux Faux (Bassnectar Remix) (2017)
- "Disrupt The System" with Peekaboo feat. Azeem (2017)
- "Illusion" with Peekaboo feat. Born I Music (2019)
- "It's About To Get Hectic" with Jantsen feat. Born I Music (2019)
- "Dive" feat. RD (2019)
- "Irresistable Force" with Hailo (2019)
- "Open Your Mind" with Yookie! (2020)
- "Deep In The Jungle" with UFO! (2020)
