= Macntaj =

American rapper

- Born: Kwabena Boateng
- Origin: Seattle, Washington, USA
- Genres: Hip Hop
- Years active: 2016 – Present
- Label: Blocstar

Manctaj (born Kwabena Boateng), is a Ghanaian rapper based in Seattle, Washington.

== Biography ==
Manctaj grew up in the Seattle area, splitting time between his divorced parents' households. He became involved in gang culture in his teens, traveling frequently between Seattle and his friend’s home in the Garden Bloc neighborhood in Sacramento.

He gained recognition in 2016 after being featured in Bassnectar's track "Level Up" off of Unlimited, as well as "Infrared" on Bassnectar's subsequent 2017 studio album, Reflective. He and producer Levitate collaborated on a 2017 EP titled Omni, with tracks featuring Raz Simone and Gunplay.

Following Omni's release, Macntaj undertook an tour through India. Later, he and producer Michelangelo released single "Live Enough" in October 2018. His mixtape Trappy Gilmore was released in February 2019. He dropped his first full-length LP, Trappy Gilmore 2, in July 2019, after debuting album single "Ochit Wally" with The Source. During the COVID-19 pandemic, he released a new single and music video entitled "I Hope You Cough," followed closely by the drop album 2020 Succs.

Past collaborations include Jay Park, Black Tiger Sex Machine, and Kai Wachi.

== Discography ==
=== Singles ===
- "Lightwaves" (2016)
- "Deception" (2017)
- "Sister" (2017)
- "Xtra" (2018)
- "Blocc Shit" (2018)
- "Bang Out (feat. Levitate)" (2018)
- "Live Enough" (2018)
- "Carnage" (2018)
- "Ochit Wally" (2019)
- "Shakes" (2019)
- "I Hope You Cough" (2020)
- "QNC" (2020)
- "Doomsday" (2020)

=== EPs ===
- Omni (2018)
- Trappy Gilmore (2019)

=== Studio albums ===
- Trappy Gilmore 2 (2019)
- 2020 Succs! (2020)
- Big Bloc Meign (2021)
