= Masia One =

Canadian rapper

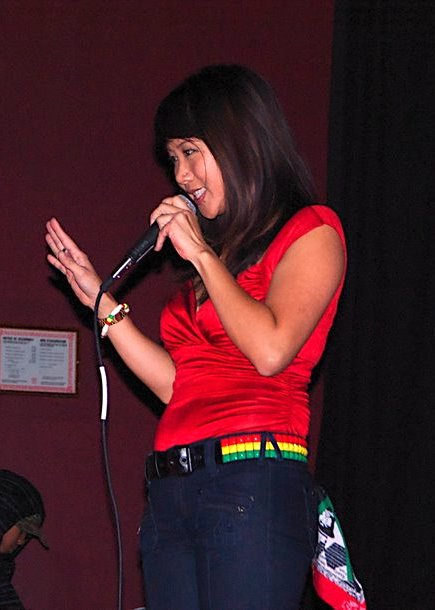

Background information
- Born: Masia Lim; Singapore
- Origin: Toronto, Ontario, Canada
- Genre: Hip hop
- Occupations: Rapper, singer
- Website: masiaone.com

Masia Lim, better known as Masia One (MAS1A) (/ˈmeɪʒə ˈwʌn/), is a Canadian rapper from Toronto, Ontario.

== Biography ==
Lim was born in Singapore and moved to Canada at a very young age, growing up in Vancouver before moving to Toronto, Ontario. She attended the University of Toronto and graduated with degrees in Architecture and Economics. In 2003, she started an independent record label known as M1 Group (later renamed The Merdeka Group) and subsequently released her debut album, Mississauga. Her most famous songs are "Split Second Time", "Return of the B-Girl" and "Warriors Tongue". In 2003, Masia One became the first female rapper to be nominated for "Best Rap Video" in the MuchMusic Video Awards.

Her second album, Pulau was released in fall 2008, in two volumes; Pulau: Chapter 1: Montreal in the Fall and Pulau: Chapter 2: The Islands. It features collaborations with Moe Masri, Isis, Lady E, DJ SARASA, Dylan Murray, Zaki Ibrahim, Junia T, Moka Only, Sikh Knowledge, Vybz Machine and more.

In 2012, she appeared on former Red Hot Chili Peppers guitarist John Frusciante's EP, Letur-Lefr. Masia One has also been featured on two ill.Gates songs, on his 18-track LP, The ill.Methodology, also released in 2012. Her third album Bootleg Culture 2014, was produced by Kops and Robbers, the production duo of Che Vicious (Aftermath, G.O.O.D. Music, Jay-Z, Eminem) and Travis von Cartier. The album included features from RZA and notable Canadian artists Isis Salam and Graph Nobel. Warrior's Tongue off this project was used by Bassnectar in his song "Speakerbox" off his Into the Sun album, which became the trailer theme song for The Fate of the Furious. Masia One spent years in Jamaica following the release of her third album and worked on a yet unreleased record at Bob Marley's Tuff Gong studios with Jamaican reggae band Dubtonic Kru.

In 2015, Masia One moved back to the place of her birth Singapore and founded the Singapura Dub Club, the country's first Dub, Reggae and Dancehall events company. She spent the next year's touring Southeast Asia and connecting Reggae scenes from across this region to bring Jamaican inspired music to the forefront. Through Singapura Dub Club she has brought artists like Sister Nancy, Johnny Osbourne, General Levy, U-Brown, Papa Ugee, Cojie (Mighty Crown) and Tippa Irie to the Lion City.

In the fall of 2018, Masia One released her 4th studio album, Far East Empress, which was produced by Richie Beretta and featured artists collaborations with Southeast Asian talents and executive. Her first single "Wastin" has been released with a video that features dance crew Ragga Waka and other influential Singaporean women.

== Discography ==
- Mississauga (2003)
- Pulau (2009)
- Highplace Drive (2010)
- Bootleg Culture (2014)
- Far East Empress (2018)
