= Mighty High Coup =

Musical group from Atlanta, Georgia

- Origin: Atlanta, Georgia, United States
- Genres: Hip hop; Southern hip hop
- Years active: 2007–present
- Members: Mr. SOS; Amir "A Bomb" Herron; Ricky Raw

Mighty High Coup is a Hip Hop Group from Atlanta, GA made up of members SOS (formerly of The CunninLynguists), Ricky Raw, and Amir "A Bomb" Herron. The group is known throughout Atlanta's Hip Hop scene for their performances and for their members involvement in the Atlanta music scene. They launched both //404 Day// and //808 Fest//, mostly coordinated by member Ricky Raw in an effort to unite and showcase all local artists who create or perform bass heavy Hip Hop or EDM.

== Music ==
After the group released their first album,To the Moon they teamed up with Bassnectar and collaborated on a song called The 808 Track for his album Wildstyle. The song was used in the hit AMC drama Breaking Bad. Their next album Boom Rap was released in 2012, and they produced a video for the song Boom which premiered at the release party. On that momentum, they released their third studio album Dark Side of the Boom, followed by a collaboration with Dubstep producer Caspa called On it.

== Acclaim ==
In 2014 Creative Loafing Atlanta named Mighty High Coup Best Local Hip Hop Act
