= Heads Up (Bassnectar EP) =

EP by Bassnectar
- Released: November 4, 2008
- Recorded: 2008
- Genre: Bass, electronica
- Length: 23:20
- Label: Amorphous Music
- Producer: Lorin Ashton

Bassnectar chronology
Underground Communication (2007)	Heads Up (2008)	Art of Revolution (2009)

Heads Up is an EP by American electronic music artist Bassnectar, released November 4, 2008 on Amorphous Music. The title track, "Heads Up", was originally a song to be seen on an upcoming full length titled The Other Side but never came to fruition, as Cozza Frenzy was released shortly after. "Lucy In The Sky With Diamonds Remix" was an exclusive CD only track.

== Track listing ==
Heads Up
No.	Title	Length
1.	"Heads Up (Cris Stanton Remix)"	5:02
2.	"Beats Antique Roustabout (Bassnectar Remix)"	3:08
3.	"Heads Up (California Style)"	4:44
4.	"Heads Up (West Coast Lo-Fi Remix)"	3:46
5.	"Heads Up (Malente Remix)"	5:14
