= Di Blueprint Band =

Jamaican band

Di Blueprint band is a Jamaican R&B, Reggae, and Pop band.

== History ==
Di Blueprint was formed by students at the Edna Manley College of the Visual & Performing Arts in Saint Andrew Parish, Jamaica. They entered and won a Battle of the Bands competition in Jamaica, and subsequently performed in the 2012 Lions in the Garden concert, organized by Rootz Releaf and La Reserva Foundation.

On December 9, 2012 the band won the Global Battle of the Bands World Finals and gained the title of "Best New Band in the World", replacing another Jamaican band, Dubtonic Kru, the previous year's winner.

Di Blueprint dedicated their win of the GBOB world finals to Rameish Folks, a former member of the band who died before being able to go London.

Di Blueprint has been featured in the April 2012 issue of Buzzz Magazine and performed on Itey & Fancy Cat show and were the winners of the Jamaica Global Battle of the Bands competition.

Three of the members of the band left after the competition. The band regrouped and performed at various venues in Jamaica, including the Jamaica Jazz and Blues Festival and the Arts in the Park festival in 2013.

The Di Blueprint has performed at the Gungo Walk World Music Festival and has experimented with the use of the computer audio processing plug-in Autotune by Antares with their vocals on select songs as they fuse dance, reggae and dancehall music forms. In 2014, the band toured internationally with singer Konshens.

Di Blueprint has also performed at Usain Bolt's "Tracks & Records" at their "Behind the Screen" performance series.

== Members ==
The members of the band in 2013 were guitarist and lead singer Elton Brown, bass player Alex Gallimore, Keyboardist and musical director Vern Hill, Band leader and drummer Kedron Kennedy.
