= The Meadows Music & Arts Festival =

- Genre: Hip hop, Rap, Electronica, Indie rock, Alternative rock
- Dates: September 15–17, 2017
- Locations: Citi Field, Queens, New York City, United States
- Years active: 2016 - 2017
- Founders: Founders Entertainment
- Website: Official Website

The Meadows Music & Arts Festival was an annual music festival held at Citi Field in Queens, New York City. The festival was produced by Founders Entertainment, which also produces the Governors Ball Music Festival. The inaugural festival, held on October 1–2, 2016, was headlined by several artists, including: Kanye West, J. Cole, Kygo, and Chance the Rapper. The festival boasted 42 artists and four stages: Linden Blvd., Queens Blvd., Shea, and The Meadows. The festival was inspired by the cancellation of Kanye West's set during the Sunday of the 2016 Governors Ball Music Festival due to heavy rains. It was announced on March 20, 2017 that the festival would return September 15–17, 2017. On May 8, 2017, the official lineup was announced, featuring headliners Jay-Z, Red Hot Chili Peppers, and Gorillaz.

== Musical acts ==
=== 2016 ===
On Tuesday, June 21, 2016, Founders Entertainment announced the inaugural edition of the Meadows Music and Arts Festival alongside the full lineup. On July 27, 2016, Founders added Pretty Lights, Thomas Jack, and Mr. Twin Sister to the lineup. After much confusion as to a conflict The Weeknd had with Saturday Night Live, it was announced on September 22, 2016 that The Weeknd would move his headlining set to 6:15 PM EST and for J. Cole to take over their headlining duties and close out the first day. However, on September 30, The Weeknd confirmed via Twitter that due to various reasons, he could not play the Meadows Festival at all.

Saturday, October 1

Meadows Stage	Shea Stage	Queens Blvd Stage	Linden Blvd Stage
J. Cole; Grimes; ~~The Weeknd~~; Chromeo; Post Malone; Lolawolf	Savages; Damian Marley; Kamasi Washington; Miami Horror; Nico Naryan	Pretty Lights; Empire of the Sun; Sylvan Esso; Frightened Rabbit; World's Fair	Zhu; Thomas Jack; Yeasayer; Bas; Mr. Twin Sister

Saturday, October 1

Meadows Stage	Shea Stage	Queens Blvd Stage	Linden Blvd Stage
Kanye West; Chance the Rapper; Bryson Tiller; The Temper Trap; Zella Day	The 1975; Mac Miller; Pusha T; Charles Bradley; Mail the Horse	Kygo; Cage the Elephant; Metric; Robert DeLong; Coast Modern	Twin Shadow performing the album Purple Rain by Prince; BØRNS; Jack Garratt; Chairlift; Lewis Del Mar

=== 2017 ===
On May 8, 2017, the official lineup announcement was made for the 2017 festival, which was held September 15–17. The festival was headlined by Jay-Z, Red Hot Chili Peppers, and Gorillaz. Future, Nas, Bassnectar, and Weezer are also among the many artists who performed at the three day festival. Below is the lineup listed in the order as they appeared on the official lineup poster, as of May 13, 2017:

- Jay-Z
- Red Hot Chili Peppers
- Gorillaz
- Future
- Nas
- Bassnectar
- Weezer
- Run the Jewels
- LL Cool J feat. DJ Z-Trip
- M.I.A.
- Erykah Badu
- Foster the People
- Migos
- Action Bronson
- Big Gigantic
- TV on the Radio
- Two Door Cinema Club
- Milky Chance
- Blood Orange
- Broken Social Scene
- De La Soul
- Joey Bada$$
- Tegan and Sara
- Tory Lanez
- 21 Savage
- St. Paul & The Broken Bones
- Ghostface Killah
- Flatbush Zombies
- Sleigh Bells
- Big Boi
- Marian Hill
- Sky Ferreira
- A-Trak
- BADBADNOTGOOD
- Lido
- Broods
- Antibalas
- GTA
- Lizzo
- Swet Shop Boys
- Big Wild
- Wild Belle
- Kamaiyah
- Léon
- Jacob Banks
- Fantastic Negrito
- Public Access T.V.
- CRX
- Circa Waves
- Jordan Bratton
- Youngr
- Dams of the West
- DREAMERS
- Dave
- Flor
- Arkells
- Formation
- Mike Floss
- Slaptop
