= Wildstyle (disambiguation) =

Wild Style is a 1982 American hip hop culture movie.

Wildstyle or Wild Style may also refer to:

- Wildstyle (album), a 2010 EP by American electronic music artist Bassnectar
- Wildstyle, a style of graffiti
- Wildstyle Pirate Radio, a fictional radio station in Grand Theft Auto: Vice City recorded by Trouble Funk
- "Wildstyle", a 1983 hip-hop single by Afrika Bambaataa
- Wildstyle, rapper/member of Chicago hip-hop group Crucial Conflict

== See also ==
- Wildstylez (born 1983), Dutch DJ
- Wyldstyle, a character from The Lego Movie
