= Beatfreak Bohemia =

Mixtape by Bassnectar
- Released: 2002
- Recorded: 2002
- Genre: Breakbeat
- Length: 53:38
- Label: Amorphous Music
- Producer: Lorin Ashton

Bassnectar chronology
Freakbeat for the Beatfreaks (2001)	Beatfreak Bohemia (2002)	Motions of Mutation (2003)

Beatfreak Bohemia is a mix CD by American electronic music artist Bassnectar, then known as Lorin, It was released in 2002 through Amorphous Music. It is his third mixtape release, and the second to be released on CD. It was limited to only 1,000 copies.

== Track listing ==
Beatfreak Bohemia
No.	Title	Length
1.	"Bassnectar - Shel Silverstien"	1:39
2.	"Ed Rush & Optical - Slo Monster"	2:00
3.	"Majool - The Only Solution"	3:51
4.	"Mr. Oizo - Flat Beat"	3:30
5.	"Bassnectar & Sayr - Gramma Jams"	2:42
6.	"Scissorkicks - Livin' For Kicks"	3:44
7.	"Buckfunk 3000 - Jump"	3:59
8.	"2 Sinners - Who Are You?"	4:56
9.	"Dan F - Close Your Eyes"	3:50
10.	"Scissorkicks - Delamure"	3:14
11.	"Goldspot Productions - Boozey"	2:49
12.	"Chargan & Anthony Johnson - Gunshot"	2:38
13.	"Horsepower Productions - The Swindle"	2:43
14.	"Land Of The Loops - Party Pooper"	2:01
15.	"Orishas - Represent"	2:41
16.	"Bootman - To The Hip"	2:01
17.	"Bassnectar & Sayr - Grampa Slams"	5:30
