= Global Battle of the Bands =

Live music competition

The Global Battle of the Bands (GBOB) is a live music competition joined by bands from all continents around the world. It is open to amateur/professional bands of all music genres and ages; there are only two main prerequisites to joining: no cover songs and no pre-recorded tracks. All bands must play original compositions and play it live. Every year Local Qualifying Heats and National Finals take place in participating countries around the world. The winners of these go forward to the World Finals. The grand winner of the World Finals will be awarded a US$100,000.00 worth of cash and band development packages in London, as well as a golden statuette engraved with the words "Best New Band in the World".

Starting in 2004 with 16 countries participating, 25 countries took part in 2006 and participation continues to grow in 2007 to 2010 with a frequent average of over 30 countries involved.

In 2016 the GBOB World Finals were held in Berlin, in club SO36. The winners were Sinoptik from Ukraine, while Hteththtemeth (Romania) got the second place and were "The Most Voted Band of the Finalists". BoW from Poland was on the third place. The Run (Australia) were voted the crowd favourite.

== The Competition ==
The World Finals were held at the London Astoria from 2004 to 2006. In 2007, the World Finals were held in Camden, London over a three-day period at two different venues. The first two days were held at the Camden Underground, followed by the Finals at the Camden Electric Ballroom on December 6, 2007. The first two days served as a semi-finals. The World Finals 2008 were held at Astoria in London, while the finals in 2009 were held at The Scala, also in London, after Astoria closed down. 2010 was the first time the World Finals were held outside UK - in Kuala Lumpur, Malaysia. The 2010 World Finals was co-presented and televised nationwide by Astro hitz, a Malaysian Music TV Channel.

== Previous winners ==
Year	Band	Origin	Ref
2004	Second	Spain	N/A
2005	Kopek	Ireland	N/A
2006	Heavy Mojo	USA	N/A
2007	Boys in a Band	Faroe Islands	N/A
2008	Floors and Walls	England	N/A
2009	Rustic	China	
2010	Dubtonic Kru	Jamaica	
2011	-	-	-
2012	Di Blueprint	Jamaica	N/A
2013	Firekind	England	N/A
2014	-	-	-
2015	Triana Park	Latvia	N/A
2016	Sinoptik	Ukraine	N/A

== Previous Judges ==
- Gary Helsinger (Universal Music Publishing)
- Joshua Freni (Virgin Records)
- Steve Lillywhite (Producer - U2, Iggy Pop, The Rolling Stones)
- Ben Adams (A1)
- Glen Matlock (Sex Pistols)

== Countries ==
Since its start in 2004, bands from the following countries have participated in The Global Battle of the Bands:

- Australia
- Belarus
- Belgium
- Brazil
- Canada
- China
- Colombia
- Croatia
- Cyprus
- Czech Republic
- Denmark
- England
- Faroe Islands
- Finland
- Germany
- Greece
- Guatemala
- Hong Kong
- Iceland
- Indonesia
- Ireland
- Isle of Man
- Israel
- Italy
- Jamaica
- Japan
- Jordan
- Lebanon
- Malaysia
- Malta
- Mexico
- Moldova
- Morocco
- Nepal
- Netherlands
- Norway
- Pakistan
- Philippines
- Romania
- Russia
- Scotland
- Serbia
- South Africa
- Spain
- Sweden
- Thailand
- Ukraine
- United States
- Wales
