= Second (band) =

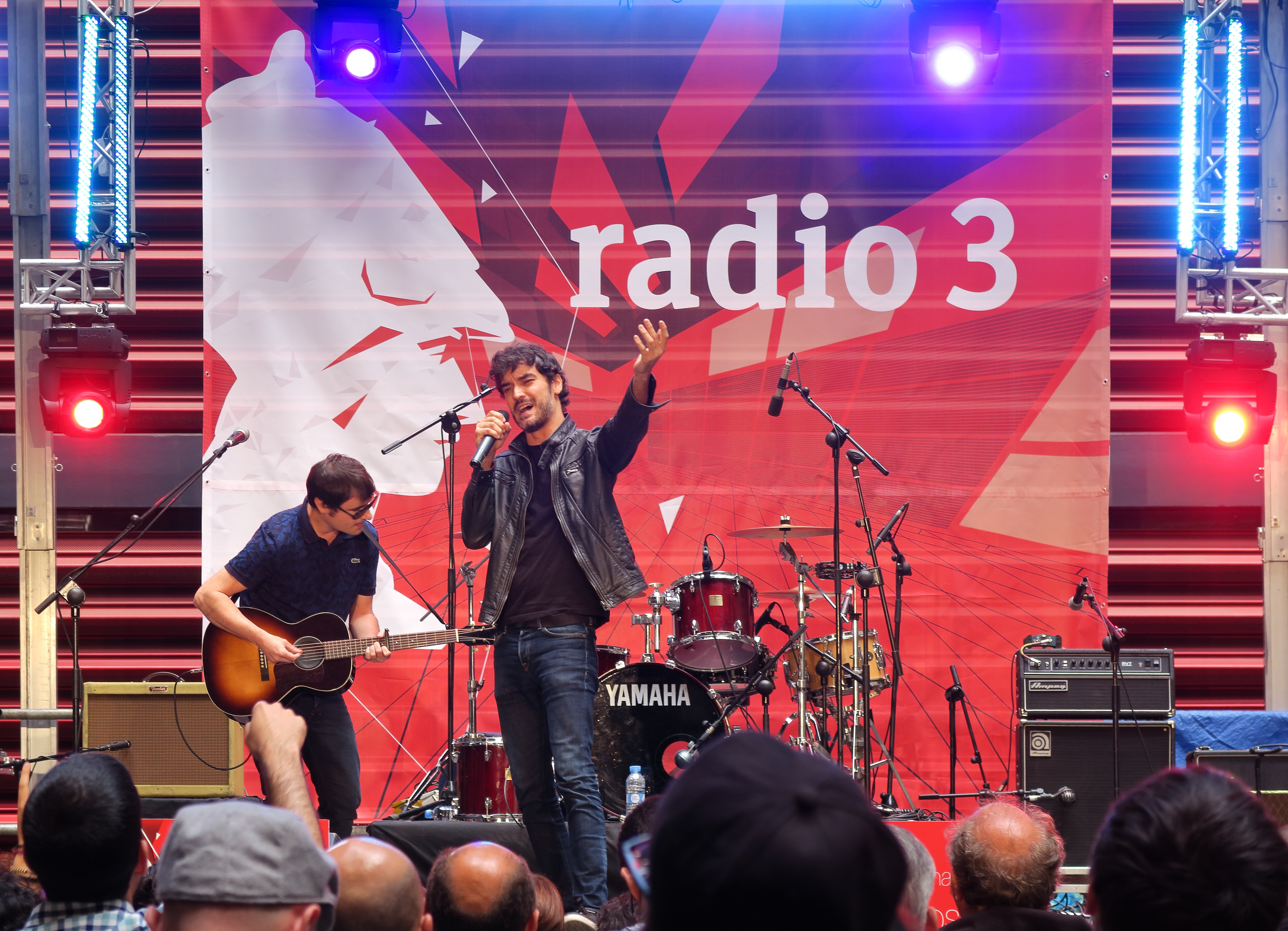
Second, 2017.

Second is a Spanish rock group from Murcia.

The group was founded in 1997 by singer Sean Frutos and guitarist Jorge Guirao, with Nando Robles filling the bass spot. After their debut album Private Life (2000), the band added another guitarist Javi Vox together with drummer Fran Guirao. Between Second's second and third album Pose (2003) and Invisible (2006), the attention to the band increased as Second won the Global Battle of the Bands contest in London in 2004.

The band was signed to Warner Music. Between 2011 and 2018, Second had five albums in the top 15 of the Spanish Albums Chart. Demasiado soñadores (2011) reached 12th, 15 (2012) reached 15th, Montaña rusa (2013) reached 11th—the two latter remained on the charts for five weeks each. Viaje iniciático (2015) gave Second its highest-charting album with a 5th place, whereas Anillos y raíces (2018) reached 14th.
