= Divergent Spectrum =

Studio album by Bassnectar
- Released: August 2, 2011
- Genres: Drumstep, dubstep, electronica, glitch
- Length: 1:05:54
- Label: Amorphous Music
- Producer: Lorin Ashton

Bassnectar chronology
Wildstyle (2010)	Divergent Spectrum (2011)	Vava Voom (2012)

Divergent Spectrum is the sixth studio album by American DJ, Bassnectar. The album was released on August 2, 2011 through his label Amorphous Music. The album included remixes of and collaborations with a number of artists spanning numerous genres of music. Within the first 10 hours of its release, Divergent Spectrum reached number 6 on iTunes Top 10 for album sales.

== Track listing ==
No.	Title	Length
1.	"Upside Down"	5:19
2.	"Plugged In (Rollz Remix)"	4:35
3.	"Immigraniada (Gogol Bordello Remix)"	4:34
4.	"Boomerang(feat.z-trip)"	4:24
5.	"Lights (Ellie Goulding Remix)"	5:03
6.	"Probable Cause" (feat. ill.Gates)	3:48
7.	"Red Step" (feat. Jantsen)	4:59
8.	"The Matrix" (feat. D.U.S.T.)	4:25
9.	"Voodoo"	6:00
10.	"Heads Up (2011 version)"	4:32
11.	"Paging Stereophonic"	4:32
12.	"Above & Beyond" (feat. Seth Drake)	3:57
13.	"Parade Into Centuries (2011 version)"	3:53
14.	"After Thought"	3:33
15.	"Disintegration Part IV"	2:20
Total length:		1:05:54

== Charts ==
Chart	Peak position
US Billboard 200	42
US Top Dance Albums (Billboard)	2
US Independent Albums (Billboard)	4
