= Freakbeat for the Beatfreaks =

Mixtape by Bassnectar
- Released: 2001
- Recorded: 2001
- Genre: Electronic
- Length: 36:02
- Label: Amorphous Music
- Producer: Lorin Ashton

Bassnectar chronology
Freakbeat for the Beatfreaks (2001)	Beatfreak Bohemia (2002)

Freakbeat for the Beatfreaks is the first album by the electronic artist Bassnectar/Lorin. It was released in 2001 through Amorphous Music. The album is his second mixtape release, and the first of which to be released on CD.

== Track listing ==
Freakbeat for the Beatfreaks
No.	Title	Length
1.	"Bassnectar & Sayr - Grampa Whams"	6:07
2.	"Monkey Mafia - Blow The Whole Joint Up"	3:48
3.	"Überzone - 2 Kool 4 Skool (Rennie Pilgram Remix)"	3:37
4.	"Freq Nasty - Goose"	4:32
5.	"Azzido Da Bass - Dooms Night (Timo Maas Remix)"	2:25
6.	"Plump DJs - Electro Disco"	2:59
7.	"Usual Suspects - Shrapnel (Stakka & Skynet Remix)"	4:44
8.	"187 Lockdown - Kung Fu"	4:30
9.	"Ranjit Manni - Bheer"	3:23
10.	"All Saints - Black Coffee (Wideboys Espresso Mix)"	3:22
11.	"DJ Zinc - 183 Trek (Zed Bias Remix)"	3:44
12.	"Soul Oddity - Little Alien"	3:22
13.	"Mr. Scruff - Ug"	3:45
14.	"Hardwire - Dope Jam"	5:01
15.	"Michael Franti & Spearhead - Skin On The Drum (Bassnectar Remix)"	7:34
