= Kopek (band) =

- Origin: Dublin, Ireland
- Genres: Alternative rock Hard rock
- Years active: 2002–2014
- Labels: Religion Music; Century Media
- Members: Daniel Jordan; Brad Kinsella; Eoin Ryan
- Website: kopekofficial.com

Kopek were an Irish rock band from Dublin, Ireland composed of Daniel Jordan (guitar, vocals), Brad Kinsella (bass, vocals) and Eoin Ryan (drums).

== History ==
=== Formation and early gigs ===
Original drummer Shane Cooney and bassist Brad Kinsella grew up as next-door neighbors in Dublin, and shared a love of classic and modern rock music. The first singer who answered their ad in a local musician's magazine was Daniel Jordan from Ashbourne, and from there the band Bloom was born, although they subsequently took on the name Kopek. Early gigs around Dublin included many battle of the bands contests, which the trio won regularly. From 2002 to 2009, Kopek toured and continued to win competitions around the world. In 2005, Kopek won the Best Live Act at the Global Battle Of The Bands, garnering them $100,000 and a world tour. Their single "Cocaine Chest Pains" reached number 25 in the American active rock charts and went top ten in Canada in rock for ten weeks. In 2009, Dublin-based record company Religion Music signed the band to a multi-album deal from Dublin based indie label Plug Artists.

=== White Collar Lies ===
Kopek's debut album, White Collar Lies, was released on iTunes in June 2010, and a physical release on 18 January 2011. The album was met with high praise: "White Collar Lies by Kopek is genius through and through, and is an astonishing feat for a debut album. If Kopek's musical talents and writing abilities continue to increase and mature in the direction in which they are currently pointed then they are poised to conquer the world." The single "Love is Dead" was featured in the film Saw 3D. Kopek toured the United States for six months from January to July 2011 in support of their debut album, White Collar Lies. In 2012, they signed a European record deal for the release of White Collar Lies with "Love is Dead" as the album's lead single.

=== Mooncroozer ===
In October 2019, Jordan and Ryan announced the formation of their new band Mooncroozer. The first single "Until The Lights" was released on Facebook in November 2019, and the second single "No Sign of Life" in December.

== Discography ==
=== Studio albums ===
Year	Album details	US Heat.
2010	White Collar Lies: Released: 2010; Label: Religion Music; Format: CD	36
2014	Rise: Released: November 7, 2014; Label: BMG; Format: digital download	—
"—" denotes a release that did not chart.

=== Reissues ===
Year	Album details	US Heat.
2012	White Collar Lies [European Release]: Released: 2012; Label: Another Century; Format: CD	—
"—" denotes a release that did not chart.

=== Singles ===
Year	Song	Peak chart positions			Album
Year	Song	IRL	CAN Rock	US Main.	Album
2007	"Stop"	22	—	—	Non-album single
2010	"Cocaine Chest Pains"	—	9	25	White Collar Lies
2010	"Love Is Dead"	—	—	—	White Collar Lies
2014	"Revolution"	—	—	—	Rise
"—" denotes a release that did not chart.

== Awards ==
"Best Live Act" (2005) at Global Battle of the Bands
