= Peekaboo (musician) =

American dubstep producer (born 1995)

- Born: Matthew Austin Lucas; October 26, 1995 (age 30); Detroit, Michigan, U.S.
- Genres: Dubstep; freeform bass; space bass
- Occupations: Disc jockey; record producer; composer
- Instruments: DAW; guitar; trumpet
- Years active: 2016–present
- Labels: Wakaan; Deadbeats; Bite This; Submerged Music; Space Cult; Amorphous Music; Jadū Dala; Big Tooth Records; Major Recordings
- Website: peekaboobeats.com

Matthew Austin Lucas (born October 26, 1995), better known by his alias Peekaboo (stylized in all caps), is an American dubstep producer. Although he began as a multi-genre electronic music artist, he is mostly now known for his particular style of dubstep, also known as freeform bass and space bass. His sixth extended play Wrecking Ball debuted at #10 on Billboard's Dance/Electronic Album Sales chart in early 2019.

== Early life ==
Lucas was born into a musical family, with his dad being a professional trumpet player for the Detroit Symphony Orchestra and eventually learning to play trumpet and guitar himself. Getting inspiration from the song "Kill Everybody" by Skrillex while a freshman in high school, he originally began producing a variety of genres from progressive house. He studied at Western Michigan University (active in the Lambda Chi Alpha fraternity) to become an audio engineer for horror films, later incorporating horror elements into his music. He later abandoned his studies and moved to Los Angeles in 2017.

In April 2017, Lucas self-released his debut 3-track extended play titled Revenge alongside the single titled "Wobbly", which was well received by American DJ and record producer Bassnectar, who contacted Lucas to express his love for the song. Bassnectar later went on to play "Wobbly" in his set at Electric Forest Festival. In an interview with River Beats, he spoke about the effect Bassnectar had on the song, with the song sharply gained plays, surpassing over 10,000 plays on SoundCloud and eventually gaining over 120,000 plays. Lucas later went on to collaborate with Bassnectar to release the song "Disrupt The System" (featuring Azeem) as part of Bassnectar album Reflective, Pt. 2.

== Career ==
=== 2018: Imposters EP, Maniac EP and "Babatunde" ===
On April 9, 2018, Lucas collaborated with G-Rex for their remix of the song "Witch Doctor" by Atlanta-based duo ATLiens via Space Cult. The remix was featured on the remix album Invasion Remixes. Michael Placencia of Trillvo described the remix as a seemingly "silent banger" until "that bass and high screech hit you it hits hard!"

On April 11, 2018, Lucas self-released "U Don't Know Me", a collaboration with bass and trap music producer Wevor Trill, via the record label Jadū Dala. Dani of Nest HQ described the song as having a "nostalgic heaviness to it, reminiscent of the Hudson Mowhawke, Sinjin Hawke era of trap records from the mid-2000s and focuses on spartan percussion, chippy synth slots, and a genuinely massive 808."

On May 4, 2018, Lucas released his third extended play titled Imposters. The 4-track extended play was released as a free download by Swedish electronic musician Liquid Stranger's record label Wakaan. It was well received by most critics, with Ryan Castillo of Dancing Astronaut praising the extended play, calling it an "otherworldly masterpiece" and describing the composition as an "entirely new take on the experimental bass genre, layering warped bass lines and eerie sonics upon a deliciously left field landscape." Nest HQ's Jordan Mafi commended the extended play by calling it a "mixture of jaw-dropping bass and a frightening setting", finalising his review by calling it "a wild ride straight to Mars." Writing for Bassrush, Chris Muniz judged the extended play by its tracklist, describing it as giving "a sense of the kind of otherworldly vibrations you’re bound to conjure up in your chakras as bits like "Aliens", "Arrival", "Invasion", and the title cut "Imposters" craft a body-snatching scenario sure to have you and the squad wilding out in the forest and howling at the moon."

On June 22, 2018, Lucas released his remix of Liquid Stranger's song "Hotbox" via Wakaan, a record label owned by the latter. On release, Lucas commented on how he got the opportunity to the song, stating "I was really honoured when [Liquid Stranger] handed over the stems," further writing "He said only do this if you can 100% smash it, so obviously a lot of pressure. I went through three versions of it and finally came out with this one."

On July 13, 2018 (also known as Friday the 13th), a little over two months since the release of the Imposters extended play, Lucas released his fourth extended play titled Maniac. The 4-track extended play was released as a free download by Wakaan, marking the second extended play to be released on the label by Lucas. The four songs were premiered on various electronic music-focused websites, with "Maniac" being premiered by UKF, "Motion" by ThisSongSlaps, "Step It Up" by Dancing Astronaut, and "Work of the Devil" by Insomniac. Jordan Mafi of Nest HQ described the lead track as "channelling the sounds of a society demolished by aliens into a barren wasteland", finalising his review by summarising the extended play up as "a beautifully breakneck EP for the true bass fanatics." Noiseporn's Jeanette praised the extended play and wrote that because Peekaboo had proved that he was "one of the most exciting artists to be coming out of the bass music scene this year" because of the extended play. Ryan Romana of Magnetic Magazine listed the song "Maniac" as one of the "15 Best Bass Music Tracks of July 2018", Later adding the song to the "15 Best Bass Music Tracks of 2018", describing it as "underpinned by growling basslines and sprinkled with neatly cut chops and samples, his track "Maniac" is a slice of heaven for those who like their beats off-centre and wild."

PEEKABOO & G-Rex – "Babatunde"
A 13-second excerpt of the song "Babatunde" showcasing a focus of a more minimalist structure with a heavy low-end frequency range, which multiple online critics had categorised as the dubstep subgenre "freeform bass".

On September 7, 2018, Lucas collaborated with G-Rex once again for their song "Babatunde", released as a free download by Liquid Stranger's record label Wakaan. It was marked as the third release by Lucas to appear on the label and the first by G-Rex. The song was featured in multiple mixes by various disk Jockeys such as Zeds Dead, Jauz, Space Jesus and Liquid Stranger and was featured on various popular dubstep-oriented YouTube channels like UKF Dubstep and The Dub Rebellion, with the song gaining 40,000 plays on SoundCloud in its first weekend of being released. As of February 22, 2019, the song has gained around 485,000 plays on SoundCloud and over 160,000 views on the UKF Dubstep YouTube channel. The song was heavily praised for its minimalist yet heavy structure and became a landmark in the 'freeform bass' subgenre scene. Writing for Run the Trap, Omar Serrano noted the two collaborators distinct styles, calling it a mix of "Peekaboo's raw and distinctive style combined with G-Rex's innovative sound design." Your EDM's Matthew Meadow called it a combination of "old school wubs with modern-day trap aesthetics and wonky production", further stating that the two collaborators had released a truly "terrifying and original tune that would work well in any set." Brian Bonavolglia of ThisSongSlaps used the song as a prime example for why the two artists "have quickly become two producers on every 'must-watch' list when it comes to the realm of bass music", describing the song as an "eerie soundscape" composed of "tantalising chops and mind-numbing wobbles that will rattle your core"

On October 29, 2018, Lucas released a 40-minute mix for Halloween titled Hide and Seek on SoundCloud. The mix features released and unreleased music from himself, Bro Safari, G-Rex and Dmvu, as well as several other producers. In the description of the release, Lucas wrote: "I went around and hand-selected some underground tracks from producers who deserve the spotlight, as well as picked some IDs of mine and put them into the mix." Your EDM's Karlie Powell included the mix in a list of the best Halloween mixes of 2018.

On November 23, 2018, Lucas released his remix of "Tech Foul" by British dubstep music producer Caspa via the record label Submerged Music. He was the first artist chosen to remix a song from Caspa's LP record Vibrations since its original release in August. Writing for Nest HQ, Sadye Auren commented on the difference between Caspa's original recording and Lucas' remix, describing the remix as one that was transformed into "a dubstep pot of its own, regrowing "Tech Foul" into an equally slow, but progressively more wobbly tune."

=== 2019: Babatunde Remix EP and Wrecking Ball EP ===
On January 25, 2019, Wakaan released a 6-track remix extended play of Lucas and G-Rex's song Babatunde, more than four months after the release of the original song. The extended play included remixes from various artists, including remixes from Tynan, Dirt Monkey, Eliminate, Luzcid, Um.., as well as a VIP version of the song produced by Lucas and G-Rex. Sophia of EDM Sauce gave the extended play generally good reception, describing the remixers as one who "bring their production skills to the forefront for new takes on the track." Writing for River Beats, Caleb Beck also commented on the production, writing that you could "hear each producer directly infecting the track with their production styles" and described the VIP as "tighter, higher, and meaner, with more compression and fury all-around, and a second half that sounds denser and more organic, adding new layers of terror to the original." RaverRafting's Chad Downs commended the extended play, writing "From beginning to end, the EP is a proverbial journey through filthy sound to which listeners will certainly break their necks."

On February 12, 2019, Lucas released his remix of the song "Lights Go Down" by American electronic music producer Jauz and Canadian duo Zeds Dead. The remix was released by Deadbeats and Bite This, record labels owned by Zeds Dead and Jauz respectively. Your EDM's Matthew Meadow called the remix as "calling back to the past", comparing it to Flux Pavilion's 2012 BBC One Essential Mix and described it as "fantastic and one of our favourites takes on "Lights Go Down" yet." Brian Bonavoglia of ThisSongSlaps praised the remix, writing that Lucas has continued to impress with each release, stating "With his eclectic brand of mind-numbing bass, the menacing mastermind has injected his signature touch on "Lights Go Down" taking the explosive original and flipping it upside in a way that only Peekaboo can."

On February 28, 2019, Lucas announced that he would be releasing his sixth extended play titled Wrecking Ball and made it available for pre-saving. On March 8, 2019, the four-track extended play was released on Zeds Dead's record label Deadbeats. River Beat's Caleb Beck praised the extended play, writing that Lucas had "done it again, and more impressively, he's done it better than before", comparing Wrecking Ball to Lucas' previous extend plays, writing that the former exceeds in being "darker over heavier through ominous, swaggering rhythms and more intricate song structures." The extended play marked Lucas' first appearance (and Deadbeats' third appearance after Zeds Dead's Northern Lights #6 in November 2016 and The Shades' In Praise of Darkness at #15 in July 2018) on the Billboard charts, debuting at #10 in the Dance/Electronic Album Sales chart.

On March 29, 2019, Lucas collaborated with Bassnectar to release the song "Illusion", featuring Born I as vocals. The song, alongside 6 other songs and remixes, was released as part of Bassnectar's Reflective, Pt. 4 extended play, released on April 5. The song was released alongside a music video, directed by multi-disciplinary artist Nohista. Kat Bein of Billboard called the song a "mind-altering adventure", later complimenting the song's music video, noting it as "totally trippy." This Song Is Sick's Langston Thomas described the song as one that brings "every bit of heavy bass and wildly trippy sound design that we’ve come to expect from the superstar producer."

=== 2023: Eyes Wide Open and "Hydrate" ===
One of Lucas' early inspirations, American producer Skrillex, would adopt a throwback dubstep sound for his highly anticipated sophomore album, Quest for Fire, released in February 2023. It features "Hydrate," a song written and produced with Lucas, alongside rappers Flowdan and Beam.

Lucas would feature Flowdan and Skrillex himself, alongside longtime collaborator G-Rex, on his single "Badders," released on August 18. The second in a series of collaborative singles on Skrillex' Owsla label, it would also serve as the first single for Lucas' debut studio album, Eyes Wide Open. After "Badders," the record featured more anticipated collaborations by LYNY, Zeds Dead, and Grabbitz. Trumpeter Bill Lucas, Matthew's father, is also featured on the album.

== Artistry ==
Lucas focuses mostly on the music genre of dubstep, with several electronic music critics and bloggers commonly describing Lucas' subgenre of focus specifically as 'space bass', and even more commonly known as 'freeform bass'. Both of these terms that were both coined to originally describe Liquid Stranger's subgenre of focus, which later extended to multiple other artists including Lucas, Bleep Bloop, LSDREAM and Mersiv. The subgenre 'freeform bass' is now commonly associated with Wakaan, Liquid Stranger's own record label, with most music published by the record label being classified as the subgenre. Harrison Morgan of EDM Sauce has expressed his support for Lucas' style of dubstep, stating that it is a more "refined approach" to dubstep compared to other subgenres that have become popular in the dubstep scene, specifically riddim.

Several online electronic music news publications and bloggers had listed Lucas as one of several artists to watch in the recent years. Writers for Noiseporn and Your EDM listed Lucas as one of 20 and of 40 (respectively) artists to watch in 2019, alongside various other artists including (but not limited to) 1788-L, Svdden Death, Blanke, Fytch and Wildlyf. He has also received support from various 'heavy weight' electronic music producers including Rezz, Bassnectar, RL Grime, Caspa and Liquid Stranger.

== Discography ==
=== Albums and EPs ===
Title	Details
Revenge EP	Released: April 8, 2017; Label: Self-released; Format: Digital download
Filthy Animal Remix EP	Released: April 6, 2018; Label: Self-released; Format: Digital download
Imposters EP	Released: May 4, 2018; Label: Wakaan; Format: Digital download
Maniac EP	Released: July 8, 2018; Label: Wakaan; Format: Digital download
Babatunde Remix EP	Released: January 24, 2019; Label: Wakaan; Format: Digital download
Wrecking Ball EP	Released: March 8, 2019; Label: Deadbeats; Format: Digital download
Eyes Wide Open	Released: November 3, 2023; Label: Create Music Group; Format: Digital download, LP
Are We Dreaming?	Released: January 23, 2026; Label: Major Recordings / Warner Records; Format: Digital download

==== As a featured artist ====
Title	Details
Reflective, Pt. 2 by Bassnectar	Released: November 17, 2017; Label: Amorphous Music; Format: Digital download
Invasion Remixes by ATLiens	Released: April 19, 2018; Label: Space Cult; Format: Digital download
Rebirth by Various Artists	Released: May 29, 2018; Label: Big Tooth Records; Format: Digital download
Vibrations (Remixes) by Caspa	Released: January 8, 2019; Label: Submerged Music; Format: Digital download
Reflective, Pt. 4 by Bassnectar	Released: April 5, 2019; Label: Amorphous Music; Format: Digital download
Here's the Drop! by Deadmau5	Released: October 4, 2019; Label: Mau5trap; Format: Digital download
Shockwave by Marshmello	Released: June 11, 2021; Label: Joytime Collective; Format: Digital download
Hydrate by Skrillex	Released: February 17, 2023; Label: OWSLA / Atlantic Records; Format: Digital download

=== Singles ===
Title	Year	Album	Label
Aftermath	2016	Non-album single	Self-released
Regret	2017	Non-album single	Self-released
Sinister	2017	Non-album single	Self-released
Filthy Animal	2017	Non-album single	Self-released
Disrupt the System (with Bassnectar, featuring Azeem)	2017	Reflective, Pt. 2	Amorphous Music
B.T.F.U.	2018	Rebirth	Big Tooth Records
U Don't Know Me (with Wev)	2018	Non-album single	Jadū Dala
Babatunde (with G-Rex)	2018	Non-album single	Wakaan
Illusion (with Bassnectar, featuring Born I)	2019	Reflective, Pt. 4	Amorphous Music
Colossal (with Dirt Monkey)	2019	Non-album single	Wakaan
Hands Up! (with Calcium)	2019	Non-album single	Wakaan

=== Remixes ===
Title	Year	Artist	Label
Witch Doctor (with G-Rex)	2018	ATLiens	Space Cult
Hotbox	2018	Liquid Stranger	Wakaan
Tech Foul	2018	Caspa	Submerged Music
Lights Go Down	2019	Zeds Dead & Jauz	Deadbeats & Bite This
Strobe (ov)	2019	Deadmau5	Mau5trap
