= Mythologie =

2016 album

Studio album by Delerium
- Released: 23 September 2016
- Genre: Electronic, pop, ambient
- Length: 64:00
- Label: Metropolis Records

Delerium chronology
| Rarities & B-sides (2015) | Mythologie (2016) |

Singles from Mythologie
- 1. "Ritual" Released: 2 September 2016; 2. "Stay" Released: 17 August 2018

Professional ratings
Review scores
| Source | Rating |
|---|---|
| Release Magazine | 8/10 |
| Side-Line | 8/10 |
| The Spill Magazine | 4/5 stars |

Mythologie is the fourteenth studio album by Canadian new age/electronic music group Delerium, released in 2016. It is their first album for Metropolis Records. The album was produced by Bill Leeb and Rhys Fulber with the help of Jared Slingerland and Craig Johnsen.

The cover was designed by UK artist Dave McKean, who has worked with Leeb on Front Line Assembly covers in the past.

== Track listing ==
| No. | Title | Length |
|---|---|---|
| 1. | "Blue Fires" (featuring Mimi Page) | 6:24 |
| 2. | "Zero" (featuring Phildel) | 4:50 |
| 3. | "Keep on Dreaming" (featuring Jaël) | 5:22 |
| 4. | "Stay" (featuring JES) | 4:08 |
| 5. | "Angels" (featuring Mimi Page) | 5:56 |
| 6. | "Ritual" (featuring Phildel) | 5:13 |
| 7. | "Seven Gates of Thebes" | 4:44 |
| 8. | "Ghost Requiem" (featuring Geri Soriano-Lightwood) | 5:44 |
| 9. | "Once in a Lifetime" (featuring JES) | 4:28 |
| 10. | "Made to Move" (featuring Mimi Page) | 6:11 |
| 11. | "Continuum" (featuring Leah Randi) | 6:44 |
| 12. | "Dark Visions" (featuring Mimi Page) | 4:20 |
