= G Jones =

American DJ and record producer (born 1991)

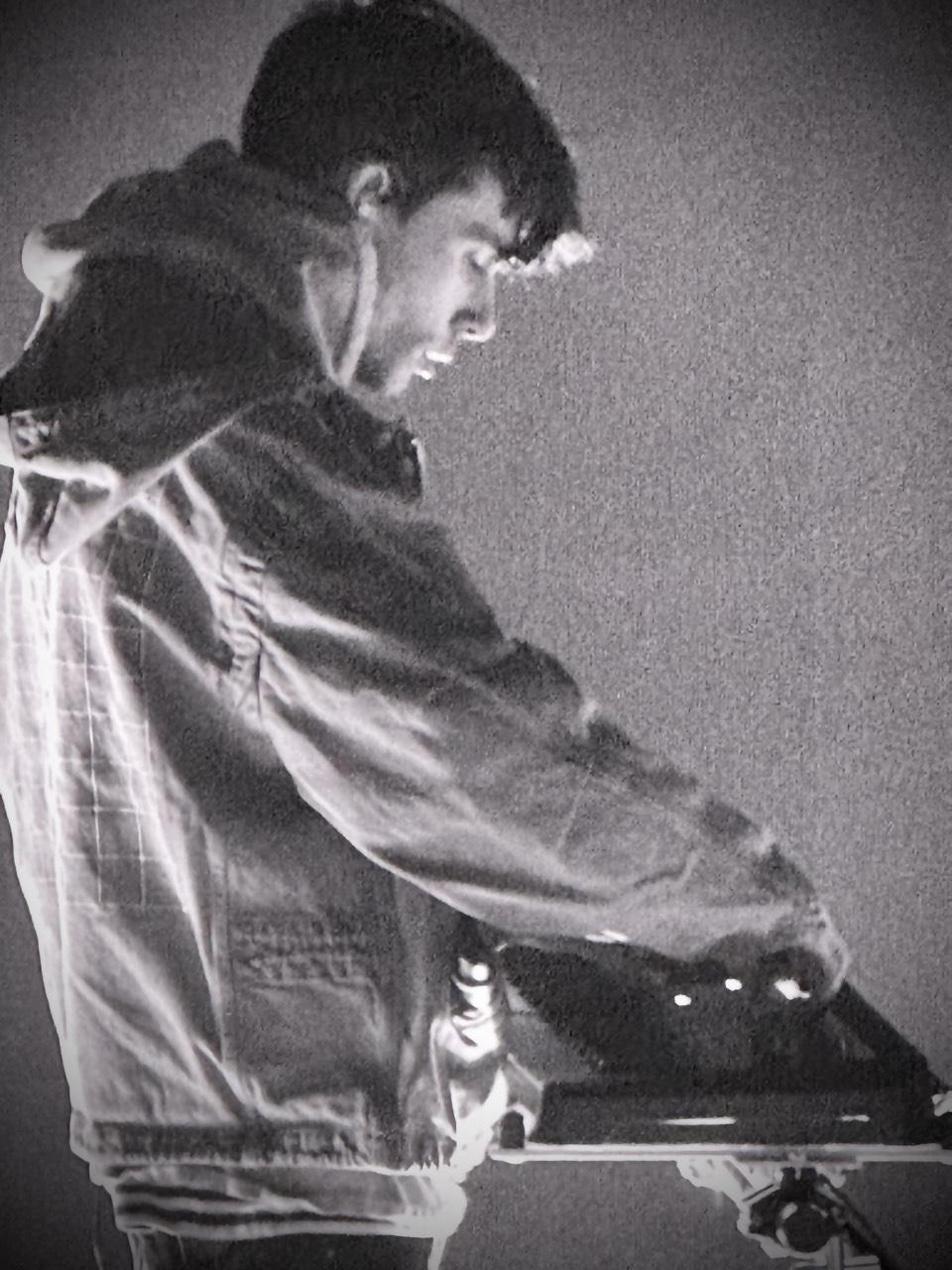
- Jones in 2023

Background information
- Born: Greg Jones; December 16, 1991 (age 34); Santa Cruz, California, U.S.
- Genres: Bass; dubstep; glitch; trip hop; experimental music; trap; breakbeat; IDM; ambient
- Years active: 2012–present
- Label: Illusory Records
- Spinoffs: Nite School Klik
- Website: gjonesbass.com

Gregory Jones (born 16 December 1991), known professionally as G Jones (and formerly known as Grizzly J), is an American electronic music producer and DJ. Born in Santa Cruz, California, Jones gained prominence in the electronic music scene for his intricate and technical production and sound design, fusing elements of bass, dubstep, glitch, trap, breakbeat, IDM, ambient and experimental genres.

== Career ==
In early life, Jones took interest in alternative rock, listening through his bedroom wall to songs by Nirvana and The Smashing Pumpkins on his brother's radio next door. Originally Jones aspired to be a songwriter and play in a band, but struggled to find others who shared his work ethic to practice regularly. In his early teens, Jones began recording tracks of himself playing guitar and drums, then using GarageBand to layer each piece together. After downloading Napster and typing in "techno" to the search bar, Jones discovered songs from artists such as Daft Punk and The Chemical Brothers, leading to a transition from producing music with traditional instruments to incorporating more electronic elements. Over time, he developed a taste for more experimental music, drawing inspiration from pioneers like Aphex Twin, Squarepusher, and Venetian Snares. The music of Mr. Oizo sparked Jones' interest in hip-hop beats, prompting him to experiment with various styles and genres, including house music and hip-hop, before gravitating towards the dubstep sound around 2008. Around age 15 or 16, Jones began using Ableton Live 6 to produce after being introduced to the software by a high school teacher, often watching tutorials on YouTube to learn production techniques. After several years of experimentation and practice, Jones published his first tracks under the name 'Grizzly-J', releasing the EP Let's Party in 2011.

In 2012, Jones changed his name from Grizzly-J to G Jones. Later that year, G Jones released the Mirage EP on Saturate!Records, a record label based in Germany. In 2013, Jones released two EPs, Transmissions in January, and Eyes in August. The following year, G Jones released Ring the Alarm, working again with the Saturate!Records label. The nine-track EP included collaborations with fellow bass music artists Minnesota, Doshy, and Mad Zach. In early 2015, DJ Shadow discovered some of Jones' music while crate-digging. The duo ended up working together and ultimately came up with the moniker "Nite School Klik". In April 2015, the pair released the single, "Posse", under Shadow's label, Liquid Amber. Initially keeping their individual identities kept a secret, Jones posited that the anonymity would allow for people to view the material "not just through the lens of 'what’s Shadow doing now?' and more like 'what’s this new weird stuff?'". Upon release, UKF called the track "dark, daring and ultimately trippy" and complimented the duo's vision and Shadow's approach to the new label. Shadow reflected on the effort, calling Jones' sound design capabilities in Ableton "astonishing". Later that same year, the duo followed up with a second single, titled "Nice Nightmares", as well as a 45-minute mixtape.

In August 2015, That Odd EP In the Pit of My Hard Drive was self-released. Around the same time, Jones' body of work drew the attention of Bassnectar, a fellow electronic music producer from the Bay Area. The two collaborated on "The Mystery Spot", a song which was released on his 2015 album Into the Sun. In November, Jones collaborated with Bleep Bloop to release the Mind EP.

In 2016, G Jones collaborated for the first of many times with Eprom, releasing the track "Warrior" on his EP Samurai. Later that year, his second Bassnectar collaboration "Mind Tricks", was released on the album Unlimited.

In January 2017, G Jones released the highly anticipated Visions, an eight-track EP. The EP featured several songs that received attention, notably "Helix", "Fuck What You Heard", its title track "Visions", as well as a VIP remix of his 2015 release "Lavender Town". 2017 also provided further opportunity for Jones to collaborate with Eprom, remixing the title track from the Pineapple EP and co-releasing the five-track EP Acid Disk. The sound produced by Jones and Eprom on this EP drew heavy inspiration from the Roland TB-303 synthesizer, the sounds of which became popularized in the late 1980s and early 1990s by the acid techno and acid house genres. The same year, Jones also collaborated again with Bassnectar on the tracks "Underground" and "Chromatek", which were included in the Reflective and Reflective - Part 2 EPs, respectively.

The commercial breakthrough of G Jones came in 2018 with the release of his album The Ineffable Truth. While familiar elements of Jones's production were present throughout the album, more conceptual and technical works were also put forth, with Earmilk noting "an impressive evolution on G Jones' sound." The album received critical acclaim, with Billboard ranking the release at 5th place on its "Top 10 Best Dance/Electronic Albums of 2018" list, describing the work as "fun and fantastical, massive and grimy". The album also received support from fellow artist RL Grime, featuring the track "Forgotten Dreams" on "Halloween VII", the 2018 offering of his annual Halloween-themed mixtape.

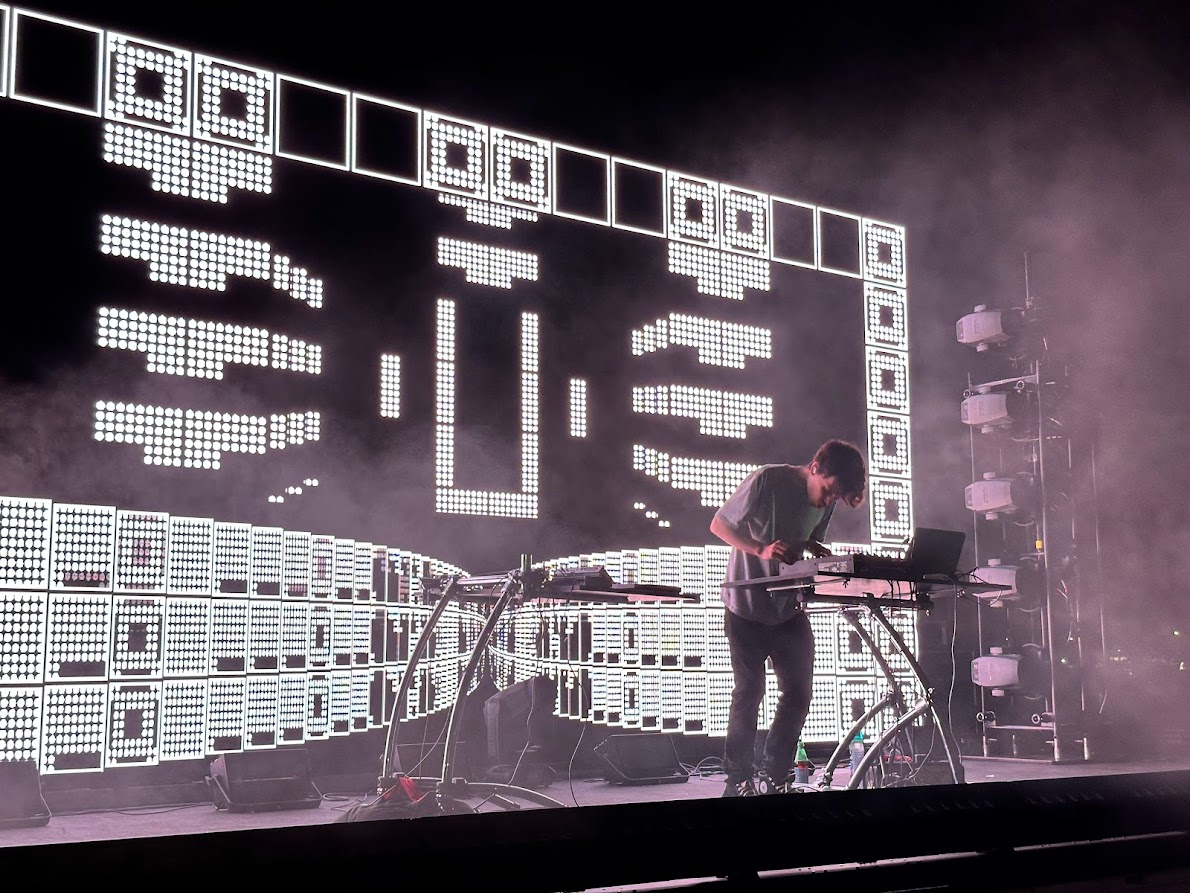
G Jones playing Red Rocks Amphitheatre during his 2023 Paths tour.

2019 saw the release of Jones' next EP, Tangential Zones, a compilation of songs described as the "epilogue" to The Ineffable Truth, and originally demoed live through the course of the album tour.

In 2022, G Jones released several bodies of work, including an EP, Illusory Tracks, and two additional Eprom collaborations, the EP Acid Disk 2, and the mixtape G Jones & Eprom Present: Disk Doctors.

In 2023, G Jones released his sophomore album, Paths. While still experimenting with elements of glitch-y and acid genres as demonstrated on past works, Resident Advisor noted a more subdued approach in these explorations, instead constructing pieces that offered more approachability in their sound.

In 2025, G Jones collaborated with Skrillex on the song "Druids", which was featured on the LP "F*CK U SKRILLEX YOU THINK UR ANDY WARHOL BUT UR NOT!! <3" Later that year, G Jones and Eprom released Disk Utility, a collaborative EP issued through their joint imprint. The four-track project was preceded by the single “Slamming Keys”.

== Discography ==
=== Studio albums ===
Title	Details
Visions	Released: 27 January 2017; Label: Illusory Records
The Ineffable Truth	Released: 26 October 2018; Label: Illusory Records
Paths	Released: 12 October 2023; Label: Illusory Records

=== EPs ===
Title	Details
Mirage	Released: 4 October 2012; Label: Saturate!Records
Transmissions	Released: 22 January 2013; Label: Mallabel Music
Ring The Alarm	Released: 29 July 2014; Label: Saturate!Records
That Odd EP In the Pit of My Hard Drive	Released: 19 August 2015; Label: Self-released
Mind (with Bleep Bloop)	Released: 3 November 2015; Label: Liquid Amber
Acid Disk EP (with EPROM)	Released: 28 October 2017; Label: Illusory Records
Tangential Zones	Released: 3 December 2019; Label: Illusory Records
Acid Disk 2 (with EPROM)	Released: 18 May 2022; Label: Illusory Records
Illusory Tracks	Released: 22 November 2022; Label: Illusory Records
Disk Utility (with EPROM)	Released: 21 November 2025; Label: Illusory Records
