= Ill.Gates =

Canadian DJ and record producer (born 1982)

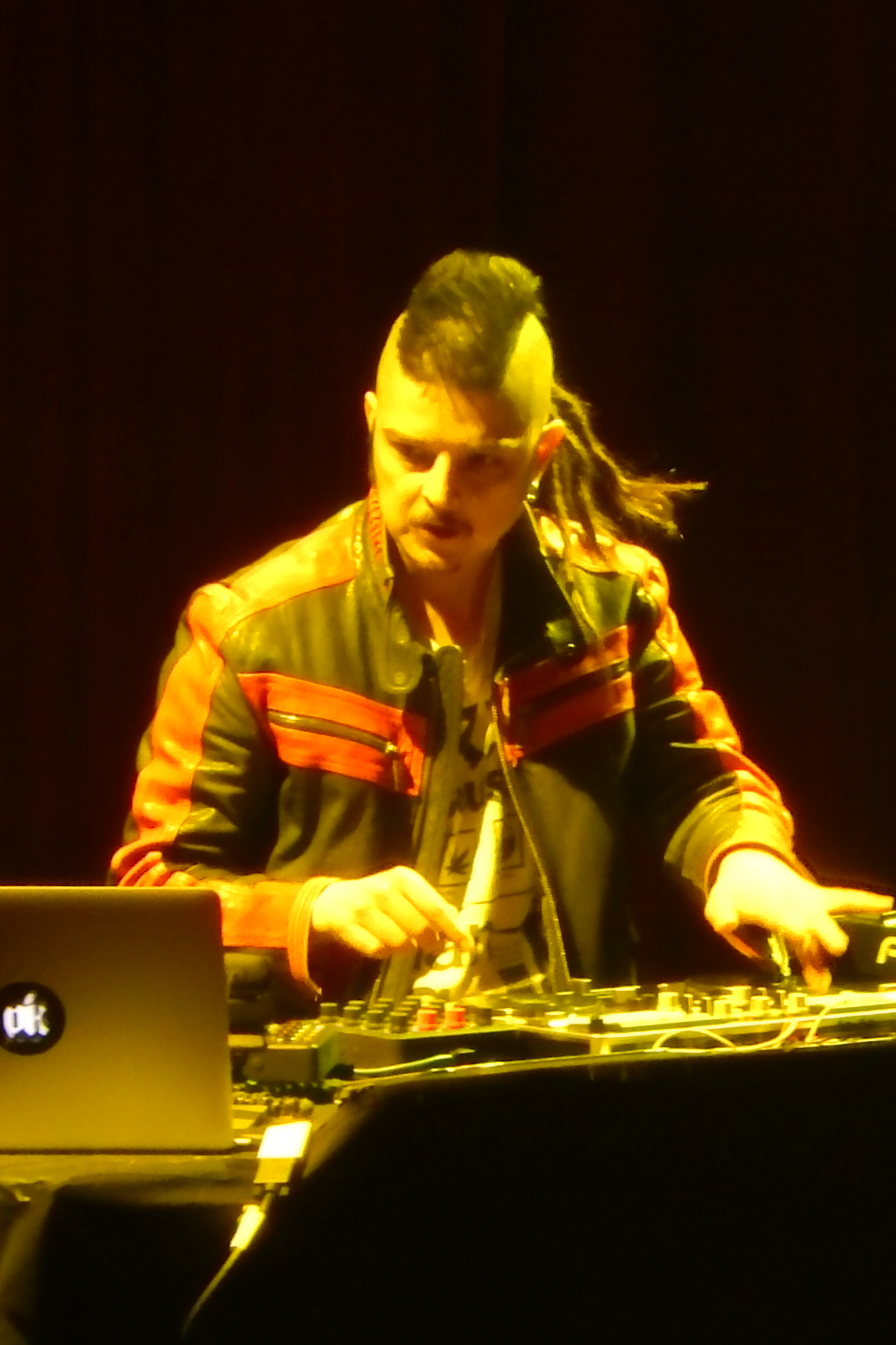

Background information
- Also known as: the Phat Conductor
- Born: Dylan Lane; October 8, 1982 (age 43); Toronto, Ontario, Canada
- Genres: Dubstep; drum and bass; drumstep; electronica; IDM; breakbeat; downtempo; nu skool breaks
- Labels: Producer Dojo; Amorphos; Alpha Pup Records; Muti Music; Impossible Records; False Profit Records
- Website: illgates.com

Dylan Lane (born October 8, 1982), professionally known as ill.Gates, is a Canadian electronic music producer, DJ, and educator known for his contributions to the dubstep and bass music genres, and has garnered acclaim for his innovative musical approach, collaborations with notable artists, and efforts to share electronic music production knowledge within the community.

== Career ==
Lane began experimenting with instruments around the age of seven. While attending Canterbury High School for visual arts, Lane took interest in the rave scene, learning to DJ in his basement and playing small local shows, including DJing for a breakdancing crew and acting as musical director for a paranormal call in radio show called The Grey Border on CHUO FM. After high school, Lane moved to Toronto, Ontario to pursue higher education, got signed to Breakbeat label 2 Wars and a Revolution records shortly thereafter, and began pressing original music to vinyl as "The Phat Conductor".

By 2005, his songs had piqued the interest of Bay Area DJ and music producer Bassnectar, who requested Lane join him on tour. While on tour, Lane attended Burning Man for the first time, gaining inspiration from the scene. Upon returning to Toronto, Lane discovered his computers had been damaged, assumed to be related to a power surge. This data loss forced the abandonment of several works in-progress and prompted Lane to start a new project from scratch. Inspired by the creative freedom he experienced at Burning Man, Lane decided to change his stage name to ill.Gates and pursue a more experimental direction. Shortly after a collaborative remix for Si Begg, ill.Gates published his first album, Autopirate, in 2008.

Originally taking interest in industrial and experimental sounds, Gates was influenced by the likes of Skinny Puppy, Nine Inch Nails, Aphex Twin, among others. He also enjoyed hip hop as well as Jamaican dub music, which helped to formulate a more eclectic approach to songwriting as he developed under his own name. As he matured, Gates continued to incorporate elements of other electronic music genres, such as dubstep, glitch-hop, drum and bass, as well as non-electronic genres like hip hop, jazz, and classical music. In describing the songwriting process, Gates had this to say:

It’s a lot like starting a fire. I get a bunch of flammable things in a pile and try to set them up in such a way that they want to ignite. Then I start striking matches and watching them die in my cold fingers. Eventually one of them lights up and I get very excited. I try to calm myself and blow on the fire gently at first. Once it’s going I start blowing harder and harder until it has a life of it’s [sic] own. Then I just have to stay awake until it’s done.

— ill.Gates

ill.Gates has collaborated with many artists over the course of his career, most notably Gucci Mane, Alanis Morissette and Bassnectar, as well as others, such as Mimi Page, Liquid Stranger, Masia One, Minnesota, G Jones, KJ Sawka (of Pendulum), and Mr. Bill.

In 2019, Disney released a collaboration between ill.Gates and composer Zain Effendi under the pseudonym Sentient 7 and the Clankers as part of Star Wars Galaxy's Edge, where it is performed daily.

=== Sound design and production techniques ===
After creating and selling some of the first commercial Ableton Live templates in 2006 (as The Phat Conductor), ill.Gates helped pioneer various production techniques, such as sampler "128s", "The Infinite Drum Rack" and "Mudpies". Seeking to expand capabilities in manipulating sounds during live performances, Gates began publishing performance templates for various MIDI controllers such as the Akai MPD32 and APC40. In 2025, ill.Gates contributed 128s style wavetables for Steve Duda's popular Serum 2 VST plugin synthesizer.

Originally offering in-person lessons and workshops, increasing demand, along with a regular tour schedule, grew to the point that in-person events became unsustainable. This led to the creation of Producer Dojo, ill.Gates's online platform offering tutorials, courses, workshops, and coaching for aspiring producers.

== Personal life ==
Gates' father, an afro-asian from Trinidad, is a professional guitarist and his mother was a teacher.

ill.Gates is married to his wife, Nunich, born in Laos. Together, they have a daughter, born in 2019.

== Discography ==
=== Studio albums ===
- Autopirate (2008)
- The ill.Methodology series (2011)
- Terminally Ill (2017)
- Departures (2018)
- The Arrival (2021)
- Bent (2022)

=== EPs ===
- Irma Vep EP (2008)
- Sweatshop EP (2008)
- Church of Bass EP (2012)
- Bounce EP (2016)
- More Tea EP (2017)
- Smoke EP (2022)
- Racks EP (2022)
- Boom EP (2023)
- The Muse EP (2023)
- Toxic EP (2023)
- Wave EP (2023)
