= Art of Revolution =

EP by Bassnectar
- Released: 2009
- Recorded: 2009
- Genre: Dubstep, electronica, Breaks
- Length: 27:07
- Label: Amorphous Music
- Producer: Lorin Ashton

Bassnectar chronology
Heads Up (2008)	Art of Revolution (2009)	Cozza Frenzy (2009)

Art of Revolution is an EP by American electronic music artist Bassnectar, released in 2009 on Amorphous Music.

== Track listing ==
No.	Title	Length
1.	"Art of Revolution"	4:09
2.	"Art of Revolution (Instrumental)"	3:10
3.	"Art of Revolution (Diplo Remix)"	6:25
4.	"Art of Revolution (Product 01 Remix)"	6:00
5.	"Art of Revolution (Ghislain Poirer Remix)"	4:22
6.	"Art of Revolution (6Blocc Remix)"	3:05
