= Youngr =

British musician (born 1989)

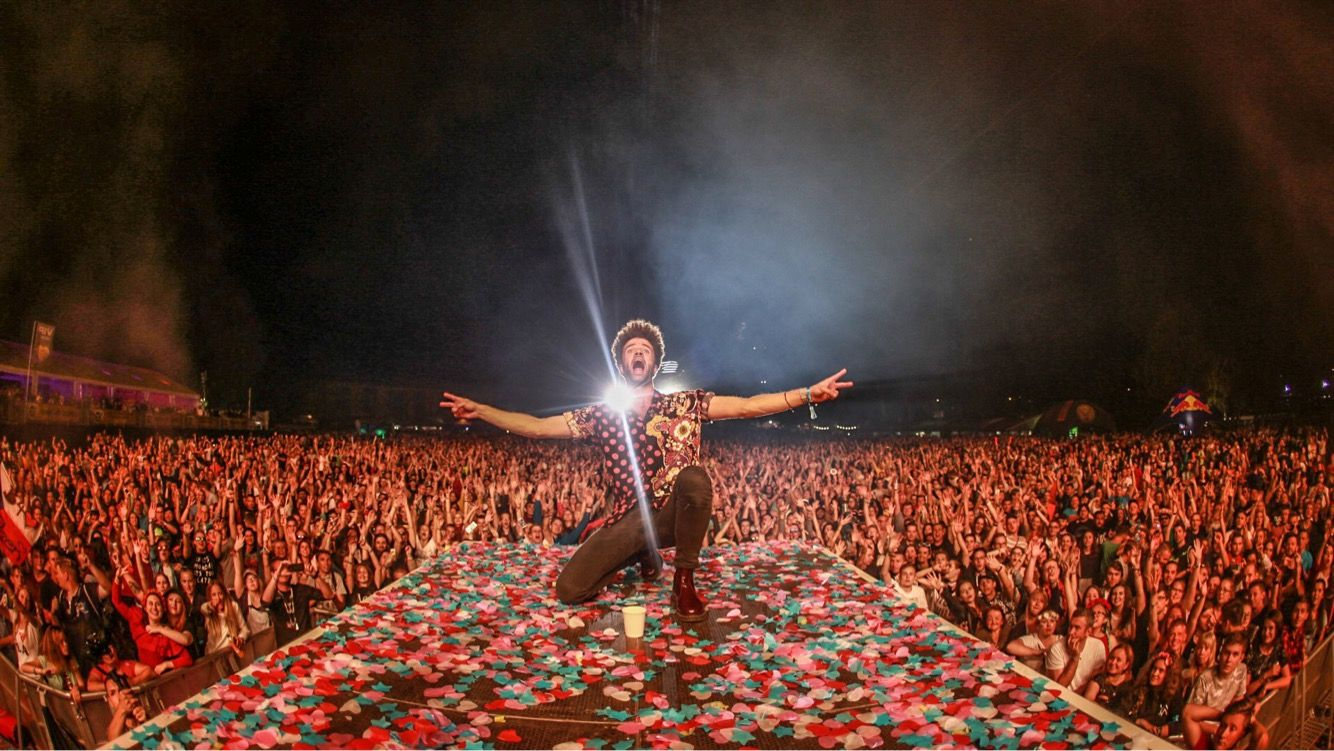

Background information
- Born: Dario Younger Brigham-Bowes; 27 February 1989 (age 36); Urmston, England
- Origin: Urmston, England
- Genres: Pop, dance-pop
- Years active: 2012 – present
- Labels: Island Records; Armada Music
- Website: www.youngrmusic.com

Youngr (Dario Younger Brigham-Bowes, also known as Dario Darnell) is a British singer, songwriter, producer and musician.

== Early life ==
The son of August Darnell (alias Kid Creole of Kid Creole and the Coconuts), he was born in Urmston, near Manchester, England, on 27 February 1989. He began his music career in 2012, forming Liverpool-based act Picture Book with his brother Lorne Ashley Brigham-Bowes. He has recorded and performed as a solo artist under the name Youngr since 2016.

== Picture Book ==
The two multi-instrumentalist brothers attended university at the Liverpool Institute for Performing Arts (LIPA), where they developed their musical skills, collaborated with other artists, and developed the electronic dance sound that characterized Picture Book's debut EP At Last, released 6 February 2012. The brothers co-wrote and co-recorded the tracks with singer-songwriter Greta Svabo Bech, whose contributions to the project gained her the notoriety that led to her collaboration with Deadmau5 on "Raise Your Weapon."

A notable early credit from these years was the brothers' co-write of the track "My Love" from Cher's 2013 album Closer to the Truth.

When Bech left the Picture Book project, Dario took over front-man duties for the band, which they renamed Stony Browder Jr. after the brothers' late uncle, who had led their father's first project, Dr. Buzzard's Original Savannah Band. Dario's brother Ash continued to lead Stony Browder Jr. after Dario embarked on his solo career as Youngr.

== Solo career ==
Dario began to gain popularity as a solo artist partly through a series of one-take performance videos he released on Facebook and his YouTube channel, covering artists such as Daft Punk, Dua Lipa, Tove Lo, Linkin Park, and Jamiroquai. Jamiroquai's lead singer, Jay Kay, specifically name-checked Youngr's live mashup of his band's songs, which included "Virtual Insanity", "Little L", "Cosmic Girl", and "Canned Heat".

In April 2016, he released the track "Out of My System." It became a viral hit, and 10 months later had been streamed 20 million times on Spotify, a total that later rose to over 37 million. Following its success he went out on a world tour, which included a 27 February 2017, show at the O2 ABC. While on tour, he collaborated on remixes with artists in South America and India.

A second viral hit came with his bootleg of The Temper Trap’s "Sweet Disposition", which was viewed over 15 million times in its first two weeks.

On the strength of these hits Dario signed a deal with Island Records, which re-released "Out of My System." His subsequent releases included the single "Monsters" on April 14, 2017, the video for which was premiered by Billboard on April 25;, the September 2017 single "What's Next," co-written and co-produced with Asia Whiteacre; and "Space for Us," a collaboration with Wingtip. In January 2018 Island released Youngr's debut album This Is Not an Album, which collected his releases from the previous year and also included the new single "Ooh Lordy".

In May of that year he applied his talents to a tourism promotion for Visit Jersey, filming a video of himself performing on various instruments, at different locations on the island, a remix he had previously recorded of the soundtrack to the BBC detective series Bergerac.

Also in 2018 he teamed with Armin van Buuren's record label Armada Music to release a bootleg. That led to his signing an exclusive deal on 19 July 2019 with Armada, which released that summer and fall his singles "Nightcrawling," "Delusional," and "Superman."

In 2020 he released his album Memories on Armada, described as "a ten-track journey through Youngr’s life experiences", followed by a mixtape, Bootleg Mix Vol. 1, a collection of Youngr bootlegs from Armada's back catalog, to which the label had given the artist full access. The mixtape led off with a reworking of Autoerotique's "Count On You."

On tour, he has performed in 45 countries, at festivals including SXSW, Latitude Festival, Ultra Music Festival, Montreux Jazz Festival and The Meadows Music & Arts Festival, and at Ministry of Sound's birthday jam in September 2019.

In 2021 he took part in Simon Cowell/Syco's new music competition for ITV called Walk the Line. Youngr appeared as the opening act on the second episode, broadcast on 13 December 2021, performing a version of his 2018 single "Ooh Lordy". However, he was eliminated from the competition at that point, with the reigning champion Ella Rothwell going through to the third episode.

== Discography ==
=== Albums and EPs ===
With Picture Book

- 2012: At Last (EP)

As Youngr

- 2018: This is Not an Album (Island Records)
- 2018: Obsession (EP) (Island Records)
- 2020: Memories (Armada Music)
- 2020: Bootleg Mix Vol. 1 (Armada Music)

=== Singles ===
- 2016: "Out of My System" (Island Records)
- 2016: "Too Keen" (Island Records)
- 2017: "'93" (Island Records)
- 2017: "Monsters" (Island Records)
- 2017: "What's Next" (Island Records)
- 2017: "Stronger" (Island Records)
- 2017: "Give It Up" (with Endor) (Island Records)
- 2018: "Lost in Translation (Remixes)" (Island Records)
- 2018: "Remember" (Island Records)
- 2018: "Ooh Lordy" (Island Records)
- 2019: "Nightcrawling" (Armada Music)
- 2019: "Superman" (Armada Music)
- 2019: "Delusional" (feat. ilselena) (Armada Music)
- 2021: "Brothers and Sisters" (Armada Music)
- 2021: "Boy from Manchester" (Armada Music)
- 2021: "Wild Kids" (with Black Tiger Sex Machine) (Kannibalen Records)
