= Vava Voom =

Studio album by Bassnectar
- Released: April 10, 2012
- Genre: Electronica, dubstep, drumstep, trip hop, glitch, glitch hop, bass music
- Length: 54:21
- Label: Amorphous Music
- Producer: Lorin Ashton

Bassnectar chronology
Divergent Spectrum (2011)	Vava Voom (2012)	Noise vs. Beauty (2014)

Vava Voom is the seventh studio album by Bassnectar released on April 10, 2012, through his label Amorphous Music. The album includes several collaborations with artists from other genres; most notably, Lupe Fiasco. The song "Pennywise Tribute" is a remix of the Pennywise song "Bro Hymn (Tribute)" from their Full Circle album.

== Track listing ==
No.	Title	Length
1.	"Vava Voom" (featuring Lupe Fiasco)	3:49
2.	"Empathy"	4:20
3.	"Ugly" (featuring Amp Live)	4:33
4.	"Ping Pong"	4:32
5.	"What" (featuring Jantsen)	4:54
6.	"Pennywise Tribute"	4:35
7.	"Do It Like This" (featuring ill.Gates)	3:06
8.	"Laughter Crescendo" (2012 version)	5:51
9.	"Butterfly" (featuring Mimi Page)	4:18
10.	"Nothing Has Been Broken" (featuring Tina Malia)	5:48
11.	"Chronological Outtakes"	8:35
Total length:		54:21

== Charts ==
Chart	Peak position
US Billboard 200	34
US Top Dance Albums (Billboard)	2
US Independent Albums (Billboard)	8
