= Black Tiger Sex Machine =

Canadian EDM band

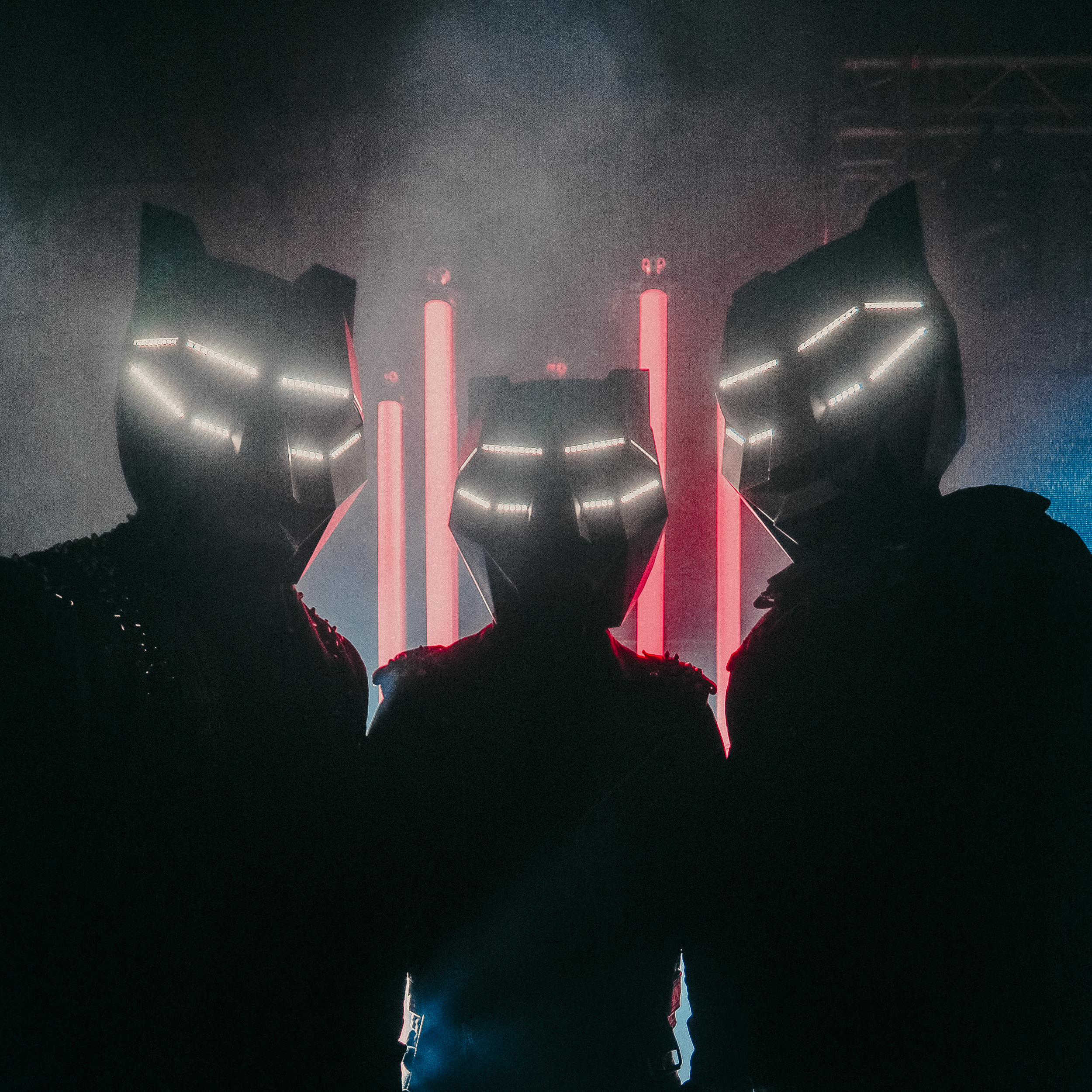

Background information
- Also known as: BTSM
- Origin: Montreal, Quebec, Canada
- Genres: Electro; bass; dubstep
- Years active: 2011–present
- Label: Kannibalen
- Members: Patrick Barry; Marc-André Chagnon; Julien Maranda
- Website: www.blacktigersexmachine.com

Black Tiger Sex Machine, often abbreviated BTSM, are a Canadian electronic music trio based in Montreal, Quebec. The trio are the label heads for Kannibalen Records, which has signed such artists as Kai Wachi, Apashe, Dabin and Lektrique. BTSM specialize in aggressive, dark electronic music, as well as a live show that extends beyond a typical DJ performance. The trio are Marc Chagnon, Julien Maranda and Patrick Barry. The group wear illuminated tiger helmets during their live shows.

== Live show ==
Black Tiger Sex Machine perform a live show as a three piece band. They utilize a central mixer, drum machines, launchpads and keyboards, with a lighting setup that is synced with their music, including the LED lighting on their tiger helmets. They have performed at Ultra Music Festival, Lollapalooza, Bonnaroo, TomorrowWorld, Electric Daisy Carnival, Electric Forest, Electric Zoo, SXSW, Escape, Evolve, Lost Lands, Paradiso, crush, Osheaga, Ile Soniq, Igloofest, Shambhala, Big Dub, and Decadence. Currently, BTSM are signed to United Talent Agency, after UTA acquired BTSM's previous agency Circle Talent Agency.

== Discography ==
=== Albums and extended plays ===
- Drama (Kannibalen Records 2011)
- The Kannibalen Anthem (Kannibalen Records 2011)
- Rhythm Mode (Kannibalen Records 2012)
- Studs, Spikes & Blood (Kannibalen Records 2012)
- Jack Dat Body (Kannibalen Records 2013)
- Destroy It (Kannibalen Records 2013)
- Afterworld (Kannibalen Records 2014)
- The Grave (Kannibalen Records 2014)
- Funeral March (Kannibalen Records 2015)
- Welcome to Our Church (Kannibalen Records 2016)
- New Worlds (Kannibalen Records 2018)
- Futuristic Thriller (Kannibalen Records 2020)
- Once Upon a Time in Cyberworld (Kannibalen Records 2022)

=== Singles ===
- "Rapid Fire" with Dead Battery (Kannibalen Records 2014)
- "On the Run" (Kannibalen Records 2014)
- "More" with Haezer (Kannibalen Records 2014)
- "Revolt" (Kannibalen Records 2014)
- "The Craving" with Kai Wachi (Kannibalen Records 2014)
- "Rockers" with Astronaut (Kannibalen Records 2015)
- "Religion" with Lektrique (Kannibalen Records 2015)
- "Numbers" (Kannibalen Records 2015)
- "Break" with Dabin (Kannibalen Records 2015)
- "Mountains" (Kannibalen Records 2016)
- "Face Down" (Kannibalen Records 2016)
- "Hell Motel" (Kannibalen Records 2017)
- "Lions" with Yookie (Kannibalen Records 2017)
- "Zombie" with Panther (Kannibalen Records 2018)
- "Hacker" with Blanke (Kannibalen Records 2019)
- "Download the Future" (Kannibalen Records 2019)
- "Everything" with Tmrrw (Kannibalen Records 2019)
- "Spiders" with Yookie (Kannibalen Records 2019)
- "Let's Get It" (Kannibalen Records 2019)
- "Time Travel" with Blanke (Kannibalen Records 2020)
- "Frequency" with Atliens (Kannibalen Records 2020)
- "Killzone" (Kannibalen Records 2020)
- "Doomsday" featuring Macntaj (Kannibalen Records 2020)
- "Resistance" with Hairitage featuring Hyro the Hero (Kannibalen Records 2020)
- "Lifeline" with Kayzo featuring Point North (Kannibalen Records / Welcome Records 2021)
- "Creature" featuring JT Roach (Kannibalen Records 2021)
- "Leaders" with Alborosie (Kannibalen Records 2021)
- "Wild Kids" with Youngr (Kannibalen Records 2021)
- "Cheatcode" with Hairitage featuring Hyro The Hero (Kannibalen Records 2021)
- "Prayers" with Kai Wachi featuring Wasiu (Kannibalen Records 2022)
- "Front Man" with Atliens (Kannibalen Records 2022)
- "Deathstalker" with Yookie (Kannibalen Records 2022)

=== Remixes ===
- Dabin - "Electropolitics" (Kannibalen Records 2012)
- Rage Against the Machine - "Sleep Now in the Fire" (2015)
- Black Tiger Sex Machine - "Rezorecta VIP" (Kannibalen Records 2017)
- Kai Wachi - "Demons" (Kannibalen Records 2017)
- Excision and Illenium featuring Shallows - "Gold (Stupid Love)" (2019)

=== Appearances ===
- Kannibalen Christmas Stocking (Kannibalen Records 2011)
- Free Flesh (Kannibalen Records 2015)
