= Babatunde (song) =

Single by Peekaboo and G-Rex
- Released: 7 September 2018
- Genre: Freeform bass
- Length: 2:41
- Label: Wakaan
- Producers: Matthew Lucas; Jake Sweeney

Peekaboo singles chronology
"U Don't Know Me" (2018)	"Babatunde" (2018)	"Illusion" (2019)

G-Rex singles chronology
"Wook Blaster" (2018)	"Babatunde" (2018)	"Heretic" (2019)

"Babatunde" is a song by American dubstep producers Peekaboo and G-Rex. It was released on September 7, 2018, by Wakaan, a record label owned by Swedish electronic musician Liquid Stranger. A 6-track remix extended play of the song was later released on January 25, 2019.

== Background and release ==
Peekaboo and G-Rex first collaborated with each other on a remix of the song "Witch Doctor" by ATLiens, released as part of the Invasion EP remix album. After seeing how well they worked together on the remix, the two decided to produce an original collaborative track together. The song appeared in various DJ sets prior to release, including an appearance in a Noiseporn Exclusive Mix, which premiered on April 27, 2018.

On September 7, 2018, the song was released as a digital download on international digital stores through Wakaan, as well as being released through various music streaming services. As of 22 February 2019, the song has gained around 485,000 plays on SoundCloud and over 160,000 views on the UKF Dubstep YouTube channel. The song is named after Peekaboo's Postmates driver, who had delivered him tacos during the song's production.

== Remixes ==
A remix extended play of "Babatunde" was released on January 25, 2019. It features five remixes by various artists plus a VIP mix of the song produced by Peekaboo and G-Rex. The remixes contained in the extended play were each produced by Tynan, Dirt Monkey, Eliminate, Luzcid, and Um. On release, G-Rex wrote about the selection of artists chosen to remix the song, writing:

"For this remix EP, we went out and handpicked not only some amazing artists, but our great friends as well to remix our track. Each remix comes with their own unique style that makes the entire package cohesive and interesting."

— G-Rex briefly talking about the artist selection process for the remix extended play

Writing for River Beats, Caleb Beck compared the VIP mix to the original song, describing the former as "tighter, higher, and meaner, with more compression and fury all-around, and a second half that sounds denser and more organic, adding new layers of terror to the original." River Rafting's Chad Downs called the extended play a "proverbial journey through filthy sound to which listeners will certainly break their necks."

== Critical reception ==
"Babatunde" became a landmark proponent in the 'freeform bass' dubstep microgenre scene and was well received by most critics, with most noting the song's minimalist yet heavy structure. James Smith of River Beats described the song as one that sounds like it's attempting to "resurrect a demon through a computer screen", noting the songs' incorporation of trap and dubstep. Writing for EDM Identity, Jayce Ullah-Blocks praised the song, calling it an "unbridled freeform behemoth", describing it as simplistic yet "takes the definition of 'heavy' to a deeper level." Relentless Beats' Sophie Prince stated that the song was a "well-deserved" collaboration, pointing out the songs' heavy use of noise samples and vocals and calling the song "menacingly heavy". Sarah Dickens of Trillvo called the song a "simple bass-face inducing track that is bound to shake the earth at every live set." Your EDM's Matthew Meadow used the song as an example of why Peekaboo makes for "such an enthralling artist", later writing that the two artists had "created a uniquely terrifying and original tune that would work well in any set."

== Track listing ==
Digital download – Single
No.	Title	Length
1.	"Babatunde"	2:41
Total length:		2:41

Digital download – Remixes
No.	Title	Length
1.	"Babatunde" (VIP)	3:18
2.	"Babatunde" (Dirt Monkey Remix)	2:05
3.	"Babatunde" (Eliminate Remix)	2:36
4.	"Babatunde" (Tynan Remix)	4:08
5.	"Babatunde" (Luzcid Remix)	3:56
6.	"Babatunde" (Um.. Remix)	2:59
Total length:		19:02

== Release history ==
Region	Date	Format	Version	Label	Ref.
Worldwide	September 7, 2018	Digital download	"Babatunde"	Wakaan	
Worldwide	January 25, 2019	Digital download	Babatunde Remix EP	Wakaan	
