= Noise vs. Beauty =

Album by Bassnectar

Studio album by Bassnectar
- Released: June 24, 2014
- Genre: Electronic, dubstep, drumstep, glitch
- Length: 59:21
- Label: Amorphous
- Producer: Lorin Ashton

Bassnectar chronology
Vava Voom (2012)	Noise vs. Beauty (2014)	Into the Sun (2015)

Noise vs. Beauty is the eighth studio album by American DJ and record producer Bassnectar, released on June 24, 2014, by Amorphous Music. The album has been supported by multiple festivals he has played through 2014 and followed by the NVSB tour. An album titled NVSB Remixes was released digitally on October 28, 2014, consisting of remixes of tracks from Noise vs. Beauty, as well as new songs.

== Reception ==
The album debuted on Billboard 200 at No. 21, No. 1 on the Top Dance/Electronic Albums chart, selling 13,000 copies in its first week.

== Track listing ==
No.	Title	Length
1.	"F.U.N." (with Seth Drake)	4:42
2.	"Now" (featuring Rye Rye)	4:06
3.	"Loco Ono"	3:05
4.	"You & Me" (featuring W. Darling)	4:04
5.	"Lost in the Crowd" (with Jantsen featuring Fashawn and Zion I)	3:33
6.	"Ephemeral"	4:39
7.	"Hold On" (featuring TURSI)	2:39
8.	"Noise" (featuring Donnis)	4:07
9.	"The Future" (featuring Jenna Sousa)	3:51
10.	"Open Up" (featuring Simon Morel)	3:36
11.	"Mystery Song" (with Amp Live featuring BEGINNERS)	2:56
12.	"Don't Hate the 808" (featuring Lafa Taylor)	3:17
13.	"Gnar" (with The Upbeats)	3:49
14.	"Flash Back"	4:11
15.	"So Butterfly" (2014 version)	6:17
Total length:		59:21

== Charts ==
=== Weekly charts ===
Chart (2014)	Peak position
US Billboard 200	21
US Top Dance Albums (Billboard)	1
US Independent Albums (Billboard)	5

=== Year-end charts ===
Chart (2014)	Position
US Dance/Electronic Albums (Billboard)	23
