= Into the Sun (Bassnectar album) =

Studio album by Bassnectar
- Released: June 30, 2015
- Genres: Electronic, dubstep, trip hop, downtempo, drumstep, glitch
- Length: 2:17:17; 66:00 (without "Mixtape 13")

Bassnectar chronology
Noise vs. Beauty (2014)	Into the Sun (2015)	Unlimited (2016)

Into the Sun is the ninth studio album by Bassnectar, released on June 30, 2015.

== Reception ==
The album debuted on Billboard 200 at No. 46, No. 1 on the Top Dance/Electronic Albums chart, selling 10,000 copies in its first week. It sold 41,000 copies as of June 2016.

== Track listing ==
Track listing adopted from iTunes.

No.	Title	Length
1.	"Chasing Heaven" (with Levitate)	5:18
2.	"No Way (Bassnectar Remix)" (with The Naked and Famous)	4:33
3.	"Into the Sun"	4:16
4.	"Speakerbox" (featuring Lafa Taylor)	4:42
5.	"The Mystery Spot" (with G Jones)	4:29
6.	"Sideways" (featuring Zion I and Z-Trip)	3:04
7.	"Rose Colored Bass (Bassnectar Remix)" (with David Heartbreak)	3:43
8.	"Generate"	3:42
9.	"One Thing (Bassnectar Remix)" (with Psymbionic & Of The Trees featuring Cristina Soto)	3:43
10.	"Science Fiction"	5:13
11.	"Blow" (2015 Version)	4:01
12.	"Sommarfågel (Bassnectar Remix)" (with Wintergatan)	2:17
13.	"Dorfex Bos (Bassnectar Remix)" (2015 Version; with Dorfex Bos)	5:06
14.	"Breathing" (2015 Version)	3:07
15.	"Dubuasca" (2015 Version)	3:28
16.	"Enter the Chamber" (2015 Version)	6:06
17.	"Mixtape 13" (Continuous Mix)	71:16
Total length:		2:17:17

Notes

- "Speakerbox" samples the hook from the Masia One song Warrior's Tongue, from the album Bootleg Culture (2012).
- "Mixtape 13" is a continuous mix of all other songs from the album, though there are also a few other songs mixed in (such as an edit of San Holo's “Double Oreo” and Stylust Beats' remix of Bassnectar's song “Loco Ono”).

== Charts ==
Chart (2015)	Peak position
US Billboard 200	46
US Top Dance Albums (Billboard)	1
US Independent Albums (Billboard)	4
