= Mimi Page =

American singer-songwriter (born 1987)

- Born: February 2, 1987 (age 39)
- Origin: Los Angeles, California
- Genres: Downtempo, dream pop, trip hop, ambient, electronic, New Age, space music, contemporary classical, deep house, melodic dubstep
- Occupations: Singer-songwriter, composer, record producer, sound designer
- Website: www.mimipage.com

Mimi Page (born February 2, 1987) is an American singer-songwriter, record producer, and composer.

== Musical style ==
Page's original music blends ethereal vocals with piano-driven, atmospheric soundscapes. She attributes her ethereal sound to her use of reverb, delay, and layering techniques in post production. Page's primary instruments are the piano and synthesizer with production and beat creation in Logic Pro.

== Life and career ==
=== 1987–2007 ===
Mimi Page was born in Los Angeles on February 2, 1987. Page was raised by her mother Cheryl Clark, a triple threat dancer who performed and toured in acclaimed Broadway shows Chicago, A Chorus Line and Pippin. From age two to five, Page accompanied her mother on multiple international tours. On her early years, Page reflects; "We pretty much lived as nomads in hotels and on the tour bus. I'd rehearse her lines with her which helped me learn how to read. I attribute a lot of my creativity to my childhood as I was constantly surrounded by music and dancing." Page then relocated to a suburban area of Las Vegas to begin grade school and attain a stable living environment. At age five, she began composing on the piano. At age 11, Page returned to Los Angeles. At 16, she transferred to the Alexander Hamilton Music Academy to pursue her training on the piano. She continued to compose instrumental music, but concealed her desire to sing due to shyness. Page shifted her artistic focus dramatically when discovering the Electronic Music program at the school. After learning to digitally record and manipulate her vocals in class, Page began recording and producing her own original music. During her senior year of high school Page self-released a collection of the songs recorded in her class and publicly shared them on Myspace. In 2006, Page attended college at the University of California, Santa Cruz to further her studies in Composition and Electronic Music. In 2007 she left the university and moved to Hollywood to study recording engineering at Musician's Institute. On the shift of studies, Page says "I wanted to get away from the formal structure of classical music and learn more of the techniques of recording. It's really tough when you’re an up and coming artist to afford studio time, so I wanted to be able to cheaply build my own studio and produce my own albums." During this time, Page continued to upload original music through Myspace, YouTube, and Facebook, which were all recorded and produced in her studio apartment.

=== 2008–2012 ===
After submitting her demos to multiple radio stations, Page gained airplay on Sirius/XM Chill and Soma FM Lush with several of her unreleased songs. May 2010 Page digitally self-released her first EP A Lullaby for the Lonely through CD Baby (which originally included singles "New" and "Come What May"). In August she released two additional singles, "Gravity" and "This Fire". MTV's The Real World licensed "This Fire" in an episode which launched the song to No. 11 on iTunes and No. 1 on Amazon.com's electronic charts. Page was then approached by bass music record label Simplify. Recordings and offered a one-album deal for a remix album for her songs off of "A Lullaby For The Lonely" and given two options; to be remixed exclusively by the label's top producers, or host a remix contest and allow both established and novice producers to submit. Page chose to throw the remix contest and made her vocal stems downloadable to the public for a limited time. As a result, multiple EDM Blogs promoted the contest and hundreds of entries were received. Both Page and the label chose the top 12 and on June 8, 2011, the album "Harmonious Heartbeats" was released. Following the album release, Page proceeded to collaborate on original material with several of the remixers on "Harmonious Heartbeats". In July 2011, a collaboration between Page and Shotgun Radio titled "A Bad Place" was independently released. Simplify. Recordings offered a second remix album deal for the single.

Page then teamed up with Warren Huart to finish her full-length record Breathe Me In. Originally intended for another self-release, Page funded the album production with fan donations through Kickstarter.com. In August 2011, she was offered a distribution deal for Breathe Me In by record label Gonzo Multimedia (the umbrella company of Voice Print Records). To anticipate the album, Gonzo Multimedia re-released "This Fire" on a new EP on December 1, 2011. On February 14, 2012, Breathe Me In was released on Gonzo Multimedia's new imprint Hunter Records. The album received positive reviews in the music blogosphere. Stereo Subversion magazine describes Breathe Me In as "a potent mix of sultry down tempo numbers, emotional pop-tronica, and thought-provoking ballads. Her vocals draw you in like a tractor beam, and the musical variety is downright dizzying." The Indie Times notes "Page's haunting, yet sensual vocals keep you fixated with each song you hear." Electronic Music Blog "The Untz" ranked her No. 2 on their list of "Top 15 Producers with Pipes."

A remix of "A Bad Place" by dubstep producer Minnesota caught the ear of Lorin Ashton (Bassnectar) and was added to his "Amorphous Music Mixtape Volume 7" release. Ashton subsequently contacted Page and asked her to co-write a song for his upcoming album Vava Voom. In April 2012 their collaboration "Butterfly" was released as track 9 on Vava Voom. Vava Voom debuted at No. 34 on the Billboard Top 200 charts. In a review of Vava Voom, music critic Jim DeRogatis described Page's vocals on "Butterfly" as "gorgeous." A second collaboration with Page, Bassnectar and British Drum and Bass duo DC Breaks titled "Breathless" was released on Ashton's "Freestyle EP" in October 2012 which debuted at No. 1 on iTunes Electronic Charts, No. 79 on the Billboard Top 200 charts and attained airplay on BBC Radio 1. In February 2013 FOX's television series The Following featured "Butterfly" in episode "The Fall" and launched "Butterfly" up to No. 4 on iTunes' Electronic charts. "Butterfly" gained radio play on Sirius/XM Chill, KCRW, and other syndicated stations. Billboard placed "Butterfly" at number 4 on their list of Top 10 Bassnectar songs.

=== 2013–2015 ===
Page's music garnered the attention of Zak Bagans, creator and star of Travel Channel's series Ghost Adventures, and was invited to write an original song for his show. Page recorded and produced an original song titled "Requiem" which has since been used as a recurring theme in multiple episodes of season 7 and season 8, most notably in the "New Orleans" episode which centered around the devastation of Hurricane Katrina. She additionally appeared as a guest investigator in season 7's "The Glen Tavern Inn" episode and accompanied actress Brit Morgan, Zak Bagans, and the rest of the cast for an overnight "lockdown" of the haunted hotel. In March 2013, she self-released the Requiem EP featuring "Requiem" and a new original song, "Treading the Abyss", which gained airplay on Sirius/XM Chill. Music blog Heartache with Hard Work ranked Requiem No. 26 on their list of "top 30 albums of 2013", expressing "Treading the Abyss" as "a spare percussive core with otherworldly vocals and what may be the greatest EDM hook I can think of."

May 2013, Page, Minnesota, and Seven Lions released their collaborative single "Fevers" on Skrillex's label Owsla. The single gained airplay on Sirius/XM BPM and Electric Area. September 2013, Page's collaboration "Lost in Me" with Paris Blohm debuted on Trance label Enhanced Music which gained airplay on both Sirius/XM BPM and Electric Area stations and received a wide array of support by EDM heavyweights Tiesto, BT and Tritonal. The Untz ranked Page No. 3 on their list of "Top 10 Female EDM Artists" quoting: "Most people associate the name Mimi Page with her illustrious collection of vocal features for artists like Seven Lions, Bassnectar, and Kezwik, but there is so much more to the young singer than meets the eye. Or ear in this case. The ever-evolving musician has released an album and multiple EPs apart from the confines of traditional dance music, creating a bewitching amalgam of dreamy instrumentations and disarmingly beautiful melodies."

On November 13, 2015, Page released her second studio album The Ethereal Blues, which she self-produced and released on her own label. Blog "Heartache for Hard Work" ranked it No. 3 on their annual list of top albums of 2015 describing it as "orchestral sweeps, trip-hop beats, lyrics that speak of a deep well of sadness, but which elevate rather than weigh down. It's also truly an album to be experienced in totality. For all the wondrous beauty of the individual components, the true genius is in the careful layering of possibilities from song to song. The process is dialectical: endlessly provocative, eternally haunting".

Page's collaboration with composer Inon Zur "The Path of Destiny", the theme song for the video game Sword Coast Legends, was nominated for a Hollywood Music in Media Award. Another collaboration with Rhys Fulber of Conjure One called "Oceanic" opened Armin van Buuren's A State of Trance podcast to promote Conjure One's new album Holoscenic which peaked at No. 14 on Billboard's Dance/Electronic album charts.

=== 2016–present ===
In May 2016, Page collaborated with composer Inon Zur on "Song of the Fog", a cue in the score of Fallout 4's DLC Far Harbor. In September the band Delerium released their 15th studio album Mythologie with four songs co-written and performed by Page. The album debuted at number 7 on the Billboard Dance/Electronic album charts. August 2016, Page released her original score of The Trade, a documentary about the life and career of CZW wrestler Sick Nick Mondo. In April 2017, Page collaborated with composer Gareth Coker as the character of Black Jack for his score of Insomniac Games' VR release The Unspoken. May 2017, video game developer Riot Games features "Butterfly" in their League of Legends promotional animation video for their champion Lux titled "Lux: Binding Light", animated by Glen Keane. June 2017, Page collaborated with Bassnectar on the single "Was Will Be" on his EP Reflective Part 1. In December 2017, Page released her third solo EP Hope For The Haunted. Her 4th solo EP "Dark Before the Dawn" was released on November 11, 2018, with an announcement of a new full-length album "Echoes of Eternity."

== Live performances ==
In support of the release of Breathe Me In, Page toured the east coast as the opening support for Jefferson Starship on Paul Kantner's 71st birthday tour. Page has also performed her collaborative songs live, most notably "Butterfly" with Bassnectar at the Do Lab's 2012 Lightning in a Bottle Festival, Red Rocks Amphitheatre, and Nashville's Bridgestone Arena.

== Discography ==
=== Solo studio albums ===
Year	Title	Role	Notes
2010	A Lullaby for the Lonely (EP)	Recording Artist, songwriter, producer, Mixer	
2012	Breathe Me In	Recording Artist, songwriter, producer, Mixer	Additional Producer: Warren Huart, Additional Mixing: Robin Holden, Mastering: Rob Beaton
2013	Requiem (EP)	Recording Artist, songwriter, producer, Mixer	
2015	The Ethereal Blues	Recording Artist, songwriter, producer, Mixer	Additional Mixing: Mehdi Hassine, Mastering: Keath Reds
2017	Hope for the Haunted (EP)	Recording Artist, songwriter, producer, Mixer	
2018	Dark Before The Dawn (EP)	Recording Artist, songwriter, producer, Mixer	Mastering: Mehdi Hassine

== Filmography ==
=== Film and television ===
Year	Title	Role	Notes
2009	Pie and Coffee	Composer	Short film (co-composer with Marcelo Cesena)
2011	Let Us Prey	Composer	Short Film
2011	Tyranny	Composer	TV series – 2 episodes
2013	Ghost Adventures	Herself	Episode: "The Glen Tavern Inn"
2015	Finding Beauty in the Rubble	Composer	Documentary Short Film
2017	Allen	Composer	Short film
2017	The Trade	Composer, songwriter, Vocalist	Documentary feature film
2018	Demon House	Composer, Vocalist	Documentary feature film
2018	Ghost Adventures	Herself	Episode: "The Ally of Darkness"

=== Video games ===
Year	Title	Role	Notes
2013	Rift: Storm Legion	Vocalist	Composer: Inon Zur
2015	Sword Coast Legends	Vocalist, songwriter	Composer: Inon Zur, Songwriters: Inon Zur, Ian Nickus
2016	Fallout 4: Far Harbor	Vocalist	Composer: Inon Zur
2016	Eagle Flight	Vocalist	Composer: Inon Zur
2016	The Unspoken	Vocalist	Composer: Gareth Coker
2017	Ancient Frontier	Composer, Songwriter, Vocalist	
2017	Durango	Vocalist	Composer: Inon Zur
2018	Ancient Frontier: Steel Shadows	Composer, Songwriter, Vocalist	
2019	The Lighthouse	Composer, Songwriter, Vocalist, Sound Design, Voice Actor	
2021	Lineage W - A World Pledged With Blood	Composer, Vocalist	
2022	She Dreams Elsewhere	Composer, Songwriter, Vocalist	

== Collaborations ==
Year	Song	Artist	Role(s)	Appears on	Label
2009	"Backlash"	Shotgun Radio and DJ Swamp	Featured Vocals	Album: Extermination of Undesirables	Shotgun Radio Records
2011	"The Burning"	Phrenik and Kelly Dean	Featured Vocals, Vocal Production, Songwriter, Lyrics	Album: Subpressure Volume Two	Sub Pressure
2011	"Exodus"	Phrenik	Featured Vocals, Vocal Production, Songwriter, Lyrics	EP: Exodus	Simplify. Recordings
2011	"Sublight"	The Walton Hoax	Featured Vocals, Vocal Production, Songwriter	EP: Chemical Burn	!MPACT Recordings
2011	"Neverending World"	Skytree	Featured Vocals, Vocal Production, Songwriter, Lyrics, Piano	Album: Crystal Consciousness	Treedub Recordings
2011	"Nothing at All", "Pretty Boxes", Eye of Your Storm", You Lead, I'll Follow	Elfkowitz	Featured Vocals, Vocal Production, Songwriter, Lyrics, Piano, Synthesizer	EP: Shadow Dancing	Daly City Records
2011	"A Bad Place"	Shotgun Radio	Featured Vocals, Songwriter, Lyrics	Single	Simplify. Recordings
2012	"Spy Games"	Phrenik	Featured Vocals, Vocal Production, Songwriter, Lyrics	EP: Spy Games: Chapter 2	Simplify. Recordings
2012	"The Reminder"	Spankinz	Featured Vocals, Vocal Production, Songwriter, Lyrics, Synthesizer	Single	Self-released (sAuce)
2012	"Let Go"	Kezwik	Vocals, Vocal Production, Songwriter, Lyrics	EP: Tame	Simplify. Recordings
2012	"The Night and the Skyline"	Kezwik	Vocals, Vocal Production, Songwriter, Lyrics	EP: Beta	Muti Music
2012	"Butterfly"	Bassnectar	Featured Vocals, Vocal Production, Songwriter, Lyrics, Piano, Synthesizer, Production	Album: Vava Voom – U.S Billboard 200 peak: #34	Amorphous Music
2012	"Breathless"	Bassnectar and DC Breaks	Featured Vocals, Vocal Production, Songwriter, Lyrics	EP: Freestyle EP – US Billboard 200 peak: #79	Amorphous Music
2013	"Life"	Clark Kent	Featured Vocals, Vocal Production, Songwriter, Lyrics	Single	
2013	"Everything"	Yinyues	Featured Vocals, Vocal Production, Songwriter, Lyrics	Single	SMW Recordings
2013	"Fevers"	Seven Lions and Minnesota	Featured Vocals, Songwriter, Lyrics	Single	Owsla Nest
2013	"I Believe"	DJ Eye	Featured Vocals, Songwriter, Lyrics	Album: Incorrectly Diagnosed	
2013	"Lost in Me"	Paris Blohm	Featured Vocals, Vocal Production, Songwriter, Lyrics	Single	Enhanced Recordings
2013	"Starlet"	Hybrid Minds	Featured Vocals, Vocal Production, Music Production, Songwriter, Lyrics, Piano, Synthesizer	Album: Mountains	Spearhead Records
2014	"Sailing the Sky"	Paris Blohm	Featured Vocals, Vocal Production, Songwriter, Lyrics	Single	Revealed Recordings
2014	"Falling In"	Illenium and Said the Sky	Featured Vocals, Vocal Production, Songwriter, Lyrics	Single	Simplify. Recordings
2014	"Sand", "I Know"	Mr. Projectile	Featured Vocals, Vocal Production, Songwriter, Lyrics	Singles	No.–No. 200
2015	"The Path of Destiny"	Inon Zur	Featured Vocals, Songwriter, Lyrics	Soundtrack: Sword Coast Legends (Video Game)	Inon Zur
2015	"Oceanic"	Conjure One	Featured Vocals, Vocal Production, Songwriter, Lyrics	Album: Holoscenic – U.S Billboard Electronic peak: #14	Armada Music
2016	"Searching"	Twofold	Featured Vocals, Songwriter, Lyrics	Single	
2016	"La Tour Eiffel"	Inon Zur	Featured Vocals	Soundtrack: Eagle Flight (Video Game)	Ubisoft Music Publishing
2016	"Blue Fires", "Angels", "Made To Move", "Dark Visions"	Delerium	Featured Vocals, Vocal Production, songwriter, Lyrics, Piano, Synthesizer	Album: Mythologie – U.S. Billboard Electronic peak: #7	Metropolis Records
2016	"Spiritus Cultris", "Praecisione", "Vaframentum"	Gareth Coker	Featured Vocals	Soundtrack: The Unspoken (Video Game)	Gareth Coker
2017	"Swimming Through Dreams"	John Fryer / Black Needle Noise	Featured Vocals, Vocal Production, Songwriter, Lyrics	Single	Black Needle Noise Records
2017	"Was Will Be"	Bassnectar	Featured Vocals, Songwriter, Lyrics	EP: "Reflective EP Part 1" – U.S Billboard Electronic peak: #5	Amorphous Music
2017	"Song For The Fog"	Inon Zur	Featured Vocals	Soundtrack: Fallout 4: Music from Far Harbor and Nuka World (Video Game)	Bethesda Softworks
2019	"There Is Peace Beyond"	Nox Vahn	Featured Vocals, Vocal Production, Songwriter, Lyrics	Album: Anjunadeep 10, There Is Peace Beyond EP	Anjunadeep
2019	"Follow Me"	Nox Vahn and Marsh	Featured Vocals, Vocal Production, Songwriter, Lyrics	Album: Anjunabeats Volume 14, Prospect EP	Anjunabeats, Anjunadeep
2019	"Over The Stones of The Grey", "Tale of a Knight"	Inon Zur	Featured Vocals, Songwriter, Lyrics	Album: Into The Storm	Sony Masterworks
2020	"Eu Topos"	Marsh	Featured Vocals, Vocal Production, Songwriter, Lyrics	Album: Eu Topos EP	Anjunadeep
2020	"Dream Of Love"	Nox Vahn	Featured Vocals, Vocal Production, Songwriter, Lyrics	Album: Anjunadeep 11	Anjunadeep
2020	"For Those We Knew"	Jody Wisternoff	Featured Vocals, Vocal Production, Songwriter, Lyrics	Album: Nightwhisper	Anjunadeep
2020	"Foss"	Marsh	Featured Vocals, Vocal Production, Songwriter, Lyrics	Album: Lailonie	Anjunadeep
2021	"The Future"	iLL-Gates and Jordana	Featured Vocals, Vocal Production, Piano, Songwriter, Lyrics	Album: The Arrival	Producer Dojo
2023	"Within Me"	Wassu	Featured Vocals, Vocal Production, Songwriter, Lyrics	Album: Long Ago EP	Monstercat Silk
2023	"Falling Back To You", “Remember Love”, Absolution	Delerium	Featured Vocals, Vocal Production, Piano, Synths, Programming, Production, Songwriter, Lyrics	Album: Signs	Metropolis
2024	"Wondering Infinite"	Jody Wisternoff	Featured Vocals, Vocal Production, Songwriter, Lyrics	Album: My World	Anjunadeep
2024	"Erosion Through Time"	Bill Leeb	Featured Vocals, Vocal Production, Songwriter, Lyrics	Album: Model Kolapse	Metropolis Records

== Awards and nominations ==
Year	Award	Nominated work	Category	Result
2015	Hollywood Music in Media Awards	Sword Coast Legends – "The Path of Destiny" (with Inon Zur)	Best Original Song – Video Game	Nominated
2015	Annual Game Music Awards	Sword Coast Legends – "The Path of Destiny" (with Inon Zur)	Vocal Theme – Video Game	Nominated
2015	Audio Network Guild Awards	Sword Coast Legends – "The Path of Destiny" (with Inon Zur)	Best Original Song: Pop	Nominated
2016	Lift-Off Festival Season Awards	Finding Beauty in the Rubble	Best Music Score	Nominated
2016	Lift-Off Festival Season Awards	The Trade	Best Music Score	Nominated
