= Dubtonic Kru =

Jamaican reggae band

Dubtonic Kru are a live reggae band from Jamaica. After earning the title "Best New Band in the World 2010 - 2011" at the Global Battle of the Bands international contest and many other achievements, they performed in Ostróda.

== Awards ==
In 2011, Dubtonic Kru was honoured by the United States House of Congress and was presented with a Congressional Proclamation by Congresswoman Yvette Clarke. They were awarded the Simba award by the Coalition to Preserve Reggae (CPR). These achievements amazed the Jamaican music industry and gave more credence to the recent revival of Jamaica's live music scene and a more rapid growth of bands coming to the fore.

== Musical style ==
reggae
