= Sayr =

In the theory of Arabic music, sayr is the abstract concept that for a given maqam, there is a traditional or expected sequence of different ajnas that influences melodies and entire songs in that maqam. It is not a deterministic thing like "jins A must always be followed by jins B" in some maqam, but a cultural understanding that certain motions are expected within the musical idiom, while others would be new and surprising.

The Arabic word sayr (سير) means "course" or "progress" and refers to the usual course of melody through the different areas of the maqam, in particular its ajnas.

Traditional music theorists tended to analyze sayr in a rather shallow way, often merely describing a maqam as having an "ascending" or "descending" sayr, or stating that one jins is used when ascending and an alternate jins when descending. The concept is about much more than a simple sense of direction, however, and some maqamat have an elaborate interconnected network of pathways through the different ajnas, varying from traditional or even cliché sequences all the way to rare, idiosyncratic modulations only known from a handful of pieces.
