= Cozza Frenzy =

Studio album by Bassnectar
- Released: September 29, 2009
- Recorded: 2007–2009
- Genre: Dubstep; EDM; big beat
- Length: 1:15:15
- Label: Om Records
- Producer: Lorin Ashton

Bassnectar chronology
Art of Revolution (2009)	Cozza Frenzy (2009)	Timestretch (2010)

Cozza Frenzy is the fifth full-length album by American electronic dance music artist Bassnectar, released on September 29, 2009 from Om Records after 3 years of production. The album of 15 songs contains collaborations with artists including Fever Ray, Zumbi of Zion I, Mr. Projectile, and Capital J.

== Track listing ==
No.	Title	Length
1.	"Boombox"	4:48
2.	"Cozza Frenzy"	3:44
3.	"Cozza Frenzy (Mega-Bass Remix)"	6:40
4.	"The Churn of the Century"	4:03
5.	"Love Here (Bassnectar Remix)"	6:41
6.	"Backpack Rehab (Feat. Gates DPL)"	6:10
7.	"Teleport Massive (Feat. Zumbi)"	4:32
8.	"West Coast Lo-Fi Rides Again"	4:27
9.	"When I Grow Up (Bassnectar Remix)"	6:02
10.	"I Am a Laser (Feat. Double You)"	5:42
11.	"Window Seat"	7:16
12.	"I Wish I Was a Hipster"	1:31
13.	"Are You Ready (Feat. Capital J)"	2:51
14.	"Boombox (Bassnectar & ill.Gates Remix)"	6:24
15.	"Before We Dissolve"	4:24
Total length:		1:15:15

== Charts ==
Chart	Peak position
US Top Dance/Electronic Albums (Billboard)	24
