= Unlimited (Bassnectar album) =

Studio album by Bassnectar
- Released: June 17, 2016
- Genre: Electronic, dubstep, trip hop, downtempo, drumstep, glitch
- Length: 1:03:37
- Label: Amorphous Music
- Producer: Lorin Ashton

Bassnectar chronology
Into the Sun (2015)	Unlimited (2016)	All Colors (2020)

Unlimited is the tenth studio album by Bassnectar, released on June 17, 2016. Bassnectar stated that the goal of the album was to build a "sonic collage".

== Reception ==
Professional ratings
Review scores
Source	Rating
Exclaim!	9/10

Writing for Exclaim!, Dylan Barnabe praised the album's "amorphous style" and hailed it as "a welcome addition to the veteran's discography."

The album debuted at No. 49 on Billboard 200, No. 1 on the Top Dance/Electronic Albums chart, selling 9,000 copies in its first week.

== Track listing ==
Unlimited
No.	Title	Length
1.	"Reaching Out"	4:54
2.	"Music Is the Drug" (with LUZCID)	4:14
3.	"TKO" (featuring Rye Rye & Zion I)	2:38
4.	"Mind Tricks" (with G Jones featuring Lafa Taylor)	3:53
5.	"Unlimited Combinations"	5:36
6.	"Level Up" (with Levit∆te featuring Macntaj)	4:17
7.	"Shampion Chip"	3:36
8.	"Zodgilla"	3:45
9.	"Paracosm"	4:30
10.	"Surrender" (featuring Haley)	4:09
11.	"Dream Catcher"	4:07
12.	"Journey to the Center"	6:28
13.	"In the Beginning" (2016 version)	3:34
14.	"Rising, Rising" (Bassnectar Remix)	5:12
15.	"Inspire the Empathetic"	2:44
Total length:		1:03:37

== Charts ==
=== Weekly charts ===
Chart (2016)	Peak position
US Billboard 200	49
US Top Dance Albums (Billboard)	1

=== Year-end charts ===
Chart (2016)	Position
US Top Dance/Electronic Albums (Billboard)	12
