= Wildstyle (album) =

EP by Bassnectar
- Released: October 19, 2010
- Recorded: 2010
- Genre: Dubstep, electronica
- Length: 34:50
- Label: Amorphous Music
- Producer: Lorin Ashton

Bassnectar chronology
Timestretch (2010)	Wildstyle (2010)	Divergent Spectrum (2011)

Wildstyle is an EP by American electronic music artist Bassnectar, released on October 19, 2010 on Amorphous Music. It was the focus of his 2010 Fall Tour.

== Track listing ==
No.	Title	Length
1.	"Amp Live – Hot Right Now" (Bassnectar Remix)	4:17
2.	"Wildstyle Method" (feat. 40 Love)	5:54
3.	"Falling" (feat. Paper Machete)	4:16
4.	"The 808 Track" (feat. Mighty High Coup)	4:31
5.	"Underwater" (feat. Tina Malia)	6:31
6.	"Encore" (feat. ill.Gates)	3:29
7.	"Fun With Synthesizers"	5:52
Total length:		34:50
