= Bassnectar =

American DJ and record producer (born 1978)

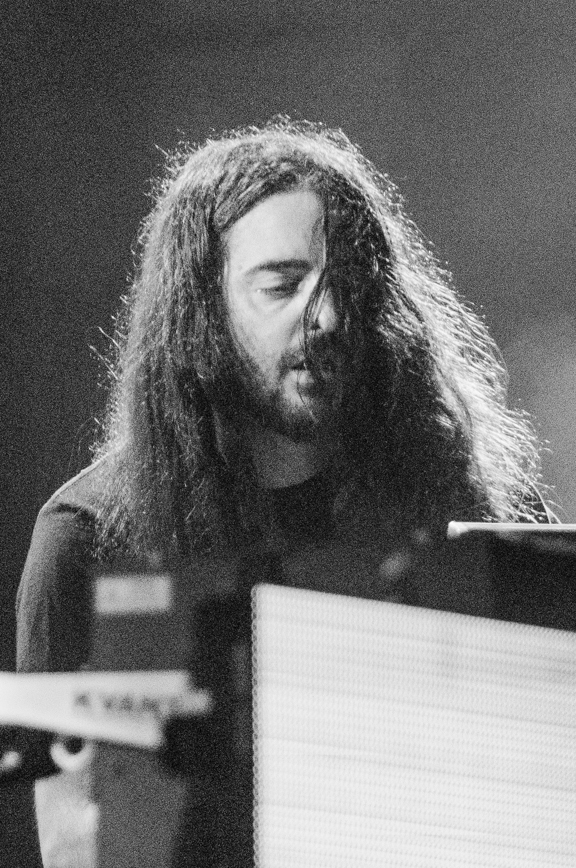
- Bassnectar performing in 2018

Background information
- Born: Lorin Ashton; February 16, 1978 (age 48); Santa Cruz, California, United States
- Genres: Dubstep; drum and bass; drumstep; electronica; IDM; breakbeat; downtempo; nu skool breaks
- Years active: 1996–present
- Labels: Amorphous; Om; Destroid; Monstercat; Owsla
- Website: bassnectar.net

Lorin Gabriel Ashton (born February 16, 1978), known professionally as Bassnectar, is an American DJ and electronic music producer.

Bassnectar became known for live shows that combined layered sound design with immersive visuals and attracted a large, dedicated fan base, and his work has been credited with helping to popularize bass-heavy electronic music in the United States. He appeared at major festivals such as Coachella, Bonnaroo, and Electric Daisy Carnival, and released charting albums including Noise vs. Beauty (2014) and Unlimited (2016).

In July 2020, following numerous allegations of sexual misconduct, Ashton announced he would take an extended hiatus from music. A lawsuit alleging he engaged in sexual abuse and human trafficking was subsequently filed by two women in April 2021, resulting in an out of-court-settlement in February 2025.

== Career ==
=== Early years ===
Ashton is a native of San Jose, California. When Ashton was 16 years old, he played in a death metal band named Pale Existence, which contributed to his heavy style of music. In 1995, he attended his first rave and was drawn to this new type of music, attending as many shows as possible, promoting shows, and eventually learning to DJ after studying electronic music production.

He continued his studies at the University of California, Santa Cruz, producing tracks using Opcode Systems Studio Vision Pro.

Ashton began DJing parties in the Bay Area and drew fanfare at Burning Man by playing multiple sets a night. Around this time, several mixtapes were released under the moniker Lorin, including Gardens, Dreamtempo Mixtape, and Freakbeat for the Beatfreaks.

Making an appearance at the 2002 Health and Harmony Festival in Santa Rosa, California, with a 16-track mixing board and alongside a Gamelan Orchestra, it is believed Ashton performed for the first time using a laptop and controller in lieu of standard DJing equipment. It was around this time that Ashton began formalizing his stage name, sometimes still booking under Lorin Bassnectar before dropping Lorin altogether. His second album Motions of Mutation from 2003 and its 2004 successor Diverse Systems of Throb both garnered support from the Bay Area electronic music community, and through frequent sightings at various parties and festivals, his notoriety continued to grow. Ashton played one such event, Shambhala music festival, in 2001–2002 before formally returning to the grounds as Bassnectar in 2003 and kicking off a string of annual performances at the festival that would continue for 11 years straight.

In 2005, Bassnectar signed with Madison House, where booking agent Jake Schneider arranged performances on club, theatre, and national touring circuits. During this period, he released the albums Underground Communication, Cozza Frenzy, as well as the EP Timestretch, and performed at major music festivals across the United States. Under Madison House, he also headlined events including Electric Forest, Tomorrowland, and North Coast Music Festival, in addition to presenting curated events such as the 2019 Freakstyle run. He also organized his own Bass Center events, including a performance at Madison Square Garden as part of Bass Center VIII.

In 2010, Bassnectar performed at Wakarusa, Camp Bisco, The All Good Music Festival, and Outside Lands.

=== 2011–2014: Touring era and mainstream breakthrough ===
In 2011, Divergent Spectrum became the first album to chart on the Billboard Top Dance/Electronic Albums, spending 35 weeks on the chart and peaking at 2nd position, marking a turning point for the Bassnectar project from a commercial standpoint.

Following the success of Divergent Spectrum, Ashton released his seventh studio album, Vava Voom, on April 10, 2012. The album debuted at No. 2 on the Billboard Top Dance/Electronic Albums chart and remained on the chart for 15 weeks. The success of Vava Voom was complemented by a sold-out North American tour. It was during this period that Bassnectar was at the height of his touring era, exceeding 200,000 ticket sales in both 2011 and 2012 and playing over 150 shows a year in venues across the United States.

Through the end of 2013 and early 2014, touring dates tapered off to allow space to produce his eighth studio album. Ashton approached the effort by first composing each song's building blocks electronically, then deconstructing them into guitar, piano, and vocal arrangements that could then be sent to various producers and artists for workshopping. The feedback collected from these workshopping efforts informed the finalized version of each track. The resulting album, Noise vs. Beauty, was released June 24, 2014 and debuted at No. 1 on the Billboard Top Dance/Electronic Albums chart, remaining on the chart for 16 weeks. The album received generally favorable reviews, with Rolling Stone giving the album a 3/5 rating and noting the release was Ashton's "most mature".

=== 2015–2019: Festival circuit and curated events ===
In 2015, Bassnectar stopped touring his own show and shifted focus towards playing the festival circuit almost exclusively, making multiple appearances at Bonnaroo, Camp Bisco, Electric Daisy Carnival, Electric Forest Festival, Lollapalooza, and Okeechobee Music & Arts Festival. However, before this time of exclusively playing festival shows, Bassnectar began orchestrating his own "curated" events.

In 2010, the first of these events, named "BassCenter", was held at the 1stBank Center in Broomfield, Colorado. As popularity and demand grew, various curated events were added over time, including "Basslights" (a collaborative event between Bassnectar and Pretty Lights), Halloween and Day of the Dead themed events (sometimes referred to as "Freakstyle" or "Dark Parties"), New Year's Eve celebrations ("NYE360"), and others, such as "Freestyle Sessions" and "Spring Gathering".

By 2016, Bassnectar's in-house productions like Bass Center at the 25,000 person capacity Dick's Sporting Goods Park in Denver were sold out and featured supporting acts including Wu Tang Clan, Flying Lotus, Lupe Fiasco, Flux Pavilion, and Porter Robinson.

In 2019, the first international concert destination event "Deja Voom" was announced, to be he held at the Barceló Maya Resort in Riviera Maya, Mexico.

=== 2020–present: Hiatus and return ===
On July 3, 2020, Ashton announced he was "stepping back" from music following multiple allegations of sexual misconduct, which he denied while acknowledging that "some of my past actions have caused pain." The announcement resulted in the cancellation of upcoming appearances, the suspension of his nonprofit Be Interactive, and the removal of several collaborative tracks from streaming platforms.

After nearly three years of public absence, a new mix titled Music for Optimists was uploaded in January 2023 to the Bassnectar Mixcloud profile. Subscribers to his newsletter also received an invitation to a new website, "UnlocktheOtherSide.com," described as a community hub.

Later that year, Ashton announced a "members-only" two-night concert at Mandalay Bay in Las Vegas (October 6–7, 2023), which marked his first scheduled public performance since 2020. The show went ahead alongside the release of his twelfth studio album, The Golden Rule. However, a planned October 27–28 show at the Harrah's Cherokee Center in Asheville, North Carolina was cancelled the same day it was announced following public backlash over the abuse allegations.

On December 30–31, Bassnectar returned to playing New Year's parties, as he had held since 2011 and continued to do through 2019, when he played a two-night show at the Palladium Times Square.

The Palladium show was followed up by an announcement a few weeks later for a new curated event, titled "Boombox ATL", which was to be held April 26–27, 2024 at the Gateway Center Arena. Subject to similar public outcry as other recent show announcements, this show was subsequently cancelled. Following this cancellation, the team attempted to relocate the show to The Theater at Virgin Hotels Las Vegas for the same dates, but on February 16, this show too was postponed, officially citing "health issues."

In September 2024, the album No Colors was released by Bassnectar. The 17-track album features collaborations with long-time contributors such as Zion I and Seasunz.

In December 2024, Bassnectar held a three-night concert series in Miami, Florida. The performances were professionally recorded and edited into a continuous live DJ mix. The resulting album, Relive Forever, premiered via livestream on May 8, 2025, and was officially released digitally on May 9, 2025.

== Legal issues ==
=== Copyright dispute with Max Hattler ===
In 2011, visuals created by German artist and experimental filmmaker Max Hattler were incorporated into Bassnectar live performances without authorization, including 1923 aka Heaven (used alongside Rollz's track "Plugged In") and Sync (paired with an unreleased Bassnectar track called "Frog Song"). Although Ashton's team contacted Hattler in 2013 about commissioning new material, no contract was finalized, and the visuals continued to be used through 2016. Hattler later objected publicly, claiming his work had been exploited commercially without permission, while Ashton argued the use was consistent with sampling practices in electronic music.

In July 2016, Hattler filed a copyright infringement lawsuit against Ashton and Bassnectar's management. Following the dispute, Hattler's visuals were no longer used after 2016; the lawsuit was later settled out of court and dismissed in June 2017.

=== Sexual misconduct allegations ===
On July 3, 2020, Ashton announced that he was "stepping back" from music following multiple allegations of sexual misconduct. He denied the allegations but acknowledged that "some of my past actions have caused pain." His announcement prompted cancellations of upcoming performances and the suspension of his nonprofit, Be Interactive.

Following the announcement, several collaborators and peers in the electronic music community voiced criticism. Vocalist Mimi Page, who appeared on tracks such as "Butterfly" and "Breathless", publicly voiced her dismay, and producer ill.Gates later stated he felt "used" and "betrayed". In response, Ashton removed most of their collaborative releases from streaming services. Other artists such as PEEKABOO and Apashe donated proceeds from past collaborations to support victims of sexual abuse.

In April 2021, two women, Rachel Ramsbottom and Alexis Bowling, filed a lawsuit against Ashton and associated entities in the United States District Court for the Middle District of Tennessee, alleging sexual abuse and human trafficking. The complaint was amended a month later to include Jenna Houston and an unnamed plaintiff ("Jane Doe #1"), although Doe later withdrew from the case. In November 2024, Judge Aleta Trauger denied a motion for summary judgment filed by Ashton's defense, allowing the case to proceed. On February 18, 2025, the lawsuit was dismissed with prejudice after the parties reached an out-of-court settlement.

In August 2025, Ashton filed a defamation lawsuit against the operator of the social-media account "Evidence Against Bassnectar", alleging a prolonged campaign of false and damaging accusations related to the sexual misconduct case.

== Legacy ==
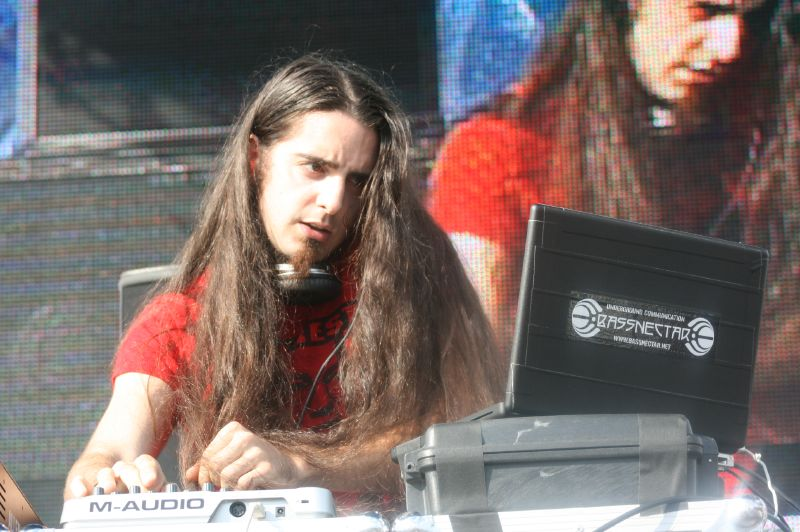
Bassnectar in 2008, using an M-Audio Trigger Finger to control tracks playing from Ableton Live

=== Live performances ===
Bassnectar concerts have been characterized by high volume sound systems, immersive lighting and visual fx, and an "amorphous" blend of genres and musical elements, both electronic and non-electronic. Reflecting on moments from his career, fellow dubstep artist Skream had this to say after watching Ashton perform at the Shambhala music festival in 2008:

“I played before Bassnectar in the Fractal Forest, I think it was, and it was insane,” he says. “I’d never seen anything like it. People were losing their absolute minds.”

— Skream

Ashton's notably adopted a style of mixing known as "controllerism", an alternative approach to live mixing compared to more traditional setups utilizing CDJs. Ashton originally made use of a pair of M-Audio Trigger Finger mini pad (MIDI) controllers, which connected to two laptops that ran Ableton Live's Session View. This enabled the selection and cueing of tracks in both instances of Ableton Live to be mixed together, which were synchronized as a safeguard against technical issues. To allow flexibility in the live performance, he also utilized custom "performance templates" designed by ill.Gates to more easily interact with the software and manipulate tracks in a creative way. After the original Trigger Finger was discontinued, Ashton commissioned 60 Works, a Minneapolis based boutique MIDI controller company, to create a new controller customized for his approach to live shows.

In addition to his unique mixing approach, another key element of Bassnectar's live shows was an emphasis on high quality sound, utilizing various sound systems over the years, including Anya, d&b audiotechnik, L-Acoustics, Meyer Sound Laboratories, and PK Audio. As early as 2012, relatively early in Ashton's touring career, several hundred-thousand watts of loudspeakers were at the disposal of Ashton's audio engineering team. Over time, this number grew even larger, with hundreds of speakers regularly being deployed for curated events. His sound system received criticism in 2016 when Bassnectar drew complaints from neighbors while performing at Dick's Sporting Goods Park in Commerce City, Colorado. While the city confirmed the show was within the permitted loudness levels, one nearby resident remarked during a city council meeting, "I thought it was an earthquake. I looked and realized it was bass."

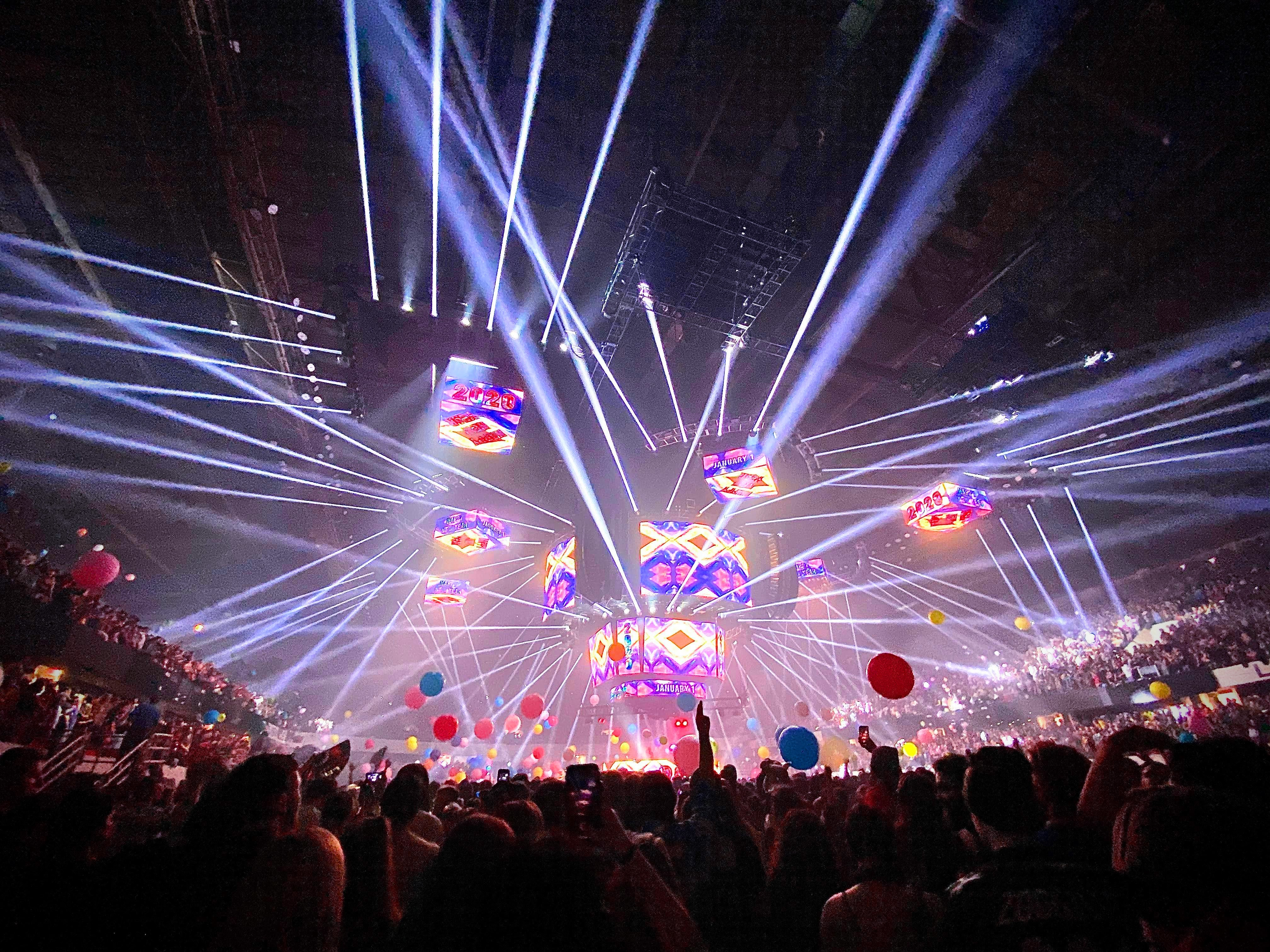
Bassnectar playing a "360" New Years show in 2019 in Louisville, KY

By 2012, the production crew had grown to dozens of people manning arrays of computers to orchestrate each performance. As part of the "Immersive Music Tour" in the fall of 2013, the "Ultimate Nerd Server" (U.N.S.), a custom Ableton plug-in designed by [namethemachine] for the production, made its debut. This plug-in allowed Ashton and his production team to more easily cue and manipulate video clips as audio tracks were being played, keeping the two elements highly synchronized in both tempo and feel, as any audio-effect manipulation while performing would affect the video as well. Complimenting these video backdrops were expansive lighting and laser arrays, sometimes eclipsing over 100 individual elements. While audio and video clips were kept in-sync via the U.N.S, lighting was approached more improvisationally, with lighting designers making choices on the fly to accompany the music.

=== Activism and community engagement ===
Ashton's personal views have been constantly intertwined with his Bassnectar persona, with public statements, interviews, samples in released music, and even portions of his live performances focused on the state of politics and human rights in the United States with a strong liberal slant. Words and sound-bytes from the likes of Martin Luther King Jr., Noam Chomsky, Fred Hampton, and Mumia Abu Jamal have been frequently recalled in various mediums used by Ashton, and in the earlier days of the project, long diatribes on stage airing grievances were not uncommon.

The Bassnectar organization is also recognized for its activist and philanthropic efforts, bringing awareness to political, social and environmental issues and directly supporting organizations such as Conscious Alliance, HeadCount, Black Lives Matter Global Network Foundation and the NAACP Legal Defense and Educational Fund, To Write Love on Her Arms, and BetterHelp. Other programs, such as "Dollar Per Bass Head", which collected $1 for every ticket sold, donated funds to charitable causes voted on by the community.

== Personal life ==
Although born in Santa Cruz, California, Ashton grew up in a hippie commune until age five, when his parents became born again Christians and left the commune. He was originally from the San Francisco Bay Area and was described by the Rolling Stone as "a long-haired neo-hippie". Through adolescence, he worked odd jobs such as a grocery bagger, children's entertainer, and census-taker. He initially identified with visual arts rather than music, creating movies with his father's camera. Eventually, Ashton came to attend Bellarmine College Preparatory.

In 2016, Ashton was diagnosed with skin cancer under his left eye, for which he underwent surgery to remove. The operation was successful.

Ashton endorsed Bernie Sanders in his candidacy for the 2016 U.S. presidential election.

Ashton has been vocally anti-Trump, offering to play a free show following the former President's impeachment in 2019. The show did not materialize.

== Discography ==
=== Studio albums ===
- Motions of Mutation (2003)
- Diverse Systems of Throb (2004)
- Mesmerizing The Ultra (2005)
- Underground Communication (2007)
- Cozza Frenzy (2009)
- Divergent Spectrum (2011)
- Vava Voom (2012)
- Noise vs. Beauty (2014)
- Into the Sun (2015)
- Unlimited (2016)
- All Colors (2020)
- The Golden Rule (2023)
- No Colors (2024)
