= Electric Forest =

Annual music festival in Rothbury, Michigan, US

Coordinates: 43.53862°N 86.3674°W

- Genre: Jam bands, electronic music
- Dates: Late June/early July
- Locations: Rothbury, Michigan, U.S.
- Years active: 2011–19; 2022–
- Founders: Insomniac Events & Madison House Presents
- Website: Electric Forest Festival

Electric Forest is a multi-genre music festival produced by Madison House Presents and Insomniac Events, with a focus on electronic music and jam band genres.

Originally named Rothbury Festival in 2008, it is held in Rothbury, Michigan at the Double JJ Resort. Rothbury Music Festival took place in 2008 and 2009 and was on hiatus for 2010.

In 2011, the event debuted under its current name, Electric Forest. The event was not held in 2020 or 2021 due to the COVID-19 pandemic. An estimated 40,000 to 50,000 people attended the festival in 2025.

The most recent festival, the 14th Electric Forest, took place from June 25th to June 28th, 2026.

== 2008 ==
The Rothbury Music Festival took place on July 3–6. The first year saw 30,202 in attendance.

=== Planning ===
On February 13, 2008, the initial lineup was released. By February 25, four additional artists were added. Steel Pulse was added on March 13, and seven artists were added in April. On May 29, the lineup was complete after six additional artists were added, including Trey Anastasio of Phish.

The spark of the idea came from Philip Blaine and Jeremy Stein, on the side of the stage, during Crystal Method at Rothbury. Then Phil brought this vision to Insomniac. From there, Electric Forest came into existence.

=== Lineup ===
==== July 3 ====
- Greensky Bluegrass
- Zappa Plays Zappa
- Disco Biscuits
- Kyle Hollingsworth Band
- Perpetual Groove
- Mickey Hart Band (featuring Steve Kimock and George Porter Jr.)
- Railroad Earth
- Underground Orchestra
- The Juan MacLean
- Lotus
- EOTO
- Motion Potion
- DJ Rootz
- DJ Cuntlicker

==== July 4 ====
- The Dynamites (Charles Walker)
- The Wailers (featuring Elan Atias)
- Snoop Dogg
- 311
- Widespread Panic
- The Beautiful Girls
- Tea Leaf Green
- Sam Beam
- Keller Williams & The WMD's
- Yonder Mountain String Band (with Jon Fishman)
- of Montreal
- Primus
- Jakob Dylan & The Gold Mountain Rebels
- Panjea (with Michael Kang)
- Bettye LaVette
- Drive-By Truckers
- Modest Mouse
- Thievery Corporation
- Bassnectar
- Sage Francis
- Flosstradamus
- Diplo
- Pnuma Trio
- Fiction Plane
- DJ Rootz
- Motion Potion
- SOJOURN

==== July 5 ====
- Four Finger Five
- State Radio
- Citizen Cope
- Michael Franti & Spearhead
- Dave Matthews Band (with Tim Reynolds)
- Dead Confederate
- The Secret Machines
- Gomez
- The Black Keys
- Slightly Stoopid
- STS9
- Trampled By Turtles
- Emmitt Nershi Band
- The Dresden Dolls
- Medeski Martin & Wood
- Derek Trucks & Susan Tedeschi Soul Stew Revival
- A3
- The Crystal Method DJ Set
- BoomBox
- Busdriver
- DJ Harry
- DJ Rekha
- Kraak & Smaak
- Sweet Japonic
- Uncle Boogie Pants
- DJ Rootz
- Motion Potion

==== July 6 ====
- Steel Pulse
- Rodrigo y Gabriela
- Trey Anastasio
- Gov't Mule
- Phil Lesh and Friends
- Brett Dennen
- MOFRO
- Colbie Caillat
- John Mayer
- Ingrid Michaelson
- Taj Mahal
- Beth Orton
- Mike Gordon
- Atmosphere with Brother Ali
- Adam Ezra Group
- Amanda Palmer
- Pnuma Live PA
- BoomBox

==== Additional performers ====
The following performers played throughout the weekend:

- Etown Radio Show
- The Greyboy Allstars
- The Stretch
- Sxip Shirey
- Yard Dogs Road Show

==== Notable collaborations ====
Several members were present from their respective bands: The String Cheese Incident, Phish, Grateful Dead, and The Allman Brothers Band. Following the addition of the Kyle Hollingsworth Band to the lineup, all six members of The String Cheese Incident were present in separate bands: Bill Nershi played with the Emmitt Nershi Band, EOTO is composed of Jason Hann and Michael Travis, Keith Moseley played in the WMDs who accompanied Keller Williams, and Michael Kang played with Panjea. Three of the four members of Phish were present: Mike Gordon, Jon Fishman, and Trey Anastasio. Phil Lesh and Mickey Hart, of Grateful Dead fame, also performed in their respective bands. Two of the current members of the Allman Brothers Band, Warren Haynes of Gov't Mule and Derek Trucks, performed in distinct bands.

David Murphy, of STS9, joined the stage with the Disco Biscuits during their Thursday night set.

== 2009 ==
The Rothbury Music Festival (not the Electric Forest Festival) officially returned in 2009. The second Rothbury was held July 2–5, over Independence Day weekend. The festival's second year expanded the think-tank discussions established the first year and continued the use of sustainable technologies.

=== Controversy ===
Because of concerns over the ownership of the ranch, as well as the potential sale of the festival grounds, there was originally uncertainty about whether a second festival would be held in 2009. A major hurdle was overcome when a federal bankruptcy judge cleared the way for a lease of the festival property between the bankruptcy trustee and AEG. A second hearing was necessary to determine if the lease was valid, because part of the land used by the festival was on a sheriff's deed and needed to be purchased by the trustee. Following the approval of this final hearing, WZZM reported the festival would return in 2009.

=== Lineup ===
Before the official lineup was released, there were rumors of artists such as Phish and Tom Petty performing, but this never occurred.

==== July 2 ====
- Fox Rocks Winner
- Toubab Krew
- Davy Knowles & Back Door Slam
- Keller Williams
- Quannum Allstars
- Lotus
- Future Rock
- The Cool Kids
- The Disco Biscuits
- Cold War Kids
- Break Science ft. Adam Deitch
- Tom Butwin Band

==== July 3 ====
- King Sunny Adé & His African Beats
- Brett Dennen
- Steppin' In It
- Rachel Goodrich
- Rebelution
- Martin Sexton
- G. Love & Special Sauce
- Broken Social Scene
- Femi Kuti & The Positive Force
- The White Buffalo
- Damian Marley & Nas
- Flogging Molly
- Soulive
- The String Cheese Incident
- STS9
- Chromeo
- Lynx & Janover
- Girl Talk
- Lipp Service
- The Glitch Mob
- The Macpodz
- Tom Butwin Band

==== July 4 ====
- Ralph Stanley & The Clinch Mountain Boys
- Four Finger Five
- Giant Panda Guerilla Dub Squad
- Son Volt
- Jackie Greene
- Underground Orchestra
- Wendy Darling
- Hill Country Revue
- Railroad Earth
- John Butler
- Zappa Plays Zappa
- Les Claypool
- Reed Thomas Lawrence

The Black Crowes

- The Dead
- Umphrey's McGee
- MSTRKRFT
- Pretty Lights
- STS9 (Live PA Set)
- Shpongle DJ Set
- EOTO

==== July 5 ====
- The Ragbirds
- The Hard Lessons
- Peter Rowan Bluegrass Band with Tony Rice
- Toots and the Maytals
- Sam Roberts Band
- Guster
- Chris Pierce
- Yonder Mountain String Band
- Govt' Mule
- The Hold Steady
- Matisyahu
- The Parlor Mob
- Ani DiFranco
- Grace Potter and the Nocturnals
- Ralston Bowles – folk musician
- Bob Dylan & His Band
- Umphrey's McGee Nightcap
- Alex B (Pnuma Trio)
- Willie Nelson and Family
- Big Gigantic

== 2010 ==
According to an announcement made on Rothbury's official website on January 22, the festival would be "on hiatus" in 2010, but was expected to return in 2011.

== 2011 - Electric Forest begins ==
Electric Forest was co-founded by Pasquale Rotella, founder and CEO of Insomniac, and Madison House Presents' Jeremy Stein, CEO. It was not "Rothbury Festival", a trademarked name. A notable change was the lack of the main "Odium" stage. In its absence "The Ranch Arena" stage became the main stage. The area where the Odium had been was not accessible to festival attendees again until 2015. From June 30 to July 3, a new and different festival was held on the same festival grounds, the "Electric Forest Festival". From Electric Forest's inception in 2011 until 2016 The String Cheese Incident acted as the host band, performing three shows each year (more than any other performer).

=== Lineup ===
The lineup included

- The String Cheese Incident (three performances)
- Tiesto
- Bassnectar
- Pretty Lights
- Reo Speedwagon
- Edward Sharpe & the Magnetic Zeros
- Stephen Marley
- Kaskade
- Shpongle Presents the Shpongletron Experience
- Keller Williams
- Galactic
- Lotus
- Conspirator
- Railroad Earth
- JJ Grey & MOFRO
- Skrillex
- Excision
- The New Deal
- EOTO
- Emmitt-Nershi Band
- Karl Denson's Tiny Universe
- Kyle Hollingsworth Band
- Toubab Krewe
- Bonobo (DJ Set)
- Beats Antique
- Zach Deputy
- 12th Planet
- Big Gigantic
- Chiddy Bang
- Future Rock
- Eskmo
- Lettuce
- Eliot Lipp
- Paper Diamond
- The Infamous Stringdusters
- Zion I & The Grouch
- Greensky Bluegrass
- Feed Me
- Reverend Peyton's Big Damn Band
- Mat.McHugh (The Beautiful Girls) Solo & Acoustic
- Dieselboy
- The Pimps of Joytime
- Rubblebucket
- Papadosio
- Vibesquad
- Archnemesis
- Emancipator
- That 1 Guy
- Break Science
- Porter Robinson
- Two Fresh
- Keys n Krates
- Van Ghost
- The Ragbirds
- The Macpodz
- Euforquestra
- The Hood Internet
- Lance Herbstrong
- Cas Haley
- Lynx
- Zedd
- Michael Menert
- KRAZ (DJ Set)
- Janover
- The Treasures
- Steez
- The Werks
- Superdre
- Panic Bomber
- Dragon Wagon
- Cirque Du Womp

== 2012 ==
Electric Forest Festival returned to Rothbury from June 28 to July 1. Acts included

- The String Cheese Incident (three performances)
- Bassnectar
- STS9 (two performances)
- 12th Planet
- Adventure Club
- Afrolicious
- Alvin Risk
- Ataxia
- Attak & Karma
- Autoerotique
- Balkan Beat Box
- Big Freedia and the Divas
- Borgore
- Break Science ft. Chali 2na
- Brenton Duvall
- Brothers Past
- Cherub
- Chromatics
- Chuck Flask & Keith Kemp
- Congo Sanchez
- Crizzly
- Dada Life
- Das Racist
- Dixon's Violin
- DJ Solo
- DrFameus
- Dumptruck Butterlips
- Elephant Revival
- Eoto
- Felix Cartel
- Frank Mitchell Jr.
- Franki Chan
- Fruit Bats
- Gary Clark Jr.
- Glass Candy
- Gramatik
- GRiZ
- Hottub
- Human Agency
- Inspired Flight
- Ivan Neville's Dumpstaphunk
- Karl Denson's Tiny Universe
- Love in the Circus
- Midnite
- MiMosa
- Minnesota
- Nadis Warriors
- Nathaniel Rateliff
- Nickodemus
- Nit Grit
- Nobody Beats The Drum
- Novalima
- Papadosio
- Paper Diamond
- Paul Basic
- Pictureplane
- Pierce Fulton
- Prymativ
- R/D
- Raw Russ
- Reggie Watts
- Richie Hawtin
- Rob Garza (of Thievery Corporation)
- Secrets
- See-I
- Spektr
- The Coop
- The Crane Wives
- The Funk Ark
- The Infamous Stringdusters
- The Unsheathed
- Thunderball
- Tony Desaro
- Up Until Now
- Vau De Vire Society
- Virtual Boy
- Wala
- Wolfgang Gartner
- Wyllys
- Zoogma
- Thievery Corporation
- Girl Talk
- Santigold
- Steve Aoki
- Morning Teleportation
- Ghostland Observatory
- Richie Hawtin
- Major Lazer
- Big Gigantic
- The Travelin' McCourys featuring Keller Williams
- ESL Music
- Dim Mak

== 2013 ==
Electric Forest Festival returned to Rothbury in 2013 from June 27 through June 30.

=== Lineup ===
The initial lineup, announced on February 5, included:

- The String Cheese Incident (three shows)
- Pretty Lights
- Passion Pit
- Above & Beyond
- Empire of the Sun
- Knife Party
- Dispatch
- Lotus
- Benny Benassi
- Yeasayer
- Beats Antique
- GrizMatik
- Madeon
- A-Trak
- Morgan Page
- Tommy Trash
- Holy Ghost!
- Nervo
- EOTO
- Railroad Earth
- Headhunterz
- Trombone Shorty & Orleans Avenue
- Kill the Noise
- Emancipator
- Femi Kuti & The Positive Force
- Baauer
- Noisia
- Flosstradamus
- Michal Menert
- RL Grime
- SuckerPunch (ft. Marc Brownstein and Aron Magner of Disco Biscuits, Jamie Shields of The New Deal and Mike Greenfield of Lotus)
- Danny Brown
- Greensky Bluegrass
- Lettuce
- Break Science
- 3LAU
- Digital Tape Machine ft. Joel Cummins & Kris Myers of Umphrey's McGee
- The Polish Ambassador
- The Werks
- Treasure Fingers
- BoomBox
- Future Rock
- Le Castle Vania
- OLIVER
- Orchard Lounge
- Jeff Austin & Friends
- Eskmo
- Ana Sia
- Craze
- Pigs on the Wing (ft. David Murphy of STS9)
- Eliot Lipp
- Cyril Hahn
- Reptar
- Nick Catchdubs
- A Tribe Called Red
- No Regular Play
- The Pimps of Joytime
- Lance Herbstrong
- Clockwork
- Ryan Hemsworth
- Just Blaze
- Doldrums
- Keys N Krates
- Nigel Hall
- Nahko and Medicine for the People
- Quixotic
- Robert DeLong
- Lynx
- Delhi 2 Dublin
- Up Until Now
- Helicopter Showdown
- Russ Liquid
- Moon Hooch
- Dopapod
- Shreddie Mercury
- LowRIDERz
- Milkman
- The Main Squeeze
- Samo Sound Boy
- The Floozies
- Twiddle
- Mutrix
- Tumbleweed Wanderers
- DVBBS
- The Stepkids
- Beard-o-Bees
- Luke the Knife
- Manic Focus
- The Nth Power
- Party Supplies
- Rosin Coven
- Cosby Sweater (ft. Joel Cummins of Umphrey's McGee)
- Christian Rich
- Thriftworks
- Raw Russ
- Motion Potion
- Bestfriends
- Dustin Thomas
- The Fungineers
- Dixon's Violin
- Munson Meeks
- The Unsheathed
- Basscrooks
- Cello Joe
- Moonrise Nation
- robbieFITZSIMMONS
- Jessijem n' the Infamous Crotch Kickers
- Sam Klass
- Vokab Kompany
- Krewella

== 2014 ==
Electric Forest Festival was held on June 26–29, and sold out for the first time.

=== Lineup ===
The lineup included:

- The String Cheese Incident (3 shows)
- Steve Angello
- Umphrey's Mcgee (2 shows)
- STS9 (2 shows)
- Zedd
- Ms. Lauryn Hill
- Cut Copy
- Excision
- Flying Lotus
- Zeds Dead
- The Glitch Mob
- Matt & Kim
- Moby (DJ Set)
- Booka Shade
- Stephen Ragga Marley (ft. Ghetto Youths Crew)
- ScHoolboy Q
- EOTO
- Tycho
- Art Department
- Classixx
- Aloe Blacc
- Paper Diamond
- The Ms. Lauryn Hill Incident
- Anthony Hall
- 12th Planet
- After Funk
- Alex Metric
- Anders Osborne
- Andy C
- Andy Frasco & The U.N.
- Anna Lunoe
- Blue Sky Black Death
- Bob Moses
- Bombino
- Bro Safari
- Cash Cash
- Cashmere Cat
- Catz n Dogz
- Cherub
- Chrome Sparks
- Conspirator
- Cosby Sweater
- Dantiez Saunderson
- Dead Confederate
- Destructo
- Dirtyphonics
- Dixon's Violin
- Dusky
- Dustin Thomas
- Emancipator Ensemble
- Emerson Jay
- Earphunk
- Eric Volta
- Filibusta
- Francesca Lombardo
- Fury + MC Dino
- Gemini Club
- Golf Clap
- Graff
- GTA
- Hoop Troupe Showcase
- I Am Legion
- Isaac Tichauer
- J. Phlip
- Joe Hertler & The Rainbow Seekers
- Jon Wayne and The Pain
- Jonas Rathsman
- Jimmy Edgar
- Justin Martin
- K Theory
- Kastle
- Kaytranada
- Dantiez Saunderson B2B Kevin Saunderson
- Kung Fu
- Kygo
- Late Night Radio
- Lee Burridge
- Lindsay Lowend
- Los Rakas
- Luke The Knife
- Luminox
- MK
- Manic Menert (Manic Focus x Michal Menert)
- Marcelo Moxy
- Moon Boots
- Moon Taxi
- Nahko and Medicine for the People
- Nahko Bear (Solo)
- Natasha Kmeto
- Papadosio
- Pegboard Nerds
- Penguin Prison DJ Set
- Perseus
- Poolside
- Protohype
- RAC
- Rayland Baxter
- Rising Appalachia
- Roadkill Ghost Choir
- Robbie Fitzsimmons
- Rosin Coven
- Ryan Viser
- S/HE
- Seven Lions
- Sister Sparrow & the Dirty Birds
- Soul Clap
- Soul Visions (members of Rising Appalachia & The Human Experience)
- St. Lucia
- T. Hardy Morris
- The Floozies
- The Fungineers
- The Revivalists
- The UNSHEATHED!
- Topher Jones
- Trippy Turtle
- Until The Ribbon Breaks
- What So Not
- Wilkinson
- Woven Tangles
- Xavier Rudd
- Zoogma

== 2015 ==
Electric Forest Festival was held on June 25–28, 2015.

Lineup

The lineup headliners included:

- Dubfire
- Keller Williams' Grateful Grass
- Leikeli47
- Chaz French
- Adam Deitch (DJ set)
- Dabin
- The String Cheese Incident (3 shows)
- Dixon's Violin (4 shows)
- Bassnectar
- Skrillex
- Kaskade
- Flume
- Big Gigantic
- Break Science
- Carl Cox
- Carnage
- Claude VonStroke
- Datsik
- Edward Sharpe and the Magnetic Zeros
- Electron
- EOTO
- Flux Pavilion
- G-Eazy
- Galactic with Macy Gray
- Gramatik
- Green Velvet
- Joe Russo's Almost Dead
- John Digweed
- Lettuce
- Lindsey Stirling
- Lotus
- Odesza
- Paul Oakenfold
- Phantogram
- Seun Kuti
- Shpongle (DJ Set)
- Tchami (Removed in Phase 2)
- The Motet
- Yonder Mountain String Band
- Alison Wonderland
- American Babies
- Black Tiger Sex Machine
- Borgeous
- Branx
- Charles Bradley and His Extraordinaires
- Crizzly
- Delta Spirit
- Dopapod
- Ed Rush & Optical
- Everyone Orchestra
- ExMag
- Freddy Todd
- Funk Hunters feat. Chali 2na
- GeoVybe
- Gibbz
- Goldfish
- GoldLink
- Goldroom
- Haywyre
- Illenium
- JackLNDN
- Jaga Jazzist
- Jakubi
- Joseph
- KOAN Sound
- Lafa Taylor
- Life on Planets
- Little People
- Made In Heights
- Mako
- MartyParty
- Matoma
- Miami Horror
- Midnight Magic
- Mike Love
- Minnesota
- MJ Cole
- MOPO
- Mt Eden
- Nadus
- Nattali Rize & Notis
- Nick Monaco
- Pan Astral
- Peking Duk
- Peoples Blues of Richmond
- Pete Tong
- Phutureprimitave
- Preservation Hall Jazz Band
- Russ Liquid
- Sango
- Skylar Spence
- Slow Hands
- Slow Magic
- Snails
- SNBRN
- Son of Kick
- Soul Clap
- Superhuman Happiness
- TAUK
- TEEMID
- Teengirl Fantasy
- The Accidentals
- The Ragbirds
- The Werks
- Trevor Hall
- U9Lift
- Vaski
- Wave Racer
- Wiwek
- Wolf + Lamb
- Yojimbo

== 2016 ==
Electric Forest Festival was held on June 23–26, 2016.

=== Lineup ===
The lineup headliners included:

- The String Cheese Incident (three shows)
- Bassnectar
- Adventure Club
- Baauer
- Beats Antique
- Bonobo (DJ set)
- Duke Dumont
- Flosstradamus
- Gorgon City (live)
- Greensky Bluegrass
- GRiZ
- Nahko and Medicine for the People
- Porter Robinson (live)
- STS9
- Tchami
- The Disco Biscuits
- Frameworks
- Fury + MC Dino
- Future Rock
- G Jones
- Gallant
- Grandtheft
- Louis the Child
- Low Steppa
- MAGIC GIANT
- Manic Focus
- Marian Hill
- Mark Farina
- Metrik
- Mija
- Mike Dunn
- Miner
- Motez (producer)
- Motion Potion
- Navid Izadi
- The New Mastersounds
- The Nth Power
- The Polish Ambassador
- The Soul Rebels featuring Talib Kweli and GZA (replaced Fetty Wap)
- The Suffers
- Way Out West
- What So Not
- Whilk & Misky
- 12th Planet
- AC Slater
- Alina Baraz
- Alunageorge
- Anna Lunoe
- Aqueous
- Atlas Road Crew
- Austin Plaine
- Bleep Bloop
- Brillz
- Bro Safari
- Broccoli Samurai
- Calliope Musicals
- Carly Bins
- Caspa b2b Rusko
- Flava D
- Gryffin
- Hayden James
- Hermitude
- Hippie Sabotage
- Houndmouth
- Landis Lapace
- Lane 8
- Lany
- Le Youth
- Los Colognes
- Neon Indian
- New Beat Fund
- NGHTMRE
- Nick Monaco Live
- Ott & The All-Seeing
- Papadosio
- Paper Diamond
- Party Favor
- TC
- Teddy Killerz
- Tei Shi
- Tennyson
- The Bright Light Social Hour
- The Disco Biscuits
- The Floozies
- Yotto
- Will Clarke
- Major Lazer
- Chris Lorenzo
- Coleman Hell
- Cubicolor
- Delhi 2 Dublin (DJ set)
- Dixon's Violin
- DJ Jazzy Jeff
- DJ Mustard
- DJ Soul Sister
- Doomtree
- Dumpstaphunk
- Dusky
- Earphunk
- Egyptian Lover
- EOTO
- Eprom
- Evaoff
- Jackal
- Jillionaire
- Josh Wink
- Just Kiddin
- Justin Martin
- Kamasi Washington
- Karl Denson's Tiny Universe
- Keys N Krates
- Kry Wolf
- Lance Herbstrong
- Petey Clicks
- Preservation Hall Jazz Band
- Raury
- Rufus Du Sol
- Savory
- Scott Grooves
- Skratch Bastid
- Slander
- Slumberjack
- Son Little
- Soul Clap
- Stephen
- Stick Figure
- SunSquabi
- Taiki Nulight

== 2017 ==
For the first time, the Electric Forest Festival was held on two weekends: June 22–25 and June 29 – July 2, 2017.

=== Lineup ===
The lineup for both weekends included:

- 12th Planet
- Andy Hall
- A-Trak
- Autograf
- Bassnectar
- Big Gigantic
- Big Wild
- Bill Nershi & Keith Moseley
- Bluegrass Generals
- Bob Moses
- Brazilian Girls
- Breakbot
- CBDB
- Chris Lake
- Claude VonStroke
- Cobi
- Con Brio
- Consider the Source
- Crywolf
- Dillon Francis
- Dirty Audio
- Dixon's Violin
- DJ EZ
- Echos
- Ekali
- EOTO
- Fakear
- FKJ
- Francis and the Lights
- Ganja White Night
- Giraffage
- Golf Clap
- Haywyre
- Honey LaRochelle
- Illenium
- Jai Wolf
- Joe Hertler & The Rainbow Seekers
- Khruangbin
- Lettuce
- Lotus
- Lynx & The Servants of Song
- Machinedrum
- Matisyahu
- Matoma
- Minnesota
- Nombre
- Opiuo
- Papadosio
- Pham
- PhuturePrimitive
- Pigeons Playing Ping Pong
- Protoje
- Rezz
- Saint Wknd
- Sepiatonic
- Shaed
- Snakehips
- SNBRN
- Southern Avenue
- Spafford
- StéLouse
- Tauk
- The Accidentals
- The Floozies
- The Hip Abduction
- The Infamous Stringdusters
- The London Souls
- The Motet
- The Revivalists
- The String Cheese Incident
- TheFatRat
- Thriftworks
- Tom Misch (DJ Set)
- Trevor Hall
- Two Friends
- Vince Staples
- Vourteque
- Waka Flocka Flame
- Wave Racer
- Whethan
- Win and Woo
- Woolymammoth

==== Artists appearing in Weekend 1 only ====
- Above & Beyond
- AC Slater
- Andy C
- Ardalan
- Asadi
- Banks
- Bot
- Breaking Biscuits
- Carmada
- Chet Porter
- Choir!Choir!Choir!
- Corbu
- Crizzly
- Dimond Saints
- Donny McCaslin
- Eden
- Eptic
- Eric Krasno Band
- Everyone Orchestra
- Fury + MC Dino
- Her
- Jack Beats
- Jacob Banks
- Jimmy Edgar
- Kaiydo
- Kamasi Washington
- Liquid Stranger
- Maya Jane Coles
- My Morning Jacket
- Nero (Live)
- ODESZA
- Oliver Heldens
- Ott
- Pendulum DJ Set
- Pluto
- Redlight
- Shift K3Y
- Sinden
- Sonny Fodera
- Space Jesus
- Thunderthief
- Tortuga
- Trampa
- Troyboi
- Tycho
- Viceroy
- Walker & Royce
- Wingtip
- Xenia Rubinos
- Zomboy

==== Artists appearing in Weekend 2 only ====
- Afsheen
- Alison Wonderland
- Alix Perez
- Beans on Toast
- Black Tiger Sex Machine
- BlackGummy
- Break Science
- Brohug
- Cashmere Cat
- Castmusic
- Conspirator
- Croatia Squad
- Darnell Williams
- Delta Heavy
- DJ Snake
- Dr. Fresch
- EDX
- EPROM
- Eryn Allen Kane
- Flint Eastwood
- Flume
- FuntCase
- Gentelmen Callers of LA
- GTA
- Hi-Lo
- Jon Wayne and The Pain
- Kalya Scintilla & Eve Olution
- Kyle Hollingsworth Band
- L D R U
- Lido
- Merkaba
- Mick Jenkins
- Nahko and Medicine for the People
- Nick Monaco
- No Regular Play
- Nora En Pure
- Oddisee & Good Company
- Ott & The All-Seeing I
- Pillowtalk
- Preservation Hall Jazz Band
- River Tiber
- RL Grime
- Roman Flügel
- Shiba San
- Soul Clap
- Sub Focus
- Taylor Bennett
- Team EZY
- The Golden Pony
- The Movement
- The Skins
- The Upbeats
- Theti
- Thievery Corporation
- Tor
- Touch Sensitive
- Valentino Khan
- Watermät
- Wax Motif
- Wolf + Lamb
- Xyl0
- Yahtzel
- Zeke Beats

== 2018 ==
In 2018, Electric Forest took place across two weekends: June 21–24 and June 28 – July 1.

=== Lineup ===
The lineup for both weekends included:

- !!!
- A Tribe Called Red
- Aidan Sokol
- Air Credits
- Alluxe
- Andy Frasco & The UN
- Andy P
- Anna Lunoe
- Attlas
- Aqueous
- Bassnectar
- Beau Young Prince
- Betty Who
- Big Something
- Bishop Briggs
- Boogie T
- Boogie T.rio (live band)
- Boombox Cartel
- Bonobo Live Band
- Buku
- Camelphat
- Calyx &Teebee
- Cassian
- Chalk Dinosaur
- Charlesthefirst
- Cherub
- Chris Lake
- Chromeo
- Clapback
- Claptone
- Clozee
- Codes
- Cookie Monsta
- Corrupt
- Cory Henry & The Funk Apostles
- Crankdat
- Cut Chemist
- Cut Copy
- Cut Snake
- Daily Bread
- Daktyl
- Day Cart & Wig-Wam
- Dena Amy
- Desert Dwellers
- Detlef
- Devin The Dude
- Dimension
- Dixon's Violin
- Doc Martin
- Droeloe
- Dub Trio
- Dynohunter
- Elderbrook
- Elohim
- Emancipator Ensemble
- Eoto
- Eprom
- Everyone Orchestra
- Falcons
- Fisher
- Flamingosis
- Floating Points (solo live)
- Fort Knox Five
- Fruition
- Fury + MC Dino
- Galantis
- Get Real
- G Jones
- Golf Clap
- Goodsex
- Great Good Fine OK
- Green Velvet
- GRiZ Live Band
- Gryffin
- Hayden James
- Herobust
- His Golden Messenger
- Hotel Garuda
- HRZSOGOOD
- Huxley
- Insightful
- Iris
- Jade Cicada
- Jauz
- Jeremy Olander
- Jody Litvack
- Justin Jay's Fantastic Voyage
- Karl Denson's Tiny Universe
- Kasbo
- Kawehi
- Kayzo
- Keith Mackenzie
- Kerri Chandler
- Keys N Krates
- Kidswaste
- Kill Frenzy
- K+Lab
- Knox Fortune
- Krane
- Kronica
- Kyle Watson
- Lane 8
- Lawrence
- Lee Reynolds
- Locos Por Juana
- Louis The Child
- Loudpvck
- Lophile
- Luzcid
- Lyfted
- Madame Gandhi
- Maddy O'Neal
- Magic City Hippies
- Malaa
- Manic Focus
- Manila Killa
- Mansion
- Marbs
- Marian Hill
- Marshmello
- Marvel Years
- Masi
- Matisyahu
- Mat.joe
- Matrix & Futurebound
- MAX
- Maximono
- Medasin
- Melvv
- Mersiv
- Michigan Rattlers
- Mija
- Mike Love
- Mikey Lion
- Mikey Pauker
- Misterwives
- MK
- Moody Good
- Motez
- Motion Potion
- Mount Kimbie
- Mr. Carmack
- Mt. Joy
- Muzzy Bear
- Natalie Cressman
- Netsky (DJ Set)
- Nicole Moudaber
- Noisia
- Noname
- Omnom
- Ossian
- Party Favor
- Party Pupils
- Pat Lok
- Pendulum People
- Penguin Prison
- Phantoms
- Pho
- Poolside
- Porkchop
- Probcause
- Psyntimental
- Quix
- Rayana Jay
- Rezz
- Rinzen
- Rybo
- San Holo
- Sam Gellaitry
- Sasha Marie
- Savior Adore
- Sepiatonic
- Seth Troxler
- Shallou
- Shook Twins
- Sinkane
- Slynk
- Sodown
- Space Jesus
- Spag Heddy
- Squnto
- Star Kitchen Ft Marc Brownstein
- Stickybuds
- Subfer
- Sunsquabi
- Superduperkyle
- Super Future
- Super Tall Paul
- Supernatural Beings Ft. Joel Cummings, Chris Meyer, Marcus Rezak, Hash Vyas
- Test Pilot
- Tennis Jacket Ft Marc Brownstein and Jeremy Salken
- The Comet is Coming
- The Dip
- The Glitch Mob
- The Main Squeeze
- The Nth Power
- The Russ Liquid Test
- The Werks
- The Whooligan
- Thundercat
- Too Many Zooz
- Tortuga
- Totally Enormous Extinct Dinosaurs (DJ Set)
- Toubab Krewe
- Tsuruda
- Turkuaz
- Two Feet
- um..
- Vourteque
- Waker
- Washed Out
- William Black
- Wylie
- Xavier Rudd
- Xiuhtezcatl
- XLP
- Xonic
- Ye. (DJ)
- Zeshan B
- Zhu
- Zimbu

== 2019 ==
In 2019, Electric Forest reverted to a single weekend festival, and was held June 27–30, 2019.

=== Lineup ===
The lineup for 2019 included:

- 12th Planet
- Aaron Hale
- Adam Frek
- Aidan Sokol
- Aima the Dreamer & Erica Dee
- Alex Kislov
- Alfiya Glow
- Alison Wonderland
- Ambar Lucid
- Amtrac
- Andrea Gibson
- Andy P
- Anomalie
- Arvi Malaa
- Ayla Nereo
- Ayokay
- BadKlaat
- Bassnectar
- BAYNK
- Balkan Bump
- Ben Spellman - Yoga
- Black Tiger Sex Machine
- Bob Moses
- Boombox
- Born Dirty
- Brandon "TAZ' Niederauer
- Brownie (DJ Set)
- CVBZ
- Cas Haley
- Caspa
- Cautious Clay
- Cello Joe
- CharlesTheFirst
- Chase Makai
- Chon
- Claude Von Stroke
- ClockworkDJ
- Comisar
- Cosmo's Midnight
- Crooked Colours
- Cuco
- DAYA
- DC Breaks
- DJ Mancub
- DJ PZB
- DJ Tsunami
- Dantes Sinferno / Rose City Circus
- Datura
- Day Cart & Wig-Wam
- Defunk
- Desmond Jones
- Digital Ethos
- Chee
- Dixon's Violin
- Doom Flamingo
- Dorfex Bos
- Dozier
- Dr. Fresch
- Dragondeer
- Dried Spider
- EOTO
- The Nth Power Presents: Earth, Wind & Power
- Ekali
- El Papachango & Dakini Star
- Eli Brown
- Escapade (Walker & Royce + Ardalan)
- Escort
- Exmag
- FM-84
- FunkStatik
- Funster
- Fury + MC Dino
- Ganja White Night
- Ghost Light
- Ghost-Note
- Golf Clap
- GoodSex
- Goon Room Takeover
- Gorgon City (live)
- Govinda
- Gramatik
- Grateful Shred
- Haleigh Haus
- Halfnoise
- Handmade Moments
- Hannah Muse
- Hannah Wants
- Henry Ammar
- Hippie Sabotage
- Hollywood Honey
- Homage
- Homemade Spaceship
- Honey Dijon
- Honeycomb
- Horse Meat Disco
- Horseshoes & Hand Grenades
- ILO ILO
- Ivy Lab
- JAENGA
- JASON HANN
- Jantsen
- Jayda G
- Jellybean Benitez
- Joe Hertler & The Rainbow Seekers
- Joel Cummins
- John Craigie
- KNOWER
- Keith MacKenzie
- Kid Quill
- King Henry
- Krushendo
- Kruza Kid
- Kygo
- LICK
- LITZ
- Lee Fields & The Expressions
- Lettuce
- Lightship Beatbox
- Little Simz
- Loadstar
- Lolo Zouai
- Louis The Child
- Lucid Vision
- Luttrell
- Lynx
- M.O.B
- MEMBA
- MIDIcinal
- Manatee Commune
- Mansionair
- Marc Brownstein
- Mason Maynard
- Micah J
- Mihali (solo)
- Mile High Sound Movement Takeover
- Minnesota
- Motion Potion
- Mungion
- NGHTMRE & SLANDER PRESENT: GUD VIBRATIONS
- Niles Shepard
- OMNOM
- Octo Octa
- Odesza
- Ookay (live)
- Opiuo
- Orchard Lounge
- PLS&TY
- Pigeons Playing Ping Pong
- Pnuma (live)
- Project Aspect
- Quinn XCII
- Random Rab
- Red Giant Project
- Riot Ten
- Ripe
- Robotaki
- Ryan Mahrer
- SHAED
- SNBRN
- SORNE
- STS9
- SUPER DUPER
- Saba
- Sacha Robotti
- Said the Sky (live)
- Sam White
- Seven Lions
- Snails
- Sophistafunk
- Southern Avenue
- Spafford
- Spaga Trio
- Steve Poltz (solo)
- Subtronics
- SuperTallPaul
- Sweet Crude
- T-Pain
- TOKiMONSTA
- Tauk
- The Floozies
- The Funk Hunters
- The Knocks
- The Librarian
- The Midnight
- The Polish Ambassador
- The String Cheese Incident
- Thriftworks
- Thumpasaurus
- Tierra Whack
- TruFeelz
- Twiddle
- Unlimited Gravity
- Vourteque
- WHITE OWL
- Wooli
- Wavedash
- Whethan
- Whipped Cream
- Wildlight
- Woke Zan
- Wuki
- XONIC
- YAKO
- Yotto
- Yung Bae
- Zeds Dead
- Ziggy Alberts

== 2020 ==
Due to the COVID-19 pandemic, in the spring of 2020, Electric Forest considered rescheduling the event for September 2020. The Rothbury Village Council voted to reject the proposed postponement, leading to the complete cancellation of Electric Forest 2020, which would instead return in the summer of 2022.

== 2022 ==
In 2022, Electric Forest returned after a two-year hiatus, due to the COVID-19 pandemic. The festival took place June 23–26, 2022 in Rothbury, Michigan.

=== Lineup ===
- BEA Miller
- Big Wild
- Charlesthefirst
- Chelsea Cutler
- Clozee
- Dom Dolla
- Duke Dumont
- Disclosure
- Earthgang
- Elderbrook
- Femi Kuti
- GRiZ
- John Summit
- Lettuce
- Liquid Stranger
- Lotus
- Lsdream
- Markus Schulz
- Shiba San
- SidePiece
- So Tuff So Cute
- Subtronics
- TOKiMONSTA
- Toro y Moi
- Wax Motif
- Whethan
- Yung Bae
- Yves Tumor
- A Hundred Drums
- Alice Ivy
- Anamanaguchi
- Andrew Bayer
- Blu DeTiger
- Brandon "TAZ" Niederauer
- Bryce Menchaca
- Cannons
- Cassian
- Cautious Clay
- The Cheeks
- Cloonee
- Cory Henry
- Cory Wong
- Deathpact
- Dixons Violin
- DJ_Dave
- Doss
- Drama
- Duckwrth
- Eden Prince
- Eli & Fur
- Ethno
- EVAN GIIA
- Everyone Orchestra
- Exes
- Fantastic Negrito
- Felly
- Flamingosis
- Franc Moody
- Fundido
- Gioli & Assia
- Giorgia Angiuli
- Goth Babe
- Honeycomb
- Honeyluv
- Iya Terra
- Jake Wesley Rogers
- Jerro
- Joe Hertler & The Rainbow Seekers
- Joy Oladokun
- Kareem Ali
- Khiva
- Kitchen Dwellers
- Kito
- Lab Group
- LP Giobbi
- Marc E. Bassy
- Marco Benevento
- Max
- Mersiv
- Michigander
- Mindchatter
- Mo Lowda & The Humble
- Moore Kismet
- Neil Frances
- Nez
- Noga Erez
- Notlo
- The NTH Power
- Of the Trees
- Olan
- Louis the Child
- Party Pupils
- Porter Robinson
- Potions
- Qrtr
- Rome in Silver
- Sebastian Paul
- Slenderbodies
- Sohmi
- Star Kitchen
- Sunsquabi
- Supertask
- Surf Mesa
- Tinlicker
- Township Rebellion
- Tsuruda
- Underscores
- Uniiqu3
- Vnssa
- Weval
- Wreckno
- Wuki

== 2023 ==
In 2023, the festival took place June 22–25, 2023 in Rothbury, Michigan. The first wave of artists was announced in December 2022 followed by an additional wave in March 2023.

=== Headliners ===
- Odesza
- Jamie XX
- Sofi Tukker
- Gorgon City
- Illenium
- Gryffin
- Lane 8
- Ganja White Night
- Fletcher
- The String Cheese Incident (2 incidents)
- Zeds Dead
- Chris Lake
- STS9
- Chromeo
- Above & Beyond
- Rezz
- Goose
- Madeon

=== Additional artists (alphabetized, second tier) ===
- 070 Shake
- BLOND:ISH
- Bob Moses (club set)
- Channel Tres
- Chris Lorenzo
- Cosmic Gate
- Dabin
- Diesel
- Emotional Oranges
- Gashi
- Golden Features
- Hayden James
- Infected Mushroom
- ISOxo
- Kai Wachi
- Kerala Dust
- Opiuo
- Peekaboo
- Rusko B2B Dirt Monkey
- Sad Night Dynamite
- San Holo
- SG Lewis
- SVDDEN DEATH presents: VOYD
- Totally Enormous Extinct Dinosaurs
- Two Feet
- Virtual Riot
- Walker & Royce

=== Additional artists (alphabetized, third tier) ===
- Aluna
- Amémé
- Apashe (live brass ensemble)
- Austin Mills
- Azzecca
- Black Carl!
- Bontan
- Champagne Drip
- Cid
- Cimafunk
- Coco and Clair Clair
- Daily Bread
- Daniel Allan
- Danielle Ponder
- Devault
- Disco Lines
- Dixon’s Violin
- DJ Brownie
- dj topgun
- Dogs in a Pile
- Dr. Fresch
- Eazybaked
- Elohim
- flipturn
- Ford.
- Forester
- Freddy Todd
- HUGEL
- J. Worra
- Jantsen
- Jellybean Benitez
- Jupiter & Okwess
- Kainalu
- Kasablanca
- Kasbo
- Lee Foss
- Malón
- Memba
- Miane
- Mobley
- N3ptune + Rusty Steve
- Neighbor
- Noizu
- Pawpaw Rod
- Phantoms
- Politik
- Raecola
- Rohann
- Rossy
- Saka
- Satin Jackets
- Snakes and Stars
- Space Wizard
- Tabe B
- Thumpasaurus
- Tkay Maidza
- Truth
- Very Nice Person
- Yunè Pinku
- Zingara
- Plus the Silent Disco, Curated Events, Daily Yoga, and more

== 2024 ==
The 12th Electric Forest Festival was scheduled to take place June 20–23, 2024. The first wave of artists was announced on December 5, 2023, with an additional wave expected to follow in the spring. Loyalty tickets went on sale beginning on December 4, 2023, with tickets for the general public going on sale on December 8, 2023.

=== Headliners ===
- Everything Always (Dom Dolla + John Summit)
- Nelly Furtado
- The Disco Biscuits
- Ben Böhmer
- Knock2
- Pretty Lights
- Ludacris
- Black Tiger Sex Machine
- The String Cheese Incident (2 inciddents)
- Subtronics
- John Summit
- LSZEE (Clozee + LSDREAM)
- Excision
- Charlotte de Witte
- Gigantic NGHTMRE
- Umphrey's McGee

=== Additional artists (alphabetized, second tier so far) ===
- Atliens
- Barclay Crenshaw
- Brass Alarms FB
- Cannons
- Chase & Status
- Cuco (DJ set)
- Dimension
- Drama
- G Jones
- Green Velvet
- Kenny Beats
- Lettuce
- Libianca
- LP Giobbi
- Matroda
- Mau P
- Neil Frances
- Rawayana
- Vini Vici
- Whyte Fang
- Wooli

=== Additional artists (alphabetized, third tier so far) ===
- Acraze
- Alleycvt
- Ayybo
- Calussa
- Caspa
- Cassian
- Coco & Breezy
- Dirtwire
- Dixon's Violin
- DJ Tennis
- Dumpstaphunk
- Eggy
- Hamdi
- INZO
- It's Murph
- Juelz
- Le Youth
- Level Up
- Luci
- Lyny
- Maddy O'Neal
- Major League DJz
- Mascolo
- Michaël Brun
- Oden & Fatzo
- Paperwater
- Peach Tree Rascals
- Ranger Trucco
- Sammy Virji
- Slayyyter
- Sultan + Shepard
- Tsha
- Venbee
- Vnssa B2B Nala
- Westend
- Will Clarke
- Plus: Curated events, the silent disco, daily yoga, and much more

== See also ==
- List of electronic music festivals
- List of jam band music festivals
