= Slow Disco =

Slow Disco may refer to:

- "Slow Disco" (song) on the Masseduction album
- Silent disco
