= Mopo =

Mopo may refer to:

- Hamburger Morgenpost, a German newspaper
- Maury Povich (born 1939), an American television host
- Motion Potion (Robbie Kowal, born 1973), American musician
