= 2010 Bonnaroo Music Festival =

The 2010 Bonnaroo Music and Arts Festival was held on June 10–13, 2010. The line-up was announced Tuesday, February 9, although the original line-up release date was scheduled for February 2. It was broadcast live on YouTube. Pre-sale tickets went on sale November 27, 2009.

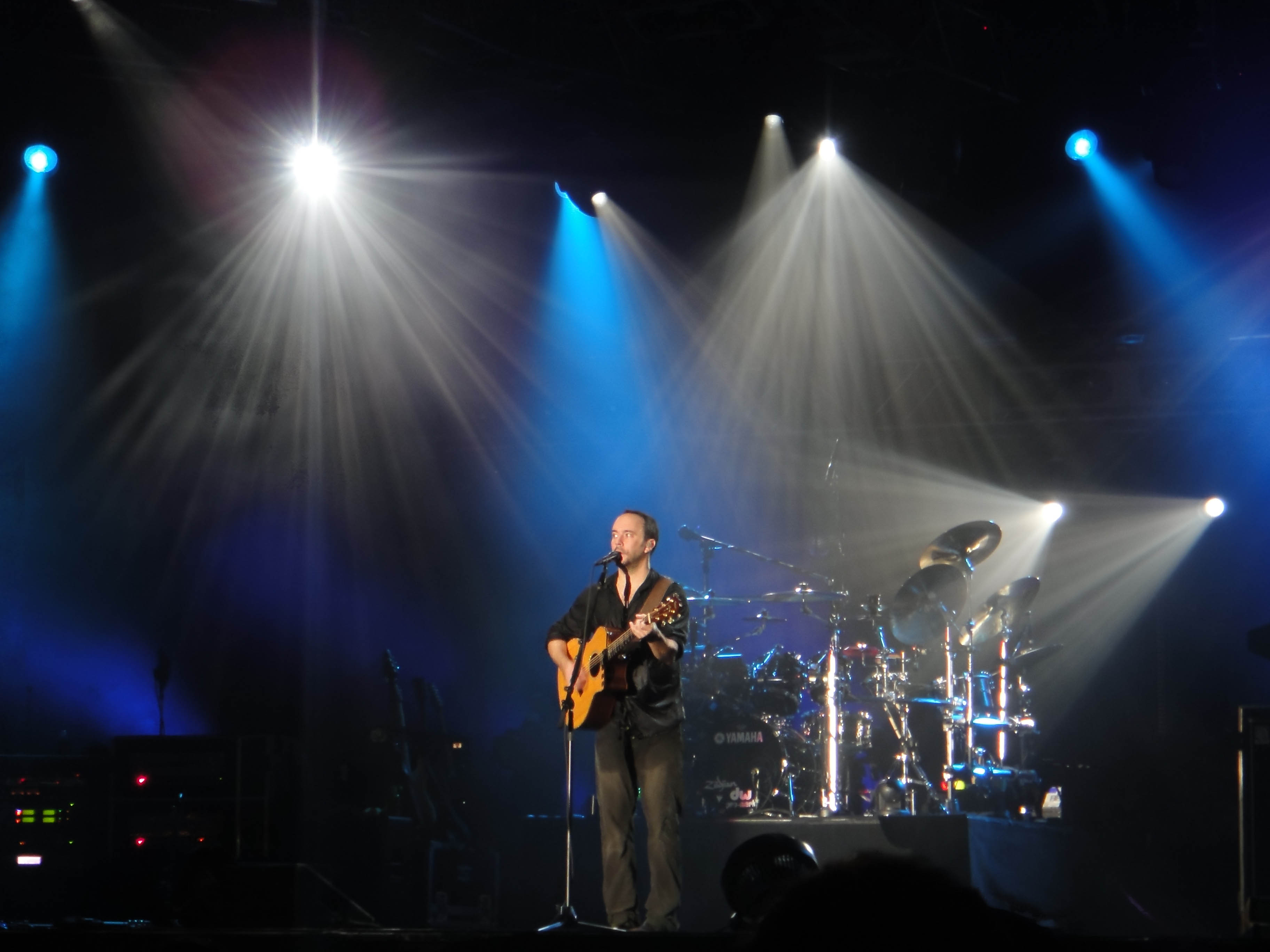
Dave Matthews Band was the closing headliner at Bonnaroo 2010

== Line-up ==
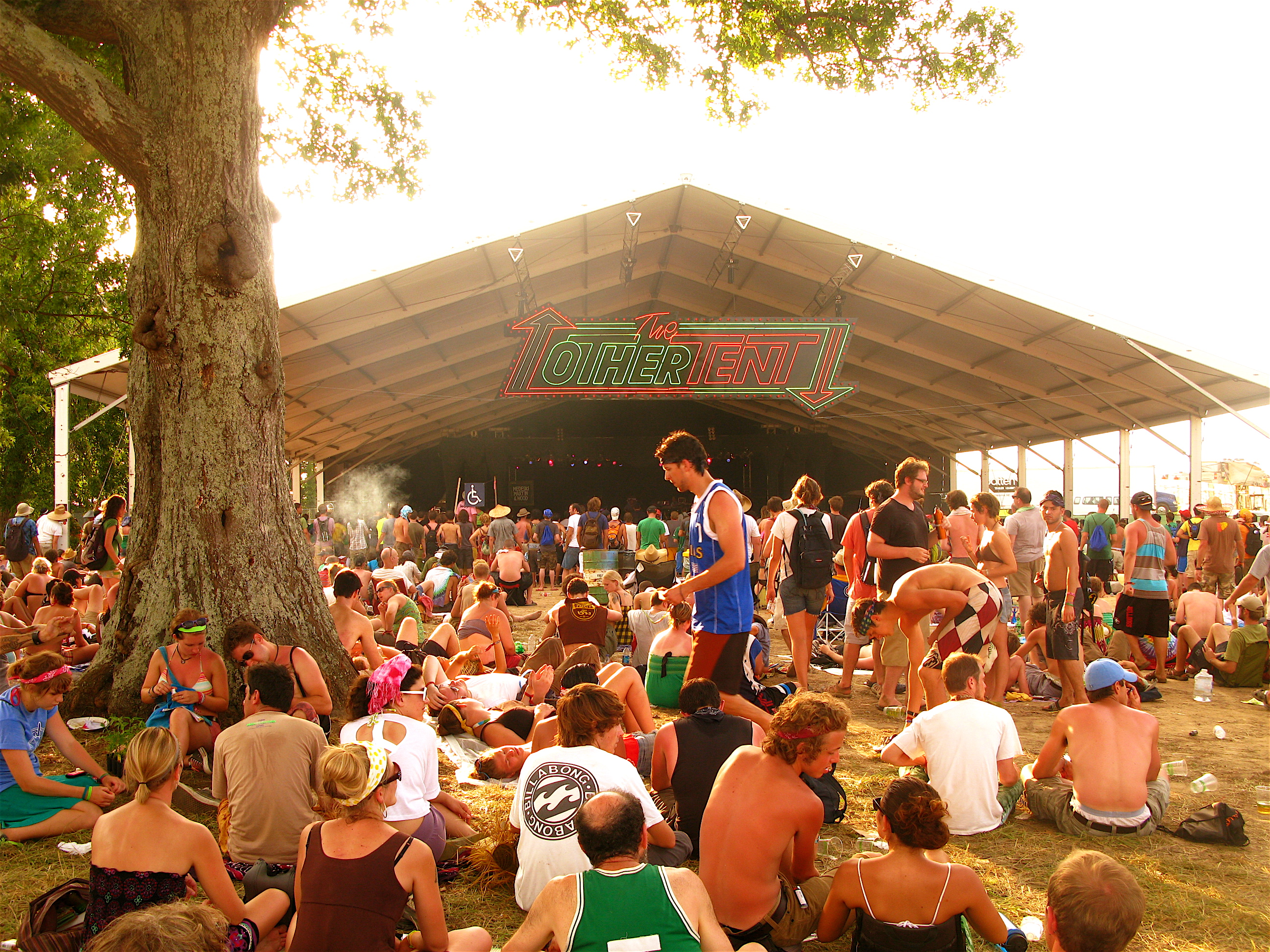
The Other Tent

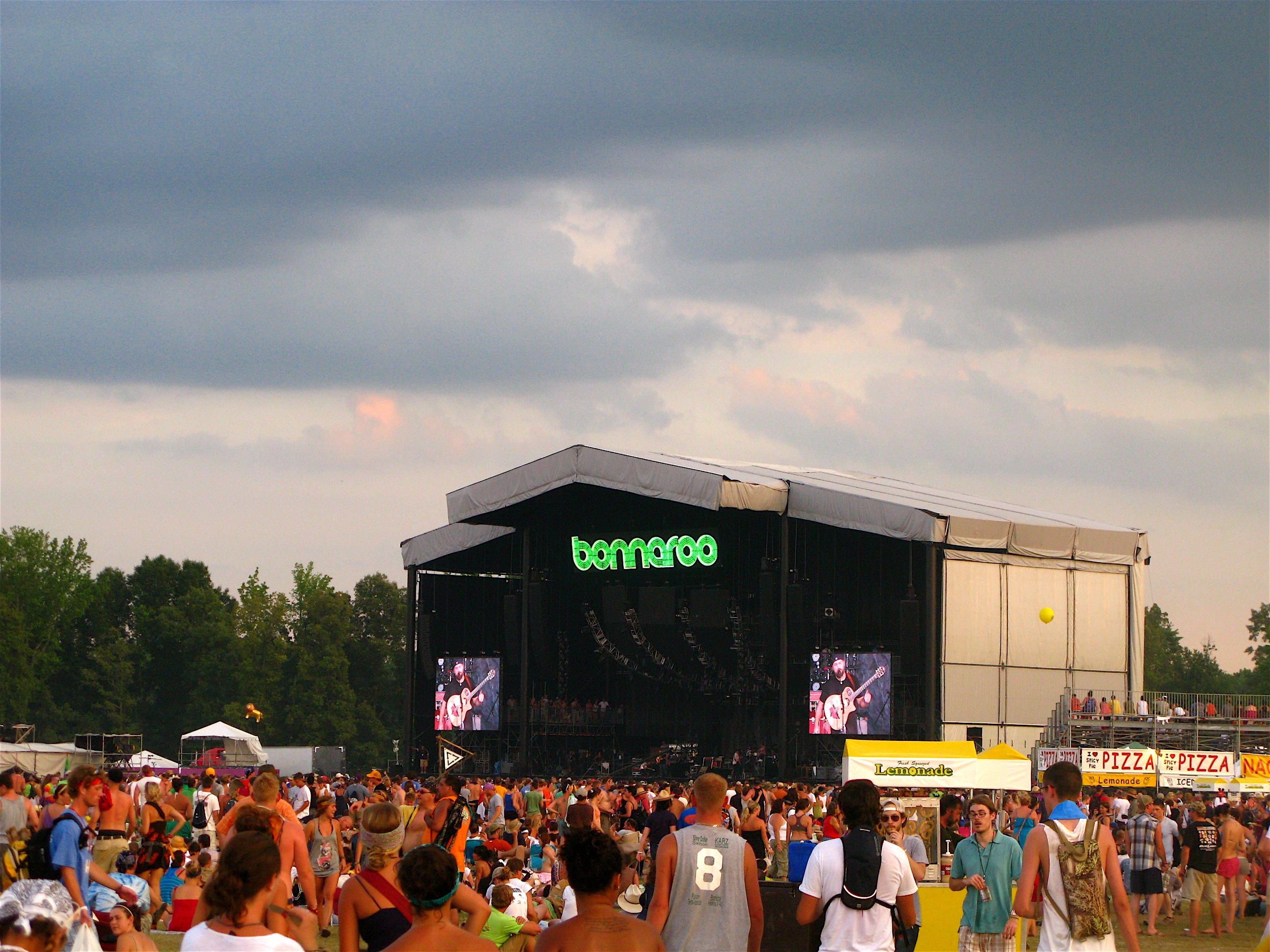
What Stage

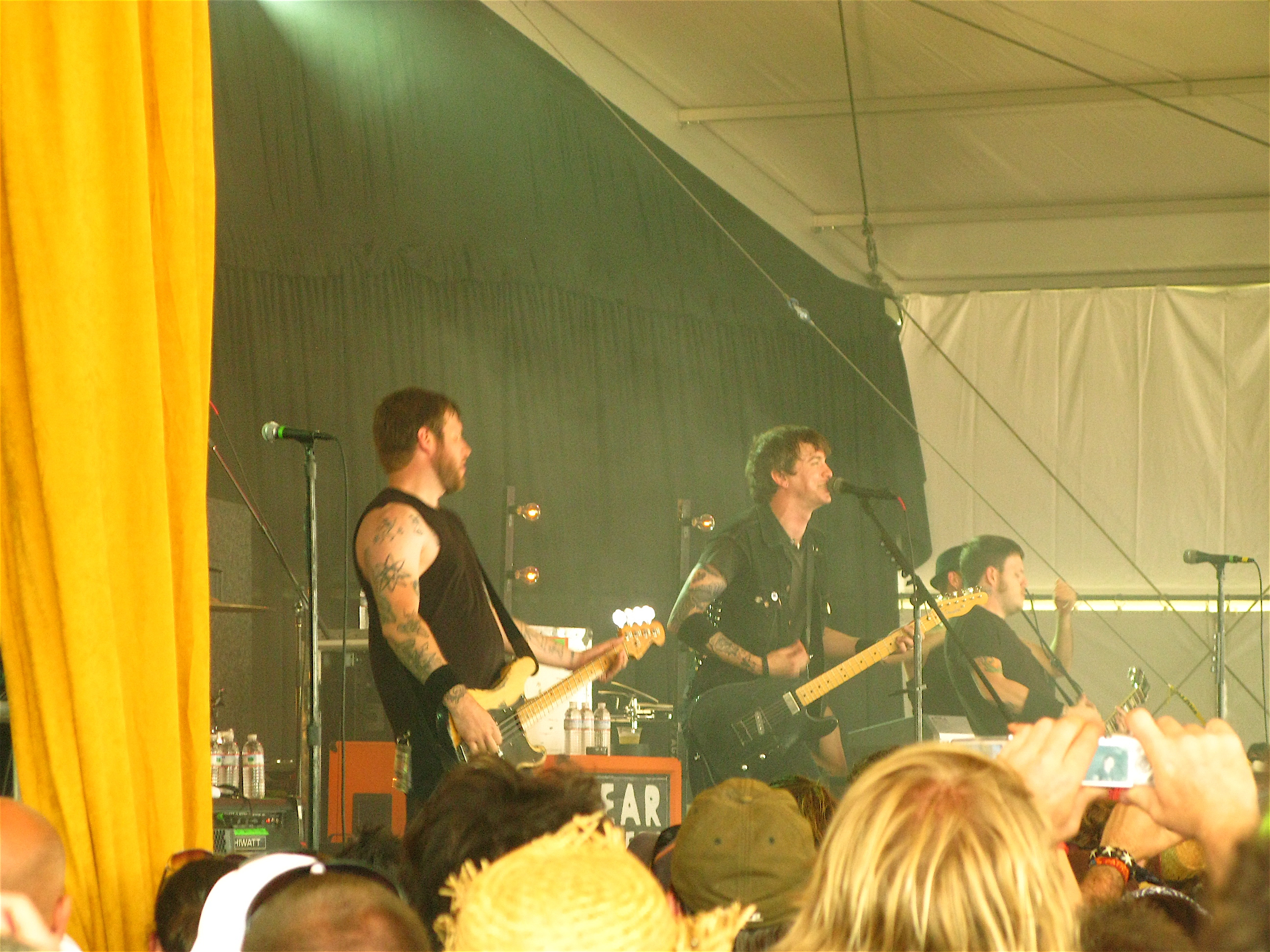
Against Me! performing

The majority of artists were announced on Bonnaroo's official MySpace and Twitter pages over a span of nine hours. On March 4, Ween, John Butler Trio, Umphrey's McGee, Galactic, The Gossip, and Circa Survive were added to the line-up. On March 11, it was announced that Conan O'Brien would stop at the festival during The Legally Prohibited from Being Funny on Television Tour. Recordings of Tenacious D's performance on June 11 were released for free on the Live Music Archive.

=== Thursday, June 10 ===
(artists listed from earliest to latest set times)

- This Tent:
  - The Entrance Band
  - Here We Go Magic
  - Miike Snow
  - The Dodos
  - Mayer Hawthorne and the County
  - Wale
- That Tent:
  - The Postelles
  - Diane Birch
  - Local Natives
  - Neon Indian
  - The Temper Trap
  - The xx
- The Other Tent:
  - Fanfarlo
  - Baroness
  - Manchester Orchestra
  - Needtobreathe
  - Blitzen Trapper
  - Lotus
- The Comedy Theatre:
  - J. B. Smoove with Julian McCullough & Rob Cantrell (2 Sets)
  - Margaret Cho with Baron Vaughn & John Roberts (2 Sets)
- Cinema Tent:
  - Short Circuit
  - Corey Haim Rules: The Lost Boys
  - Green Screens presented by Rock the Earth: Gasland / The World Ocean: Trashed
  - Countdown to Zero
  - Adult Swim's Aqua Teen Hunger Force
  - The Raspberry Brothers: The Karate Kid
  - The Hangover
  - Jaws 3-D
  - When You're Strange: A Film About The Doors
- Troo Music Lounge hosted by Budweiser
  - Joe Robinson
  - The Non-Commissioned Officers
  - Frontier Ruckus
  - Elizabeth Cook
  - Sarah Jarosz
  - Tiny Animals
  - Frank Turner
  - The Constellations
  - Joshua James
- Solar Stage:
  - Hunab Kru Breakdancing
  - Gypsy Hands Tribal Dance
  - The Wildrovers
  - Jaik Willis
  - African Drum and Dance by Mawre & Company
  - Bonnaroo Beard & Mustache Competition
  - Jonathan Sexton and the Big Love Choir
  - African Drum and Dance by Mawre & Company
  - Poetix / Hunab Kru Breakdancing
  - RhythMystik Tribal Percussion
- The Silent Disco Powered by Vitaminwater:
  - DJ Equal
  - Gypsyphonic Disko
  - Eclectic Method
  - Jared Dietch
- The Lunar Stage:
  - Green Day: Rock Band Experience
  - 2010 NBA Finals Game 4
  - Dieselboy
  - LA Riots
  - Afrojack
  - Sharam

=== Friday, June 11 ===
(artists listed from earliest to latest set times)

- What Stage:
  - Mighty Clouds of Joy
  - Damian Marley & Nas
  - Tenacious D
  - Kings of Leon
- Which Stage:
  - Trombone Shorty & Orleans Avenue
  - The Gaslight Anthem
  - Umphrey's McGee
  - The National
  - Michael Franti & Spearhead
  - The Flaming Lips & Stardeath and White Dwarfs perform The Dark Side of the Moon
- This Tent:
  - Julia Nunes
  - Jay Electronica
  - Gossip
  - She & Him
  - Tori Amos
  - Bassnectar
  - LCD Soundsystem
- That Tent:
  - Punch Brothers featuring Chris Thile
  - Carolina Chocolate Drops
  - Hot Rize
  - The Nitty Gritty Dirt Band
  - Steve Martin and the Steep Canyon Rangers
  - The Black Keys
  - Kid Cudi
  - B.o.B
- The Other Tent:
  - Tokyo Police Club
  - Edward Sharpe & the Magnetic Zeros
  - Dr. Dog
  - OK Go
  - Les Claypool
  - Daryl Hall & Chromeo
  - Galactic
- Sonic Stage:
  - The Entrance Band
  - Diane Birch
  - Elizabeth Cook
  - Steep Canyon Rangers
  - Punch Brothers
  - Carolina Chocolate Drops
  - Disco Biscuits
  - Umphrey's McGee
  - Hot Rize
  - Lotus
- The Comedy Theatre:
  - Conan O'Brien
  - Margaret Cho with Baron Vaughn & John Roberts (2 Sets)
  - Jeffrey Ross Roasts Bonnaroo with Chelsea Peretti
- Cafe Where?:
  - Jill Andrews
  - The RBC
  - Boy Crisis
  - Alyssa Bonagura
  - Samantha Crain
- Cinema Tent:
  - Super Fly
  - Conan O'Brien (Live Feed from The Comedy Theatre)
  - The Raspberry Brothers: Footloose
  - Rock the Earth Q&A: Sarah Bush and Anne Bedarf
  - Salva Tres Palmas
  - Adult Swim's Childrens Hospital
  - Adult Swim's Robot Chicken
  - Shaun of the Dead
  - Zombieland
  - Inglourious Basterds
- Troo Music Lounge hosted by Budweiser:
  - Jessie Baylin
  - The Young Veins
  - Kevin Devine
  - Nneka
  - The Bridge
  - The Moondoggies
  - Dawes
  - The Bakerton Group
  - Warpaint
  - Royal Bangs
- Solar Stage:
  - Shiloh Circle
  - Gypsy Hands Tribal Dance
  - Rock the Earth Panel Discussion "Social Change Through Music"
  - The Poetix Vanguard
  - Rock the Earth Interview & Performance Diane Birch
  - Rock the Earth Interview & Performance Special Guest
  - Josh Phillips Folk Festival
  - Bonnaroo Beard & Mustache Competition
  - African Drum and Dance by Mawre & Company
  - Joshua James
  - Here's To the Long Haul
  - The Poetix Vanguard
  - Hunab Kru Breakdancing
  - Gypsy Hands Tribal Dance
  - Miss Lolly Pop's Burlesque Coterie
- The Silent Disco Powered by Vitaminwater:
  - Motion Potion
  - Eclectic Method
  - DJ Equal
  - DJ Logic
- The Lunar Stage:
  - Live Screening of Conan O'Brien from The Comedy Theatre
  - The Beatles: Rock Band Experience
  - Eclectic Method
  - Hercules and Love Affair (DJ Set)
  - The Crystal Method
  - Mark Knight
  - Lee Burridge

=== Saturday, June 12 ===
(artists listed from earliest to latest set times)

- What Stage:
  - Big Sam's Funky Nation
  - Jimmy Cliff
  - The Dead Weather
  - Stevie Wonder
  - Jay-Z
- Which Stage:
  - Rebelution
  - Baaba Maal
  - Norah Jones
  - The Avett Brothers
  - Weezer
- This Tent:
  - Circa Survive
  - Isis
  - Melvins
  - Jeff Beck
  - Dan Deacon Ensemble
  - Deadmau5
- That Tent:
  - Langhorne Slim
  - Brandi Carlile
  - Dave Rawlings Machine
  - Mumford & Sons
  - John Prine
  - Thievery Corporation
  - Disco Biscuits
- The Other Tent:
  - Bomba Estéreo
  - Mexican Institute of Sound
  - Nortec Collective Presents Bostich and Fussible
  - Aterciopelados
  - Los Amigos Invisibles
  - Ozomatli
  - Clutch
  - Gwar
- Sonic Stage:
  - Dawes
  - The Postelles
  - Julia Nunes
  - Bomba Estéreo
  - Big Sam's Funky Nation
  - Imelda May
  - Clutch
  - Brandi Carlile
  - Aterciopelados
  - Circa Survive
- The Comedy Theatre:
  - Conan O'Brien
  - Jeffrey Ross Roasts Bonnaroo with Chelsea Peretti
  - Aziz Ansari, Nick Kroll, Paul Scheer & Rob Huebel
  - Benson / Burnham / Giraldo featuring Chelsea Peretti
- Cafe Where?:
  - Imelda May
  - Morning Teleportation
  - Angus & Julia Stone
- Cinema Tent:
  - 180 South
  - Conan O'Brien (Live Feed from The Comedy Theatre)
  - Green Screens: Ryan Stasik (Umphrey's McGee) / Q&A Monnie Monteleone
  - When You're Strange: A Film About The Doors
  - The Secret To A Happy Ending (Drive-By Truckers Documentary)
  - The Decemberists: Here Come the Waves
  - Adult Swim's Childrens Hospital
  - The Hangover
  - Footloose
  - Short Circuit
- Troo Music Lounge hosted by Budweiser:
  - Jonathan Tyler and the Northern Lights
  - Elmwood
  - Truth & Salvage Co.
  - Paper Tongues
  - Red Cortez
  - The Middle East
  - Harper Simon
  - Jonathan Sexton & The Big Love Choir
  - Lissie
- Solar Stage:
  - The Wildrovers
  - Hunab Kru Breakdancing
  - Rock the Earth Panel Discussion "Social Change Through Music"
  - The Poetix Vanguard
  - RhythMystik Tribal Percussion
  - Rock the Earth Interview Baaba Maal
  - Rock The Earth Interview & Performance Julia Nunes
  - The Poetix Vanguard
  - Bonnaroo Beard & Mustache Competition
  - Ogya
  - African Drum and Dance by Mawre & Company
  - Jill Andrews
  - The Poetix Vanguard
  - Hunab Kru Breakdancing
  - Gypsy Hands Tribal Dance
  - Miss Lolly Pop's Burlesque Coterie
- The Silent Disco Powered by Vitaminwater:
  - DJ Logic
  - DJ Equal
  - Motion Potion
- The Lunar Stage:
  - World Cup: England v. USA
  - The Beatles: Rock Band Experience
  - Eclectic Method
  - Danny Howells
  - Kaskade
  - Timo Maas

=== Sunday, June 13 ===
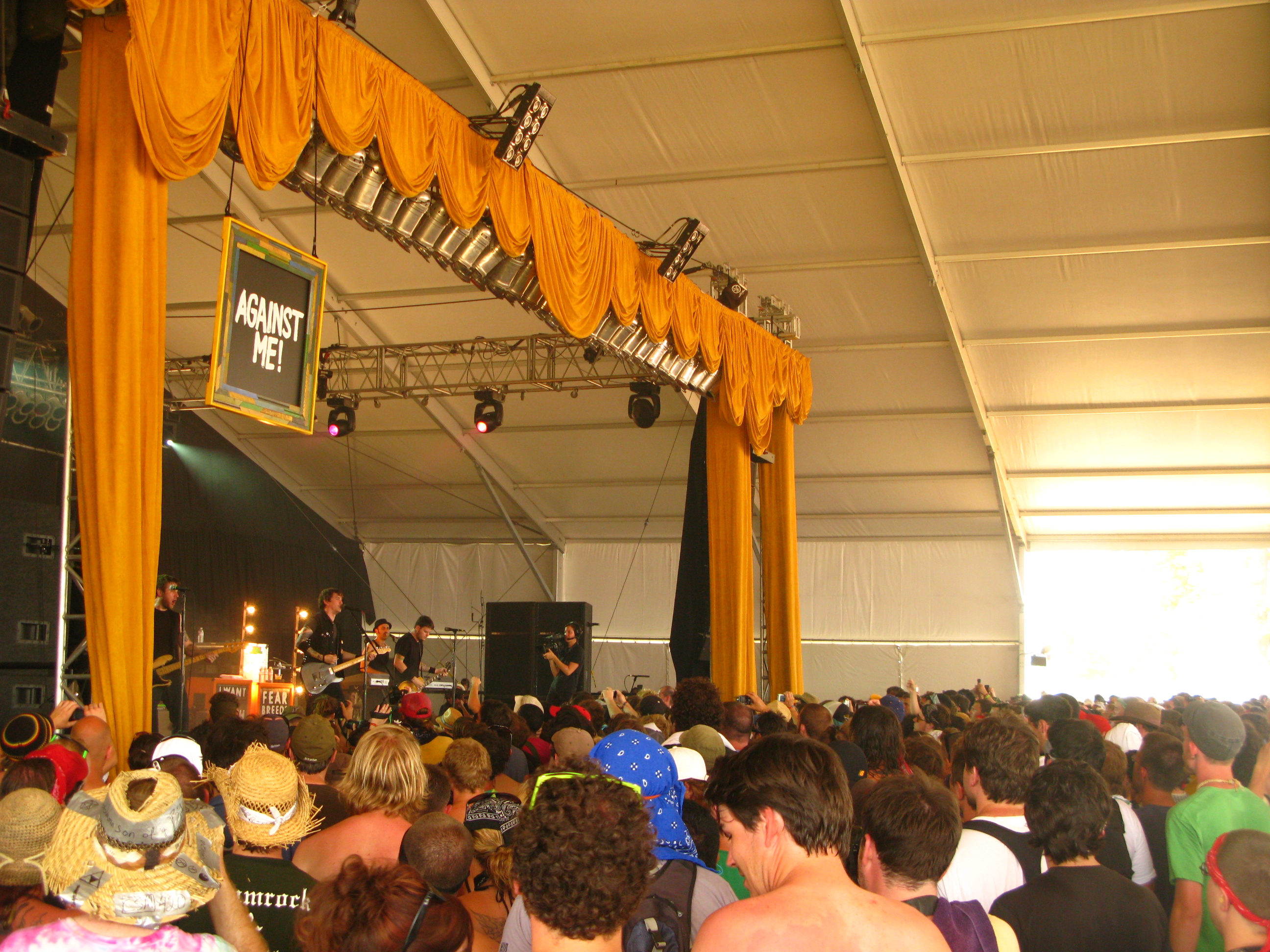
Against Me! performing

(artists listed from earliest to latest set times)

- What Stage:
  - John Butler Trio
  - John Fogerty
  - Zac Brown Band
  - Dave Matthews Band
- Which Stage:
  - Tinariwen
  - Calexico
  - Regina Spektor
  - Ween
  - Phoenix
- This Tent:
  - Japandroids
  - Lucero
  - Against Me!
  - Dropkick Murphys
  - Rise Against
- That Tent:
  - Monte Montgomery
  - Cross Canadian Ragweed
  - Jamey Johnson
  - Kris Kristofferson
  - Miranda Lambert
- The Other Tent:
  - Ingrid Michaelson
  - Martin Sexton
  - Blues Traveler
  - They Might Be Giants
  - Medeski Martin & Wood
- Sonic Stage:
  - Truth & Salvage Co.
  - Danny Barnes
  - Orgone
  - Harper Simon
  - Medeski Martin & Wood
  - Martin Sexton
  - John Butler
  - Cross Canadian Ragweed
  - Monte Montgomery
  - Blues Traveler
- The Comedy Theatre:
  - Aziz Ansari, Nick Kroll, Paul Scheer & Rob Huebel
  - Benson / Burnham / Giraldo featuring Chelsea Peretti
  - Aziz Ansari, Nick Kroll, Paul Scheer & Rob Huebel (2 Sets)
- Cafe Where?:
  - Danny Barnes
  - How I Became The Bomb
  - Mike Posner
- Cinema Tent:
  - Love Noise
  - Green Screens by Rock the Earth: The Cove with John Popper, Joseph Chisolm, Charles Hamberton
  - Infantree: Food for Thought
  - Exit Through the Gift Shop
  - Adult Swim's Tim and Eric's Check It Out!
  - The White Stripes: Under Great White Northern Lights
  - Country First
  - Inglourious Basterds
- Troo Music Lounge hosted by Budweiser:
  - The Devil Makes Three
  - Caitlin Rose
  - Tamarama
  - Supagroup
  - Space Capone
  - Everest
  - Orgone
- Solar Stage:
  - Ogya
  - African Drum and Dance by Mawre & Company
  - Rock the Earth Panel Discussion "Social Change Through Music"
  - The Poetix Vanguard
  - Rock The Earth Interview & Performance Here's to the Long Haul
  - Rock the Earth Interview & Performance Special Guest
  - Rock the Earth Interview & Performance Danny Barnes
  - The Poetix Vanguard
  - Bonnaroo Beard & Mustache Competition
  - Hunab Kru Breakdancing
  - Gypsy Hands Tribal Dance
  - Josh Phillips Folk Festival
  - Gypsy Hands Tribal Dance
- The Silent Disco Powered by Vitaminwater:
  - Motion Potion
- The Lunar Stage:
  - World Cup: Germany v. Australia
  - Green Day: Rock Band Experience
  - 2010 NBA Finals Game 5

== Notes ==
- As in 2009, no Superjam took place. It returned in 2011.
