= Corbu (band) =

American musical duo

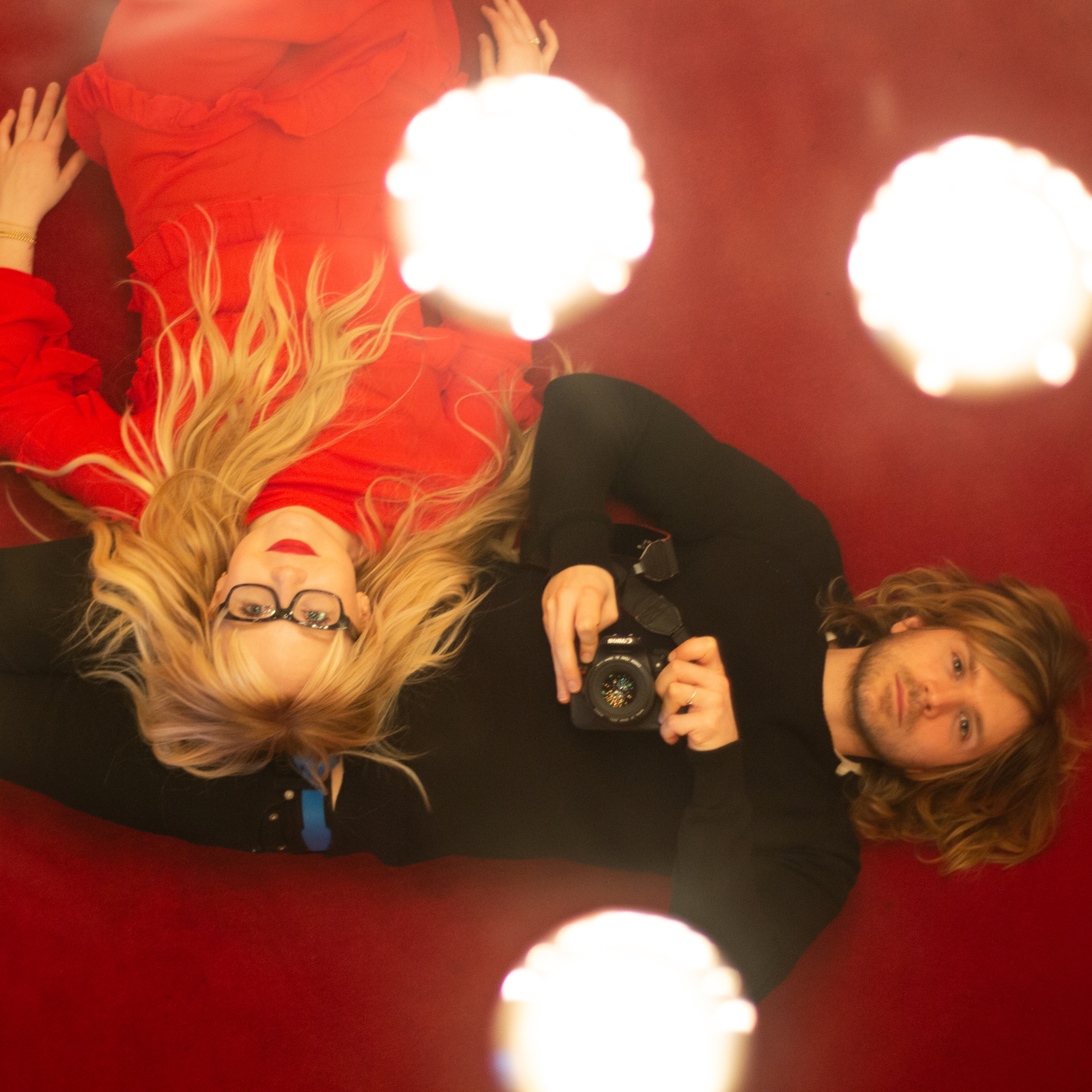

Background information
- Origin: Brooklyn, New York
- Genres: Neo-Psychedelia, Electronic, Dream Pop
- Years active: 2014-present
- Labels: 3Beat (EU), Big Picnic (US)
- Members: Jonathan Graves, Amanda Scott
- Website: www.corbucorbu.com

Corbu is an American musical duo based in Brooklyn, New York. The duo is headed by Jonathan Graves on vocals and Amanda Scott on synth and percussion.

The band released the EP We Are Sound in 2014, and the EP Everything You Imagine is Real in 2015.

Their debut album, Crayon Soul was mixed by Dave Fridmann, and released in August 2016. Following the debut of Crayon Soul, Corbu supported Bloc Party on a United States tour. Their track "Battles" was picked up by The Sunday Times, and featured an animated music video directed by Daniel Cordero

== History ==
Graves and Scott, both originally from Pittsburgh, Pennsylvania, met in New York City. After recording their first single, "We Are Sound," it was played by Zane Lowe on BBC Radio 1 in 2014. That year, Corbu remixed "You & I (Forever)" by Jessie Ware, landing them on the Red Bull Music Awards 20 before 15 list. The name Corbu comes from the French architect, writer, designer, and painter Le Corbusier.

In addition to their Bloc Party tour, Corbu played at Austin City Limits in 2016, and Electric Forest in 2017.
