= Bryce Menchaca =

American rock singer-songwriter

- Born: April 7, 2001 (age 25)
- Occupations: Singer; songwriter; actor
- Years active: 2014–present
- Height: 5 ft 10 in (178 cm)
- Musical career
- Genres: Rock; indie rock; Folk
- Instruments: Vocals; guitar; piano; bass; drums
- Label: BMG
- Website: brycemenchacamusic.com

Bryce Menchaca (born 2001) is an American singer-songwriter and actor. He has released two studio albums and two EPs as well as multiple singles.

== Early life ==
Bryce Menchaca grew up in San Antonio, Texas. Around the age of 9, he began playing music and writing his own material. His early influences include the Beatles, B. B. King, and Bruce Springsteen. In 2019, he relocated to Denver, Colorado.

== Career ==
In 2017, Menchaca released his first studio album, Sense of Discovery. Another album followed in late 2020 entitled Alone at Last, Alone It Seems. Also in 2020, he scored the soundtrack to the film, Destination Unknown, for which he won Best Score at the 2020 FFTG Awards. In October 2021, Menchaca signed a co-publishing deal with BMG as a songwriter. He appeared on a main stage slot at the Underground Music Showcase in both July 2022 and July 2023, as well as at the Electric Forest music festival in June 2022. He also starred in a supporting role for an Up TV production, Just Jake. In 2024 Menchaca formed the band Marfa with collaborator and friend Kellen Wall.

== Discography ==
=== Studio albums ===
- Sense of Discovery (2017)
- Alone at Last, Alone It Seems (2020)

=== EPs ===
- The Doomed Poet (2019)
- Salt (2023)
- Pepper (2024)

== Awards and nominations ==
Award	Year	Nominee(s)	Category	Result	Ref.
FFTG Awards	2020	Destination Unknown	FFTG Award for Best Score	Won	
