= Double JJ Resort =

Resort

- Location within Michigan

General information
- Location: West Michigan, 5900 Water Road, Rothbury, MI 49452
- Coordinates: 43.53862°N 86.3674°W
- Opening: 1937

Other information
- Number of rooms: 162
- Number of suites: 83
- Number of restaurants: Nine: The Sundance Restaurant, Rustler's Roost, Miner's Gulp, The Waterin' Hole (seasonal), The Ice Cream Parlor (seasonal), Shooter's Saloon (seasonal), The Silver Dollar (seasonal), Cactus Jack's (seasonal)
- Parking: Parking Lots

Website
- doublejj.com

Double JJ Resort is located in Rothbury, Michigan. It is a four-season resort which opened as the Jack and Jill Ranch in 1937. It has been the location of the Rothbury Music Festival two times, and has hosted the Electric Forest Festival annually since 2011. Double JJ has expanded to include a golf course, an indoor water park, indoor mini golf, and an old western mock town, known as the "Back Forty".

== History ==
In 1914 George and Mary Stouch left their home in Central Germany and settled on 80 acres (32 ha) of farmland in Western Michigan. The farm included a brick home built by the Kennedy family in 1894. The land also embraced a large, spring fed lake, Big Wildcat Lake.

In 1930 daughter Roma was employed as an instructor at a private school for girls. She was the first to use the lake setting and surrounding woods at their father's farm commercially. She presented a summer camping experience at Wildcat Lake to her students, hoping to get their parents approval. Roma would be the counselor and instruct 8- to 12-year-olds in outdoor camping, crafts, swimming, drama, dancing, and sports, including horseback riding. Her project got parental approval, and her first year brought 23 girls to her camp. The camp was named "Cedar Shores" because of the hundreds of white cedar trees surrounding the lake. A stone wall at the corner of Water and Clay roads stands today with an embedded bronze plaque marking the site of the first family business attempt.

The deep depression of the early 1930 cut short Roma's efforts and the Cedar Shores experience faded into history.

The beauty of the lake and ease of camping was well known in the community, and during the summer of 1933 the family invited local church congregations to send their children to the farm for a supervised, well counseled summer vacation. This was the Cedar Shores experience two years later, but with kids. To honor their young guests the family renamed the farm "The Jack and Jill Ranch". Although the kids' ranch remained only two years (followed by a more grandiose camping experience) the name Jack and Jill Ranch was a success beyond imagination and the property was called by that name until the mid-1970s when the owners decided to change the name to the Double JJ Ranch Resort, and in 2009 to the Double JJ Resort.

George Storm (having changed his name from Stouch to Storm) was teaching psychology at University of Miami, Florida, in 1934. In addition to his classes in speech, public speaking, and psychology, he was head counselor to departing senior students. He learned that they enjoyed their vacations with people their own age. His concept of bringing people of the same age (18 to 35) together for an outdoor vacation and camping experience was a winner. He had just the place: The Jack and Jill Ranch. In 1936 George Storm, the college professor and visionary, took control and with family help embarked on his concept. He named the new venture The Jack and Jill Colony Camp, later changed to the Jack and Jill Ranch. The ranch grew and expanded as George bought neighboring farms and extended marketing.

The resort continues its growth to this day, drawing guests from all over the world. Keeping the Western culture and heritage in place with an emphasis on treating guests to warm, friendly, family-like experience has given the resort the distinction of being the biggest western style dude ranch east of the Mississippi.

== Rothbury Festival and Electric Forest Festival ==
The Rothbury Festival (now known as the Electric Forest Festival) was held on Double JJ's property for the first time in 2008. Performers during the festival included Snoop Dogg, 311, and John Mayer.

Due to concerns over the ownership of the ranch, as well as the potential sale of the festival grounds, there was originally uncertainty on whether or not a second festival would be held in 2009. A major hurdle was overcome when a federal bankruptcy judge cleared the way for a lease of the festival property between the bankruptcy trustee and Anschutz Entertainment Group. Performers in 2009 included Guster, Flogging Molly, and Bob Dylan.

== Bankruptcy ==
The Double JJ Ranch filed for bankruptcy in July 2008. The resort was slated to be sold at an auction, however Progressive Resorts LLC stepped forward at the last minute to purchase the entire resort and re-open it as such.

The ownership has changed hands five times with each ranch host expanding and improving this destination resort. Progressive Resorts, LLC. purchased the resort from bankruptcy court in 2009, and reopened the resort that August.

== Present day ==
Today there are in excess of 1,000 acres (400 ha) of ranch property, three large lakes, the Thoroughbred Golf Club (1993), Sundance Saloon & Steakhouse (1996), Back Forty resort for kids and families (1998), and most recently the 60,000-square-foot (5,600 m^{2}) Gold Rush Indoor Waterpark and adjoining condo rental suites (2006).

The Thoroughbred Golf Club is a course designed by Arthur Hills.
