= Joe Hertler & The Rainbow Seekers =

American rock band

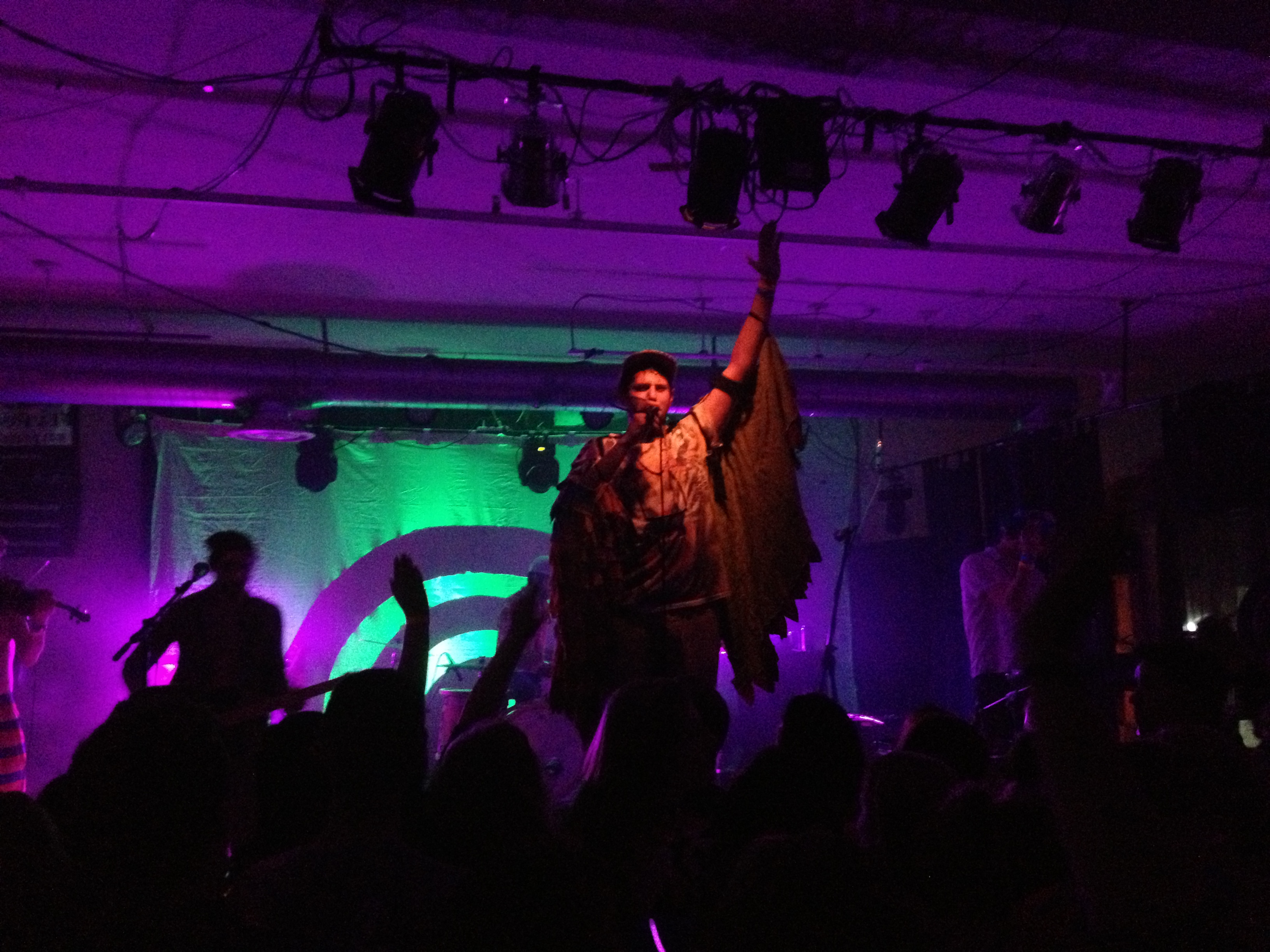
- Joe Hertler Live at The Loft in Lansing Michigan in 2014

Background information
- Also known as: JH&TRS, The Rainbow Seekers
- Origin: Lansing, Michigan, United States
- Genres: Rock, americana, soul, jam, folk rock, bluegrass, funk rock, pop rock, alternative rock
- Years active: 2011–present
- Labels: Bad Mascot / Universal (US), Bigger Brush Media (ROW)
- Members: Joe Hertler; Ryan Hoger; Rick Hale; Aaron Stinson; Micah Bracken; Kevin Pritchard (non-touring member / producer); Jason Combs; Ryan McMahon
- Past members: Kim Vi; Shawn Adams; Joshua Holcomb
- Website: joehertler.com

Joe Hertler & The Rainbow Seekers is an American rock band from Michigan, led by musician, songwriter, and producer, Joe Hertler. He primarily composes his songs on acoustic guitar.

== History ==
Joe Hertler recorded his first album "The Hard Times LP" in 2009 as a Sophomore at Central Michigan University, in his dorm room. He started performing music publicly at Kaya Coffee House in Mt. Pleasant, Michigan to impress a girl who hosted an open-mic night. His second solo release "Sleeping Giant EP" was released in 2010, independently. He formed his band The Rainbow Seekers, after meeting guitarist Ryan Hoger in college and performing alongside bassist Kevin Pritchard, keyboardist Shawn Adams, saxophonist Aaron Stinson, and drummer Rick Hale on New Year's Eve 2010 during Mittenfest, in Ypsilanti, Michigan. The band name The Rainbow Seekers originated from Joe Sample's album titled Rainbow Seeker.

=== 2011-13: On Being ===
In November 2011 the band released On Being via Bigger Brush Media. The band performed at CMJ Music Marathon in Brooklyn, New York, Common Ground Music Festival in Lansing, Michigan, Electric Forest Festival in Rothbury, Michigan, and South By Southwest Music Festival in Austin, TX.

==== Track-listing ====
1. Ego Loss on Grand River Avenue
2. We Are Everything
3. Oh, Dear Lover
4. Carbon c14
5. Good Times
6. What It Feels Like To Drown
7. Ask The Dust (sometimes listed as Ask The Dusk)
8. Devil, Don't You Steal My Bicycle
9. Best Friend
10. J.L. Hudson
11. The Quilt (Bonus)

The band performed often wearing fur coats, Hawaiian shirts, and Joe Hertler wearing the state flag of Michigan as a cape, and played alongside artists like Electric Six, Frontier Ruckus, The Civil Wars, Matt Pond PA, Dale Earnhardt Jr Jr, Breathe Owl Breathe, Chris Bathgate, and Atomic Tom, as well as selling out their own shows across Michigan.

=== 2013-15: The Russell Sessions & No Money (Jetski) ===
==== The Russell Sessions ====
In April 2013 the band released a limited edition 5 song CD/DVD titled The Russell Sessions, the content was shot at The Russell Industrial Center in Detroit, Michigan. The band also added Saxophonist Aaron Stinson, and keyboardist Micah Bracken replaced Shawn Adams.

===== Track-listing =====
1. The Garden [Live]
2. Your Story [Live]
3. Feel [Live]
4. River Runs Dry [Live]
5. Red Wings [Live]

==== No Money (Jetski) ====
The group released No Money (Jetski) as a single in April 2014, after attending South by Southwest Music Festival in Austin, TX where they recorded a music video for the song. The song was written when Joe Hertler was working as a student teacher and described himself as "desperately broke".

=== 2015-16: Terra Incognita ===
The band's sophomore album Terra Incognita was released on February 17, 2015, via a distribution deal with Universal Music Group's Bad Mascot label. Initially the album was planned for November 2014 release. The album was produced by the band's Bassist Kevin Pritchard, and recorded in the basement of a Dentist's office in Lansing, Michigan. Hertler claimed "We made [the album, in sections of] ‘Birth,’ Sex’ and ‘Death.’ It is the overarching theme of the record." After releasing the album the band went on their first US tour that included stops in Denver, Colorado, Los Angeles, California, Scottsdale, Arizona., and included another stop at South By Southwest in Austin, TX. Additionally the band added Violist Joshua Holcomb to their lineup. The band also performed at Summer Camp Music Festival in Illinois. While on tour the band plays Magic: The Gathering and Super Smash Bros. Melee.

==== Track-listing ====
1. The Garden
2. Your Story
3. Hometown
4. Captain America
5. Trying To Break Your Heart
6. Feel
7. Future Talk
8. Betelgeuse
9. King Is Dead
10. Here Be Dragons
11. River Runs Dry
12. Red Wings
13. Dr. Dre (Home For A Funeral) (Bonus Track)
14. No Money (Jetski) (Bonus Track)

In addition to the album release Hertler put out his first children's book titled The Beautiful Monster, which he wrote in college.

In May 2015 the band released their video for the song The Garden.

In July 2015, Spotify data revealed that the band was Ann Arbor's favorite band, along with the band Vulfpeck.

In December 2015, Music Industry Management Association declared Terra Incognita one of their favorite albums of 2015.

In 2016, the band mentioned they were working on new material to be released in fall or winter of 2016. Additionally the band performed at Bonnaroo Music Festival in Manchester, Tennessee, Common Ground Music Festival in Lansing, Michigan, Summer Camp Music Festival in Illinois & Backwoods Music Festival in Stroud, Oklahoma. The band also released a live video for the song Future Talk.

=== 2017: Pluto ===
On March 31, 2017, the band released its third studio album, "Pluto", through a successful crowdfunding campaign on the site, Kickstarter. This album marks a departure in production style for the band resulting in a more ambient, progressive direction. The album was generally well received by critics with Revue Magazine noting the album as "Stellar" and Sound & Silence gave the album a perfect 100% score, making it the current "Best" album of 2017.

The first single of the album, "Lonely", was released on February 3 with a corresponding music video to go along with it on Baeble Music. The band's second single, "Old Love", was premiered via YouTube on July 31, 2017.

== Discography ==
- On Being (2011)
- The Russell Sessions [Live] (2013)
- Terra Incognita (2015)
- Pluto (2017)
- Paper Castle (2019)
- Pursuit of Wonder (2023)
