= Motion Potion =

- Also known as: MoPo
- Born: Robbie Kowal; August 1973 (age 53); Boston, Massachusetts
- Genres: Funk, breakbeat, disco, remix
- Occupations: DJ, producer, concert organizer, founder and partner of Sunset Promotions
- Instruments: Turntables, Ableton, Pioneer CDJ-2000
- Years active: 1995–present

Robbie Kowal (born August 1973), also known by his professional names Motion Potion or MoPo, is an American DJ, record producer, and concert promoter. and event technology professional. Known for blending electronic music with the genres of funk, hip hop, and psychedelic rock, he first started mixing live in 1995.

Kowal was born in Boston, Massachusetts. After moving to his current base of San Francisco in 1997, he co-founded the concert promotion company Sunset Promotions or SunsetSF in 2001, which became known for producing festivals such as the SF Funk Fest and North Beach Jazz. Since then he has helped found and/or produce festivals and concert nights such as All Shook Down Music Festival, Sea of Dreams NYE, Ghost Ship Halloween, Loveboat Halloween, North Beach Jazz, Festival of the Golden Gate and Mojito Café. According to the Los Angeles Times, in 2006 MoPo was the first DJ to play a silent disco in the United States, and since then he has founded Silent Frisco, a headphone dance concert production company. In 2015, Silent Frisco and SunsetSF merged to become HUSHconcerts, an event production company that now contributes to more than 1000 events per year.

In recent years, Kowal has gone into 'semi retirement' as a DJ to focus on his duties at HUSHconcerts, and their trade show project Silent Conference. In that capacity, the San Francisco Weekly has called MoPo "the godfather of the silent disco," while SFist called him "one of the nation’s foremost purveyors of the 'Silent Disco' concept."

He still performs live occasionally, with Bottlerock Napa Valley and Electric Forest in Rothbury Michigan being his most consistent annual gigs. He has also been called on to play destination events for the love music community such as Dave & Tim Riviera Maya, Dead Ahead Riviera Maya, Avetts by the Beach, and Panic En La Playa. He periodically produces music, and in 2008 he released a series of three EPs titled Electric Nostalgia Vol. 1-3. In 2017, MoPo released a Radiohead-tribute remix album entitled 'Subterranean Homemade Alchemy' to raise awareness for social causes championed by the band.

== Notable performances ==
The following is a list of selected notable appearances by Motion Potion as a DJ:

- New Orleans Jazz & Heritage Festival (2000, 2001, 2003, etc.)
- San Francisco Funk Festival (2000-2004, 2008, etc.)
- High Sierra Music Festival (2000, 2001, 2002, 2012, 2013)
- Berkshire Mountain Music Festival (2001, 2002, 2003, etc.)
- North Beach Jazz Fest (2001, 2003, etc.) - produced 2003, 2007
- Gathering of the Vibes (2001, 2011, 2012, 2013, 2014)
- Bonnaroo Music Festival (2002, 2003, 2004, 2005, 2006, 2007, 2009, 2010, 2011)
- Burning Man Festival (2004, 2005, 2007, 2008, 2009, 2010, 2011, 2012, 2014)
- Jamcruise II (2004)
- Exotic Erotic Ball (2004, 2005) - host and DJ
- Noise Pop Festival (2006)
- Vegoose Festival (2006, 2007)
- Rothbury/Electric Forest Festival (2008, 2013, 2014, 2015, 2016, 2017, 2018, 2019, 2020, 2022, 2023, 2024, 2025, 2026)
- Camp Bisco (2009, 2011, 2012)
- Lightning in a Bottle (2009, 2013, 2014)
- Treasure Island Music Festival (2010, 2011, 2012, 2013, 2014, 2015, 2016, 2017)
- BottleRock Napa Valley (2015, 2016, 2017, 2018, 2019, 2020, 2021, 2022, 2023, 2024, 2025, 2026)
- La Onda Napa Valley (2024, 2025)
- Outside Lands Music and Arts Festival (2010, 2011, 2012, 2013, 2014, 2015, 2016, 2017, 2018, 2019, 2020, 2022)
- Metallica XXX (2011)
- Sonic Bloom (2012, 2014)
- Earthdance (2012)
- Panic en la Playa (2013, 2014)
- Avetts by the Beach (2017)
- Dave & Tim Riviera Maya (2017, 2024)
- Dead Ahead Riviera Maya (2024)

== Discography ==
=== EPs ===
Extended plays by Motion Potion
Year	Album title	Release details
2008	Electric Nostalgia Vol. 1	Released: 2008; Label: Self-released; Format: Digital download
2008	Electric Nostalgia Vol. 2	Released: 2008; Label: Self-released; Format: Digital download
2008	Electric Nostalgia Vol. 3	Released: 2008; Label: Self-released; Format: Digital download
2015	Subterranean Homemade Alchemy - AKA Subalchemy	Released: 2016; Label: Self-released; Format: Digital download

=== DJ mixes ===
Selected DJ mixes by Motion Potion
Year	Release title	Notes
2007	Erectrofly'd	Produced CD in May 2007
2007	Wet in Sweat	Produced CD in May 2007
2008	The History of Psychedelic Rock in Remix	Live mix CD
2008	A Decade of Kraak & Smaak	Live mix CD

=== Remixes/mashups ===
Selected remixes, mashups, and songs by Motion Potion
Year	Single name	Compilation/album	Release details
2006	"Break Yourself" (mashup by MoPo)	The Best Mashups In The World; Ever Are From San Francisco 2	BootieUSA (May 15, 2006)
2006	Various tracks	Bonnaroo Bangers	Bonnaroo

== See also ==
- Breakbeat
