= Tiny Animals =

American rock band

- Tiny Animals performing at Bonnaroo 2010.

Background information
- Origin: Katonah, New York, United States
- Genres: Alternative Rock
- Years active: 2007–present
- Label: North Street
- Members: Chris Howerton; Rita Howerton; Anton Kreisl
- Past members: Philip Galitzine
- Website: http://www.tinyanimals.net

Tiny Animals is an American alternative rock band from Katonah, New York. Formed in early 2007, the group consisted of siblings Chris Howerton (lead vocals/guitar) and Rita Maye (drums/vocals). Anton Kreisl (bass/vocals) joined in early 2008 to replace Philip Galitzine (currently a member of the band Atomic Tom).

== History ==
Tiny Animals was formed in 2007 by siblings Chris Howerton and Rita Maye approximately one year after Howerton's previous band, Fighterpilot, broke up. Fighterpilot, of which Anton Kreisl was also a member, never formally released an album, but several of the songs were included on Tiny Animals' debut album, Sweet Sweetness. After the album was recorded with original bassist Philip Galitzine in August 2007 by Canadian producer/engineer Darryl Neudorf, the band decided to re-record and self-produce all 12 songs in the fall of 2008. The majority of these tracks were mixed by Claudius Mittendorfer, best known for his work with Interpol, Muse, Franz Ferdinand, and Ash. On May 12, 2009, the album was released by Howerton's record label, North Street Records, which is also home to bands such as Dirty on Purpose and TAB the Band. Critical reception of the album was generally favorable and exposure was bolstered by radio play on NYC's 92.3 K-Rock (WXRK), Boston's WFNX, and an "MP3 of the day" feature on AOL Spinner.

In June 2009, Tiny Animals recorded a performance of "Useless" for the syndicated program Fearless Music.

In the fall of 2009, the band achieved success at college radio by peaking at No. 131 on the CMJ Top 200 College Radio chart. The album remained on the chart for over a month.

Tiny Animals' tour history includes showcases at major music festivals SXSW 2008 and CMJ Music Marathon 2007, '08, and '09. The band was also selected to perform at Bonnaroo 2010.

== Media ==
Tiny Animals' music has been licensed to such shows as MTV's The Real World: Cancun and The Real World XXIII: Washington DC, MTV's Teen Mom, MTV's College Life, and MTV's 16 and Pregnant.

One of the band's other songs called "Norway", which had been previously recorded by Fighterpilot and another song called "Is this the last time" (Season 3, Ep.2) was featured on MTV's extremely popular series, Jersey Shore (TV series).

The band's first music video for the song "Useless" was filmed in August 2009 and released on September 9, 2009. It was later hosted on major sites such as MTV.com.

== Discography ==
Year	Title	Label
2009	Sweet Sweetness	North Street Records
2011	Our Own Time	North Street Records
2017	Such Stuff As Dreams Are Made On	North Street Records
