= Cannons (band) =

American indie pop band

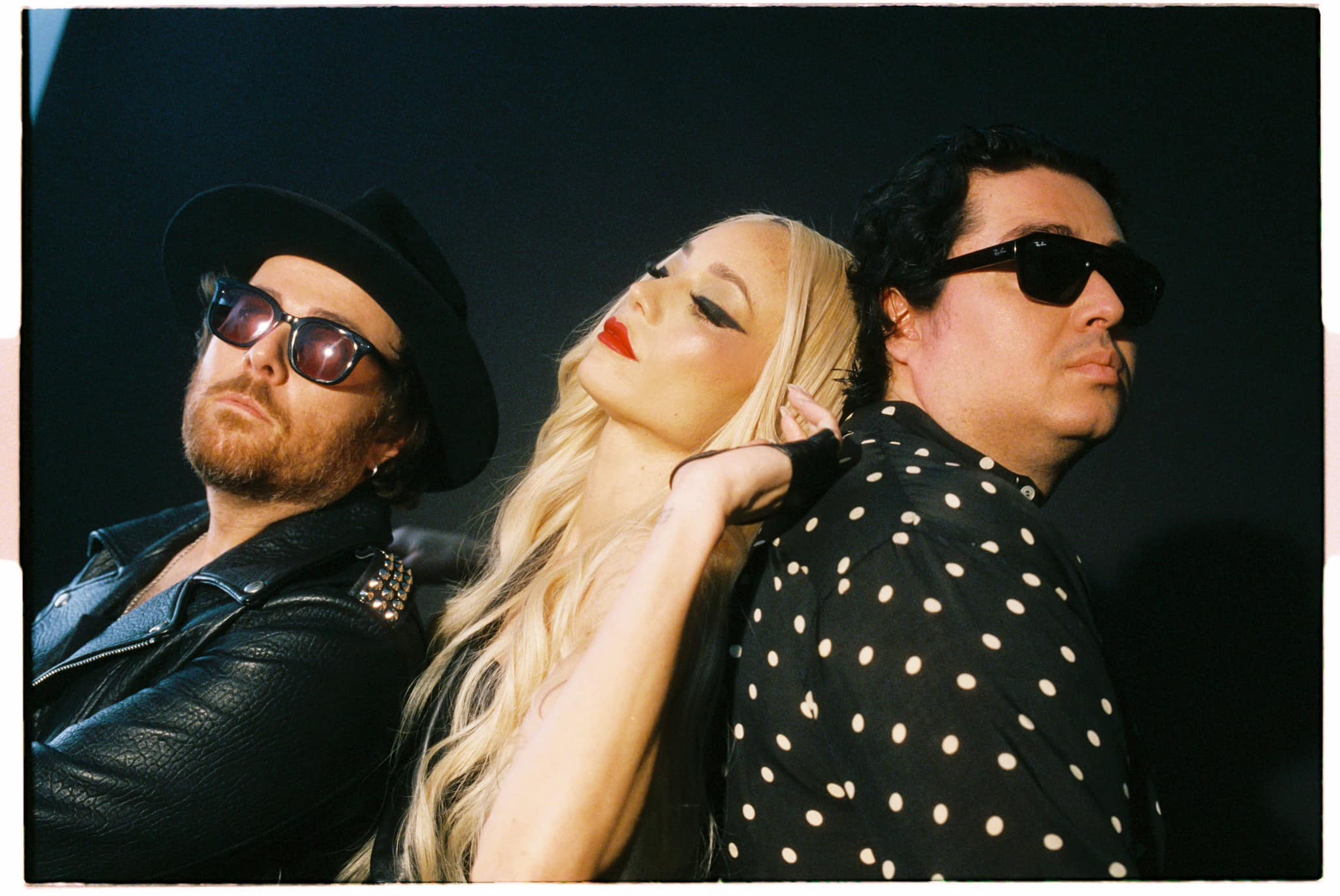

Background information
- Origin: Los Angeles, California, U.S.
- Genres: Indie pop; dream pop; electropop; synthwave
- Years active: 2013–present
- Label: Columbia
- Members: Ryan Clapham; Paul Davis; Michelle Joy
- Website: cannonstheband.com

Cannons are an American indie pop band formed in 2013 in Los Angeles. The band consists of lead vocalist Michelle Joy, lead guitarist Ryan Clapham, and keyboardist and bass guitarist Paul Davis.

== History ==
Ryan Clapham and Paul Davis, who have been friends since childhood, began composing music together in their teenage years. In 2013, Clapham and Davis formed Cannons with Michelle Joy after meeting her through the website Craigslist, where she had posted an advertisement seeking a band in need of a vocalist. The trio collaborated on early Cannons material over the Internet, with Clapham and Davis emailing musical tracks to Joy, who would then email back her own lyrical and vocal contributions.

Cannons issued their first EP Up All Night in 2014. The band then released their debut album Night Drive in 2017, as well as a second EP, In a Heartbeat, the following year. Shadows, Cannons' second album, was released in 2019 by AntiFragile Music. "Fire for You", the first single from Shadows, gained significant commercial traction after being featured in a 2020 episode of the comedy-drama TV series Never Have I Ever. The band subsequently signed to Columbia Records. In early 2021, "Fire for You" reached number one on the Billboard Alternative Airplay chart. Fever Dream, the band's third album, was released in March 2022.

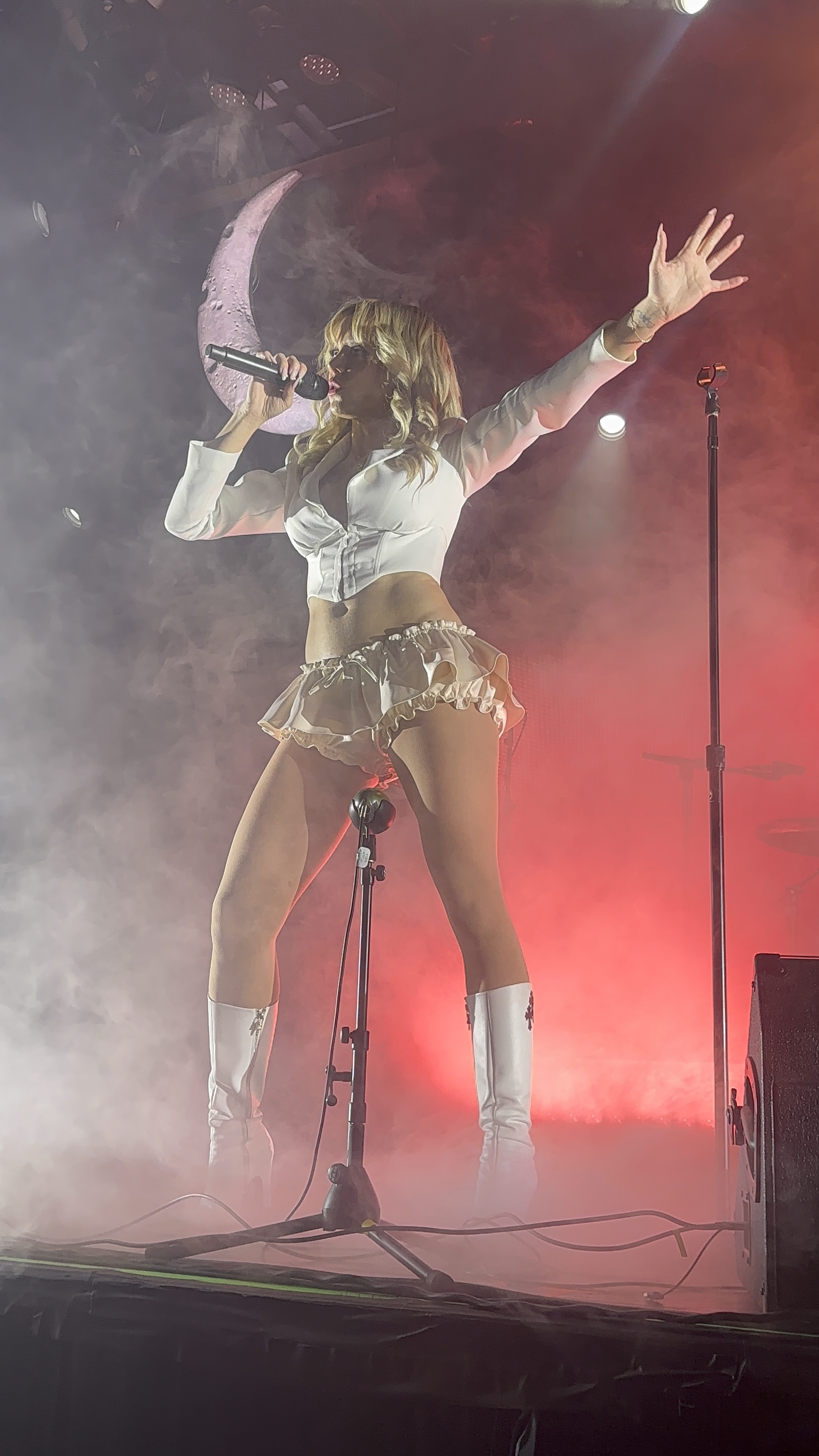
Cannons lead singer Michelle Joy performs at The Fillmore in Philadelphia, PA on April 10, 2026.

After teasing their fourth album for some months, and releasing three prior singles from the album, Cannons announced that Heartbeat Highway would be released on November 10, 2023, preceded by a fourth single, "Crush".

On October 17, 2025, Cannons released a new single titled "All I Need". This was followed by the single "Starlight" on January 30, 2026, along with the announcement of their fifth studio album Everything Glows, released on March 27, 2026. Cannons joined Grammy Award winning Bob Moses in 2026 for a co-headlining tour throughout the United States. Dubbed The Afterglow Tour, the show was very well received by critics and fans.

== Members ==
- Ryan Clapham – guitar
- Paul Davis – bass, drums, keyboards
- Michelle Joy – vocals

== Discography ==
=== Studio albums ===
List of studio albums
Title	Details
Night Drive	Released: May 12, 2017; Label: Self-released; Formats: Digital download
Shadows	Released: July 12, 2019; Label: AntiFragile / Columbia; Formats: Digital download, LP
Fever Dream	Released: March 25, 2022; Label: Columbia; Formats: Digital download, LP
Heartbeat Highway	Released: November 10, 2023; Label: Columbia; Formats: Digital download, LP
Everything Glows	Released: March 27, 2026; Label: Columbia; Formats: Digital download, LP, CD

=== Extended plays ===
List of extended plays
Title	Details
Up All Night	Released: September 1, 2014; Label: Personal; Formats: Digital download
In a Heartbeat	Released: July 13, 2018; Label: Self-released; Formats: Digital download
Covers by Cannons	Released: April 30, 2021; Label: Columbia; Formats: Digital download

=== Singles ===
List of singles, with selected chart positions, showing year released and album name
Title	Year	Peak chart positions				Certifications	Album
Title	Year	US AAA	US Alt.	US Dance	CAN Rock	Certifications	Album
"Spells"	2015	—	—	—	—		Non-album singles
"Down on Love"	2015	—	—	—	—		Non-album singles
"Call You Out"	2016	—	—	—	—		Non-album singles
"Mood Ring"	2016	—	—	—	—		Night Drive
"High Off Love"	2016	—	—	—	—		Night Drive
"Backwards"	2018	—	—	—	—		In a Heartbeat
"Round and Round"	2018	—	—	—	—		In a Heartbeat
"Fire for You"	2019	2	1	9	11	RIAA: Platinum	Shadows
"Talk Talk"	2019	—	—	—	—		Shadows
"Bad Dream"	2021	24	3	—	27		Fever Dream
"Ruthless"	2021	—	—	—	—		Fever Dream
"Purple Sun"	2022	—	—	—	—		Fever Dream
"Hurricane"	2022	—	—	—	—		Fever Dream
"Loving You"	2023	24	2	—	18		Heartbeat Highway
"Desire"	2023	—	—	—	—		Heartbeat Highway
"Bad Tattoo"	2023	—	—	—	—		Heartbeat Highway
"Crush"	2023	—	—	—	—		Heartbeat Highway
"All I Need"	2025	—	—	—	—		Everything Glows
"Starlight"	2026	12	13	—	—		Everything Glows
"These Nights"	2026	—	—	—	—		Everything Glows
"Light as a Feather"	2026	—	—	—	—		Everything Glows
"—" denotes a recording that did not chart or was not released in that territory.
