= Dozier =

Dozier is a surname. Notable people with the surname include:

- Beau Dozier (1979–2025), American songwriter, record producer, multi-instrumentalist and television producer
- Brian Dozier (born 1987), baseball player
- Curtis Dozier, author
- D. J. Dozier (born 1965), American baseball and football player
- Edward Dozier (1916–1971), Pueblo Native American anthropologist and linguist
- Gil Dozier (1934–2013), Louisiana politician
- Henrietta Cuttino Dozier (1872–1947), American architect
- Hunter Dozier (born 1991), baseball player
- James L. Dozier (born 1931), US Army general
- James C. Dozier (1885–1974), Medal of Honor Recipient
- Kimberly Dozier (born 1966), CBS News correspondent
- Lamont Dozier (1941–2022), American musician, father of Beau
- PJ Dozier (born 1996), American basketball player
- Robert Dozier (born 1985), American basketball player
- Ronnie Dozier (born 1987), American recording artist
- Scott Dozier (1970–2019), American convicted murderer
- William Dozier (1908–1991), American film and television producer

== See also ==
- Dozier Farm, historical house in Nashville, Tennessee, USA.
- Dozier Dome
- Florida School for Boys, also known as the Arthur G. Dozier School for Boys, a youth reform school in Florida shut down in 2011 after a notorious history of abuse
- Holland-Dozier-Holland, songwriting trio that included Lamont Dozier
