= Silent disco =

Dancing to music via headphones

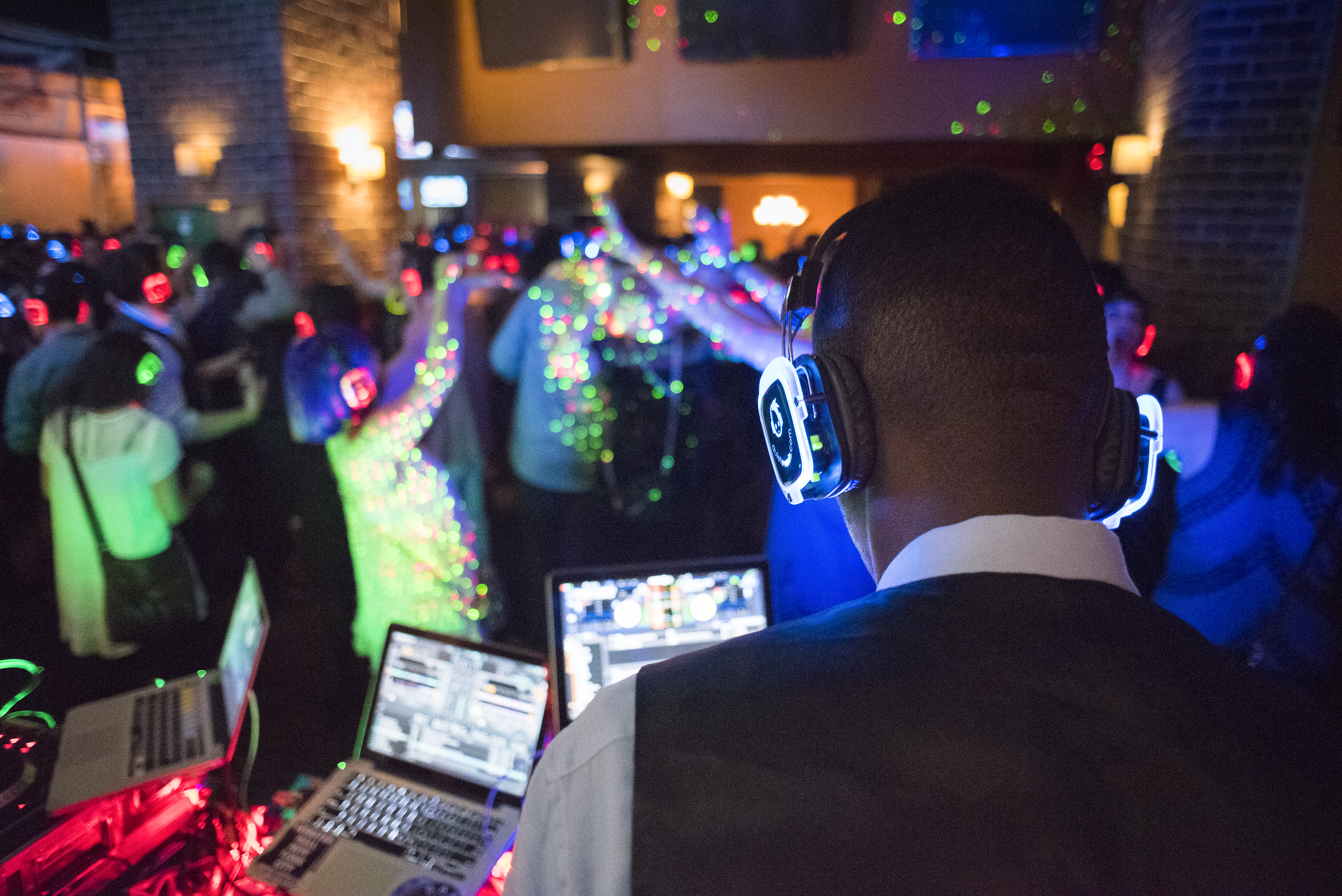
Silent disco party in New York on April 8, 2016

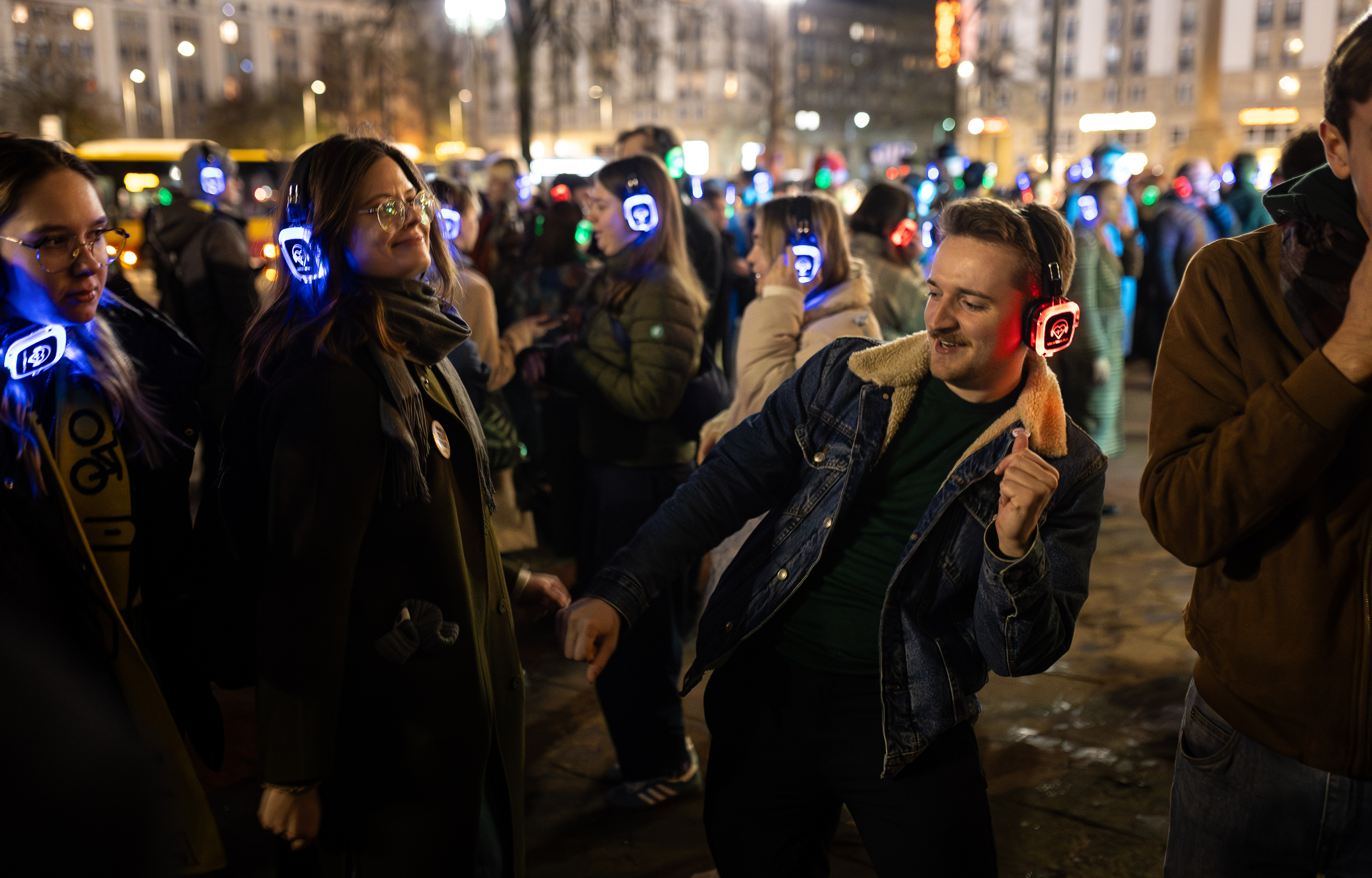
Silent disco party in Warsaw on April 3, 2024

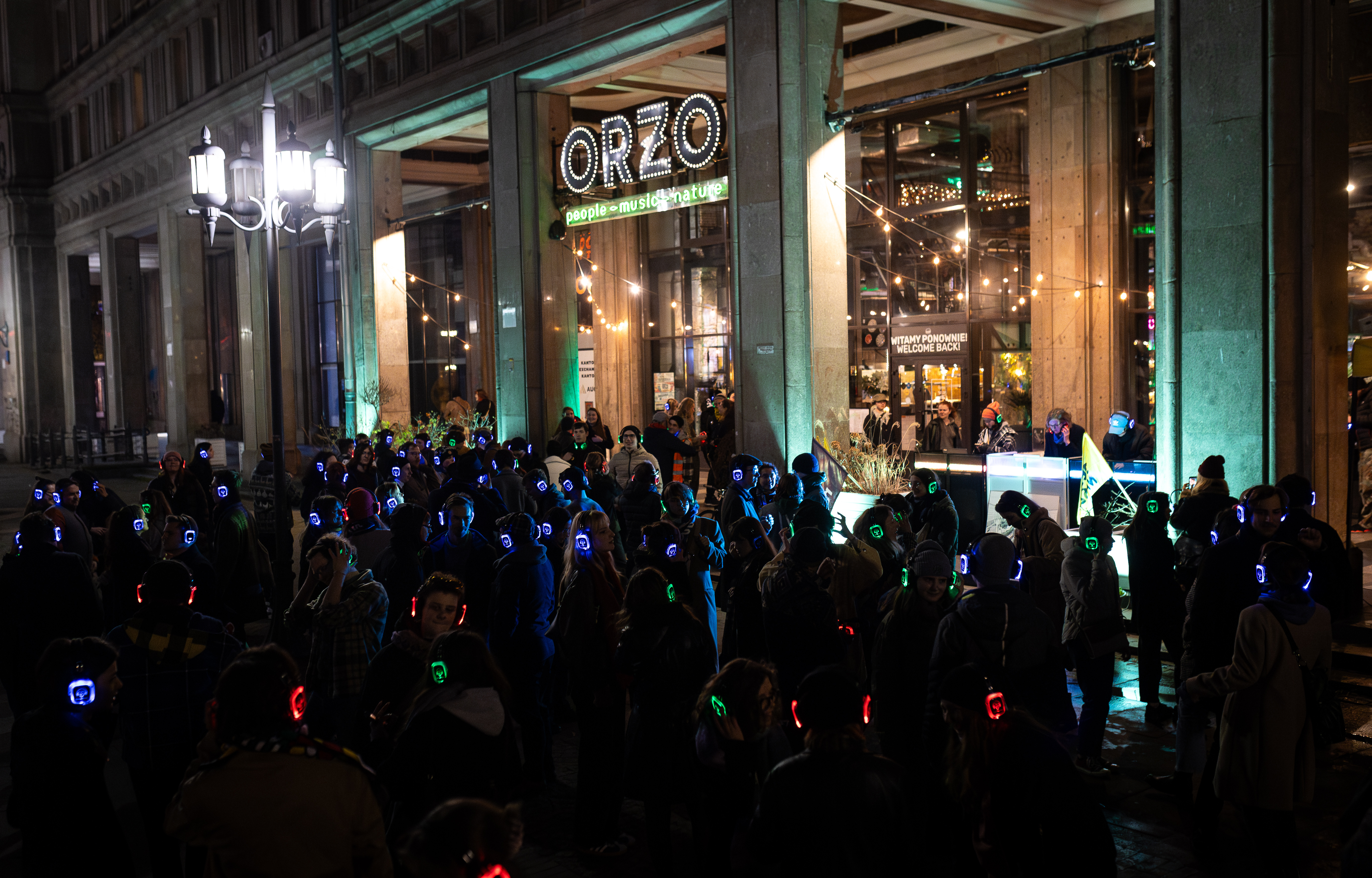
Silent disco party in Warsaw on April 3, 2024

A silent disco or silent rave is an event where people dance to music listened to on wireless headphones. Rather than using a speaker system, music is broadcast via a radio transmitter with the signal being picked up by wireless headphone receivers worn by the participants. Those without the headphones hear no music, giving the effect of a room full of people dancing to nothing.

In the earliest days of silent discos, before 2005, music was transmitted on a single channel. Later additional channels were introduced, each transmitting different music to the participants.

Silent discos are popular at music festivals as they allow dancing to continue past noise curfews. Similar events are "mobile clubbing" gatherings, where a group of people dance to the music on their personal music players.

A series of silent discos taking place in cathedrals and historic buildings around the UK and Europe was organised in 2024.

== History ==
A silent house party in San Francisco

An early reference in fiction is Astro Boy's 1967 Japanese science fiction story The Summer of 1993, where the titular character attends a party where everyone wears headphones. The 1969 Finnish film Time of Roses, set in 2012, contains a scene where couples are dancing with (wired) headphones in a quiet restaurant. One person without headphones reacts visibly when someone else removes theirs and for a moment music is heard before the user turns it off.

In 1994, the Glastonbury Festival linked its on-site radio station to the video screen sited next to the Main Stage, allowing festival goers to watch late night World Cup football and music videos on the giant screen after the sound curfew by using their own portable radios. The idea was the brainchild of the project manager from Proquip, who supplied the giant screen, and engineers from Moles recording studio in Bath, Somerset, who were working with Radio Avalon.

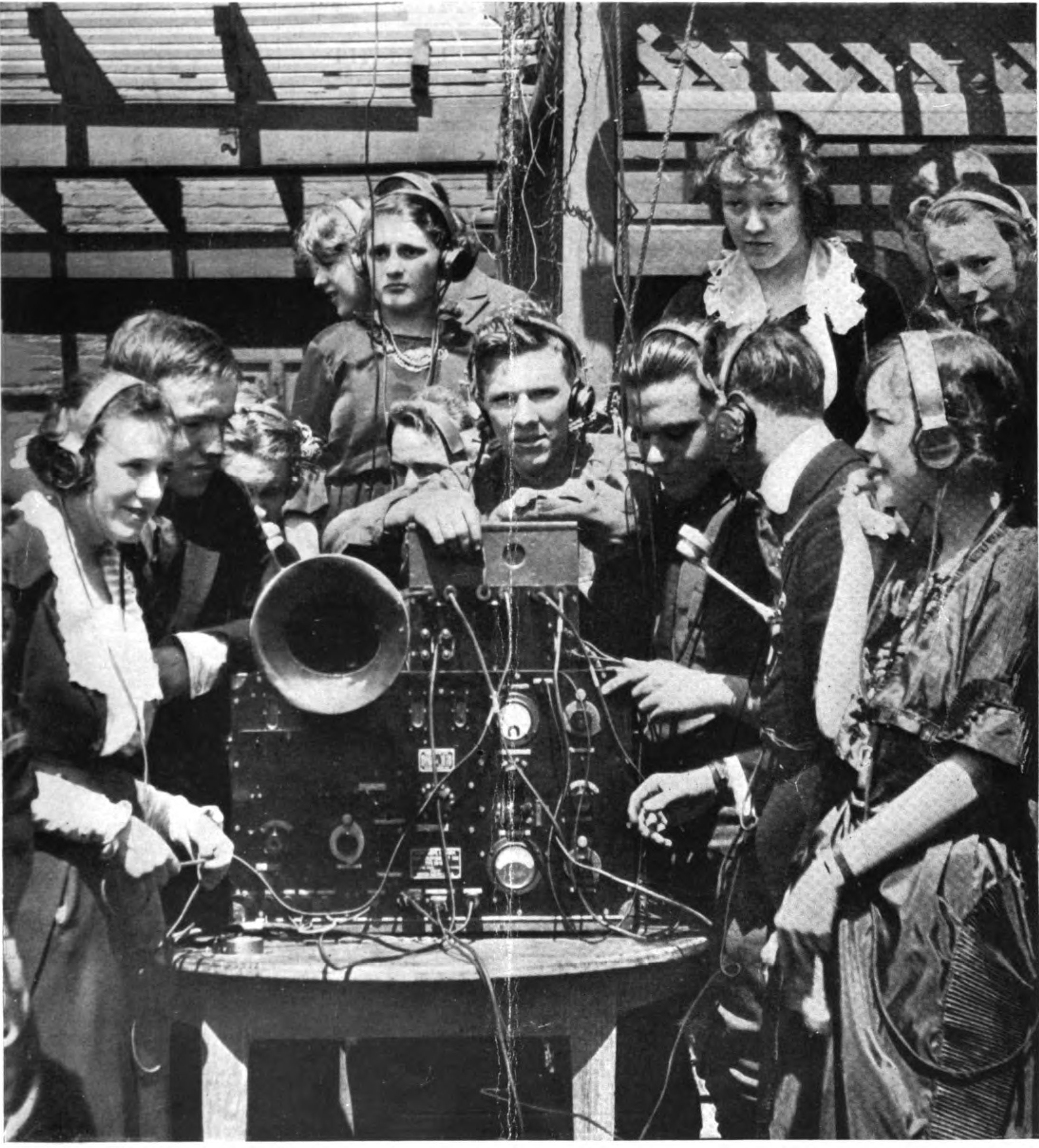
A 1920 "radiophone dance" held by an Atlanta social club: participants danced wearing earphones to music transmitted from a band across town.

In May 2000, BBC Live Music held a "silent gig" at Chapter Arts Centre in Cardiff, where the audience listened to a band, Rocketgoldstar, and various DJs through headphones.

In May 2002, artist Meg Duguid hosted Dance with me... a silent dance party at the Museum of Contemporary Art Chicago where she created an outdoor club installation complete with velvet ropes and glow rope in which a DJ spun a transmission to wireless headsets that audience members put on and danced to. Duguid threw a second dance party at the Museum of Contemporary Art, Chicago the following year, entitled Dueling DJs where two DJS simultaneously spun two separate musical transmissions various wireless headsets that audience members put on and danced to. This performance was repeated the following year (2004) at the Chicago Cultural Center.

The term "silent disco" has been in existence since at least 2005 with Bonnaroo Music Festival advertising such an event that year with DJ's Motion Potion, Quickie Mart and DJ medi4 and Koss headphones. The Oxford Dictionary Online added the term "silent disco" to their website in February 2011. As interest increased, more companies organize parties and provide events with wireless headphones. Some companies have offered home kits.

A series of silent discos taking place in cathedrals and historic buildings around the UK and Europe was organised in 2024; the event at Canterbury Cathedral, a religious building dating originally from 597, sold out within an hour, but caused controversy among people who considered that it belittled the sanctity of the house of prayer.

=== United States ===
HUSHconcerts (previously, Silent Frisco) was the first company to produce a multi-city Silent Disco tour in 2008 with Silent Soundclash kicking off at Winter Music Conference in Miami, followed by Atlanta, Athens, Savannah, Wilmington NC, Charlottesville Va, Baltimore, New York City, Syracuse, Pittsburgh and St. Louis. During this tour, the company became the first to produce American silent discos on a beach (Miami Beach) and a boat (the Rocksoff Cruise in New York Harbor).

Silent discos increased in popularity, and were depicted in television shows including NBC's Brooklyn Nine-Nine, season 2, episode 5 "The Mole"; Netflix's Atypical season 1, episode 8 "The Silencing Properties of Snow", and FX's comedy series "Dave" with American rapper Lil Dicky.

== Silent concert ==
A Flaming Lips poster promoting "The World's First Headphone Concerts"

A silent concert (or headphones concert) is a live music performance where the audience, in the same venue as the performing artist, listens to the music through headphones. The idea originated in 1997 when Erik Minkkinen, an electronic artist from Paris, streamed a live concert from his closet over the internet to three listeners in Japan. The concept led to a decentralized organization known as le placard ("the Cupboard"), which allowed anybody to establish a streaming or listening room.

The first headphone concert taking place in front of a live audience took place March 17, 1999, at Trees in Dallas, Texas. The American psychedelic band The Flaming Lips used an FM signal generator at the venue and handed out mini FM radio receivers and headphones to each member of the audience. A normal speaker system was also used so the sound could also be felt. This continued on their "International Music Against Brain Degeneration Revue" tour with mixed results, with technical problems including dead batteries and intoxicated audience members having trouble tuning to the correct frequency. Another headphone concert was performed in the Chapter Arts Centre, Cardiff in April 2000 by Rocketgoldstar.

Later headphone concerts used specially designed wireless 3-channel headphones, better in-house custom made transmitters and no speakers or any live PA in the venue. Major events hosting headphone concerts included the 2005 Glastonbury Festival, 2010 Shift Festival in Switzerland, the 2011-12 Van's Warp Tours across North America, Sensoria 2012 in Sheffield, UK, the 2012 Bonnaroo Music Festival in Tennessee and the Hoxeyville Music Fest in Michigan. In 2012, Kid Koala performed a "Space Cadet Headphone Concert tour" around the world.

A variant of the headphone concert involves live bands competing for the audience, who are able to choose which band's frequency to receive. In August 2008, the first silent Battle of the Bands was held at The Barfly music venue in Cardiff. The event featured bands going directly head-to-head, with a stage at each end of the venue, allowing gig-goers to choose which group they wished to listen to.

In 2013, Metallica performed live in Antarctica utilizing headphones instead of traditional concert amplification, due to concerns about harming the environment.

== Silent theatre ==
Theatre and performance companies are using silent disco technology as well. In 2009, with the help of SilentArena Ltd, Feral Productions began using an experimental approach – a mixture of narrative-led performance, sound art and guided exhibit. Their first performance, The Gingerbread House, took the audience from The Courtyard, Hereford on a journey through a multi-storey car park in the centre of Hereford. In 2010, their second show, Locked (Rapunzel’s Lament), took place in a children's playground, also in Hereford. Silent theatre techniques are now being used by companies in Liverpool, Birmingham and Glasgow.

In 2015 Lincoln Center staged a production of the Rocky Horror Picture Show utilizing Quiet Events Headphones, where an audience wearing headphones could switch between the audio for the live performance and the soundtrack of the film version being projected behind it. During the COVID-19 outbreak in 2020, in compliance with CDC guidelines, music events and theatre came to a halt. In the city of Scranton, however, the Scranton Fringe Festival found they could still follow through with their performances from behind the glass of empty store fronts by utilizing a local business, Silent Sound System, which allowed patrons to view safely from the sidewalks with the use of silent disco headphones. This event was dubbed "Fringe Under Glass." The Scranton Fringe Festival and Silent Sound System worked together previously to create a silent disco event and fundraiser in the Scranton Cultural Center, one of the city's oldest buildings. The "Fringe Silent Disco" was the most attended Scranton Fringe Festival event of 2019.

== Silent street shows ==
Street performers have used the concept as a solution to overcome bans on amplification and loudspeakers on the street. In 2016, Irish band Until April began using this for their shows on the street while touring in Germany and Switzerland.
