= Sweet Japonic =

Rock band

- Origin: Grand Rapids, Michigan, United States
- Genres: Roots rock, Soulful Roots Rock
- Years active: 2003–present
- Labels: Unsigned
- Members: Lucas Wilson, Matt Young, Sam Parks, Gabe Dutton, Roy Wallace
- Website: SweetJaponic.com

Sweet Japonic is a roots rock band from Grand Rapids, Michigan. Together they fuse blues, rock, folk, funk, and soul into eclectic rhythms that carry both an old flavor and new flair. Their 2006 second album Two O’clock Sirens earned a WYCE Jammie award for Best Rock Album, adding to the band’s previous Jammie for the 2005 release Through the Eyes of Lucie Blue.

Sweet Japonic has seen a boom in popularity since they were recently selected by Coca-Cola and Paste Magazine as one of 40 up-and-coming bands, and were featured on both Coke and Paste’s websites as part of their 'For the Love of Music' campaign. FreePlay Music Publishing (New York City, New York) signed the band to a publishing deal and several movies have requested to license their tracks in upcoming feature films.

== Members ==
- Lucas Wilson - Lead Vocals, Guitar
- Matt Young - Backing Vocals, Lead Guitar
- Sam Parks - Co-Lead Guitar,
- Gabe Dutton - Backing Vocals, Bass Guitar
- Roy Wallace - Drums, Backing Vocals
- Ryan Braman - Bass Guitar

== Past members ==
- Davy Tyson - keyboards, organ, backing vocals (still plays with the band from time to time)
- Ross Veldheer – drums
- Andy Weaver – lead guitar
- Karisa Wilson – backing vocals, violin

The band played their last show together on New Years 2010. The band and Lucas Wilson mutually decided to part ways. The remaining members are currently playing as the Sweet J Band and backing numerous other artists.

== Discography ==
=== Albums ===
Date of Release	Title	Label	Charting
2003	Front Porch EP		
2005	Through the Eyes of Lucie Blue		
2006	Two O'Clock Sirens		
November 22, 2007	Sweet Japonic Live		
2009	Where My Devils Go		
