= Rosin Coven =

American theatrical music ensemble

Rosin Coven is an American theatrical music ensemble that is considered part of the dark cabaret genre. They are based in San Francisco, California and are known for their participation in the annual Edwardian Ball, which is dedicated to both the Edwardian time period and the illustrator Edward Gorey.

== About ==
Rosin Coven's sound can be described as part of the dark cabaret movement, with strong jazz, rock, lounge, theatre and klezmer influences, amongst others. Most all of their music performed is original, with very occasional covers. For lack of a suitable genre, they came up with "Pagan Lounge Music," based on a mock business card that a friend created and handed to them at their very first backyard gig in Berkeley, California.

The band has become popular amongst many San Francisco subcultures, the most notable being devotees of the Edwardian Ball, a mini-festival based on the works of author/illustrator Edward Gorey and the Edwardian Era. They are also well known within the Burning Man crowd, having performed many times at the desert festival and at the San Francisco event known as Decompression.

Rosin Coven initially formed as a trio in San Francisco in 1996, and has performed regularly in the San Francisco area continuously ever since. They have made three albums: Penumbra, Live in the Pagan Lounge, and Menagerie.

== Founding ==
The band formed around Carrie Katz, née Davis (vocals, guitar and harp), Beth Vandervennet (cello), and Anastasia Emmons (violin). The core trio had a vision of amplified, sweeping strings accompanying driven lyrics. The three began a search for compatible musicians, primarily a drummer and bass player.

Working through friends and free ads in the San Francisco Guardian, the three found Patrick Kaliski and Justin Katz, who met in San Diego as students at UCSD and played together in other bands. Beth's summer work in a trio in Yellowstone Park required a substitute cellist, and Brian Bulkowski was brought in, but the added richness of a second cello lead to his assimilation.

The band's early works were primarily penned by Carrie Davis, with other members contributing. Songs were often orchestrated and improved collaboratively, leading to an eclectic mixture of sounds and songs.

Justin and Patrick lived in a warehouse in the "Jingletown" district of East Oakland, where other bands formed (notably YOU, a psychedelic space-rock band), and large parties were thrown on a regular basis. Rosin Coven's first gigs were at warehouse parties, although they quickly graduated to San Francisco's clubs, such as their first gig at the Hotel Utah. It was at this gig where they were scouted by Cafe du Nord's booking agent, which led to a series of performances at that club in the years to follow.

== Early years ==
Anastasia departed the band early, and the search was on for a new violinist. Andrea Walls, a veteran of San Francisco's rock and gypsy scene, joined the band, and the band gigged heavily in 1998 and 1999. Soon thereafter, a second female vocalist, Carri Abrahms, joined the band, adding operatically trained vocals and great depth to Rosin Coven's sound, as well as composing strong songs.

The band's first album, Penumbra, was recorded during this period, and the band's debut year at Burning Man was 1999.

San Francisco's live music scene was vibrant during this period, as the Dot-com bubble was in full swing. The band's mainstay club was Cafe du Nord, and they typically performed in elegant costumery with an emphasis on decor and set design.

The band expanded on its theatrical roots by creating and performing a live operetta, "Dream of the Scarab, A Beetle Bagatelle", which ran in sold-out glory for only four shows on one weekend at small black-box theater space called Venue 9. This exceptional experience prodded the band to greater emphasis on theatricality and costumes, in collaboration with visualist Ken Reeser who became the band's "visual alchemist".

== Expansion ==
2000 was a watershed year for Rosin Coven, with a one-month European tour primarily in the Netherlands, Germany, and the Czech Republic. The tour was repeated in 2001 with Poland and France added to the visited nations. Both the 2000 and 2001 tours included weekend gigging stints with the classic Czech rock band, Brutus. In 2002, financial strain of touring an eight-piece band led Rosin Coven to cut the tour to a week in New York City, where they played CBGB Gallery and the Flux Factory. Other than this period, the band has not toured extensively, primarily performing in the San Francisco area.

Two key forces were added - trombonist Tim Carless, and vibraphonist Tim O'Keefe. Violinist Andrea left the SF Bay area for Hawaii, and a new violinist was found in Lila Sklar, who shared many of the gypsy-inspired violin techniques, but with a heavier influence on jazz than rock.

Importantly, Carrie and Justin were married in late 2000, contributing to the stability of the band. Later, Tim Carless and Beth Vandervennet would marry as well, turning Rosin Coven into a decidedly family affair.

The album "Live in the Pagan Lounge" was compiled from live recordings around this period, primarily for sale on the short tours.

Rosin Coven's music found its way into a short film project by Yael Braha called, The Waves, which won an Eastman award. "Lion Song", from Penumbra, was heard on MTV's Big Brother, as well as in the Malcolm McDowell film, Dorian, a mediocre retelling of the Oscar Wilde novel.

The band's booking and management primarily became the responsibility of bassist Justin Katz, who co-founded Berkeley arts organization Epic Arts, and began organizing and promoting his own shows, often under the PARADOX Media name.

San Francisco's Edwardian Ball, celebrating both the Edwardian Period as well as writer and illustrator Edward Gorey, began in 2000 as PARADOX Media productions, initially at the Cat Club SF and as the event grew it was moved.

== Later ==
2004 saw several changes, as band members settled down. Lila Sklar had a daughter, while the two couples in the band, Carrie and Justin and Beth and Tim, had boys who were born within a week of each other. Carri Abrahms left the band during this period to pursue other projects.

Rosin Coven's music took even more theatrical turns, working with costumer and visual artist Gitty Duncan. Longer songs, such as the 20 minute song cycle "Train (A Vague Hunger)" created extended collaboration with local dance groups.

Band members Justin, Patrick, Tim and Espie formed a project called Dr. Abacus inspired by cartoon soundtracks, burlesque and 80's glam metal during this period with saxophonist John "Dr. Abacus" Schroeder. This was, in fact a sort of continuation of Schroeder, Justin and Patricks' seminal "YOU" band that recorded 3 studio albums, hosted outrageous art parties in their Oakland loft (where R.C. first performed) and toured the western U.S. including a tour van flipping and leaving Justin's upright bass in splinters and Patrick with his now famous "belly scar."

The album "Menagerie" was recorded early in this period, showing the band with a lusher and more mature tone. It featured original paintings by Craig LaRotonda of Revelation Art. Soon thereafter, family responsibilities slowed down the band's pace, but as the children have grown, the band is back on track with new material and even larger shows.

== Present-day ==
Rosin Coven continues to live and perform in the San Francisco area. Their biggest event of the year continues to be the Edwardian Ball, which has grown into a multi-city, multi-day event which in 2010 topped 4,000 in attendance. Since 2009 the Ball has been held at San Francisco's beautiful, historic Regency Center, with attendees traveling to the event from throughout the United States and from around the world, including Europe, South Africa, Japan, and the Middle East. They collaborate with their friends Vau de Vire Society, a San Francisco-based theatre-dance-circus troupe that co-create the show each year.
