= Jaenga =

Patrick Thomas McDevitt (born February 23, 1991), known professionally as Jaenga, is an American electronic music producer, DJ and filmmaker.

== Early life and education ==
Growing up in an Air Force family and moving around the world most of his young life, he attended the School of Visual Arts and was awarded the ASC Harris Savides Student Heritage Award.

== Career ==
After college Patrick focused on directing and shooting music and tour videos for musicians such as Lorde, Mt. Eden and Tristam. His work on "David Gahan and Soulsavers," was featured in Rolling Stone in December 2015. In October 2017 along with partner James Rogers-Gahan Patrick opened a film and photo studio in East Midtown, New York named Deer Studios NYC.

Patrick started his electronic music project, "Jaenga" in 2015, distinguishing himself in the festival circuit early, with his signature purple school bus and electrifying bass sounds. Jaenga and the “renegade bus” are renowned for hosting some of the biggest names in the electronic scene, attracting top talent such as Griz, Space Jesus, Eprom, Slushii, and Buku with its collaborative environment and creative energy. Joining the lineup of Electric Forest, and Camp Bisco, he has defined his live shows by immersing audiences in the world of Jaenga.

His new EP, Toulambi Tribe, released in the fall of 2018 on Zeds Dead's "Deadbeats" record label, featured the signature bass-heavy sounds and ambient soundscapes that have become synonymous with Jaenga. Taking inspiration from the ideologies of the Toulambi tribe, human technological syncretism, and his own nomadic spirit has enabled Jaenga to create a timely piece that accurately reflects and questions the current zeitgeist. Along with his EP, Deadbeats released a Jaenga remix of the Zeds Dead's track “Kill Em” in October 2018 alongside his single "Gold Rings" on an original Deadbeats compilation album.
