= Summer Camp Music Festival =

Annual festival in Chillicothe, Illinois

Coordinates: 40°53′35″N 89°30′10″W

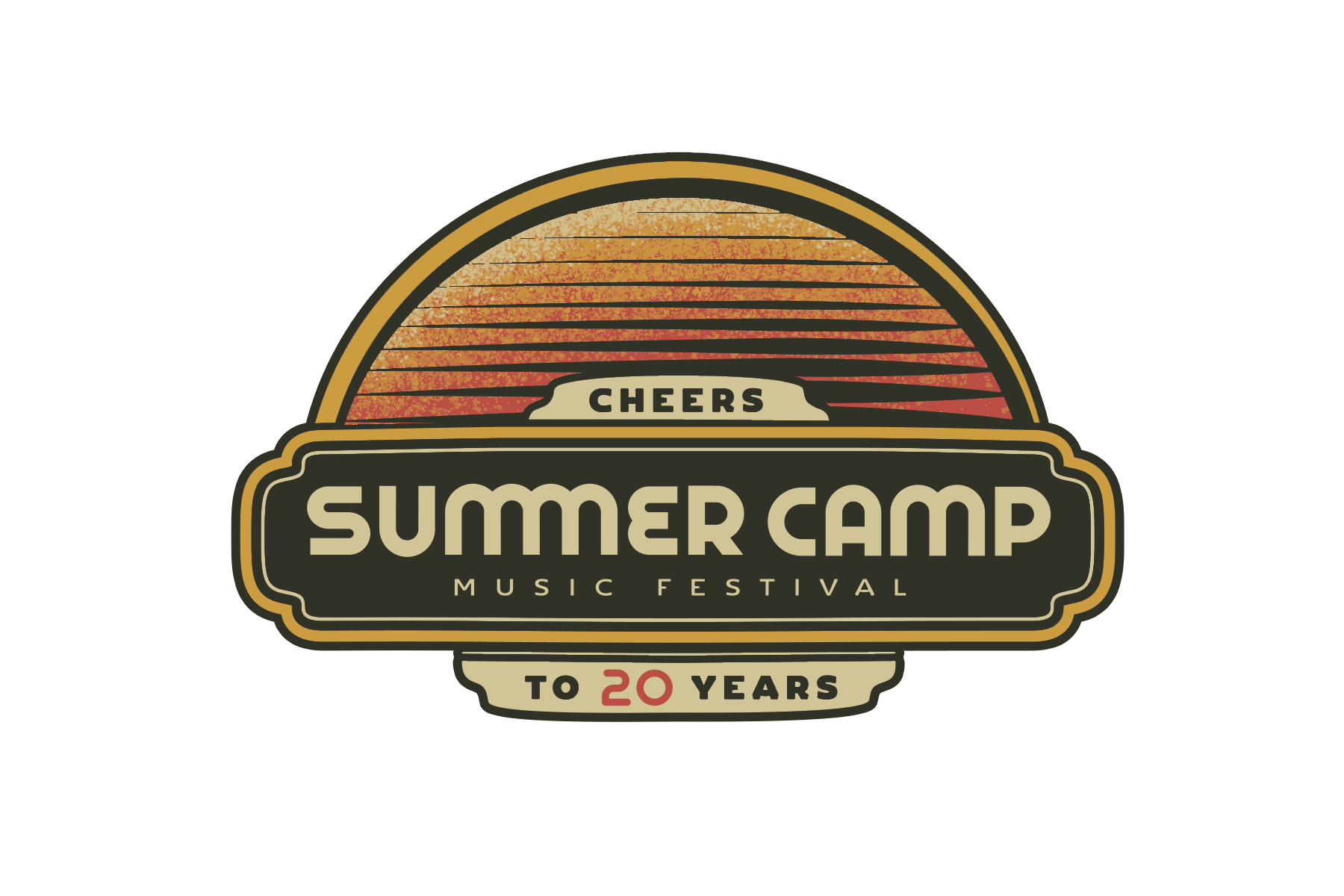
- 20th anniversary (2020–2021) logo
- Genre: Jam
- Dates: Memorial Day Weekend
- Location: Chillicothe, Illinois
- Years active: 2001–2019; 2021–2023
- Founders: Jay Goldberg Events & Entertainment
- Attendance: 20,000
- Website: summercampfestival.com

The Summer Camp Music Festival is a multi-day music festival created by Jay Goldberg Events & Entertainment and held annually on Memorial Day Weekend at Three Sisters Park in Chillicothe, Illinois. The event typically attracts around 20,000 visitors, of which between 8,000 and 10,000 arrive before gates open. In 2014, it was listed as one of the top 40 music festivals in Rolling Stone and in 2015 on Rolling Stone's 50 Must-See Music Festivals.

== Soulpatch ==
Soulpatch is a long-term, interactive garden space at Three Sisters Park. Experts have been providing education and answer questions about gardening at Summer Camp since 2014.

== Annual history ==
=== 2001 ===
The first annual Summer Camp Music Festival was held June 23–24, 2001. The initial event saw over 1,000 attendees. Twenty bands on 2 stages played for 2 days.

==== Line up, among others ====
- moe.
- əkoostik hookah
- Jacob Fred Jazz Odyssey
- The Samples
- JGB featuring Melvin Seals
- ulu
- The All Rectangle
- Blue Magoo
- Indiana Trip Factory
- Zea Mays
- Finger Lickin'

=== 2002 ===
The second annual Summer Camp Music Festival was held July 5–7, 2002.

==== Line up, among others ====
- moe.
- Cornmeal
- Jazz Mandolin Project
- Ekoostik Hookah
- Keller Williams
- ulu
- Blue Mangoo
- RANA
- Daily Bridge Club
- Patchouli
- Soul Slipper
- 1,000 Vertical Ft.
- Dexter Grove
- Finger Lickin'
- Green Mountain Grass
- Groovatron
- Zea Mays
- Bockman's Euphio
- Broken Grass

=== 2003 ===
The third annual Summer Camp Music Festival was held May 24–26, 2003. This year marked the first time Umphrey's McGee began playing at Summer Camp.

==== Line up, among others ====
- Drums & Tuba
- JACD w/ Johnny Neel and Derico Watson
- Umphrey's McGee
- Particle
- Karl Denson's Tiny Universe
- moe.
- Two Cow Garage
- Marc Broussard
- Donna the Buffalo
- The New Deal
- Oteil and the Peacemakers
- Keller Williams

=== 2004 ===
The fourth annual Summer Camp Music Festival was held May 28–30, 2004. This year, the festival expanded to 35 bands.

==== Line up, among others ====
- Particle
- Umphrey's McGee
- Medeski Martin & Wood
- Leftover Salmon
- moe.
- New Monsoon
- Tea Leaf Green
- Jeff Austin (of Yonder Mountain String Band)
- Family Groove Company
- Jim Donovan (of Rusted Root)
- Benevento Russo
- Antigone Rising
- Oteil and the Peacemakers
- Jazz Mandolin Project featuring Jon Fishman
- Keller Williams
- moe.
- Charlie Hunter Trio
- RAQ
- Mofro
- Jim Donovan (of Rusted Root)

=== 2005 ===
The fifth annual Summer Camp Music Festival was held May 26–29, 2005. This year featured over 40 bands. The 2005 event also featured a “Playground Kids Camp” area with arts, crafts and games, including water balloons, hair wraps, face painting, and other activities.

==== Line up, among others ====
- New Monsoon
- RAQ
- Particle
- Donna the Buffalo
- Keller Williams
- moe.
- Euforquestra
- Backyard Tire Fire
- Michael Franti & Spearhead
- Umphrey's McGee
- Hot Buttered Rum String Band
- Mofro
- The Hackensaw Boys
- Family Groove Company
- The Reverend Peyton's Big Damn Band
- Oteil and the Peacemakers
- Jazz Mandolin Project
- Victor Wooten Band
- Jeff Coffin Mutet
- Jazz Mandolin Project with *Oteil and the Peacemakers

=== 2006 ===
The sixth annual Summer Camp Music Festival was held May 25–27, 2006.

- moe.
- Umphrey’s McGee
- Keller Williams
- Rusted Root
- Yonder Mountain String Band
- The Disco Biscuits
- Honkytonk Homeslice featuring Billy Nershi
- Andrew Bird
- Oteil and the Peacemakers
- Zilla featuring Michael Travis
- Chris Berry & Panjea featuring Michael Kang
- Apollo Sunshine
- New Monsoon
- ALO (Animal Liberation Orchestra)
- Vince Herman
- Tea Leaf Green
- RAQ
- Rose Hill Drive
- Pnuma Trio
- Glenn Kotche (of Wilco)
- The Lee Boys
- Backyard Tire Fire
- Reverend Peyton's Big Damn Band
- The Brakes
- Family Groove Company
- Brothers Past
- The Steepwater Band
- Future Rock

=== 2007 ===
The seventh annual Summer Camp Music Festival was held May 24–27, 2007.

==== Line up, among others ====
- Tea Leaf Green
- Assembly of Dust
- ALO (Animal Liberation Orchestra)
- Keller Williams and the WMDs
- Umphrey's McGee
- moe.
- Family Groove Company
- Reverend Peyton's Big Damn Band
- Assembly of Dust
- Oteil and the Peacemakers
- The Brakes
- Great American Taxi
- Les Claypool
- Pnuma Trio
- Al and the Transamericans
- Toubab Krewe
- Melissa Ferrick
- New Monsoon
- Galactic
- Medeski Martin & Wood
- Brothers Past
- The Wood Brothers
- Hot Buttered Rum
- Backyard Tire Fire
- Tag Team - Constantly changing band composed of members of Umphrey's McGee, Moe, and Tea Leaf Green. Band members would "tag" each other when they wanted to switch out with someone playing on stage.

=== 2008 ===
The 2008 Summer Camp Music Festival was held May 23–25.

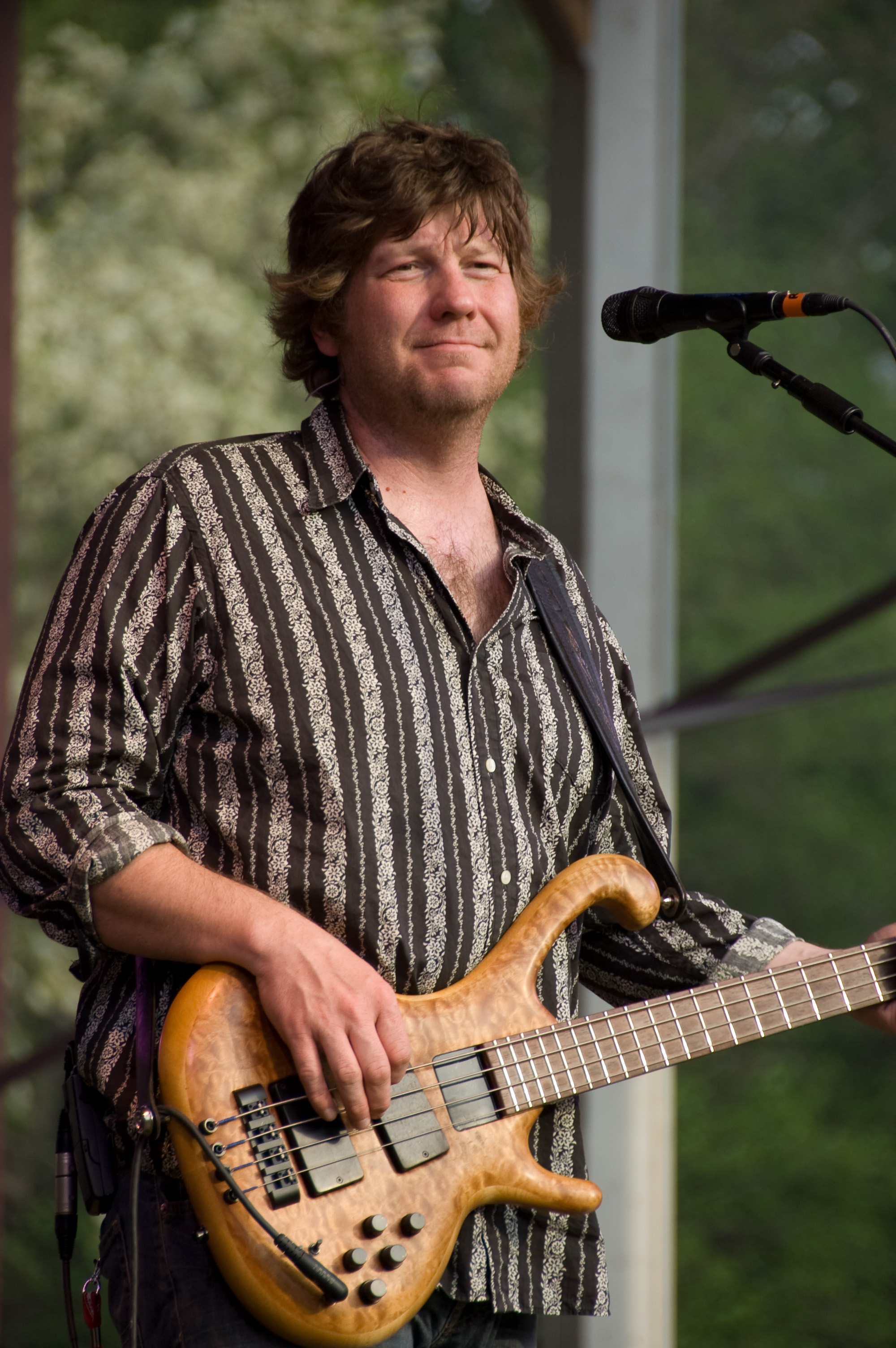
Rob Derhak of Moe, 2008 Summer Camp

- moe.
- Umphrey's McGee
- The Flaming Lips
- O.A.R.
- The Roots
- G. Love & Special Sauce
- The New Pornographers
- STS9
- George Clinton & Parliament Funkadelic
- Tea Leaf Green
- Clutch
- Blind Melon
- Girl Talk
- The Avett Brothers
- Cornmeal
- Hot Buttered Rum
- The Lee Boys
- Lotus
- Family Groove Company
- Euforquestra
- Future Rock
- Banyan
- Moon Taxi
- Backyard Tire Fire

=== 2009 ===
The 2009 Summer Camp Music Festival was held May 21–24, 2009. Over 10,000 people attended.

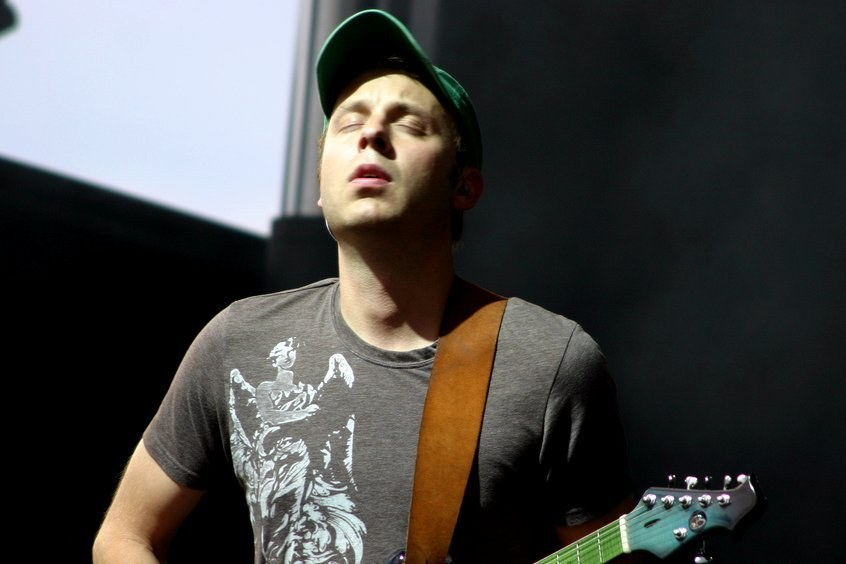
Jack Cinninger of Umphrey's McGee, 2009 Summer Camp

==== Line up, among others ====
- moe.
- Umphrey's McGee
- Willie Nelson
- Method Man & Redman
- Keller Williams
- Les Claypool
- Medeski Scofield Martin & Wood
- Girl Talk
- Gomez
- Darkstar Orchestra
- Los Lobos
- Buckethead
- Lotus
- Bassnectar
- That 1 Guy
- The Wood Brothers
- EOTO
- Cornmeal
- Junior Brown
- Family Groove Company
- Assembly of Dust
- Easy Star All Stars
- Backyard Tire Fire
- Moonalice
- Toubab Krewe
- Brainchild
- The Bridge
- Secret Chiefs 3
- Public Property
- Greensky Bluegrass
- Yamn

=== 2010 ===
The 10th annual Summer Camp Music Festival was held May 28–30, 2010. The event featured 55 bands on 5 stages.

==== Line up, among others ====
- moe.
- Umphrey's McGee
- Sound Tribe Sector Nine
- Gov't Mule
- The Avett Brothers
- Keller Williams
- Slightly Stoopid
- Backyard Tire Fire
- Family Groove Company
- Bassnectar
- G. Love & Special Sauce
- Rebelution
- Split Lip Rayfield
- That 1 Guy
- The Bridge
- EOTO
- Cornmeal
- Zappa Plays Zappa
- Pretty Lights
- Steel Pulse
- Victor Wooten
- Railroad Earth
- Future Rock
- Animal Liberation Orchestra
- The Hood Internet
- The New Mastersounds
- Dumpstaphunk
- Hot Buttered Rum
- My Dear Disco
- Kinetix
- The Ragbirds
- Zach Deputy
- Dangermuffin

=== 2011 ===
The 11th annual Summer Camp Music Festival was held May 27–29, 2011.

==== Line up, among others ====
- moe.
- Umphrey's McGee
- Widespread Panic
- STS9
- Bassnectar
- The Avett Brothers
- Girl Talk
- Yonder Mountain String Band
- Bela Fleck & The Flecktones
- Bruce Hornsby & the Noisemakers
- Keller Williams
- Slightly Stoopid
- Wiz Khalifa
- Skrillex
- EOTO
- Cornmeal
- Big Gigantic
- SOJA
- 7 Walkers
- The Wood Brothers
- The New Mastersounds
- Tea Leaf Green
- Mimosa
- BoomBox
- Daedelus
- Family Groove Company
- Future Rock
- The Werks
- Gaelic Storm
- Greensky Bluegrass
- Rebirth Brass Band
- The Mother Hips
- The Pimps of Joytime
- Ryan Montbleau Band
- Paper Diamond
- The Ragbirds
- Orgone
- Euforquestra
- The Reverend Peyton's Big Damn Band
- My Dear Disco
- Dirtfoot
- Truth & Salvage Co.
- Keys N Krates
- The Giving Tree Band
- Van Ghost

=== 2012 ===
The 12th annual Summer Camp Music Festival was held May 25–27, 2012.

==== Line up, among others ====
- moe.
- Umphrey's McGee
- Jane's Addiction
- Pretty Lights
- Primus
- Common
- Gov't Mule
- Tedeschi Trucks Band
- Gogol Bordello
- Zeds Dead
- Michael Franti & Spearhead
- Yonder Mountain String Band
- Shpongle
- EOTO
- Keller Williams
- Rebelution
- Leftover Salmon
- Galactic
- Cornmeal
- 12th Planet
- Ozomatli
- Victor Wooten
- Sierra Leone's Refugee All Stars
- Preservation Hall Jazz Band
- BoomBox
- Gaelic Storm
- Devil Makes Three
- Dirty Dozen Brass Band
- Future Rock
- Greensky Bluegrass
- Kids These Days
- The Infamous Stringdusters
- Gramatik
- Anders Osborne
- Orgone
- Hot Buttered Rum
- Family Groove Company
- The Ragbirds
- Sister Sparrow & the Dirty Birds
- AraabMuzik
- The Lumineers
- Rubblebucket
- Van Ghost
- DJ Solo
- JC Brooks & the Uptown Sound
- Red Wanting Blue
- Banyan
- Flinch
- Stratus
- Kinetix
- The Giving Tree Band
- Chester Brown
- Tauk
- David Gans
- Caravan of Thieves
- Tribal Seeds
- Elsinore
- The Steepwater Band
- Mathien

=== 2013 ===
The 13th annual Summer Camp Music Festival was held on May 24–26, 2013. Attendance was approximately 13,000.

==== Line up, among others ====
- moe.
- Umphrey's McGee
- Trey Anastasio Band
- STS9
- The Avett Brothers
- Thievery Corporation
- Zeds Dead
- Big Gigantic
- Yonder Mountain String Band
- Medeski Martin & Wood
- Diplo
- EOTO
- Big Boi
- Gramatik
- Paper Diamond
- North Mississippi Allstars
- The Wailers
- Cornmeal
- Lettuce
- Future Rock
- Victor Wooten
- Dumpstaphunk
- The M Machine
- Savoy
- Alvin Risk
- The Wood Brothers
- Tokimonsta
- Tea Leaf Green
- Van Ghost
- The Soul Rebels
- John Brown's Body
- Maps and Atlases
- Minnesota
- Everyone Orchestra
- Liquid Stranger
- Family Groove Company
- The Werks
- Cherub
- Giant Panda Guerilla Dub Squad
- Filligar
- The Reverend Peyton's Big Damn Band
- The Giving Tree Band
- Caravan of Thieves
- The Ragbirds
- Gangstagrass
- The 4onthefloor
- Roster McCabe
- Miss A
- Tauk
- Aqueous
- Swear and Shake
- James Wallace & the Naked Light

=== 2014 ===
The 14th annual Summer Camp Music Festival was held on May 23–25, 2014.

==== Line up, among others ====
- moe.
- Umphrey's McGee
- Zac Brown Band
- Bassnectar
- Trey Anastasio Band
- Primus
- Slightly Stoopid
- Girl Talk
- Yonder Mountain String Band
- Lotus
- Gramatik
- Wolfgang Gartner
- EOTO
- Blues Traveler
- Matisyahu
- G. Love & Special Sauce
- Wild Adriatic
- Lettuce
- Everyone Orchestra
- Beats Antique
- Bro Safari
- The M Machine
- Victor Wooten Band
- Future Rock
- Koan Sound
- Blackberry Smoke
- The Devil Makes Three
- Greensky Bluegrass
- Cherub
- The Wood Brothers
- Groundation
- The Motet
- Family Groove Company
- Green Lantern
- Dawn of Midi
- Orgone
- The Ragbirds
- Van Ghost
- Brainchild
- Swear and Shake
- The London Souls
- Funk Trek
- Filibusta

=== 2015 ===
The 15th annual Summer Camp Music Festival was held on May 22–24, 2015.

==== Line up, among others ====
- moe.
- Umphrey's McGee
- Steve Miller Band
- Widespread Panic
- Sound Tribe Sector 9
- Big Gigantic
- John Butler Trio
- Paul Oakenfold
- Cherub
- Future Rock
- The Infamous Stringdusters
- Joe Russo's Almost Dead
- Trampled By Turtles
- American Aquarium
- Family Groove Company
- KOA
- North American Scum
- Trigger Hippy
- Turnpike Troubadors

=== 2016 ===
The 16th annual Summer Camp Music Festival was held on May 27–29, 2016.

==== Line up, among others ====
- moe.
- Umphrey's McGee
- Big Grizmatik
- Mudcrutch
- Lotus
- Louis the Child
- NGHTMRE
- Sam Feldt
- Savoy
- Snails
- The Wailers
- Filibusta
- Liquid Stranger
- Manic Focus
- Mija
- The Russ Liquid Test
- Sunsquabi
- Twiddle
- The Werks
- Tauk
- Ani DiFranco
- Lil Dicky

=== 2017 ===
The 17th annual Summer Camp Music Festival was held on May 26–28, 2017.

==== Line up, among others ====
- moe.
- Umphrey's McGee
- Pretty Lights
- Trey Anastasio
- Zeds Dead
- A Tribe Called Red
- Waka Flocka
- Primus
- Gov't Mule
- Run the Jewels
- Disco Biscuits
- gramatik
- Mike Gordon
- The Claypool Lennon Delirium
- Destructo
- EOTO
- Everyone Orchestra
- The Floozies
- Ganja White Night
- GTA
- Herobust
- Hippie Sabotage
- The Infamous Stringdusters
- Keller Williams Kwhatro
- Kyle Hollingsworth Band
- Laith Al-Saadi
- Manic Focus
- Nahko and Medicine for the People
- Railroad Earth
- Rezz
- Slander

=== 2018 ===
The 18th annual Summer Camp Music Festival was held on May 24–27, 2018.

==== Line up, among others ====
- moe.
- Umphrey's McGee
- Phil Lesh and the Terrapin Family Band
- Diplo
- Slightly Stoopid
- Cypress Hill
- STS9
- Tipper
- RL Grime
- Tycho
- Greensky Bluegrass
- Action Bronson
- Beats Antique
- Cherub
- EOTO
- Everyone Orchestra
- Guster
- Jai Wolf
- JJ Grey & Mofro
- John Medeski's Mad Skillet
- Keller Williams
- Keys N Krates
- Kyle Hollingsworth Band
- Leftover Salmon
- Lettuce
- Liquid Stranger
- Los Lobos
- Marco Benevento
- The Motet
- Ookay Live
- Opiuo
- Papadosio
- Pigeons Playing Ping Pong
- SOJA
- Spafford
- Tokimonsta
- Twiddle
- Victor Wooten Trio featuring Dennis Chambers & Bob Franceschini
- Yonder Mountain String Band
- Z-Trip
- Zomboy
- Aqueous
- Big Something
- Brandon "Taz" Niederauer
- Break Science
- Chicago Farmer
- Cofresi
- The Commonheart
- Con Brio
- Dirt Monkey
- Ducky
- Eliot Lipp
- Family and Friends
- Filibusta
- Fre3kbass and the Bump Assembly featuring Sammi Garett of Turkuaz
- The Funk Hunters
- Future Rock
- GG Magree
- Graves
- Henhouse Prowlers
- Horseshoes & Hand Grenades
- Jade Cicada
- Jason Huber DJ Set
- Joe Hertler & The Rainbow Seekers
- Joe Marcinek Band
- Kung Fu
- Kuuro
- Lawrence
- Led Zeppelin 2
- Lee DeWyze
- Mad Zach
- Maddy O'Neal
- The Main Squeeze
- Marvel Years
- Michael Menert & the Pretty Fantastics
- Mija
- Mike Dillon's Punk Rock Percussion Consortium
- Monophonics
- Nikki Lane
- Old Salt Union
- Old Shoe
- Parker
- Parsonsfield
- Pink Talking Fish
- Probcause
- Protoje
- Reo Cragun
- Roosevelt Collier
- Shlump
- SoDown
- Split Lip Rayfield
- Steady Flow
- Subtronics
- Sun Stereo
- Tauk
- Tyler Childers
- The Werks
- Zeke Beats
- Zoogma

=== 2019 ===
The 19th annual Summer Camp Music Festival was held on May 24–26, 2019.

==== Line up, among others ====
- moe.
- Umphrey’s McGee
- Ben Harper & The Innocent Criminals
- Big Gigantic
- STS9
- Zeds Dead
- Rebelution
- Chromeo (Live)
- Oteil and Friends
- Gramatik
- Flux Pavilion
- Black Star
- Lotus
- Trampled By Turtles
- Blues Traveler
- Toots and the Maytals
- 30db
- Bonnie X Clyde
- Borgore
- Break Science
- Bro Safari
- Chris Robinson Brotherhood
- Cory Wong (of Vulfpeck)
- Doom Flamingo
- EOTO
- Everyone Orchestra
- Future Rock
- Here Come The Mummies
- Karl Denson’s Tiny Universe
- Keller Williams’ Pettygrass Ft The Hillbenders
- Manic Focus
- Papadosio
- Pigeons Playing Ping Pong
- Pnuma (Live)
- Rob Garza (of Thievery Corporation)
- Shiba San
- Soul Rebels, The
- Space Jesus
- Spafford
- Squnto
- Sunsquabi
- Svdden Death
- TAUK
- Tokimonsta
- Too Many Zooz
- Yonder Mountain String Band
- Allie Kral WSG Pine Travelers
- ALO
- Andy Frasco & The U.N.
- Aqueous
- Arlo McKinley & The Lonesome Sound
- Artifakts
- Brandon “Taz” Niederauer
- Brass Against
- Chicago Farmer
- Cofresi
- Cycles
- Dirtwire
- Eprom
- Exmag Fate Nite Ft Brendan Bayliss & Jeremy Salken
- Ghost Light Funk You
- GoodSex
- Goose Govinda
- Horseshoes and Hand Grenades
- J. Worra
- Jason Huber
- Jeff Austin Band
- Junkyard Samurai
- Los Colognes
- Maddy O'Neal
- Mersiv
- Mihali (of Twiddle)
- Mikaela Davis
- Mungion
- Nobide
- Old Shoe
- Prophet Massive
- Ray Volpe
- Russ Liquid
- Slumberjack
- SoDown
- Southern Avenue
- Steady Flow
- Sun Stereo
- Tropidelic
- um..
- Victory
- We Banjo 3
- Werks, The
- Willie Waldman w/ Vinnie, Chuck & Friends
- Yultron
- Yung Bae
- Aaron Kamm & the One Drops
- Alison Hanna
- Amo Amo
- Aquila
- Audiodacity
- BareFuzz
- Blastfome
- Blind Colors
- BluePrint Metro
- Brainchild
- Butta'
- Chicago Afrobeat Project
- Comisar
- The Commonheart,
- Crosseyed & Phishless
- D Webb
- Dawn, The
- Dearie
- Dirty Revival
- Dizgo
- DJ Belly
- DJ Tim Williams
- Dog City Disco
- Driftwood
- Easy Riders
- Edward David Anderson’s Black Dirt Revival
- Electric Orange Peel
- Eminence Ensemble
- Family Groove Company
- Guerrilla Theory
- Head for the Hills
- Hollow Down
- Hyryder
- Ifdakar
- Illy Wonka & Friends
- Jake The Plug
- Johnny Bhive
- Kolla
- Krushendo
- lespecial
- Loose Loose
- Lunar Ticks
- Memba
- The Mighty Pines
- Mike Maimone
- Modern Measure
- Montu
- Neal Francis
- The North 41
- The People Brothers Band
- PhanieRae & the Soul Shakers
- Pine Travelers
- PLS&TY
- Porn and Chicken
- Positive Vibr8ions
- Reggae Rapids
- Ridgeracer
- The Ries Brothers
- Sixth Street Brass
- SJOD
- Statik
- Still Shine
- Sun Beard
- Tenth Mountain Division
- TrailHeads
- The Tripp Brothers
- Trouble Chasin’
- Zoofunkyou
- 40 People
- Aathee
- Angel Zamudio
- AP010
- Arvii Mala b2b Alex Kislov ft MGabriel x Violin Girl
- Bobby DeMaria
- Boots & Claps
- DangerWayne
- DJ BJ
- Doc Pearson
- Elucktro
- Fahrenheit and Celsius
- Haleigh Haus
- Jodah b2b Culture
- John Lynx
- LWKY
- Nikho
- Plaid Hawaii
- Richie Olivo
- Surrounded by Owls
- Tripnotic
- Tsunami
- Vincent R
- Zenas White
- Zpacely

=== 2020 ===
The 2020 event was slated for May 22–24, 2020. It was rescheduled to August 21–23, 2020 due to the COVID-19 pandemic. Officials decided to cancel the 2020 festival due to the COVID-19 pandemic. The 20th festival was deferred to August 2021.

=== 2021 ===
The 20th annual Summer Camp Music Festival was held on August 20–22, 2021. This event had over 25,000 attendees, its highest attendance. The Illumination Woods, a new experiential art area with psychedelic art installations, was a new attraction at the 2021 event. It also hosted the 10th annual Field Day, an annual color war where teams competed in tug-of-war, giant Twister, dodgeball, eating contests, and other competitions. The indoor events at the Red Barn were cancelled due to the ongoing COVID-19 pandemic.

==== Line up, among others ====
- moe.
- Umphrey’s McGee
- Ween
- Billy Strings
- Three 6 Mafia
- GRIZ
- Rezz
- STS9
- Tipper
- Dirty Heads
- Subtronics
- The Wood Brothers
- Houndmouth
- The Floozies
- Lettuce
- Cherub
- Manic Focus
- Emancipator
- CloZee
- Boogie T
- Twiddle
- Scarypoolparty
- LSDream
- Whipped Cream
- Spafford
- Yonder Mountain String Band
- Here Come the Mummies
- Andy Frasco & The U.N.
- Aqueous
- Boogie T.rio
- BoomBox
- Break Science
- Cycles
- Death Kings (Ryan Stasik, Mike Gantzer and Mikey Carubba)
- Detox Unit
- Doom Flamingo
- Dopapod
- Everyone Orchestra
- Ghost-Note
- Horseshoes & Hand Grenades
- Karina Rykman
- Keller Williams
- KellerSquabi
- Lawrence
- lespecial
- Maddy O'Neal
- Maggie Rose
- Marvel Years
- MonoNeon
- Mungion
- Papadosio
- Ryan Montbleau
- Saxsquatch
- Southern Avenue
- Sunsquabi
- The Werks
- Chicago Farmer & The Field Notes
- Chomppa
- Cofresi
- Consider the Source
- Dogma
- Family Groove Company
- Fate Nite ft. Brendan Bayliss + Friends
- Filibusta
- Funk You
- GoodSex
- The Jauntee
- Joe Hertler and the Rainbow Seekers
- Jon Stickley Trio
- Kitchen Dwellers
- Lee Dewyze
- LTX
- Marcus Rezak’s Shred is Dead
- Mike Dillon and Punkadelic
- Mize
- Old Shoe
- Porn and Chicken
- Red Wanting Blue
- Rev Jeff Mosier
- Sicard Hollow
- Steady Flow
- Sun Beard
- Tropidelic
- Alison Hanna Band
- The Althea Grace Band
- APO10
- Audiodacity
- Backyard Tire Fire
- Badman
- Barefuzz
- DJ Belly
- Berth
- Biomassive
- BluePrint Metro
- Bones Jugs
- Brainchild
- Chemical Safari
- D Webb
- D'arcy
- Daniel Rodriguez
- Dark Moon Hollow
- The Dawn
- Dizgo
- EGi
- Electric Orange Peel
- Fall Classic
- Fletcher’s Grove
- Float Like a Buffalo
- Funkstatik
- FUX
- Guerrilla Theory
- The Iceman Special
- Ifdakar
- Jack Cloonan Band
- Joslyn and the Sweet Compression
- JUULS VERNE
- KVZ
- Levity
- Little Stranger
- Magnolia Boulevard
- Medusa
- MK Ultra
- MO & WWP
- Nicholas Gerlach
- The North 41
- Positive Vibr8ions
- Pushing Daisy’s Band
- The Ries Brothers
- The Rockstar DJ Tre
- Since JulEYE
- Still Shine
- Stormy Chromer
- Sugar Lime Blue
- DJ Tim Williams
- The Textures
- Thee Delinquents
- Timmy Two Times
- Travers Brothership
- The Tripp Brothers
- Trouble Chasin’
- TruFeelz
- Undercover Organism
- Victoria Canal
- Vine
- Vintage Pistol
- WokeZan
- Yam Yam
- ZOSKA

=== 2022 ===
The 21st annual Summer Camp Music Festival was held on May 27–29, 2022.

==== Line up, among others ====
- Umphrey’s McGee
- moe.
- The Smashing Pumpkins
- Zeds Dead
- Big Gigantic
- Joe Russo’s Almost Dead
- Little Feat
- STS9
- NGHTMRE
- Liquid Stranger
- Big Wild
- Bone Thugs-N-Harmony
- Shpongle (Simon Postford Live Set)
- Pigeons Playing Ping Pong
- Whethan
- Cory Wong
- Cherub
- Malaa
- Moon Taxi
- Peekaboo
- Manic Focus
- OPIUO
- SNBRN
- Kasbo
- DJ PAUL
- Keller Williams’ Grateful Grass
- The Infamous Stringdusters
- Leftover Salmon
- Yonder Mountain String Band
- The Motet
- Victor Wooten
- Here Come The Mummies
- Magic City Hippies
- Cory Henry
- Andy Frasco & The U.N.
- TAUK
- Everyone Orchestra
- 1788-L
- Aqueous
- Balkan Bump
- Big Something
- BlueStar Radiation
- Cofresi
- Daily Bread
- Death Kings
- Dirt Monkey
- Doom Flamingo
- Dopapod
- DRAMA
- Ghost Light
- Hannah Wicklund
- Jantsen
- Jason Leech
- Jimkata
- lespecial
- Maddy O'Neal
- Maggie Rose
- Magic Beans
- The Main Squeeze
- Marcus Rezak’s Shred Is Dead
- Mersiv
- Monophonics
- Montell2099
- Moore Kismet
- Mungion
- Ravenscoon
- Sammy Rae & The Friends
- Saxsquatch
- SoDown
- Steady Flow
- SUSTO
- Wavedash
- The Werks
- Wreckno
- A Hundred Drums
- Aaron Kamm & The One Drops
- BLVK JVCK
- Caleb Johnson
- Canabliss
- Chicago Farmer & The Fieldnotes
- The Claudettes
- Con Brio
- Couch
- DOGMA
- Dogs In A Pile
- Family Groove Company
- Goodnight, Texas
- GoodSex
- The Horn Section
- James Maslow x Eugene Ugorski
- Kick The Cat
- Kitchen Dwellers
- Little Bird
- Little Stranger
- Lowdown Brass Band
- Mac Saturn
- Mikaela Davis
- Mike Dillon’s Punkadelick
- Neighbor
- The North 41
- Old Shoe
- Sun Stereo
- TK & The Holy Know-Nothings
- Yam Yam
- Able Grey
- Afro D and Global Soundwaves
- Alison Hanna Band
- APO10
- Arkansauce
- Armchair Boogie
- Audiodacity
- Azazel
- BareFuzz
- DJ BELLY
- Biomassive
- Booth Blues with Anika Emily
- BooThangs
- Brainchild
- BrentJames360
- Butta'
- Catdaddy's Funky Fuzz-Bunker Band
- Charlie Otto + His Gear
- Corduroy Xavier
- The Dawn
- Dead Inside
- Debstep
- Dizgo
- Dustin Smith & the Daydreamers
- The Earthlings
- Eggy
- Electric Orange Peel
- Fauvely
- Fine By Me
- Formerly The Fox
- Heads In Motion
- The Hillbenders
- Hot Brown Smackdown
- Humans and Strangers
- Ifdakar
- Intoxicated Zen
- Jack Cloonan
- Jesse Clayton
- John Welton & the Awakening
- Kangaroo Court
- Kendall Street Company
- Kuh Nives
- LOA
- MEDUSA
- MELD
- Miles Over Mountains
- MOTLEY FLOWER
- MZG
- Niniboi
- Of Good Nature
- Pajamas
- Phyphr
- Pine Travelers
- Positive Vibr8ions
- Recycled Funk
- The Runaway Grooms
- Since JulEYE
- The Skinny
- Stan P Band
- Stiky
- Still Shine
- Tand
- Tenth Mountain Division
- The Textures
- DJ Tim Williams
- Trash Angel
- Trifocal
- The Tripp Brothers
- TRØLL
- Trouble Chasin’
- Troubleshoota
- Vincent Antone
- Vintage Pistol
- Willie Waldman Project
- DJ ZAY
- Zoofunkyou
- zoska

=== 2023 ===
The 22nd annual Summer Camp Music Festival was held on May 25–28, 2023. Goldberg announced the 2023 festival would be the last, as the event in its past incarnation would go on hiatus. Goldberg cited competition from other festivals, supply chain issues, sourcing labor, expenses, and logistics. Chillicothe’s mayor, Michael Hughes, said the festival brings in approximately $50,000 on average. The event is planning a "redefined" version for 2024, which may be smaller with fewer stage acts. Goldberg told the Pantagraph that the new event would continue to offer diverse music styles. Goldberg told WCBU that the new event would offer a "clean slate" without expectations from the last two decades.

The 2023 event hosted over 150 artists playing 247 sets, with over 260 hours of music. Over 20,000 attendees participated.

==== Line up, among others ====
- Umphrey's McGee
- moe.
- Willie Nelson
- Leah Marlene
- Excision
- Ganja White Night
- Boogie T
- Goose
- Fearless Flying Frog Brigade

=== 2024 ===
In December 2023, it was announced that Summer Camp Music Festival would be rebranded as Solshine: A Music & Arts Reverie. The scheduled dates for Solshine are May 24–26, 2024.

On Friday, May 24, 2024, there was a short “code red” prompting a temporary shutdown of music because of inclement weather. Lightning and thunder was in the area with rain. The gates reopened at approximately 6pm, and String Cheese performed at 6:15pm, one hour later than scheduled.

==== Headliners ====
- Umphrey's McGee
- Goose
- The Werks
- Disco Biscuits
- deadmau5
- STS9
- String Cheese Incident

=== 2025 ===
In 2025, the event returned to the Summer Camp name. Organizers announced it would move from its regular venue, Three Sisters Park, due to "economic factors". The festival was rebranded as a non-camping three-day event on the Peoria Riverfront stage, but was cancelled two months prior to the Memorial Day weekend event. Following the cancellation announcement, the organizers changed to a concert series throughout the summer at the Peoria Riverfront.

=== 2026 ===
For its 25th anniversary, the 2026 festival was scheduled at Three Sisters Park for May 21–24, 2026.

In February 2026, the organizers announced that moe. and Umphrey's McGee would not be at the 2026 event. The proposed lineup included Two Friends, Manic Focus, Big Gigantic, Maddy O’Neal, STS9, The Floozies, Marc Rebillet, three6mafia, Greensky Bluegrass, SunSquabi, Mike Posner, 2 Chainz, Lettuce, The Werks, Andy Frasco & The U.N., TECH N9NE, Yonder Mountain String Band, lespecial, Neal Francis, Late Night Radio, Neighbor, Sneezy, and others.

On May 8, 2026, the festival organizers posted via social media and its website homepage that the event had been cancelled due to "unforeseen financial circumstances". Chillicothe City Council members reported that the festival had not obtained medical support for the event.

== See also ==
- List of jam band music festivals
