= Chicago Afrobeat Project =

- Also known as: CAbP
- Origin: Chicago, Illinois, U.S.
- Genres: Afrobeat, world music, funk, jazz, hip hop, jùjú music, rock music
- Years active: 2002–present
- Label: CAbP Music
- Members: David Glines; Kevin Ford; Garrick Smith; Angelo Garcia; Ryan Tedder; Mark Thomson; Xavier Galdon; Parris Fleming; Danjuma Gaskin; Luc Parcell
- Website: chicagoafrobeatproject.com

Chicago Afrobeat Project (CAbP) is a seven- to 14-piece world music ensemble with influences including afrobeat, hip hop, funk, jazz, jùjú music, and rock. The members are well versed in afrobeat, the musical style of Fela Kuti and Tony Allen, and use it as a jumping off point to explore other styles. Based in Chicago, the band began in 2002 in a loft at 657 West Lake Street. The group is sometimes accompanied by African dancers from Chicago's Muntu Dance Theatre as well as Ayodele Drum & Dance. The group has released five studio efforts between 2005 and 2017, all recorded at Fullerton Recording Studios. In the summers of 2013 and 2014, the band collaborated with Fela Kuti's original drummer, Tony Allen, for a series of performances and recording sessions at Fullerton Recording Studios with the resulting work featured on the album What Goes Up (2017).

== Members ==
- David Glines - Guitar
- Kevin Ford - Keyboards, Studio Shaman
- Garrick Smith - Baritone Saxophone
- Angelo Garcia - Tenor Saxophone
- Ryan Tedder - Tenor Saxophone, Baritone Saxophone, Keyboards, Guitar
- Mark Thomson - Trombone
- Xavier Galdon - Trombone
- Parris Fleming - Trumpet
- Danjuma Gaskin - Percussion
- Luc Parcell - Bass
- Chadwick - Painter (select shows)
- TJ Okulnola - Talking Drum (select shows)
- Tosha Alston - Dancer (select shows)
- Imania Detry - Dancer (select shows)

== Awards ==
- 2017 - Chicago Tribune (Greg Kot) Top 10 Chicago Indie Releases of 2017
- 2017 - Winner, Best African Artist: Chicago Music Awards
- 2014 - Best International/World Music Act: Chicago Reader's "Best of Chicago 2014
- 2014 - Winner, Best African Entertainer: Chicago Music Awards
- 2013 - Tied for Runner-Up, Best International/World Music Act: Chicago Reader's "Best of Chicago 2013"
- 2013 - Rhapsody Music Top 25 World Music Albums (Nyash UP!)
- 2012 - Winner, Best African Artist: Chicago Music Awards
- 2011 - Winner, Best African Artist: Chicago Music Awards
- 2010 - Winner, Best African Artist: Chicago Music Awards
- 2009 - Winner, Best African Artist: Chicago Music Awards
- 2008 - Winner, Best African Artist: Chicago Music Awards
- 2006 - Nominated for Chicago Music Award's "Award of Honor for Contribution to World beat Music"
- 2005 - Nominated Best African Artist: Chicago Music Awards
- 2004 - Nominated Best African Artist: Chicago Music Awards

== Selected festivals ==
- Hyde Park Jazz Festival (2017)
- Chicago World Music Festival (2003, 2006, 2013, 2015)
- Utah Arts Festival - Salt Lake City, UT (2008, 2012)
- CIMMfest (Chicago International Movies & Music Festival) - Chicago, IL (2016)
- Summerfest - Milwaukee, WI (2014, 2015)
- North Coast Music Festival Official After Party (with Tony Allen) - Chicago, IL (2014)
- Bear Creek Music Festival - Live Oak, FL (2008)
- High Sierra Music Festival (2007, 2008)
- Wakarusa Music Festival (2006, 2008)
- Detroit Concert of Colors - Detroit, MI (2014)
- Boogie on the Bricks - Athens, OH (2016)
- Evanston Ethnic Arts & Music Festival - Evanston, IL (2016)
- Celebrate Clark Street - Chicago, IL (2007, 2008, 2016)
- Green Eggs & Jam - Leavenworth, KS (2015)
- Merchant Street Music Festival - Kankakee, IL (2015)
- Logan Square Arts Festival - Chicago, IL (2015)
- Felabration - Denver, CO (2014)
- Deschutes Brewery Warehouse Party - Bend, OR (2014)
- Sweet Pea Festival - Bozeman, MT (2014)
- Ann Arbor Summer Festival - Ann Arbor, MI (2014)
- Arcadia Creek Festival Place - Kalamazoo, MI (2014)
- Reggae in the Mountains - Ketchum, ID (2013)
- Windy City Ribfest - Chicago, IL (2013)
- Artoberfest - Benton Harbor, MI (2013)
- Andersonville Midsommarfest - Chicago, IL (2012)
- Groovefest - Cedar City, UT (2012)
- Dubuquefest - Dubuque, IA (2012)
- Starwood Festival (2011)
- Traverse City Summer Microbrew and Music Festival - Traverse City, MI (2010)
- Camp Euforia - Lone Tree, IA (2007, 2010, 2020)
- Mid Summer Meltdown Music Festival - Kempton, PA (2010)
- Truckee Reggae Fest - Truckee, CA (2009)
- Taste of Chicago - Chicago, IL (2009)
- Bele Chere Music Festival (2005, 2006)
- Chicago's Summer Dance Series (2005, 2007, 2010)
- Summer Camp Festival (2005, 2007, 2008)
- Vassar College Jazz Festival (2005, 2006)

== Guest musicians ==
=== Live ===
  - Tony Allen - (2013, 2014, 2018)
  - Sugar Blue - (2013)
  - JC Brooks - (2013, 2017)
  - Akenya - (2017)
  - Kiara Lanier (2017)
  - Ugochi (2008, 2011, 2017)
  - Sahr from FELA! on Broadway - 2012
  - Jeff Parker from Tortoise
  - Howard Levy
  - Bobby Broom
  - Fareed Haque
  - Paul Wertico
  - Dave Watts from The Motet

=== Recordings ===
  - Tony Allen (2017)
  - Ugochi (2007, 2009, 2017)
  - Bobby Broom (2007)
  - Fareed Haque (2005)
  - J.C. Brooks (2017)
  - Akenya (2017)
  - Isaiah Oby (2017)
  - Òrànmíyàn (2017)
  - Kiara Lanier (2017)
  - Legit (2017)
  - Rico Sisney from Sidewalk Chalk (2017)
  - Maggie Vagle from Sidewalk Chalk (2017)
  - Diverse (2005)
  - Brother Mike (2005)

== Discography ==
=== Albums ===
- What Goes Up - Independent (2017)
- Nyash UP! - CAbP Music (2013)
- (A) Move to Silent Unrest - CAbP Music (2007)
- Chicago Afrobeat Project - CAbP Music (2005)

=== EPs ===
- Off the Grid EP - CAbP Music (2009)

=== Compilations Featured ===
- Rough Guide to Afrobeat Revival (2009)
