= Tauk (disambiguation) =

Tauk is an American band from Long Island, New York.

Tauk may also refer to:

- William Tauk, England's Chief Baron of the Exchequer in 1375
- Tauk, a meteorite which fell in Iraq in 1929
