= Here Come the Mummies =

American funk rock band

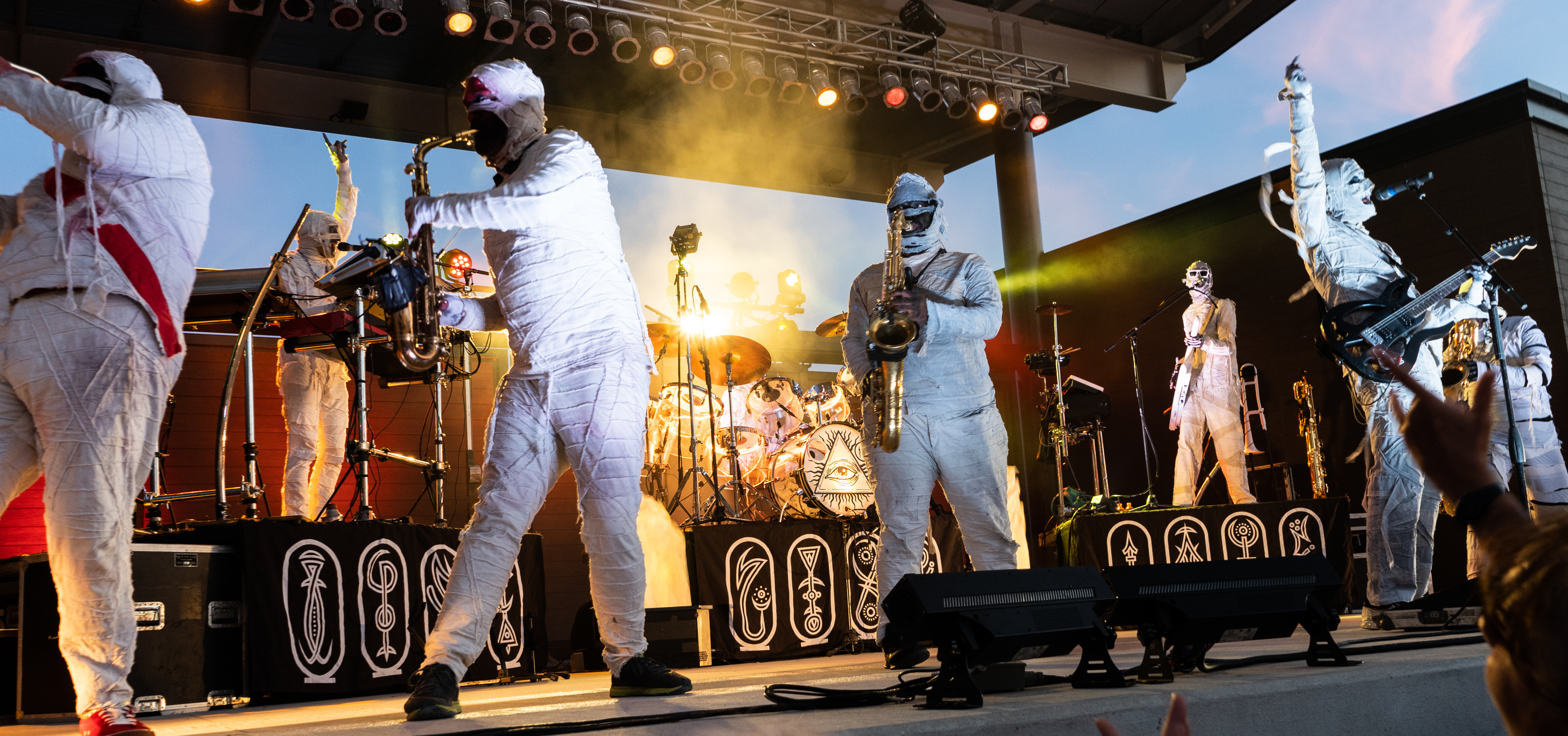
- Here Come the Mummies performing in 2021

Background information
- Origin: Nashville, Tennessee, U.S.
- Genres: Funk; R&B; funk rock
- Years active: 1999–present
- Label: Sphinxter Records
- Members: Mummy Cass, Eddie Mummy, K.W. TuT, Spazzy Mummy, Midnight Mummy, Dr. Yo, High Priest of Death, Mummy Highlander
- Website: herecomethemummies.com

Here Come the Mummies (HCTM) is an American funk band best known for its live performances and anonymous band members.

The band consists of various professional musicians based in Nashville, Tennessee. There are rumored to be several Grammy Awards among the members, though this is difficult to verify, as the identities of band members are kept tightly "under wraps." Members are believed to be under contract to various record labels, hiding their identities so as to prevent contract disputes while performing.

According to the band's humorous promotional material: "Some say [the band was] cursed after deflowering a great Pharaoh's daughter. Others claim they are reincarnated Grammy-Winning studio musicians. Regardless, HCTM's mysterious personas, cunning song-craft, and unrelenting live show will bend your brain, and melt your face."

== Style and influences ==
Here Come the Mummies plays funk, rhythm and blues and funk rock that incorporates elements of jazz, soul, ska and reggae. The band's influences include Otis Redding, Sly and the Family Stone, Stevie Wonder, Commodores and Kool & the Gang.

While garage rock band The Mummies also performs in bandages and anonymously, Here Come the Mummies was not inspired by them and only learned of their existence years after forming. However, they support The Mummies and consider them funny.

== Members ==
=== Current ===
Current members of the band are:

- Mummy Cass – Guitar, Lead vocals
- Eddie Mummy – Drums, Vocals
- Spazzy Mummy (Spaz) – Keyboards, Vocals
- K.W. TuT – Bass, Vocals
- Fingerbang - Bass, Vocals
- Midnight Mummy – Baritone Sax, Tenor Sax, Alto Sax, Flute, Beatboxing, Trombone, Keytar, Percussion, Talkbox, Vocals, MC, Angle Grinder
- High Priest of Death (HPOD) – Trumpet
- Dr. Yo! (known as Mummy Yo! prior to receiving his doctorate) – Baritone Sax, Tenor Sax, Alto Sax, Sousaphone, Trumpet, Flute, Beatboxing, Vocals, Angle Grinder
- Mummy Highlander – Tenor Sax

=== Former ===
Former members of the band include:

- Flava Mummy – Bass, Vocals
- Oozie Mummy – Trumpet, Harmonica, Vocals
- Teste Verde – Trumpet
- Bucking Blanco – Trumpet
- Ramses Mummy – Bass
- Sinbad Hozer – Baritone Sax
- Java Mummy (born 1974 B.C. as J Mummy Love) – Percussion, Vocals, MC
- Will Pharaoh – Trumpet
- Tito – Trumpet
- B.B. Queen – Trumpet
- Gold Member - Trumpet
- Jo Jo Ma - Saxophone
- Bone Air - Trombone
- Boy Algae - Trombone
- Slide - Trombone
- Maximum Mummy - Saxophone
- Mummy Rah - Tenor Sax
- The Flu (formerly known as Sicko Mummy) – Alto Sax, Baritone Sax, Clarinet, Flute, Piccolo
- The Pole! – Bass
- Snatchmo
- Two-zie Mummy
- The Probe
- Sousa Claus
- Octoberfist
- Patches
- Goldfinger
- Miracle Mummy
- Bangrene - Trombone
- Mo'Betta
- Dicksome
- D.C.
- Devo Mummy - Saxophone
- Yummy Mummy - Keys
- Maniac Mummy
- Mummy Hilfiger
- Mandomum Mummy
- Jerk-A-Mummy - Violin on "Dirty Minds"
- Crusty Mummy - Tenor saxophone
- Uncle Tuck - Tenor saxophone
- Wigglesworth
- Hokiemum
- Mummy Igor
- Little Deuce
- Periphe
- Mummy Wonder
- Stretch - bass
- Mothalode – Saxophone
- Mummy Lingus - Saxophone
- The Great Grabsby - Saxophone
- The Shriek - Trumpet

== Discography ==
=== Albums ===
- Terrifying Funk from Beyond the Grave (2002)
- Everlasting Party (2003)
- Single Entendre (2008)
- Undead Live...The CD (2010)
- Carnal Carnival (2010)
- Bed, Bath & Behind (2011)
- Introducing the Tiny Tuts (2012)
- Cryptic (2013)
- Underground (2016)
- A Blessing and a Curse (2016)
- All Excess (2018)
- HOUSE PARTY (2022)

=== Extended plays ===
- Secret Santa (2012)
- A La Mode (2014)
- Pull It Off (2014)
- Shocker (2014)
- MuertoDiesel (2014)
- Road Trip (2026)

=== Singles ===
- "Jive Turkey" (2013)
- "Late Night Booty Call" (2018)
- "Secret Santa" (2018)
- "Live in the Moment" (2018)
- "King of the Underworld" (2018)
- "I Spy" (2019)
- "Somebody's Watching Me" feat. Saxquatch (2023)

=== Compilation albums ===
- Hits & Mrs. (2012)
- CuriosiTease, Volume 1 (2013)
- Threesome (2014)

=== Videos ===
- Undead Live (2009)
- Introducing the Tiny Tuts (2012)
- Rejuvannihilation (2013)
- MMXV (2016)
- Live in the Flesh (2021)
- HOUSE PARTY (2022)

=== Other appearances ===
- Bob and Tom Dead Air Disc 2 (2009)
- Fired Up! Original Motion Picture Soundtrack (2009)
- Feed The Fire (2025)

== Movie and TV appearances ==
The band's song "Dirty Minds" has been featured on the television shows Big Shots (S1-E2), The Loop (S1-E2 and S2-E2), and Scrubs (S2-E10), as well as the movie Fired Up!, also appearing on the Fired Up! official soundtrack.

Since 2009 the band has played multiple times on the Bob and Tom morning show. They have since become one of the show's favorite musical guests.

In 2011, for Halloween, the band performed two of their songs on the morning show Fox & Friends on national television.

In 2014 the band had their own episode on PBS's Front and Center (S3-E9) featuring an edited version of their most recent live album concert film "Rejuvannihilation"

In 2020 the band made a television appearance as the house band for “Josh Gates Tonight” (S1-E12) for an episode regarding ancient Egypt.

The band's latest television appearance was on the TV show That's My Jam (S1-E7) in 2022, as one of the show's guest musical artists.
