= Van Ghost =

Van Ghost is a band from Chicago, Illinois, formed by concert promoter Michael Harrison Berg and featuring vocalist Jennifer Hartswick. In 2007 after building up a solid repertoire of folk ballads, gritty Americana tunes and classic rock laced jams, Berg assembled an all-star cast of musicians and named the project Van Ghost.

With a six-piece band flavored with pedal steel and psychedelic guitars, rhythm section, and haunting guy/girl harmonies, the band played its debut show before a packed audience at Chicago's revered Metro in January 2008.

Following up their debut record, “Melodies For Lovers“, on Split Red Records, the band headed down to Nashville, TN to begin the tracking of their next release. With 2009 Grammy award-winning Producer/Engineer/Mixer, Justin Niebank at the helm the band's sound continues to develop and expand.

At the age of 20, having already recorded on two albums with Trey Anastasio (Story of the Ghost, Phish, 1998, and One Man's Trash, Trey Anastasio, 1998), Jennifer was asked to join Anastasio's new band. She has been a member of the band for the last ten years, touring internationally and sharing the stage and studio with artists like Carlos Santana, Dave Matthews, The Rolling Stones and Herbie Hancock. She has also appeared on The Tonight Show with Jay Leno, the Late Show with David Letterman, Late Night with Conan O'Brien, and Austin City Limits.

Van Ghost's sound, categorized as Alt-Country, is comparable to O.A.R. and Widespread Panic.

With a revolving line-up of guest musicians, Van Ghost tours regularly at music festivals across the country including Summer Camp Music Festival, Mountain Jam, Bear Creek, and the Chicago Bluegrass and Blues Festival.

Van Ghost made its recorded debut in 2009 with the CD Melodies for Lovers on Split Red Records.

Van Ghost is:

- Michael Harrison Berg: Lead Vocals/Guitar
- Jennifer Hartswick: Vocals
- Rocco Labriola: Pedal Steel
- Grant Tye: Guitar
- Klem Hayes: Bass
- Greg Marsh: Drums

The original line-up on "Melodies For Lovers" (through 2009):

- Michael Harrison Berg: Lead Vocals/Guitar
- Jennifer Hartswick: Vocals
- Rocco Labriola: Pedal Steel
- Dan Wean: Guitar
- John Cwiok: Bass
- Cory Healy: Drums

Guest Musicians:

- Mike Poupko: Guitar
- Greg Spero: Keyboards
- Allie Kral: Fiddle
- Nick Cassarino: Guitar
- Jeff Greene: Bass
