= The Ragbirds =

American folk-rock-world fusion band

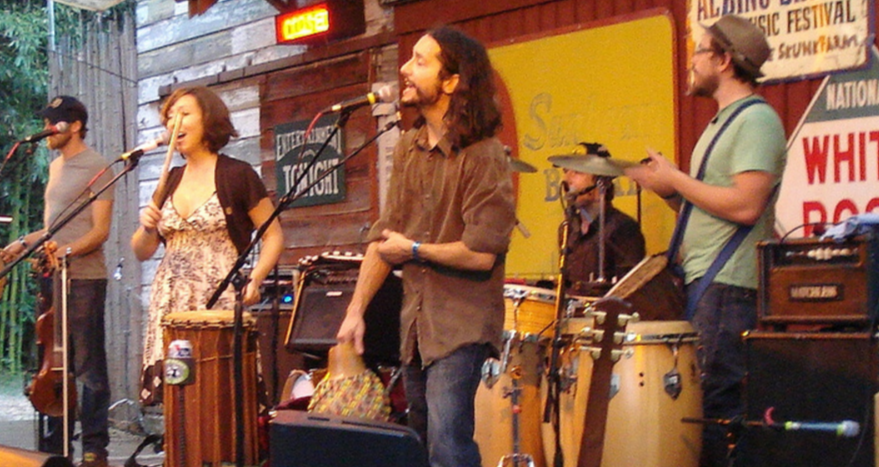
- The Ragbirds performing at Albino Skunk Music Festival in Greer, South Carolina, October 2013.

Background information
- Origin: Ann Arbor, Michigan
- Genres: Folk, world
- Years active: 2005–present
- Label: Rock Ridge
- Members: Erin Zindle; T.J. Zindle; Loren Kranz; Shannon Wade
- Past members: Jeff Stinson; Adam Labeaux; Greg White; Tim Dziekan; Matthew Melody; Randall Moore; Dan Hildebrandt
- Website: theragbirds.com

Erin Zindle & The Ragbirds are a four-piece, female-led, folk-rock-world fusion band out of Ann Arbor, Michigan. They describe their music as "infectious global groove". The musical roots of the group sound are complex - with Gypsy, Middle-Eastern, Americana, rock, and Latin influences, all stirred with a Celtic fiddler's bow. In live performances the band incorporates variations on traditional African drum pieces, each member trading their instrument for a hand drum. The songs carry a positive message and include both pop hooks and improvised solos. It is music that fits stages of many sizes and styles - from listening rooms - to jam-band music festivals - to bars and clubs with a hyped-up dance floor.

The Ragbirds make use of numerous traditional folk instruments, blending them with modern sounds to create an infectious world groove rooted in the traditions of many cultures and eras. The group has released five full-length studio albums, two live records and one single - all self-produced and independently released. Their newest album, The Threshold & The Hearth, was released March 25, 2016 via Rock Ridge Music.

== History ==
The Ragbirds began in Ypsilanti, Michigan in 2005 and moved to neighboring Ann Arbor in 2007. Vocalist and instrumentalist Erin Zindle and drummer Randall Moore began recording Zindle's original songs before they had a band to perform them live and those recordings became The Ragbirds' debut album, "Yes Nearby", which was released in the summer of 2005. The original members included bassist Jeff Stinson, guitarist and vocalist Adam Labeaux, and percussionist Greg White. White only stayed with the group for six months and was then replaced by Tim Dziekan, who had been a student of Moore's.

In 2005, following Hurricane Katrina the group decided to record one of their popular songs often played live, "Washed Away" (formerly titled "Mangrove"). This recording was released as a single and a portion of the proceeds were donated to the Red Cross. In 2006 The Ragbirds released a live album called Catching Fire, recorded in January at their hometown bar and the place they got their start - T.C.'s Speakeasy in Ypsilanti, Michigan. That album and the single are both currently discontinued. In April 2006 the sadness of the death of a good friend of the band and "merch girl" Lisa Radtke was followed by the happiness of Moore's marriage proposal to Zindle, and they were married on September 22, 2006. In October 2006, the group introduced Matthew Melody as the new guitarist/vocalist to replace Labeaux. In early winter 2007 Dan Hildebrandt replaced Stinson on bass.

In 2007 the Ragbirds began to tour nationally reaching as far west as Colorado and as far south as Florida. By 2009, The Ragbirds had traveled throughout the country, and even venturing out on their first International tour. The Ragbirds' second full-length studio album, Wanderlove was released in June 2007. It included several songs which previously appeared on Catching Fire. Wanderlove has a world-travel theme with a pop appeal and was the number one selling album on Homegrown Music Network by the Fall of 2008. Signed to Buffalo Records in Japan in February, 2009, The Ragbirds Wanderlove CD was distributed to Tower Records stores throughout Japan. The band flew to Japan to perform at the Green Room Festival in Yokohama and at Tower Records Shibuya, Tokyo store, as well as an additional gig at Stove's in Yokohama. In 2009, The Ragbirds worked with producer Tim Carbone (of Railroad Earth) to record their third studio album, Finally Almost Ready. Mixed and mastered by Grammy Award-winning producer and engineer Phil Nicolo, the album was self-released in the US and released in Japan by Buffalo Records in August 2009.

Their fourth album, Travelin' Machine was released in 2012. Their live album, We Belong to the Love was released in 2014.

Traveling in a van that runs on Recycled Vegetable Oil in order to promote sustainability, The Ragbirds have performed in over 46 U.S. states including major markets such as New York City, Nashville, Chicago, Denver, Detroit, Cleveland, St. Louis, Indianapolis and many more. They have been featured at some of the Mid-West's largest music festivals including Rothbury Music Festival and 10,000 Lakes and have shared the stage with Railroad Earth, Steve Kimock, Cornmeal, Toubab Krewe, Hot Buttered Rum, Donna The Buffalo, Big Leg Emma, Jeff Daniels, Tea Leaf Green, Dirty Dozen Brass Band, Mamadou Diabate, The Duhks, Wookiefoot, ekoostik hookah, and many more.

T.J. Zindle, founding member of Last Conservative (and Erin's brother) is the Ragbirds current guitarist. He joined the band to replace Melody in January 2009.

In April 2015, the band headed into the studio with producer Jamie Candiloro (R.E.M., Ryan Adams & The Cardinals, Willie Nelson) to record "The Threshold & The Hearth" (due out March 25, 2016 on Rock Ridge Music). The album traces the fictional story of a couple named Betty and Bill, who meet in college, get married, raise a family and weather the trials of a long-term relationship. Much of the material was written in the wake of the birth of Zindle and Moore's daughter Aviva, who toured with the band regularly.

== Members ==
- Erin Zindle - vocals, violin, mandolin, banjo, accordion, percussion
- T.J. Zindle - guitar, vocals
- Loren Kranz - Drum set, vocals
- Shannon Wade - Electric bass guitar, percussion, vocals
