= The Werks =

American rock band

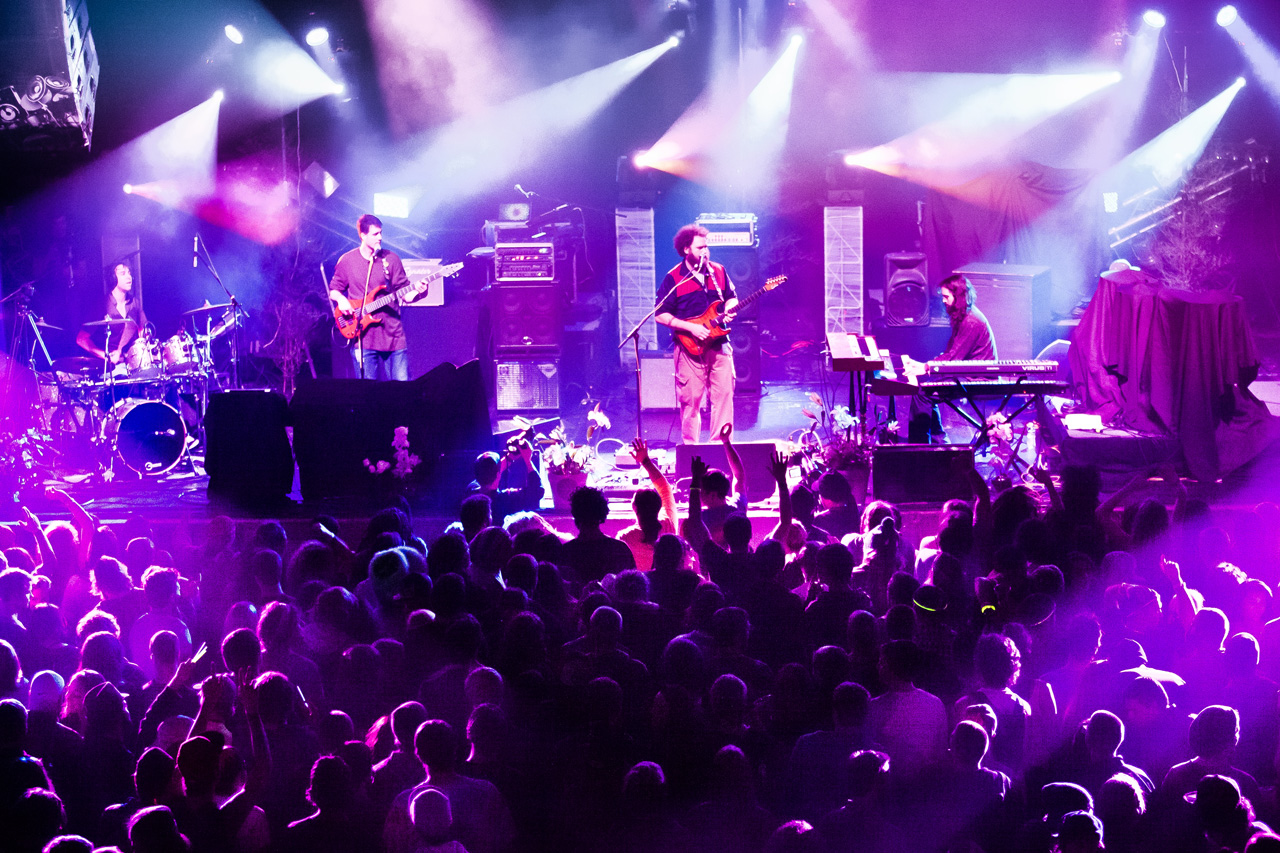
- L-R: Rob Chafin, Dino Dimitrouleas, Chris Houser and Norman Dimitrouleas; Photo: Brian Hockensmith

Background information
- Origin: Dayton, Ohio, United States
- Genres: Rock, jam band, funk, Psychedelic rock, roots rock, indie rock, Electronic dance music
- Years active: 2005-Current
- Members: Rob Chafin; Chuckie Love; Chris Houser; Dan Shaw
- Past members: Aaron Armstrong; Dave Bartoletti; Norman Dimitrouleas; Jake Goldberg; Dino Dimitrouleas
- Website: thewerksmusic.com

The Werks is an American rock band originating from Dayton, Ohio and noted for its musical improvisation and exploration of music across multiple genres. Founded in 2005 by Dave Bartoletti (keys), Rob Chafin (drummer), Chris Houser (guitar) and Chuck Love (bass), the band is best known for its quick rise into the jam band music scene and appearances at major festivals and events across the US and abroad. In early June 2011, the band rose to prominence when it hit the number 2 top searched artists on the leading online Jam Magazine, jambase.com, behind the band Phish and again in early 2012 when they hit number 1. Current members of the band are as follows; Rob Chafin- Drums, Vocals, Samples / Chucky Love- Bass, Vocals / Chris Houser- Guitar, Vocals / Dan Shaw- Keyboards, Vocals.

== History ==
=== Formation ===
In 2005 the foursome met while attending a local music contest in Dayton, Ohio. After agreeing to commit to a band project, they named the group after their first meal together; ordering a dish with "The Works" from a local restaurant. The naming convention would be changed to "The Werks" soon after. The band officially formed in 2007 and Dave Bartoletti would leave the band one year later; he was replaced by keyboardist, Norman Dimitrouleas who previously performed in another Dayton band, The Maji. In the summer of 2011, bassist Dino Dimitrouleas, also from the Maji, replaced founding member Chuck Love and percussionist, Aaron Armstrong, from Toledo, Ohio, would join with the band from May through November of that same year. Dan Shaw, of Columbus, Ohio, replaced Norman Dimitrouleas, now deceased, in 2014 as the band's keyboardist. Jake Goldberg then replaced Dino Dimitrouleas in 2016 on bass.

== Musical style ==
=== Techniques ===
The band incorporates rock, vintage psychedelic, funk music, and livetronica into their own musical form, called "psychedelic dance rock". It bridges a gap by incorporating high energy music and high production values with themes that embrace "exploratory jams", a more accepted "shift occurring in the musical world", according to some critics.

== Other ==
=== Festivals ===
The Werks have played many notable festivals, including appearances at The Peach Music Festival, Wakarusa Music & Camping Festival, Summer Camp Music Festival, Electric Forest, High Sierra Music Festival, All Good Music Festival, Camp Bisco, including their own festival, the Werk Out Music and Arts Festival, held annually each August in Central Ohio. In 2017, 2 more namesake events were debuted, the Winter Werk Out Music and Arts Festival in Columbus, OH in February and the Werk Out West Music and Arts Festival in Denver, CO in March. The 2nd annual Winter Werk Out in Columbus in February 2018 featured Papadosio as a headliner; the 3rd annual Winter Werk Out in 2019 featured Emancipator, EOTO, Tropidelic, and Zach Deputy. At the 10th annual Werk Out Festival in August 2019 in Thornville, OH, featured their biggest line up to date: STS9, Big Gigantic, Lennon Claypool Delirium, Twiddle, Dopapod, Cory Wong, and more.

=== Tapers ===
The Werks have adopted the policy of allowing fans to tape, trade, and distribute their live shows. Werkers (fans) have been taping and trading shows since their inception, which has helped them to gain their national following. John Earl "Chubby" Howard was an original taper of the band. (September 5, 1960 - July 3, 2017)

== Discography ==
- Dig It (May, 2007)
- Synapse (May, 2009)
- Live at The Werk Out Music Festival 2010 (October, 2010)
- The Werks (April, 2012)
- The Mr. Smalls Sessions (September, 2014)
- Inside A Dream (November, 2015)
- Live at The Werk Out 2016 (January, 2017)
- Magic (March, 2017)
- Sonder: Encounters (January, 2019)
