= Andy Frasco & The U.N. =

American blues rock band

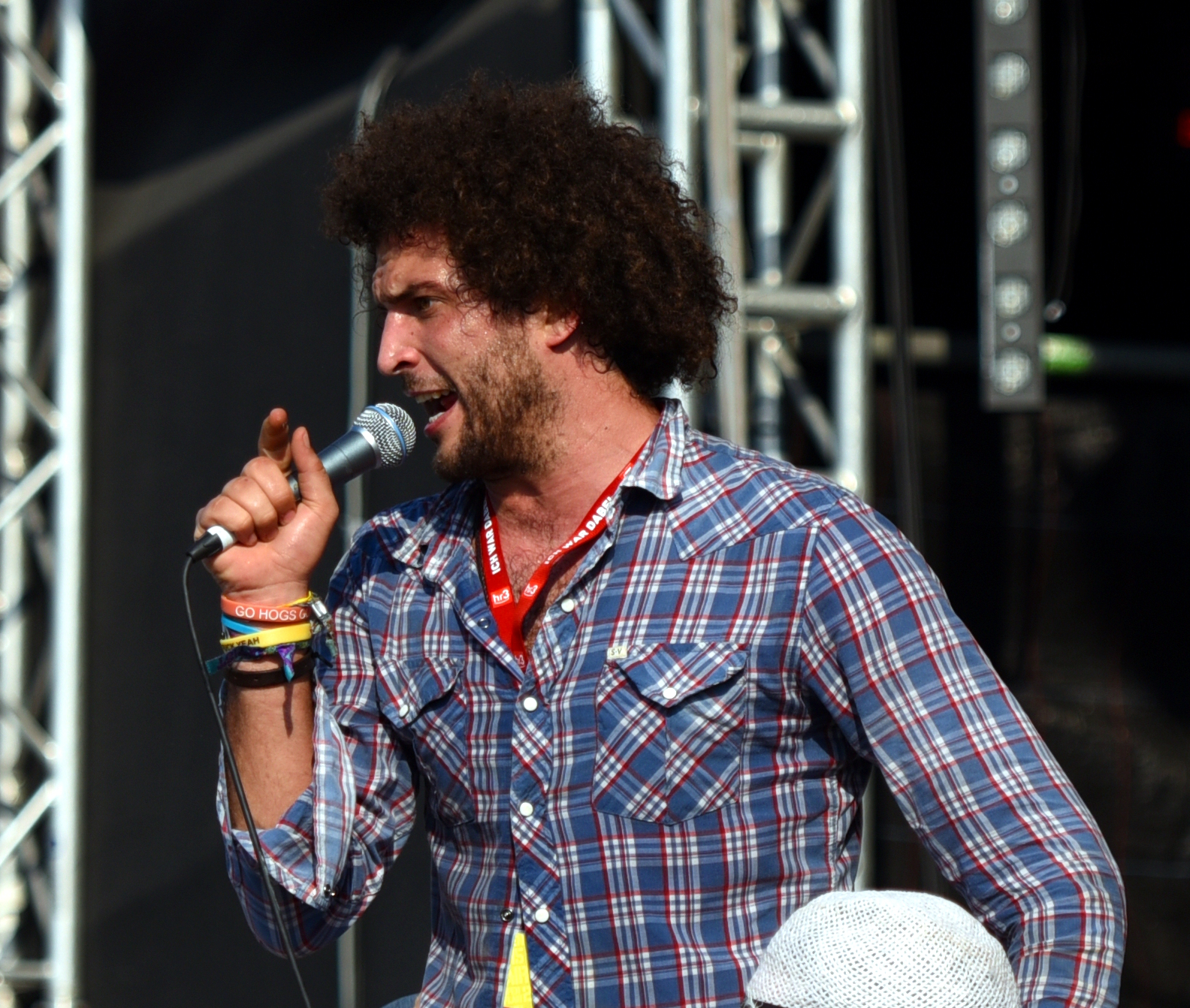
- Frasco performing in 2015

Background information
- Origin: Los Angeles, California, United States
- Genres: Blues, rock
- Years active: 2007–present
- Labels: Fun Machine Records, Ruf Records; SideOneDummy Records
- Members: Andrew Frasco; Mike Gantzer; Andee Avila; Floyd Kellogg; Sam Kelly; Allie Kral; Andrew Cooney; Rich Derbyshire
- Past members: Shawn Eckels; Daniel Avila; Ernie Chang; Matt Romero; Adam Watson; Supa Man; Matt Owen; Jelmer Olsman; Niels Kant
- Website: www.andyfrasco.com

Andy Frasco & The U.N. are a genre blending rock band formed in Los Angeles, California, United States in 2007. The band consists of Andrew Frasco (lead vocals, keys), Sam Kelly (saxophone), Mike Gantzer (guitar, vocals), Andee "Beats" Avila (drums, vocals), Floyd Kellogg (bass guitar), Allie Kral (fiddle, vocals), and Andrew Cooney (guitar, vocals). Rich Derbyshire (bass guitar, vocals) of Wild Adriatic shares bassist duties with Floyd Kellog. Historically, the band has also included a rotating and evolving cast of additional band members to form the U.N. Additional featured members of the U.N. include Daniel Avila (guitar), Supa Man (bass guitar) from the band Philosophy of Soul, and Matt Owen (tuba) of Eclectic Tuba, as well as members of the Kris Lager Band: Kris Lager (guitar, vocals), Jeremiah Weir (organ, keys), Brandon Miller (bass guitar), and John Fairchild (drums). Dutch musicians Jelmer Olsman (bass guitar and drums), Niels Kant (trumpet) also toured with the band.

To date, the band has released ten studio albums: Love, You're Just Too Expensive (2010), Road Life Revival (2012), Just a Good Ole Time (2013), Half a Man (2014), Happy Bastards (2016), Change of Pace (2019), Keep On Keepin' On (2020), Wash, Rinse, Repeat (2022), and L'Optimist (2023)., Growing Pains (2025).

In 2017, the band released their first live album (CD and DVD) entitled Songs From The Road, which was recorded in August 2016 at the Tucher Blues and Jazz Festival in Bamberg, Germany. In September 2021, they released Live On the Rocks, an album recorded live at the Red Rocks Amphitheatre in Colorado on May 27, 2021.

== Sound ==
Their sound has been described as "blues-rock fueled by reckless abandonment and a disregard for the rules, with witty lyrics to back it all up".

== Performances ==
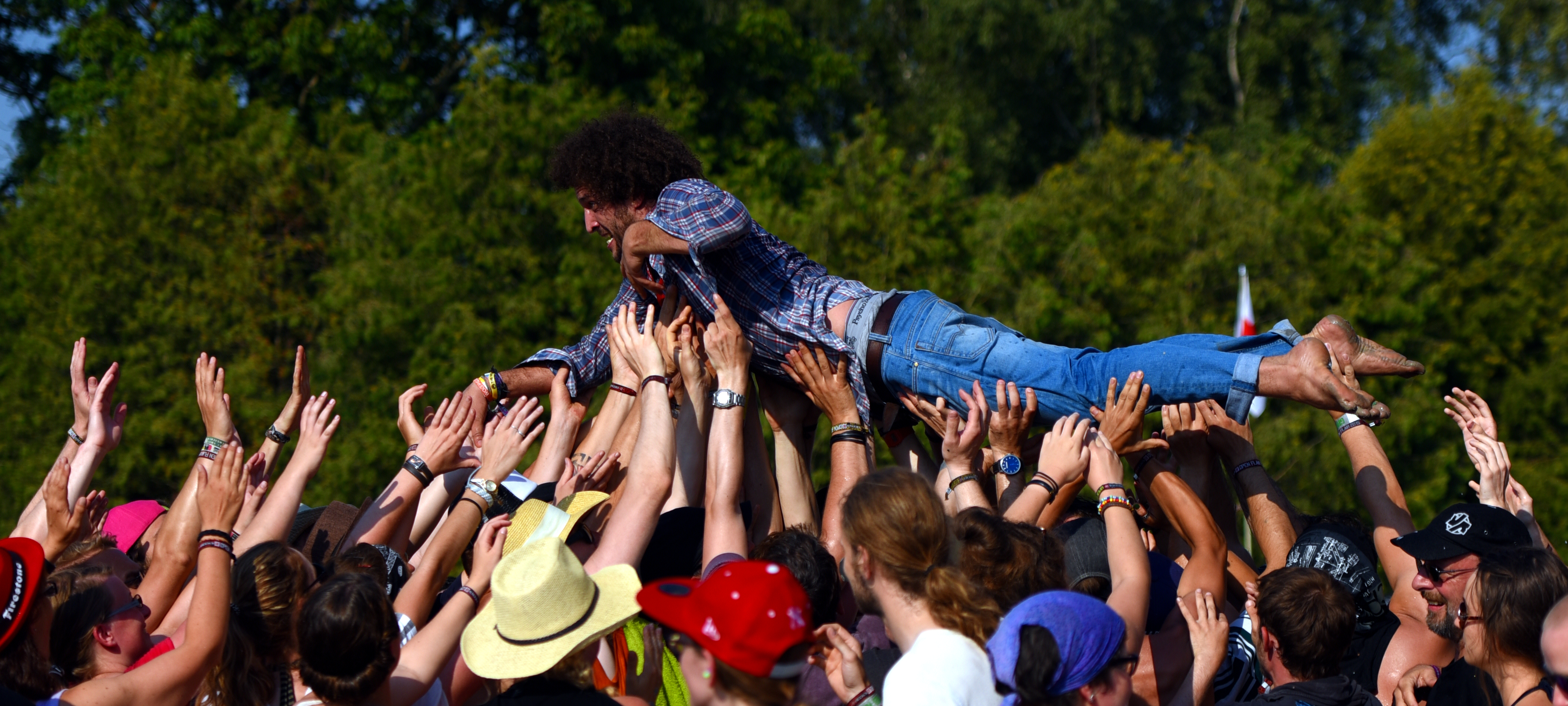
Andy Frasco stagediving at the Open Flair festival 2015 in Germany

Andy Frasco & The U.N.’s performances have been described as a "boisterous blend of harmonic funk and jazzy influences, all topped with boundless energy". Frasco frequently calls additional guest musicians to join his band on stage during sets, as well as fans. Shows are highly improvisational, featuring impromptu “battles” between band members, who graciously hop off stage into the crowd to contest their instrumental fortitude against one another in a sporting display of individual musicianship. Frasco's shows are also highly interactive, often stopping the show to speak directly to audience members, as well as invite people in the audience up on stage.

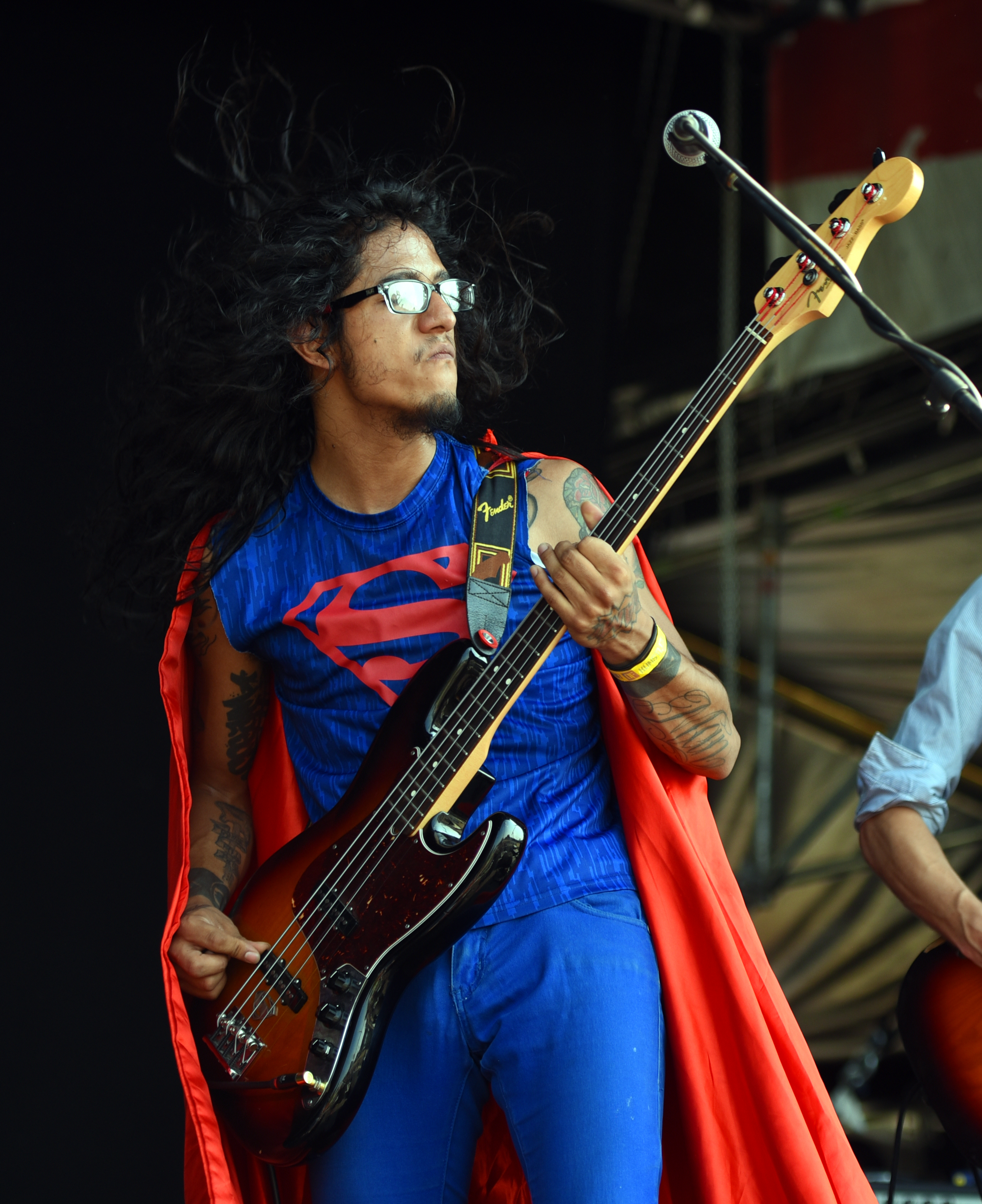
Supa Man playing the bass guitar

Andy Frasco & The U.N. are recognized for their heavy tour schedule and D.I.Y. work ethic. The band has toured the U.S. numerous times over, as well as Europe and China, performing at festivals such as Wakarusa, Electric Forest Festival, Sacred Rose Festival, Summer Camp Music Festival, Yonder Mountain String Band's Harvest Festival, String Cheese Incident's Festival at Horning's Hideout, Cotai Jazz & Blues Festival, Zwarte Cross Festival, Paaspop, Koningsmiddag Festival, Geuzenpop Festival, and the Tucher Jazz & Blues Festival.

=== Wakarusa 2014 ===
Andy Frasco & The U.N. co-headlined a handful of Pre-Wakarusa events with support from Mike Dillon's Band of Outsiders, performed two sets at the festival, and shared guest hosting duties, introducing many big-name acts such as The Flaming Lips.

=== Electric Forest 2014 ===
The band was selected by Live for Live Music as the top performance pick. SoundFuse Magazine stated "This was easily one of the most energetic moments of the weekend," noting the crowds' lively dancing and attempts to rush onto the stage.

== Discography ==
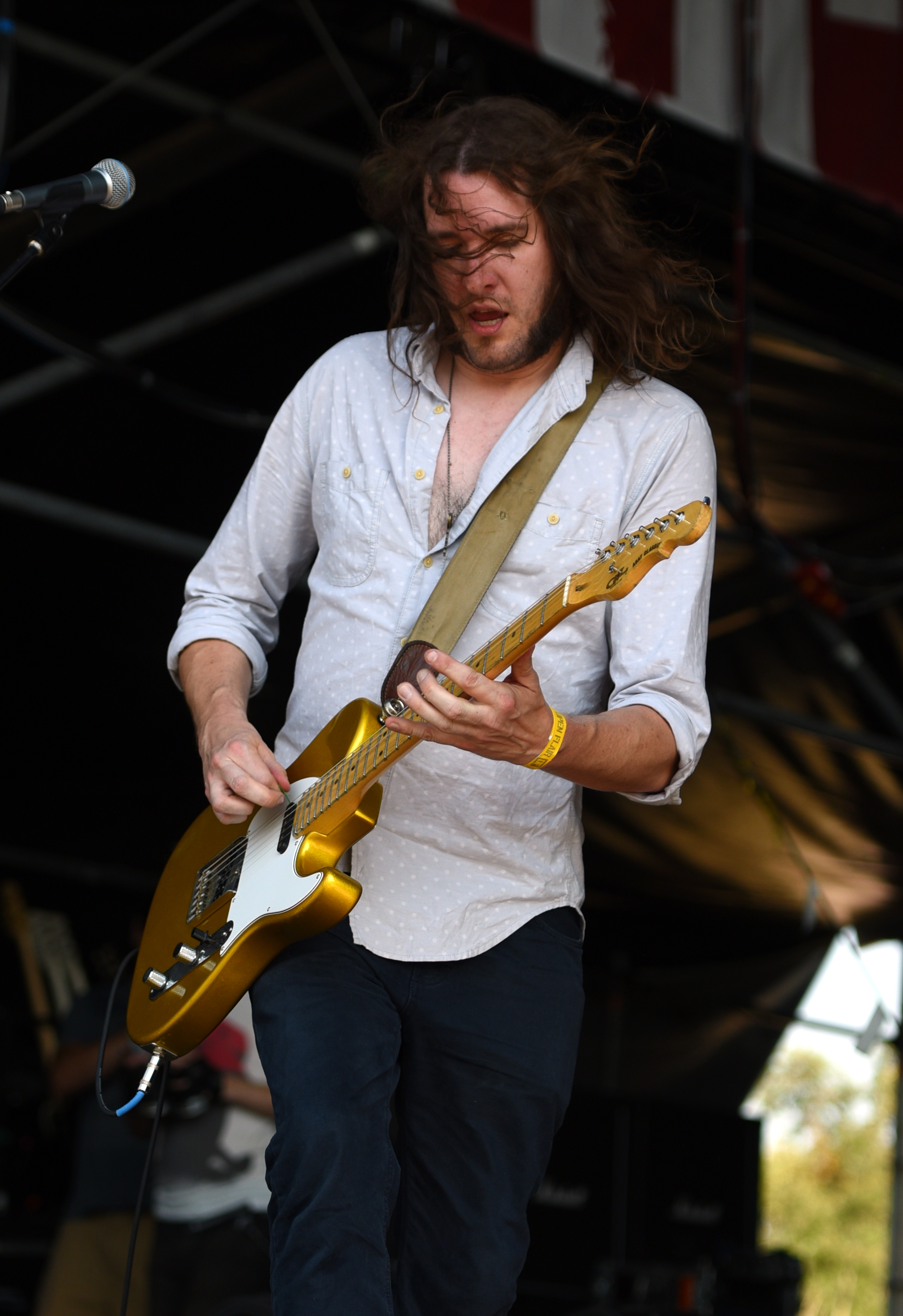
Shawn Eckels playing guitar

=== Albums ===
- Love, You're Just Too Expensive (2010), 2010 Lifeline Promotion
- Road Life Revival (2012), Fro it Out Music
- Just a Good Ole Time (2013), Fro it Out Music
- Half A Man (2014), Fun Machine Records
- Happy Bastards (2016), Ruf Records
- Songs From The Road (CD/DVD set, 2017), Ruf Records
- Change of Pace (February 22, 2019), Fun Machine Records
- Keep On Keepin' On (April 24, 2020), SideOneDummy Records
- Live On The Rocks (September 15, 2021), Fun Machine Records
- Wash, Rinse, Repeat (2022), Fun Machine Records
- L'Optimist (2023), Fun Machine Records/Soundly Music
- Growing Pains (2025), Fun Machine Records

=== EP's ===
- Wash, Rinse, Repeat (2022), Andy Frasco & The U.N.
- Grow Old (2022), Andy Frasco & The U.N.
- Live at Sugarshack Sessions (2023), Sugarshack
- Homesick (songs for younger me) (2026), Fun Machine Records
