= Kendall Street Company =

American rock band

- Origin: Charlottesville, Virginia, U.S.
- Genres: Alternative rock; jam band; folk; psychedelic rock; progressive rock; funk rock
- Years active: 2013–present
- Members: Louis Smith; Brian Roy; Ryan Wood; Ben Laderberg; Jake Vanaman
- Past members: Andrew Drehoff; Price Gillock; Andrew King; Bucky Henry
- Website: kendallstreetcompany.com

Kendall Street Company is an American alternative rock band from Charlottesville, Virginia. The band is known for their energetic and spontaneous live performances as well as their eclectic, irreverent catalog of songs inspired by psychedelia, funk, prog, jam rock, heavy metal, jazz, and folk music.

== History ==
Kendall Street Company was formed in 2013 at the University of Virginia. The band takes their name from Kendall Street Beach in Virginia Beach, where front-man Louis Smith and former saxophonist Andrew Drehoff were raised. Since releasing their eponymous debut EP in 2014 and first full-length album, Earth Turns, in 2016, the band has independently self-released an additional seven studio albums, four live albums, and numerous singles and EPs, an output of nearly 200 original songs which has led to comparisons to other prolific jam outfits including The Grateful Dead and Phish.

The band tours extensively throughout the United States, playing over 100 shows each year. This includes past notable festival performances at Summer Camp Music Festival, Lockn' Festival, FloydFest, The Peach Music Festival, and Suwannee Hulaween. Kendall Street Company is also known for several annual events they host in and around Virginia, including the Lovers Tour, Turkey Jam, and Hot Dog Banger.

== Discography ==
=== Studio albums ===
- Earth Turns (2016, self-released)
- Space for Days (2017, self-released)
- RemoteVision (2018, self-released)
- The Stories We Write for Ourselves (2020, self-released)
- The Year the Earth Stood Still: Ninurta (2021, self-released)
- The Year the Earth Stood Still: Inertia (2021, self-released)
- Untitled California Project (2022, self-released)
- Separation95 (2023)

=== Live albums ===
- The Stories We Write for Ourselves (2021)
- Live at Relix Studios (2022)
- Best Of: Kendall Street Is for Lovers Tour 2022 (2022)
- Live in '25 (2025)

=== As featured artist ===
- Xmas in VA (2024)

== Personnel ==
=== Band members ===
==== Current members ====
- Louis Smith - lead vocals, guitar (2013–present)
- Brian Roy - vocals, bass guitar, upright bass (2013–present)
- Ryan Wood - drums, percussion (2013–present)
- Ben Laderberg - electric guitar (2013–present)
- Jake Vanaman - saxophone, keyboards (2016–present)

==== Former members ====
- Andrew Drehoff - saxophone (2013–2016)
- Bucky Henry - percussion (2013–2016)
- Price Gillock - keyboards (2013–2017)
- Andrew King - vocals, keyboards (2017–2019)
