= Front and Center =

American television series

- Logo
- Country of origin: United States

Production
- Producers: Front and Center Entertainment
- Running time: 60 minutes

Original release
- Release: 2012 – present

Front and Center is an American television series that aired on public television in 2012, presented by PBS member station WLIW. The series was originally called Front Row Center and was developed by the producers of Soundstage. The show features Grammy Award winners, Rock and Roll Hall of Fame Inductees, chart topping artists, and emerging artists. Front and Center profiles some of the music world's better known artists and combines behind the scenes interviews with intimate performances.

== CMA Songwriter Series ==
In 2014, Front and Center joined with the Country Music Association (CMA) to present two separate hour-long concert specials, featuring Nashville country artists. The first episode featured Lady Antebellum and the second was a 10th Anniversary CMA Songwriters Series celebration and featured Dierks Bentley, joined by songwriters Jim Beavers, Ross Copperman, Brett James and Jon Randall. The idea came to fruition when Don Maggi, executive producer of Front and Center, paid a visit to one of the Songwriter Sessions in New York City at Joe's Pub, featuring Kix Brooks of Brooks & Dunn alongside several songwriters. "Hearing the passion and the stories that surround [the songs] was something that captured us and, for lack of a better word, was so real," Maggi told Rolling Stone Country, "That's something that we always try to capture on Front and Center."

== List of episodes ==
Season 2 (2013)
| Episode | Title |
|---|---|
| 201 | Jack Johnson |
| 202 | Train |
| 203 | JJ Grey & Mofro |
| 204 | Preservation Hall Jazz Band |
| 205 | Buddy Guy |
| 206 | Jake Bugg |
| 207 | Zakk Wylde & Les Paul Trio |
| 208 | Rock Candy Funk Party |
| 209 | The Rides |

Season 3 (2014)
| Episode | Title |
|---|---|
| 301 | The Avett Brothers |
| 302 | Jon Batiste and Stay Human |
| 303 | James Blunt |
| 304 | Ginger Baker |
| 305 | Christina Perri |
| 306 | Alt-j |
| 307 | Cyndi Lauper |
| 308 | Grouplove |
| 309 | Here Come the Mummies |
| 310 | Tom Odell |

Season 4 (2014)
| Episode | Title |
|---|---|
| 401 | Counting Crows |
| 402 | John Hiatt |
| 403 | CMA Songwriter Series with Dierks Bentley |
| 404 | Joe Satriani |
| 405 | CMA Presents Lady Antebellum |
| 406 | Keith Urban: The Hits |
| 407 | Paul Rodgers |
| 408 | The Fray |
| 409 | Richard Thompson |
| 410 | Richie Sambora |

Season 5 (2015)
| Episode | Title |
|---|---|
| 501 | CMA Songwriter Series: Hunter Hayes |
| 502 | CMA Songwriter Series: Bob DiPiero featuring Brandy Clark |
| 503 | CMA Songwriter Series: Sara Evans and Martina McBride "Ladies Night Out" |
| 504 | CMA Songwriter Series: Little Big Town |
| 505 | Zakk Wylde |
| 506 | Train |
| 507 | The Rides |
| 508 | Trey Anastasio |
| 509 | For King & Country |
| 510 | Warren Haynes |

Season 6 (2016)
| Episode | Title |
|---|---|
| 601 | Joe Jackson |
| 602 | CMA Songwriter Series: Darius Rucker |
| 603 | CMA Songwriter Series: Ronnie Dunn |
| 604 | CMA Songwriter Series: Kip Moore |
| 605 | George Ezra |
| 606 | Børns |
| 607 | CMA Songwriter Series: Brett Eldredge |
| 608 | CMA Songwriter Series: Steven Tyler |

Season 7 (2017)
| Episode | Title |
|---|---|
| 701 | Rob Thomas |
| 702 | Shawn Mendes |
| 703 | Cheap Trick |
| 704 | Southside Johnny |
| 705 | Steve Vai |
| 706 | The Cadillac Three |
| 707 | Kaleo |
| 708 | Dawes |
| 709 | CMA Songwriter Series: Jennifer Nettles |

Season 8 (2018)
| Episode | Title |
|---|---|
| 801 | Liam Gallagher |
| 802 | CMA Songwriter Series: Kane Brown & Luke Combs |
| 803 | Mike & the Mechanics |
| 804 | Beth Hart |
| 805 | CMA Songwriter Series: Miranda Lambert |
| 806 | Sheryl Crow |
| 807 | Seal |
| 808 | Jack Johnson |
| 809 | CMA Songwriter Series: Clint Black |
| 810 | Nile Rodgers |
