= The Motet =

American funk and soul band

- Origin: Denver, Colorado
- Genres: Funk, rock, jazz, Afro-beat
- Years active: 1998–present
- Labels: aNOnym reCOrds, Harmonized Records
- Members: Dave Watts; Ryan Jalbert; Joey Porter; Garrett Sayers; Drew Sayers; Sarah Clarke
- Past members: Dominic Lalli; Jans Ingber; Matt Pitts; Mike Tiernen; Kurt Reeber; Steve Vidiac; Scott Messersmith; Gregoire Raymond; Mark Donovan; Adam Revell; Matt Spencer; Gabe Mervine; Alex Tomaino; Lyle Divinsky; Parris Fleming; Joshua Cliburn
- Website: themotet.net

The Motet is an American funk, soul and jazz influenced group based in Denver, Colorado. Founded in 1998 by drummer and bandleader Dave Watts, The Motet is Watts, guitarist Ryan Jalbert, bassist Garrett Sayers, keyboardist Joey Porter, saxophonist Drew Sayers and singer Sarah Clarke.

Known for energetic live shows including an annual Halloween concert, the band has released seven studio albums. Their 2014 self-titled album was co-written and produced by all the band members, and was cut on analog recording equipment to capture their instruments' live sounds. They continue to tour nationally and have performed at festivals such as Bonnaroo, Electric Forest Festival, High Sierra Music Festival, North Coast Music Festival, Wakarusa, Rooster Walk, and Summer Camp Festival.

== History ==
=== 1998–2004: Founding and first albums ===
The Motet was founded in Boulder, Colorado, in 1998 by drummer and arranger Dave Watts as a musical collective with a rotating cast of musicians. By 2000 the group had changed its name to The Motet and become a sextet consisting of Watts on drums, percussionist and vocalist Jans Ingber, percussionist Scott Messersmith, guitarist Mike Tiernen, bassist Kurt Reeber, and organist-keyboardist Steve Vidiac. Watts, Ingber, and Messersmith had also traveled to Cuba twice to study bata drums of the Santeria religion, which at the time heavily influenced the band's sound, as can be heard on their first two albums.

The Dave Watts Motet first performed together on Halloween 1998, and at that time were incorporating elements of funk, jazz, folk, and world music into their sound. Watts wrote and arranged the majority of their early music for a rotating lineup of musicians, throwing energetic local dance parties. Their debut release, Breathe, was self-released in 1999, and produced entirely by Watts.

The band released their second album, Play, on aNOnym reCOrds in 2001, which was followed in 2002 by the album Live, their first record on Harmonized Records. Music for Life, released in 2004, was also on Harmonized Records. Also in 2004, the band self-released the DVD Shine, which was produced by James Marshello.

=== 2006: Instrumental Dissent ===
On September 12, 2006, they released their studio album Instrumental Dissent. While the album is largely instrumental, the voices of activists such as Harry Belafonte, Alice Walker, and Noam Chomsky are woven into many of the songs. Allmusic gave release 3.5/5 stars and largely positive review, writing "Motet gets off to an impressive start as the opening salvo of tunes darts between funk, Afro-beat, Latin and world sounds with a slight underpinning of electronic touches, all driven by a nimble yet fiery attack." Allmusic praised the production and audio quality as well, stating "Many of the tracks blend into each other, creating a near seamless whole." Allmusic criticized the slower pace in the latter half of the disc, stating the album "loses some of the imagination, if not steam, of the early tunes, becoming a solid yet rather conventional work from a jazz-funk fusion outfit." However, "Scott Messersmith's bubbling percussion and drummer Dave Watts' elastic beats keep the heat turned up even when the tracks tend to extend longer than needed."

=== 2009: Dig Deep ===
Around half of The Motet's self-released 2009 album Dig Deep features compositions written and arranged by Watts, with the drummer turned producer utilizing Ableton Live to add an electronica sound to various tracks. Allmusic gave Dig Deep 3/5 stars, stating "Covers of three Fela Kuti tunes show that this funk-world ensemble's heart lies in the tough, often horn-driven Afro-beat that dominates this set." The review acknowledges the new touches of techno, stating that Watts expands the band's sound, "in particular toward Kraftwerk-styled techno at times, also pushing into spacy areas that will likely be a bit alienating to some longtime fans." Much of the album also relies on "percussive Afro-funk" and Allmusic pointed out elements of prog rock on tracks such as "Guru."

=== 2014: The Motet ===
They released their seventh studio album, The Motet, in February 2014. Each member of the band contributed to the writing process, with hundreds of hours spent in the studio creating vintage funk sounds. The group came up with the basic ideas for the album's original nine tracks in Watts's home studio, then recorded and mixed the album at Immersive Studios in Boulder, Colorado and Scanhope Sound in Littleton, Colorado. About The Motet, Watts says "The album is really like a new era for us. Writing our own music as a band, a 100 percent collaborative effort, it’s a real stepping stone to a sound we’re going to be bringing consistently” Writes Dave Kirby of the Boulder Weekly, “utterly flawless production...and not a throwaway in the bunch...ambitious, airtight and built to travel.” Upstate Live says that The Motet’s “55 glorious minutes showcase their growth as individuals and as an unstoppable funk machine.”

=== 2016: Totem ===
The Motet's record was released on July 8, 2016. The album was recorded at The Parlor Recording Studio in New Orleans, Scanhope Sound, Colorado Sound, Notably Fine Audio, and Halo Studios. Eric Krasno of Soullive produced the record and contributed two songs "So High" and "Know It Too Well".

=== 2019: Death or Devotion ===
This album was released in the beginning of 2019.

=== 2023: All Day & New Singer ===
In 2023 The Motet released the instrumental album "All Day". On July, 24th they announced Sarah Clarke as their new singer.

=== Live performances ===
External videos
- The Motet "Closed Mouth Don't Get Fed" Live (May 2, 2014)
- "123" by The Motet, The Fillmore, Denver (April 20, 2013)
- "Like We Own It" Red Rocks (July 5, 2015)
- "The Truth" Jam in the Van (Summer 2016)

The band has toured annually since its founding, primarily performing in the United States with six or seven live members and Dave Watts serving as bandleader.

They periodically bring special guests on stage; in January 2014, for example, they were joined on stage by drummer Jason Hann of the String Cheese Incident, trumpeter Jen Hartswick, and vocalist and jazz trombonist Natalie Cressman.

In 2013 they played in Chicago, and performed at the now-defunct Wakarusa Music and Camping Festival. The following year the band toured the United States in support of their album The Motet, performing at festivals such as Summer Camp Festival.

== Halloween concerts ==
Since 2001 The Motet has performed a series of concerts on Halloween weekend, typically in Colorado, covering the music of one particular band and dressing the part. Examples have included Earth, Wind, and Fire, Parliament Funkadelic, Tower of Power, Jamiroquai, Stevie Wonder, and Prince.

The following is a list of their annual Halloween concerts:

- 2000: The Beatles
- 2001: The Headhunters
- 2002: Stevie Wonder
- 2003: Tower of Power
- 2004: Prince
- 2005: Michael Jackson
- 2006: Madonna
- 2007: Jamiroquai
- 2008: Talking Heads
- 2009: Sly and the Family Stone
- 2010: Earth, Wind and Fire
- 2011: Grateful Dead (Funk is Dead)
- 2012: Parliament/Funkadelic
- 2013: The Year 1980 (Mixtape 1980)
- 2014: The Year 1975 (Mixtape 1975)
- 2015: The Year 1977 (Mixtape 1977)
- 2016: The Year 1979 (Mixtape 1979)

== Members ==
Current

- Dave Watts – drums, bandleader (1998–present)
- Ryan Jalbert – guitar (2005–present)
- Joey Porter – keys (2006–present)
- Garrett Sayers – bass (2002–present)
- Drew Sayers – tenor sax (2016–present)
- Sarah Clarke – vocals (2023–present)

Past

- Gabe Mervine – trumpet (2009–2018)
- Jans Ingber – vocalist, percussion (2000–2015)
- Matt Pitts – tenor sax (2010–2015)
- Dominic Lalli (Big Gigantic member) – saxophone (2003–2006, also contributor)
- Scott Messersmith – percussion (1998–2011)
- Gregoire Raymond – keys (2002–2004)
- Adam Revell – keys (2005–2008)
- Mark Donovan – guitar (2003–2005)
- Mike Tiernan – guitar (2000–2003)
- Steve Vidiac – organist/keyboardist (2000–2002)
- Paul McDaniel – bass (2001–2002)
- Kurt Reeber – bass (2000–2001)
- Matt Spencer – bass (1998–1999)
- Alex Tomaino – guitar (1998)
- Lyle Divinsky – vocalist (2016–2020)
- Parris Fleming – trumpet (2018–2020)

== Discography ==
=== Albums ===
Albums by The Motet
Year	Album title	Release details
1999	Breathe	Released: April 30, 2002; Label: Self-released; Format: CD
2001	Play	Released: April 10, 2001; Label: aNOnym reCOrds; Format: CD
2004	Music for Life	Released: July 21, 2004; Label: Harmonized Records; Format: CD, digital
2006	Instrumental Dissent	Released: September 12, 2006; Label: Self-released; Format: CD, digital
2009	Dig Deep	Released: August 25, 2009; Label: Self-released; Format: CD, digital
2014	The Motet	Released: February 11, 2014; Label: Self-released; Format: CD, digital
2016	Totem	Released: July 8, 2016; Label: Self-released; Format: CD, digital, vinyl
2019	Death Or Devotion	Released: January 25, 2019; Label: Self-released; Format: CD, digital, vinyl
2023	All Day	Released: January 18, 2023; Label: Self-released; Format: CD, digital

=== Live albums ===
Albums by The Motet
Year	Album title	Release details
2005	The Motet (Live)	Released: May 17, 2005; Label: Harmonized Records; Format: digital

=== DVDs ===
DVDs by The Motet
Year	Album title	Release details
2004	Shine DVD	Released: 2005; Label: Home Grown Music; Format: DVD

== See also ==
- Funk music
