= Caravan of Thieves =

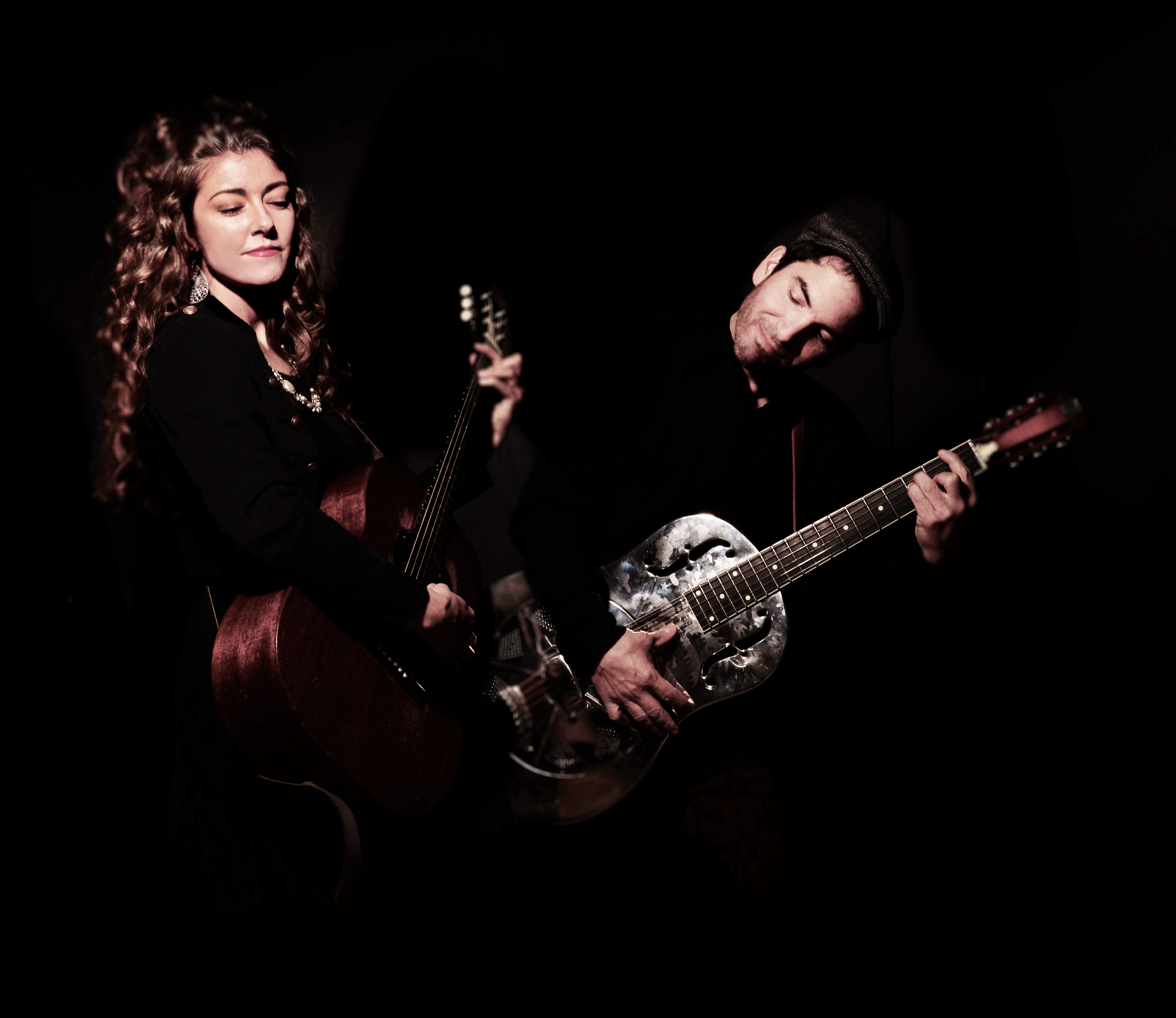
- Fuzz and Carrie of Caravan of Thieves

Background information
- Origin: Bridgeport, Connecticut
- Genres: Gypsy, swing, jazz, folk
- Years active: 2008–present
- Members: Fuzz Sangiovanni; Carrie Sangiovanni (Linsky); Plus Various Members
- Past members: Ben Dean; Brian Anderson
- Website: www.caravanofthieves.com

Caravan of Thieves is a gypsy-swing four-piece group based in Bridgeport, Connecticut. Their music has been described as “gypsy flavored song writing [with] high intensity [shows].” Caravan of Thieves has toured with renowned artists such as Emmylou Harris, Dan Hicks, Glen Campbell, Nanci Griffith, The Decemberists, Keb Mo, Tom Tom Club, Iron and Wine, Punch Brothers, Tony Trischka, John Hammond, and John Jorgenson. Caravan of Thieves puts on humorous, theatrical performances, inviting the audience to join in by stomping, clapping, and singing along.

== Biography ==
Caravan of Thieves began as a duo consisting of Fuzz Sangiovanni (of Deep Banana Blackout fame) and Carrie Sangiovanni. The two quickly discovered their voices blended quite well with one another. Fuzz said, "It started as a romantic, bohemian vision of a couple making music, performing on the road, in parks, venues, traveling around and avoiding responsibility as much as possible...The first thing we discovered was we loved singing together, harmonizing our voices. Just seemed to click right away."

The (now former) couple added violinist Ben Dean and bass player Brian Anderson in 2008 and the band released their debut album Bouquet in 2009. Their second album, Mischief Night (2010) was recorded at a sold-out show in Fairfield, Connecticut.

Caravan of Thieves signed with New York-based record label, United for Opportunity, for the release of their third album, The Funhouse, on February 28, 2012. Fuzz discussed the group’s third album saying, “We had a concept going in, both from a sound and production standpoint, lyrically and thematically. A lot of crazy stuff happens on the road, and we took our experiences from on and off the stage, and brought them into the studio with us. Life is wild and unpredictable, all our lives, like an amusement park ride. In this case, we picked a funhouse. And we wanted to expand the range of what we can do instrumentally but still keep it non electric so we added a few more gritty and twangy stringed instruments that were fun to spank, like banjos, resonator guitars and ukuleles, as well as an orchestra of kitchen appliances for some additional percussive bang.”

The music video for the first single "Raise the Dead" premiered on American Songwriter on March 8, 2012. Discussing the video, Fuzz told Spinner.com “We like writing songs about ghosts and afterlife, but this was the first one that had a big communal sing-along, clap-along feel to it. It needed to be, since it's about throwing a big party for all the deceased and honoring them for their life's achievements and impact. We perform it live this way, get off stage, unplug completely, get the crowd to surround us, and stomp, clap and sing along. We recorded it this way for the album and made a video with the same feel, in a really old theater and cemetery."

"Raise the Dead" is also featured in the second episode of Creature Commandos, "The Tourmaline Necklace."

== Members ==
The band members are:

- Fuzz Sangiovanni - vocals, guitar, percussion
- Carrie Sangiovanni - vocals, guitar
- Plus various members on violin, double bass, accordion, trumpet, percussion

== Discography ==
YEAR	ALBUM	LABEL	REF
2009	Bouquet	Self-released	
2010	Mischief Night	Self-released	
2012	The Funhouse	United for Opportunity	
2015	Kiss Kiss	Buskaroo	

== External resources ==
- Caravan of Thieves website
