= The Main Squeeze =

American funk band

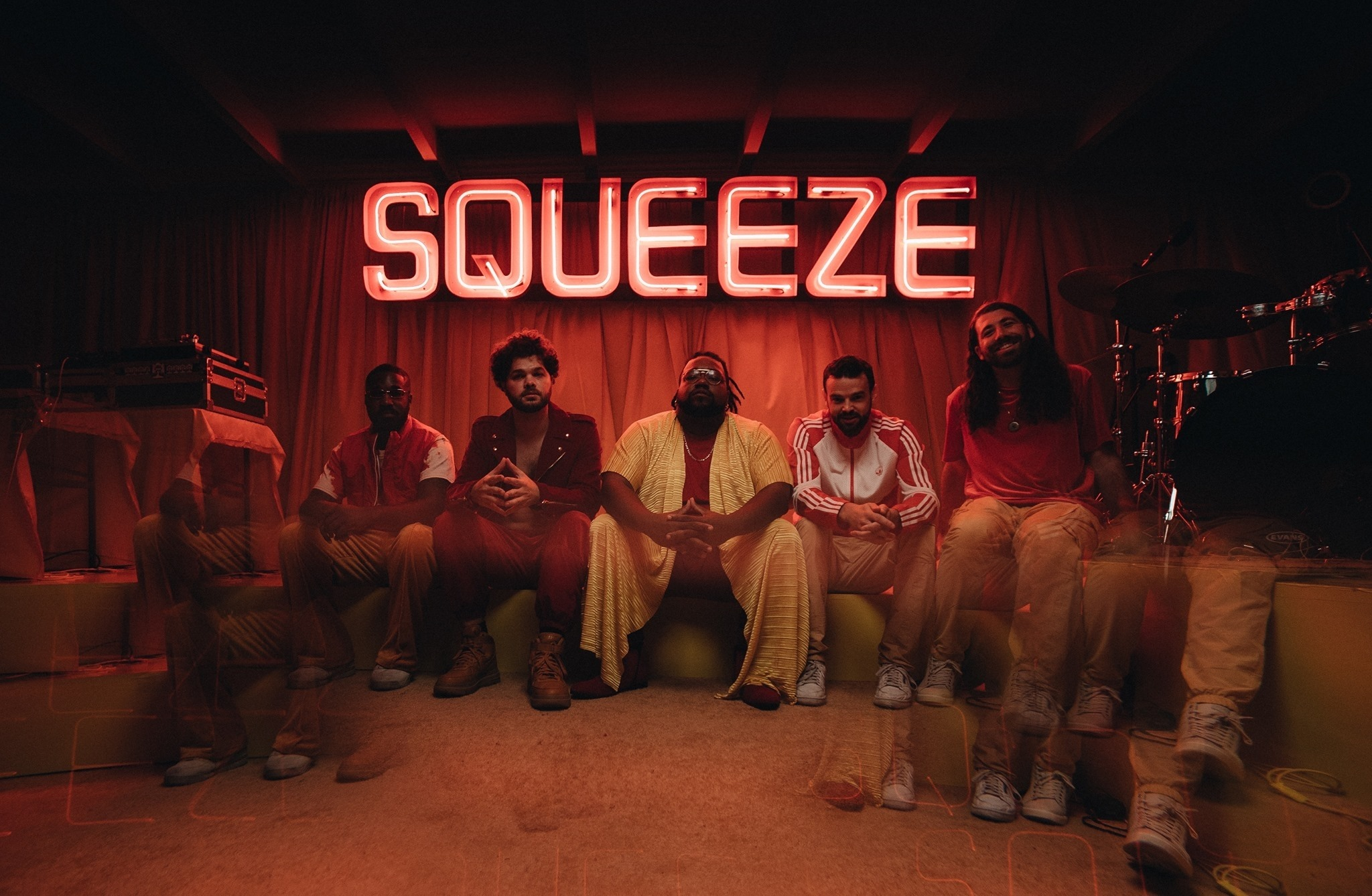

Background information
- Origin: Bloomington, Indiana
- Genres: Funk rock
- Years active: 2009–present
- Members: Corey Frye; Ben “Smiley” Silverstein; Maximillian Newman; Reuben Gingrich; Rob Skywalker (Walker)
- Past members: Will Rob; Bradley Friedman; Jeremiah Hunt; Kevin Grove
- Website: www.mainsqueezemusic.com

The Main Squeeze is an American funk band from Bloomington, Indiana.

== History ==
The Main Squeeze formed as a party band at Indiana University in 2010. In 2012, they released their first self-titled LP. Three years later, they released their second full-length album titled Mind Your Head. The album was produced by producer Randy Jackson. In 2017, The Main Squeeze released their third full-length album titled Without a Sound. In 2020, the band released their fourth full-length album titled 12345. In 2022, the band released their fifth full-length album titled To Be Determined.

== Band members ==
Current members

- Corey Frye (vocals, keys)
- Ben “Smiley” Silverstein (keys, keytar)
- Maximillian Newman (guitar)
- Reuben Gingrich (drums)
- Rob "Skywalker" Walker (bass, keys, vocals)

Former members

- Will Rob (bass, vocals)
- Bradley Friedman (drums)
- Jeremiah Hunt (bass, vocals)
- Kevin Grove (vocals, rhythm guitar)

== Discography ==
The Main Squeeze discography
- Studio albums: 6
- EPs: 1
- Live albums: 5
- Singles: 15

=== Albums ===
==== Studio albums ====
Title	Album details
The Main Squeeze	Released: June 2, 2012; Label: Format: CD, digital download
Mind Your Head	Released: September 18, 2015; Label: Format: CD, digital download, streaming
Without a Sound	Released: April 28, 2017; Label: Format: Digital download, streaming
1 2 3 4 5	Released: July 19, 2020; Label: Format: Digital download, streaming (Bandcamp only)
To Be Determined	Released: April 1, 2022; Label: Format: Digital download, streaming
The Vibetape	Released: November 24, 2023; Label: Format: Digital download, streaming; (Collaboration with Smile High)
Panorama	Released: January 9, 2025; Label: Format: Digital download, streaming

==== Live albums ====
Title	Album details
The Main Squeeze on Audiotree Live	Released: 2015; Label: Format: Digital download, streaming
Jam in the Van - The Main Squeeze	Released: 2016; Label: Format: Digital download, streaming
Squeeze Live, Vol. 1	Released: October 9, 2017; Label: Released: Digital download, streaming
Squeeze Live, Vol. 2	Released: August 1, 2019; Label: Format: Digital download, streaming
To Be Determined: LIVE	Released: July 14, 2023; Label: Format: Digital download, streaming

=== Extended Plays ===
Title	Album details
First Drops	Released: March 5, 2011; Label: Format: Digital download

=== Singles ===
Title	Year	Album
"Message to the Lonely"	2014	Mind Your Head
"It Ain't Me"	2018	Non-album singles
"Fancy Clothes" (featuring Teddy Roxpin)	2019	Non-album singles
"Sweet Divine"	2020	1 2 3 4 5
"Little Bit"	2020	1 2 3 4 5
"Karma"	2020	1 2 3 4 5
"This World" (featuring Gallant)	2020	1 2 3 4 5
"The Roux"	2020	Non-album single
"Sunday Morning"	2021	To Be Determined
"Go to Work"	2021	To Be Determined
"Payday"	2021	To Be Determined
"Make It Right"	2022	To Be Determined
"Believe"	2022	To Be Determined
"Make It Right (COFRESI Remix)"	2022	Non-album singles
"317.323"	2023	Non-album singles
