= Everyone Orchestra =

Improvisational musical project

- Everyone Orchestra performing at Xingolati - Groove Cruise of the Pacific Long Beach, California to Ensenada, Mexico in 2005

Background information
- Origin: San Francisco, California, United States
- Genres: Rock, improvisational, jam band
- Years active: 2001 - Present
- Members: Matt Butler; Various
- Website: www.everyoneorchestra.com

Everyone Orchestra is an American improvisational musical project that features a constantly revolving roster of musicians. Everyone Orchestra creates completely different music every time it appears through conducted improvisational musical exploration and audience participation.

Everyone Orchestra is led and conducted by musician, multi-instrumentalist and activist Matt Butler. Butler conceived the project in 2001 after traveling the country extensively in the 1990s as the drummer and percussionist for the touring band Jambay.

Everyone Orchestra has appeared at top-level summer music festivals as well as individual shows and benefit performances around the country. Shows sometimes include live painters and performance artists alongside the musicians. Performances by Everyone Orchestra have featured members of The Grateful Dead, Phish, moe., The String Cheese Incident, The Flecktones, ALO, Tea Leaf Green, Living Colour and Dave Mathews Band among others.

Through benefit events for charitable causes, Everyone Orchestra has raised more than $100,000 in contributions for non-profit and environmental organizations around the nation.

== Beginnings ==
Matt Butler got the idea for what has become Everyone Orchestra while traveling in India. While in the country on vacation, he attended a multi-national open-mic night, and was exposed to a large number of different musicians, most of whom didn't speak the same language, playing together and communicating purely through music and improvisation.

Upon returning home to the San Francisco bay area, Butler began hosting open-mic nights aimed at achieving the same kind of purely musical communication. Inviting various musicians to come down to take part in large-scale improvisational evenings, Butler refined the process of conducted improvisation, eventually taking the concept beyond open-mic night jam sessions, booking the first official Everyone Orchestra concert for New Year's Eve in 2001. Butler was also inspired by musical visionaries and projects that previously incorporated conducted improvisation such as Zambiland Orchestra conducted by Ricky Keller, Butch Morris's Conduction, John Zorn's Cobra and others.

== The music ==
There is usually little formal rehearsal for an appearance of Everyone Orchestra. The music is mainly improvised, with the various members of the band (as well we the audience) taking cues from a conductor. In addition to using hand signals and vocal cues, the conductor makes use of white boards to guide what would be a cacophonous mass-improvisation into a coherent musical journey. The musicians performing will very often be appearing on stage together for the first time, so by taking cues from the conductor as well as their fellow musicians, Everyone Orchestra strives to create something new and different each time they perform. The audience is as much a part of an Everyone Orchestra performance as the musicians on stage. Urged by cues from the conductor, the audience will be asked to sing, make sound effects, become louder or softer, and becomes a large part of the performance.
