= Future Rock =

Chicago-based electronic rock trio

- Origin: Chicago, Illinois, United States
- Genres: Electronic
- Years active: 2004–present
- Labels: 1320 Records
- Members: Darren Heitz (drums) Mickey Kellerman (keyboards) Felix Moreno (bass)
- Website: www.futurerock.net

Future Rock (or shortened as FR) is an electronic rock trio hailing from Chicago, Illinois. The band consists of Felix Moreno playing the bass guitar and the synthesizer, Mickey Kellerman plays the keyboards, and Darren Heitz plays the drums. Future Rock mixes standard live rock instrumentation with electronics. Their style of music is classified as electronica, but fuses elements of progressive house and dance-rock. Their music is often intense and quirky, yet very danceable.

Future Rock has released five albums and toured the US nationally with a heavy presence in the music festival circuit.

== History ==
Future Rock formed in early 2004 (Kellerman and Moreno had formerly been members of the Evanston-based experimental rock group Co-Dependant Origination). Future Rock's debut album, Sugar Coated Bullets, was self-released on May 9, 2006. In March 2007, Future Rock signed to Harmonized Records and released the album Gears. In May 2010, Future Rock released Live In Wicker Park, a recording from a live performance on Harmonized Records. In April 2011, Future Rock self-released the album Nights in April 2011, and in early 2012 signed with 1320 Records, a label run by Sound Tribe Sector 9. 1320 Records re-released Nights with some additional remixes, and in July 2012, Future Rock released One Day on 1320 Records.

Future Rock enjoyed a breakout year in 2006, performing at many of the largest music festivals in the US, including High Sierra and Wakarusa. In August 2006, the band performed two sets at Camp Bisco V, including one set of original music and a late-night set where they performed as Aphex Rock, playing the music of Aphex Twin.

== Discography ==
- Sugar Coated Bullets - 2006
- Gears - 2007
- Live In Wicker Park - 2010
- Nights - 2011
- One Day - 2012
- Daft Rock Live - 2016
- Long Ago - 2016
