= SoDown =

American electronic music producer, musician and DJ

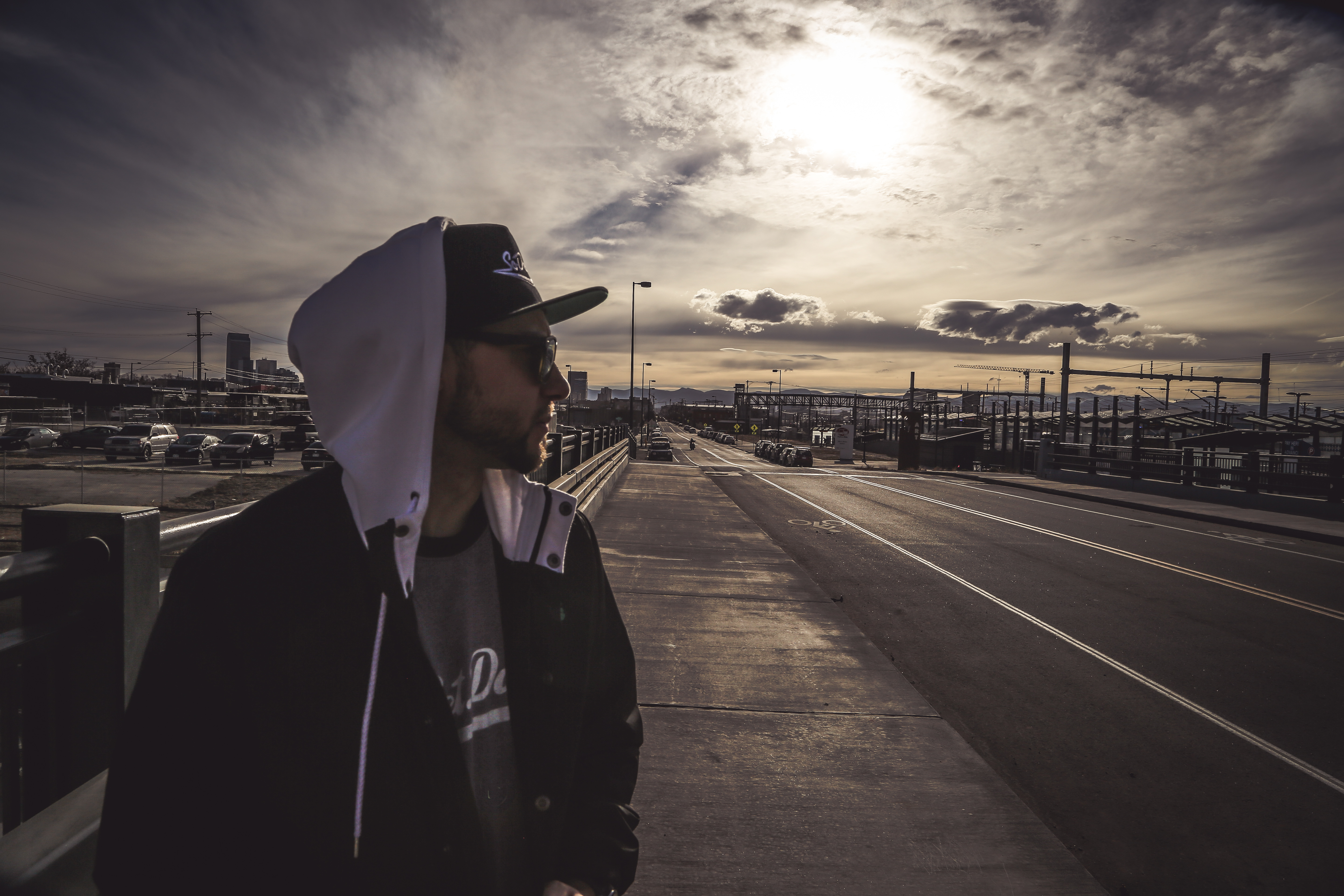
SoDown aka Ehren Wright

Ehren River Wright (born December 17, 1989), known by his stage name SoDown, is an American electronic music producer, DJ, and saxophone player.

== Early life ==
As a Boulder, Colorado native, Ehren Wright (SoDown) grew up listening to hip hop, funk, soul, and reggae, drawing on influences from Wu-tang Clan, Method Man, The Meters, Parliament, and James Brown.

== Career ==
Wright began his exploration into electronic music after seeing Pretty Lights perform at Red Rocks Amphitheatre in Morrison, Colorado in 2010. In 2017, SoDown announced his debut performance at the very place he had become introduced to the scene performing at Red Rocks Amphitheatre supporting Pretty Lights on August 11, 2017. "Red Rocks kick started my whole interest in music. It really pushed me in this direction, so to come back and play with Pretty Lights and Manic Focus was full circle".
