= Yamn =

Yamn يَمَنْ
- village
- Location within Iran
- Coordinates: 33°41′00″N 50°13′53″E
- Country: Iran
- Province: Markazi
- County: Khomeyn
- Bakhsh: Central
- Rural District: Galehzan

Population (2006)
  - Total: 175
- Time zone: UTC+3:30 (IRST)
  - Summer (DST): UTC+4:30 (IRDT)

Yamn (Persian: يَمَنْ, also Romanized as Yaman) is a village in Galehzan Rural District, in the Central District of Khomeyn County, Markazi Province, Iran. At the 2006 census, its population was 175, in 58 families.
