= Saxsquatch =

American musician

- Born: Dean Mitchell
- Origin: Chapel Hill, North Carolina, U.S.
- Occupation: Musician
- Instruments: saxophone, keyboard, double bass, programming, sampling, drum machine
- Years active: 2019–present
- Label: Monstercat
- Website: saxsquatch.com

Dean Mitchell, better known by his stage name Saxsquatch, is an American musician known for playing original and cover versions of songs on the saxophone while wearing a Bigfoot costume. Mitchell is a multi-instrumentalist, producer, and electronic music artist from North Carolina. He has appeared in a number of viral videos and amassed a large social media following.

== Career ==
Mitchell began uploading his Saxsquatch performances to YouTube in 2019 and his cover of Daft Punk's One More Time went viral. His cover of You Don't Know Me was featured on Tosh.0. By September 2020, his videos averaged 3–5 million views per day on social media and he became one the top solo artists on the Pollstar livestream charts. His music has been described as "a full-on mash-up of live instrumental saxophone, upright bass, and funky electronic beats."

Mitchell played saxophone with The Marcus King Band until 2020.

In October 2020, Saxsquatch commenced the Saxual Healing Tour 2020, which featured outdoor concerts at multiple venues. By early 2021, his "Live From The Woods" performances became Facebook's top recurring music stream. In 2021, Saxsquatch and John Oates collaborated to create an electronic dance music cover of the Hall & Oates' 1982 song Maneater. The duo live streamed the song together on March 20, 2021. Saxsquatch and Half an Orange collaborated and released the single Moondance, which was featured in the videogame Rocket League in 2021. On January 31, 2022, Saxsquatch appeared on episode six of That's My Jam hosted by comedian Jimmy Fallon.

In 2024, on the "Bigfoot Rave" tour added a laser show to an already dynamic set. In 2025, the "Footprints" tour sold out 27 shows across the United States, ending at a sold-out show in Denver at Cervantes Ballroom.

== Philanthropy ==
In 2024, Mitchell worked with the town of Chapel Hill to create "Cryptids with a Cause", a free concert combined with a food drive benefiting PORCH, an organization that distributes food to local schools and over 700 families monthly.

This event encouraged attendees to dress as "something they believe in", and costumes included cryptids, aliens, and merfolk.
