= Hot Buttered Rum (band) =

American progressive bluegrass group

- Also known as: Hot Buttered Rum String Band
- Origin: San Francisco Bay Area
- Genres: Folk, Progressive Bluegrass, Rock
- Years active: 2002–present
- Labels: Self-released, Harmonized
- Members: Bryan Horne; Erik Yates; Nat Keefe; Jeff Coleman; Lucas Carlton; Ben Andrews
- Past members: Aaron Redner; James Stafford; Ian Waight; Zachary Matthews; Matt Butler; Rob Hooper; Shane Schlick; Zebulon Bowles
- Website: http://www.hotbutteredrum.net

Hot Buttered Rum (also known as Hot Buttered Rum String Band and HBRSB) is an American six-piece progressive bluegrass act based in the San Francisco Bay Area.

The group performs frequently at music festivals, including the Telluride Bluegrass Festival, Newport Folk Festival, South by Southwest, High Sierra Music Festival, Bonnaroo Music Festival, Grey Fox Bluegrass Festival, and Hardly Strictly Bluegrass Festival. They have also headlined The Fillmore in their home city of San Francisco and have performed with a wide array of artists, including Phil Lesh, Ben Harper, Chris Thile, Bela Fleck, Peter Rowan, and Bill Nershi.

Their song "Right Between Your Eyes" gained national prominence when it was selected to serve as the theme music for the TV show, "Cook's Country from America's Test Kitchen" during seasons one through 11.

== Discography ==
- Live at the Freight and Salvage (2002)

(recorded live at Berkeley's premier listening venue The Freight and Salvage)
1. Backrooms of My Mind
2. Elephant Hunting Song
3. Red-Haired Boy
4. String's Breath
5. The Trial of John Walker Lindh
6. Norwegian Wood
7. Warm Up
8. Naked Blue
9. Red Clay Halo
10. The Crest

- In These Parts (2004)

(HBR's first studio effort recorded in the hills of Fairfax, California)
1. Three Point Two
2. Flask, Alas!
3. Evolution
4. Old Dangerfield
5. I've Let Go
6. Lighten Up Your Load
7. Horseshoe
8. Reckless Tex
9. Immaculate Rain
10. In These Parts

- Well Oiled Machine (2006)

1. Firefly
2. Guns or Butter
3. Idaho Pines
4. Poison Oak
5. Waterpocket Fold
6. Always Be the Moon
7. Well-Oiled Machine
8. Waiting for a Squall
9. Butch & Peggy
10. Sweet Honey Fountain
11. Wedding Day

- Live in the Northeast (2007)

1. Busted in Utah
2. Limbo in Lovelock
3. Desert Rat
4. Return Someday
5. Cumberland Blues
6. Metrosexual
7. Summertime Gal
8. California Snow & Rain
9. Spider
10. Queen Elizabeth
11. Honey Be
12. You Make Me Feel Like Dancing

- Limbs Akimbo (2010)

1. Two Loose Cannons
2. Something New
3. Beneath the Blossoms
4. A Great Many Things
5. Brokedown
6. Sexy Bakery Girl
7. Queen Elizabeth
8. Turning the Wheel
9. Honkytonk Tequila
10. Summertime Gal
11. Limbs Akimbo

- Live In The Sierra (2012)

1. Fruit of the Vine
2. Squall
3. Way Back When
4. Blue Moon Stars
5. Banished Set
6. Beyond the Sky
7. Ramblin' Girl
8. Be Kind Boys
9. Like the French
10. Loretta
11. Cody
12. Where the Streets Have No Name
13. Desert Rat
14. Lovelight

- Hot Buttered Rum (2014)

1. Working Man
2. Let the Love Come Through Me
3. Blackberry Pie
4. Another City
5. The Love You Gave Away
6. What Old Woman
7. Genie's Loose
8. The Crest
9. Mountain Song
10. Diamonds in the Wind
11. Every Side of the Coin
12. Doctor's Daughter

- Kite & the Key (2016)

1. Weary Ways
2. I Wanna Know
3. Maybe I Just Feel That Way
4. First Rodeo
5. So Much
6. You Be the Fiddle
7. Pig In A Pen
8. Ramshackle Shack
9. A Lonesome Night
10. How Mountain Girls Can Love
11. Red Wicked Wine
12. Unclouded Day
13. Cherry Lake
14. Music's Been Good To Me
15. Desert Rat
16. A Great Many Things
17. Middle Country Stars
18. House On the Hill

- Something Beautiful (2020)

1. Another Man's Song
2. Highway Sign
3. Something Beautiful
4. Good One Gone
5. What DO I Know
6. The Trial of John Walker Lindh
7. Lay Me Down a Pallet On Your Floor
8. Well-Oiled Machine
9. Church Is Where You Make It
10. Dovetail Joint

- Lonesome Panoramic (2021)

1. You Can Tell
2. Sittin’ Here Alone
3. Country Tunes & Love Songs
4. How Short the Song 3:27
5. Treasure Island Blues
6. Never Got Married
7. Spirits Still Come
8. Sleeping Giants
9. Leaving Dallas
10. When that Lonesome Feeling Comes
11. Mighty Fine
12. The One that Everybody Knows
13. The Deep End

- Uphill Highway (2025)

1. Uphill Highway
2. Outside Looking In
3. Sturgeon Moon
4. Outrage Machine
5. Not Falling For It
6. Time To Rise
7. Lucky Doing This At All
8. Any Other Way
9. Let’s Fall Apart Together
10. Rearview Mirror

Additional Associations: The Overall Experience, Nat Keefe Concert Carnival and Erik Yates Project
