= Wakarusa Music and Camping Festival =

Defunct music festival held in Kansas

Wakarusa Music & Camping Festival
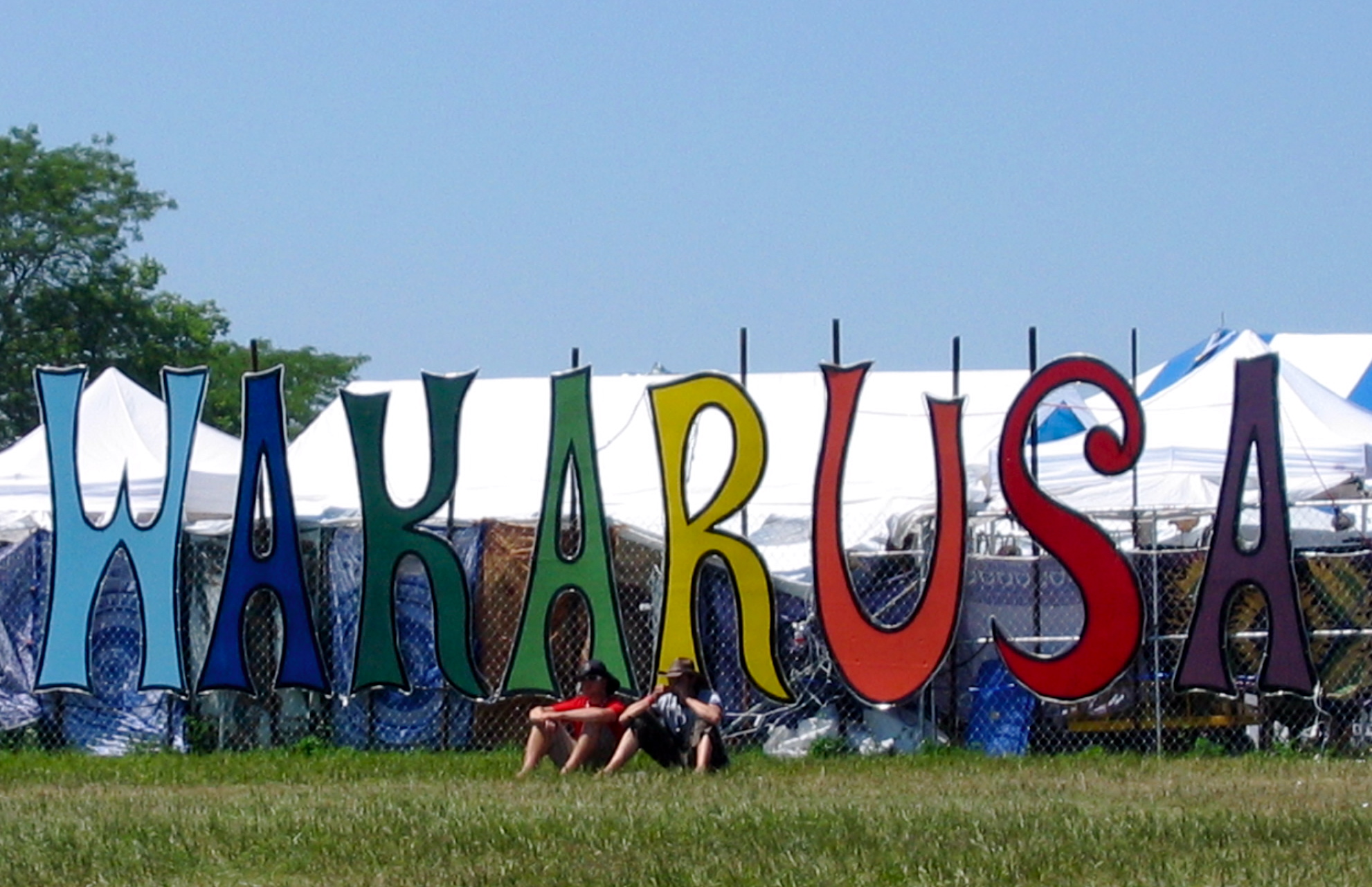
- Genre: Jam bands, Alternative rock, Hip hop, Americana, Country, Bluegrass, Funk, Electronica
- Dates: Early to mid-June
- Locations: Lawrence, Kansas, US (2004–2008) Ozark, Arkansas, US (2009–2015)
- Years active: 2004–2015
- Founders: Brett Mosiman, Timothy L. Smith, John Brooks, Nathan Prenger
- Website: www.wakarusa.com

Wakarusa Music and Camping Festival was a four-day music festival held annually in early June from 2004 to 2015 at Mulberry Mountain near Ozark, Arkansas. Named for the Wakarusa River, the festival was first held at Clinton State Park outside of Lawrence, Kansas. It moved to its new location, just outside Fort Smith and Fayetteville, Arkansas in 2009. The festival was known for an eclectic mix of music and has featured artists like Grammy award winners the Black Keys, The Flaming Lips, Wilco, and Bela Fleck and the Flecktones. Activities other than music included disc golf, yoga, hiking, and swimming in the Mulberry River.

== History ==
The festival grew dramatically from only 5,000 attendees at the initial 2004 Wakarusa to a record 20,000 in 2011.

Along with the Grammy Award-winning artists, other national known touring artists include: STS9, Pretty Lights, Primus, Ben Harper, Neko Case, The Black Keys, Ben Folds, O.A.R., The String Cheese Incident, My Morning Jacket, Gov't Mule, Slightly Stoopid, Umphrey's McGee, The John Butler Trio, The Disco Biscuits, Thievery Corporation, Michael Franti and Spearhead, Yonder Mountain String Band, Leftover Salmon, Bassnectar, Grace Potter and the Nocturnals, Les Claypool, Mumford & Sons, The Avett Brothers, Keller Williams, Cake, Widespread Panic, The Werks and many side projects of members of the Grateful Dead, including the Mickey Hart Band and Bill Kreutzmann's project 7 Walkers. After moving from Clinton Lake State Park in Lawrence, KS to Mulberry Mountain in Ozark, AR, the festival has continued to make a name for itself and grows larger with each coming festival season.

== 2004 ==
The 2004 Wakarusa was held June 17 through June 20 in Clinton State Park near Lawrence, Kansas.

On June 17, the artists that performed were Arthur Dodge, Benevento-Russo Duo, Big Metal Rooster, Ekoostik Hookah, Mindy Smith, Moonshine Still, The Schwag and Particle. The headline act that performed on this day was Sound Tribe Sector 9.

On June 18, the artists that performed were Bockman's Euphio, The Bottle Rockets, Drums & Tuba, Forty Twenty, Galactic, Green Lemon Band, Greyhounds, Hackensaw Boys, Jacob Fred Jazz Odyssey, Jazz Mandolin Project, Keller Williams, Leftover Salmon, Lucero, Marc Broussard, MOFRO, Mother Kali, Papa Mali, Particle, Perpetual Groove, Robbie Fulks, Slobberbone, Sound Tribe Sector 9, Speakeasy, Split Lip Rayfield, Tanner Walle, Theresa Andersson, Tishamingo and Woven. The headline artist that performed on this day was Robert Randolph.

On June 19, the artists that performed were 4 Fried Chickens & A Coke, Big Wu, Bob Schneider, Bockman's Euphio, BR549, Derek Trucks Band, Exit Clov, Galactic, Garaj Mahal, Greyhounds, Guided by Voices, Hackensaw Boys, Hairy Apes BMX, Indigenous, James McMurtry, Jazz Mandolin Project, Kaki King, Leftover Salmon, MOFRO, Monte Montgomery, Motet, Particle, Pomeroy, Robert Bradley's Blackwater Surprise, Robert Walter's 20th Congress, Shanti Groove, Signal Path, Spoon and Tea Leaf Green. The headline act that performed on this day was O.A.R.

On June 20, the artists that performed were Barefoot Manner, Big Wu, Chris Duarte, Dewayn Brothers, Dirty Dozen Brass Band, Donna the Buffalo, Drive-By Truckers, Hello Superworld, Hot Buttered Rum String Band, Indigenous, Jennifer Hartswick Band, Los Lonely Boys, Lost Trailers, Mission 19, Mountain of Venus, Robert Bradley's Blackwater Surprise, The Samples, Split Lip Rayfield, Steve Poltz, Tea Leaf Green and Weary Boys. The headline act that performed on this day were The North Mississippi Allstars.

== 2005 ==
The 2005 Wakarusa was held June 16 through June 19 in Clinton State Park near Lawrence, Kansas.

On June 16, the artists that performed were 56 Hope Road, Animal Liberation Orchestra, Arthur Dodge & the Horsefeathers, Backyard Tire Fire, Big Metal Rooster, Bockman, Carbon Leaf, Chubby Carrier, Deep Fried Pickle Project, Eckobase, Floodplane, Green Lemon Band, Groovelight, Hairy Apes BMX, The Helping Phriendly Band, Jeff and Vida, Jervis Jort, Lotus, Papa Mali, Perpetual Groove, The Schwag, Speakeasy, The Station, Sound Tribe Sector 9, Ten Mile Tide and the Two High String Band. The headline act that performed on this day was Umphrey's McGee.

On June 17, the artists that performed were Animal Liberation Orchestra, Arkamo Ranger Moore, Healey Cindy, Woolf Mark Blilyeu Band, Brother Bagman, Calexico, Carbon Leaf, Conspirator, The Gourds, The Grand Fiasco, Groovatron, Hairy Apes BMX, John Brown's Body, Madahoochi, Matisyahu, Moonshine Still, Mountain of Venus, North Mississippi Allstars, Ozomatli, Papa Mali, Particle, Perpetual Groove, Railroad Earth, Robert Bradley, Shanti Groove, Son Volt, Steel Train, Sound Tribe Sector 9, Tea Leaf Green, Ten Mile Tide, Tiffany Christopher Band and Umphrey's McGee. The headline act that performed on this day was The String Cheese Incident.

On June 18, the artists that performed were 4 Fried Chickens & A Coke, Ari Hest, Big Metal Rooster, Blueground Undergrass, Buttermilk Boys, Charliehorse, Donna the Buffalo, Galactic, The Gourds, Gov't Mule, Green Lemon Band, Greyhounds, Hackensaw Boys, Hot Buttered Rum String Band, Jazz Mandolin Project, John Butler Trio, Junior Brown, Karl Denson's Tiny Universe, Lazy Joe, Matisyahu, Mocean Worker, MOFRO, Moonshine Still, Neko Case, New Monsoon, Particle, Pnuma, Risky Shift Phenomenon, Robert Bradley, Rose Hill Drive, The Samples, Shanti Groove, Split Lip Rayfield, Steel Train, The Stone Band, The String Cheese Incident, Tea Leaf Green and Yossarian's Lament. The headline act that performed on this day was Wilco.

On June 19, the artists that performed were Alabaster Brown, Ari Hest, Big Head Todd & The Monsters, The Big Wu, Blueground Undergrass, Chubby Carrier, Donna the Buffalo, Galactic, Greyhounds, Hello Superworld, Hot Buttered Rum String Band, Jazz Mandolin Project, Kasey Rausch's Winfield Revival, Little Feat, MOFRO, New Monsoon, Old Crow Medicine Show, Proto-Kaw, Pomeroy, The Samples, The Schwag, Shady Deal, Split Lip Rayfield and Xavier Rudd. The headline act that performed on this day was Matisyahu.

== 2006 ==
The 2006 Wakarusa was held June 8 through June 11 in Clinton State Park near Lawrence, Kansas.

On June 8, the artists that performed were 56 Hope Road, Alfred Howard & K23 Orchestra, Arthur Dodge, The Avett Brothers, Bootyjuice, Brass 'n' Grass, The Buffali, Chubby Carrier and the Bayou Swamp Band, Cosmopolitics, Delta Nove, DeWayn Brothers, The Disco Biscuits, E-Bon, Ghosty, Gooding, Grace Potter and the Nocturnals, Green Lemon, Groovatron, Hackensaw Boys, Jackie Greene, Lotus, Madahoochi, Nipplez, Papa Rhino, Perpetual Groove, Pnuma Trio, The Reverend Peyton's Big Damn Band, Ric Roberts, Rob Lee, Samantha Stollenwerk, Todd Snider, Trampled by Turtles, Virginia Coalition, Will Hoge and Woodbox Gang. The headline that performed on this day was Tim Reynolds.

On June 9, the artists that performed were 56 Hope Road, Archetype, Assembly of Dust, Backyard Tire Fire, Bassnectar, Brother's Green, Buckethead, Cross Canadian Ragweed, Del Castillo, Delta Nove, The Disco Biscuits, DJ Smoove, Drakkar Sauna, Full Throttle, Future Rock, Grace Potter and the Nocturnals, Green Lemon, Greyboy Allstars, Groovatron, Hillstomp, Jackie Greene, Jake Shimabukuro, Koncept, Lotus, Lubriphonic, Lucero, Maxx, Mama's Cookin', Michael Franti & Spearhead, MOFRO, Moonshine Still, Motion for Alliance, My-Tea Kind, Never Perfect Intentions, The New Congress, New Monsoon, Order of Chaos, Oteil & The Peacemakers, Outformation, Perpetual Groove, Pnuma Trio & Friends, Probably Vampires, Rose Hill Drive, The Reverend Horton Heat, Samantha Stollenwerck, Shooter Jennings, Sydeburnz vs. Frooky, Tim Reynolds, Trampled by Turtles, Truckstop Honeymoon, Virginia Coalition, The Watchman, and White Ghost Shivers. The headline act that performed on this day was Robert Randolph and the Family Band.

On June 10, the artists that performed were Alabaster Brown, Alan Paul, Animal Liberation Orchestra, Andrew Bird, Assembly of Dust, Backyard Tire Fire, The Balance, Ben Fuller, Benevento-Russo Duo, Bernie Worrell and the Woo Warriors, Big Metal Rooster, Big Thumb, Bob Schneider, Bonobos Convergence, Brothers Past, Buckethead, Camper Van Beethoven, Cat Empire, Chicago Afrobeat Project, Chris Berry & Panjea, Clandestine, Cracker, Deep Fried Pickle Project, Dirty Dozen Brass Band, Don Tinsley, Duece, Euforquestra, Gabby La La, Gov't Mule, Greyboy Allstars, The Ills, Jah Roots, Jerry Joseph, Julia Peterson Band, Keller Williams, Kenny Larkin, Les Claypool, Lila, My Friend Mike, Mutaytor, New Monsoon, Oteil & Peacemakers, Railroad Earth, Roger Clyne and the Peacemakers, Rocky Votolato, Rose Hill Drive, Shanti Groove, Speakeasy, Tea Leaf Green, Tim Hjersted, Tony Markham, Treologic, Trevor Matthews, Yard Dogs Road Show, and Yo Mama's Big Fat Booty Band. The headline act that performed on this day were The Flaming Lips.

On June 11, the artists that performed were Animal Liberation Orchestra, Bad Abby, Billy Spears & Beer Bellies, Brothers Past, Chris Berry and Panjea, Daniella Cotton, Donna The Buffalo, Electric Soul Method, Fire Built 500's, Hot Buttered Rum String Band, Hurra Torpedo, Jerry Joseph & the Jackmormans, Jesus Christ Superstar, Larry Keel & Natural Bridge, MOFRO, Oakhurst, OK Jones, Papa Mali, Polytoxic, Roger Clyne and the Peacemakers, Shanti Groove, Sound Tribe Sector 9, Tea Leaf Green, Truckstop Honeymoon, William Elliott Whitmore, Yard Dogs Road Show, Yo Mamma's Big Fat Booty Band, and Yonder Mountain String Band. The headline act that performed on this day was Bela Fleck & The Flecktones.

== 2007 ==
The 2007 Wakarusa was held June 16 through June 19 in Clinton State Park near Lawrence, Kansas.

On June 7, the artists that performed were BoomBox, Crooked Still, Delta Nove, Dubconscious, Guse, Earl Greyhound, Kan'Nal, Motet, New Mastersounds, Outformation, Perpetual Groove, Pnuma Trio, RAQ, Shannon McNally, The Spam All-Stars, Toubab Krewe and U-Melt. The headline act that performed on this day was the North Mississippi Allstars.

On June 8, the artists that performed were Animal Liberation Orchestra, Backyard Tire Fire, Bobby Bare Jr., Crooked Still, Delta Nove, Earl Greyhound, Galactic, Grant Lee Phillips, JJ Grey and MOFRO, New Mastersounds, North Mississippi Allstars, Ozric Tentacles, Ozomatli, Perpetual Groove, Railroad Earth, RAQ, SeepeopleS, Shannon McNally, Tea Leaf Green, Toubab Krewe, U-Melt, Yo Mama's Big Fat Booty Band, and Yonder Mountain String Band. The headline act that performed on this day was Ben Harper and the Innocent Criminals.

On June 9, the artists that performed were the Animal Liberation Orchestra, Assembly of Dust, Back Yard Tire Fire, Bassnectar, The Bridge, Everyone Orchestra, Grace Potter and the Nocturnals, Honkytonk Homeslice, Indigenous, John Butler Trio, Lotus, New Monsoon, Ozric Tentacles, Railroad Earth, The Slip, Son Volt, Tea Leaf Green, Yo Mama's Big Fat Booty Band, and Yonder Mountain String Band. The headline act that performed on this day was Widespread Panic.

On June 10, the artists that performed were Assembly of Dust, Asylum Street Spankers, The Be Good Tanyas, Buckethead, Citizen Cope, Grace Potter and the Nocturnals, The Greencards, Honkytonk Homeslice, Indigenous, Jesus Christ Superstar, The Lee Boys, Little Feat, Martin Sexton, Medeski Martin and Wood, Michael Franti and Spearhead, New Monsoon, Sam Bush, The Slip, Tangleweed, The Waybacks, and The Wood Brothers. The headline artist that performed on this day was Les Claypool.

== 2008 ==
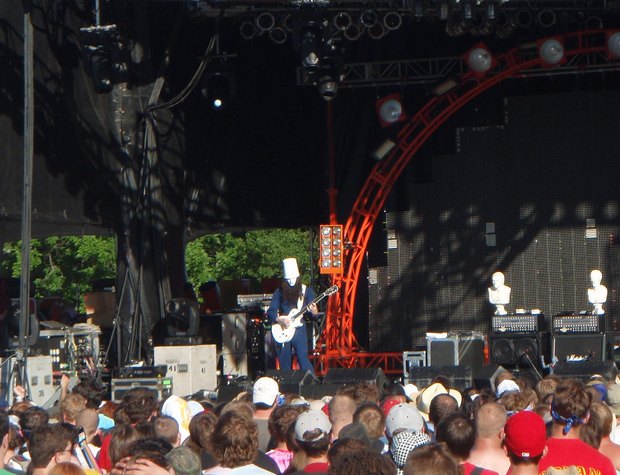
Buckethead live at Wakarusa, 2008

The 2008 Wakarusa was held June 6 through June 8, 2008 in Clinton State Park near Lawrence, Kansas.

On June 6, the artists that performed were Cake, Blackalicious, Ozric Tentacles, Del the Funky Homosapien, Galactic, Buckethead, Everyone Orchestra, Arrested Development, Mates of State, Apollo Sunshine, New Monsoon, Delta Nove, Charles Walker & the Dynamites, Robert Bradley’s Blackwater Surprise, Panjea], Brett Dennen, EOTO, Limbeck, Pete Francis, Trombone Shorty & Orleans Avenue, Back Door Slam, Family Groove Company, Oakhurst, Heavy Pets, Madahoochi and Stardeath and White Dwarfs. The headline act that performed on this day was The Flaming Lips.

On June 7, the artists that performed were Ben Folds, Keller Williams, Leftover Salmon, Ozomatli, Old 97's, Tea Leaf Green, Yard Dogs Road Show, Ozric Tentacles, Alejandro Escovedo, Brett Dennen, State Radio, Dr Dog, Porter Batiste Stoltz, Hot Buttered Rum, C-Mon & Kypski, Ryan Bingham, Pete Francis, Delta Nove, The Gourds, Panjea, Giant Panda Guerilla Dub Squad, Chicago Afrobeat Project, Cornmeal, Blue Turtle Seduction and Galapagos. The headline act that performed on this day was STS9.

On June 8, the artists that performed were Zappa Plays Zappa, Mickey Hart Band w/ Steve Kimock, Keller Williams, David Grisman Quintet, Leftover Salmon, Yard Dogs Road Show, Ivan Neville's Dumpstaphunk, The Avett Brothers, Split Lip Rayfield, State Radio, Tea Leaf Green, Dr Dog, Tilly & the Wall, That One Guy, Bang Camaro, Ryan Bingham, Truckstop Honeymoon, American Babies, Jenny Arnau and Fourth of July. The headline artist was Emmylou Harris (who had to cancel due to illness).

== 2009 ==
The 2009 Wakarusa was held June 4 through June 7 at Mulberry Mountain near Ozark, Arkansas.

Headliners were: The Black Crowes, Gov't Mule, STS9, Yonder Mountain String Band, Les Claypool, G. Love and Special Sauce, Matisyahu, Gomez, Cross Canadian Ragweed, Shpongle - DJ Set, Galactic, Buckethead, Sly and Robbie, Railroad Earth, Steve Kimock Crazy Engine featuring Melvin Seals, PRAANG, Porter Batiste Stoltz, Perpetual Groove, JJ Grey and Mofro, Jimmy Herring Band, The Egg, 20/20 Soundsystem, Lucero, Split Lip Rayfield, The New Mastersounds, Jason Isbell and The 400 Unit, EOTO, Trombone Shorty and Orleans Avenue, Secret Chiefs 3, BoomBox, New Monsoon, GoodPaper of Rev. Robert Mortimer as well as hundreds of other artists. 2009 saw the Wakarusa debut performance of a then unknown Boulder based artist, Pretty Lights, who would later go on to headline the 2012 Wakarusa Festival.

== 2010 ==
The 2010 Wakarusa was held June 3 through the June 6 at Mulberry Mountain near Ozark, Arkansas.

Headliners were: Widespread Panic, STS9, Umphrey's McGee, The Disco Biscuits, The Black Keys, Slightly Stoopid, John Butler Trio, Blues Traveler, Dweezil, Zappa Plays Zappa, Robert Randolph and The Family Band, Bassnectar, Railroad Earth, The Machine Performs Pink Floyd, JJ Grey and Mofro, 7 Walkers feat. Papa Mali and Bill Kreutzmann, Lotus, Rebelution, ALO, State Radio, Tea Leaf Green, BoomBox, Black Joe Lewis, Ivan Neville's Dumpstaphunk, Dub Tribe Soundsystem, Fishbone, EOTO, Todd Snider, Split Lip Rayfield, The Mother Hips, David Tipper, Ott, Hayes Carll, Tortured Soul, Sub Swara, Stephen Kellogg and the Sixers, Reverend Peyton's Big Damn Band, Trampled by Turtles, Wookiefoot, Future Rock, & GoodPaper of Rev. Robert Mortimer.

== 2011 ==
The 2011 Wakarusa was held June 2 through the June 5 at Mulberry Mountain near Ozark, Arkansas.

Artist included headliners: My Morning Jacket, Umphrey's McGee, Ben Harper and the Relentless 7, Thievery Corporation, STS9, Bassnectar Mumford & Sons. Other performing artists included: Michael Franti and Spearhead, Grace Potter and the Nocturnals, Toots and the Maytals, Shpongle presents the Shpongletron Experience, Hallucinogen, Ghostland Observatory, Buckethead, Galactic, Lotus, Dark Star Orchestra, Skrillex, Trombone Shorty & New Orleans Avenue, Wookiefoot, EOTO, Paper Diamond, Moon Taxi, Mountain Sprout, Beats Antique, The Ben Miller Band, Marrakesh Express ~ a Crosby, Stills, Nash, & Young experience, and many more.

== 2012 ==
The 2012 Wakarusa was held May 31 through the June 3 of June at Mulberry Mountain near Ozark, Arkansas.

Artist included headliners: Pretty Lights, Avett Brothers, Primus, Umphrey's McGee, Weir Greene Robinson Trio, Slightly Stoopid, and Edward Sharpe and the Magnetic Zeros. Other performing artists included: Fitz and the Tantrums, Girl Talk, Matisyahu, The Bright Light Social Hour, Royal Family Ball featuring Soulive & Lettuce, G.Love & Special Sauce, Ghostland Observatory, Balkan Beat Box, The Del McCoury Band, Railroad Earth, Savoy, Nobody Beats the Drum, EOTO, Quixotic, MiMOSA, ALO, Tea Leaf Green, Keller Williams, Emmit Nershi Band, The Devil Makes Three, That 1 Guy, The Lumineers, Cordovas, Beats Antique, Big Gigantic and more.

== 2013 ==
The 2013 Wakarusa was held May 30 through June 2 at Mulberry Mountain near Ozark, Arkansas.

Artists included headliners: Widespread Panic, Dispatch, STS9. The Black Crowes, Amon Tobin, Snoop Lion. Other performing artists included: Umphrey's McGee, Yonder Mountain String Band, Gogol Bordello, Zeds Dead, Of Monsters and Men, GROUPLOVE, SOJA, The Bright Light Social Hour, Rebelution, Quixotic, Galactic, Shpongle presents The Masquerade, Tipper, MUTEMATH, Son Volt, Ozomatli, EOTO, SAVOY, RJD2, Totally Enormous Extinct Dinosaurs, Gramatik, Los Amigos Invisibles, Calexico, Karl Denson's Tiny Universe, Del the Funky Homosapien, Bombino, Allen Stone, Figure, Emancipator, GRiZ, Icona Pop, Felix Cartal, Baauer, The Polish Ambassador, Minnesota, The Green, BoomBox, Papadosio, Wallpaper., Red Baraat, Milo Greene, The Floozies, Anuheal, Zion I, ZOOGMA and more.

== 2014 ==
Gravity Feed, Bassnectar, Reignwolf

== Cancellation and replacement ==
On December 17, 2015, festival organizer Pipeline Productions announced via Facebook post that the event would not take place in 2016 due to financial and legal disputes with partners. Pipeline Productions had recently cancelled two other events at Mulberry Mountain, Thunder on the Mountain and Phases of the Moon, due to similar disputes. A rival festival, Highberry, quickly moved into the venue.

== See also ==
- List of jam band music festivals
- List of bluegrass music festivals
