= 2008 Langerado Music Festival =

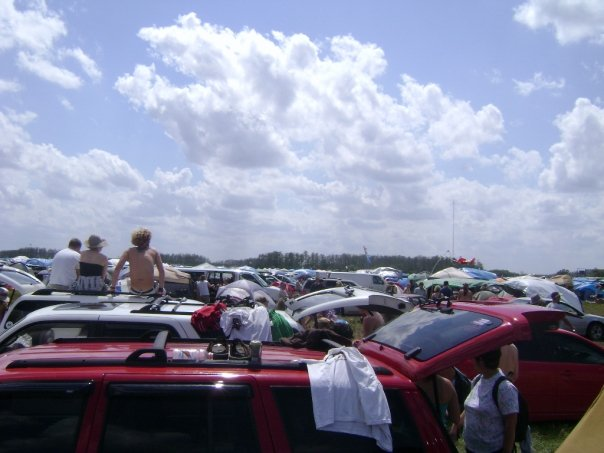
Campground at Langerado 2008

The sixth Langerado Festival was held March 6, 2008 through March 9, 2008, making it one day longer than the previous year. The festival took place on the Big Cypress Indian Reservation, thirty miles west of Ft. Lauderdale and featured on-site camping.

== Lineup ==
On March 6, the artists that performed were Sonicbids Winner, Dead Confederate, Ben Jelen, Les Claypool, That 1 Guy, Golem, Busdriver, Awesome New Republic, The New Deal, Dark Star Orchestra and Perpetual Groove.

On March 7, the artists that performed were The Dynamites, American Bang, School of Rock All Stars, Brett Dennen, Earl Greyhound, Matt Pond PA, Indigenous, Backyard Tire Fire, The Walkmen, Ozomatli, Sam Bush, The Wailers, The Heavy Pets, Vampire Weekend (cancelled in order to appear on Saturday Night Live), G. Love & Special Sauce, Sierra Leone's Refugee All Stars, 311, Spam Allstars, !!!, The Roots, Mickey Hart Band, Built to Spill, Beastie Boys, Bassnectar, Umphrey's McGee, Phix and Sound Tribe Sector 9.

On March 8, the artists that performed were The Postmarks, Blitzen Trapper, Trevor Hall, Railroad Earth, The Bad Plus, American Babies, State Radio, The Wood Brothers, New Mastersounds, Arrested Development, Avett Brothers (slated to play but were not there), Citizen Cope, Pnuma Trio, Dr. Dog, Ben Folds, Antibalas, Thievery Corporation, RAQ, Benevento/Russo Duo, Matisyahu, Medeski, Scofield, Martin & Wood, Ghostland Observatory, R.E.M., Pelican, The Disco Biscuits, The Lee Boys, Dan Deacon and Yard Dogs Road Show.

On March 9, the artists that performed were Chris Hartford & The Band of Changes, Will Hoges, Balkan Beat Box (slated to play but were not there), Hoots & Hellmouth, Jonah Smith, Martin Sexton, Josh Ritter, Shout Out Louds, The Meters, Pete Francis, Keller Williams, Felice Brothers, Grace Potter & The Nocturnals, Gov't Mule, Steel Train, Minus The Bear, Ani DiFranco, Blind Melon, of Montreal, Phil Lesh & Friends and The National.
