= 2009 Langerado Music Festival =

The seventh Langerado Festival was scheduled to be held on March 6–8, 2009. The festival was planned to move to Bicentennial Park in Miami, Florida.

This caused controversy among fans who disliked the direction the festival was heading, considering it "selling out" and saying it would lose the unique character of the festival. Another concern was the unavailability of parking and places to stay in Miami, as many people who attended the previous festivals simply camped out at the park or nearby camping sites. On February 3, it was announced that Langerado 2009 would be canceled due to sluggish ticket sales resulting from disenchantment over the new location, atypical lineup, and lack of onsite camping.

== Lineup ==
The initial lineup was posted on December 9, 2008.

Death Cab for Cutie • Snoop Dogg • Thievery Corporation • Slightly Stoopid • Ryan Adams and the Cardinals • Dashboard Confessional • The Pogues • Matisyahu • Flogging Molly • Michael Franti & Spearhead • Broken Social Scene • Café Tacuba • Umphrey's McGee • The Disco Biscuits • Robert Randolph & The Family Band • Pepper • The Faint • Cold War Kids • Steel Pulse • Public Enemy • Gym Class Heroes • Tricky • Girl Talk • Chromeo • Mutemath • Bad Brains • Ozomatli • Against Me! • George Clinton & Parliament / Funkadelic • Tortoise • DeVotchKa • Black Kids • Grupo Fantasma • Holy Fuck • Budos Band • Tokyo Police Club • Lotus • The Virgins • The Gaslight Anthem • King Khan and the Shrines • Lucero • Murs • Ra Ra Riot • Tortured Soul • Rebelution • K'Naan • The Egg • Zac Brown Band • Tigercity • The Aggrolites • Cloud Cult • Spam Allstars • Rachel Goodrich • Blue King Brown • The Heavy Pets • Awesome New Republic • The Postmarks • Suenalo Sound System • Live Painting by LEBO • Modest Mouse • Gene Ween Band • Deerhunter • Alberta Cross
