= 2003 Langerado Music Festival =

Festival in Ft. Lauderdale, Florida

The first Langerado was held as a single day festival and took place at Stadium Festival Fair Grounds, Ft. Lauderdale, FL. The show was held on March 8, 2003 and included three stages and fifteen bands. Approximately 3,500 fans were in attendance for the show.

== Lineup ==
The artists that attended the festival included moe., Medeski Martin & Wood, G. Love & Special Sauce, MOFRO, Charlie Hunter Trio, the Codetalkers feat. Col. Bruce Hampton, Reverend Jeff Mosier's Ear Reverents, raq, Moonshine Still, Perpetual Groove, Hashbrown, Almost Acoustic Band, Swayback, Kynda and DJ Le Spam.
