= Should Have Seen It Coming =

Studio album by Split Lip Rayfield
- Released: September 28, 2004
- Genre: Bluegrass
- Label: Bloodshot

Split Lip Rayfield chronology
Live (2004)	Should Have Seen It Coming (2004)	I'll Be Around (2008)

Professional ratings
Review scores
Source	Rating
AllMusic	4/5 stars

Should Have Seen It Coming is the fourth studio album by the American bluegrass band Split Lip Rayfield, released in 2004.

== Track listing ==
All songs written by Kirk Rundstrom except where noted.

1. "Hundred Dollar Bill" (Gottstine) – 2:21
2. "Truth & Lies" – 1:47
3. "Honestly" – 1:49
4. "Redneck Tailgate Dream" (Mardis) – 3:21
5. "Promise Not to Tell" (Gottstine) – 3:08
6. "A Little More Cocaine Please" (Gottstine) – 2:17
7. "C'mon Get Your Gun" – 1:49
8. "Used To Be" – 2:34
9. "Lonely Man Blues" – 1:46
10. "Don't Believe That You're Someone" (Gottstine) – 2:32
11. "Down South Sally" (Gottstine) – 2:29
12. "Should Have Seen it Coming" (Gottstine) – 3:02
13. "Out of Time" (Gottstine) – 3:49
14. "Union Man" – 1:53
15. "Lonesome Heart" – 1:55
16. "Just Like A Gillian Welch Song" (Gottstine) – 2:50

== Personnel ==
- Jeff Eaton – gas tank bass, vocals
- Wayne Gottstine – mandolin, vocals
- Kirk Rundstrom – guitar, vocals
- Eric Mardis – banjo, vocals
