= Live at the Cotillion Ballroom =

Live at the Cotillion Ballroom is the first live DVD from the bluegrass/punk band Split Lip Rayfield. It was recorded live on December 8 of 2006 at The Cotillion Ballroom in Wichita, Kansas. It was billed as the "last show" after the deteriorating health of band member Kirk Rundstrom made it difficult to tour. The DVD contains songs from all five studio albums, including "Rig or Cross", which was unreleased at the time, but later appeared on I'll Be Around. It also contained the songs "How Many Biscuits Can You Eat?", "Orange Blossom Special", and "Old Time Religion", not on any studio album.

== Track listing ==
1. "Flat Black Rag"
2. "Devil"
3. "Old #6"
4. "Record Shop"
5. "Movin' to Virginia"
6. "Easy Street"
7. "Old Time Religion"
8. "Used to Call Me Baby"
9. "Love Please Come Home"
10. "Rig or Cross"
11. "Truckin' Song"
12. "Barnburner"
13. "3.2 Flu"
14. "Cutie Pie"
15. "Honestly"
16. "Redneck Tailgate Dream"
17. "Pinball Machine"
18. "BB24SS"
19. "Don't Believe That You're Someone"
20. "Hounds"
21. "Never Make It Home"
22. "Outlaw"
23. "How Many Biscuits Can You Eat?"
24. "River"
25. "Kiss of Death"
26. "Orange Blossom Special"
27. "Freckle Faced Liza Jane"
28. "Hundred Dollar Bill"
29. "San Antone"
30. "Goodbye"
31. "Credits"

== Personnel ==
- Jeff Eaton - Gas Tank Bass, Vocals
- Wayne Gottstine - Mandolin, Vocals
- Kirk Rundstrom - Guitar, Vocals
- Eric Mardis - Banjo, Vocals
