= Riverstone =

Riverstone may refer to:

== Places ==
- Riverstone, New South Wales, a suburb of Sydney, Australia
  - Riverstone railway station, Sydney
  - Electoral district of Riverstone
  - Riverstone High School
- Riverstone Terraces, a suburb of Upper Hutt, New Zealand
- Riverstone (Fort Bend County, Texas), a master-planned residential community in Sugar Land, Texas and Missouri City, Texas

== Companies and organizations ==
- Riverstone Holdings, an energy and power focused private equity firm
- Riverstone International School, a school in Boise, Idaho
- Riverstone Networks, a computer networking company

== Other ==
- Patuxent River stone, a gem
- Riverstone (film), a 2026 Sri Lankan film
- Riverstone, an album by Ten Mile Tide
