= 2004 Langerado Music Festival =

The second Langerado Music Festival was held on March 6, 2004, in the heart of downtown Hollywood, FL at the Young Circle Park. In excess of 4,000 people attended this show, which followed in the tradition of the previous year and was a single day event.

== Lineup ==
The artists that attended the festival included Cake, moe., The Wailers, G. Love & Special Sauce, Sound Tribe Sector 9, Cracker, Drive By Truckers, MOFRO, Moshi Moshi, Perpetual Groove, ulu, Brothers Past, Rana, the Spam Allstars, Seth Yacovone Band, Whirlaway, louque, the Yoko Theory and Way of the Groove.
