= Tinker Toys (album) =

Studio album by Rachel Goodrich
- Released: October 29, 2008
- Label: Yellow Bear Records

Tinker Toys is the first full-length album of the US-American musician Rachel Goodrich. The self-produced album was released on October 29, 2008 on Goodrich's label Yellow Bear Records.

== Background ==
Goodrich stated that the recording of the album was not planned:

I didn't mean to record a record. A friend of mine, George Martinez, was like, 'Hey, come over to my place and we'll record a song.' His entire studio is in this bedroom, and I'm pretty much recording in his closet, you know, and the first song we recorded was 'Ukulele Water.' It kind of blew my mind. I was like, wow, this can really happen? It was exciting, so I was like, 'Let's do another one tomorrow.' Then we recorded 'Black Hole,' and we kept going. I walked in with no expectations, and it was all a surprise.

== Reception ==
The song "Light Bulb" was featured in the episode "A Modest Proposal" of the TV series Weeds (Season 5 Episode 6), and the song also features in a Crayola commercial advertisement. A remix of the song was made by Awesome New Republic and used on the BT Infinity – "Light Streams" advert.

The songs "Light Bulb", "Piggy Bank" & "Ukulele Water" were featured in the MTV show My Life As Liz.

== Track listing ==
Tinker Toys
No.	Title	Length
1.	"Piggy Bank"	2:53
2.	"The Black Hole"	3:19
3.	"Excuses, Excuses"	2:22
4.	"Terminal Song"	2:47
5.	"ABC"	3:00
6.	"Dope Song"	3:05
7.	"Ukulele Water"	1:40
8.	"Little Brass Bear"	4:25
9.	"Light Bulb"	2:39
