= I'll Be Around =

I'll Be Around may refer to:

- I'll Be Around (album), by Split Lip Rayfield, 2008
- "I'll Be Around" (1942 song), a popular/jazz song written by Alec Wilder
- "I'll Be Around" (Rappin' 4-Tay song), 1995
- "I'll Be Around" (The Spinners song), 1972
- "I'll Be Around", a song by Cee Lo Green from Cee-Lo Green... Is the Soul Machine, 2004
- "I'll Be Around", a song by Empire of the Sun from Ice on the Dune, 2013
- "I'll Be Around", a song by Michael W. Smith from I'll Lead You Home, 1995
- "I'll Be Around", a song by Yo La Tengo from Fade, 2013
- "I'll Be Around", a song from My Little Pony: The Movie, 2017
