= 2006 Langerado Music Festival =

The fourth Langerado music festival was once again held at Markham Park in Sunrise, Fl on March 11 and March 12, 2006. The fourth installment of this festival series expanded further, with several pre and post festival shows. On March 10, the festival kicked off with a separately ticketed event at the Markham Park grounds called the "Langerado Sound Check" and featured a handful of artists not performing on the actual two-day festival. Each evening on all three days of the Langerado weekend, multiple late-night shows took place at venues such as the Culture Room and the Revolution. The festival drew a reported 12,000 attendees each day.

== Lineup ==
The lineup for the 2006 Langerado Music Festival included Ben Harper and the Innocent Criminals, The Black Crowes, The Flaming Lips, Wilco, the Meters, G. Love & Special Sauce, Robert Randolph & the Family Band, Keller Williams, Burning Spear, Slightly Stoopid, the Disco Biscuits, Umphrey's McGee, Michael Franti & Spearhead, the Secret Machines, Antibalas Afrobeat Orchestra, Drive-By Truckers, Mofro, Brazilian Girls, Clap Your Hands Say Yeah, Kinky, Lake Trout, Lotus, Kid Koala, Lyrics Born, Los Amigos Invisibles, RJD2, Steel Train, Brothers Past, Rose Hill Drive, The Spam Allstars, the New Mastersounds, Perpetual Groove, and the Pnuma Trio.
