= Rachel Goodrich =

- Born: Rachel Beth Goodrich
- Origin: Miami, Florida, US
- Instruments: vocals, guitar, ukulele, kazoo, charango
- Years active: 2007–present
- Website: www.rachelgoodrich.com

Rachel Beth Goodrich is an American musician from Miami, Florida. Her music has been described as an "eclectic blend of vaudeville-inspired indie pop, swing-jazz and country-folk."

Her first album, Tinker Toys, was self-released in 2008 to which the New York Times dubbed her as a "queen of the Miami indie rock scene".

The second, self-titled album was produced by Grammy-winning music producer Greg Wells.

Goodrich's song, "Light Bulb", was featured in an episode of the TV series Weeds, and the song also features in a Crayola commercial advertisement. A remix of the song was made by Awesome New Republic and used on the BT Infinity – "Light Streams" advert.

The songs, "Light Bulb", "Piggy Bank" & "Ukulele Water" were featured in the MTV show My Life As Liz.

== Discography ==
=== Albums ===
- Tinker Toys (2008)
- Rachel Goodrich (2011)
- Apple Juice + Whiskey (2012) (under Rachel Hoodrich)
- Baby, Now We're Even (2014)

=== EPs ===
- Homemade
