= Oakhurst (band) =

American bluegrass-rock band

Oakhurst is an American bluegrass-rock band from Denver, Colorado, founded in 1999 by bassist Johnny James Qualley and singer Adam Patrick Hill. Since 2004, they have toured nationally full-time and released five records. Their most recent album, Barrel (2012), was produced in Nashville, Tennessee, by Joe Pisapia. The band blends traditional bluegrass with rock & roll, driven by a bold, rhythmic energy.

== Awards ==
- On June 28, 2007, Oakhurst was voted Best Bluegrass Band in Colorado by Denver Westword magazine.

== Personnel ==
=== Current members ===
- A.P. Hill - Acoustic Guitar & Vocals
- Johnny James Qualley - Doghouse & Electric Bass
- Michael Colón - Drums & Percussion
- Matthew Cooper - Banjo & Vocals
- Chuck Hugenberg - Fiddle, Mandolin, & Vocals

=== Past members ===
- Todd Hoefen ('99 - '04) *Andrew Clapp ('04 - '05) * Chris Budin ('05 - '12) - Drums
- Ray Foss ('02 - '04) - Piano
- Adam Smith - ('03 - '09) - Mandolin & Electric Guitar
- Max Paley - ('09 - '15) - Mandolin, Electric Guitar & Vocals
- Zach Daniels - ('04 - '11) Banjo, Electric Guitar, & Vocals
- Daniel Lawrence Walker ('11 - '13) - Slide Guitar & Vocals
- Ed Caner (at Wakarusa Festivals, a cruise or two, and South Dakota Venues) - Fiddle & Viola

== Discography ==
- Loose & Prosperous (2001)
  - River & Sticks
  - Punch Me
  - Speak
  - Loose & Prosperous
  - Hands Tucked
  - Djibouti
  - Trenchina
- Greenhorn (2004)
  - Leslie's
  - Give
  - Sweet Carolina
  - Linger
  - Change
  - Four-Twenty
  - Circles
- Dual Mono (2005)
  - Gypsies at JR's
  - Moonshine Still
  - Arkansas River
  - Brigade
  - Eggs On my Face
  - Grass is Greener
  - Dance Around
  - River and Sticks
  - Chili
  - Hit The Road
  - Kooky-Eyed Fox
  - Olivine
  - Can't Wait
  - Say Hello
- Jump in the Get Down (2008)
  - Down the Lane
  - Huckleberry Strangler
  - Get Down
  - Passing Through
  - Love Law & Pain
  - Bitterroot Hop
  - Close Your Eyes
  - Soon As The Sun
  - Crazy
  - Run Run Run
  - Heart String
- Barrel (2012)
  - Please
  - Out West
  - I'll Be Alright
  - Barrel
  - Promises
  - Hallelu
  - Hartford
  - Sunshine
  - Surrender
  - Toast
  - Time To Change
  - Everlovin' Born
  - Bonus track: Satellites
