= Jonah Smith =

American singer-songwriter

Jonah Smith is an American musician, singer-songwriter based in Los Angeles. He began his career as a solo artist in 2000 in Brooklyn, New York. He has recorded several records and was a semi-finalist on Season 9 of America's Got Talent. He was born in Syracuse, New York.

== Education ==
Smith attended University of Miami (Florida) for one semester. While in Miami, Smith became friends with Stephen Glover, who would later be known as Steve-O. Smith transferred to the University of Vermont, where he received his Bachelor of Arts degree. While in Vermont, Smith played with several bands and performed in clubs in Vermont. His main group was Funk's G that played regularly in Burlington opening for national acts like Government Mule, Andy Summers and Groove Collective. Smith co-lead this band and wrote several songs in its repertoire. The group never recorded. During this time, Smith also played as a sideman in a group called Orange Factory with John Hill on bass.

== Early career (Boston 1998–2000) ==
In 1998, Smith moved to Boston where he started a new band. He made a demo tape with musicians Adam Deitch, Eric Krasno, and Goapele that was engineered by Jeff Bhasker. This tape helped secure a solid line up of musicians that would perform all over Boston and surrounding areas as Deluxe.

== Career (Brooklyn 2000–2013) ==
In 2000, Smith moved to Brooklyn, NY and started performing under his own name. With Ben Rubin and Bob Reynolds as holdovers from Deluxe, Smith added drummer, Marko Djordjevic and guitarist, David Soler to form a new group. They recorded Smith's debut album, Industry Rule, at the end of 2000. The album was completed in under a week. The sound of the album has been described as "blue-eyed soul and Nashville-inspired Americana."

In 2003, Smith recorded Beneath the Underdog, with Bill Frisell as a guest guitarist. It was recorded by Relix Records.

In 2006, Relix Records released Jonah Smith, the self-titled "debut". In early 2007, My Morning Scene won Best Folk/Singer-Songwriter Song at the 6th Annual Independent Music Awards. This record, being the first promoted on a national scale, gained Smith a wider audience and landed him a spot at 2007s Bonnaroo Festival in Manchester, Tennessee and the Langerado Festival in South Florida in March 2008.

In 2009 Smith released two records. Lights On was produced by Malcolm Burn. Smith was an early adopter of the fan-funding method, which he used to finance the making of Lights On after Relix Records ceased operations.

In 2012 Smith released Little Known Cure again using fan funding. Another band Smith started called The Statesmen released their debut record. The group featured Smith on co-lead vocals and keys, Josh Dion on co-lead vocals and drums, Scott Metzger on guitar and Ben Rubin on bass. The record was distributed in Japan through Buffalo Records. The album was nominated for Best Rock Record at the 12th Annual Independent Music Awards.

== Los Angeles (2013–present) ==
Not long before relocating from Brooklyn to Los Angeles at the end of 2012, Smith made an acoustic recording with Andy Stack in his kitchen in Long Island City. Smith would finish and release the record, aptly named “In The Kitchen” in mid 2013.

== America’s Got Talent (Season 9) ==
Smith auditioned for the show in Los Angeles and was asked to fly to New York to tape a live performance in front of the judges in April 2014. He sang his original song Skyscraper Blues and received a standing ovation from judges Howard Stern and Howie Mandel. He advanced to the next round and performed his unique version of Can’t Find My Way Home by Blind Faith, which further impressed the judges. Also, during this week Smith replaced his drummer, which became part of the storyline of the episode. Smith performed Stay With Me in the quarter-final round and again received praise from the judges. Heidi Klum serenaded Smith during her comments. In the semi-final round, Smith performed One Republic's Till The Love Runs Out. The song impressed judge Mel B and host Nick Cannon but Howard Stern thought it was a poor song choice. It ended up being Smith's final performance on the show.

Not long after that, Smith signed a deal with Music Road Records. In May 2016, they released his record, Easy Prey. The record has guest appearances by Ruthie Foster, David Hidalgo, Lucius, Adam Levy and Bob Reynolds. Heavy Hangs The Crown from that record was nominated for Best Blues Song at the 15th Independent Music Awards.

In June 2017, Smith released Stay Close – the third acoustic record made with Andy Stack. He returned to the fan-funding model for this record after taking a step back from Music Road. The record was recorded to an old Ampex tape machine in Stack's studio in Beacon, New York. The record also features singer Melissa Ahern on several songs. The song "Ocala" was featured on The Washington Post's online edition home page on Christmas Day 2016 – months before its release in a story called, Grace, Unwrapped. Compare Your Blues made the playlist at SiriusXM's Coffeehouse channel.

== Discography ==
=== Albums ===
- Industry Rule (2001)
- Beneath the Underdog (2003)
- Jonah Smith (2006)
- Brooklyn Session (2008)
- Lights On (2009)
- The Statesmen (2012)
- Little Known Cure (2012)
- In the Kitchen (2013)
- Easy Prey (2016)
- Stay Close (2017)

=== Singles ===
- "Skyscraper Blues" (2014)
