= In the Mud =

In The Mud

Studio album by Split Lip Rayfield
- Released: September 7, 1999
- Genre: Bluegrass
- Label: Bloodshot Records

Split Lip Rayfield chronology
| Split Lip Rayfield (1998) | In The Mud (1999) | Never Make It Home (2001) |

Professional ratings
Review scores
| Source | Rating |
|---|---|
| AllMusic | 3.5/5 stars |
| The Austin Chronicle | 3.5/4 stars |

In The Mud is the second studio album by the American bluegrass band Split Lip Rayfield, released in 1999 (see 1999 in music).

It was the first album to include mandolin player Wayne Gottstine.

== Critical reception ==
The Austin Chronicle wrote: "High-lonesome vocal harmonies and traditional instrumentation (except the trademark bass made from an auto gas tank) nominally bring this band under the 'bluegrass' category, but the ferocity of the playing and desperation of the lyrics would have Bill Monroe spinning in his grave like a chicken on a spit."

== Track listing ==
All songs written by Kirk Rundstrom except where noted.

1. "13" – 2:09
2. "Wrong" – 2:26
3. "All I Got" (Gottstine) – 2:23
4. "In The Ground" (Mardis) – 2:39
5. "Family" – 2:24
6. "Devil" – 3:05
7. "Easy Street" (M. Montgomert, E. Montgomery; BMI) – 2:06
8. "Trouble" – 3:46
9. "3.2 Flu" (Gottstine) – 2:11
10. "Glory of the Sun" – 2:00
11. "Drinkin' Around" (Gottstine) – 1:21
12. "Hounds" (Mardis) – 3:12
13. "Strong" – 1:57
14. "Tennessee" – 2:17
15. "John" – 2:01
16. "Truckin' Song" (Gottstine) – 1:59

== Personnel ==
- Kirk Rundstrom - Guitar, Vocals, (Mandolin on "Glory")
- Jeff Eaton - Gas Tank Bass, Vocals
- Eric Mardis - Banjo, Dobro, Vocals
- Wayne Gottstine - Mandolin, Vocals, (Guitar on "Wrong," "Glory," and "Drinkin")
