= The Moon Is Disgusting =

Studio album by That 1 Guy
- Released: May 8, 2007
- Genre: Experimental
- Length: 51:12
- Producer: Karl Derfler

That 1 Guy chronology
Songs in the Key of Beotch (2000)	The Moon Is Disgusting (2007)	Mustaches Remix EP (2009)

Professional ratings
Review scores
Source	Rating
AllMusic	3/5 stars
Las Vegas Weekly	4/5 stars

The Moon Is Disgusting is the second album by That 1 Guy, released in 2007.

== Critical reception ==
AllMusic praised the title track and the "wobbly funk" of "Bananas". The Mercury News wrote that the album's sound "suggests Nine Inch Nails backing They Might Be Giants at Les Claypool’s house." Las Vegas Weekly wrote that "this zouk-inspired sophomore CD pulses more thickly and confidently than his debut Songs in the Key of Beotch without losing any of the nonchalant innovation."

== Track listing ==
1. "The Moon Is Disgusting" – 5:44
2. "Bananas" – 4:31
3. "Mash" – 3:21
4. "Oranges" – 1:58
5. "Jigsaw" – 2:57
6. "Mustaches" – 3:13
7. "Dig" – 3:51
8. "Buttmachine" – 3:06
9. "How's 'Bout Them Holes in the Moon (Butter Side Down)" – 5:01
10. "Guava" – 3:07
11. "Rainbow" – 14:23
