= Eddy Joe Cotton =

American poet

- Occupations: Hobo poet; essayist; ringleader
- Writing career
- Genres: Memoir, essays
- Website: www.eddyjoecotton.com

Eddy Joe Cotton (real name Zebu Recchia) is the author of Hobo: A Young Man’s Thoughts on Trains and Tramping in America, which made it to the Denver Post best-seller list. Cotton wrote the book about the first three weeks of tramping at age 19 after leaving his father's home in Denver, Colorado. Cotton is also the ringleader and hobo poet of the Yard Dogs Road Show.

== Quotes ==
"If you don't have a blanket you can stuff newspaper in your clothes and it'll act as insulation."

"So there goes all that truth changing again and there we go looking into the neon horizon with sunset eyes—hoping for the best and sharing all the rest."
