= Mostly Ape =

Studio album by Drums & Tuba
- Released: September 8, 2002
- Genre: Experimental rock, instrumental rock
- Length: 50:18
- Label: Righteous Babe Records

Professional ratings
Review scores
Source	Rating
AllMusic	3/5 stars
Robert Christgau	(choice cut)
The Daily Campus	(7/10)
Cavalier Daily	(mixed)
Daily Nebraskan	(B)
LAS Magazine	(unrated)

Mostly Ape is an album by experimental rock trio Drums & Tuba, released on September 8, 2002 on Righteous Babe Records. It is their second album released on the label.

The album's title derives from a phrase the band often uses to describe humans' animalistic tendencies.

== Recording ==
Brian Wolff, the band's tuba and trumpet player, said their goal in making the album was to "get people to say ‘I’ve never seen anything like that before in my life, and it fucking rocked.’" The album was recorded largely live in the studio, with minimal overdubs, over a period of one week.

== Track listing ==
1. Brain Liaters
2. Igor Rosso
3. Sevens
4. The Metrics
5. 4style
6. Elephants
7. Clashing
8. Air Con Dee
9. Superbee
10. Breakfast with Miletus
11. Goose Geese
12. Magoo

== Personnel ==
- Neal McKeeby – guitar
- Tony Nozero – drums, electronics
- Brian Wolff – tuba, trumpet
