= Split Lip Rayfield (album) =

Studio album by Split Lip Rayfield
- Released: July 7, 1998
- Genre: Bluegrass
- Label: Bloodshot

Split Lip Rayfield chronology
| Split Lip Rayfield (1998) | In the Mud (1999) |

Professional ratings
Review scores
| Source | Rating |
|---|---|
| AllMusic | 3/5 stars |

Split Lip Rayfield is the first studio album by the American bluegrass band Split Lip Rayfield, released in 1998.

== Track listing ==
All songs written by Kirk Rundstrom except where noted.

1. "Coffee" – 2:07
2. "Outlaw" – 2:57
3. "Long Haul Weekend" (E H Ebner/B Spears/ J Rhodes) – 1:16
4. "Combine" (Rundstrom/Eaton/Mardis) – 3:02
5. "Barnburner" (Rundstrom/Eaton) – 2:26
6. "Blue Tick Hound" (Dermer/Rundstrom) – 1:22
7. "Sunshine" (Rundstrom/Eaton/Mardis) – 2:20
8. "Pinball Machine" (L L Irving) – 3:09
9. "Judas" – 1:58
10. "Cutie Pie" (Rundstrom/Eaton) – 2:43
11. "Flat Black Rag" (Rundstrom/Eaton) – 1:57
12. "Freckle Faced Liza Jane" (Trad.) – 2:11
13. "No Idea" – 2:11
14. "San Antone" – 2:43
15. "Tiger in My Tank" (J T Nesbitt Jr.) – 1:58

== Personnel ==
- Kirk Rundstrom – guitar, vocals
- Jeff Eaton – gas tank bass, vocals, kazoo
- Eric Mardis – banjo, vocals

=== Additional personnel ===
- Mandolin on "Coffee" and "Blue Tick Hound" by Craig "Big Country" Dermer
- Bass drum on "Pinball" by Colin Mahoney
