= ANR So Far =

Studio album by Awesome New Republic
- Released: October 5, 2005
- Genre: Punk, Soul, R&B
- Label: Sutro
- Producer: Michael John Hancock, Brian Robertson

Awesome New Republic chronology
ANR So Far (2005)	All Party Talks (2005)

Professional ratings
Review scores
Source	Rating
Pitchfork Media	(7.9/10)

ANR So Far is the debut album by Miami, Florida indie band Awesome New Republic. The album was created from a combination of two albums ANR handmade while at the University of Miami, Witness Now the Birth of an Awesome New Republic and Courageous. ANR's debut was well received by critics including a 7.9/10 rating from Pitchfork Media who described the album as "loaded with great moments" and "fully formed and totally enjoyable."

== Track listing ==
1. "Introducing"
2. "Wheels, No Engines"
3. "2k3012"
4. "Sneaky"
5. "Going Down"
6. "Kill South Beach Dead"
7. "Dogs Barking"
8. "Constant Surgery"
9. "Post What?"
10. "Dirge"
11. "The Clap"
12. "Son! Tyrant!"
13. "Fearsome Father"
14. "The Tape They Don't Want You To See"
15. "10K (Reprise)"/ "Kit On Fire"

== Personnel ==
Awesome New Republic

- Michael John Hancock – vocals, drums
- Brian Robertson – keys, vocals
