= Bolt on Neck =

Studio album by Frankenstein Brothers
- Released: September 17, 2008
- Length: 45:13
- Label: TDRS Music
- Producer: Travis Dickerson

Bolt on Neck is a collaboration album between guitarist Buckethead and That 1 Guy, collectively calling themselves Frankenstein Brothers. The album was originally only available on tour as of September 17, 2008 and sold at Buckethead shows, and was released online at TDRS Music as of December 1.

The album cover was listed in The Wolf's Top 10 of 2008; "The artist does a good job of blending simplicity and subtlety, ending with a creation that could be stared at throughout the entire length of the album."

== Track listing ==
No.	Title	Length
1.	"Bolt on Neck"	6:03
2.	"5 Second Minute"	8:26
3.	"Bought Big Ben"	5:07
4.	"The Thief & the Prince"	13:38
5.	"Wait"	1:33
6.	"Prototype #1"	10:26

== Credits ==
- Music by Buckethead and That 1 Guy
- Recorded, mixed, mastered and artwork design by Travis Dickerson
