= Never Make It Home =

Studio album by Split Lip Rayfield
- Released: February 20, 2001
- Genre: Bluegrass
- Label: Bloodshot Records

Split Lip Rayfield chronology
In The Mud (1999)	Never Make It Home (2001)	Live (2004)

Professional ratings
Review scores
Source	Rating
About.com	4/5 stars

Never Make It Home is the third studio album by the American Bluegrass band Split Lip Rayfield, released in 2001 (see 2001 in music).

== Track listing ==
All songs written by Kirk Rundstrom except where noted.

1. "Movin' To Virginia" (Gottstine) – 2:49
2. "Record Shop" – 3:41
3. "Never Make It Home" (Gottstine) – 3:10
4. "Thief" – 3:12
5. "Love Please Come Home" (E. Jackson) – 1:30
6. "Used To Call Me Baby" (Gottstine) – 3:34
7. "PB24SS" – 2:49
8. "Kiss of Death" (Mardis) – 4:16
9. "Drink Lotsa Whiskey" – 3:58
10. "Mister" – 2:21
11. "River" (Gottstine) – 4:04
12. "It's No Good" (Gottstine) – 3:46
13. "Dime Store Cowboy" – 1:56
14. "Day the Train Jumped the Tracks" (M. Carmody) – 2:15

== Personnel ==
- Kirk Rundstrom - Guitar, Vocals
- Wayne Gottstine - Mandolin, Vocals, Harmonica
- Eric Mardis - Banjo, Vocals
- Jeff Eaton - Gas Tank Bass, Vocals, Kazoo
