= Hobo (book) =

2002 book by Eddy Joe Cotton

Hobo: A Young Man's Thoughts on Trains and Tramping in America
- Author: Eddy Joe Cotton
- Language: English
- Genre: Autobiography
- Publisher: Harmony Books
- Publication date: 2002
- Publication place: United States
- ISBN: 0-609-60738-3

Hobo: A Young Man's Thoughts on Trains and Tramping in America, (ISBN 0-609-60738-3) is non-fiction, autobiographical book written by Eddy Joe Cotton (though this is a nickname, with his real name being Zebu Recchia).

== History ==
The book was first published in 2002 and describes the adventures of the author as he travels under the disguise of a hobo for over a year, keeping a detailed journal of his experiences and the lingo he learns along the way. His journey begins in Denver, Colorado and conclude in Las Vegas, Nevada, but he also passes through California, Nevada, Idaho, Montana, Utah, Wyoming, New Mexico, and Texas. Throughout the course of the book, the author manages to conceal his true identity and befriends and interacts with many true hobos, which he travels with and acts as an apprentice to.

While it is presumed that the events described in the book are genuine, the reference in Chapter 14 (dated November 14, 1991) refers to events at the Hard Rock Casino in Las Vegas. The Hard Rock was not opened until 1995.

The end of this book acts as a "hobo-dictionary", containing over a hundred commonly used slang terms in the hobo lexicon.
