= Vagabonds and Hooligans =

Studio album by Backyard Tire Fire
- Released: February 6, 2007
- Recorded: November 2005 – April 2006
- Genre: Indie rock
- Length: 48:51
- Label: o.i.e.
- Producers: Backyard Tire Fire & Tony SanFilippo

Backyard Tire Fire chronology
Bar Room Semantics (2005)	Vagabonds and Hooligans (2007)

Professional ratings
Review scores
Source	Rating
Allmusic	link
PopMatters	link

Vagabonds and Hooligans is the fifth album by Backyard Tire Fire, released on February 6, 2007.

== Track listing ==
All songs written by Ed Anderson.

1. "Vagabonds and Hooligans" – 3:47
2. "Undecided" – 3:32
3. "Green Eyed Soul" – 3:23
4. "Apparitions" – 3:34
5. "Corinne" – 6:16
6. "A Long Time" – 3:42
7. "Tom Petty" – 1:58
8. "The Wrong Hand" – 3:20
9. "Don't Know What To Do" – 2:15
10. "Get Wise" – 4:35
11. "Downtime" – 3:32
12. "It's a Good Night" – 3:01

== Personnel ==
- Ed Anderson – vocals, acoustic, electric, slide, and baritone guitars, keyboards, percussion
- Matt Anderson – bass, vocals, percussion
- Tim Kramp – drums, percussion, vocals

with

- Tony SanFilippo – synthesizers, percussion
- Jerry Erickson – pedal steel guitar, dobro, slide guitar on "Green Eyed Soul"
- Rob Hecht – violin
- Michael T. Gardner – organ
