= Yard Dogs Road Show =

American traveling cabaret

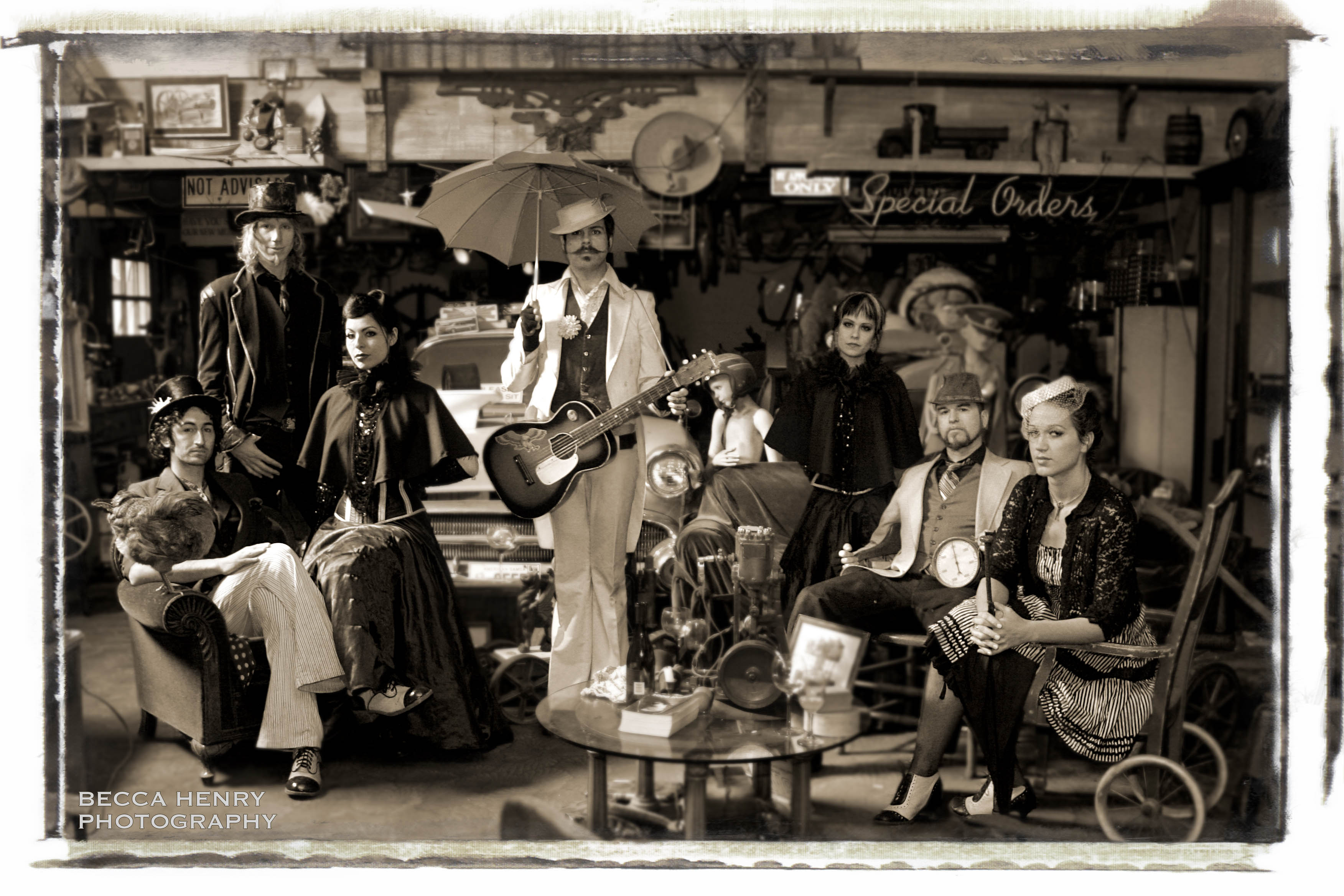
- Group photograph of the band.

Background information
- Origin: US
- Genres: Cabaret, Vaudeville
- Years active: 1999–present
- Website: www.yarddogsroadshow.com/

Yard Dogs Road Show is a thirteen-member traveling cabaret that features a blend of performances, including vaudeville, burlesque, stage magic, sideshow oddities, and beatnik "hobo poetry." Performances include musical interludes, song and dance numbers, and background music from the Yard Dogs cartoon heavy band. Originally from San Francisco, the Yard Dogs made their first full-fledged national tour in the Spring of 2005, playing 25 shows in 35 days with seven sold-out performances.

For use in this Wiki entry, the band's manager allowed the use of the song "Blockhead" as an example of their style

== History ==
The Yard Dogs began in 1998 as a three-piece traveling jug band formed by Yard Dogs founder Eddy Joe Cotton. The jug band started out playing in the road houses and dance halls of the west coast. During this time, band members took part in modern-day acid tests with the likes of Ken Kesey and the Merry Pranksters. For the next year, the band toured up and down the West Coast in a 1967 Ford Galaxy 500. It was on a cold night in 1999 that the band stopped to roll out their sleeping bags off Interstate 5 at a place called Dog Creek Road that the band found its new name and new calling. Thus the Yard Dogs Road Show was born.

One by one, the band attracted its colorful cast of performers. The band now sports such members as Tobias the Mystic Man (sword-swallower and magician), Guitar Boy (a spandex-sporting "guitar hero"), Hellvis (a musclebound fire-eater), and the Black and Blue Burlesque dancing girls. Founder Eddy Joe Cotton has also performed with They Might Be Giants and has been featured on NPR, West Coast Live, and To the Best of Our Knowledge. He is also the author of Hobo – A Young Man’s Thoughts On Trains And Tramping In America, which made it to the Denver Post best-seller list.

The Yard Dogs Road Show has performed at venues such as the Knitting Factory in Hollywood and NYC, the Wakarusa Festival in Lawrence, Kansas, the Bluebird Theater in Denver, Colorado and the Orpheum Theater in Flagstaff, Arizona. They have collaborated with Teatro ZinZanni, Red Bull, Lucasfilm, and New Belgium Brewery, and they participate in annual Native American cultural exchange festivals with the Quechan and Mohave tribes. Members have also collaborated with The Hall and Christ World of Wonders.

== Members ==
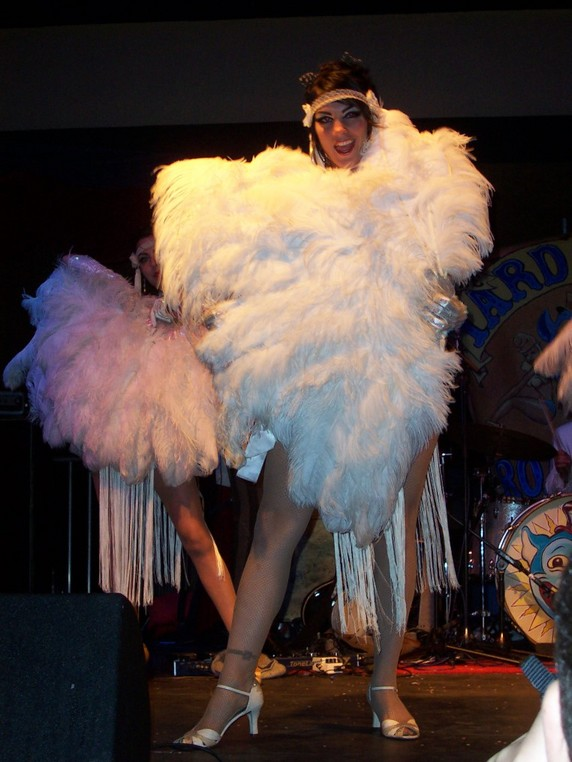
Yard Dogs Road Show fan dance in Long Beach, California for the Tattoo Expo at the Queen Mary

- Eddy Joe Cotton – Straw Boss & Founder
- Lily Rose Love – Singer & Trombone
- EEnor Wild Boar – Lead Guitar & Singer
- Micah D-Liscious – Bass Guitar & Showman
- Sidecar Tommy – Drums
- Kid Casbah -Trumpet & Special Effects
- Sansa Alexander Asylum III – Accordion & Singer
- Tobias the Mystic Man – Contraptions & Mysticism
- Broadway Freddie – Song & Dance Man
- Zoe Jakes – Burlesque & Belly Dancer
- Teri Lynn Sage – Burlesque Dancer
- Shenandoah Sassafras – Burlesque Dancer & Singer
- Richy– Sound Engineer

Honorary Members

- Leighton
- Bell Pod Jablinsky – Choreographer
- Gypsy Jablinsky

== Discography ==
The Fabulous Yard Dogs Road Show CD (2006)

1. Jug Jam
2. Driving Down the Road
3. St. James
4. Death March
5. Norton P. Electric
6. King of the Hobos
7. Red Light
8. Ricardo Del Fuego De Manga
9. Thou Art Hypnotized
10. Blockhead
11. Spectactometer
12. Guitar Boy
13. Tobias the Mystery Man
14. New Day
15. Turkey Neck Shuffle #23
