= Chris Berry =

American musician

Chris Berry is an American singer, songwriter, and musician. He plays the mbira (thumb piano) and the ngoma drum, from the Shona people of Southern Africa. His records with the band Panjea have gone platinum in Zimbabwe and Mozambique. He has released over a dozen albums; scored the soundtrack for three films; and collaborated and performed with many other artists.

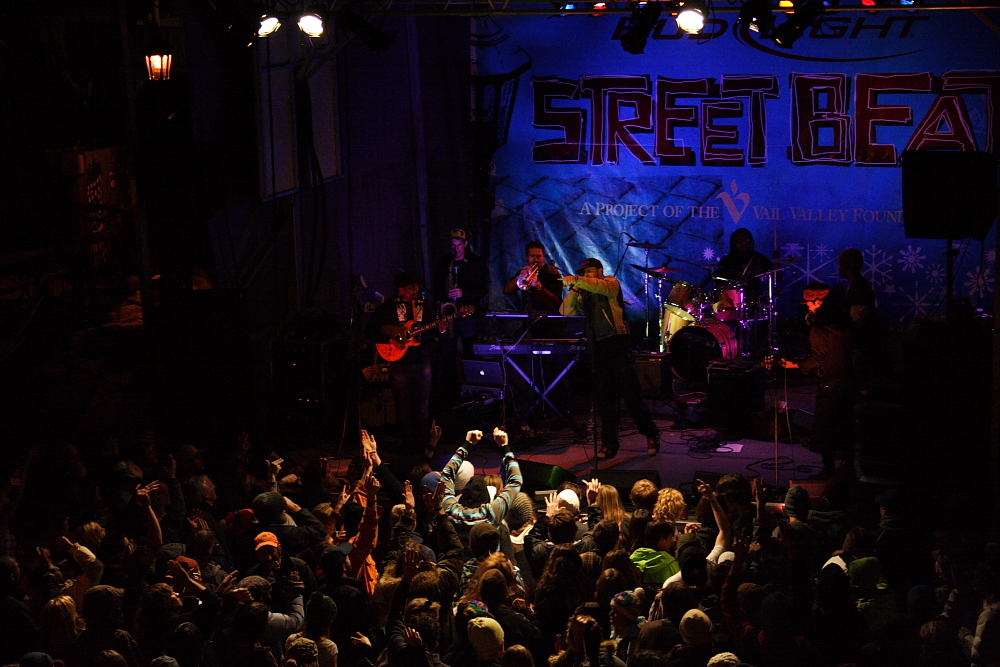
Chris Berry performing in Vail, CO w/ his band Panjea

== Early life ==
Berry was born and raised in California, the son of author Joy Berry. He began his apprenticeship in Sebastopol, California aged 15 with drummer Titos Sompa, one of the founders of the African drum and dance scene on the West Coast of the U.S.

== Career ==
Travelling with Sompa, he moved to Africa aged 19. Originally arriving in Congo’s Brazzaville, his fascination of Zimbabwean mbira music led him to Zimbabwe’s capital Harare, where he settled and studied under mbira master Monderek Muchena for ten years. Eight of these years were under the Mugabe Regime. During this time, Berry lived in ghettos and villages where he studied the music of the Shona people.

Encouraged by his teachers to create his own compositions, he formed the band Panjea, which fused funk with elements of hip-hop, Afro-pop and traditional African music. The band won a talent contest and secured a record deal. They had No. 1 hits on the radio, toured Africa, and reached Platinum on an album they recorded with Zimbabwean-based Gramma Records.

Berry was warned to leave Zimbabwe due to his lyrical opposition to the government. After four of Panjea's band members succumbed to AIDS, Berry left Zimbabwe. He has since been based in Brooklyn, NY and Hawaii.

Berry has toured North and Central America, Australia, New Zealand, Russia, Asia and Africa as a frontman and bandleader, and has headlined music festivals around the world. He performed the 2000 Olympics in Sydney, Australia; was guest musician and composer on Paul Winter's Grammy Award Winning 2005 "Silver Solstice" Album

Berry taught music and culture as a guest faculty member at Oberlin and Berklee Colleges of Music, University of Colorado Boulder, Williams College, Stanford University as well as his own Panjea Foundation for Cultural Education.

Berry spent six months working and recording with the Central African Republic Pymies to score the soundtrack for the film "Oka!"

Berry worked with Maverick label Kanaga System Krush on his album, "King Of Me", electrifying the mbira through a special bass and guitar rig; singing and playing bass, rhythm and melodies with Ivorian musician Abou Diarrassouba on drums.

== Reception ==
A reviewer for the Sydney Morning Herald found Berry's performance was "little more than merely showing off his undoubted virtuosity" and his lyrics were "idle platitudes".

Pop Matters said his 2006 album Dancemakers "fails spectacularly" and the lyrics are uninspired.
