= Split Lip Rayfield =

American musical group

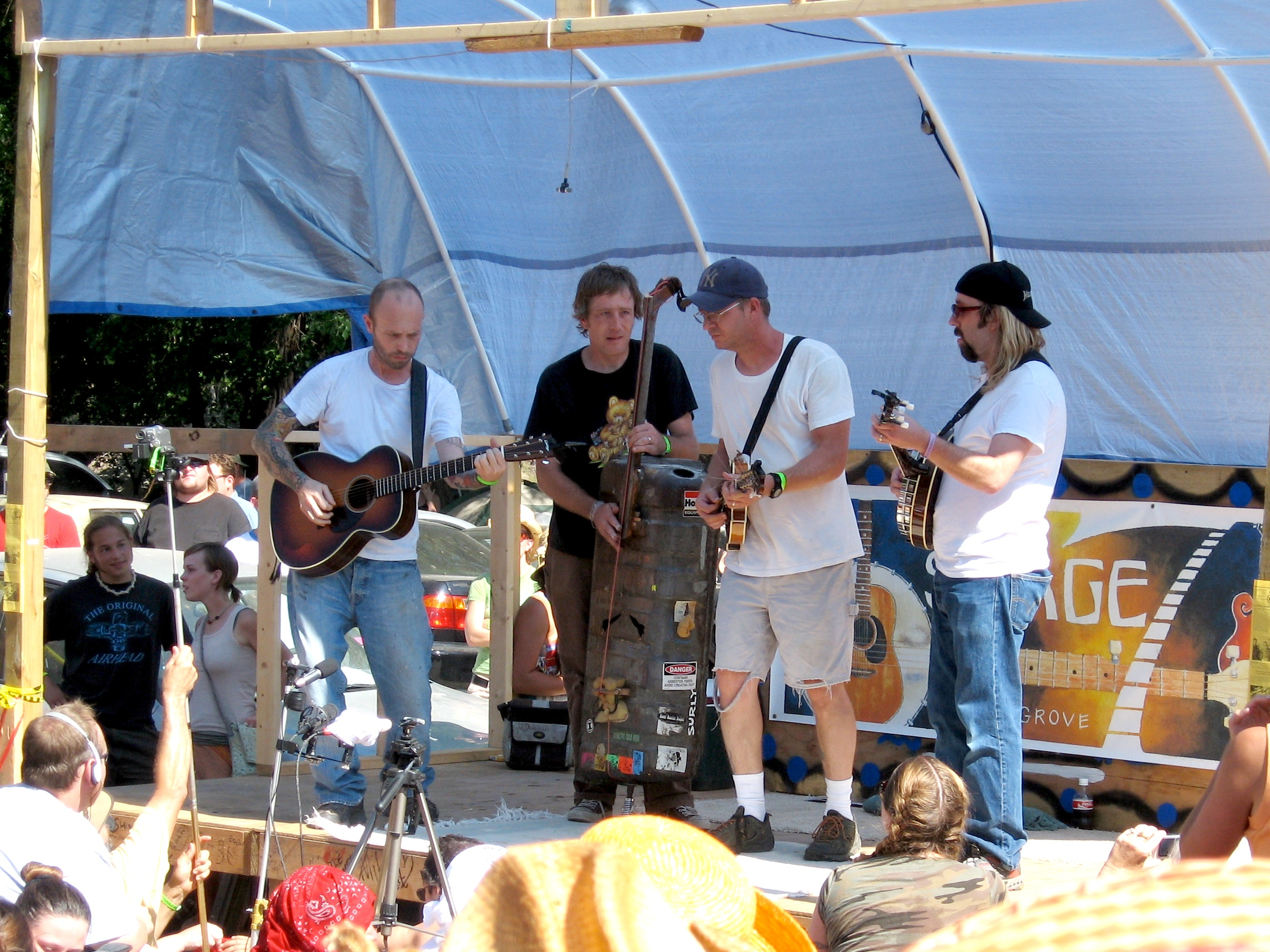

Background information
- Origin: Wichita, Kansas, U.S.
- Genres: Bluegrass, alternative country
- Years active: 1995–present
- Label: Bloodshot Records
- Members: Jeff Eaton; Wayne Gottstine; Eric Mardis
- Past members: Kirk Rundstrom (deceased); David Lawrence
- Website: Official Site

Split Lip Rayfield is an American vocal and acoustic instrumental group from Wichita, Kansas, United States. Though they are sometimes classified as a bluegrass, alternative country, or cowpunk band, their music draws on a wide array of influences.

== History ==
Split Lip Rayfield is a band from Wichita, Kansas featuring Kirk Rundstrom (guitar), Eric Mardis (banjo), Wayne Gottstine (mandolin), and Jeff Eaton (bass). Early on, the group's gimmick was Eaton's homemade one-string bass, named Stitchgiver, built from the gas tank of a 1978 Mercury Grand Marquis and a piece of hickory and strung with one piece of Weedwhacker line.

The name "Split Lip Rayfield" was inspired by a real-life person who went to high school with Eaton's parents in Desloge, Missouri. He acquired the nickname "Split Lip" due to constant chapped lips so bad his lip would split.

The trio of Rundstrom, Eaton and Mardis recorded the album Split Lip Rayfield in 1998; Bloodshot released it that same year.

In 1999, Split Lip Rayfield released In the Mud, the first album on which the group was joined by Gottstine and performed as a quartet. This album contained fan favorites such as Gottstine's "3.2 Flu", Rundstrom's "Devil", Mardis' "Hounds" and a cover of the George Jones/Melba Montgomery song "Easy Street". The band followed up the album's release with a nationwide tour.

The band's next album, Never Make It Home (2001), also achieved success, as did the subsequent tour.

Following the Never Make It Home tour, Split Lip Rayfield took a short hiatus so that its members could refocus on family life and side projects. Upon reassembling, the group traveled to New Orleans to make a record with friend and fellow performer Mike West. The resulting disc, Should Have Seen It Coming (2004), won critical praise.

In 2005, Gottstine left the touring group for personal reasons, but the remaining trio continued to tour. Gottstine returned in summer of 2006 after Kirk Rundstrom's cancer diagnosis.

In 2008, the group guest wrote various music pieces for an episode of the Adultswim show Squidbillies entitled Mephistopheles Traveled Below to a Southern State Whose Motto is 'Wisdom, Justice and Moderation'.

In 2008, the group released "I'll Be Around." The album was dedicated to the late Kirk Rundstrom and the title track is a tribute to him.

On January 7, 2017, the group released its sixth studio recording, "On My Way", their first in over eight years.

Jeff Eaton is the nephew of 1950s and 1960s fashion model Evelyn Tripp.

== Illness ==
Early in 2006, while on tour in Colorado, Rundstrom sought medical attention for pain in his throat and difficulty in swallowing. Doctors quickly concluded that he had esophageal cancer and would need immediate, intense treatment.

Heavy doses of radiation and chemotherapy were unable to completely reverse the damage, and Rundstrom's health suffered greatly from the treatments. However, by early autumn, he was playing shows again. Rundstrom was administered doses of intravenous vitamin C. He lived a year-and-a-half longer than doctors expected.

A fully reunited Split Lip Rayfield embarked on another tour and played what was billed as its final show on December 8, 2006, Live at the Cotillion Ballroom, in Wichita.

Rundstrom died on February 22, 2007, in Wichita. He is survived by his father, wife, and two daughters.

The group decided to continue playing without a replacement dedicating each show to Rundstrom. Gottstine rejoined the band permanently, and their first show without Rundstrom was in August 2007.

In 2011, the feature documentary Never Make It Home was released. It was originally intended as a concert film, but eight months into filming, Rundstrom's diagnosis changed director G.J. Echternkamp's plans. The result is an intimate portrait of the musician's final days.

== Influence ==
Split Lip Rayfield helped pioneer what came to be known as the "Stage Five" sound, named for the notorious "unofficial" Stage 5 at the annual Walnut Valley Festival in Winfield, Kansas.

Typically, bluegrass musicians played traditional folk and country songs on acoustic string instruments. Bands like Split Lip faithfully used traditional acoustic instruments but played songs that were more closely related stylistically to rock, punk, or heavy metal.

Although Split Lip was not the first of its kind — other groups such as the Bad Livers came before — a growing number of acoustic "thrash-grass" bands owe a great debt to Split Lip for helping to define the genre.

== Discography ==
=== Studio albums ===
- Split Lip Rayfield (1998)
- In The Mud (1999)
- Never Make It Home (2001)
- Should Have Seen It Coming (2004)
- I'll Be Around (2008)
- On My Way (2017)

=== Live albums ===
- Live (2004)
- Live at the Bluebird (2006)

=== 7" record ===
- Old #6 b/w How Many Biscuits Can You Eat

=== DVDs ===
- Live at the Cotillion Ballroom (2007)
