= That 1 Guy =

American musician

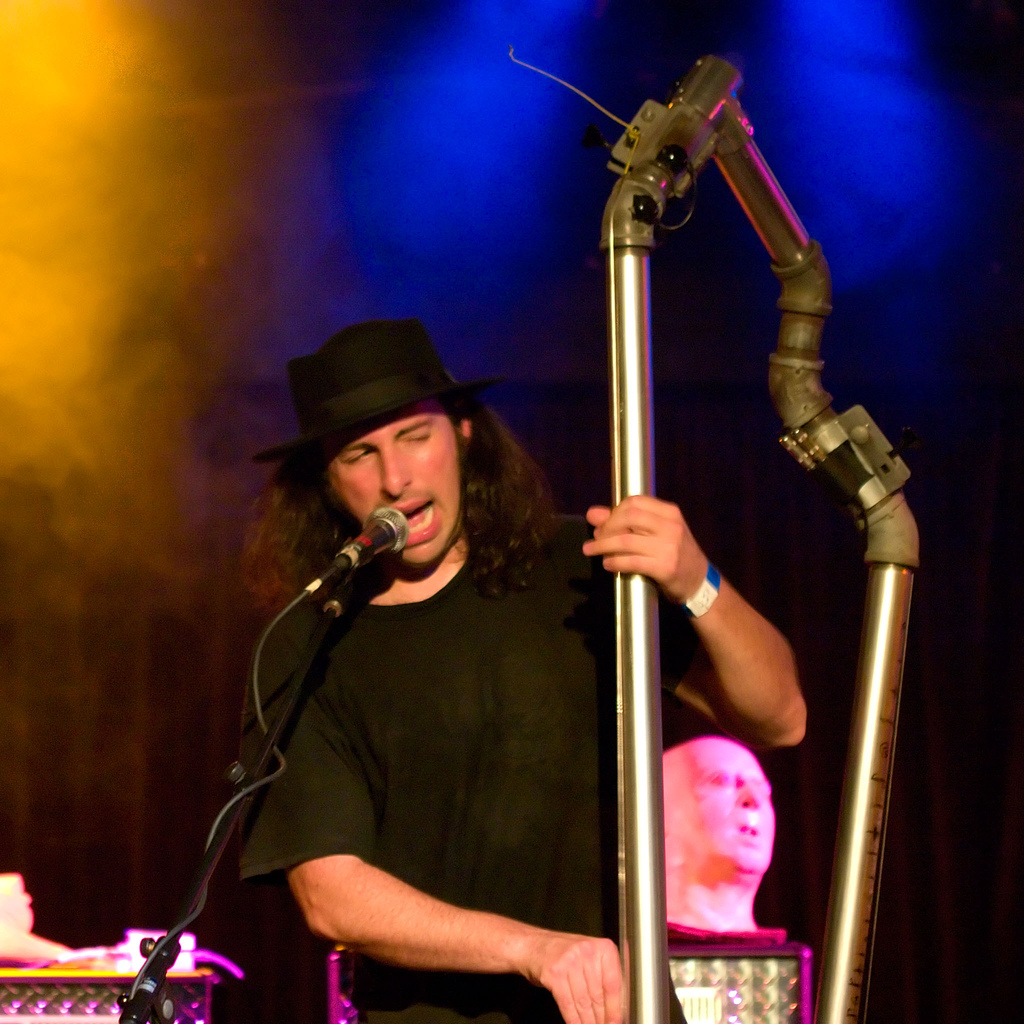
- That 1 Guy playing the Magic Pipe in 2006

Background information
- Born: Mike Silverman
- Genres: Rhythm & Sound, Experimental music, funk, jazz, Romany Hip Hop
- Occupations: Singer-songwriter, musician
- Instruments: The Magic Pipe, the Magic boot, the saw, bass, percussion, vocals
- Years active: 1990s–present
- Label: Righteous Babe
- Website: that1guy.com

Mike Silverman, better known as That 1 Guy, is an American musician based in Las Vegas, Nevada. He frequently performs and records as a one-man band, singing and using a variety of homemade musical instruments.

== Career ==
=== Early career ===
Silverman is a classically trained double bass player who attended the San Francisco Conservatory of Music and developed a career in the progressive jazz scene in the 1990s, performing live and as a studio musician. He started out in a funk, rockabilly, jazz band called "The Fabulous Hedgehogs" before he developed his own style of solo playing and gained a reputation as a one-man rhythm section, incorporating traditional and slap-bass playing with percussive elements using the body of the instrument. When he began to feel limited by his instrument and a heavy schedule of playing and recording for other people, he started to devise a new instrument that would allow him the range to create his own music. At first he sought out professional help in building his instrument, but decided to make it himself because of the projected cost. The end result was the Magic Pipe, a 7-foot-tall (2.1 m) collection of steel plumbing pipes and joints, orchestral bass strings, and electronics.

=== As That 1 Guy ===
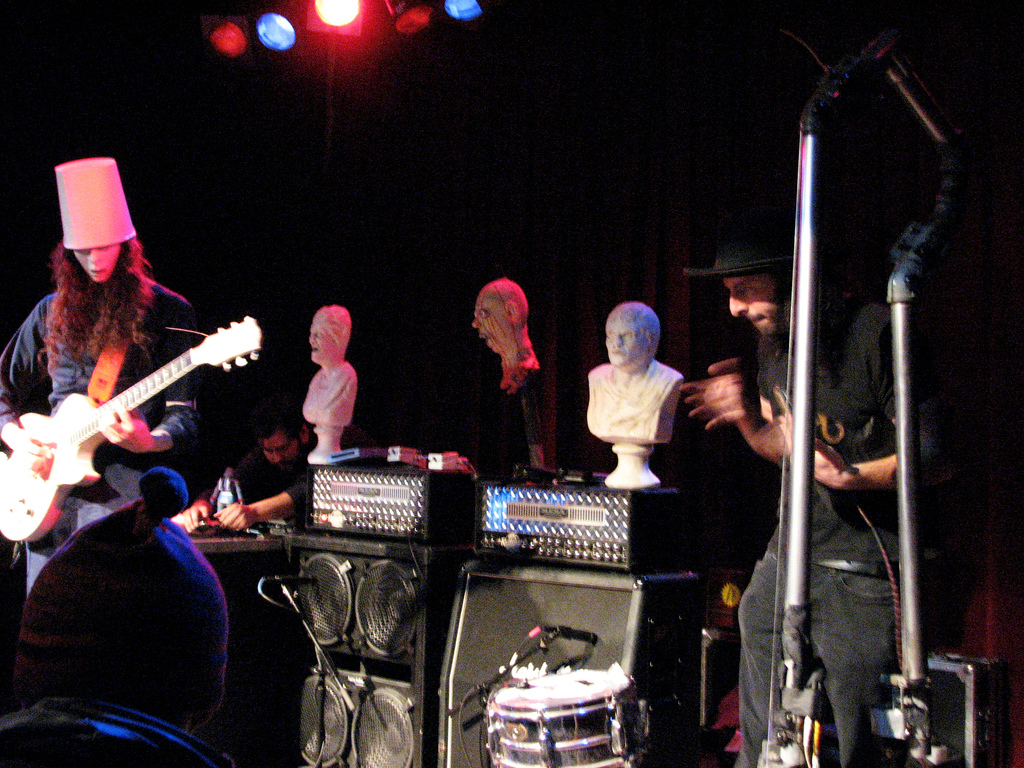
Silverman performing with Buckethead

Since then, Silverman has developed a career as a one-man band under the stage name That 1 Guy, first playing his upright bass, and later singing and beatboxing while playing his Magic Pipe, musical saw, various percussive elements, and using digital looping and sampling to perform his songs. His musical influences include Drums and Tuba, Rush, Frank Zappa, Captain Beefheart, and Dr. Seuss, both in terms of his lyrics and his quirky homemade instruments. He has also been influenced by Tom Waits, and was invited to play saw (and subsequently bass) on tracks for Waits’ Orphans: Brawlers, Bawlers & Bastards album. He has a cult following in the United States of America, as well as in Australia, which he has toured several times, including performances at major festivals such as Big Day Out, Pyramid Rock Festival, and Woodford Folk Festival. He has also played many shows alongside avant-garde guitarist Buckethead, with whom he released a collaborative album under the name Frankenstein Brothers in 2008. He has received little mainstream recognition, but did garner attention after the use of his song "Buttmachine" (from his second album, The Moon is Disgusting) on Showtime's original comedy series Weeds, season 3, episode 9. He started a tour throughout the United States of America in early 2009, and performed at festivals in Canada and France.

== Instruments ==
=== The Magic Pipe ===
The Magic Pipe is a homemade, electronically rigged pair of machined aluminum pipes (previously steel in its first incarnation), connected by adjustable phosphorus bronze joints, with each pipe hosting an orchestral bass string. The harp-shaped instrument is roughly seven feet tall and features 13 midi trigger points, which can be mapped to various musical sound effects or samples. The front pipe uses a low C string, while the rear pipe's string is a high G string used to achieve more tenor ranged notes. The pipes themselves are employed to produce various percussive sounds while That 1 Guy slaps, plucks, or bows the strings, as well as occasionally using a drum stick to sound the strings and the pipes at the same time. The creation of the Magic Pipe was based on Silverman's double bass experience, as well as borrowing from the concepts of the gutbucket and the diddley bow.

=== The Magic Boot ===
The Magic Boot is a scorpion-emblazoned cowboy boot, which is wired and fed through the Magic Pipe's audio lines. It is then played as a percussive instrument by tapping on the sole while pinching the boot's opening to achieve different sounds, similar to an African talking drum.

=== The Magic Saw ===
The Magic Saw is a musical saw, which is wired into the main effects box. It uses a small adhesive speaker and is played percussively as well as with a violin bow. It sounds similar to a theremin when played and renditions of "Somewhere Over the Rainbow" have been performed on numerous occasions.

== Discography ==
=== Studio albums ===
- Let's Hear That 1 Guy (1996)
- Songs in the Key of Beotch (2000, re-released 2004)
- The Moon Is Disgusting (2007)
- Mustaches Remix EP (2009)
- Packs a Wallop! (2010)
- Poseidon's Deep Water Adventure Friends (2014)
- Set the Controls for the Heart of the Buttnoggin (2020)

=== Frankenstein Brothers (with Buckethead) ===
- Bolt on Neck (2008)

=== DVD ===
- Live in the Land of Oz (DVD, 2007)
