= Backyard Tire Fire =

American band

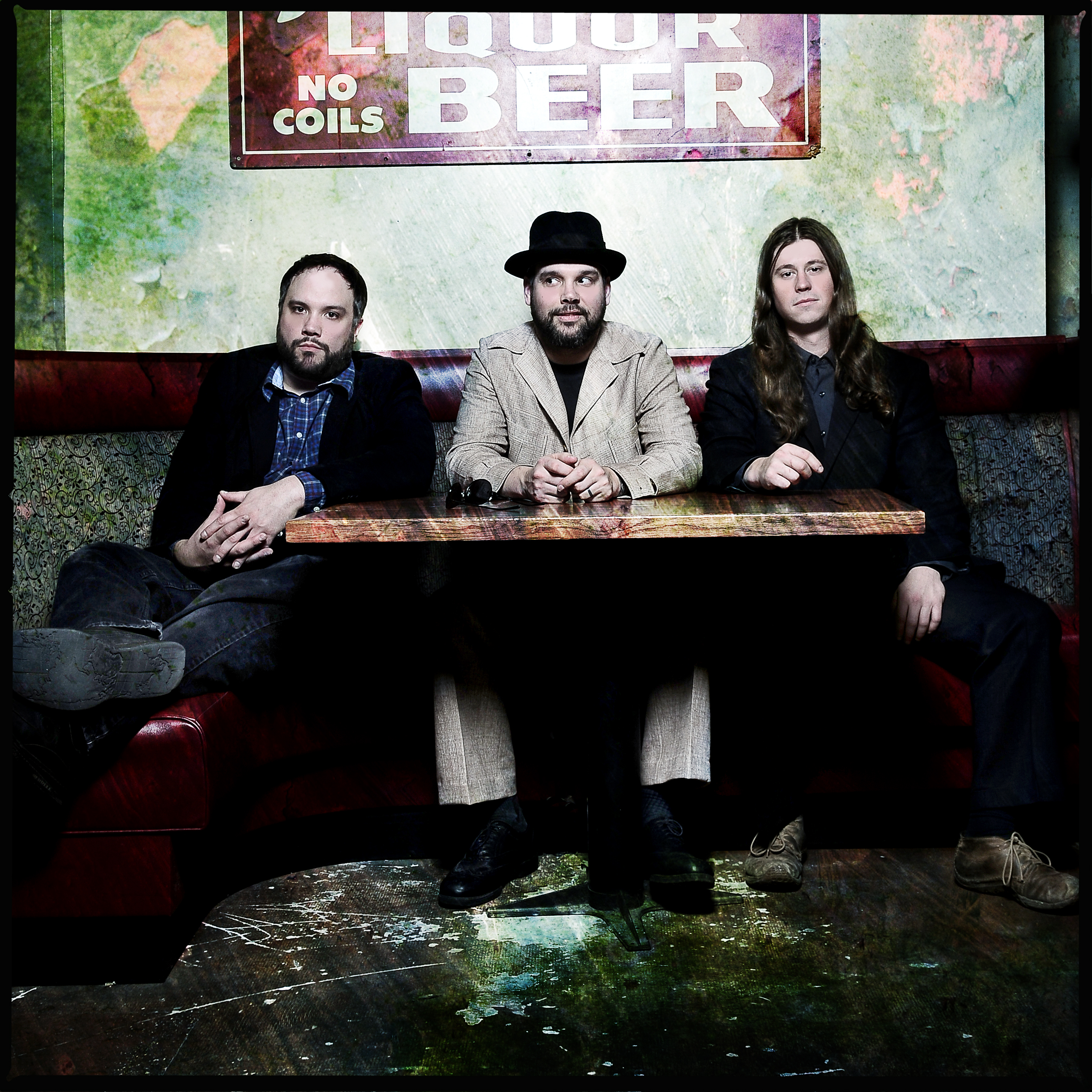
- Backyard Tire Fire

Background information
- Origin: Bloomington, Illinois, United States
- Genre: Alternative country
- Years active: 2001–2011
- Label: HYENA Records/Kelsey Street Records
- Members: Edward David Anderson; Matt Anderson; Tim Kramp

Backyard Tire Fire is an American band that formed in Asheville, North Carolina in 2001.

== History ==
The band began in the fall of 2001 with founding members Edward David Anderson (songwriter, vocals, guitars), Tim Kramp (drums, percussion) Warren Hawk (bass guitar) and John Walker (hammond organ, fender rhodes). After a few line-up changes, the band moved from Asheville to Athens, Georgia in 2002. They (along with then-bass player Warren Hawk) released their first album, Live at the Georgia Theatre, later that year.

After the release of their debut album, Backyard Tire Fire relocated to Bloomington, Illinois and added Anderson's brother Matt (bass, vocals) into the mix. The Anderson brothers originally grew up in St. Charles, Illinois. Tim Kramp grew up in Bloomington, and Edward David Anderson received a master's degree from Illinois State University (located in Normal, Bloomington's sister town).

They recorded and released their first self-titled studio record in 2003, which was co-produced by Tony SanFilippo and recorded in analog at SanFilippo's Oxide Lounge in Bloomington. This began the relationship between BTF and SanFilippo, who co-produced and recorded their next three albums and two EPs.

2005 brought the release of Bar Room Semantics, which was the band's first record to receive national recognition by the press, including Harp Magazine and AllMusic.com.

The band began touring heavily on a national scale in 2006, supporting artists like the Mother Hips, Will Hoge, and North Mississippi Allstars. They also played at festivals including South by Southwest, High Sierra Music Festival in California, and 10,000 Lakes Festival in Minnesota.

Vagabonds and Hooligans was released February 6, 2007, and received a larger national spotlight, with praise coming from USA Today, PopMatters.com, and influential bloggers including My Old Kentucky Blog and An Aquarium Drunkard.

The band continued their heavy touring, playing close to 150 shows that year, with a diverse mix of bands including William Elliot Whitmore, Melissa Ferrick, JJ Grey & MOFRO, Clutch, and Cracker. The supporting slots with Cracker brought them praise from Johnny Hickman, who became an ardent supporter of the band, saying, "My favorite band right now is Backyard Tire Fire and they sometimes remind me of early Wilco, Son Volt and Flaming Lips. And they unabashedly name check both Wayne Coyne and Tom Petty in song. They are my earworm the last few months."

2008 found the band signed to NYC-based label HYENA Records for the release of The Places We Lived on August 26, 2008. This marked a stylistic departure for the band, as a portion of the record focused on piano-based songs such as "Everybody's Down", "Rainy Day Don't Go Away" and "The Places We Lived". The record continued their national growth in the press; they were a Paste Magazine "Band of the Week", and received heavy airplay from nationally syndicated radio programs like Mountain Stage and Acoustic Cafe, Sirius/XM's Loft and XMU, and non-commercial AAA radio stations like Louisville's WFPK, Asheville's WNCW, and Cincinnati's WNKU, as well as commercial AAA radio station KHUM in Eureka, California. They continued their heavy touring, which found them on the road with old Athens friends Bloodkin, Lynyrd Skynryd's Simple Man Cruise, Reverend Horton Heat, Nashville Pussy, Ha Ha Tonka, Rose Hill Drive, and a fortuitous support slot for Los Lobos in the band's hometown of Bloomington. The support slot introduced the band to Steve Berlin, who soon signed on to produce their next record.

Good to Be, the band's fifth studio album, was released on February 16, 2010, on the band's Kelsey Street Records label, distributed by Thirty Tigers/Sony-Red. It was produced by Los Lobos' Steve Berlin and recorded on analog in Portland, OR's Type Foundry Studio. Prominent northwest engineer Jeff Stuart Saltzman recorded and mixed the record. The band performed multiple tracks from the record on their Sun Studio Sessions appearance, including "Brady," which aired on PBS affiliates in 2011.

On September 1, 2011, the group announced that they would be going on "indefinite hiatus." They reunited in Chicago at the Cubby Bear on November 23, 2013 to perform a set at UP AND AT THEM! A BENEFIT TO END MS.

Frontman Edward David Anderson continues to write, record and tour solo. He has released two albums, Lies & Wishes (2014, produced by Steve Berlin) and Lower Alabama: The Loxley Sessions (2015, produced by Anthony Crawford). He planned to release his third, Chasing Butterflies (produced by Jimmy Nutt), in October 2018.

== Discography ==
- Live at the Georgia Theatre (2002)
- Backyard Tire Fire (2003)
- Bar Room Semantics (2005)
- Skin and Bones (2006)
- Vagabonds and Hooligans (2007)
- Sick of Debt (2008)
- The Places We Lived (2008)
- Good to Be (2010)
