= RAQ =

American psychedelic/progressive rock jam band

- Origin: Burlington, Vermont, USA
- Genres: Psychedelic rock, progressive rock
- Years active: 2001–present
- Members: Jay Burwick; Chris Michetti; Todd Stoops; Any drummer they can find
- Past members: Marc Scortino; Greg Stukey

RAQ (/ˈræk/) are a psychedelic/progressive rock jam band quartet from Burlington, Vermont.

== History ==
The group was formed in 2000 with original keyboard player Marc Scortino. Their first studio effort "Shed Tech" was released a year later. In 2002, Scortino left the band and was replaced by Todd Stoops. Along with Chris Michetti (Guitar), Jay Burwick (Bass) and Greg Stukey (Drums) the band would release their second album "Carbohydrates Are The Enemy" later in the year and embark on their first national tour. In 2006, Harmonized Records signed RAQ and helped release their third studio album "Ton These". In 2013, the band re-formed with Adrian Tramantano on drums.

In a 2004 article, music writer Eric Ward Glide Magazine stated, "They've invented the concept of jambands even having an old school style to bring back in the first place."

RAQ ended a 20-month hiatus with the announcement of a show on April 30, 2010 at the Bowery Ballroom in New York City. During the hiatus, Chris Michetti toured with his own band called Michetti. The band originally included Rob O'Dea on bass and Tim Sharbough on drums. Sharbough was eventually replaced by Greg Stukey. Jay Burwick opened with a solo acoustic set for Michetti on a short tour in early 2009, usually joined by Michetti for one or two songs. Michetti usually performed a mix of new songs and various covers, while Burwick performed a mix of new songs, humorous covers, and older RAQ songs.

Todd Stoops co-founded his project, Kung Fu. The band is composed of Chris DeAngelis on bass, Tim Palmieri on guitar, Adrian Tramantano on drums, and Rob Somerville on tenor and soprano saxophone.

== Touring ==
In its first national tour in 2002, the quartet played at North American musical festivals including Tennessee's Bonnaroo Music Festival, California's High Sierra Music Festival, Wakarusa Music and Camping Festival, Florida's Langerado Music Festival, New York's moe.down, Massachusett's Berkshire Mountain Music Festival, and Vermont's Garden of Eden Festival. The band has also appeared at venues such as the Great American Music Hall in San Francisco and the Knitting Factory in New York City. RAQ completed a tour of Colorado performing in front of sold out crowds in Telluride, Denver and Breckenridge.

== Recognition ==
RAQ was chosen as a 'New Groove of the Month' by Jambands.com, and nominated for a Jammy Award in the category of 'Best New Band'. Relix Magazine featured the band in its Spotlight section, saying "RAQ has the ability to captivate an audience, dropping jaws with hyperkinetic improvisational splendor." The band was also highlighted by Relix as one of the top bands to look out for in the summer of 2005.

== Discography ==
=== Shed Tech ===
Released: March 1, 2001 (debut album – currently out of print)

==== Artists ====
- Marc Scortino: Keyboards and vocals
- Chris Michetti: Guitar and vocals
- Greg Stukey: Drums
- Jay Burwick: Bass and vocals

==== Track listing ====
1. Time Bomb
2. There When I Land
3. Verde Burro
4. Tunnel Vision
5. Hot Wired
6. Confuzor
7. Weakling
8. Guilty Pleasure
9. Last Bag
10. Welcome to the Donkey Show

=== Carbohydrates ===
Released: 2002

RAQ's second release and first to feature keyboardist, Todd Stoops. The album was produced by Grammy Award winner Mark Johnson (Paul Simon, Los Lobos, Jackson Browne) in Colchester Vermont at Egan Media Productions, and mixed by Johnson in Los Angeles.

==== Artists ====
- Todd Stoops: Keyboards and vocals
- Chris Michetti: Guitar and vocals
- Greg Stukey: Drums
- Jay Burwick: Bass and vocals

==== Track listing ====
1. Shirley Be a Drooler
2. TheDownLow
3. Beauregard
4. Georgia
5. Brother from Another Mother
6. The Hunter Becomes the Hunted
7. Circumstance
8. Carbohydrates Are The Enemy
9. Sweet Cream Butter
10. Hannah Can
11. Barometric Whether
12. The Anthem of Beauregard

=== Ton These ===
Released: 2006

RAQ's third album. Recorded at Phish guitarist Trey Anastasio's recording studio The Barn, in Vermont.

==== Artists ====
- Todd Stoops: Keyboards and vocals
- Chris Michetti: Guitar and vocals
- Greg Stukey: Drums
- Jay Burwick: Bass and vocals

==== Track listing ====
1. Walking in Circles
2. Forget Me Not
3. Tumbling Down
4. Glimpse
5. Lush of Lush
6. Bootch Magoo
7. Will Run
8. City Funk
9. One of These Days
10. Said & Done
11. The Whistler
12. Botz
