= Drums & Tuba =

American musical group

- Origin: Austin, Texas (later based in New York City)
- Genres: Instrumental rock, alternative rock
- Years active: 1995–2005
- Label: Righteous Babe Records
- Members: Brian Wolff, Tony Nozero, Neal McKeeby

Drums & Tuba was an instrumental rock group. The band formed in Austin, Texas, before relocating to New York City. Their sound fuses electronic rock, progressive rock, jazz and occasionally industrial. They were signed to Righteous Babe Records.

== History ==
The group began as a duo with Brian Wolff, who was a student at the University of Texas, and Tony Nozero performing weekend nights for tips on Sixth Street in downtown Austin. The band was originally called "Just Drums & Tuba" and consisted only of a drummer (Nozero) and tuba player (Wolff). They eventually added a guitarist (Neal McKeeby) to their lineup. Their first two albums accurately represent their sound in the early years.

Wolff was innovative in that he took an uncommon rock instrument (tuba) and added effects commonly used by guitarists. In the late 90's, Wolff also started experimenting with looping via a loop pedal. Wolff also started adding effects to the drums by sending the drum mic cable through his effect board instead of directly to the PA. This created new possibilities and new sounds. The result was Flathead and Spoonies.

Around this time, they continued to gig around Texas. Around 2000, they moved to New York where they widened their audience and started to tour the country. They continued to hone their use of loops and effects and this is reflected in their subsequent album Vinyl Killer.

From 2000-2005, they toured around the US, and produced two more albums, Gas Up, Blow Up, and Live - a collection of songs recorded live from their tours. The height of their success might have come in 2001 when they toured with super group Oysterhead (featuring Trey Anastasio (Phish), Les Claypool (Primus) and Stewart Copeland (Police). They also toured Europe with Cake around this time.

In 2005, they introduced vocals (Nozero was the singer) and recorded Battles Ole.

== Musical style ==
Their music combined many disparate genres, including jazz fusion, alternative hip hop, and hardcore punk. Their live performances sometimes included McKeeby playing two guitars simultaneously, and Wolff using effects boards as well as his tuba. They have been compared to Sonic Youth, Soul Coughing, the guitar sound of Grateful Dead, Isotope 217, and Tortoise.

== Discography ==
- Box Fetish (1997)
- Flying Ballerina (1998)
- Flatheads & Spoonies (1999)
- Vinyl Killer (2001)
- Mostly Ape (2002)
- Live: Hoboken, NJ 5/14/2004 (2004)
- El Tubador/The Peleton (2005)
- Battles Ole (2005)

== Lineup ==
- Drums - Tony Nozero
- Tuba - Brian Wolff
- Guitar - Neal McKeeby
- Andrew Gilchrist (on The Peloton/El Tubador)
