= Ten Mile Tide =

US musical group

Ten Mile Tide is a folk rock indie band originating from San Francisco.

== Origins and members ==
Twin brothers Jason and Justin Munning started the band in 1999 at Stanford University along with Steve Kessler, Marc Mazzoni, Bryan Jayne, and Brooks Dubose. Jeff Clemetson, Kristen Kessler, and Matt Mitchell joined on to form the core of the band which toured in different formats full-time for over 6 years.

During the mid 2000s, Ten Mile Tide served as the house band for The University of Vermont Outing Club Fest each September. The band either headlined or was a supporting act from 2002-2006, performing hits like Remember, Sweet Girl, and Never Gonna Drink Again.

== Opinions on digital piracy ==
Ten Mile Tide was well known for its relatively positive opinions on file sharing. Justin Munning stated that file sharing of the band's music on websites such as Kazaa had boosted sales and opened up opportunities for touring that otherwise would not have been accessible to the band. Munning also expressed a belief that the advent of internet file sharing would lead to more significant success among independent musicians as new opportunities arose to gather fans and attention outside of the influence of record labels.

== Discography ==
- Flow (2001)
- Midnight is Early (2003)
- Ten Mile Tide (2006)
- Riverstone (2008)
