= Langerado =

Floridian music festival

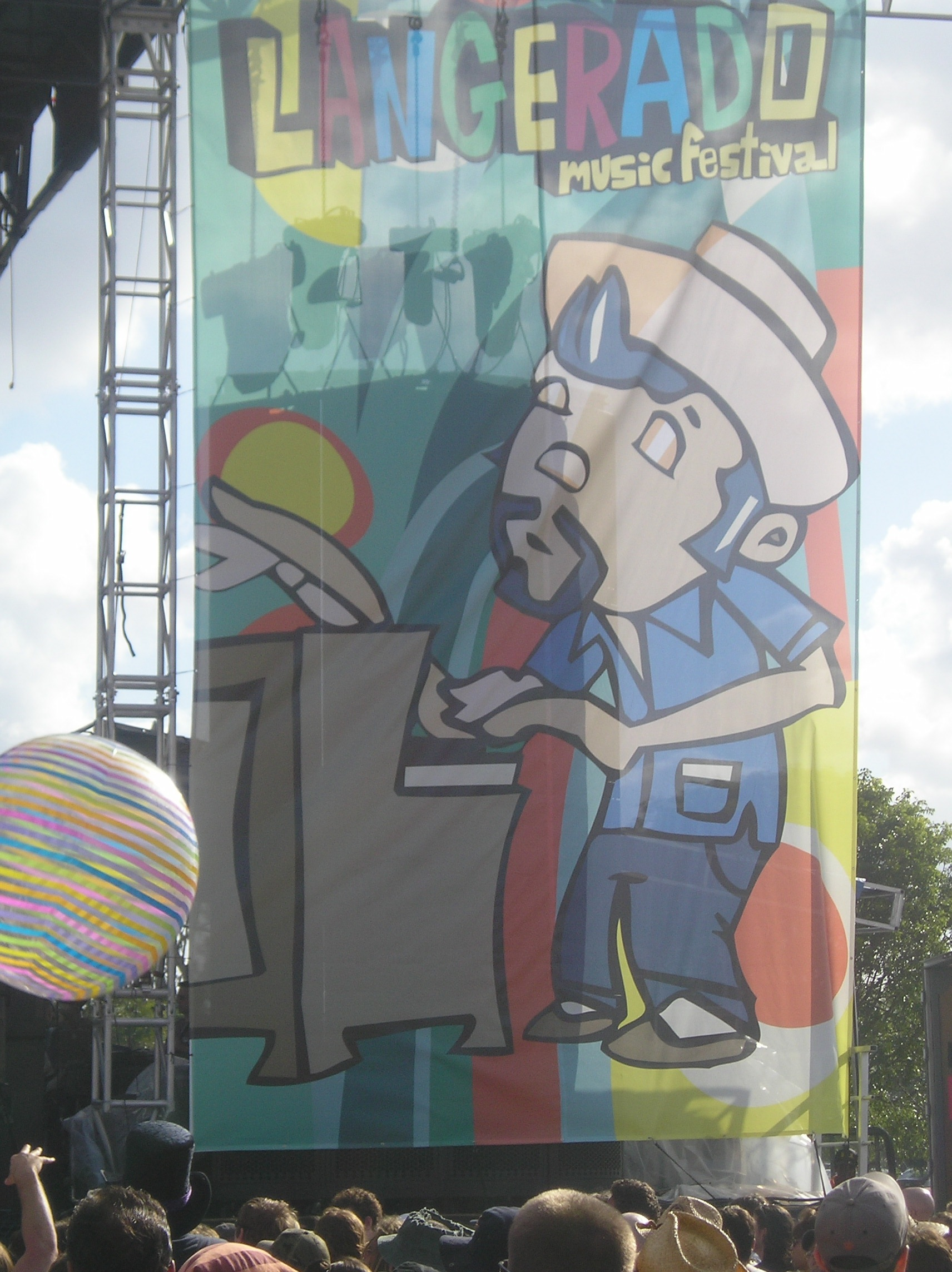
- Festival Banner
- Genre: Jamband
- Location: Florida
- Website: Langerado Official Website

Langerado Music Festival was an annual music festival, taking place in early spring in South Florida, first organized in 2003 by Ethan Schwartz. In 2008, the festival was held at the Seminole Big Cypress Indian Reservation in the Everglades. The festival featured primarily music of the jamband genre, but also offered a wide selection of other musical styles and traditionally offered a stage for local bands, as well. In March 2011, Langerado announced that it would be returning after being backed by Boros Entertainment. On june 1, 2011, tickets went on sale for the 2011 festival. Though on September 3, 2011 the festival would be canceled stating the reason to be Boros Entertainment cancelling the event. Some attribute the failure of Langerado to their unexpected growth, while others attribute their failure to poor timing and lack of talent of the musicians participating.

== Past Langerado Festivals ==
- 2009 Langerado Music Festival
- 2008 Langerado Music Festival
- 2007 Langerado Music Festival
- 2006 Langerado Music Festival
- 2005 Langerado Music Festival
- 2004 Langerado Music Festival
- 2003 Langerado Music Festival

== See also ==
- List of jam band music festivals
