= I'll Be Around (album) =

Studio album by Split Lip Rayfield
- Released: October 15, 2008
- Genre: Bluegrass

Split Lip Rayfield chronology
Live at the Bluebird (2006)	I'll Be Around (2008)

Professional ratings
Review scores
Source	Rating
Country Standard Time	(not rated) link

I'll Be Around is the fifth studio album by the American bluegrass band Split Lip Rayfield, released on October 15, 2008 (see 2008 in music). It is significant in that this is the first studio album after former guitar player Kirk Rundstrom's death, and its dedication to his memory. Also of note in the liner notes is a set of instructions for the building of the famous "Gas-Tank Bass" of Jeff Eaton.

== Track listing ==
(composer in parentheses)

1. Rig or Cross (Mardis) 2:32
2. All the Same (Gottstine) 2:37
3. Aces High (Mardis) 3:25
4. Heart of Darkness (Gottstine) 2:49
5. Factory (Gottstine) 2:05
6. The High Price of Necromancy (Mardis) 2:23
7. Fallen (Gottstine) 3:40
8. Hobo Love Song (Gottstine) 2:14
9. Devil Lies (Mardis) 3:16
10. It's Been So Long (Gottstine) 3:55
11. Sin River (Gottstine) 1:46
12. I'll Be Around (Mardis) 3:57

== Personnel ==
- Jeff Eaton - Gas-Tank Bass, Backing vocals
- Wayne Gottstine - Mandolin, Vocals
- Eric Mardis - Banjo, Vocals
