= All Good Music Festival =

American annual music event

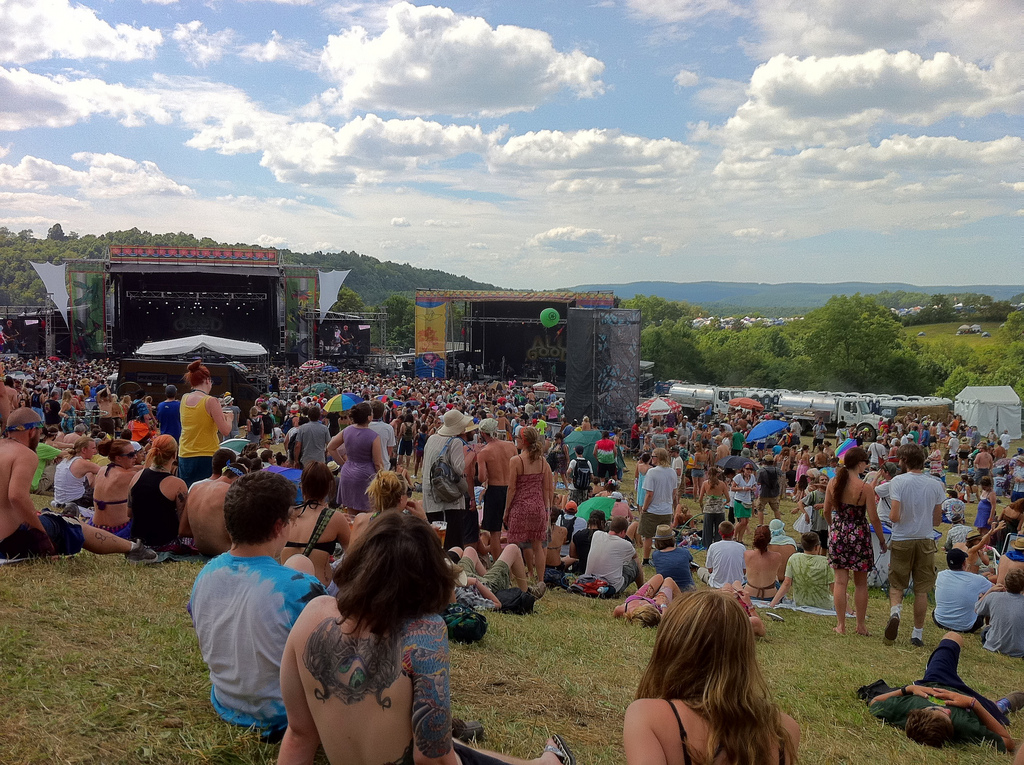
- All Good Music Festival on Marvin's Mountaintop above Masontown, West Virginia USA July 15, 2011.
- Genre: Jam band, rock music, bluegrass music, music
- Dates: third weekend in July
- Locations: Summit Point, West Virginia, United States
- Years active: 1997–2013, 2015
- Founders: Tim Walther
- Website: www.allgoodfestival.com/

The All Good Music Festival and Camp Out was a weekend-long event held annually in July. Since its inception in 1997, it had been held at venues along the Mid-Atlantic, including Trip's Farm (Terra Alta) Masontown, West Virginia, Brandywine, Maryland, and, most notably, Marvin's Mountaintop. It moved to Legend Valley in Thornville, Ohio in 2012. All Good announced they would be taking a short hiatus in 2014 and would not be having a festival. They returned in 2015 in Summit Point, West Virginia. Headlining acts were Primus, moe. and Cake. In 2016, it was announced the festival had been retired and would be replaced by a two-day event at Merriweather Post Pavilion.

== Background ==
The event was organized by Walther Productions and included mostly jam and folk acts, though the festival had expanded its musical repertoire to include reggae, hip-hop fusion, bluegrass, funk, and rock. The 15th Annual festival was held July 14–17, 2011, on Marvin's Mountain Top in Masontown, West Virginia. The lineup had included artists such as Furthur, Derek Trucks, Railroad Earth, Keller Williams, The Flaming Lips, Phil Lesh and Friends, Widespread Panic, Umphrey's McGee, The String Cheese Incident, Les Claypool, Ratdog, Moe., Lotus, Bassnectar, Old Crow Medicine Show, The New Deal, Grace Potter and the Nocturnals, Yonder Mountain String Band, Dark Star Orchestra, and Leftover Salmon.

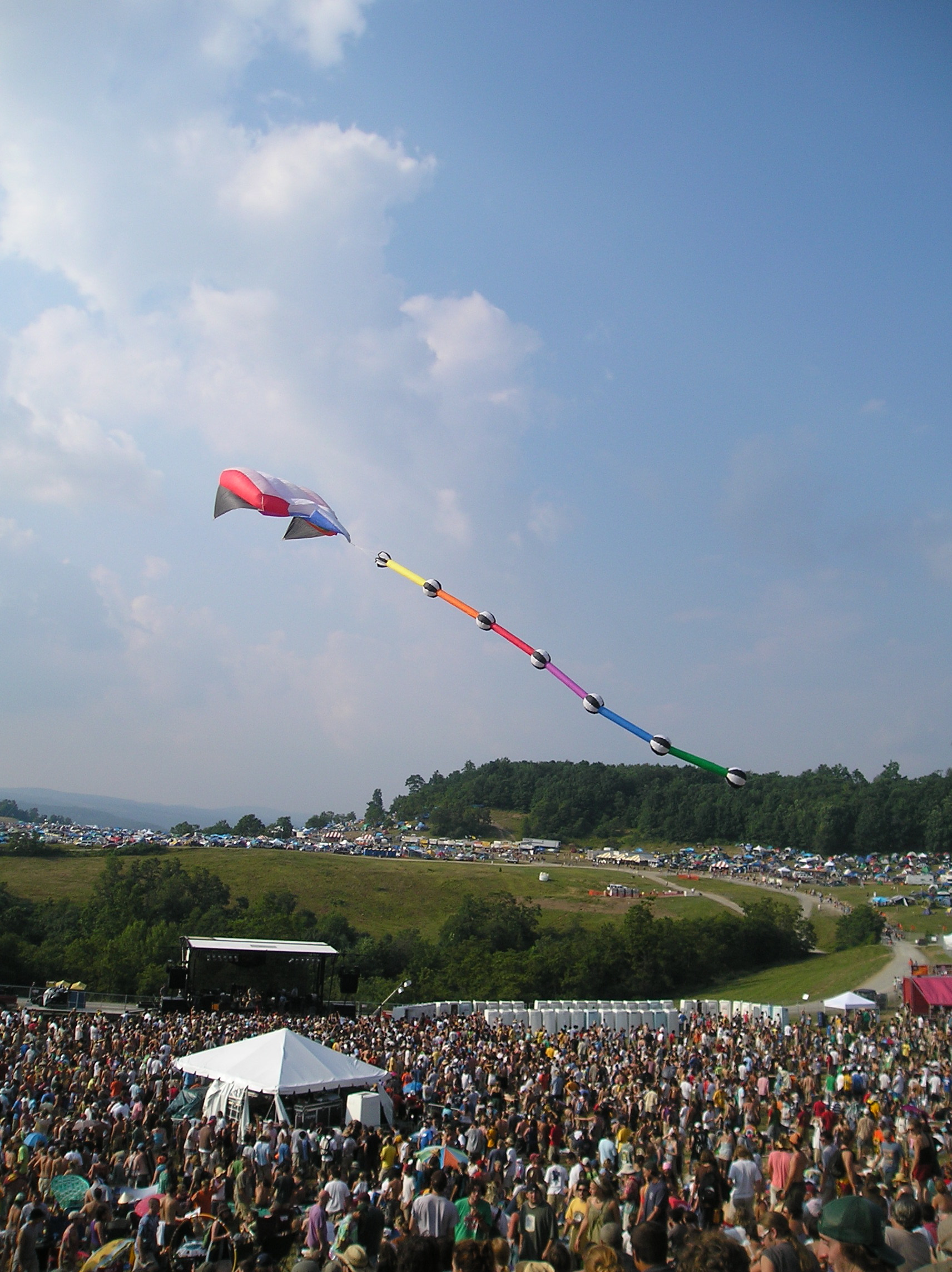
Kite flying at All Good.

The festival generally featured three performance spaces: the main stage, flanked by a smaller stage, and the Grassroots stage located by Shakedown Street. The two main stages in the concert area operated with no overlapping sets, allowing festival-goers the unique opportunity to see all of the music scheduled at the festival. The location of the main stage at the bottom of a hill created a natural amphitheater with the music from the stage projected to the maximum number of listeners sitting on the hill; the mountains of West Virginia serving as backdrop.

== Legal action ==
A Virginia driver, Clay Lewin, crashed into a tent of sleeping women at the West Virginia festival site near Masontown in July 2011. Nicole Miller, 20, of South Carolina, died in the accident, with two friends severely injured—Yen Ton and Elizabeth Doran, both of Mount Pleasant, South Carolina. Lewin, of Cape Charles, Virginia, lost control of his pickup but blames parking and security agents who guided him to the "steep, grassy slope near tents and other vehicles."

Lewin, Ton, Doran, and Kim Miller sued campground operator Marvin’s Mountaintop LLC; Walther Productions; California-based Tobin Productions; M&M Parking Inc. of Pennsylvania; and three security providers, Event Staffing Inc. of Virginia, National Event Services, Inc., of New Hampshire, and Axis Security Inc. of Tennessee. Some principals were sued as individuals; all denied culpability, filing counterclaims against each other.

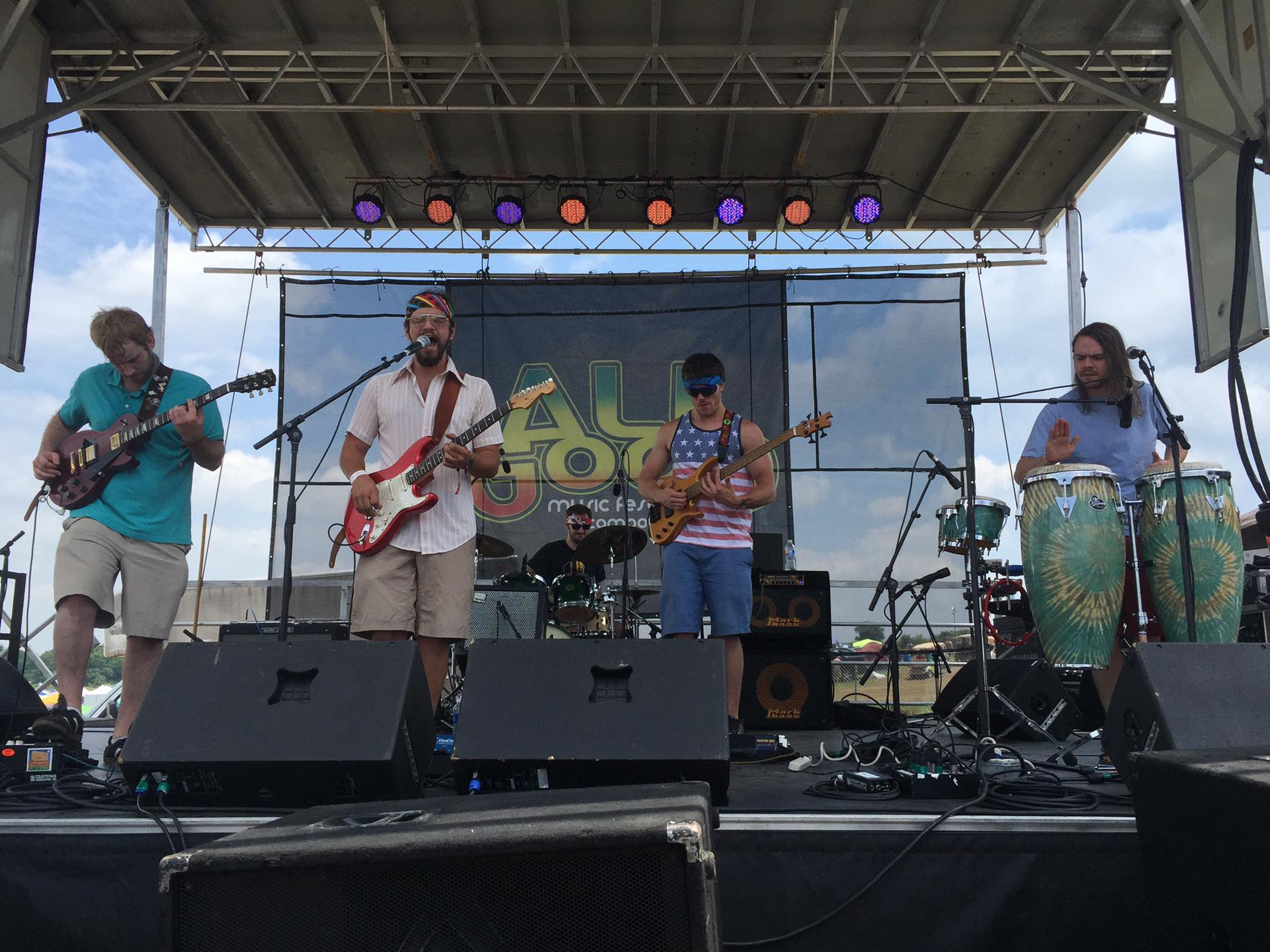
Fletcher's Grove performing at All Good 2015 (photo by Anthony Paitsel)

== Locations ==
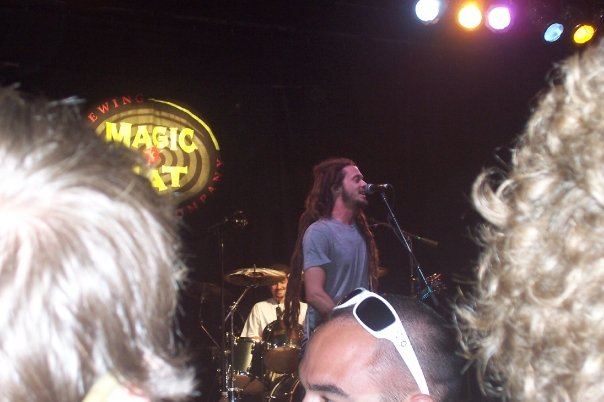
Jacob Hemphill of Soldier of Jah Army plays 2008 late night.

On October 13, 2011, Tim Walther sent a request to Caroline County, VA, to ask for a change in a music ordinance. He wanted to move the annual show from West Virginia to Moss Neck Manor, a 1,200-acre site in Port Royal, VA, off U.S. 17 owned by the Silver Cos. The festival would feature 14 to 16 hours of music a day, twice as much as the county allows.

- 2015 - Berry Hill Farm - Summit Point, West Virginia: July 9–11
- 2013 - Legend Valley - Thornville, Ohio: July 18–21
- 2012 - Legend Valley - Thornville, Ohio: July 19–22
- 2011 - Marvin's Mountaintop - Masontown, WV: July 14–17
- 2010 - Marvin's Mountaintop - Masontown, WV: July 8–11
- 2009 - Marvin's Mountaintop - Masontown, WV
- 2008 - Marvin's Mountaintop - Masontown, WV
- 2007 - Marvin's Mountaintop - Masontown, WV
- 2006 - Marvin's Mountaintop - Masontown, WV
- 2005 - Marvin's Mountaintop - Masontown, WV
- 2004 - Marvin's Mountaintop - Masontown, WV
- 2003 - Marvin's Mountaintop - Masontown, WV
- 2002 - Sunshine Daydream Campground - Terra Alta, WV
- 2001 - Oakley Farm - Spotsylvania, VA
- 2000 - Buffalo Gap Campground - Capon Bridge, WV
- 1999 - Wilmers Park - Brandywine, MD
- 1998 - Wilmers Park - Brandywine, MD
- 1997 - Wilmers Park - Brandywine, MD

== Line-up by year ==
2012: The Allman Brothers Band, Phil Lesh & Friends, Michael Franti & Spearhead, Yonder Mountain String Band, Dark Star Orchestra and . .
- The Allman Brothers Band
- Phil Lesh & Friends
- The Flaming Lips
- Bob Weir & Bruce Hornsby featuring Branford Marsalis
- Michael Franti & Spearhead
- Yonder Mountain String Band
- Lotus
- Dark Star Orchestra
- G. Love & Special Sauce
- Big Gigantic
- Galactic
- Shpongle
- Mickey Hart Band
- Trampled by Turtles
- SOJA
- Railroad Earth
- Papadosio
- The Werks
- Tea Leaf Green
- Conspirator
- Greensky Bluegrass
- The Wood Brothers
- Lettuce
- ALO
- Larry Keel & Natural Bridge
- Jerry Joseph & The Jackmormons
- Passafire
- Devil Makes Three
- Corey Harris & The Rasta Blues Experience
- Rubblebucket
- Elephant Revival
- The Lumineers
- The Pimps of Joytime
- Red Wanting Blue
- Everyone Orchestra
- The Macpodz
- Dirtfoot
- Moon Hooch
- Yellow Dubmarine
- Cris Jacobs Band
- Rumpke Mountain Boys
- The 4onthefloor
- The Rex Jam
- DJ Who
2011: The Infamous Stringdusters, Keller Williams, Furthur (featuring Phil Lesh & Bob Weir), Primus, Karl Denson's Tiny Universe and . .

Thursday July 14

- Hot Buttered Rum
- Beats Antique
- John Butler Trio
- STS9 (LateNight)

Friday July 15

- The Recipe (Grassroots Stage)
- Dangermuffin (Grassroots Stage)
- Giant Panda Guerilla Dub Squad
- The Infamous Stringdusters
- That 1 Guy
- Galactic
- Everyone Orchestra
- Keller Williams
- Dana Fuchs
- Warren Haynes Band
- Toubab Krewe
- Furthur (featuring Phil Lesh & Bob Weir) (Headliner)
- Big Gigantic (LateNight)
- Umphrey's McGee (LateNight)

Saturday July 16

- Fletcher's Grove (Grassroots Stage)
- Lubriphonic (Grassroots Stage)
- Zach Deputy
- The Werks
- Donna the Buffalo
- Marco Benevento
- JJ Grey & MOFRO
- J Roddy Walston and the Business
- Rebelution
- The Rex Jam
- Yonder Mountain String Band
- Orgone
- moe.
- Papadosio
- Primus (Headliner)
- Karl Denson's Tiny Universe (LateNight)
- Pretty Lights (LateNight)

Sunday July 17

- All Mighty Senators
- Greensky Bluegrass
- These United States
- Toots and the Maytals
- The Bridge
- Dark Star Orchestra

2010: Dark Star Orchestra, Old Crow Medicine Show, Furthur (featuring Phil Lesh & Bob Weir), Railroad Earth, George Clinton & Parliament Funkadelic and . .

Thursday July 8

- Donna Jean Godchaux Band w Jeff Mattson
- Fort Knox Five
- Dark Star Orchestra
- The New Deal (LateNight)

Friday July 9

- Greensky Bluegrass (Grassroots Stage)
- Giant Panda Guerilla Dub Squad (Grassroots Stage)
- The Bridge
- Justin Jones
- Tea Leaf Green
- The Pimps of Joytime
- Femi Kuti & the Positive Force
- Everyone Orchestra
- Old Crow Medicine Show
- Dr. Didg
- Umphrey's McGee
- Cornmeal
- Furthur (Featuring Phil Lesh & Bob Weir) (Headliner)
- Bassnectar (LateNight)
- Lotus (LateNight)

Saturday July 10

- The Brew (Grassroots Stage)
- Rubblebucket (Grassroots Stage)
- The Macpodz
- Rebelution
- Dr. Dog
- Papadosio
- Railroad Earth
- George Clinton & Parliament Funkadelic
- Perpetual Groove
- Derek Trucks & Susan Tedeschi Band
- The New Mastersounds
- Widespread Panic (Headliner)
- Garage A Trois (LateNight)
- Yonder Mountain String Band (LateNight)

Sunday July 11

- Keller Williams & The Keels
- The Lee Boys
- The Travelin' McCourys
- The Heavy Pets
- SOJA
- Grace Potter and the Nocturnals
- Keller Williams & the Added Bonus

2009: Keller Williams, Yonder Mountain String Band, Lake Trout, Umphrey's McGee, Les Claypool, Bob Weir & Ratdog and . .

Thursday July 9

- Seepeoples
- BoomBox
- Keller Williams
- Lotus (LateNight)

Friday July 10

- Hill Country Revue
- Jackie Greene
- That 1 Guy
- Galactic
- Robert Randolph & The Family Band
- Todd Snider
- Les Claypool
- The New Mastersounds
- Bob Weir & Ratdog (Headliner)
- Bassnectar
- moe. (LateNight)

Saturday July 11

- Fear Nuttin' Band
- Cornmeal
- The Bridge
- Steve Kimock & Crazy Engine
- Jeff Austin & Brendan Bayliss
- Buckethead
- Assembly of Dust
- Yonder Mountain String Band
- Lake Trout
- STS9
- Ivan Neville's Dumpstaphunk
- Ben Harper & Relentless7 (Headliner)
- SOJA
- Umphrey's McGee (LateNight)

Sunday July 12

- Trombone Shorty & Orleans Avenue
- Donna The Buffalo
- Tea Leaf Green
- BK3
- Dark Star Orchestra

2008: The Avett Brothers, Reverend Peyton's Big Damn Band, Grace Potter and the Nocturnals, Phil Lesh and Friends, Gov't Mule and . .

Thursday July 10

- Jazzam
- Perpetual Groove
- Brazilian Girls
- The Join featuring Jamie Shields & Darren Shearer from The New Deal (band) w/ The Benevento/Russo Duo (LateNight)

Friday July 11

- The Wood Brothers
- MJ Project
- RAQ
- Basshound
- The Avett Brothers
- Reverend Peyton's Big Damn Band
- Grace Potter and the Nocturnals
- All Mighty Senators
- Medeski, Scofield, Martin & Wood
- Lettuce
- Phil Lesh and Friends (Headliner)
- SOJA
- Gov't Mule (LateNight)

Saturday July 12

- Eric Lindell
- Outformation
- Hot Buttered Rum
- Rex Jam
- Tea Leaf Green
- Scrapomatic
- Mike Gordon
- Telepath (band)
- Derek Trucks & Susan Tedeschi Soul Stew Revival
- Pnuma Trio
- Keller Williams w/ Keith Moseley, Gibb Droll & Jeff Sipe
- Bassnectar
- Widespread Panic (Headliner)
- The Bridge
- Dark Star Orchestra (LateNight)

Sunday July 13

- Bonerama
- JJ Grey & MOFRO
- deSol
- Railroad Earth
- Danielia Cotton
- Michael Franti & Spearhead

2007: Leftover Salmon, Keller Williams and the Keels, Michael Franti and Spearhead, Les Claypool, Yonder Mountain String Band, Drive-By Truckers and . .

- Bob Weir & RatDog
- moe.
- Leftover Salmon
- Keller Williams and the Keels
- Michael Franti and Spearhead
- Les Claypool
- Yonder Mountain String Band
- Drive-By Truckers
- Sound Tribe Sector 9
- Steel Pulse
- Soulive w/ Toussaint
- Lotus
- Tea Leaf Green
- Grace Potter and the Nocturnals
- Benevento/Russo Duo
- Sam Bush
- Dark Star Orchestra
- The Slip
- Perpetual Groove
- Assembly of Dust
- Porter, Batiste, Stoltz
- Ozric Tentacles
- The Pietasters
- The Bridge
- Bob Schneider
- SOJA
- New Monsoon
- Will Hoge
- Ryan Montbleau Band
- Benzos
- The Lee Boys
- West Indian Girl
- Lovewhip
- American Dumpster

2006: Trey Anastasio, Disco Biscuits, Les Claypool, Southern Culture on the Skids, Umphrey's Mcgee, Railroad Earth, Tea Leaf Green and . .

- Trey Anastasio & Mike Gordon w/Benevento/Russo Duo
- Disco Biscuits
- Ween
- Les Claypool
- John Medeski and The Itch
- Southern Culture on the Skids
- Bob Schneider
- Oteil and the Peacemakers
- The Bridge
- Steel Train
- Stephen Kellogg and the Sixers
- SOJA
- The Brakes
- The Black Crowes
- Robert Randolph & the Family Band
- Umphrey's Mcgee
- The Greyboy Allstars
- Galactic
- Donavon Frankenreiter
- Railroad Earth
- Tea Leaf Green
- RAQ
- The Hackensaw Boys
- Danielia Cotton
- Animal Liberation Orchestra
- Grace Potter and the Nocturnals
- Gary Jules
- The Wailers
- Aquarium Rescue Unit
- Xavier Rudd
- Rebirth Brass Band
- Mofro
- Hot Buttered Rum (band)
- Thursday Night Early Bird:
- The Boogie Hustlers
- Brothers Past
- Easy Star All-Stars

2005: Lake Trout, Del McCoury Band, Dark Star Orchestra, Keller Williams, The String Cheese Incident, Yonder Mountain String Band and . .

Thursday, July 14

- Matisyahu

Friday, July 15

- The Flaming Lips
- Particle
- Les Claypool
- Gabby La La
- Jason Isbell
- Rose Hill Drive
- Lake Trout
- John Brown's Body
- Brother's Past

Saturday, July 16

- The String Cheese Incident
- Umphrey's McGee
- Michael Franti & Spearhead
- Keller Williams
- Yonder Mountain String Band
- Ozomatli
- Carbon Leaf
- Lotus
- New Monsoon

Sunday, July 17

- Dark Star Orchestra
- Steve Kimock
- Victor Wooten
- Benevento/Russo Duo
- Ivan Neville's Dumpstaphunk

2004: Leftover Salmon, Del McCoury Band, Dark Star Orchestra, Keller Williams, The Hackensaw Boys and . .

Thursday, July 8

- The Recipe
- Jah Works

Friday, July 9

- Ozric Tentacles
- Keller Williams
- Theresa Anderson
- The Greyboy Allstars
- Stockholm Syndrome
- Steve Kimock Band
- Deep Fried
- The Assembly of Dust

Saturday, July 10

- The Disco Biscuits
- T.E.R.A (Seishi/Brantigan)
- Medeski Martin & Wood
- Libby Kirkpatrick
- Leftover Salmon (w/ David Lowery & Johnny Hickman of Cracker)
- David Lowery & Johnny Hickmann
- Burning Spear
- Ekoostik Hookah
- Soulive
- Umphrey's McGee
- Jazz Mandolin Project w/ Jon Fishman
- The Hackensaw Boys
- The Bridge

Sunday, July 11

- Dark Star Orchestra
- Jeff Austin (of YMSB)
- North Mississippi Allstars (w/ John Medeski)
- Del McCoury Band
- Campbell Brothers

2003: Leftover Salmon, Acoustic Syndicate, Dark Star Orchestra, Keller Williams, Karl Denson's Tiny Universe and . .

Thursday, May 15

- Dark Star Orchestra

Friday, May 16

- Galactic
- Keller Williams
- North Mississippi Allstars
- All Mighty Senators
- Acoustic Syndicate
- Mofro
- Seth Yacavone Band

Saturday, May 17

- Gov't Mule
- Karl Denson's Tiny Universe
- Leftover Salmon
- Big Mountain
- The Recipe
- Jazz Mandolin Project
- Umphrey's McGee
- Carbon Leaf
- Liz Berlin & Jenn Wertz (of Rusted Root)

Tweener sets

- DJ Logic
- Joules Graves

Late Night sets

- Reid Genauer & the Assembly of Dust
- The Slip

2002: Leftover Salmon, Sam Bush Band, Dark Star Orchestra, Keller Williams, Railroad Earth and . .

Thursday, May 16

- The Bomb Squad
- ulu
- OM Trio
- Ordinary Way

Friday, May 17

- Dark Star Orchestra
- Sam Bush Band
- Vinyl
- Entrain
- Townhall
- All Mighty Senators (late night)

Saturday, May 18

- moe.
- Leftover Salmon
- Keller Williams
- John Scofield Band
- Railroad Earth
- Jah Works
- Dr. Didg (late night)

2001: Leftover Salmon, Lake Trout, Dark Star Orchestra, Karl Denson's Tiny Universe, Donna the Buffalo and . .

Friday, May 18

- Dark Star Orchestra
- Karl Denson's Tiny Universe
- Blueground Undergrass
- John Brown's Body
- McLaw's Drive

Saturday, May 19

- Leftover Salmon
- The Recipe
- Lake Trout
- Keller Williams
- Donna the Buffalo
- Dr. Didg
- The Slip
- ulu
- Swampadelica
- Railroad Earth

2000: Leftover Salmon, Lake Trout, Acoustic Syndicate, Yonder Mountain String Band and . .

Friday, May 19

- Leftover Salmon
- The Recipe
- Lake Trout
- Acoustic Syndicate
- The Floodplain Gang
- Yonder Mountain String Band

Saturday, May 20

- moe.
- The Disco Biscuits
- All Mighty Senators
- Soulive
- Blueground Undergrass
- Dr. Didg
- Wise Monkey Orchestra
- Baaba Seth

1999: String Cheese Incident, Tony Trischka Band, Karl Denson's Tiny Universe, and . .

Friday, May 21

- String Cheese Incident
- The Recipe
- ekoostik hookah
- Tony Trischka Band
- Runaway Truck Ramp
- ulu

Saturday, May 22

- moe.
- Karl Denson's Tiny Universe
- Lake Trout (canceled)
- The Disco Biscuits (canceled)
- Deep Banana Blackout
- All Mighty Senators
- Viperhouse
- The Slip
- Calobo
- Sector 9

== See also ==
- List of jam band music festivals
