= New Deal (disambiguation) =

The New Deal was Franklin D. Roosevelt's legislative agenda for rescuing the United States from the Great Depression.

New Deal may also refer to:

== Entertainment ==
- The New Deal (album)
- The New Deal (band)
- "The New Deal" (Agents of S.H.I.E.L.D.), a 2020 television episode
- "The New Deal" (Ready or Not), a 1994 television episode
- "The New Deal" (The Vampire Diaries), a 2012 television episode
- "A New Deal", a 2022 episode of television series The Walking Dead

== Places ==
- New Deal, Tennessee, a census designated place
- New Deal, Texas, a small town near Lubbock

== Politics ==
=== Policies ===
- A Green New Deal, a report released in the United Kingdom in 2008 that outlines a series of policy proposals to tackle global warming, financial crisis, and peak oil
- Green New Deal, a proposed United States legislative package to address climate-change and environmental sustainability
- Indian New Deal, a 1930s U.S. government policy on Native Americans
- New Deal for Aborigines, a 1930s Australian government policy on Indigenous Australians
- New Deal for Communities, a United Kingdom government program focused on urban renewal
- New Deal for Country Passengers, an Australian passenger rail reform program
- New Deal (United Kingdom), a program of United Kingdom government policies focused on unemployment

=== Political parties and groups ===
- New Deal (British political party), a political party in the United Kingdom
- New Deal (French political party), a political party in France
- New Deal coalition, a collection of political interest groups

== Other ==
- NewDeal, a software company
