= Look Who It Is =

Look Who It Is may refer to:

- "Look Who It Is" (song), a 1963 song by Helen Shapiro
- "Look Who It Is", a 2002 song by Lake Trout (band) from the album Another One Lost
- Look Who It Is! (book), a 2008 autobiography by Alan Carr

== See also ==
- "Well, Look Who It Is!", a 2024 episode of the web series Battle for Dream Island
