= List of jam band music festivals =

List of jam band festivals
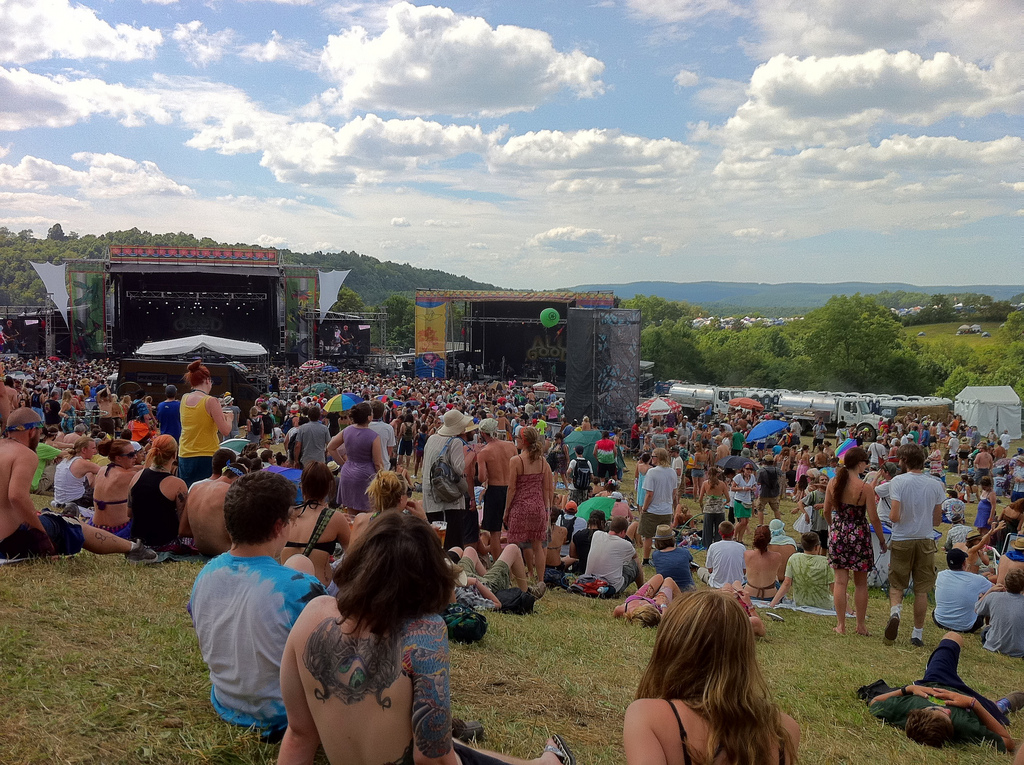

General Information
- Related genres: Psychedelic rock, electronic, folk rock, blues rock, jazz fusion, southern rock, progressive rock, acid jazz, hip hop, reggae, ska, rocksteady, garage rock, hard rock, heavy metal, punk rock, grunge, and bluegrass
- Location: United States (origin), worldwide
- Related events: Category:Jam band festivals, list of music festivals, free festival, rock festival, electronic music festival
- Related topics: Deadhead, hippie

This is a list of jam band music festivals. This list may have some overlap with list of historic rock festivals and list of reggae festivals. Jam bands are musical groups who relate to a unique fan culture that began in the 1960s with Grateful Dead (see deadheads), and continued with The Allman Brothers Band, which had lengthy jams at concerts. The performances of these bands typically feature extended musical improvisation ("jams") over rhythmic grooves and chord patterns, and long sets of music that can often cross genre boundaries.

While the seminal group Grateful Dead are categorized as psychedelic rock, by the 1990s the term "jam band" was being used for groups playing a variety of rock-related genres, and jam band festival lineups could include blues, country music, folk music, and funk. Today the term even includes some groups completely outside rock, such as those playing world music, electronic music, progressive bluegrass, and jazz fusion. A unique feature of the jam band scene is bands allowing fan taping or digital recording of live concerts.

== List of festivals ==
=== United States ===
Festival name	City/venue	State	Debut	Notes
10,000 Lakes Festival	Detroit Lakes	Minnesota	2003	Defunct
All Good Music Festival	Thornville	Ohio	1997	Defunct
Bonnaroo Music Festival	Manchester	Tennessee	2002	Initially founded as a jam band festival, but has expanded to other genres since
Camp Bisco	Scranton	Pennsylvania	1999	
Finger Lakes GrassRoots Festival of Music and Dance	Trumansburg	New York	1991	
Gathering of the Vibes	Bridgeport	Connecticut	1996	Defunct
Grateville Dead Fest	Louisville	Kentucky	2015	
Hangout Music Festival	Gulf Shores	Alabama	2010	
High Sierra Music Festival	Quincy	California	1991	
Hookahville	Kirkersville	Ohio	1994	
Langerado	Fort Lauderdale	Florida	2003	Defunct
Lockn' Festival	Arrington	Virginia	2013	
moe.down	Turin	New York	2000	
Mountain Jam	Hunter Mountain	New York	2004	
The Peach Music Festival	Scranton	Pennsylvania	2012	
Rothbury Music Festival	Rothbury	Michigan	2008	
Schwagstock	Shannon County	Missouri	1992	Defunct
Summer Camp Music Festival	Chillicothe	Illinois	2001	
Summer Jam at Watkins Glen	Watkins Glen	New York	1973	One-off event
Summer Meltdown	Darrington	Washington	2000	
Telluride Bluegrass Festival	Telluride	Colorado	1973	
Vegoose	Las Vegas	Nevada	2005	Defunct
Wakarusa Music and Camping Festival	Ozark	Arkansas	2004	Defunct
Wanee Festival	Live Oak	Florida	2005	

== See also ==
Related lists

- List of free festivals
- List of historic rock festivals
- List of jam bands
- List of jazz festivals
- List of music festivals

Related categories

- Category:Jam band festivals
- Category:Jazz festivals
- Category:Music festivals
- Category:Reggae festivals
- Category:World music festivals
