= Studiocat =

StudioCat is a Toronto-based company that specializes in creating original music for television, film and web.

Jamie Shields, from the Toronto group the New Deal (band) and Adam White, have been composing under the moniker StudioCat since 2004. In 2007, Adam and Jamie began collaborating extensively with composer and vocalist David Wall.

StudioCat are currently represented by Core Music Agency.
