= PPPP =

PPPP may refer to:

- Pigeons Playing Ping Pong, American jam band
- Pakistan Peoples Party Parliamentarians, Pakistani political party
- Polish Beer-Lovers' Party (Polish: Polska Partia Przyjaciół Piwa), defunct satirical political party
