= The Bridge (band) =

- Origin: Baltimore, Maryland, United States
- Genres: Jam band, rock, blues
- Years active: 2001-2011
- Members: Cris Jacobs, Kenny Liner, Dave Markowitz, Patrick Rainey, Mike Gambone, Mark Brown

The Bridge is an American jam band. They are based in Baltimore, Maryland and formed between 2001 and 2002. The band is known for their live performances, blending various elements of blues, folk, funk and bluegrass.

== The Band ==
The Bridge consists of Cris Jacobs on guitar and vocals, Kenny Liner on mandolin and vocals, Dave Markowitz on bass guitar and vocals, Patrick Rainey on the saxophone, Mike Gambone on drums, and Mark Brown on keyboards. The band has developed a strong following in the Maryland/Washington D.C. area, and as of Fall 2008 have toured much of the United States and parts of western Europe. They were awarded Baltimore's 'Best Band' and 'Best Album' by the Baltimore City Paper reader's poll in 2005. In 2008, they won the Jam Cruise 6 'vote to the boat' contest, earning a spot to play on the annual jam band cruise.

In 2002, they were briefly featured on the television show The Wire which is set in their hometown of Baltimore, Maryland.

The original line-up of the band consisted of Paul Weinberg on drums and Ryan Porter on bass. Porter and Jacobs went to high school together, where they were in a band called Big Fat. Markowitz and Weinberg were also in a high school band together named Black Eyed Susan.

On May 26, 2011, The Bridge announced they would be breaking up after their last live show, Thanksgiving Eve 2011.

On April 18, 2012, The Bridge announced they would be reuniting for one night at the 2012 All Good music festival.

== Discography ==
=== Albums ===
- Cross Street Market (2004)
- The Bridge (2006)
- Blind Man's Hill (2008)
- National Bohemian (2011)
