= Grateville Dead Fest =

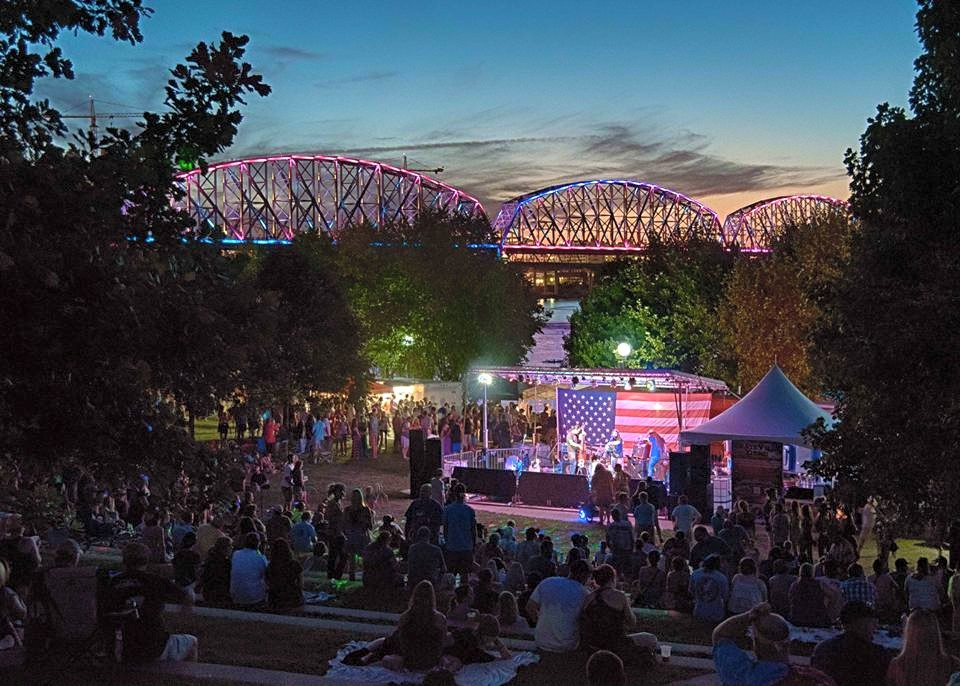
- Genre: Variety
- Locations: Louisville Waterfront Park; Louisville, Kentucky
- Years active: 2015–19, 2021–
- Founders: Dennie Humphrey and Ashley Angel
- Website: www.grateville.com

Grateville Dead Fest is an outdoor music and arts festival in Louisville, Kentucky catering to fans of the band Grateful Dead at the Brown Forman Amphitheater in Waterfront Park, overlooking the scenic Ohio River and boat docks. The festival typically includes two-to three days of jam band music by regional artists from the Kentucky, Tennessee and Ohio areas. The venue includes food and beverage vendors, folk art vendors, local breweries and typically supports some cause each year to which a portion of the proceeds are donated. The event also supports the Waterfront Development Corporation and City of Louisville.

== History ==
In 2015 local Louisville entrepreneur and producer Dennie Humphrey and co-founder Ashley Angel produced the very first Grateville Dead Tribute in honor of the late Jerry Garcia and the Grateful Dead on Garcia's birthday August 1. After leaving Abbey Road on the River several weeks before when Ashley said, "Why isn't there a Grateful Dead on the River?" prompting Humphrey, who also co-founded the GonzoFest music festival at Waterfront Park and had experience putting the events together.

Including talents like Tyrone Cotton, Hyryder, Hot Iron Skillet, Vessel, Born Cross-Eyed and the Louisville Merry Pranksters, the event became a success, drawing a large crowd of over 2,000 people its first year to the Brown Forman Amphitheater despite a very small advertising campaign and little planning. From conception to opening day was only thirty days and the organizers didn't expect a large turnout. The event gained local notability and the founders have continued the event annually including the addition of "halfstep" shows consisting of a smaller show in the winter to promote and announce the summer festival dates.

The event returned in 2016, 2017, and again in 2018. In 2017 organizers included the addition of all-night camping for festival goers.

The festival was on hiatus in 2020 caused by the COVID-19 pandemic. It returns in 2021.
