= Lotus (American band) =

American instrumental electronic jam band

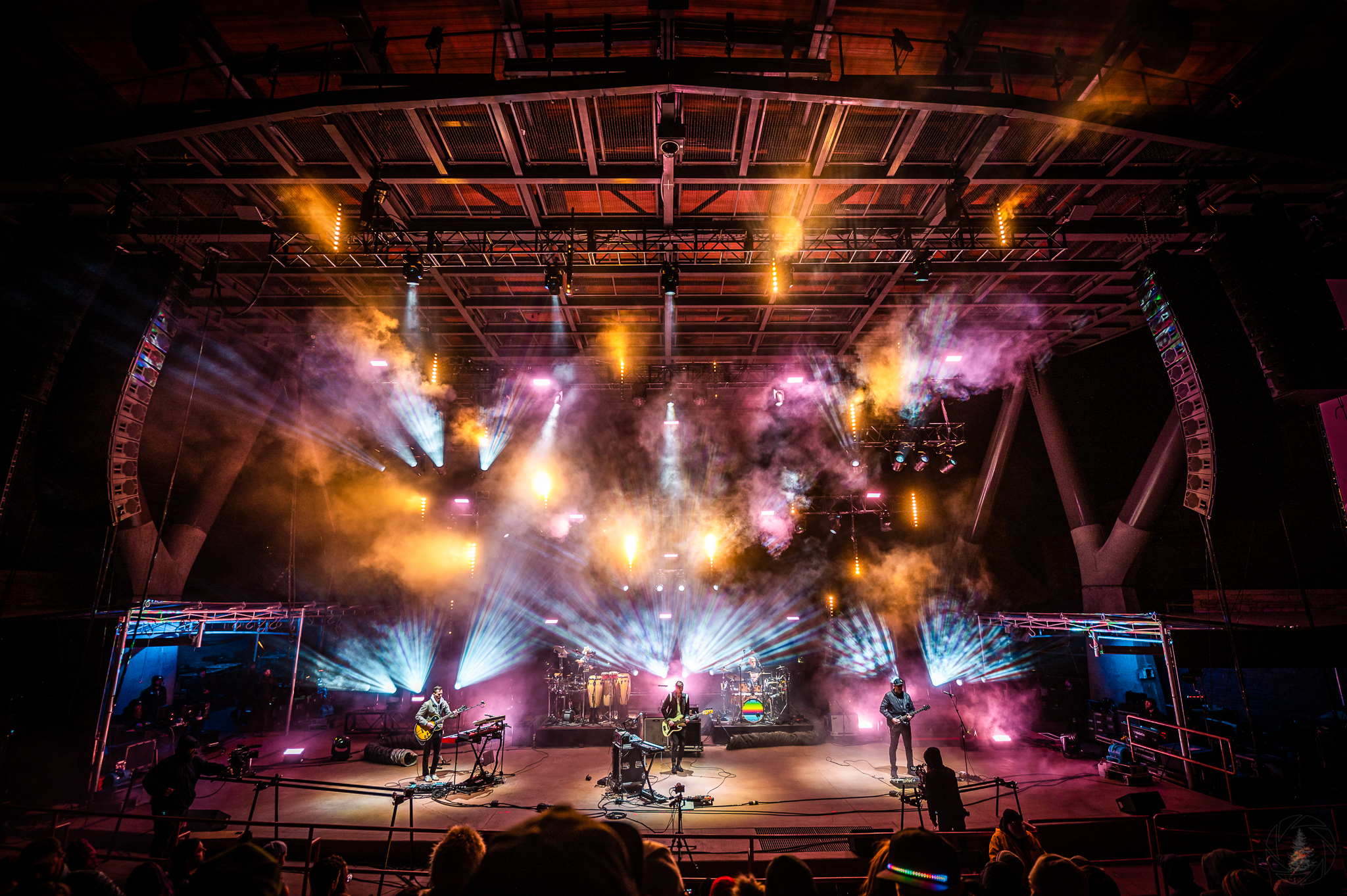
- Lotus performing at Red Rocks in 2022

Background information
- Origin: Indiana, United States
- Genres: Jam band; Electronic; Livetronica
- Years active: 1999–present
- Labels: Sci Fidelity; Anti-Fragile
- Members: Luke Miller; Jesse Miller; Mike Greenfield; Tim Palmieri
- Past members: Chuck Morris; Michael Rempel; Steve Clemens; Joel Jimenez; Andy Parada
- Website: lotusvibes.com

Lotus is an instrumental electronic jam band formed in Goshen, Indiana in 1998 now based in Philadelphia, Pennsylvania, and Denver, Colorado.

== History ==
Lotus was formed at Goshen College in August 1998 by Steve Clemens, Luke Miller, Michael Rempel, Andy Parada, and Joel Jimenez, with the first live show occurring on September 25, 1998. The band's more permanent lineup coalesced in 1999. After a few years of playing what they describe as "jamtronica", Lotus recruited percussionist Chuck Morris in 2001 and shifted their focus to instrumental music, taking inspiration from electronic musicians such as The Orb. The band's first album, Vibes, a compilation of live performances from their 2001 tour, was released in 2002, after which they signed to Harmonized Records, releasing a live album and two studio albums between 2003 and 2006. 2004's Nomad went to the top of the Home Grown Music Network charts and by the end of the year was the HGMN Best Seller. It was also nominated for a "New Groove of the Year" Jammy award. The album saw the band described by AllMusic as "an electronically inclined jazz-funk outfit", with Glide magazine stating "Nomad exhibits Lotus' tight ability to blend shades of organic groove with elements of urban house". The band's last album on Harmonized, The Strength of Weak Ties was described by PopMatters as "instrumentals that - for the most part - don't go anywhere, but occasionally pulling out something that is genuinely thrilling". The band then signed to SCI Fidelity Records, debuting on the label with the live double album, Escaping Sargasso Sea, which was nominated for a Jammy award by Guitar Player magazine for "Best Live Album of 2007". The album was described by Relix magazine as "sexy and sophisticated dance music, mature enough to be played in the club or the living room". The band followed this with Copy/Paste/Repeat, an album of remixes of tracks from their previous two studio albums, by bands and producers including Lymbyc Systym, Juan Maclean, DJ Harry and Telepath. The album was positively received by PopMatters, who said "Copy/Paste/Repeat reinvents the jam band’s music as dance floor jams, with hip-hop and trance-influenced beats and mind-warping electronic synth burbles".

The album, Hammerstrike was released on SCI Fidelity in 2008 to positive reviews. The band followed the album's release with a forty seven-date North American tour. On Oct. 6, 2009 Lotus released a set of 2 EPs titled Oil on Glass/Feather on Wood featuring music recorded during the Hammerstrike sessions and 3 remixes of tracks from Hammerstrike. Before the band's 2009 fall tour, original drummer Steve Clemens left the band and was replaced by current drummer Mike Greenfield. The loss of Clemens triggered a gradual departure from the band's improvisational roots and a stylistic shift from organic electronica and jazz/funk fusion to electro-pop, indie rock and hip-hop.

The album Lotus was released on Sept. 13, 2011. The band recorded the album between December 2009 and October 2010 with Bill Moriarty in Philadelphia, with additional recordings made in the home studios of Jesse and Luke Miller and at various locations around the country. David Wrench mixed a number of the tracks, and a few tracks were mixed by Bill Moriarty, along with Jesse Miller and Luke Miller. The band released its first music video for "Golden Ghost" in August 2011 directed by Brent Kado.

In addition to touring, Lotus headlines the Summerdance music festival at Nelson Ledges Quarry Park in Garrettsville, Ohio. The festival has been held since 2008. In 2021, following the COVID-19 pandemic, Rempel left the group to focus on a wellness career. He was replaced by Tim Palmieri, who is known for his work in The Breakfast and Kung fu.

The band announced the release of a new album, Bloom & Recede, which was released on August 26, 2022.

Chuck Morris and his son Charley were reported as missing in March 2023 after they disappeared while kayaking on Beaver Lake in Arkansas. An extensive search effort was undertaken to find the Morrises, which was converted into a recovery effort on March 21. The bodies of Chuck and Charley Morris were discovered on April 9, 2023.

== Live shows ==
Lotus is known for concerts with a complex light setup, and varying set lists that employ frequent group improvisation. Live concert recordings are collected on the site Nugs.net. The band has undertaken a number of tours and have performed at festivals including Jam on the River in Philadelphia (2007, 2008, 2014 and 2015), Wakarusa (2005, 2006, 2007), Rothbury Music Festival in July 2008, 2009, 2013 and 2015, and All Good Music & Arts Festival 2010 and 2012 The band played a concert in New York City in September 2008 in which the new album Hammerstrike was played in full. They also played at the Summer Camp Music Festival in Chillicothe, Illinois in 2008, 2009, 2011, 2012, 2014, 2016, and 2019. Other festivals include Outside Lands, Bonnaroo, Camp Bisco, Fuji Rock, and Ultra.

Lotus has toured in Japan six times, performing at clubs and festivals including Fuji Rock, Metamorphose and Green Room Festival.

The band has performed several themed shows. On October 31, 2008, at the TLA in Philadelphia, the show was billed as "Live Fast Die Young: the 27 Conspiracy". Each of the five members dressed as a rock star who died at the age of 27 (Kurt Cobain, Jimi Hendrix, Brian Jones, Ron “Pigpen” McKernan, and Jim Morrison) and the show featured covers by each of the respective bands. On December 31, 2008, the band performed a show that included robot themed covers including "Mr. Roboto" (Styx), "I Robot" (The Alan Parsons Project), "Yoshimi Battles the Pink Robots, Pt. 1" (The Flaming Lips), "Paranoid Android" (Radiohead), and "Robot Rock" (Daft Punk). On October 31, 2009, at Sonar in Baltimore, the Halloween show was presented as "Protein Pills in the Labyrinth". The band members dressed as different David Bowie characters (including Ziggy Stardust, The Thin White Duke, and Jareth) and played "Under Pressure", "Fame", "I'm Afraid of Americans", "Space Oddity", "Let's Dance", "Rebel, Rebel" and "Suffragette City", along with original Lotus material. These David Bowie songs have occasionally appeared thereafter during the rest of the Fall 2009 tour. On February 22, 2010, at Schuba's in Chicago, the band's first of two sets focused on post-rock music featuring covers of Tortoise, Trans Am and This Will Destroy You along with Lotus's own post-rock compositions. On October 30, 2010, at the Roseland in Portland, Oregon, the band performed a Black Sabbath themed show. For the second set the band came on stage dressed as Black Sabbath and performed remixed versions of side A of the album Paranoid (“War Pigs”, “Paranoid”, “Planet Caravan”, and “Iron Man”), celebrating 40 years since its release. On October 31, 2010, at the Showbox in Seattle, the band paid tribute to video game music. They performed remixes of classic video game music, including "Power Pills Remix" from Pac-Man, "Jungle Theme" from Contra, "Dr. Wily's Theme" from Mega Man 2, the Tetris theme, and the "Overworld" and "Underworld" themes from The Legend of Zelda. On December 31, 2011, at Festival Pier in Philadelphia, Lotus nodded to some of the modern dance producers covering "Da Funk" (Daft Punk), "Phantom Part II" (Justice) and "Ghosts 'n' Stuff" (DeadMau5). On October 29, 2016, at Town Ballroom in Buffalo, New York, the band played a space disco set. Jesse Miller used a Juno-106, Moog Minitaur and modular synth rack for the set focused on the space disco genre.

Lotus was featured on the cover of the tour industry's leading magazine in October 2008 Pollstar.

Lotus opened the Summer 2021 concert series at the Red Rocks Amphitheater in Morrison, Colorado, on April 22, 2021. Their performance, the first of a four night series, marked the first major show at Red Rocks following the COVID-19 shutdown. Lotus has performed Summerdance every year since they created it at Nelson Ledges Quarry Park.

== Musical style ==
Expanding upon a wide range of styles and sounds, Lotus is considered a multi-genre band. The group incorporates elements of rock, electronica, jazz, jam, hip-hop, funk and other influences. The band originally played as a jamband that leaned heavily on the sounds of funk, rock and jazz and with improvisational styles similar to Phish, Allman Brothers and The Grateful Dead. Jesse Miller said of the band's sound: "I truly believe Lotus' sound comes from the roots of rock 'n' roll mixed with electronic beats that are popular today. It took a long time for us to finally find a sound we all agreed on. But believe me, we experimented plenty before deciding what sound we were looking for". Lotus has also been known to experiment with a diverse set of genres regularly incorporating hip-hop and dubstep sounds and samples into their live shows.

Influenced heavily by the band's love for dance music and artists like The Orb, Aphex Twin, Kraftwerk, Talking Heads, Brian Eno, and Air the band's style has gravitated toward elements of the electronic genre while maintaining the foundation of jamrock.

Since 2006, the band has fused elements of progressive and post rock into their sound. Artists such as Trans Am, Tortoise, Broken Social Scene and Beck have influenced Lotus.

Since 2020, the band has incorporated modular synth into their live show for composed and improvised, synth focused music.

== Members ==
Current members

- Luke Miller – guitar/keyboards (1998–present)
- Jesse Miller – bass and sampler and modular synth (1999–present)
- Mike Greenfield – drums (2009–present)
- Tim Palmieri – guitar (2021–present)

Past members

- Michael Rempel – guitar (1998–2003, 2003–2021)
- Steve Clemens – drums (1998–2009)
- Joel Jimenez – bass (1998–1999)
- Andy Parada – drums (1998)
- Chuck Morris – percussion (2001–2023)

Touring

- Dave Guevara – percussion (2000)
- Michael Christie – keyboards (2003)

== Discography ==
- Vibes (2002) self-released (out of print)
- Germination (live) (2003) Harmonized Records
- Nomad (2004) Harmonized Records
- The Strength of Weak Ties (2006) Harmonized Records
- Escaping Sargasso Sea (live) (2007) Sci Fidelity
- Copy/Paste/Repeat (remixes) (2007) Lotus Vibes Music
- Hammerstrike (2008) Sci Fidelity
- Oil on Glass/Feather on Wood EPs (2009) Sci Fidelity
- Lotus (2011) Sci Fidelity
- Build (2013) Sci Fidelity
- Monks (2013)
- Gilded Age (2014)
- Eat the Light (2016)
- Frames Per Second (2018)
- Free Swim (2020)
- Citrus (2021)
- Live Underground (2022)
- Bloom & Recede (2022) Anti-Fragile
- Live in Steel City (2023)
- How To Dream In Color (2024)
- Rise Of The Anglerfish (February 13, 2026)
