= The New Deal (album) =

Studio album by The New Deal
- Released: September 25, 2001
- Genre: Livetronica
- Length: 61:40
- Label: Zomba Records / BMG
- Producer: The New Deal

The New Deal chronology
Receiver (2001)	The New Deal (2001)	Gone Gone Gone (2003)

The New Deal is a live album released by the Canadian electronic music trio The New Deal in 2001. The bulk of the album was recorded at performances in Atlanta GA, Ithaca NY, Northampton MA, and Montreal QC, though it was sculpted into a larger piece in the studio.

The album was nominated for Alternative Album of the Year at the 2003 Juno Awards.

== Track listing ==
No.	Title	Length
1.	"Back to the Middle"	4:18
2.	"Receiver"	6:25
3.	"Exciting New Direction"	5:08
4.	"Self Orbit"	3:20
5.	"Intro (Deep Sun)"	0:53
6.	"Deep Sun"	7:06
7.	"Glide"	5:08
8.	"Talk Show"	6:01
9.	"Technobeam"	9:12
10.	"The Ray Parker Suite: Pt. 1"	2:37
11.	"The Ray Parker Suite: Pt. 2"	2:06
12.	"Then and Now"	9:26
Total length:		61:40
