= Acoustic Syndicate =

American roots-rock/Americana band

- Origin: North Carolina, United States
- Genres: Americana, Rock
- Years active: 1992–present
- Labels: Sugar Hill Records

Acoustic Syndicate is a roots-rock/Americana band from North Carolina that has been an active part of the rock music scene since forming in 1992. They have toured nationally in the US, including appearances at Farm Aid, Jazzfest, MerleFest, and the Bonnaroo Music Festival. Their sound is characterized by three-part vocal blood harmony and complex polyrhythmic banjo playing. Although they are known for featuring traditional acoustic instruments, Acoustic Syndicate's early influences in rock, jazz and reggae surface throughout their approach to songwriting with electric guitar, electric bass and saxophone instrumentation often appearing. Lyrically, the group often discusses themes relating to subsistence, sustainability, social justice and quality of life. Their live touring act is a popular draw to festivals, theaters, clubs, and performing arts centers.

The band consists of the McMurry family (brothers Bryon McMurry and Fitzhugh McMurry, along with their first cousin Steve McMurry), who come from a small family farm in Cleveland County, North Carolina, north of Shelby, North Carolina. They have been farming the same region that their ancestors settled over 200 years ago. Rounding out the quartet is long-time member, Jay Sanders, who currently resides in Asheville, NC, and is an active member of the local music scene.

Since 1996, the band has released six full-length albums, one double live album, and as of 2021, they recorded five new singles with current label, Organic Records. Recorded at Crossroads Studio in Arden, NC, the singles feature a mix of original songs and covers by influences The Grateful Dead, Willie Nelson, and The Velvet Underground.

== Members ==
=== Current members ===
- Bryon McMurry: Vocals, Banjo, Guitar
- Fitz McMurry: Vocals, Drums, Percussion
- Steve McMurry: Vocals, Guitar, Mandolin
- Jay Sanders: Bass, N/S Stick

=== Former members ===
- Billy Cardine: Dobro & Electric Resophonic Guitar
- Jeremy Saunders: Vocals, Saxophone
- John Burn: Percussion
- Doug Rodgers: Bass
- Roger Padgett: Guitar
- Gaines Post: Flute

== Discography and Singles ==
- Acoustic Syndicate (Self-released, 1996)
- Tributaries (Self-released, 1999)
- Crazy Little Life (Little King Records, 2000)
- Live From The Neighborhood (Little King Records, 2003)
- Terra Firma (Sugar Hill Records, 2003)
- Long Way Round (Sugar Hill Records, 2004)
- Rooftop Garden (Little King Records, 2013)
- Sunny (Organic Records, 2021)
- Bertha (Organic Records, 2021)
- Simple Dream (Organic Records, 2021)
- Angel Flying Too Close to the Ground (Organic Records, 2021)
- Rock n Roll (Organic Records, 2021)
