= Dangermuffin =

American folk band from South Carolina

Dangermuffin is a folk band from the South Carolina low country. The band plays gigs in North & South Carolina, West Virginia, and Virginia.

== Style ==
Dangermuffin's music is known for the songwriting and vocals of Dan Lotti, winner of the Songwriters Hall of Fame's 2005 New Writers Showcase. Their music receives airplay on Sirius XM Radio and was featured in the June 2011 issue of Relix Magazine. Dangermuffin was voted the Best Jam/Groove/Reggae Band of the Year in the 2011 Charleston City Paper Music Awards.

== Philanthropy ==
Dangermuffin donated a percentage of their merchandise sales to the Ronald McDonald House Charity of Charleston. They also hosted the Turkey Jam, a benefit for the Lowcountry Food Bank, raising over $3,000.

== Discography ==
- Beermuda (2007)
- Emancee (2008 EP)
- Moonscapes (2010)
- Olly Oxen Free (2012)
- Songs for the Universe (2014)
- Heritage (2017)
- Dangermuffin (2024)

== Members ==
Dan Lotti - lyrics and acoustic guitar
Mike Sivilli - lyrics and electric guitar
Steven Sandifer - lyrics, upright bass guitar and drums (2008–2019)
Johnny Calamari - bass (2018–Present)
Jim Donnelly - drums (2007–2008)
