= Yellow Dubmarine =

Tribute band from Washington D.C., United States

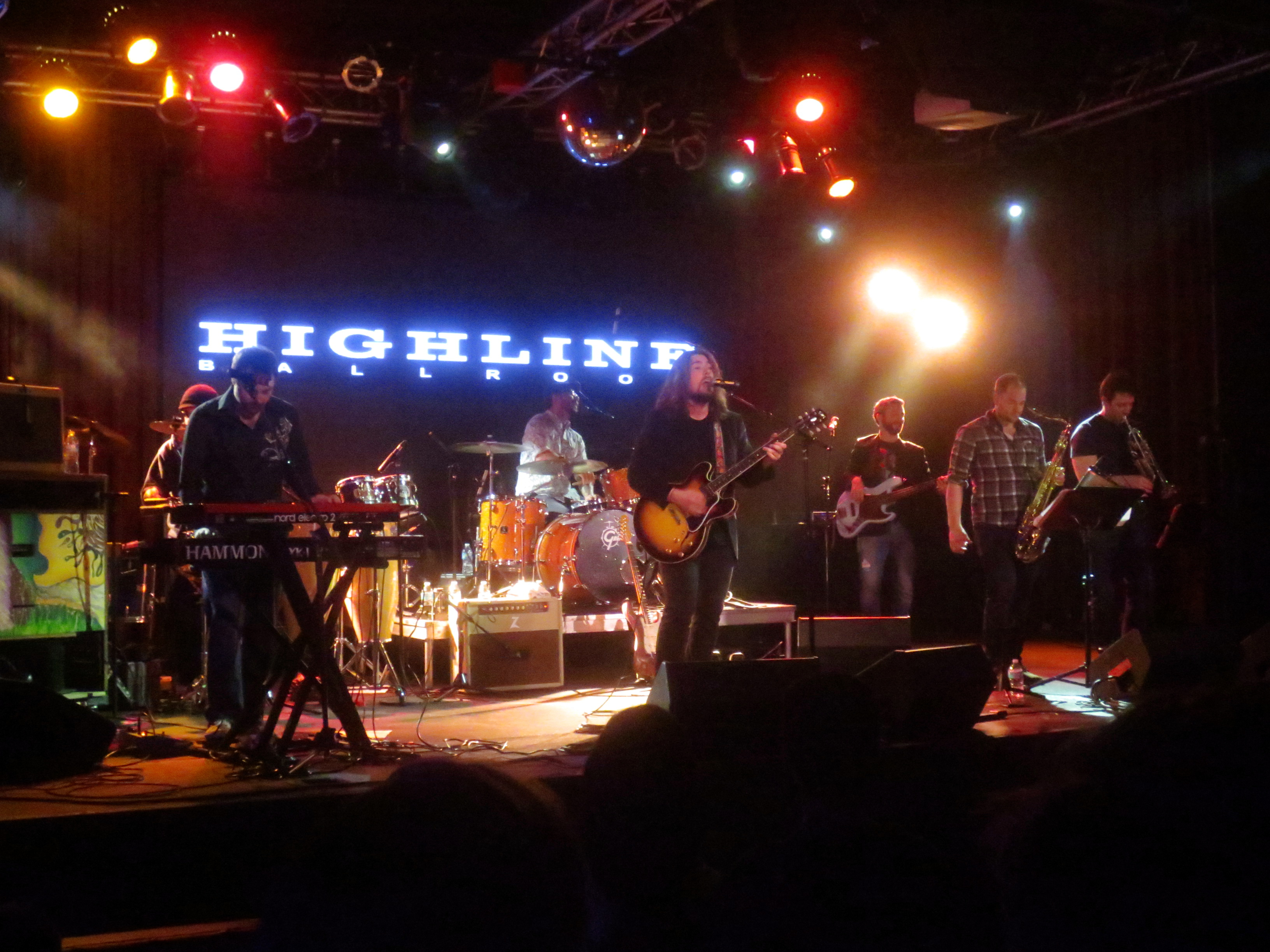
- Yellow Dubmarine performing in 2016.

Background information
- Origin: Baltimore, Maryland, Washington, D.C., United States
- Genres: Reggae, rock
- Years active: 2010–present
- Members: Robbie Cooper - Drums Vocals; Jonathan Drye - Percussion; Mario D'Ambrosio - Sax; Aaron Glaser - Bass, Vocals; Andrew James - Trombone; Luke Schuster - Keys, Vocals; Jonathan Sloane - Guitar
- Website: Yellowdubmarine.com

Yellow Dubmarine is an American reggae Beatles tribute band, based out of Washington, D.C., United States. The band is known for their live performances, blending "various elements of reggae, dub, funk and rocksteady" in order to recreate and pay tribute to The Beatles.

== Discography ==
=== Albums ===
- Abbey Dub (September 30, 2011)
