= The 4onthefloor =

American rock band

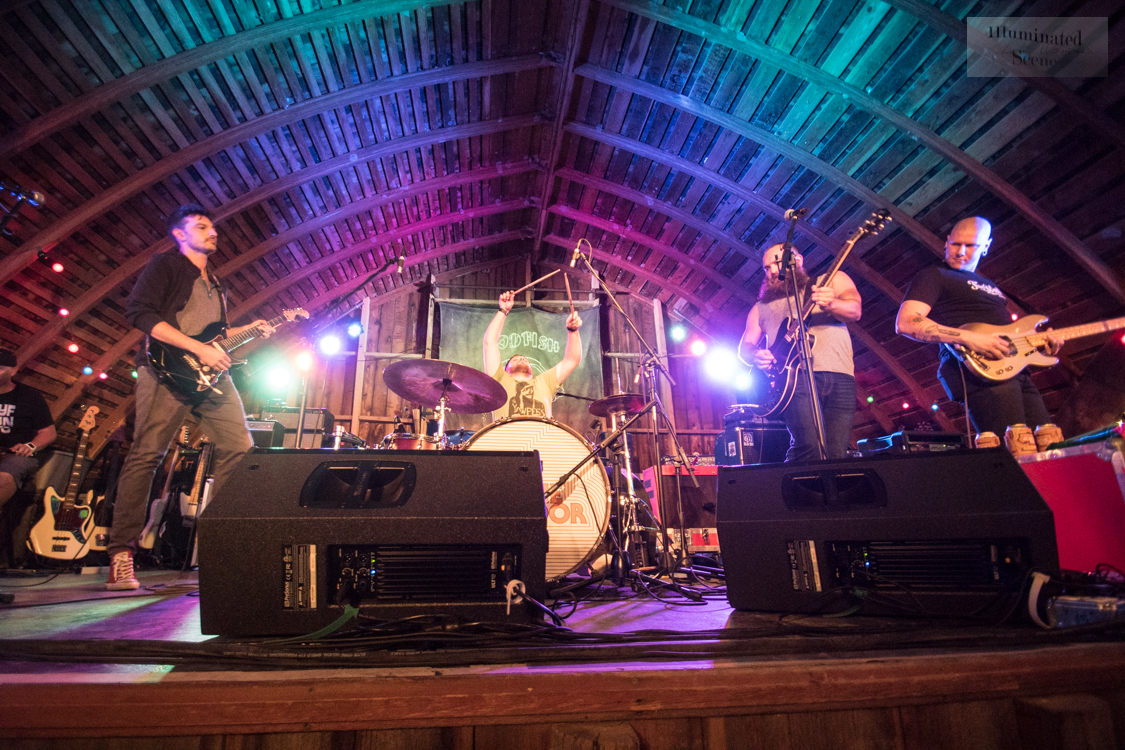

Background information
- Also known as: 4onthefloor
- Origin: Minneapolis, Minnesota
- Genres: Rock, blues, rock and roll
- Years active: 2009–present
- Label: Double Asterisk Group (US)
- Members: Gabriel Douglas; Nick Costa; Matt Brandes; Jake Quam
- Past members: James Gould; Chris Holm; Mark Larson
- Website: www.4otf.com

The 4onthefloor is an American rock and roll band from Minneapolis, Minnesota, formed in 2009. The group is known for each member playing a bass drum and for writing all their songs in 4/4 time, evoking their namesake. Their music has been featured in such television shows as ABC’s Nashville and A&E’s Duck Dynasty, including a feature as the main theme on the Season 1 DVD. The group has produced five original albums and has been featured on a number of compilation albums, including American Buffalo. The 4onthefloor’s debut record, 4×4, has been called “one of the best rock and roll records of 2011,” by Indie Media Magazine. Their live show is known for keeping “packed crowd[s] intensely involved for an entire show”, with “call-and-response choruses” and “meaty guitar riffs.” Their sound has been reviewed as “heavy-stomping blues-rock.”

The 4onthefloor beat more than 200 bands to be named Vita.mn's best new band of 2011. They have played a number of music festivals, including Austin's South By Southwest. They tour the United States often and have played with big-name artists such as Willie Nelson, Steve Martin, Tommy Stinson (of the Replacements), Lynyrd Skynyrd, Sugarland, Trampled by Turtles, Drive-By Truckers, Citizen Cope, David Allan Coe, Murder by Death, Ha Ha Tonka, These United States, and Retribution Gospel Choir.

== History ==
=== Formation ===
Gabriel Douglas met guitarist James Gould in Duluth, Minnesota. They bonded over Led Zeppelin and rock & roll. Gabriel's job as a booker of late-night UMD events led him to work for the Varsity Theater in Minneapolis. When he discovered a bass drum left behind from a show, the idea for the band was formed. Soon after, he brought on bassist Chris Holm and drummer Mark Larson and the four of them formed The 4onthefloor.

=== Sound ===
When the band came together, Holm and Larson's traditional blues background helped form their “heavy stomping blues-rock” sound. They chose the constraint of playing all of their songs in four on the floor style, with each member at a bass drum and all their songs in 4/4 time. Gould has said this format is “limiting in a way that really forces you to be more creative.” This has also led to reviews appreciating that “songs never really let up or devolve into any sort of arty-farty, jagged song structure. It’s purely meat-and-potatoes rock, really well cooked.”

Douglas describes the band's blues-inspired style in universal terms, noting “however you measure your life, you will find struggle. And that’s where the blues are rooted.” However, they have been reviewed as having “a sound more common to the Deep South than the Great White North.”

In concert, they evoke a “swampy Juke in Mississippi.” They play “the old blues, with an independent rock and roll spirit.” When asked about his goals for their music, Douglas has noted he hopes to “bring back more traditional blues overtones and a sense of urgency.”

== 4x4 (2011-2012) ==
With the release of 4x4, on February 8, 2011, the band saw growing popularity in the upper Midwest. They started winning over crowds city by city across Minnesota and Wisconsin, and on March 4, 2011 the band won Vita.mn's Are You Local? new band contest solidifying themselves as a staple of the Twin Cities Music Scene.

After playing SXSW 2011, the band self-released a double LP of 4x4 on April 4, 2011, and continued to see press coverage in national publications. The Dead Hub called the band, “…old souls making incredible new music.” The band then began touring across the country and spent the summer opening for acts like Willie Nelson, Lynyrd Skynyrd, Sugarland, Trampled by Turtles, Drive-by Truckers, Citizen Cope, Steve Martin, David Allan Coe, Murder by Death, Ha Ha Tonka, These United States, Retribution Gospel Choir, Tommy Stinson (of the Replacements).

The band started to find success across the US in early 2012 finding themselves reaching number 6 on Billboard's Uncharted chart. Minnesota Public Radio's 89.3FM The Current threw its full support behind the band premiering songs and continually playing music from The 4onthefloor. The band also found success with its cover of M. Ward's “Magic Trick”.

== Albums ==
=== Studio releases ===
- All In (2015)
- Spirit of Minneapolis (2013)
- ...And 4 Riders Approached at Dawn (2011)
- 4x4 (2011)

=== Live, Splits, and Compilations ===
- Heartbeats / The 4onthefloor 7” Split (2012)
- Lion & Lamp 7” Split (2012)
- American Buffalo (2012)

=== EPs ===
- 4 Songs EP (2010)
