= Cris Jacobs =

American singer-songwriter

Cris Jacobs is an American singer-songwriter from Baltimore, Maryland, United States. A local fixture in Maryland music, Jacobs was called "The King of Baltimore Rock' n 'Roll" by Baltimore magazine.

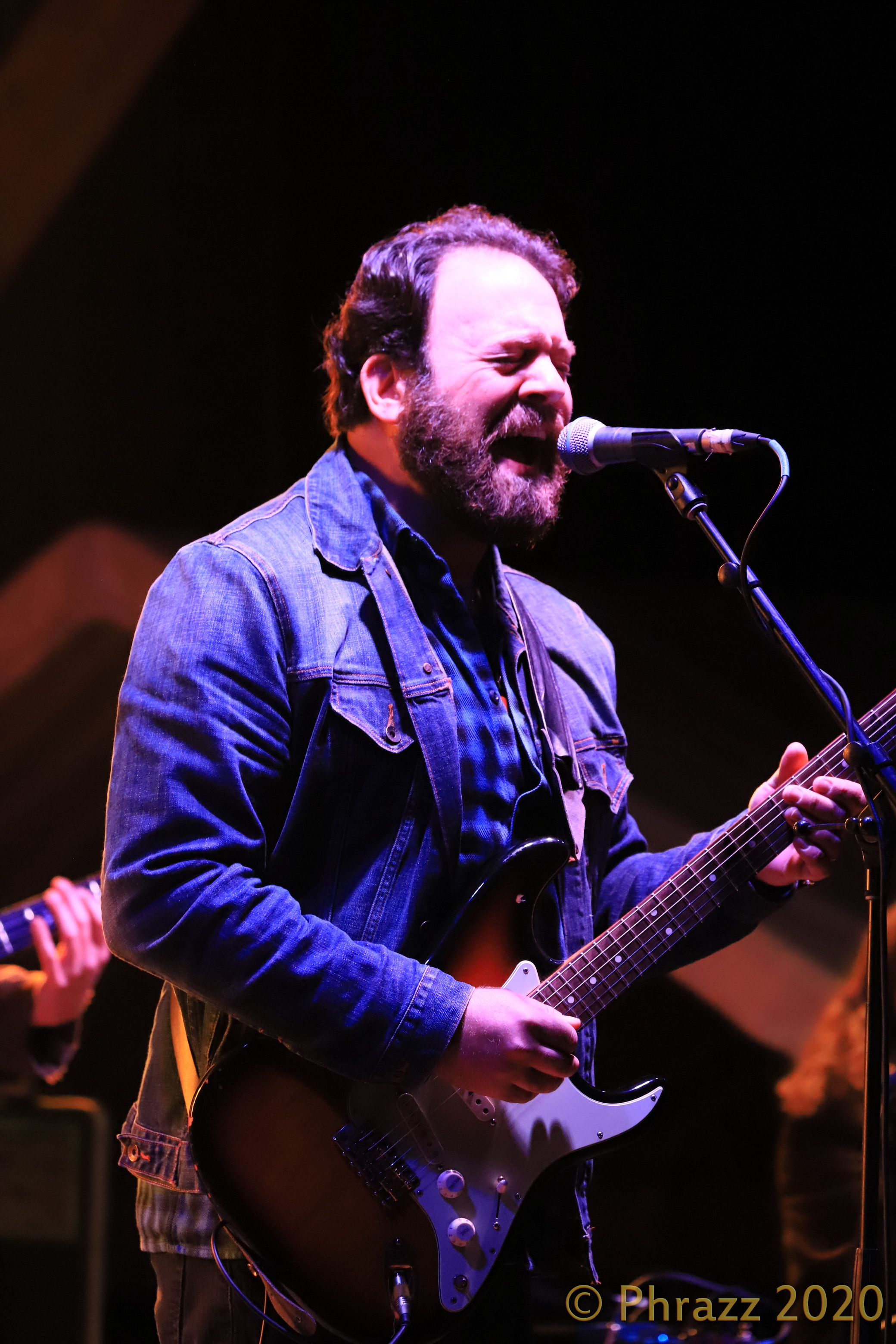
Cris Jacobs at B Chord Brewing - Oct 17, 2020

== Career and personal life ==
In the early 2000s, Jacobs played (alongside Patrick McAvinue) in a bluegrass band, Smooth Kentucky, in the Baltimore area. Concomitantly, Jacobs was the guitarist and vocalist for The Bridge from the band's founding in 2001 until its breakup in 2011. Following the end of The Bridge in 2011, Jacobs formed the Cris Jacobs Band. The band’s lineup was fluid for the first few years of existence, before settling on the steady rhythm section of bassist Todd Herrington and drummer Dusty Ray Simmons, and guitarist Johnathan Sloane. Sloane left in 2019 and was replaced by guitarist Corey Wells and keyboardist Ben White.

In 2012, Jacobs released his solo debut album with the Cris Jacobs Band, Songs for Cats and Dogs, which led to tours supporting Steve Winwood and Sturgill Simpson in following years. His sophomore full-length, Dust to Gold, arrived in 2016. Jacobs and Ivan Neville recorded an album together as Neville Jacobs in 2017. In 2019, he released his third solo album, Color Where You Are, on Blue Rose Records.

Jacobs holds an annual Christmas concert in the Washington, D.C. area called A Very Jerry Christmas. Between the releases of Dust to Gold and Color Where You Are, Jacobs married and became a father.

== Discography ==
As leader

- Songs for Cats and Dogs (Self-released, 2012)
- Dust to Gold (American Showplace Music, 2016)
- Color Where You Are (Blue Rose Records, 2019)
- One of These Days (Soundly Music, 2024)

With The Bridge

- The Bridge (The Purple Album) (Self-released, 2002)
- Cross Street Market (Self-released, 2004)
- The Bridge (Hyena, 2006)
- Blind Man's Hill (Hyena, 2008)
- National Bohemian (Woodberry, 2011)

With Ivan Neville

- Neville Jacobs (Harmonized Records, 2018)
