= Ekoostik hookah =

American jam band

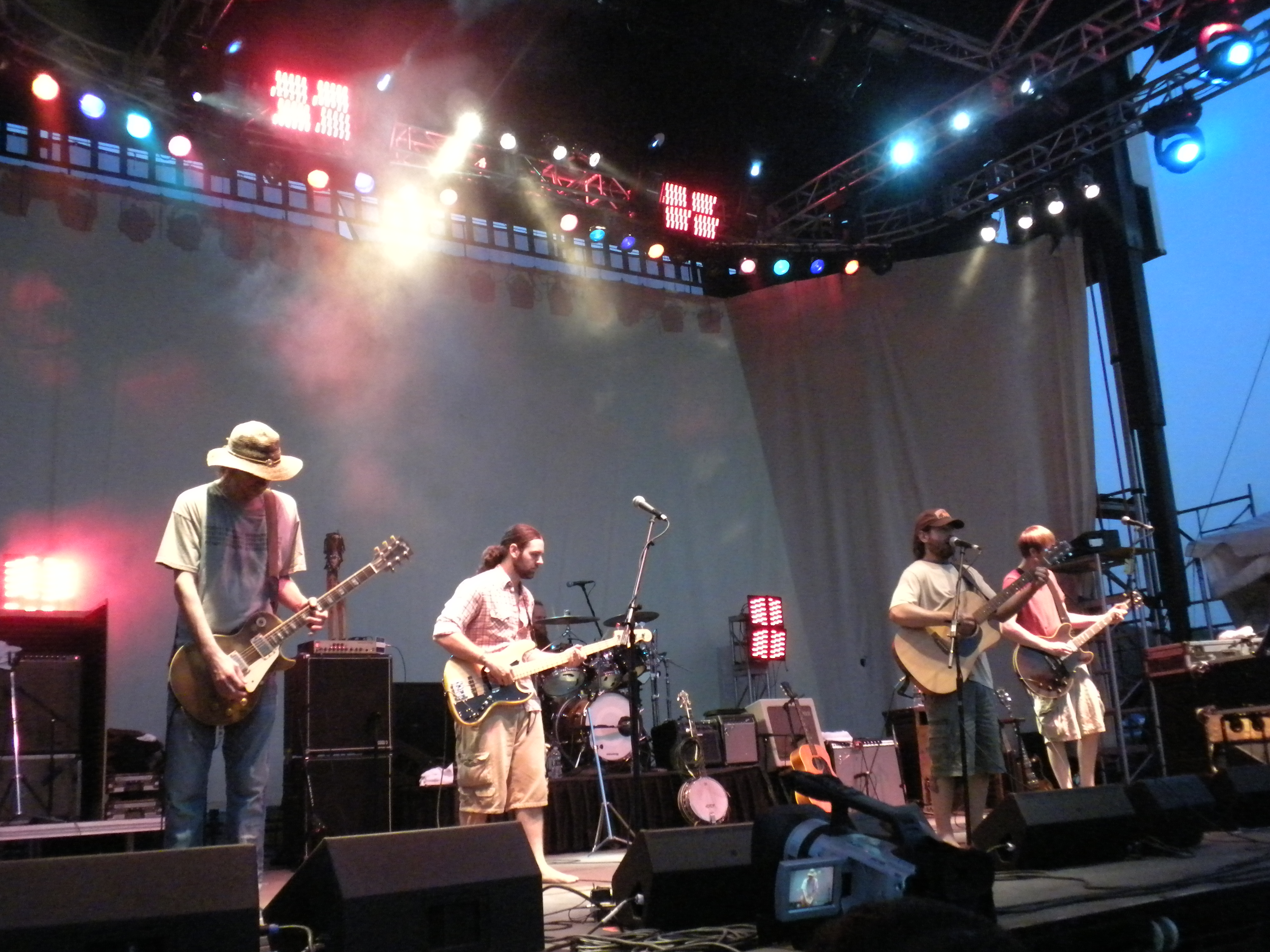

Background information
- Origin: Fredericktown, Ohio
- Genres: Rock, psychedelic rock, jam band
- Years active: 1991–present
- Members: Dave Katz; Steve Sweney; Eric Lanese; Eric Sargent; Matt Paetsch
- Past members: John Mullins; Cliff Starbuck; Ed McGee; Johnny Polansky; Steve Frye; Don Safranek; Phil Risko
- Website: www.ekoostik.com

Ekoostik hookah (styled əkoostik hookah) is a jam band from Columbus, Ohio. Formed in 1991, the band has made multiple national tours in the US, as well as performing in overseas locales like Amsterdam and Jamaica, although they may more commonly be found playing local Columbus, Ohio venues like Newport Music Hall and Lifestyle Communities Pavilion. They are fixtures in many fine venues across the midwest. The band has shared the stage with many of today's top touring "jam bands", as well as stars such as Willie Nelson, Arlo Guthrie, Dr. John, Bob Weir, and Bruce Hornsby.

The band's name, pronounced "Acoustic Hookah", was taken from dictionary entries for the two words. The phonetic spellings were chosen, and the schwa (ə) became the band's official symbol. "Schwa" is also the title of a song by keyboardist and primary songwriter Dave Katz. The band endorses a number of charitable causes; among them, Pittsburgh's ongoing BurghSTOCK Concert Series that benefits area non-profits that assist homeless and disabled military veterans.

== Hookahville ==
Hookahville is a semi-annual music festival featuring performances from local and regional bands and usually hosted and headlined by Ekoostik hookah. Formerly located at Legend Valley in Thornville, Ohio or at Frontier Ranch in Kirkersville, Ohio, it was moved to Zane Shawnee Caverns in Bellefontaine, Ohio, in 2017 where Hookahville 50 was held in September 2018 and was Ekoostik hookah's reunion show with eh2.0. Hookahville 51 was held at Brushy Fork Phamily Ranch in Newark, OH in May 2019. Hookahville 52 was held at Clear Fork Adventure Resort in Butler, Ohio where eh2.0 returned for one more performance. Spring Hookahville is held the weekend before Memorial Day weekend; the end of summer version is held during Labor Day weekend. In November, 2020, an event was held online due to the COVID-19 pandemic but is not considered the official Hookahville 53 which was ultimately postponed until September of the following year.

== Members ==
- Dave Katz - vocals/keyboards/acoustic guitar (member inception–present)
- Steve Sweney - lead guitar (member inception–present)
- Eric Lanese - drums/vocals (member 1993–present)
- Matt Paetsch - Bass (member 2018–present)
- Eric Sargent - vocals/guitar (member April 2010 – present)
- John Mullins - vocals, rhythm guitar (member inception–1996, 2006–2010, no longer with the band as of April 5, 2010)
- Cliff Starbuck - bass/vocals (member inception–2009, left band at the end of 2009 to pursue other musical projects)
- Ed McGee-guitar/vocals (member 1996–2005)
- Johnny Polansky-percussion/drums (member 2000–2005)
- Steve Frye (a.k.a. "Octofrye") - drums (member inception–1993)
- Don Safranek - percussion (member 1992–1994)
- Phil Risko - bass, vocals (2010-2017)

== Discography ==
- Under Full Sail (1991)
- Dubbabuddah (1994)
- Double Live (1996)
- Where the Fields Grow Green (1997)
- Sharp In the Flats (1999)
- Seahorse (2001)
- Ohio Grown (2002)
- Under Full Sail: It All Comes Together (2007)
- brij (2013)
- Halcyon (2017)
- 31 West (2021)
- The Schwa Album (2023)

== Filmography ==
- Spring Hookahville (2004), YBP
- New Year's Eve (2005), YBP
- Live at the Newport (2007), YBP
- Almost Legal (2011), The film was recorded at the March 12, 2011 concert at the Newport Music Hall in Columbus, Ohio in celebration of the band's 20th anniversary. It was produced by Desert Custom Photography Las Vegas.

== See also ==
- List of jam band music festivals
