= The New Deal (band) =

Canadian musical group

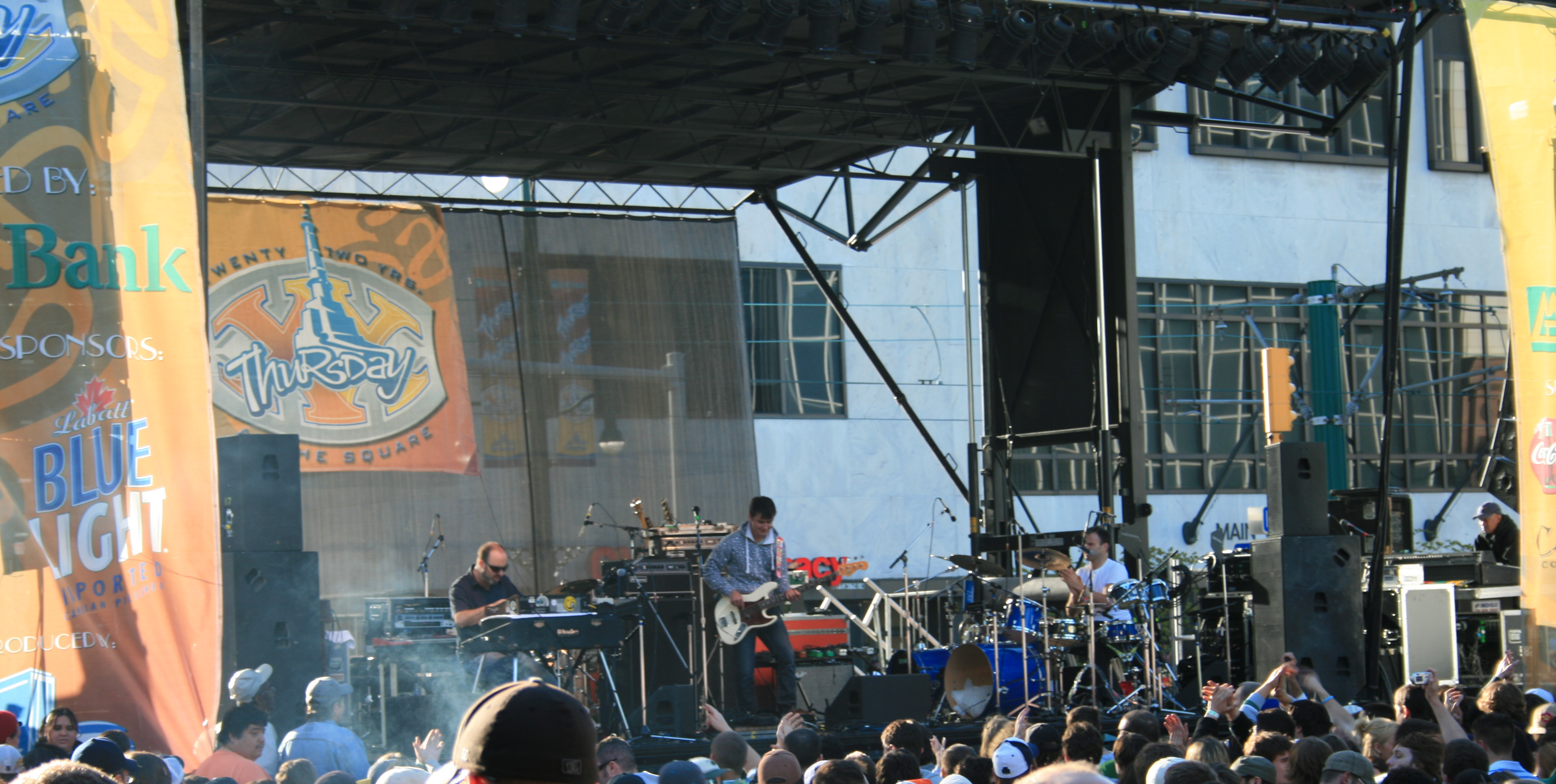
- The New Deal playing at Thursday at the Square in Buffalo, New York

Background information
- Origin: Toronto, Ontario, Canada
- Genres: Electronica; house
- Years active: 1998–present
- Labels: Jive Electro; Sound+Light Records
- Members: Jamie Shields; Dan Kurtz; Davide Direnzo
- Past members: Darren Shearer; Joel Stouffer
- Website: www.thenewdeal.com

The New Deal is a Canadian three-piece electronic band formed in 1998 in Toronto, Ontario, Canada. With a drummer (Davide Direnzo), bass guitarist (Dan Kurtz, now playing with Dragonette), and keyboard player (Jamie Shields), the music incorporates many elements of modern electronica, which they have branded live progressive breakbeat house.

== History ==
The band formed in 1998 after an impromptu jam session they had at the Toronto venue the Comfort Zone. They released the jam session as their first album, This Is Live.

The band was without a name prior to the release of This Is Live. Jamie Shields, whose previous band One Step Beyond had wrapped up recently, indicated that the band hadn't settled on a name. At one point, they were calling themselves "Reprise". "The New Deal" stuck shortly afterwards.

Originally billing themselves as an acid jazz group, they soon found themselves swept up into the emerging musical genre of livetronica. The drumming of Shearer often resembles the simplicity of a drum machine, while still tastefully complementing the accompanying music. Shields never loops a keyboard track and always plays everything live, even if a pattern is to be repeated. Thanks to the widespread sharing of bootleg versions of their early live shows, a national buzz ensued and within two years, and they signed a major label contract with Jive Electro.

The promotion with Jive proved disappointing, and the band fell short of a highly anticipated crossover. Nonetheless, they continued to tour, developing their fanbase, including a performance in Toronto at the Palais Royale in 2001.

They released several more live shows on a label they created, Sound+Light Records, and produced two studio releases in 2003: Please Be Seated and Gone Gone Gone. In 2004, after a year-long hiatus, The New Deal toured several cities, often playing to crowds of 800 or more demonstrating the continued devotion of their fans.

The band continued to tour, and over 200 recorded shows have been made available at the Internet Archive and etree. In recent years, seeing the band live has been difficult as concerts have become sporadic. Only a few recent concerts have been made available because of difficulties accommodating "tapers" and obtaining soundboard recordings.

On April 8, 2011, an e-mail was sent out stating The New Deal would be breaking up in 2011. According to the e-mail, the band feels "We have come to a point where the time and commitment that it takes to maintain our band at its best is no longer possible." A summer and fall tour took place throughout North America to end off the 12-year career.

In April 2014, the band resurrected their website with the text, "The New Deal is Back – Summer 2014". Joel Stouffer was brought on board as a new drummer in 2014. According to Shields, original drummer Darren Shearer left the music business after the group originally parted ways.

On March 20, 2019, the band announced on Facebook that they are coming back together for a short summer run of four shows with Davide Di Renzo as a new drummer, going on to say "With Davide it's a bit like 'coming back home' as he was the drummer that inspired our original direction back in 1998 when the three of us played our first impromptu gig together in Guelph, Ontario. Each of the band's drummers has brought something unique to theNEWDEAL, and with Davide we're reaching back to move forward with the organic-infused improvisation that has long-inspired a big part of theNEWDEAL sound." In August of that year, they announced a tour schedule through the following February with Di Renzo.

Currently, theNEWDEAL occasionally performs with different drummers (most recently, Joe Russo), but don't plan on going on another major tour any time soon.

== Recordings ==
- THIS IS LIVE (1999)
- The New Deal (2001)
- Receiver (2001)
- LIVE:NYC 05.31.02 / 06.01.02 (2002)
- LIVE:PORTLAND ME 12.17.99 / GUELPH ON 04.05.00 (REISSUE) (2002)
- Gone Gone Gone (2003)
- Please Be Seated EP (2003)
- Live: Late Night 8.27.05 (2006)
- Live: Toronto 7.16.09 (2009)
- Mercury Switch (2016)
- Phoenix (2019)
- Age of Discovery (2020)
- Isolation Suite EP (2020)
- Sultan (Live) (2025)
