= Jam band =

Type of band characterized by jamming

- Stylistic origins: Jazz; folk; country; psychedelic rock; acid rock; progressive rock; jazz fusion; blues rock; southern rock; funk (later instances)
- Cultural origins: 1960s, California, United States
- Typical instruments: Vocals; electric guitar; bass guitar; acoustic guitar; drums; piano; synthesizer; keyboards
- Derivative forms: Progressive bluegrass; Livetronica

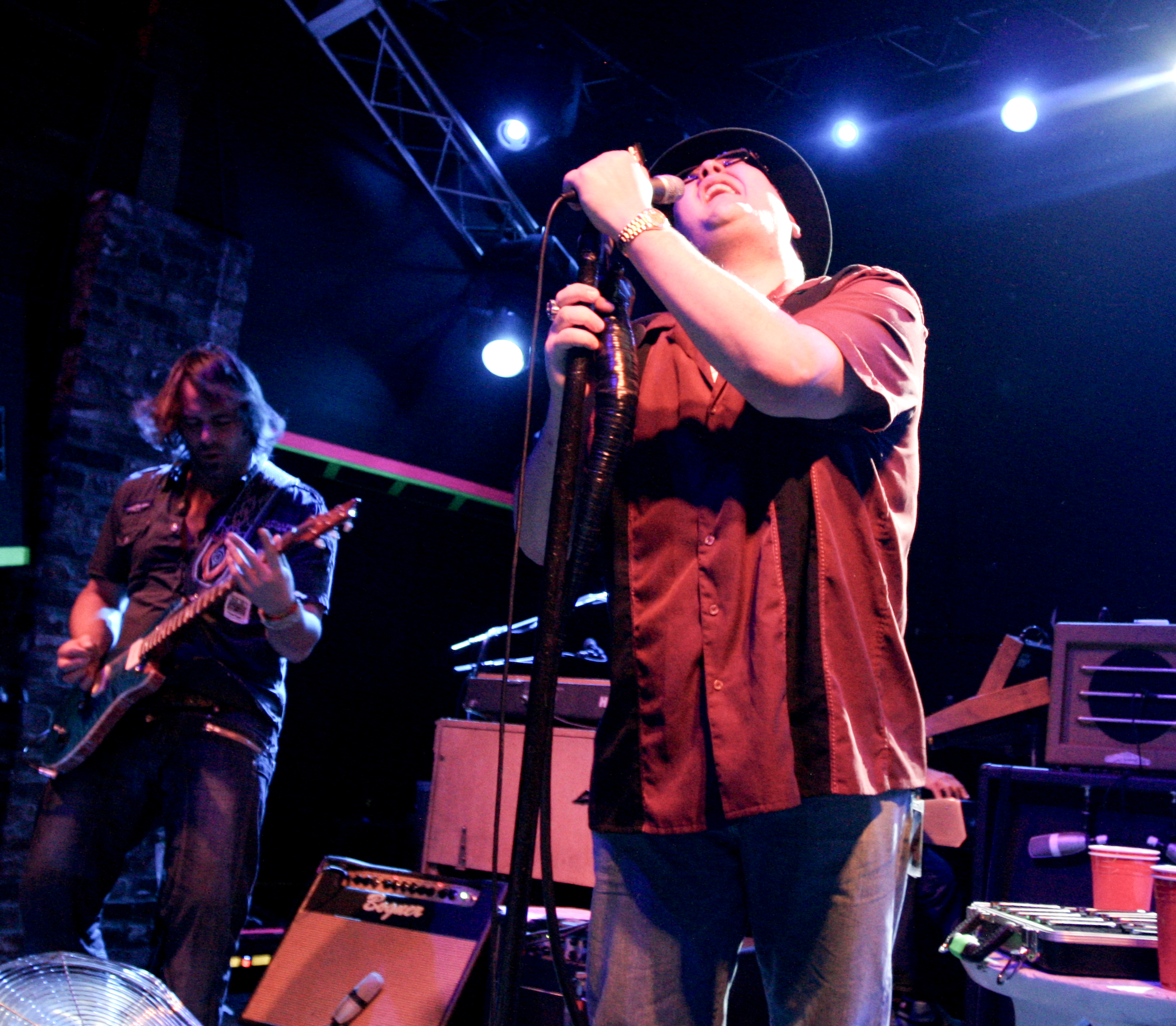
Blues Traveler performing in 2008

A jam band is a musical group whose concerts and live albums substantially feature improvisational "jamming". Typically, jam bands will play variations of pre-existing songs, extending them to improvise over chord patterns or rhythmic grooves. Jam bands are known for having a very fluid structure, playing long sets of music which often cross genre boundaries, varying their nightly setlists, and segueing from one song into another without a break.

Originally emerging from the psychedelic rock movement of the 1960s, the style was pioneered by acts such as the Grateful Dead, the Free Spirits, Love, the Yardbirds, the Paul Butterfield Blues Band, the Mothers of Invention, Jefferson Airplane, Soft Machine, Cream, the Jimi Hendrix Experience, Pink Floyd and the Allman Brothers Band. In the late 1980s and early 1990s, the style influenced a new wave of jam bands who toured the United States such as Phish, Blues Traveler, Widespread Panic, Dave Matthews Band, The String Cheese Incident, moe., and Col. Bruce Hampton and the Aquarium Rescue Unit. The jam-band movement gained mainstream exposure in the US in the early 1990s with the rise of Phish and the Dave Matthews Band as major touring acts and the dissolution of the Grateful Dead following Jerry Garcia's death in 1995.

Jam-band artists often perform a wide variety of genres. While the Grateful Dead is categorized as psychedelic rock, by the 1990s the term "jam band" was applied to acts that incorporated genres such as blues, country music, contemporary folk music, funk, progressive rock, world music, jazz fusion, Southern rock, alternative rock, acid jazz, bluegrass, folk rock and electronic music into their sound. Although the term has been used to describe cross-genre and improvisational artists, it retains an affinity to the fan cultures of the Grateful Dead or Phish.

A feature of the jam-band scene is fan recording of live concerts. While the mainstream music industry often views fan taping as "illegal bootlegging", jam bands often allow their fans to make tapes or recordings of their live shows. Fans trade recordings and collect recordings of different live shows, because improvisational jam bands play their songs differently at each performance.

== History ==
=== Modern use and definition ===
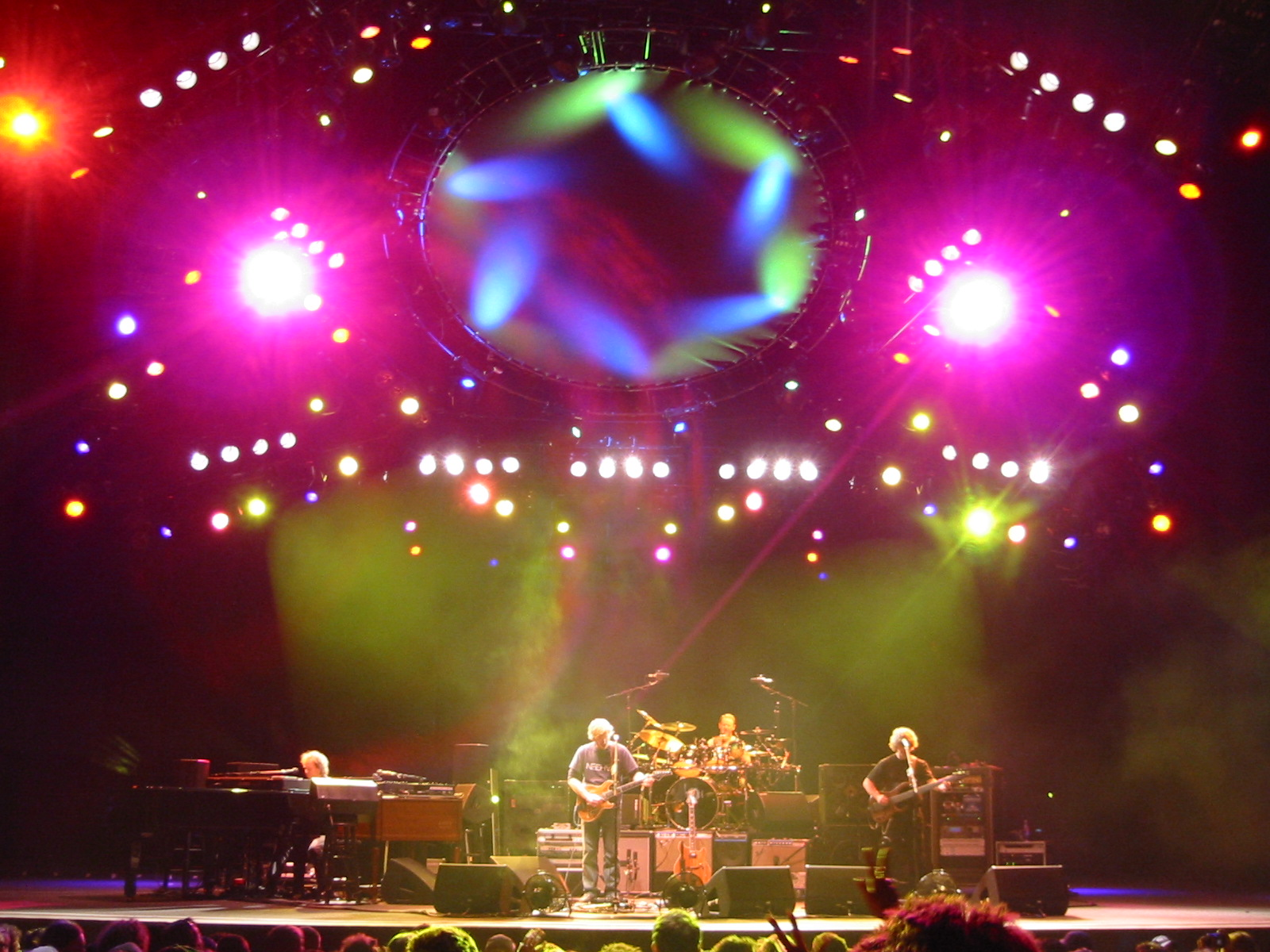
Phish is an example of a jam band.

In the 1980s, the Grateful Dead's fan base included a large core group that followed their tours from show to show. These fans (known as "Deadheads") developed a sense of community and loyalty. In the 1990s, the band Phish began to attract this fan base. The term "jam band" was first used regarding Grateful Dead and Phish culture in the 1980s. In 1998, Dean Budnick wrote the first book devoted to the subject, entitled Jam Bands. He founded Jambands.com later that year and is often credited with coining the term. However, in his second book on the subject, 2004's Jambands: A Complete Guide to the Players, Music & Scene, he explains that he only popularized it.

Rolling Stone magazine asserted in a 2004 biography that Phish "was the living, breathing, noodling definition of the term" jam band, in that it became a "cultural phenomenon, followed across the country from summer shed to summer shed by thousands of new-generation hippies and hacky-sack enthusiasts, and spawning a new wave of bands oriented around group improvisation and super-extended grooves." Another term for "jam band music" used in the 1990s was "Bay Rock". It was coined by the founder of Relix magazine, Les Kippel, as a reference to the 1960s San Francisco Bay Area music scene, which included the Grateful Dead, Jefferson Airplane and Moby Grape, among many others.

By the late 1990s, the types of jam bands had grown so that the term became quite broad, as exemplified by the definition written by Dean Budnick, which appeared in the program for the first annual Jammy Awards in 2000 (Budnick co-created the show with Wetlands Preserve owner Peter Shapiro).

What Is a Jam Band? Please cast aside any preconceptions that this phrase may evoke. The term, as it is commonly used today, references a rich palette of sounds and textures. These groups share a collective penchant for improvisation, a commitment to songcraft, and a propensity to cross genre boundaries, drawing from a range of traditions including blues, bluegrass, funk, jazz, rock, psychedelia, and even techno. Besides, the jam bands of today are unified by the nimble ears of their receptive listeners.

Although in 2007 the term may have been used to describe nearly any cross-genre band, festival band, or improvisational band, the term retains an affinity to Grateful Dead-like bands such as Phish. Andy Gadiel, the initial webmaster of Jambands.com, states in Budnick's 2004 edition of Jambands that the music "...had a link that would not only unite bands themselves but also a very large community around them."

==== Ambiguity ====
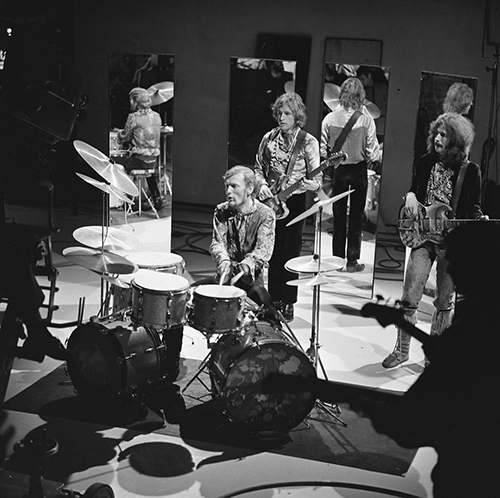
Cream performing in 1968

By the late 1990s, the term jam band became applied retroactively in jam band circles for bands such as Cream, who for decades were categorized as a "power-trio" and "psychedelic rock", and who when active were largely unrelated to the Grateful Dead, but whose live concerts usually featured several extended collective improvisations. In his October 2000 column on the subject for jambands.com, Dan Greenhaus attempted to explain the evolution of a jam band as such:

At this point, what you sing about, what instruments you play, how often you tour and how old you are has become virtually irrelevant. At this point, one thing is left and, ironically, after all these years, it's the single most important place one should focus on; the approach to the music. And the jamband or improvisational umbrella, essentially nothing more than a broad label for a diverse array of bands, is open wide enough to shelter several different types of bands, whether you are The Dave Matthews Band or RAQ.

The Jammy Awards have had members of non-jamming bands which were founded in the 1970s and were unrelated to the Grateful Dead perform at their show such as new wave band The B-52's. The Jammys have also awarded musicians from prior decades such as Frank Zappa.

==== Debate ====
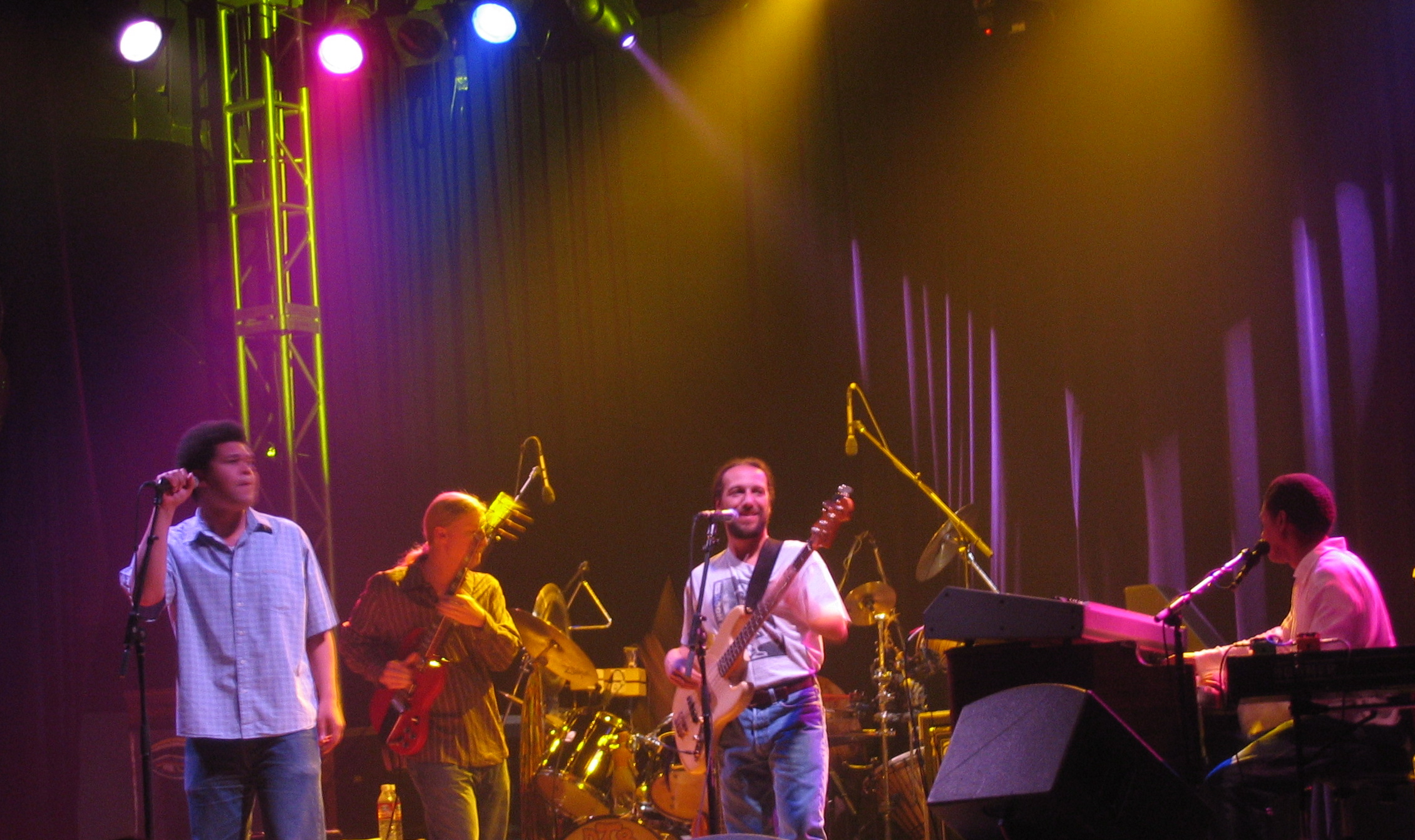
The Derek Trucks Band

Artists such as The Derek Trucks Band have resisted being labelled a jam band. Dave Schools of Widespread Panic said in an interview, "We want to shake free of that name, jam band. The jam band thing used to be the Grateful Dead bands. We shook free of that as hard as we could back in 1989. Then Blues Traveler came on the scene. All together, we created the H.O.R.D.E. tour, which focused a lot of attention on jam bands. Then someone coined the term jam bands. I'd rather just be called retro. When you pigeonhole something, you limit its ability to grow and change." An example of a prior-era band that gained the label "jam band" through an active affiliation with the 1990s jam band culture is The Allman Brothers Band. However, Gregg Allman has been quoted as recently as 2003 by his fellow band member Butch Trucks in stating that rather than being a jam band, The Allman Brothers are "a band that jams".

Although Trucks suggests that this is only a difference of semantics, the term has a recent history for which it is used exclusively. An example of this discernment is the acceptance of Les Claypool as a jam band in the year 2000. Though known for his decade with Primus (a band that jams) and solo works, it was after he created the Fearless Flying Frog Brigade with members of Ratdog and released Live Frogs Set 1 that as Budnick wrote had "marked [Claypool's] entry into [the jamband] world." Budnick has been both editor-in-chief of Jambands.com and executive editor of Relix magazine.

=== Late 1960s–1970s: The Dead and the Allmans ===
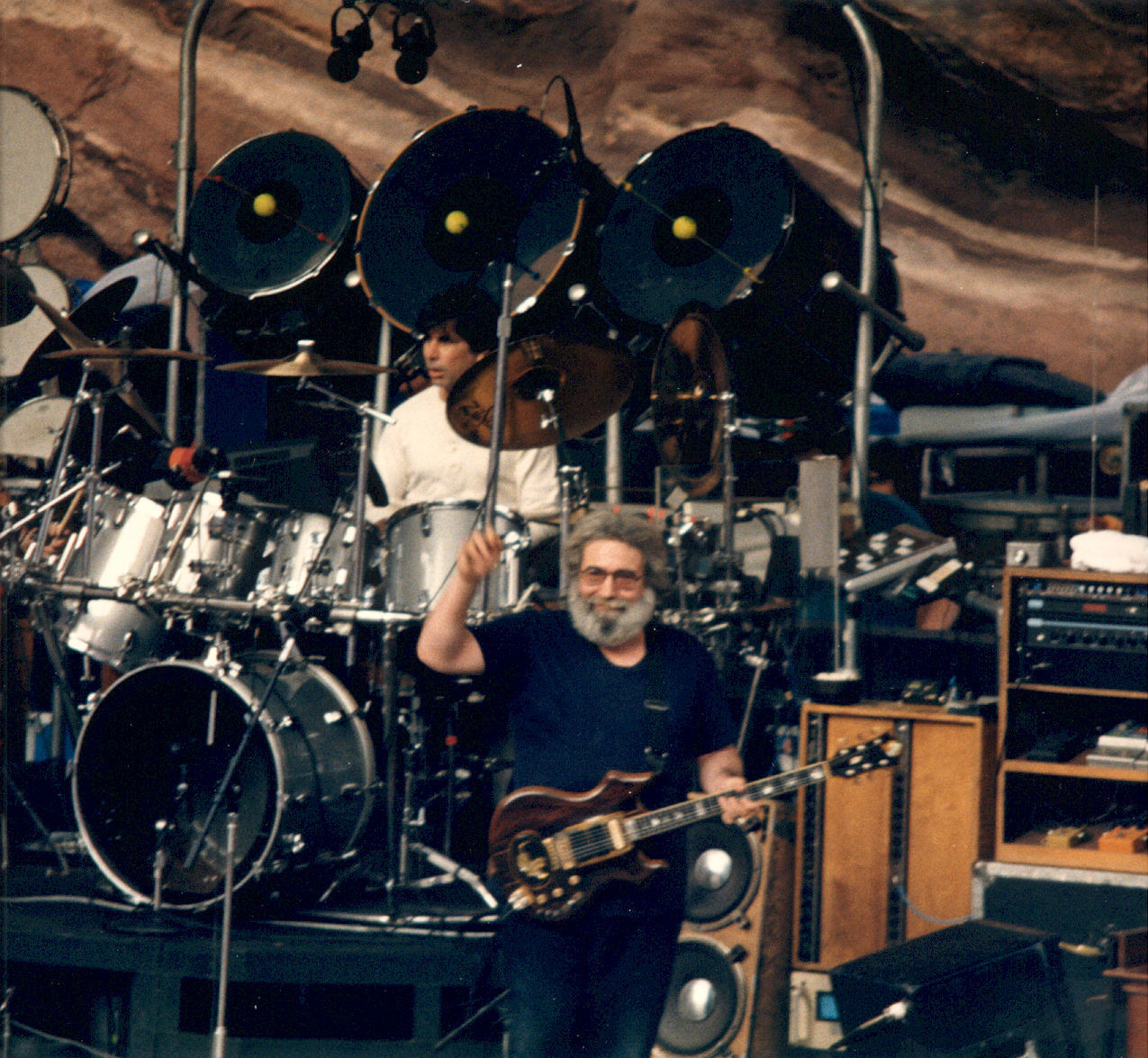
Grateful Dead's Jerry Garcia and Mickey Hart performing on 11 August 1987 at the Red Rocks Amphitheatre near Morrison, Colorado

The band that set the template for future jam bands was the Grateful Dead, founded in 1965 by San Francisco-based guitarist Jerry Garcia. The Dead attracted an enormous cult following, mainly on the strength of their live performances and live albums (their studio albums were only modest successes and received little radio play). The band specialized in improvisational jamming at concerts. They played long two-set shows, and gave their fans a different experience every night, with varying set lists, evolving songs, creative segues, and extended instrumentals. Some of their fans, known as "Deadheads", followed their tours from city to city, and a hippie subculture developed around the band, complete with psychedelic clothes, a black market in concert-related products, and drug paraphernalia. The band toured regularly for most of three decades.

The Allman Brothers Band were also considered a jam band, particularly during the Duane Allman era. Songs such as "In Memory of Elizabeth Reed" and "Whipping Post", which were 5–7 minutes long on their studio albums, became 20-minute jams at concerts. The Allmans performed a 34-minute jam with the Grateful Dead in 1970. Their 1972 album Eat A Peach included "Mountain Jam", a 34-minute instrumental that was recorded live. The 1971 live album At Fillmore East featured a 24-minute version of "Whipping Post", and a 20-minute version of Willie Cobbs' "You Don't Love Me".

The British space rock band Hawkwind were also progenitors of the jam band sound.

=== 1980–1999: Deadheads ===
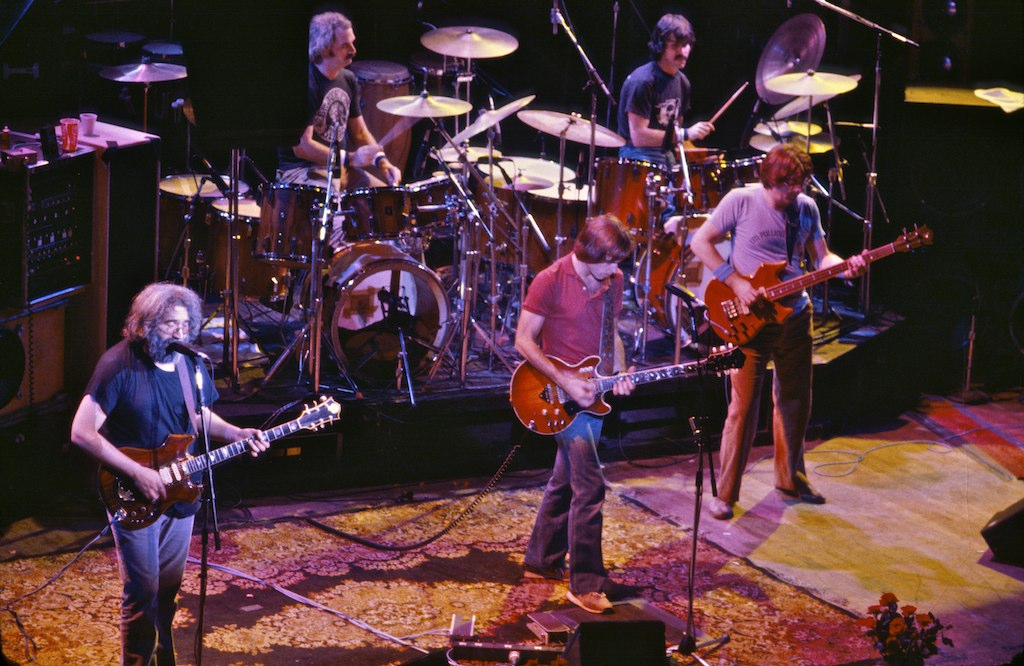
The Grateful Dead in 1980. Left to right: Jerry Garcia, Bill Kreutzmann, Bob Weir, Mickey Hart, Phil Lesh.

In the mid-1980s and early-1990s, the bands Phish, moe., Edie Brickell & New Bohemians, Blues Traveler, Ozric Tentacles, Widespread Panic, Dave Matthews Band, Bela Fleck and the Flecktones, Spin Doctors, The String Cheese Incident, Col. Bruce Hampton and the Aquarium Rescue Unit, Medeski Martin & Wood, The Black Crowes, Leftover Salmon, The Samples, Galactic, əkoostik hookah, and Lettuce, began touring with jam band-style concerts. Their popularity increased in the early 1990s.

Phish formed in 1983 at the University of Vermont. They solidified their lineup in 1985 and began their career with a few Grateful Dead songs in their repertoire. The Grateful Dead released "Touch of Grey" which became a hit song on MTV in 1987. They eventually began playing football stadiums. Widespread Panic originated when Michael Houser and John Bell started playing together. In 1986, after Todd Nance and Dave Schools joined them, the band played their first show as "Widespread Panic". Blues Traveler and Spin Doctors - formed and fronted by school friends John Popper and Chris Barron, respectively - regularly performed at the jam band-friendly venue Wetlands Preserve in New York City. In 1991 Dave Matthews, together with jazz musicians Carter Beauford and LeRoi Moore, formed a trio which - after Stefan Lessard joined them - became the first iteration of the Dave Matthews Band.

Improvisations have taken a backseat to more polished material, which may be due to their crossover commercial successes, MTV videos, and mainstream radio airplay. In the mid nineties, Dave Matthews band achieved commercial success and won a Grammy for Best Rock Performance with the song "So Much To Say". By the end of the decade, Phish had signed a recording contract with Elektra Records, and transformed from a New England/Northeast-based band into a national touring band (see: Colorado '88). With its fusion of southern rock, jazz, and blues, Widespread Panic has earned renown for appearing multiple times in Pollstar's "Concert Pulse" chart of the top fifty bands on the road, and they have performed more than 150 live dates a year."

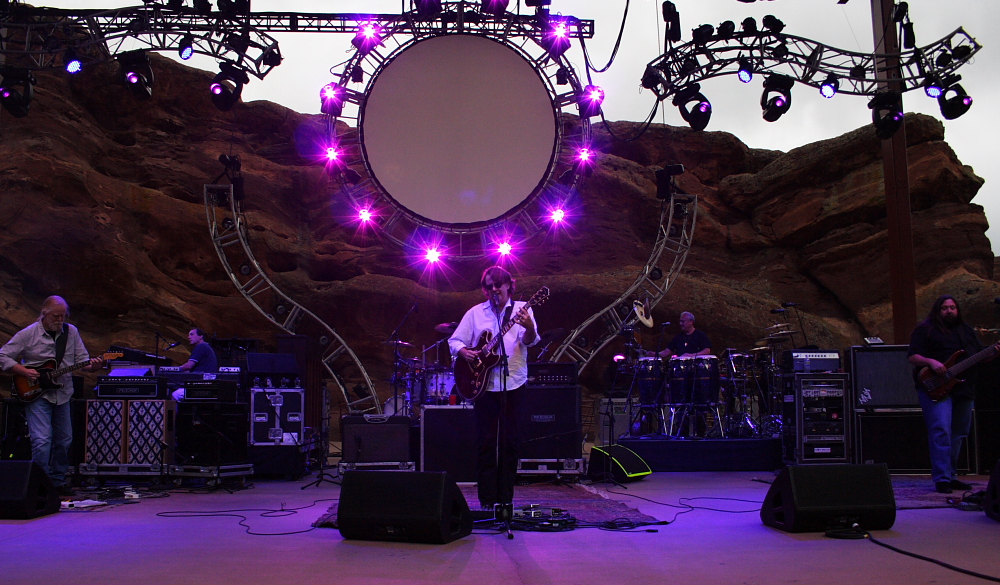
Widespread Panic playing at the Red Rocks Amphitheatre in 2010

In the early 1990s, a new generation of bands was spurred by the Grateful Dead's touring and the increased exposure of The Black Crowes, Phish, and Widespread Panic. At the same time, the Internet gained popularity and provided a medium for fans to discuss these bands and their performances as well as to view emerging concepts.

Phish and the Grateful Dead were two of the first bands to have a Usenet newsgroup. Many new bands were formed, which were the first to actually be called "jam bands", including ekoostik hookah, Dispatch, Gov't Mule, Leftover Salmon, moe., Rusted Root and The String Cheese Incident.

During the summer of 1995 Garcia died. The surviving members of the Grateful Dead formed The Other Ones (appearing as "The Dead" for some tours). During the same period, Phish rose to prominence, and bands such as String Cheese Incident and Blues Traveler became successful. Many Deadheads migrated to the Phish scene, and Phish became recognized as more mainstream.

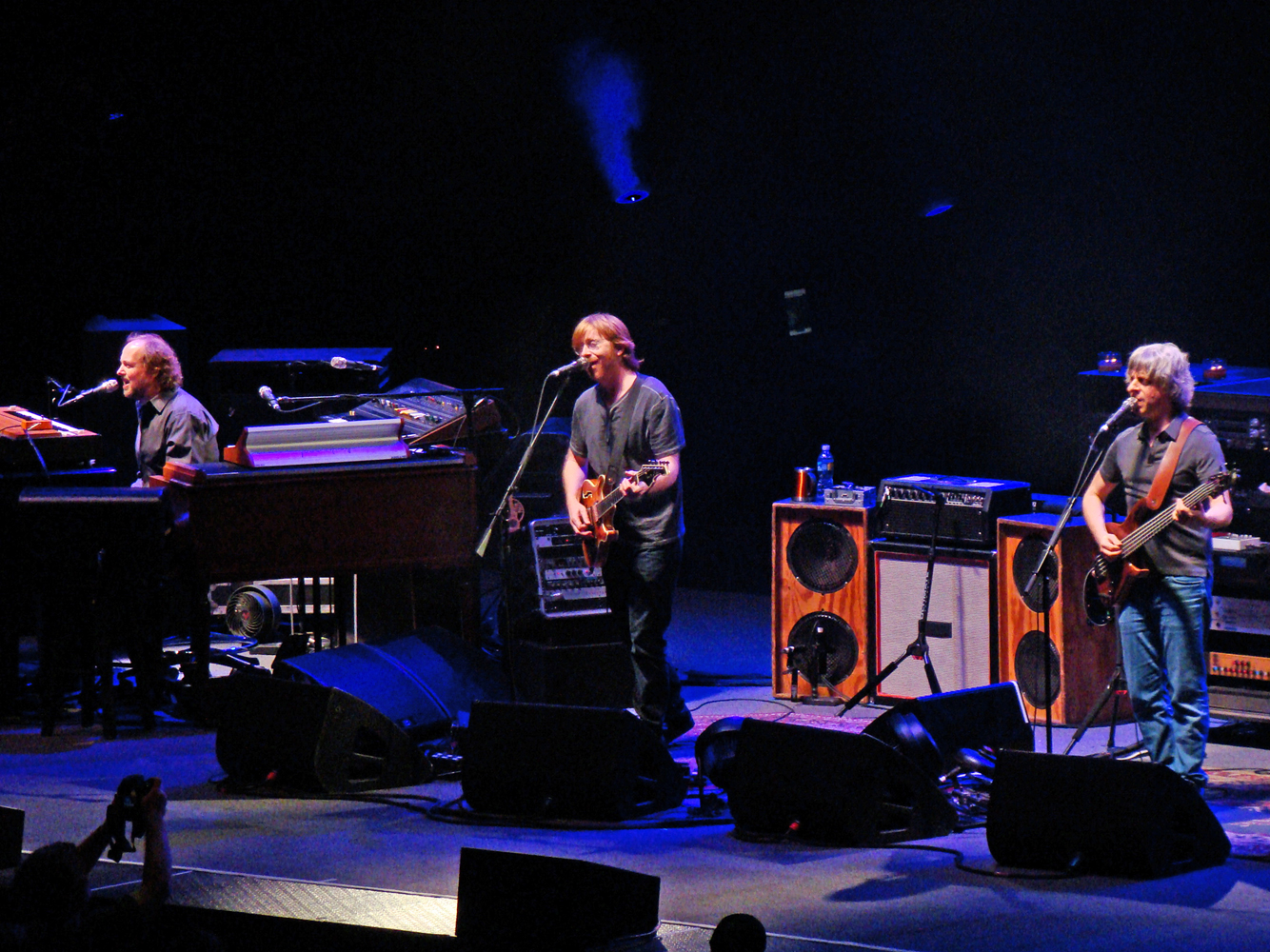
Phish performing at American Airlines Arena in Miami, 2009.

The jam-band scene gained more recognition during the late 1990s, with Dave Matthews Band and Phish being among the most influential bands of the genre, drawing large crowds to amphitheaters and arenas. Dave Matthews Band played at Woodstock '99 while Phish celebrated the new millennium with an enormous festival called "Big Cypress" in southern Florida, which concluded with an eight-hour set. Other jam bands followed the success of these festivals, notably the Disco Biscuits, who held their first Camp Bisco in 1999, and moe., which began its annual moe.down festivals in 2000.

=== 2000–present ===
The third generation of jam bands appeared in the late 1990s and early 2000s, many inspired by Phish and other acts of the second wave. These included Soulive, Gov't Mule, The Derek Trucks Band, Steve Kimock Band and My Morning Jacket. Additionally, groups such as The Disco Biscuits and Sound Tribe Sector 9 added electronic and techno elements into their performances, developing the livetronica subgenre. The early 2010s saw a fourth generation of jam bands, including Dopapod, Pigeons Playing Ping Pong, CBDB, Goose, Twiddle, Moon Taxi and Spafford. Members of the Grateful Dead have continued touring since 1995 in many different iterations, such as The Dead, Bob Weir & Ratdog, Phil Lesh and Friends, Donna Jean Godchaux Band, 7 Walkers, Furthur, and Dead & Company. Members of other jam bands often perform together in various configurations and supergroups, such as Tedeschi Trucks Band, Oysterhead, and Dave Matthews & Friends. A consequence of Phish's repopularization of large-scale festivals can be seen in the founding of the Bonnaroo Music Festival in 2002. This multi-band, multi-day festival which annually draws close to 100,000 music fans, started as a jam band-focused event. Over time, bands from many genres have performed at Bonnaroo, but the similarities to Phish's festivals are still apparent.

There was no clear jam-band successor after Phish's 2004 breakup. Newer bands such as STS9, Disco Biscuits, and Umphrey's McGee grew their fanbase. No upcoming jam band has yet to reach the attendance levels of Phish, who themselves had never attained the peak attendance of the Grateful Dead. The long-term fragmentation of the jam-band scene has been a continuing process. Phish held a reunion concert in March 2009 at Hampton Coliseum, and again became one of the top US concert draws. The band were one of the highest-grossing touring musical artists of both 2016 and 2017, and their 13-night "Baker's Dozen" run at Madison Square Garden in 2017 grossed $15 million.

Many of today's jam bands have brought widely varied genres into the scene. A jam band festival may include bands with electronic, folk rock, blues rock, jazz fusion, psychedelic rock, southern rock, progressive rock, acid jazz, hip hop, hard rock, reggae, and bluegrass sounds. The electronic trend has been led by such bands as The Disco Biscuits, Sound Tribe Sector 9 (STS9), Lotus, EOTO, The New Deal, and Dopapod. Bands like moe., Umphrey's McGee, Lettuce, Assembly of Dust, The Heavy Pets and The Breakfast have carried on the classic rock sound mixed with exploratory jams. Members of the Grateful Dead have continued touring in many different configurations as The Dead, Bob Weir & Ratdog, Phil Lesh and Friends, 7 Walkers, Furthur, and Dead & Company. The bluegrass influence shows up in aptly named ¨Jamgrass¨ bands such as Billy Strings, Yonder Mountain String Band, Greensky Bluegrass, The Infamous Stringdusters, Railroad Earth, and Kitchen Dwellers.

The British electronic music duo Autechre was characterized as "a sort of post-human jam band" in a Pitchfork review of their 4-hour long 2016 album set elseq 1-5. Blending jam-band elements with those of electronica is known as "jamtronica" or "livetronica" (a portmanteau of the terms "live music" and "electronica"). Bands includes The Disco Biscuits, STS9 (Sound Tribe Sector 9), and The New Deal (although STS9 guitarist Hunter Brown has expressed basic reservations about the "livetronica" label, explaining that "it's a really vague term to describe a lot of bands", he did cite Tortoise as stylistic precursors). Entertainment Weekly also identified Prefuse 73, VHS or Beta, Lotus, Signal Path, MFA, and Midwest Product as notable livetronica groups.

== Jam scene ==
The contemporary jam scene has grown to encompass bands from a great diversity of musical genres. A 2000-era genre of jam-band music uses live improvisation that mimics the sounds of DJs and electronica musicians and has been dubbed "jamtronica". Progressive bluegrass, progressive rock and jazz fusion are also quite popular among fans of jam bands. In the early 2000s, the jam scene helped influence the touring patterns and approach of a new wave of indie bands like Vampire Weekend, MGMT, King Gizzard and the Lizard Wizard, Interpol, and The National.

Hundreds of jam-based festivals and concerts are held throughout the US. The Bonnaroo Music Festival, held each June in Tennessee, continues to provide a highly visible forum for jam acts, although this festival has attracted many different genres during its decade-plus history. As with other music scenes, devout fans of jam bands are known to travel from festival to festival, often developing a family-like community. These committed fan groups are often referred to by the derogatory terms "wookies" or "wooks".

== Taping ==
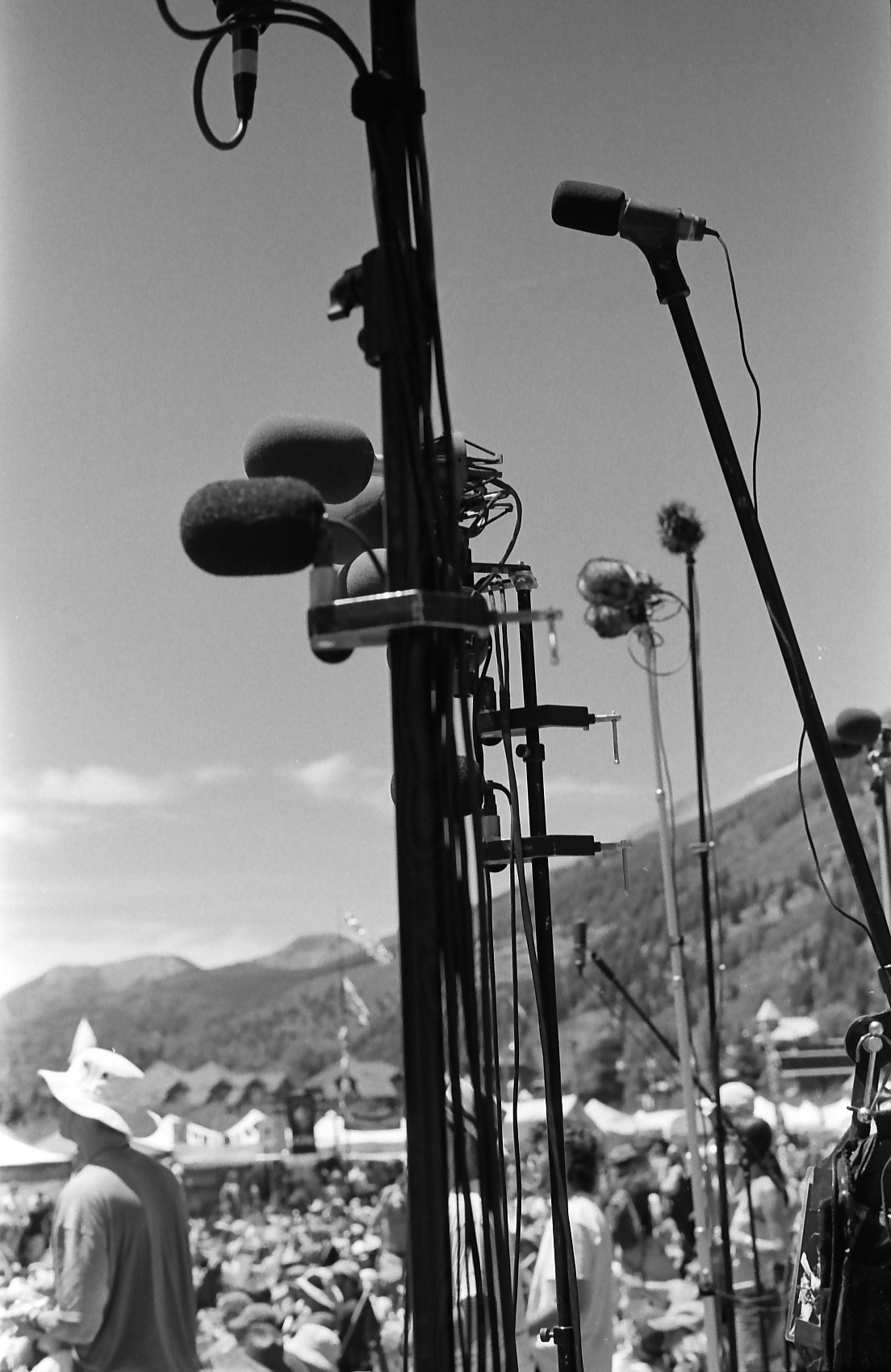
A forest of microphone stands at a taper section at Telluride Bluegrass Festival in June 2007.

Jam bands often allow their fans to record their live shows, a practice which many other musical genres view as "illegal bootlegging". The Grateful Dead encouraged this practice, which helped to create a thriving scene around the collecting and trading of recordings of their live performances. Starting in 1984, the band recognized the fact that people were already "unofficially" taping their shows, so they started to sell taper tickets for a taper's section, segregating these people with their equipment into one area of the venue to keep them from interfering with other concertgoers.

Improvisational jam bands perform their songs differently at each performance and generally have no fixed setlist, to encourage fans to see them on multiple nights. Some fans collect versions of their favourite songs and actively debate which is the best version of any particular song, keeping lists of notable versions. This may extend to the song's relative rarity in setlists of differing eras. Some bands will play on this anticipation by adding little "teases" into their sets. For example, playing a few bars of a famous cover song or hinting at a popular jam and then either never getting around to actually playing the song, or coming back to it after an extended jam. The use of segues to blend strings of songs is another mark of a jam band, and one which makes for sought-after tapes.

=== Music downloading ===
By the 2000s, as internet downloading of MP3 music files became common, the downloading of jam-band songs became an extension of the cassette taping trend. Archived jam-band downloads are available at various websites, the most prominent ones being etree and the Live Music Archive, which is part of the Internet Archive.

Some jam bands distribute their latest shows online. Bands such as Phish, Widespread Panic, The String Cheese Incident, Gov't Mule, əkoostik hookah, Umphrey's McGee, Dopapod, Lotus, and The Disco Biscuits have offered digital downloads within days, or sometimes hours, of concerts. The Grateful Dead have begun to offer live releases from their archives for download.

Some concert venues offer kiosks where fans may purchase a digital recording of the concert and download it to a USB flash drive or another portable digital storage device. Some bands offer concert recordings made available for purchase on compact disc or flash drive shortly after the show ends. Most major music festivals also offer digital live recordings at the event. Several vendors such as Instant Live by Live Nation and Aderra offer this remote recording service for instant delivery. Although these shows are freely traded in digital format, "official" versions are collected by fans for the graphics, liner notes, and packaging.

== Venues and festivals ==
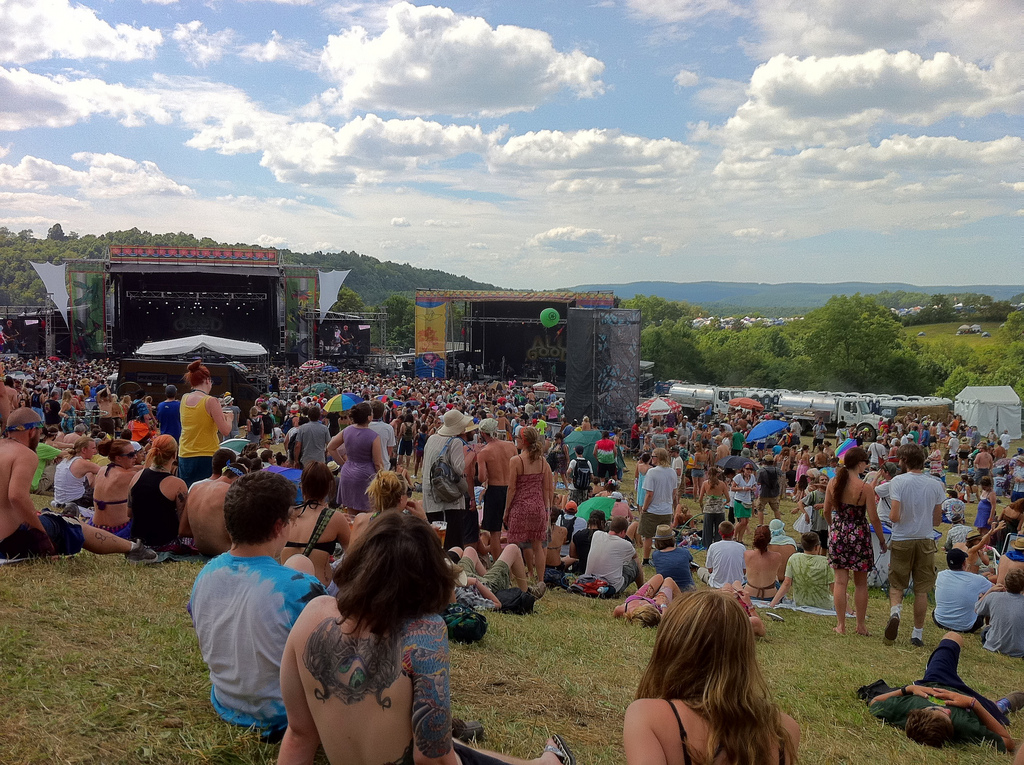
All Good Music Festival, July 2011

In the August 2006 issue of Guitar One on jam bands, the following places were referred to as the "best places to see jam music": Red Rocks Amphitheatre, Red Rocks Park, Denver, CO; The Gorge Amphitheatre, George, Washington; High Sierra Music Festival, Quincy, CA; Saratoga Performing Arts Center, Saratoga Springs, NY; The Greek Theater, Berkeley, CA; Bonnaroo Music Festival (Bonnaroo has become increasingly mainstream in recent years, and has seen a shift in fan base), Manchester, TN; The Warfield Theater, San Francisco, California; Higher Ground, Burlington, Vermont, Nelson Ledges Quarry Park, Garrettsville, Ohio; and the Jam in the Dam in Amsterdam.

One way to see many jam bands in one place is by going to a jam band-oriented music festival. Some popular festivals that include jam bands are: Bonnaroo Music Festival in Manchester, Tennessee; Gathering of the Vibes in Bridgeport, Connecticut; Rothbury Festival in Rothbury, Michigan (now known as Electric Forest Festival); High Sierra Music Festival in Quincy, California; All Good Music Festival; The Peach Music Festival in Scranton, PA; Mountain Jam (festival) in Hunter Mt, New York; Telluride Bluegrass Festival in Colorado; Lockn' Festival in Arrington, Virginia; The Werk Out Music Festival in Thornville, Ohio; and Summer Camp Music Festival in Chillicothe, Illinois.

== Business model and copyright law ==
Law professor Mark Schultz found that jam bands had fundamentally different business models from the mainstream music industry. This could be seen in the perceptions of their fans: Jam-band fans view themselves and the band as part of a shared community, which the band management serves. In comparison, fans of mainstream music "often portray band management as part of a ruthless industry that ... mistreats fans and musicians alike".

Professor Tom R. Tyler considered the main law-enforcement strategies for copyright protection, finding that deterrence and process-based strategies could both be effective, but that the latter was more efficient.

Jam bands encourage fans to bring recording equipment to live performances and give away copies of what they record. This practice may increase the sizes of their audiences and the total revenue received from concerts and the sale of recorded music. The fans reciprocate the generosity of the jam bands by helping enforce the copyright rules that the bands write, consistent with Tyler's "process-based" law enforcement. Schultz said the Recording Industry Association of America (RIAA) seems to call most fans pirates intent on stealing their music.

Schultz said that the key concept here is reciprocity: Fans treated with generosity and respect by jam bands tend to be more loyal even to the point of helping enforce the copyrights the jam bands claim. Fans similarly reciprocate the hostility they perceive in the anti-piracy lawsuits filed by the mainstream recording industry. It is unclear which business model is most remunerative for music industry managers, but Schultz insisted that jam bands tend to have more loyal fans, and the mainstream music industry might benefit from following this model and treating their fans with more respect.

== See also ==
- Deadhead
- Jerry Garcia
- Monterey Pop Festival (1967)
- Woodstock (1969)
- Altamont Free Concert (1969)
- Isle of Wight Festival
- Psychedelic rock
- Jammy Award
- List of jam bands
- List of jam band music festivals
