= Gathering of the Vibes =

American music festival (1996–2015)

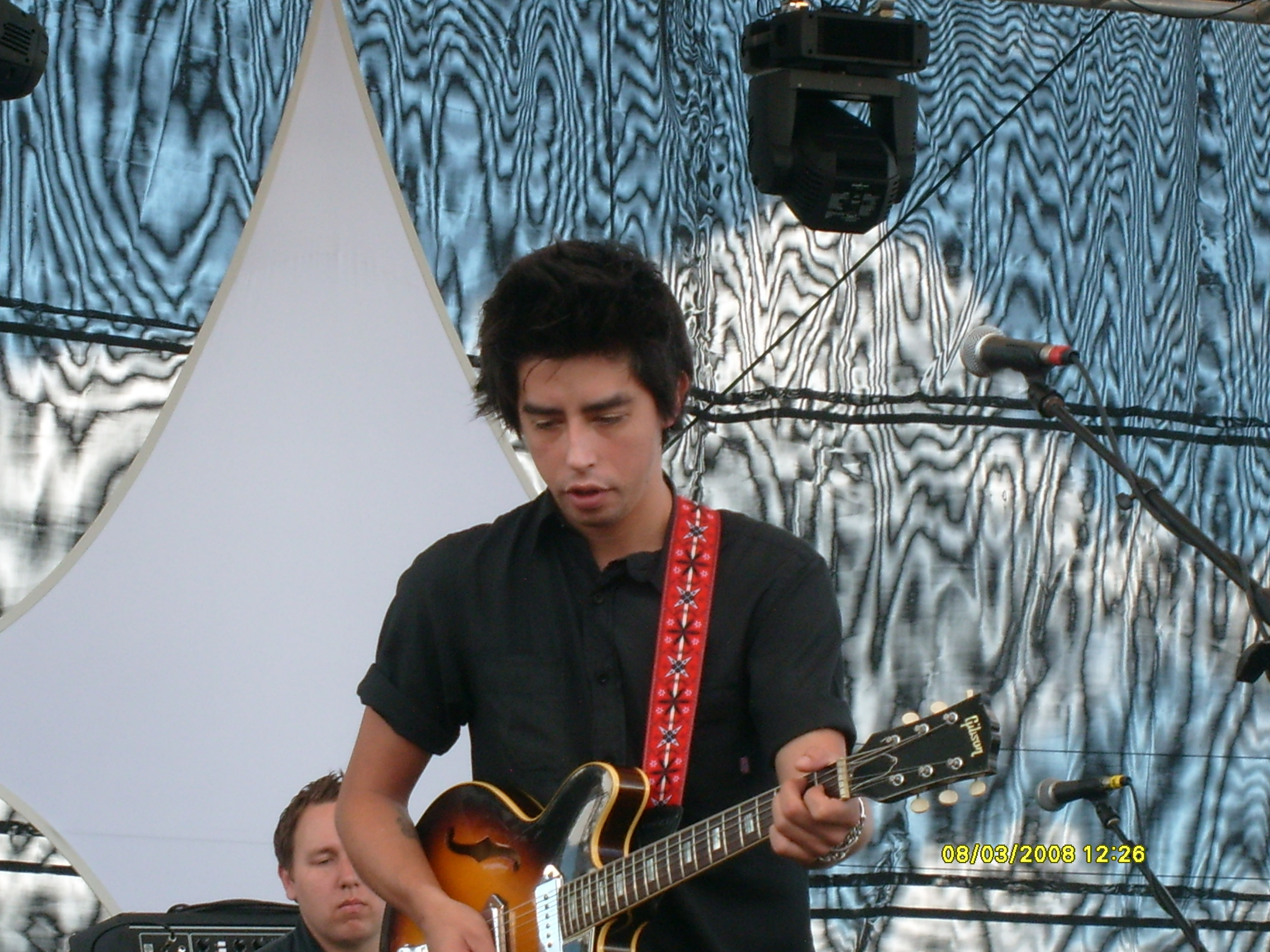
- Genre: Jam bands, alternative rock, jazz, americana, bluegrass, country, folk, gospel, reggae
- Locations: Bridgeport, Connecticut, US; Mariaville, New York, US; Red Hook, New York, US; Plattsburgh, New York, US; Croton-on-Hudson, New York, US; Purchase, New York, US
- Years active: 1996 - 2015
- Website: Official Website

Gathering of the Vibes (often abbreviated as GOTV) was an annual four-day music, camping and arts festival that celebrated the Grateful Dead and showcased a diverse variety of music. Over the course of the event, styles would often include funk, bluegrass, rock, jam band, jazz, reggae, R&B and folk music. Beginning in 1996, GOTV brought many bands to the New England area during the summer season. There existed two main stages which would alternate bands so that festival-goers could experience music all day and into the night. A short stroll down the beach was the "Green Vibes Stage", which showcased some of the Northeast's finest talent.

In addition to music, festival goers had access to food and beverage vendors, a variety of both handmade crafts and imported goods along the "Craft Vendor Row" that was known as Shakedown Street, and which was highlighted by and many types of vendors, an Art Gallery, along with Vibes merchandise. The Vibes also showcased non-profit organizations in a Non-Profit "Village" with an emphasis on local groups. Information and demonstrations included everything from environmental awareness to social consciousness. Beginning in 1999, The Vibes also hosted an annual non-perishable food and hygiene product drive to benefit a local food bank.

On November 27, 2015, it was announced that Gathering of the Vibes would not take place in 2016, though it was stated that the festival planned to return in 2017. This did not occur, however, and it appears that 2015 was the last gathering.

== History ==
In 1996, the year after Grateful Dead frontman Jerry Garcia died, Sally Ansorge Mulvey and John Dwork (publishers of the Grateful Dead Fanzine "Dupree's Diamond News") and Ken Hays (of Terrapin Tapes) threw a memorial party for Garcia at SUNY Purchase named "Deadhead Heaven - A Gathering of the Tribe." In 1997, Hays continued the festival and relocated it to Croton Point Park, NY and it was renamed "Gathering of the Vibes."

=== 1996 ===
SUNY Purchase, Purchase, New York, May 24–26, Originally named "Deadhead Heaven: A Gathering of the Tribe."

Artist Lineup:
Jazz Mandolin Project, Max Creek, moe., Ominous Seapods, Somah, Solar Circus, Stone Cold, Strangefolk, Voices of Joy, Zen Tricksters

=== 1997 ===
Croton Point Park, Croton-on-Hudson, New York, Also the name of the festival was changed from Deadhead Heaven to "The Gathering of The Vibes"

Artist Lineup:
Agents of Good Roots ~ Charlie Hunter Quartet, David Gans & Friends ~ Deep Banana Blackout ~ God Street Wine ~ Hubinger St ~ Jazz Mandolin Project ~ Jeh Kulu Dance & Drum Theater ~ Kevin Hays Trio ~ Laughin' Bones ~ Max Creek ~ Moon Boot Lover ~ New Brown Hat ~ Ominous Seapods ~ Position 17 ~ Percy Hill ~ Strangefolk ~ Warren Haynes ~ Zen Tricksters

=== 1998 ===
June 19–21 Plattsburgh, New York, 16 miles from the Canada–US border.

Artist Lineup:
Conehead Buddah ~ Deep Banana Blackout ~ The Disco Biscuits ~ Ekoostik Hookah ~ Fat Mama ~ Gordon Stone Trio ~ Gov't Mule ~ Jazz Mandolin Project ~ Jeh Kulu Dance & Drum Theater ~ Late night Terrapin Jam ~ Max Creek ~ Michael Ray & The Cosmic Krewe ~ moe. ~ Ominous Seapods ~ Percy Hill ~ South Catherine St. Jug Band ~ Strangefolk ~ Zen Tricksters

=== 1999 ===
June 18 - June 20 @ Seaside Park, Bridgeport, Connecticut

Artist Lineup:
Deep Banana Blackout ~ Gov't Mule ~ Jazz Mandolin Project ~ John Scofield Band ~ Max Creek ~ Merl Saunders Trio ~ moe. ~ Percy Hill ~ Schoolhouse Rock ~ Strangefolk ~ The Big Wu, ~ The Disco Biscuits ~ The Radiators ~ The Slip ~ Viperhouse ~ Zen Tricksters

=== 2000 ===
June 23 - June 25 @ Seaside Park, Bridgeport, Connecticut

Artist Lineup:
David Grisman Quintet ~ Deep Banana Blackout ~ Dennis McNally ~ Gibb Droll ~ Gordon Stone Band ~ Harlem Gospel Choir ~ John Scofield Band ~ Joules Graves ~ Les Claypool and the Rat Brigade ~ Max Creek ~ Merl Saunders and Friends ~ moe. ~ Original P ~ Percy Hill ~ Peter Prince ~ RatDog ~ Schleigho ~ Schoolhouse Rock ~ Sonia Dada ~ Soulive ~ Sound Tribe Sector 9 ~ Strangefolk ~ Tony Trischka ~ Trans Global Millinium Ensemble ~ Upright Citizens Brigade ~ Walter "Wolfman" Washington ~ Warren Haynes ~ Zen Tricksters

Notes:
with the first appearance from Grateful Dead guitarist, now of RatDog fame, Bob Weir

=== 2001 ===
June 29 - July 2 @ Red Hook, New York
30 Year Tribute to Hendrix/Joplin/Morrison.

Artist Lineup:
Addison Groove Project ~ BareBones and WildFlowers ~ Blue Floyd ~ Bruce Hornsby ~ Deep Banana Blackout ~ Dickey Betts Band ~ Disco Biscuits ~ Femi Kuti ~ Grapes of Vaudevillian Fantasy ~ Jacob Fred Jazz Odyssey ~ Jiggle ~ Joanne Shenandoah ~ John Scofield Band ~ Joules Graves ~ Lake Trout ~ Les Claypool's Frog Brigade ~ Max Creek ~ Medeski, Martin and Wood ~ Merl Saunders and his Funky Friends ~ Murali Coryell ~ Organically Grown Gospel Choir ~ Ray Manzarek ~ Rafter Bats ~ Robert Randolph ~ Sloan Wainwright ~ Soulive ~ Steve Kimock Band ~ Strangefolk ~ Terrapin Thirty Year Jam ~ Tom Tom Club ~ Topaz ~ Ulu ~ Uncle Sammy ~ Upright Citizens Brigade and Friends ~ Wild Magnolias ~ Zen Tricksters

=== 2002 ===
July 4 - July 7 @ Indian Lookout Country Club, Mariaville, New York

Artist Lineup:
Aaron Katz Band ~ Andrew Gromiller ~ Bomb Squad ~ Carl Big Heart ~ Deep Banana Blackout ~ Deni Bonet ~ Fuzz and Stephen Kellogg ~ Gov't Mule ~ Grapes of Vaudevillian Fantasy ~ Jess Klein ~ John Mooney ~ Lake Trout ~ Les Claypool ~ Lightnin' Wells ~ Lucy Chapin ~ Max Creek ~ MoFro ~ NRBQ ~ Peter Prince ~ Phil Lesh and Friends ~ Rafter Bats ~ Reid Genauer ~ Robert Kowal ~ Soulive ~ Steve Kimock Band ~ Strangefolk ~ Third World ~ Waking Dream ~ Warren Haynes ~ Wavy Gravy ~ Zen Tricksters

Notes:
Phil Lesh's first appearance.

=== 2003 ===
July 10 – July 13 @ Indian Lookout Country Club, Mariaville, New York
GOTV with the Allman Brothers Band and James Brown

Artist Lineup:
Addison Groove Project ~ Allman Brothers Band ~ Andrew Gromiller ~ Bomb Squad ~ Dan Bern ~ David Grisman Quintet ~ Deep Banana Blackout ~ Derek Trucks Band ~ Dickey Betts and Great Southern ~ Gov't Mule ~ Holmes Brothers ~ James Brown ~ Jim Donovan Rhythm and Drum ~ Jorma Kaukonen and Blue Country ~ Karl Denson's Tiny Universe ~ Keller Williams ~ Max Creek ~ Michael Franti and Spearhead ~ Nerissa & Katryna Nields ~ Oak Street Jam Band~Particle ~ Peter Prince ~ Rafter Bats ~ Raisinhill ~ Reed Foehl ~ Reid Genauer and the Assembly of Dust ~ Rusted Root ~ Strangefolk ~ Susan Tedeschi ~ Waking Puppets ~ Warren Haynes ~ Wavy Gravy ~ Zen Tricksters

=== 2004 ===
July 15 - July 17 @ Indian Lookout Country Club, Mariaville, New York

Artist Lineup:
Assembly of Dust, Benevento/Russo Duo, Bomb Squad, Dark Star Orchestra, Martin Sexton, Masters of Bluegrass, Masters of Funk, Rafter Bats, Scarecrow Collection, Steve Kimock Band, Strangefolk, The Breakfast, The Radiators, The Slip, U-Melt, Zen Tricksters

Notes:
Featured Masters of Funk and Masters of Bluegrass

=== 2005 ===
August 12 - August 14 @ Indian Lookout Country Club, Mariaville, New York
Special 10 Year Anniversary of Jerry Garcia's death, with performances by Bob Weir and an "all-star tribute" jam with the Dark Star Orchestra, Reid Genauer and Keller Williams.

Artist Lineup:
Assembly of Dust, Church, Dark Star Orchestra, David Gans, Deep Banana Blackout, Del McCoury Band, Depth Quartet, Jazz Mandolin Project, John Brown's Body, John Scofield, Jonah Smith, Juggling Suns, Keller Williams, Leo Nocentilli, Medeski Martin and Wood, New Deal, Ominous Seapods, Rafter Bats, Railroad Earth, RAQ, Ratdog, Ryan Montbleau Band, Scarecrow Collection, Stephen Kellogg and the Sixers, Tribute to Jerry Garcia, Wavy Gravy, Windfalls, Zen Tricksters, Zox

=== 2006 ===
August 17 - August 20 @ Indian Lookout Country Club, Mariaville, New York

Artist Lineup:
Assembly of Dust, Bud & Budd, The Kind Buds, Burning Spear, Chuch, David Gans, Deep Banana Blackout, Everyone Orchestra, G. Love and Special Sauce, Hot Tuna, Juggling Suns, Keller Williams, Kettle Joe's Psychedelic Swamp Review, King For A Day, Martin Sexton, New Riders of the Purple Sage, North Mississippi Allstars, Papa Mali, Rafter Bats, Ratdog, Rhythm Devils, Ryan Montbleau, Scarecrow Collection, Strangefolk, Tea Leaf Green, Walter "Wolfman" Washington, Wavy Gravy, Yonder Mountain String Band, Zero

Notes:
Bob Weir sat-in during Keller's set, played with Jorma Kaukonen and Jack Casady, and also jammed with Mickey Hart and Bill Kreutzmann's Rhythm Devils which featured Steve Kimock on guitar and Phish's Mike Gordon on bass.]

=== 2007 ===
August 9 - August 12 @ Seaside Park, Bridgeport, Connecticut

Artist Lineup:
Assembly of Dust, Bindlestiff Family Circus, Bob Weir & RatDog, Bomb Squad, Boris Garcia, Brothers Grim, Bud & Budd, The Kind Buds, Buddy Guy, Christopher Robin Band, Chuch, Clip, Corkscrew, Cosmic Jibaros, Darian Cunning, Dark Star Orchestra, David Gans, Deep Banana Blackout, Depth Quartet, Dickey Betts & Great Southern, Dirty Dozen Brass Band, Donna Jean & The Tricksters, Electric Hil, Fro, Fungus Amungus, George Clinton and Parliament Funkadelic, HOE, Hubinger Street, Jay Stollman, Jen Durkin's Equinox, John Brown's Body, Juggling Suns, Keller and the Keels, Kevin Hays Jazz Session, King For A Day, Larissa Delorenzo, Les Claypool, Los Lobos, Manchado, Martin Sexton, Mickey Hart Band, Nardy Boy, Railroad Earth, Roamer, Rolla, Ryan Montbleau Band, Scarecrow Collection, Strangefolk, Tea Leaf Green, U-Melt, The Wailers, Wavy Gravy, Zero

Notes:
With a Thursday night Jerry Garcia celebration led by Dark Star Orchestra and a Friday night tribute to James Brown led by George Clinton & P-Funk, Deep Banana Blackout and Guests.

=== 2008 ===
July 31 - August 3 @ Seaside Park, Bridgeport, Connecticut

Artist Lineup:
Alternate Routes, American Babies, Assembly of Dust, Bill Kreutzmann Trio, The Black Crowes, Bud & Budd, Dark Star Orchestra, David Gans, Deep Banana Blackout, Derek Trucks & Susan Tedeschi, Donna Jean & The Tricksters, Jackie Greene Band, The Kind Buds, King For A Day, Mike Gordon, Neville Brothers, New Riders of the Purple Sage, The Organically Grown Gospel Choir, Phil Lesh & Friends, Porter Batiste Stoltz, Ryan Montbleau Band, Sam Bush, Strangefolk, Taj Mahal Trio, Umphrey's Mcgee, Zappa Plays Zappa, Graylight Campfire

Notes:
Thursday night was a tribute to the life and times of Jerry Garcia led by Dark Star Orchestra and Donna Jean & The Tricksters

=== 2009 ===
July 23 - July 26 @ Seaside Park, Bridgeport, Connecticut

Artist Lineup:
Assembly of Dust, Big Moon, Bob Weir & RatDog, Buddy Guy, Crosby, Stills & Nash, Dark Star Orchestra, Deep Banana Blackout, Donna Jean Godchaux Band, George Clinton & P-Funk, Grace Potter & The Nocturnals, Guster, Harlem Gospel Choir, JJ Grey & MOFRO, John Brown's Body, Keller Williams with Moseley, Droll & Sipe, King For A Day, Lettuce, Levon Helm Band, The Machine, Max Creek, Moe, Moonalice, Perpetual Groove, P. J. Pacifico, Ryan Montbleau Band, Strangefolk, Bud & Budd, The Kind Buds, Reckoning

Notes:
State Radio was scheduled to appear but canceled at the last minute. Bob Weir sat-in with the Levon Helm Band. Donna Jean Godchaux sat in with Keller Williams, Max Creek and Bob Weir & RatDog. moe's set was cut short after seven songs due to inclement weather, as was Crosby, Stills & Nash, and Bud & Budd. The Kind Buds played in the VIP Tent late night Saturday after Bob Weir & RatDog.

=== 2010 ===
July 29 - Aug 1 @ Seaside Park, Bridgeport, Connecticut

Artist Lineup:
Assembly of Dust, Big Sam's Funky Nation, Damian Marley & Nas, Dark Star Orchestra, Deep Banana Blackout, Donna Jean Godchaux Band, Furthur, Galactic, Harlem Gospel Choir, Jackie Greene Band, Jimmy Cliff, Little Feat, Bronze Radio Return, Martin Sexton featuring Ryan Montbleau, Max Creek, Mix Master Mike, New Riders of the Purple Sage, Primus, The Radiators, Rhythm Devils featuring Keller Williams, Robert Randolph & The Family Band, Sharon Jones & The Dap-Kings, Steve Kimock Crazy Engine, Umphrey's McGee, Zach Deputy

=== 2011 ===
July 21–24 @ Seaside Park, Bridgeport, Connecticut

Artist Lineup:

Assembly of Dust, Dark Star Orchestra, Deep Banana Blackout, Dr. John & Lower 911, Elvis Costello, Furthur, Ivan Neville's Dumpstaphunk, Jane's Addiction, John Butler Trio, Levon Helm, McLovins, moe, Ryan Montbleau, Taj Mahal Trio, Tea Leaf Green, Tedeschi Trucks Band, Toots & Maytals, Big Gigantic, New Mastersounds, Rhythm Devils, Big Sam's Funky Nation, Dr. John & the Lower 911, Sister Sparrow & the Dirty Birds, Primate Fiasco, Caravan of Thieves, Giant Panda Guerrilla Dub Squad, The Infamous Stringdusters

=== 2012 ===
July 19–22 @ Seaside Park, Bridgeport, Connecticut

Artist Lineup:

Primus, Phil Lesh and Friends, Bob Weir & Bruce Hornsby with special guest Branford Marsalis, STS9, 7 Walkers Featuring Bill Kreutzmann, Mickey Hart Band, Strangefolk Reunion, Yonder Mountain String Band, Steel Pulse, Zappa Plays Zappa, The Avett Brothers, The Greyboy All Stars, George Porter Jr. & Runnin' Panders, Keller Williams, Dark Star Orchestra, Mates of State, Deep Banana Blackout, ALO, Ryan Montbleau Band, Max Creek, Assembly of Dust, Zach Deputy, Kung Fu, Joe Pug, Toubab Krewe, The Stepkids, Outernational, Bad Rabbits, David Gans, The McLovins, Dangermuffin & Yarn, Dopapod, Cosmic Jibaros, TWIDDLE, Band Together, Andy The Music Man, Lucid, The Primate Fiasco, Quincy Mumford and The Reason Why, MIZ, School of Rock Teen Vibes Stage, Royal Family Ball featuring Soulive and Lettuce, Conspirator, Gigantic Underground Conspiracy, The Machine, Papadosio, Graylight Campfire, ConectIcon

Master of Ceremony: Wavy Gravy

=== 2013 ===
July 25–28 @ Seaside Park, Bridgeport, Connecticut

Artist Lineup:

Phil Lesh and Friends featuring John Scofield, John Medeski, Joe Russo and John Kadlecik (2 nights), Gov't Mule, The Black Crowes, Tedeschi Trucks Band, Grace Potter & The Nocturnals, The Roots, Funky Meters, John Butler Trio, Galactic, Dark Star Orchestra, John Scofield Uberjam, Original Strangefolk, Railroad Earth, Wild Adriatic, Fishbone, Assembly of Dust, Max Creek, The Kind Buds, Ryan Montbleau Band, Lord Huron, The Revivalists, Tribal Seeds, The Nigel Hall Band, David Gans, McLovins, Band Together, Lukas Nelson & P.O.T.R., Cosmic Jibaros, Borboletta: A Tribute to Santana, Jimkata, Andy the Music Man, Consider The Source, Blues Traveler

Master of Ceremonies: Wavy Gravy

Late Night: Deep Banana Blackout, Papadosio, Kung Fu & Dojo Allstars, DJ Sets by James Murphy (LCD Soundsystem), and Rob Garza (Thievery Corporation), Silent Disco

=== 2014 ===
July 31-August 3 @ Seaside Park, Bridgeport, Connecticut

Artist Lineup:

Widespread Panic, John Fogerty, The Disco Biscuits feat. Mickey Hart and Bill Kreutzmann, Dispatch, Lotus: Talking Heads Deconstructed, Edward Sharpe and the Magnetic Zeros, Umphrey's McGee, moe., Slightly Stoopid, Ziggy Marley, Maceo Parker, Rodrigo y Gabriela, Dumpstaphunk, Allen Stone, Trombone Shorty & Orleans Avenue, Dark Star Orchestra, Joe Russo's Almost Dead, Leftover Salmon, Keller Williams' Grateful Grass featuring Jeff Austin & Reed Mathis, Rusted Root, Ryan Montbleau & Friends, Stanley Jordan, Strangefolk, Langhorne Slim & The Law, White Denim, Kung Fu, Assembly of Wine, Bronze Radio Return, Crash, American Babies, Twiddle, Donna The Buffalo, Orgone, Nahko and Medicine for the People, Barefoot Truth, Love Canon, The Main Squeeze, McLovins, David Gans, The Primate Fiasco, Band Together CT, Funky Dawgz Brass Band, Cosmic Dust Bunnies, Banooba, Andy the Music Man, School of Rock All Stars, World Peace Ceremony, The Brummy Brothers

Master of Ceremonies: Wavy Gravy

Late Night: Deep Banana Blackout, EOTO, Karl Denson's Tiny Universe, Digital Tape Machine, Dopapod, Silent Disco

=== 2015 ===
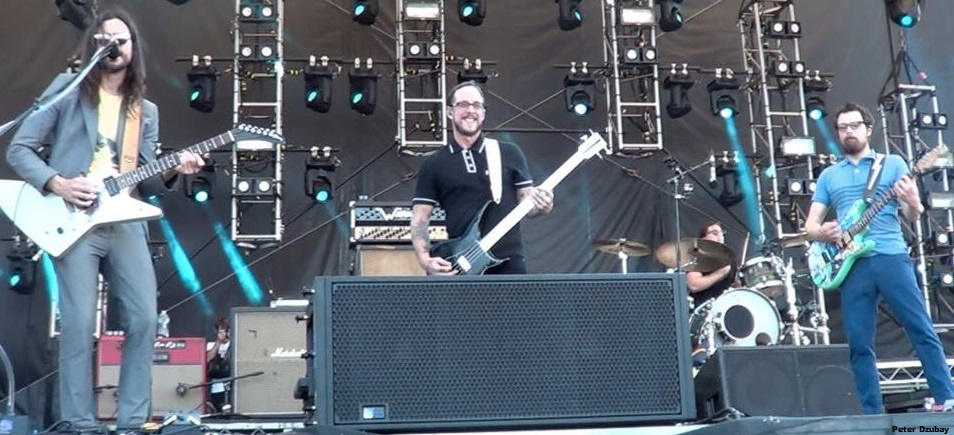
Weezer performing at the 2015 festival

Artist Lineup:

Warren Haynes and the Seaside All-Stars (Featuring George Porter Jr, Branford Marsalis, Jackie Greene, Joe Russo, Marco Benevento & Friends), The String Cheese Incident (With Special Guests David Grisman, Peter Rowan & Friends), Wilco, Ben Harper & The Innocent Criminals, Weezer, Gregg Allman, Warren Haynes (Featuring Railroad Earth), Tedeschi Trucks Band, Billy & The Kids, Sharon Jones & The Dap-Kings, The Gaslight Anthem, The Word, Zappa Plays Zappa, Dark Star Orchestra Featuring Melvin Seals, Greensky Bluegrass, Preservation Hall Jazz Band, Tea Leaf Green, Deep Banana Blackout, John Brown's Body, Kung Fu, Twiddle, Max Creek, Jaimoe's Jasssz Band, Strangefolk, Turkuaz, Doyle Bramhall II, New Riders of the Purple Sage, Ryan Montbleau, Cabinet, Trevor Hall, Bombino, Moon Hooch, Earphunk, The Primate Fiasco, Banooba, Nattali Rize & Notis, Band Together, Fly Golden Eagle, The Maniac Agenda on the Slience Disco Beach stage David Gans, World Peace Flag Ceremony

Master of Ceremonies: Wavy Gravy

Late Night: Karl Denson's Tiny Universe, Lettuce, Electron, The Nth Power

=== 2016 ===
After the 20th Anniversary Vibes in 2015, the organizers decided to take a year break, using the time to plan ahead and envision how the event could continue to grow in a fun and exciting way. Gathering of the Vibes said they planned to return in 2017.

=== 2017 ===
On January 31, 2017, a message posted by the Gathering of the Vibes retracted their previous statement and stated that they "made the difficult decision not to move forward with Gathering of the Vibes in 2017."

== See also ==
- List of jam band music festivals
