= The Backyard Committee =

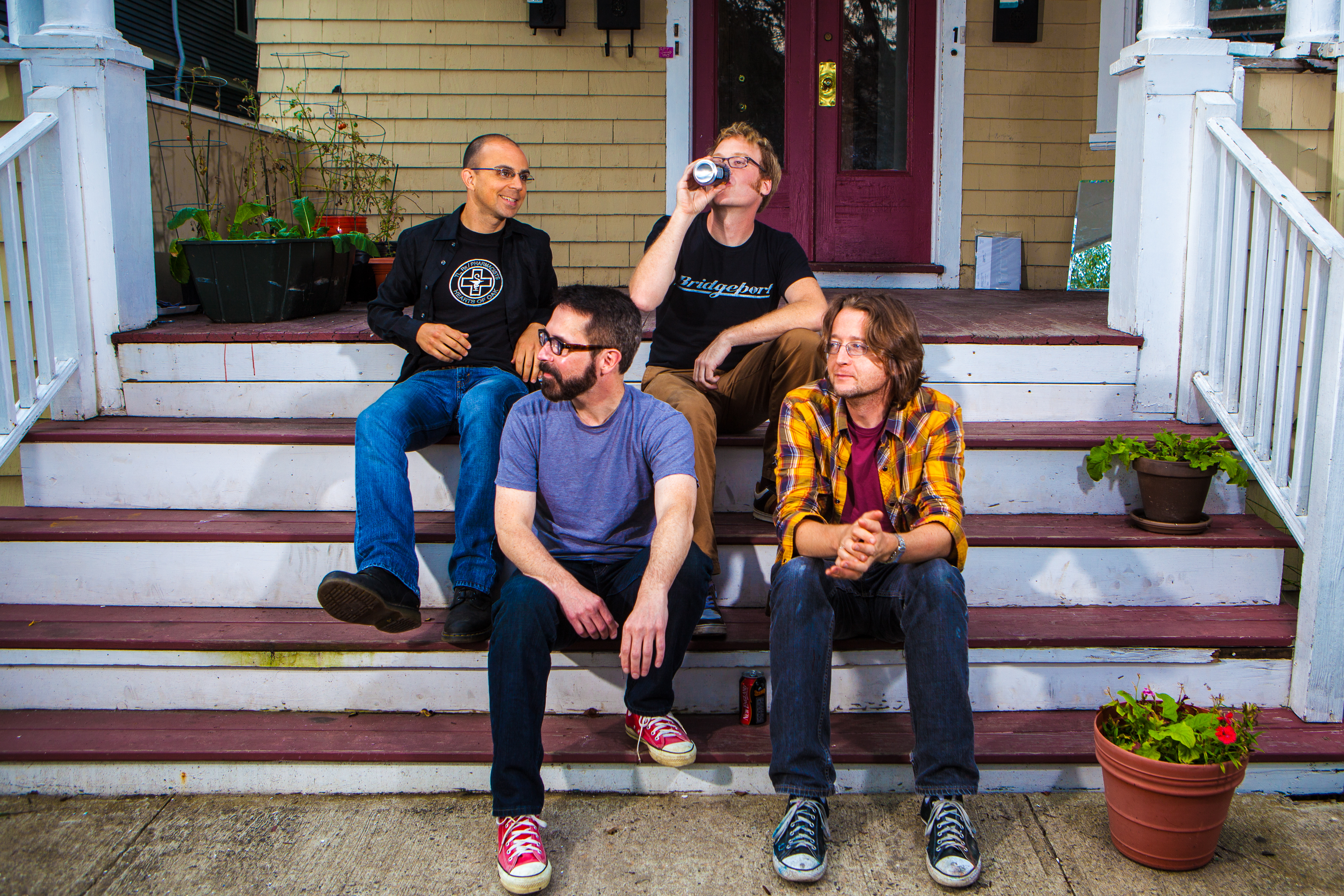
- The Backyard Committee in Sept. 2012. Photo by Kelly Jensen.

Background information
- Origin: New Haven, Connecticut, Connecticut, United States
- Genres: Psychedelic, jam band, indie rock
- Years active: 2010–present
- Members: Mike Sembos; Eric Donnelly; Tim Walsh; Nick D'Errico; Chris Cavaliere
- Website: Official website

The Backyard Committee (BYC) is a band from New Haven, Connecticut that plays melodic roots rock injected with moments of improvisation and experimentation, much in the spirit of the Grateful Dead, Neil Young, and Bob Dylan, but with indie rock influences like Guided By Voices, Pavement, and Neutral Milk Hotel. Mike Sembos (vocals, guitar or bass) writes the songs and then serves as the editor of the project. His rotating cast of musicians are encouraged to play their instruments using their own ideas and their own voices to make each lineup and each show unique.

Sembos formerly played guitar and then bass with The Alternate Routes, a group that has toured the U.S. numerous times, performed on "Late Night with Conan O'Brien" and "Mountain Stage", and played festivals including Gathering of the Vibes and Mountain Jam.

Sembos has studied bass with Carol Kaye of the Wrecking Crew.

The Backyard Committee has shared stages with the likes of The Felice Brothers, Miracle Legion, American Babies, Crooked Fingers, Sean Hayes, Sarah Borges & the Broken Singles, Jesse Malin, The Ryan Montbleau Band, and Califone.

== Discography ==
- The Backyard Committee (2010)
- Festival (2013)
- Plains (2017)
- Mountains (2017)
- Surf Hotel Ghosts (2020)

== Album reviews ==
"Whatever ineffable attributes Sembos brings to the Alternate Routes, there's no mistaking what he has done with the Backyard Committee: He's made an inviting album of songs that linger after the last note fades," says Eric Danton of the Hartford Courant.

John H. of CT Indie praised the albums production, noting that the instrumentation complements the vocals. He compared the album's ethereal undertones to the work of Daniel Lanois, while noting it retains a minimalist folk style reminiscent of Rick Rubin. Specially, John H. highlighted the single-coil guitar distortion on "Once in a Blue," the atmospheric organ arrangement on "So Long Ago" which he contrasted with Jeff Tweedy's cleaner production styles and the prominent low-end piano tones on "Winter Trip," comparing the latter to Johnny Cash's American IV.

"The end result is a sort of jam-session garage band you’d actually want to sit and listen to–like somewhere in Connecticut is this bunch of musician neighbors that get together for a barbecue or something, and actually sound really, really good," says Jeff McQ of the Oomph Music Blog.
