= 2013 Bonnaroo Music Festival =

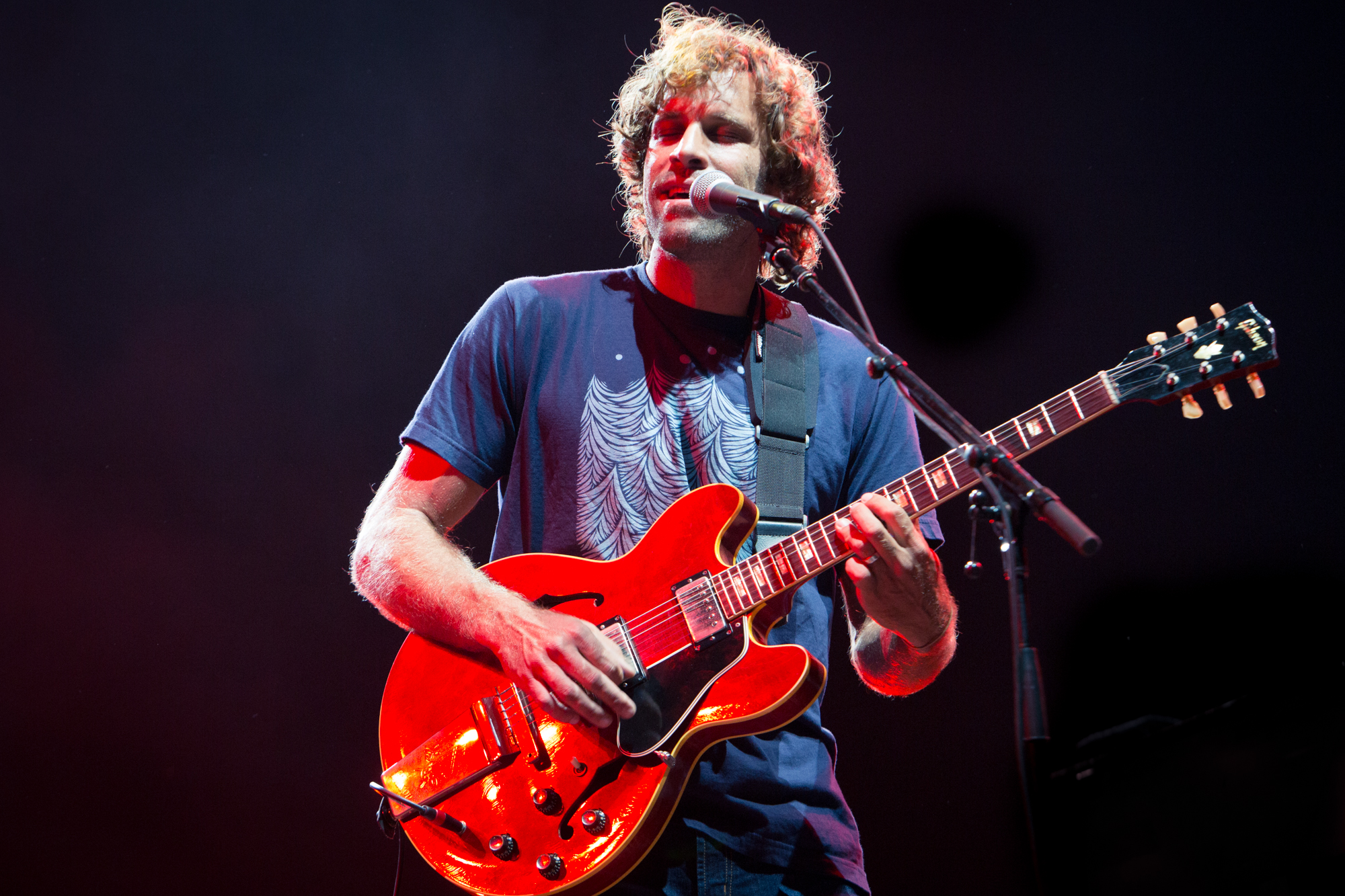
Jack Johnson performed as a headliner following Mumford & Sons' cancellation.

The 2013 Bonnaroo Music Festival was held June 13–16, 2013 in Manchester, Tennessee and marked the 12th time the festival has been held since its inception in 2002.

== Line-up ==
=== Thursday, June 13 ===
(artists listed from earliest to latest set times)

- This Tent:
  - Futurebirds
  - Ariel Pink
  - Deap Vally
  - Japandroids
  - Alt-J
  - The Vaccines

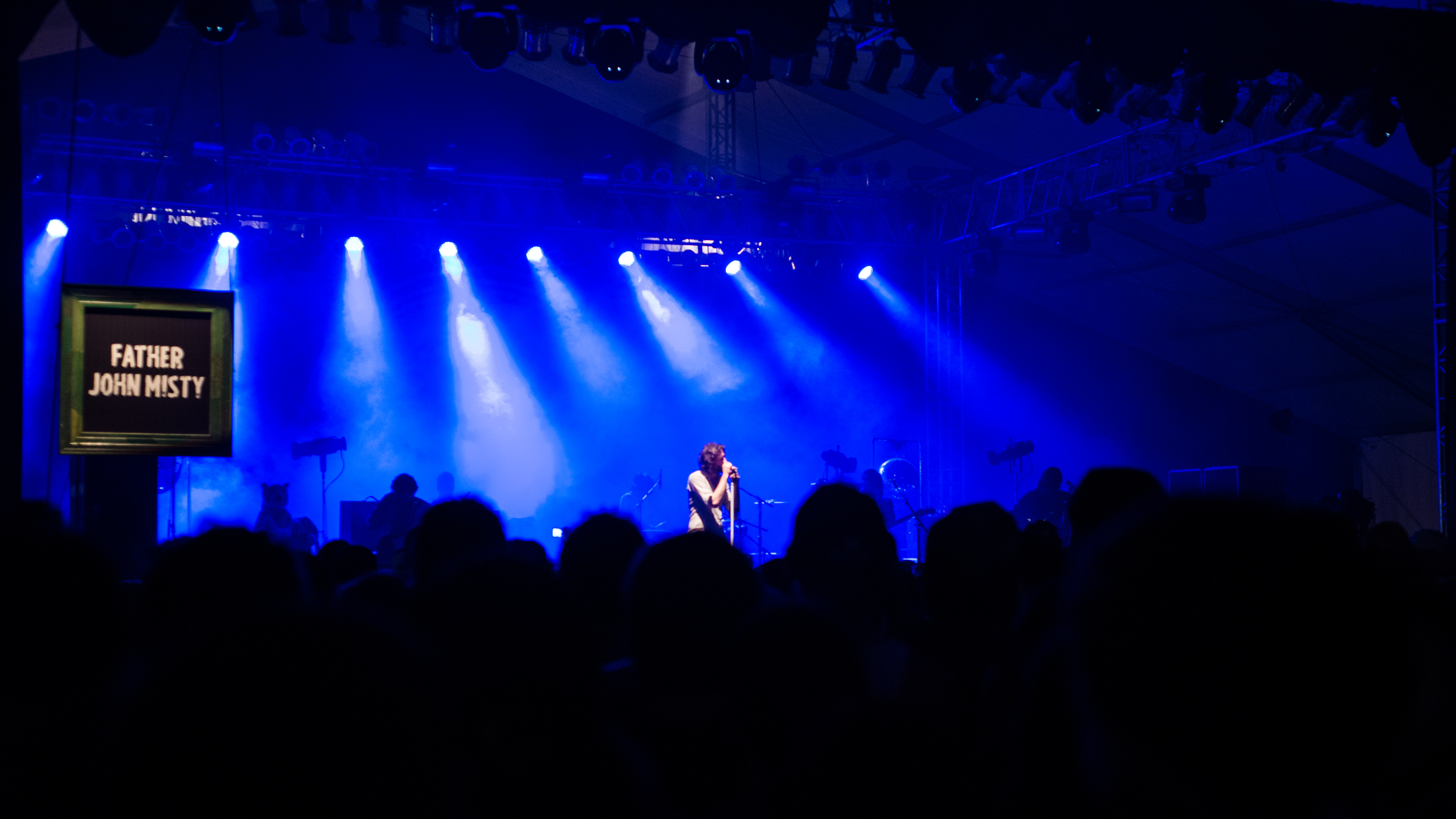
Father John Misty performed in That Tent on the opening night of the festival

- That Tent:
  - Nicki Bluhm & The Gramblers
  - Milo Greene
  - JD McPherson
  - HAIM
  - Django Django
  - Father John Misty
  - Allen Stone
  - ALO with Special Guests
- The Other Tent:
  - The Stepkids
  - Twenty One Pilots
  - Araabmuzik
  - Walk the Moon
  - Purity Ring
  - Paper Diamond
  - Killer Mike
- Bonnaroo Comedy Theatre hosted by IFC:
  - Maria Bamford featuring Kyle Dunnigan and Cristela Alonzo (2 sets)
  - Mike Birbiglia featuring Michael Che
  - Eric Andre, Nikki Glaser, Chris Gethard & Kyle Dunnigan
- New Music On Tap Lounge brewed by Miller Lite:
  - Ri¢hie
  - Johnnyswim
  - Andrew Duhon
  - Sons of Fathers
  - Houndmouth
  - Maps & Atlases
  - Jonny Fritz
  - Wake Owl
  - Capital Cities
- Silent Disco:
  - Vacationer (DJ Set)
  - Jonny Santos
  - DJ Logic
  - Sam Spiegel
  - DJ Jazzy Jeff
- Solar Stage:
  - Asian Teacher Factory
  - In Memory of Gregor Barnum: Carbon Shredding
  - The Battleholex and Friends Hip Hop Variety Show Breakdancing
  - ON an ON
  - Ogya Afrobeat
  - The Flavor Savers Beard & Mustache Contest
  - Carnivalesque Entertainment: Bellydance & Vaudeville
- Cinema Tent:
  - Sound City
  - Green Screens Presented by Rock The Earth: Revolution - Q&A with director Rob Stewart
  - Reno 911! Sheriff’s Department’s Bonnaroo Drug Safety Seminar with Lieutenant Jim Dangle and Deputy Travis Junior
  - [adult swim] presents: things you've never seen
  - NBA Finals Game 4
  - The Polyphonic Spree perform the songs of The Rocky Horror Picture Show
  - The Rocky Horror Picture Show
  - Trapped in the Closet Sing-Along – Hosted by Henri Mazza
  - Leprechaun 20th Anniversary
  - National Lampoon’s Vacation 30th Anniversary

=== Friday, June 14 ===
(artists listed from earliest to latest set times)

- What Stage:
  - Trombone Shorty & Orleans Avenue
  - Local Natives
  - Passion Pit
  - Wilco
  - Paul McCartney
- Which Stage:
  - Trixie Whitley
  - Jason Isbell and the 400 Unit
  - Of Monsters and Men
  - Grizzly Bear
  - Wu-Tang Clan
  - The xx
  - Pretty Lights
- This Tent:
  - Sea Wolf
  - Calexico
  - Glen Hansard
  - Foals
  - Jim James
  - ZZ Top
  - Animal Collective
- That Tent:
  - Bernhoft
  - Bombino
  - Fatoumata Diawara
  - Amadou & Mariam
  - John McLaughlin & The 4th Dimension
  - Superjam with RZA, DJ Jazzy Jeff, Schoolboy Q, Solange, Chad Hugo, featuring Lettuce plus Special Guests
- The Other Tent:
  - Reptar
  - Charli XCX
  - DIIV (played in place of Earl Sweatshirt)
  - Big K.R.I.T.
  - Conspirator
  - Wolfgang Gartner
  - Porter Robinson
- Bonnaroo Comedy Theatre hosted by IFC:
  - Chris Gethard, Eric Andre, Nikki Glaser & Cristela Alonzo
  - Mike Birbiglia featuring Michael Che
  - Daniel Tosh featuring Jerrod Carmichael (2 sets)
- New Music On Tap Lounge brewed by Miller Lite:
  - Alanna Royale
  - He's My Brother, She's My Sister
  - Rayland Baxter
  - Ryan Montbleau Band
  - NOCONA
  - Cloney
  - Ex-Cops
  - Casey Crescenzo
  - Matrimony
  - Luxury Liners
- Cafe Where?:
  - Naia Kete
  - Jillette Johnson
  - Von Grey
  - ON an ON
- Silent Disco:
  - Passion Pit (DJ Set)
  - Vacationer (DJ Set)
  - Atta Unsar
  - Y Luv (DJ Set)
  - DJ Logic
  - Jared Dietch
- Sonic Stage:
  - The Stepkids
  - Jonny Fritz
  - ALO
- Trombone Shorty & Orleans Avenue
  - Sea Wolf
  - Milo Greene
  - Nicki Bluhm & the Gramblers
  - Bombino
  - Calexico
- Solar Stage:
  - Appalachian Flow Arts
  - Johnnyswim
  - Wake Owl (Performance & Interview)
  - Allen Stone
  - He's My Brother She's My Sister
  - John Oates (Performance & Interview)
  - The Battleholex and Friends Hip Hop Variety Show Breakdancing
  - TBD
  - The Flavor Savers Beard & Mustache Contest
- Cinema Tent:
  - My Breakfast with Blassie – 30th Anniversary of infamous Andy Kaufman and Fred Blassie rendezvous at Denny's
  - Good Ol’ Freda – Documentary about longtime Beatles secretary and fan club president Freda Kelly
  - Sleepwalk with Me - Q&A with Mike Birbiglia
  - SYNCHRONIZE LIVE: The Road Warrior – Re-scored by DJ Thomas Golubić
  - “How to Make a Fun Music Video” – Q&A, Videos, and Live Commentary with Matt & Kim
  - An Evening with Pootie Tang – Introduction by Lance Crouther in character as “Pootie Tang”
  - [adult swim] presents: Eric Andre – Q&A and selections from “The Eric Andre Show”
  - Green Screens Presented by Rock The Earth: Musicwood: The Documentary – Q&A with filmmakers Maxine Trump and Josh Granger
  - IFC Original Programming
  - Hell Baby – Q&A with writer/director/actors Thomas Lennon and Robert Ben Garant
  - Footloose Dance-Along Party – Hosted by Henri Mazza
  - The Beastmaster
  - The Goonies

=== Saturday, June 15 ===
(artists listed from earliest to latest set times)

- What Stage:
  - Gov't Mule
  - Nas
  - Björk
  - Jack Johnson
- Which Stage:
  - Cults
  - Solange
  - Portugal. the Man
  - Cat Power
  - The Lumineers
  - R. Kelly

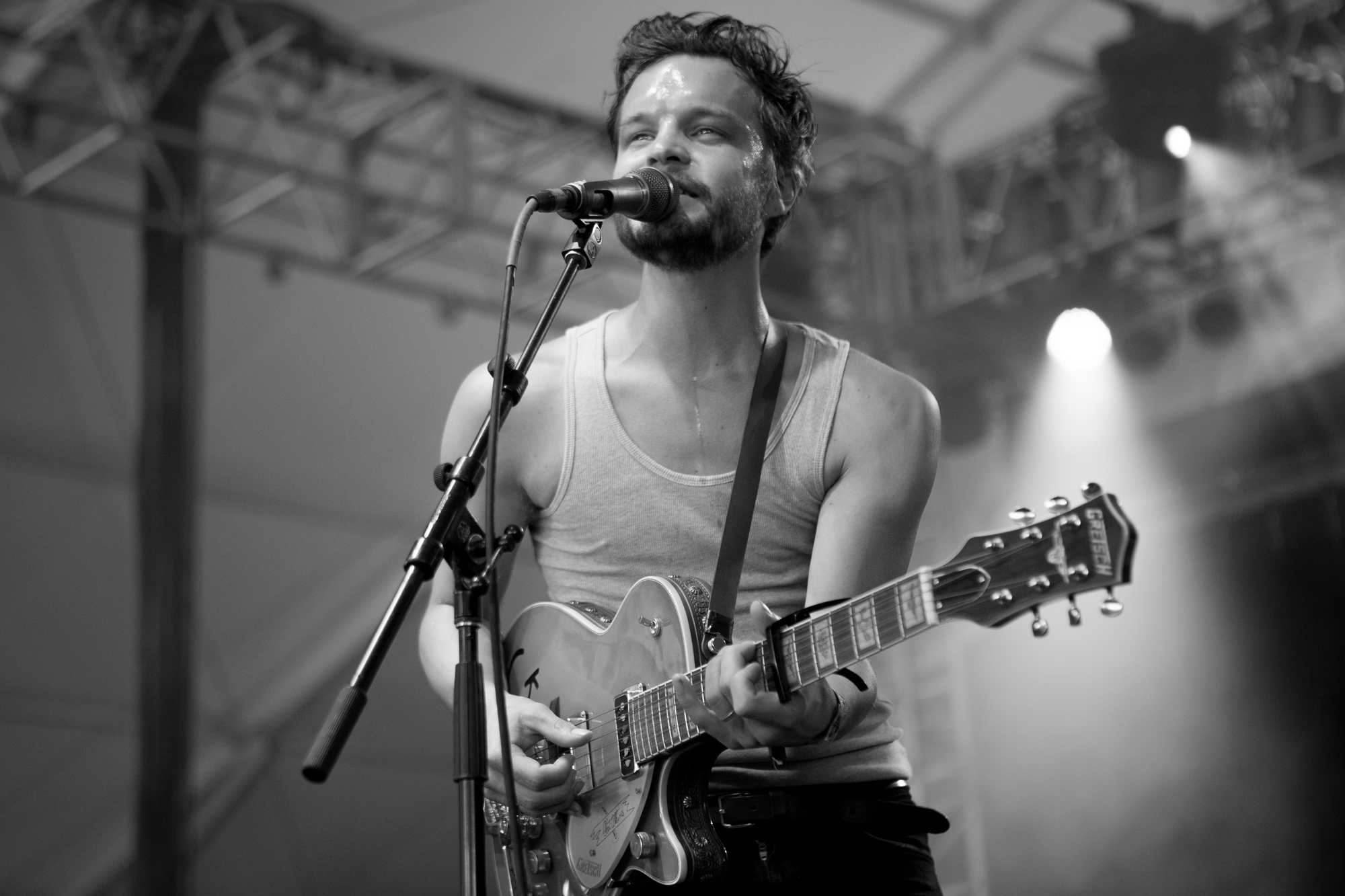
The Tallest Man on Earth performed in This Tent on the festival's third day.

- This Tent:
  - Patrick Watson
  - Lord Huron
  - Tallest Man on Earth
  - Dirty Projectors
  - Beach House
  - Preservation Hall Jazz Band
  - Rock n' Soul Dance Party Superjam featuring Jim James with John Oates, Zigaboo Modeliste, Preservation Hall Jazz Band
  - Bustle in Your Hedgerow

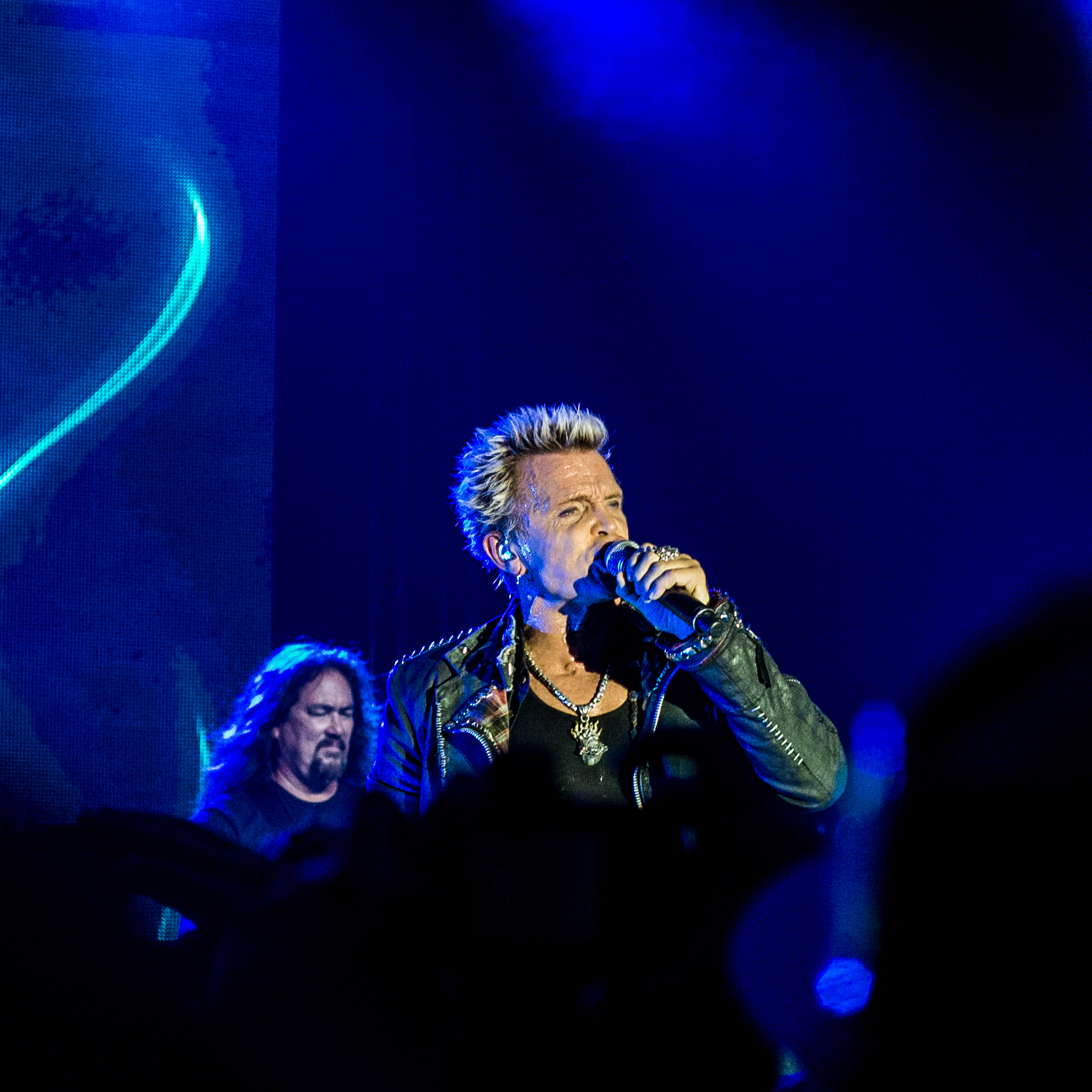
Billy Idol performed in That Tent

- That Tent:
  - Matthew E. White (cancelled due to illness)
  - Two Gallants
  - Frank Turner and the Sleeping Souls
  - Drew Holcomb and the Neighbors
  - Dwight Yoakam
  - Billy Idol
  - Empire of the Sun
- The Other Tent:
  - Clockwork
  - Death Grips
  - Four Tet
  - Matt & Kim
  - A-Trak
  - "Weird Al" Yankovic
  - Boys Noize
- Bonnaroo Comedy Theatre hosted by IFC:
  - Michael Che, Nikki Glaser, Jared Logan, James Adomian
  - Ed Helms’ Whisky Sour Radio Hour
  - David Cross featuring James Adomian
  - Comedy Bang! Bang! with Scott Aukerman and Reggie Watts
- New Music On Tap Lounge brewed by Miller Lite:
  - Ranch Ghost
  - James McCartney
  - Chris Stapleton
  - Daniel Romano & The Trilliums
  - Lucius
  - Stop Light Observations
  - SIMO
  - Bean
  - William Tyler
  - Mac DeMarco
- Cafe Where?:
  - Peanut Butter Lovesicle
  - Tiny Victories
  - Kyng
  - The Revivalists
- Silent Disco:
  - DJ Keebz
  - Sam Spiegel
  - Jared Dietch
  - MSSL CMMND
- Sonic Stage:
  - Johnnyswim
  - Futurebirds
  - Rayland Baxter
  - JEFF the Brotherhood
  - Kalidescope Space Tribe
  - Ryan Montbleau Band
  - Patrick Watson
  - Lord Huron
  - Matrimony
- Solar Stage:
  - Ryan Montbleau Band
  - Naia Kete
  - The Mowgli's
  - Preservation Hall Jazz Band
  - Very Special Guest (Performance & Interview)
  - Mawre African Drum & Dance
  - The Flavor Savers Beard & Mustache Contest
  - Carnivalesque Entertainment: Bellydance & Vaudeville
- Cinema Tent:
  - David Lynch’s Meditation, Creativity, Peace – Group meditation and Q&A with The David Lynch Foundation’s executive director Bob Roth plus Complimentary David Lynch Signature Coffee and Donuts
  - Chris Gethard Presents: Reasons I’m Both Proud and Ashamed to Be On Public Access
  - SNEAK PEEK: AMC’s “Low Winter Sun” – Q&A with actors Mark Strong and Lennie James
  - An Afternoon with animator Don Hertzfeldt – It's Such A Beautiful Day and strange surprises
  - Crystal Fairy
  - Green Screens Presented by Rock The Earth: GMO OMG – Q&A with director Jeremy Seifert
  - LIVE PERFORMANCE: An Evening with Michael Winslow – Man of 10,000 Sound Effects
  - [adult swim] presents things you've never seen
  - Evil Dead
  - Totally ‘80s Sing-Along – Hosted by Henri Mazza
  - Repo Man
  - Sixteen Candles

=== Sunday, June 16 ===
(artists listed from earliest to latest set times)

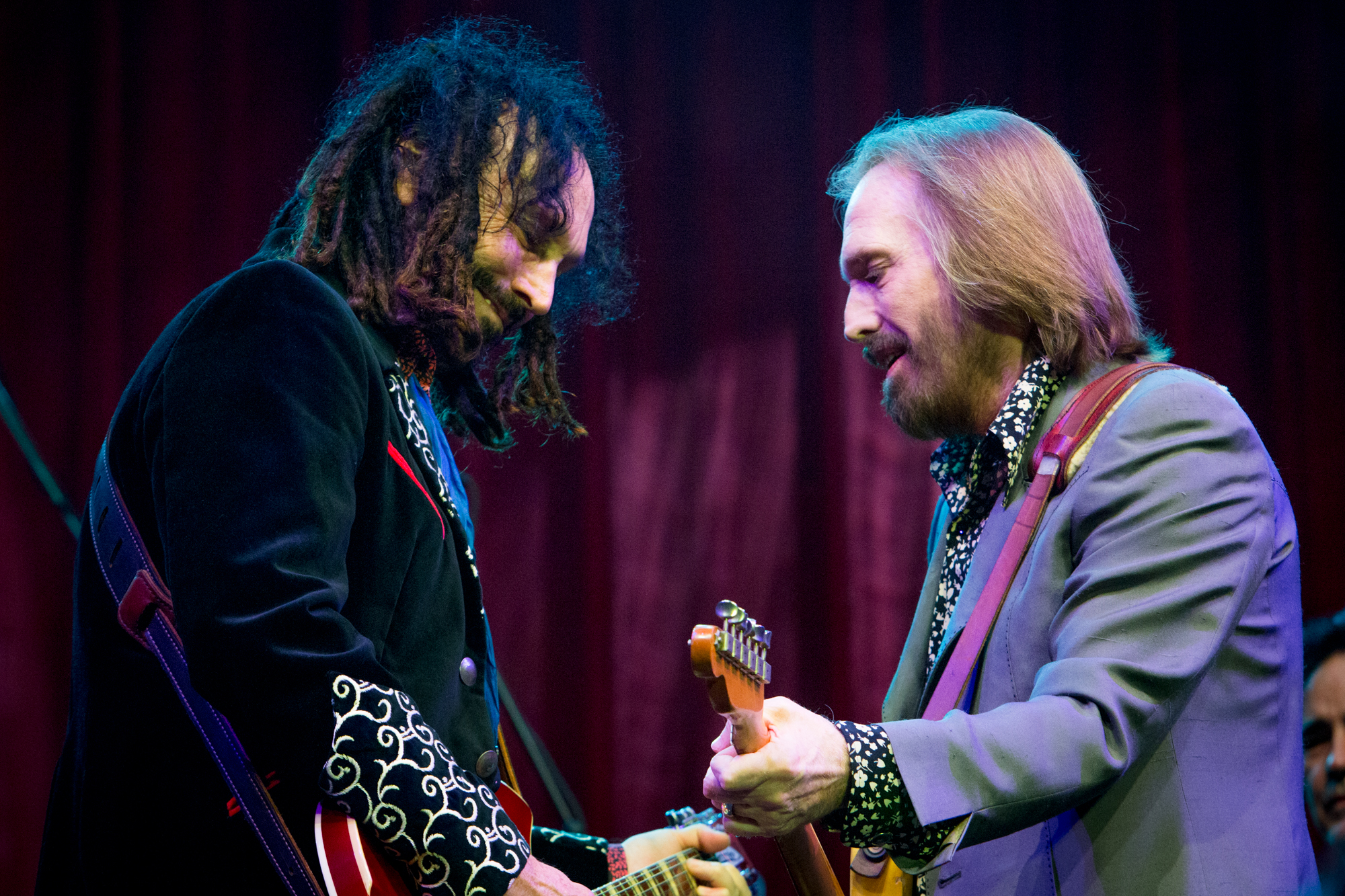
Tom Petty (right) performed as the closing act of the 2013 festival on Sunday night.

- What Stage:
  - Lee Fields & The Expressions
  - Macklemore & Ryan Lewis
  - Kendrick Lamar
  - The National
  - Tom Petty and the Heartbreakers

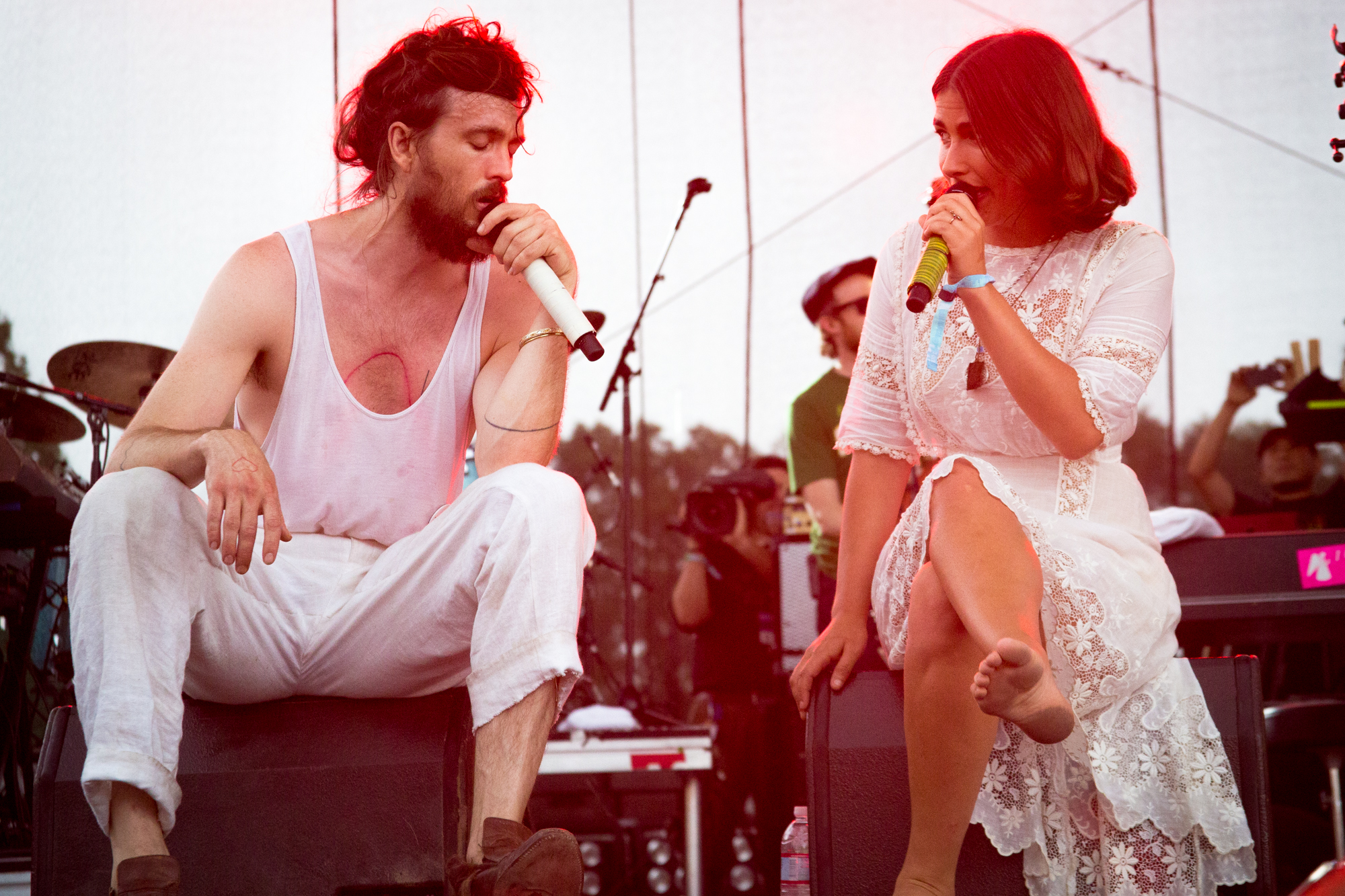
Alex Ebert and Jade Castrinos of Edward Sharpe and the Magnetic Zeros performing on Which Stage

- Which Stage:
  - Kacey Musgraves
  - Delta Rae
  - The Sheepdogs
  - Edward Sharpe and the Magnetic Zeros
  - David Byrne & St. Vincent
- This Tent:
  - The Rubens
  - JEFF the Brotherhood
  - Baroness
  - Swans
  - Divine Fits
- That Tent:
  - Aoife O'Donovan
  - John Fullbright
  - Black Prairie
  - Noam Pikelny & Friends
  - Sam Bush & Del McCoury
  - Ed Helms' Bluegrass Situation Superjam with Special Guests
- The Other Tent:
  - Action Bronson
  - Wild Nothing
  - Holy Ghost!
  - Tame Impala
  - A$AP Rocky
- Bonnaroo Comedy Theatre hosted by IFC:
  - David Cross featuring James Adomian
  - Bob Saget featuring Jared Logan & Improved Shakespeare Company (2 sets)
- New Music On Tap Lounge brewed by Miller Lite:
  - Staying for the Weekend
  - LiL iFFy
  - Cat Martino
  - Alice & The Glass Lake
  - The Mowgli's
  - Milow
  - Royal Thunder
- Cafe Where?:
  - Bri Heart featuring Jervy Hou
  - Little Red Lung
  - White Lung
- Silent Disco:
  - DJ Keebz
- Sonic Stage:
  - ItsTheReal
  - John Oates
  - Lucius
  - Mac Demarco
  - Aoife O'Donovan
  - The Revivalists
  - Delta Rae
  - The Sheepdogs
  - Surprise Set
- Solar Stage:
  - The Revivalists (Performance & Interview)
  - Very Special Guest (Interview)
  - Beans on Toast (Performance & Interview)
  - John Fullbright
  - Black Prairie (Performance & Interview)
  - The Battleholex and Friends Hip Hop Variety Show Breakdancing
- Cinema Tent:
  - Celebrate Father’s Day with Selleck, Guttenberg and Danson: Three Men and a Baby
  - Muscle Shoals
  - Mistaken For Strangers (The National documentary) – Introduction by Matt Berninger from The National
  - Green Screens Presented by Rock The Earth: Bidder 70 – Introduction by Alex Ebert of Edward Sharpe and the Magnetic Zeros and Q&A with film editor Ryan Suffern
  - The Way, Way Back – Q&A with writer/directors Jim Rash and Nat Faxon
  - [adult swim] presents things you've never seen
  - NBA Finals Game 5
