= Genauer =

Genauer is a surname. Notable people with the surname include:

- Emily Genauer (1911–2002), American art critic
- Reid Genauer (born 1972), American singer, songwriter, and musician
