= Nateva Music & Camping Festival =

Music festival

- Genre: jam band, indie, reggae, electronic, bluegrass, folk, funk, rock
- Dates: July 1–4, 2010
- Locations: Oxford, Maine, US
- Coordinates: 44°11′33″N 70°31′56″W
- Years active: 2010
- Founders: Nateva Festivals, LLC.
- Website: www.natevafestival.com

Nateva Music & Camping Festival was a four-day, multi stage, limited capacity outdoor camping festival held July 1–4, 2010 at the 100+ acre Oxford Fairgrounds in Oxford, Maine. The festival featured headliners moe., The Flaming Lips, and Furthur. Lotus headlined "early bird" activities on Thursday, July 1.

== July 1 ==
Port City Music Hall Stage:

- Lotus
- Lettuce
- Gypsy Tailwind

== July 2 ==
Main Stage 1:

- moe.
- Passion Pit
- Jakob Dylan and Three Legs
- Umphrey's McGee
- Greensky Bluegrass

Main Stage 2:

- Ghostland Observatory
- Jackie Greene
- Keller Williams
- The Felice Brothers
- Magic Magic

Port City Music Hall Stage:

- Big Gigantic (Late Night)
- The Felice Brothers (Late Night)
- The Heavy Pets
- The Problemaddicts
- Adam Ezra Group
- Bow Thayer and Perfect Trainwreck
- The Mallet Brothers

Barn Stage:

- Ryan Montbleau Band (Late Night)
- Yellow Roman Candles (acoustic intermission)

== July 3 ==
Main Stage 1:

- The Flaming Lips
- Grizzly Bear
- Drive-By Truckers
- John Brown's Body
- Rustic Overtones
- Magic Magic

Main Stage 2:

- Sound Tribe Sector 9
- She & Him
- Crash Kings
- Ryan Montbleau Band
- Brenda

Port City Music Hall Stage:

- EOTO (Late Night)
- Giant Panda Guerilla Dub Squad (Late Night)
- The Indobox
- The Brew
- The McLovins
- Roots of Creation
- Grand Hotel

Barn Stage:

- Toubab Krewe (Late Night)
- The Kind Buds (Late Night)

== July 4 ==
Main Stage 1:

- Furthur with Phil Lesh & Bob Weir
- George Clinton & P-Funk
- Max Creek
- Mark Karan's Jerimah Puddleduck

Main Stage 2:

- Derek Trucks & Susan Tedeschi Band
- Zappa Plays Zappa
- Moonalice
- You Can Be A Wesley

Port City Music Hall Stage:

- Nephrock! Allstars
- The Constellations
- Alchemystics
- Nate Wilson Group
- Billy Keane and the Misdemeanor Outlaws
- Mudseason
