= Assembly of Dust =

American rock band

- Also known as: A.O.D.
- Origin: New York
- Genres: Rock; Jam band Roots rock
- Years active: 2002 — present
- Labels: Hybrid Recordings; Lionheart
- Website: aodust.com

Assembly of Dust (also known as AOD) is an American rock band formed in 2002 by Strangefolk frontman and co-founder Reid Genauer. After the breakup of Strangefolk, Genauer decided to record a solo album, and he recruited some friends from Strangefolk's days on the road to help out. After titling the 2003 solo release “Assembly of Dust,” Genauer decided to use the name for his new group. AOD originally featured Genauer on lead vocals and guitar, Nate Wilson on the keyboard, Adam Terrell on lead guitar, John Leccese on bass, and Andy Herrick on drums. Later lineups featured Reid Genauer on lead vocals and guitar, Adam Terrell on lead guitar, John Leccese on bass, Jason Crosby on the keys and violin, and Dave Diamond on the drums.

Assembly of Dust influences include Steely Dan, The Band, J.J. Cale and Little Feat. In 2004 they recorded The Honest Hour, a live set. Five live albums were spun off their December 2005 tour. In 2007 they released their first studio album Recollection.

Assembly of Dust has performed at festivals such as Bonnaroo, Langerado, 10KLF, Wakarusa, All Good Music Festival, Gathering of the Vibes, Newport Folk Festival, and Wakarusa Music and Camping Festival.

The band's single "Vaulted Sky" from their 2013 album Sun Shot received moderate airplay from Adult Alternative-formatted stations.

In 2016, Assembly of Dust played Portland and Vermont with Nate Wilson filling in for Jason Crosby on keyboards at both shows.

In 2017, Assembly of Dust opened for Anders Osborn, being joined by guitarist Jackie Greene for a cover of “Love The One You’re With” and “Harrower.”

== Discography ==
- 2003 The Assembly of Dust — Relix Records
- 2004 The Honest Hour (live) — Hybrid Recordings (Sony)
- 2007 Recollection - Hybrid Recordings (Sony)
- 2009 Some Assembly Required - Missing Piece/Rock Ridge Music
- 2011 Found Sound (live - recorded in 2007)
- 2013 Sun Shot
- 2016 Tales From The Oregon Trail
- 2024 The Promised Hour
- 2024 Angels and Alibis (Reid Genauer solo)
