= Rhythm Devils =

American percussion-based band

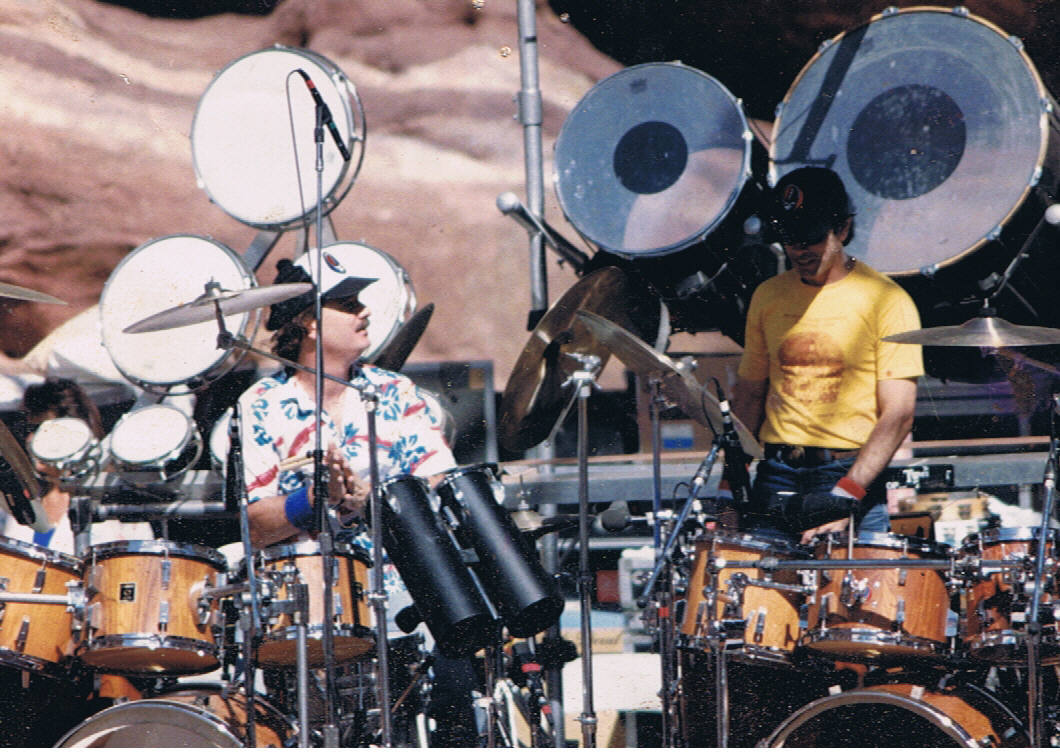
- Bill Kreutzmann and Mickey Hart

Background information
- Genres: Rock, world music
- Years active: 1979–1981, 2006, 2010–2011
- Past members: Bill Kreutzmann; Mickey Hart; Steve Kimock; Keller Williams; Reed Mathis; Sikiru Adepoju; Mike Gordon; Jen Durkin; Andy Hess; Davy Knowles; Tim Bluhm
- Website: rhythmdevils.net

The Rhythm Devils is a percussion-based rock band led by former Grateful Dead drummers Bill Kreutzmann and Mickey Hart.

== Grateful Dead ==
The Rhythm Devils had their origins as an informal but frequent fixture in the Grateful Dead concert repertoire starting in the mid-to-late 1970s, and continuing until the Grateful Dead's last concert in 1995. Most Grateful Dead concerts featured an extended segment during the 2nd set of improvisational drumming and percussion by Hart and Kreutzmann who took over the stage as a duo (with occasional guests). This segment was variously known to fans as "Rhythm Devils", "Drums", or conversationally as "the drums", and was usually followed in post-1979 concerts by another extended improvisation by the rest of the band, usually without the drummers, which was known as "Space". The "Rhythm Devils" segment of a Grateful Dead concert almost always segued out of a full-band song, and the "Space" segment almost invariably would segue into the beginnings of another full-band song as the drummers resumed their seats with the rest of the band. The Grateful Dead album Dead Set has a characteristic example of a 1980 "Rhythm Devils" segment which is titled as such, and which is followed by a "Space" segment.

== 1979-1981: Apocalypse Now sessions and early live performances ==
The Rhythm Devils duo were formally recruited by director Francis Ford Coppola to record the soundtrack to the film Apocalypse Now. During 1979 and 1980, Hart and Kreutzmann, along with other musicians (mostly percussionists), Airto Moreira, Mike Hinton, Jim Loveless, Greg Errico, Jordan Amarantha, Phil Lesh and Flora Purim, recorded sessions at the Grateful Dead's Marin County studios and "The Barn", Hart's studio in Novato. The process included improvising jungle sounds as they watched the film. The sounds were later edited into the movie. An LP record titled The Apocalypse Now Sessions: The Rhythm Devils Play River Music was issued from those sessions, (Passport Records PB 9844). In October 1990, Rykodisc re-released the original 1980 LP.

In addition to the Apocalypse Now sessions, Kreutzmann and Hart performed two live concerts as the Rhythm Devils on February 13 and 14, 1981. The live band consisted mostly of the same musicians that contributed to the sessions including: Mike Hinton (marimbas, percussion), Airto Moreira (percussion), Flora Purim (vocals, percussion), Phil Lesh (electric bass, fretless bass, percussion) and other various guests.

== 2006 Tour ==
The 2006 lineup of the Rhythm Devils featured drummers Kreutzmann, Hart, Phish bassist Mike Gordon, and guitarist Steve Kimock, with percussionist Sikiru Adepoju and vocalist Jen Durkin (formerly of Deep Banana Blackout). The band formed in the summer of 2006 and toured throughout the US shortly thereafter. Former Dead lyricist Robert Hunter provides lyrics for a number of original songs.

== 2010 - present ==
It was announced on the Gathering of the Vibes website that the Rhythm Devils would perform there in 2010 with a lineup of Bill Kreutzmann, Mickey Hart, Sikiru Adepoju, guitarists Keller Williams and Davy Knowles (Back Door Slam) and bassist Andy Hess (The Black Crowes; Gov't Mule). This was followed by the announcement of several more dates a month later. They toured into early 2011 with Tim Bluhm (The Mother Hips) replacing Keller for all dates after July 2010. A new lineup was announced for 2011 featuring Kreutzmann, Hart, Keller Williams, Steve Kimock and Reed Mathis. This combo has played one show - July 24, 2011 at the Gathering Of The Vibes Festival in Bridgeport CT. While the Rhythm Devils have not performed as a band since 2011, Mickey Hart acknowledged the possibility of more Rhythm Devils dates. Bill Kreutzmann and Mickey Hart have performed together since 2011 with the Disco Biscuits, 7 Walkers, Billy & the Kids, Dead & Company and at Fare Thee Well: Celebrating 50 Years of the Grateful Dead.

== Discography ==
- The Apocalypse Now Sessions: The Rhythm Devils Play River Music (1980)
- The Rhythm Devils Concert Experience (DVD – 2008)

== Lineups ==
Years	Members
1979-1981	Bill Kreutzmann – drums, percussion; Mickey Hart – drums, percussion; Mike Hinton - marimbas, percussion; Airto Moreira - percussion; Flora Purim - vocals, percussion; Phil Lesh – electric bass, fretless bass, percussion
1981-2006	Band split, Kreutzmann and Hart continued to perform together with the Grateful Dead (with the duo being referred to as the Rhythm Devils) until 1995 and sporadically thereafter
2006	Bill Kreutzmann – drums; Mickey Hart – drums, percussion; Jen Durkin – vocals; Steve Kimock – guitar; Mike Gordon – bass, vocals; Sikiru Adepoju – percussion
2010	Bill Kreutzmann – drums; Mickey Hart – drums, percussion; Keller Williams – guitar, vocals; Davy Knowles – guitar, vocals; Andy Hess – bass; Sikiru Adepoju – percussion
2010–2011	Bill Kreutzmann – drums; Mickey Hart – drums, percussion; Tim Bluhm – guitar, vocals; Davy Knowles – guitar, vocals; Andy Hess – bass; Sikiru Adepoju – percussion
2011	Bill Kreutzmann – drums; Mickey Hart – drums, percussion; Keller Williams – guitar, vocals; Steve Kimock – guitar; Reed Mathis – bass
