= The Apocalypse Now Sessions =

Studio album by Rhythm Devils
- Released: May 25, 1980
- Genre: World music
- Label: Passport
- Producer: Mickey Hart

Mickey Hart chronology
Diga (1976)	The Apocalypse Now Sessions (1980)	Däfos (1983)

Bill Kreutzmann chronology
The Apocalypse Now Sessions (1980)	Backbone (1999)

The Apocalypse Now Sessions is an album by the Rhythm Devils. Subtitled The Rhythm Devils Play River Music, and sometimes referred to by that name, it contains music that was recorded for the soundtrack of the film Apocalypse Now. It was released by Passport Records as a vinyl LP in 1980. It was remastered and released on CD in somewhat expanded form by Rykodisc in 1990.

The Rhythm Devils is a percussion based music ensemble led by Grateful Dead drummers Mickey Hart and Bill Kreutzmann. At the time of the recording of The Apocalypse Now Sessions, the band also included Grateful Dead bassist Phil Lesh, along with percussionists Airto Moreira, Greg Errico, Jim Loveless, and Jordan Amarantha, guitarist Mike Hinton, and vocalist Flora Purim.

== Recording ==
After attending a Grateful Dead concert, director Francis Ford Coppola asked Mickey Hart and Bill Kreutzmann to record drum music for his film Apocalypse Now, much of which takes place along a river in the jungle during the Vietnam War. Hart and Kreutzmann, along with seven other musicians, assembled many different drums and other percussion instruments at the Club Front recording studio in San Rafael, California. While a rough cut of the movie was screened, they improvised the music, some of which ended up being used on the final soundtrack. The recording sessions took place over a period of ten days. Selections from the sessions were remixed and assembled into the final album.

In addition to using a large collection of percussion instruments from around the world, provided by the various musicians, the Rhythm Devils constructed some new instruments. One of these was The Beast, an array of bass drums with different tones suspended from a large metal rack. After the recording of The Apocalypse Now Sessions, The Beast was incorporated into the "Drums" section of Grateful Dead concerts, an extended percussion duet performed by Hart and Kreutzmann in the middle of the second set of songs.

Another unusual percussion instrument built for the sessions, variants of which have been built and later used in Grateful Dead concerts and Mickey Hart's solo touring bands, was The Beam. This is a large aluminum I-beam (actually a C-shaped beam facing down with the strings across the flat outside-top surface) strung with 13 bass piano strings all tuned to the note of D (a Pythagorean mono-chord at various octaves). The Beam has a heavy-duty bridge and string anchor at one end and a nut with tuning hardware at the other end. It has a movable magnetic pickup block to facilitate capture and transmission of various tonal qualities. The pickup block feeds a volume pedal and various audio effects units, which route the signals through an amplifier or sound system. The Beam generates a large variety of low-frequency primary tones and harmonic overtones, and is played by hitting the strings with a percussion mallet, plucking the strings by hand or with a plectrum, scraping them with various implements (fingernails, plectrums, metal bars), or by pounding on the beam frame itself to induce a bell-like resonance of all the strings simultaneously.

== Critical reception ==
Professional ratings
Review scores
Source	Rating
Allmusic	4.5/5 stars

Allmusic said, "Three members of The Grateful Dead (Mickey Hart, Bill Kreutzmann, and Phil Lesh) improvise on percussion instruments with several other musicians to provide incidental music for the movie Apocalypse Now. This is primarily a percussion album... an intense album that artfully conveys the beauty and terror of the jungle in which the movie is set."

Smithsonian Folkways, writing about the CD, said, "Director Francis Ford Coppola asked Mickey Hart to provide a percussive underscore for his 1979 film Apocalypse Now. Combining the quiet sounds of tablas with harsher sounds of drum sets and demonstrating Hart's propensity for unusual time signatures, the album echoes the tones of war and death, and features extended tracks as well as tracks not included on the original LP release...."

== Track listing ==
All music written by the Rhythm Devils.

=== LP ===
Side 1:

1. "Compound"
2. "Trenches"
3. "Street Gang"
4. "The Beast"

Side 2:

1. "Steps"
2. "Tar"
3. "Lance"
4. "Cave"
5. "Napalm for Breakfast"
6. "Hell's Bells"

=== CD ===
1. "Compound" – 3:17
2. "Trenches" – 3:52
3. "Street Gang" – 2:14
4. "The Beast" – 4:12
5. "Steps" – 2:26
6. "Tar" – 1:38
7. "Lance" – 2:50
8. "Cave" – 5:55
9. "Hell's Bells" – 3:29
10. "Kurtz" – 4:49
11. "Napalm for Breakfast" – 3:25

== Personnel ==
=== The Rhythm Devils ===
- Mickey Hart
- Bill Kreutzmann
- Airto Moreira
- Michael J. Hinton
- Jim Loveless
- Greg Errico
- Jordan Amarantha
- Flora Purim
- Phil Lesh

=== Production ===
- Producer: Mickey Hart
- Associate producer: Gian-Carlo Coppola
- Production assistant: Creek Hart
- Engineers: Brett Cohen, Betty Cantor-Jackson, Dan Healy
- Assistant engineers: John Cutler, Bob Mathews
- CD mastering: Joe Gastwirt
- Cover art: Stanley Mouse
- Photography: John Werner, Steve Schneider, Snooky Flowers
- Package design: Steven Jurgensmeyer
