= Schleigho =

- Origin: New York City, New York, U.S.
- Genres: Acid jazz; funk
- Members: Jesse Gibbon; Suke Cerulo; Erik Egol; Drew McCabe
- Past members: Matt Rubano; Paco Mahone

Schleigho is a four-piece band centered on New York City, consisting of Jesse Gibbon (keyboards), Suke Cerulo (guitar, flute, and saxophone), Erik Egol (drums) and Drew McCabe (bass). Their music could be described as a fusion of acid jazz and funk, and is mostly instrumental and improvisational.

== Bassists ==
While keyboards, guitar, and drums have remained consistent, Schleigho has featured several bassists over the years. Earlier albums including Farewell to the Sun and In the Interest of Time featured original member Drew McCabe on bass. Taking Back Sunday bassist Matt Rubano replaced McCabe in 2000 and played with Schleigho for about a year. During that time he appeared on studio album Continent. Paco Mahone also played with Schleigho for several years after Rubano left, appearing on live album Live at Ho-Down 2000 as well as an unreleased album that was made available on their webpage.

== Ho-Down ==
After the unofficial first Ho-Down in the backyard of Eric Krasno (of Soulive) in 1996, Schleigho began a festival that would run for three years in Wendell, MA in the middle of the forest. These groundbreaking line-ups included Lettuce, Boud Deun, The Slip (band), Soulive, Derek Trucks Band, Lake Trout (band), Jazz Mandolin Project, yeP!, Actual Proof, The Hosemobile, Moon Boot Lover, Bob Moses, Yolk, Birth and many others. The festivals focused on the community of highly acclaimed bands in the genres of jazz, funk and improvisational exploration. Schleigho's 2001 album, 'Live at Ho-Down 2000' features live performances from the 2000 Ho-Down with special guests on several tracks including Derek Trucks, Kofi Burbridge and Joshua Smith.

== Current status ==
Most members are currently playing in other projects. Jesse plays Latin Jazz in the NYC area and was in the touring band for Teddy Geiger, along with playing gigs with Jen Durkin and Bombsquad. Suke plays with Lynch and has several other projects along with his teaching job at NYC guitar school. Erik teaches near Half Moon Bay, CA. Drew teaches music in the Catskills and is married with three kids.

Since 2004, Schleigho has only played sporadically, with shows featured a rotating cast of the above bassists. A pair of shows in late 2007 featured Matt Rubano back on bass for the first time since May 2000. They played in Syracuse and Buffalo on November 30 and December 1, respectively. Most recently they played in Albany on November 14, 2009, at The Harvest Jam in Warsaw, NY in September 2010 and Night Lights Music Festival in Sherman, NY in 2011 and 2012. In 2021, they played Flyday Music Festival on October 1 and club shows in Albany, NY on November 12 and Rochester, NY on November 13.

== Discography ==
With Drew McCabe on Bass:

- Schleigho (1995)
- Farewell to the Sun
- In the Interest of Time (1998)

With Matt Rubano on Bass:

- Continent (2000), Flying Frog Records

With Paco Mahone on Bass:

- Live at Ho-down 2000 (2001), Flying Frog Records
- Unreleased Album (2002)
