= McLovins =

US musical group

- Origin: Hartford
- Genre: Rock
- Years active: 2009–2019
- Label: Independent
- Members: Justin Berger; Jake Huffman; Atticus Kelly; Jason Ott
- Past members: Jeff Howard
- Website: mclovins.band

McLovins were an American rock band formed in 2009. The band's lineup consisted of lyricist and drummer Jake Huffman, bass guitarist Jason Ott, guitarist Justin Berger and keyboardist Atticus Kelly. Inspired by an eclectic mix of influences like The Meters, The Band and The Flaming Lips, McLovins combined their songwriting skills with extended improvisations and instrumental ingenuity. Taking a page from their jam band forefathers, McLovins always tried to keep their audiences guessing at what's to come. Their eclectic setlists and individual musical personas defined the band's live shows. Hailing from Hartford, Connecticut, McLovins appeared at Gathering of The Vibes, Mountain Jam, The Peach Festival and the legendary Nateva Music Festival, as well as many acclaimed venues across the country. They have also performed with some of the most influential artists on the scene, including Buddy Guy, George Porter Jr. and Oteil Burbridge.

== Personnel ==
- Jake Huffman - Vocals, Percussion
- Jason Ott - Bass Guitar, Vocals
- Justin Berger - Guitar, Vocals
- Atticus Kelly - Keyboards, Vocals

== History ==
The band was founded in the summer of 2008 after a series of chance meetings between the trio at local music camps. The band toured locally in Southern New England playing a mixture of covers and their own original compositions, though it was a video cover of Phish's "You Enjoy Myself" that gained them attention on YouTube. In the spring of 2009 they released their first studio album Conundrum, which featured original songs inspired by the Norton Juster novel The Phantom Tollbooth. Conundrum featured graphics by Ink Design Studios, which is also responsible for the band's psychedelic skull logo. The band was featured in Rolling Stone magazine.

In the summer of 2009 the band performed on the Green Vibes tent at the Gathering of the Vibes where they played to a crowd of over 1,000 people. McLovins commissioned a pair of posters from poster artist AJ Masthay to commemorate McLovins Phish Pre-Shows in Hartford and Satatoga Springs as part of the celebration for Phish's 2009 reunion tour. During the fall of 2009 and Winter of 2010 they continued to tour regionally throughout New England, including their first appearance at Moe.'s spring festival Snoe.down as well as playing Nectar's in Burlington, Vermont. They have managed to cultivate a loyal following due to multiple appearances at Keene State College. McLovins have done several shows at Troy, New York's Revolution Hall including a double bill with 7 Walkers on the venue's closing night. In the spring of 2010 the band released their second studio album, Good Catch, featuring original songs written by the band.

In the summer of 2010 the band scheduled numerous festival appearances including StrangeCreek, Mountain Jam, the inaugural Nateva Music Festival, Gathering of the Vibes, Bella Terra Festival and WormTown. The band continued to play locally and regionally with favorite venues including Black Eyed Sally's, The Main Pub and they have made several appearances at Brooklyn Bowl as well as Sullivan Hall in NYC. In the fall of 2010, McLovins collaborated with Phish lyricist Tom Marshall and his partner Anthony Krizan (of Spin Doctors fame) to co-write "Cohesive", which they recorded with Marshall and Krizan at Krizan's Sonic Boom studios. They debuted the song during a performance at Brooklyn Bowl where they were joined onstage by both Marshall and Krizan. The band also released a commemorative poster of this show, produced by AJ Masthay. They set an aggressive touring schedule for 2011 with return trips to Nectars, Fairfield Theatre Company, Infinity Hall and the band's first trip to The IronHorse Music Hall in Northampton, Massachusetts.

Moving into spring of 2011, the band continued to tour and scored opening slots for Buddy Guy and Bill Kreutzmann's 7 Walkers among others. They also began work on their third album utilizing Marshall and Krizan to co-produce with the band. Marshall also contributed two songs to the disc along with their previous collaboration, the single "Cohesive", with all songs recorded at Krizan's Sonic Boom studios. The summer tour included stops at Strangecreek, Camp Creek and their first ever Main Stage performance kicking off Saturday's Gathering of the Vibes festivities. In the fall, the band's academic pressures began to limit their touring schedule until just after Thanksgiving when founding guitarist Jeff Howard decided he was leaving the group. Jeff finished the year out with four shows in December, his last concert with the band was December 30, 2011 at Pearl Street in Northampton.

The debut show featuring new guitarists Justin Berger and Atticus Kelly was New Year's Eve 2011 at Arch Street Tavern in Hartford, Connecticut. McLovins also released their third studio album, Who Knows, on January 14, 2012, as a digital only download. The band was asked by ESPN2 to appear as a house band on three episodes of their afternoon variety show, SportsNation. The appearances were originally broadcast on June 27–29. The band will reprise these appearances the last week of August.

In January 2014, the band set off on their first Mid-Atlantic/Southern tour playing venues from Baltimore Maryland to Miami Florida. January 2014 also saw the release of the band's 4th full-length album Beautiful Lights, the first to feature Justin Berger and Atticus Kelly.

In summer 2015, the band recorded the eponymous "McLovins" (also known as "The Red Album") with Grammy Award-winning producer Bill Sherman at Yellow Sound Labs in New York City's East Village.

McLovins continued to tour the continental United States under the management of Michael Novick until their last live show on Wednesday, November 21, 2018. McLovins members are currently working on other projects.

Jake Huffman Solo Project: In 2019, Jake felt the urge to evolve his sound further and enlisted the help of producing wizard Andy Seltzer (Maggie Rodgers, Chelsea Cutler, many more). The result of three days in Los Angeles with Andy marked the debut release of Jake's solo project. The sound combines rock n’ roll and Jake's acumen as a songwriter with Andy's golden touch as a next-generation producer.

When 2020 hit, Jake Huffman started "Jake Huffman’s Sunday Mixdown." He felt a bit stuck in the usual routine of a professional artist and decided to create a direct line to his musical expression. Jake produces, mixes, and directs the weekly video series himself, making "JHSMD" a personal project that isn't shaped by opinions from the outside. As social distancing became more common, Jake and his partner, Coley, used the series as a way to stay connected with people.

Justin Berger: Justin was under the tutelage of Jason Brook Zimmerman at the same time as Ari Leff (Lauv) and they played in the same groups, run by the Philadelphia local music lesson service, Traveling Musician. Justin studied jazz guitar from an early age up until he went on to get a Music Production & Technology degree from the University of Hartford Hartt School of Music in 2015. Justin's current project is called Little Kingdoms.

== Discography ==
=== Conundrum ===
Released in 2009, produced by Dave Colbourne of New Vizion Studios

- Purple Trees
- Bri (In Memory Of)
- Guillotine Machine
- Killing Time
- Sea of Wisdom
- Dynne
- Rhyme & Reason
- Conundrum
- Please Refund These Sleeping Pills

=== Virtual Circle ===
An EP released by the band in 2009 produced by Dave Colbourne of New Vizion Studios

- Virtual Circle
- Hell Yeah

=== Good Catch ===
Released in 2010, produced by Dave Colbourne of New Vizion Studios

- Tokyo Tea
- Deep Monster Trance
- This Town
- Milktoast Man
- Hell Yeah
- 3:47
- Virtual Circle
- 20 in a 35
- Quiet Kings
- Beadhead Crystal Bugger
- Good Catch

=== Cohesive ===
A single released in 2010, produced by Tom Marshall & Anthony Krizan at Sonic Boom Studios

- Cohesive (Marshall, The McLovins)

=== Who Knows ===
Released in 2012, produced by Tom Marshall & Anthony Krizan at Sonic Boom Studios

- Hesitate (Marshall, The McLovins)
- Close To The Line
- Cohesive (Marshall, The McLovins)
- Mon Ami
- Tetop
- On The Way Up
- Subdivision 2 (Marshall, The McLovins)
- Love Is Purple

=== Beautiful Lights ===
Released in 2014, produced by Anthony Krizan at Sonic Boom Studios. This is the first album to feature Atticus Kelly and Justin Berger.

- Flavor of the Week
- Tracy
- Man in a Blue Coat
- 8 Dogs
- Brickbone
- Beautiful Lights
- Cold Cold Iron
- Samson
- Shivers
- Yankee Rose
- Daze
- Birthday

=== Funk No. Uno ===
Released during Summer Tour 2014. This album was entirely produced by the band themselves.

- Catch The Ball
- Funk No. Uno
- Step Sista
- Wasp

=== McLovins ===
Released Fall of 2015, Music by McLovins, Lyrics by Jake Huffman, Produced by Bill Sherman and Michael Novick, Engineered by Matthias Winter, Mixed by Douglas Derryberry, Mastered by Joe Lambert Mastering, Recorded at Yellow Sound Labs, New York, New York

- Talk About It
- H.T.L.
- Regulars
- Thick Of It
- Gold In The World
- Jane
- Hit It, Quit It
- We Go Wild
- Greenhouse
- P.T.
- Hold Up
- Make 'em Like That

=== Great Escape ===
Single released September 22, 2017, Music by McLovins, Lyrics by Jake Huffman, Produced by McLovins and Matt Baltrucki. Engineered, Mixed and Mastered by Matt Baltrucki, Recorded at University of Hartford.

- Great Escape

== Live recording ==
McLovins subscribe to a free and open taping policy. They allow taping of any show where the venue also allows live taping. Matrix recordings of shows, a mix of soundboard and audience recordings, are available for many shows and all recordings are posted at Archive.Org for free download and sharing.
