= Barefoot Truth =

American roots rock band

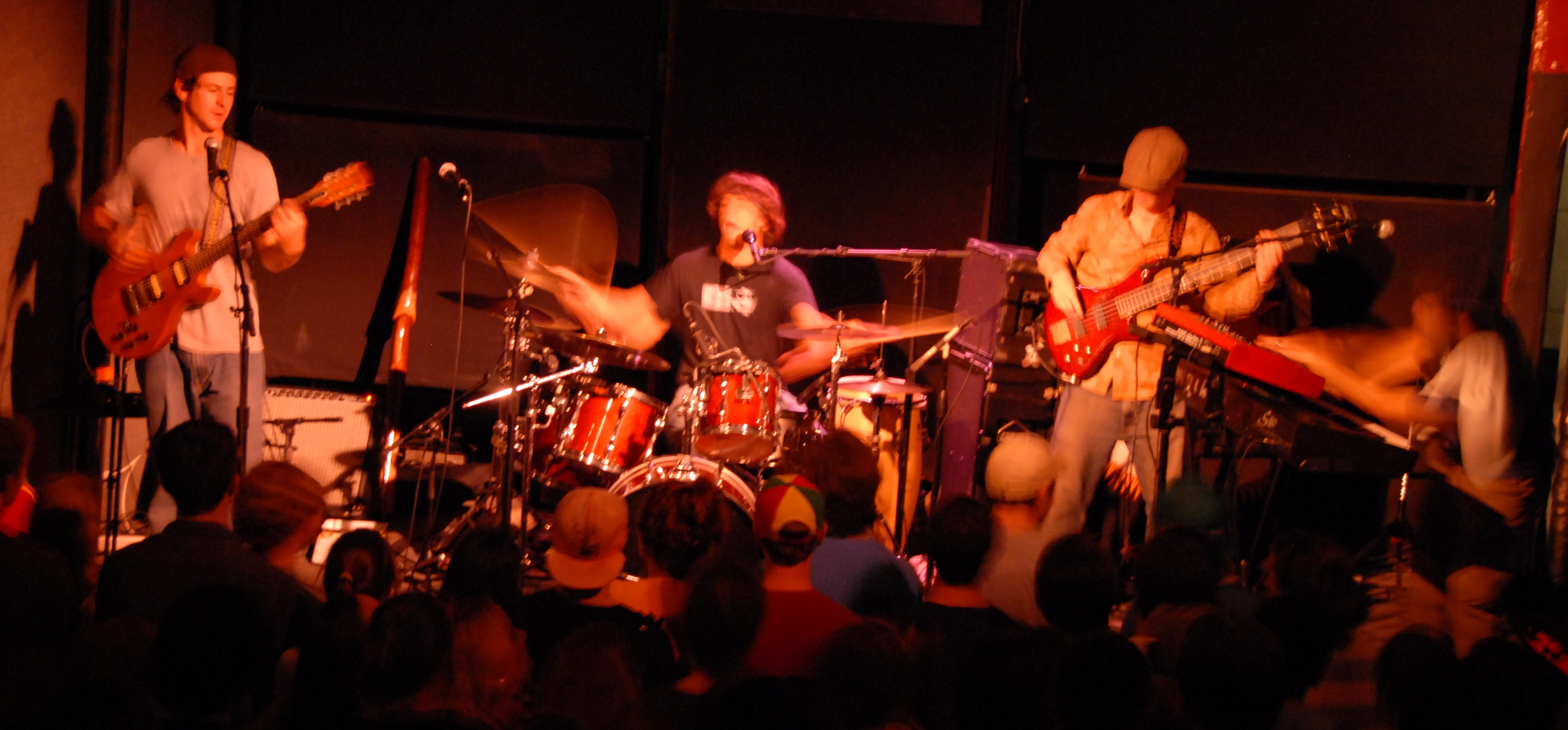
- Barefoot Truth live in 2005.

Background information
- Origin: Mystic, Connecticut, U.S.
- Genres: Rock, Folk
- Years active: 2005-2012, Occasional appearances 2015-present
- Label: Independent
- Members: William Evans; John Jay Driscoll; Garrett Duffy; John Waynelovich (Wayno); Andy Wrba
- Website: http://www.barefoottruth.com/

Barefoot Truth was an American independent roots rock band from New England. Barefoot Truth consisted of Will Evans (lead vocals, drums, acoustic guitar), Jay Driscoll (electric guitar, Weissenborn, acoustic guitar), Andy Wrba (upright bass, electric bass), Garrett Duffy (harmonica), and John "Wayno" Waynelovich (piano, organ). They performed at a pre-debate rally in New York for the Obama presidential campaign. In July 2012, the band announced on their website that they would be breaking up following a farewell tour in fall 2012. During the band's final show in Boston on November 11, 2012, this was changed to the band being on hiatus, rather than breaking up.

Over Memorial Day weekend of 2015, the band reunited to play a set as part of the Summer Sound Festival at Tanglewood in Lenox, Massachusetts. The set featured both Barefoot Truth songs and some of Will Evans' solo music. They continue to reunite every year or so for occasional studio and live work.

== Discography ==
- 2005: Changes in the Weather
- 2006: Club House Sessions
- 2007: Walk Softly
- 2009: Wake the Mountain with Pete Francis
- 2010: Life is Calling with Naia Kete
- 2010: Threads
- 2011: Live at Higher Ground
- 2011: Carry Us On
- 2014: Live From Boomtown
- 2019: Live & Acoustic at Northfire

== Band members ==
- Will Evans - lead vocals, drums, guitar
- Jay Driscoll - vocals, guitar, weissenborn, bass guitar
- Andy Wrba - double bass, bass guitar, guitar
- Garrett Duffy - harmonica, percussion
- Wayno - keyboards, vocals
