= Band Together =

Band Together was a musical concert put on for the people of Canterbury, New Zealand, as a response to the 2010 Canterbury earthquake which had occurred a month earlier. It was held on 23 October 2010 at Christchurch's Hagley Park.

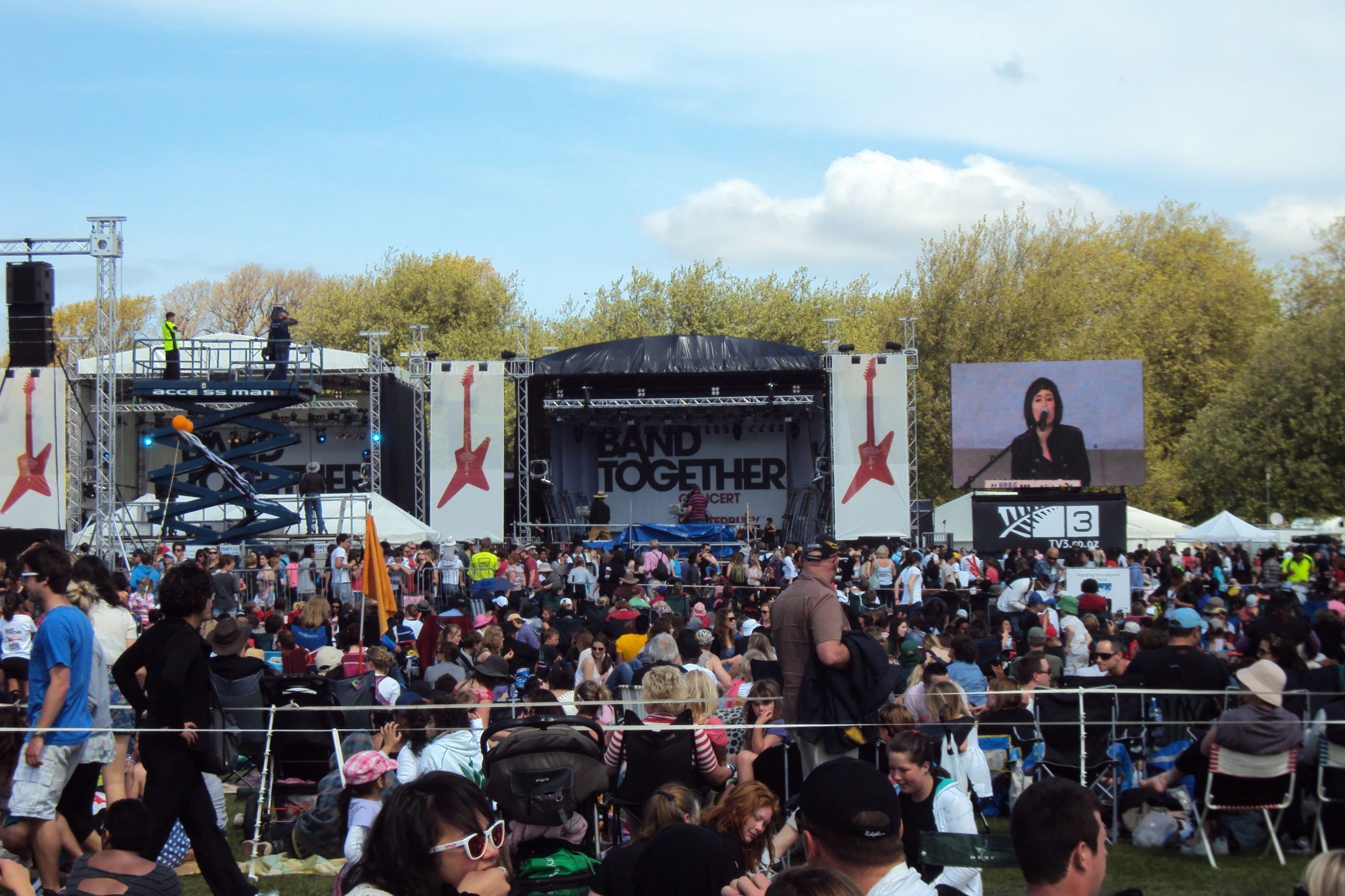
Band Together

Organised by Opshop frontman Jason Kerrison and New Zealand music personality Paul Ellis, over 31 different acts performed on two stages erected in the city's North Hagley Park, many of whom had been raised in the region and wanted to give back to their hometown.

With appearances by Christchurch mayor Bob Parker, the Prime Minister of New Zealand, John Key. and a number of media personalities including Hilary Barry, Jason Gunn, Simon Barnett, it was broadcast live across New Zealand from midday through to 8pm on TV3.

== Performers ==
Performers included (in order of performance):

- Dame Malvina Major
- Te Kotahitanga Kapa Haka
- Che Fu
- King Kapisi
- Dane Rumble
- A'ppreeshiate
- Nathan King
- Clap Clap Riot
- Ray Columbus
- Dinah Lee
- Ivy Lies
- Barry Saunders and The Eastern with Lindon Puffin
- The Dukes
- Julia Deans
- Anika Moa
- Swarm Dance Crew
- Minuit
- The Feelers
- The Bats
- Evermore
- Midnight Youth
- Bic Runga
- Opshop
- J Williams
- Dave Dobbyn
- The Exponents
