= The Machine (band) =

American Pink Floyd tribute band

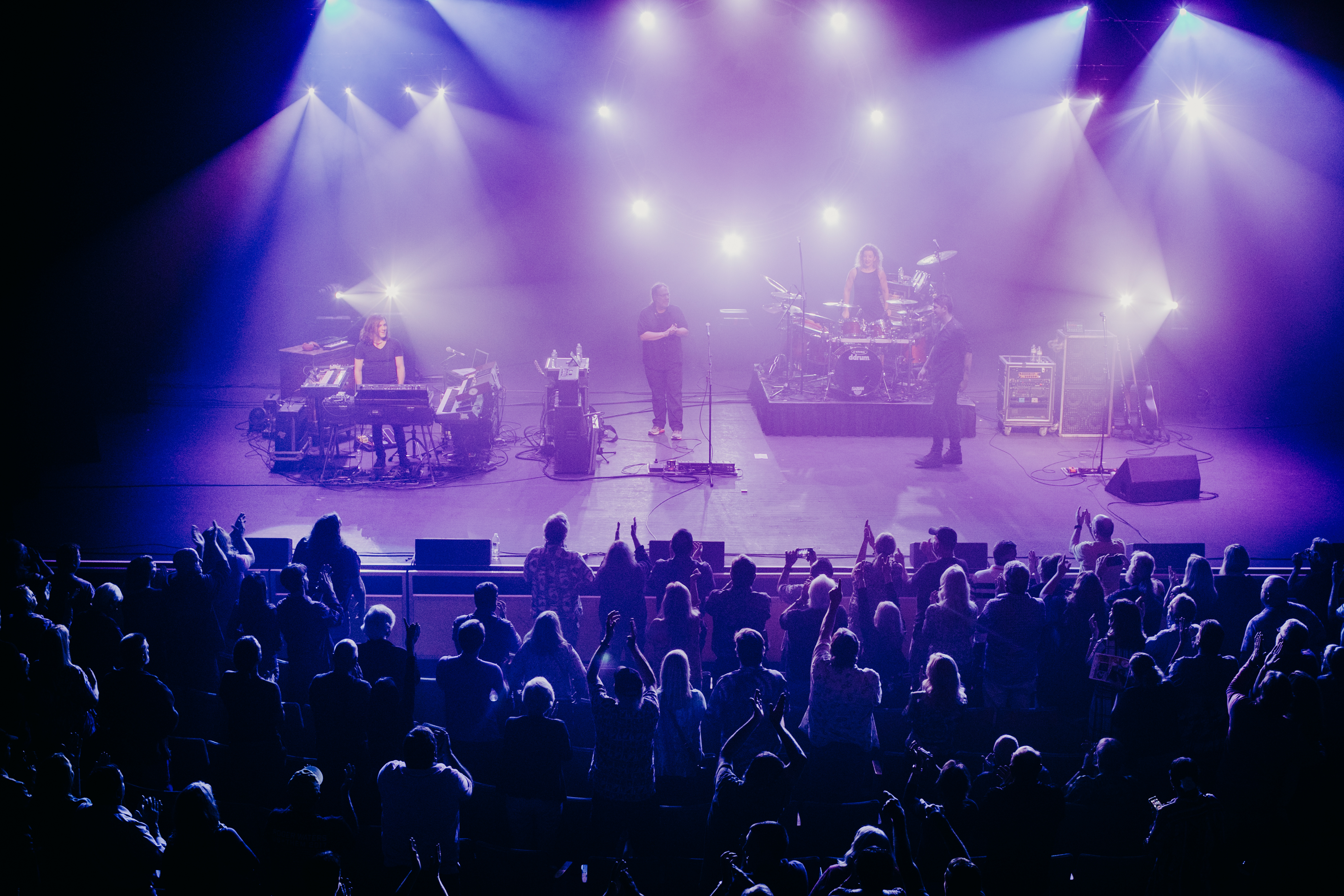
- The Machine performs Pink Floyd. Melbourne, FL. February 2020.

Background information
- Origin: New York City, New York, USA
- Genre: Progressive rock
- Years active: 1988–present
- Members: Chris DeAngelis; Tahrah Cohen; Scott Chasolen; Ryan Ball
- Website: www.themachinelive.com

The Machine is one of the oldest U.S. Pink Floyd tribute bands. Formed in 1988 by Tahrah Cohen and Joe Pascarell, the band has performed many shows around the world.

The Machine began as a cover band who played gigs local to the Rockland County, NY area and did not play Pink Floyd Music exclusively. In 1989, they were approached by a talent agent and it was suggested that they perform full-time. They seemed to garner such a delighted response from their audiences that the band's reputation continued to grow and soon they became one of the forerunners of the tribute band phenomenon.

The band has played thousands of shows worldwide and has seen several lineup changes. The most significant change came in December 2012 when Pascarell left the band for the second time (Pascarell also left the band in the year 2000 resulting in a 9-month hiatus). In January 2013, bassist Ryan Ball became the lead guitarist and Adam Minkoff joined on bass and lead vocals. During the fall of 2015 Pascarell rejoined on lead guitar and lead vocals, Ryan Ball returned to bass. In March 2018, Ryan Ball left the band and was replaced by longtime friend of the band Stephen Bard who stayed on for one year and departed in March 2019. Bard was then replaced by Dylan Kelehan, who parted ways with the group on April 3, 2021, which marked the return of Machine veteran, Ryan Ball.

On The Machine's official Facebook page on January 25, 2022, it was announced that Joe Pascarell had died. "It is with the most broken of hearts that we announce the passing of our friend, bandmate, and brother, Joe Pascarell." The Machine has continued to perform with interim members bassists/vocalists Adam Minkoff and Connor Kennedy.

On September 21, 2022, it was announced that Connecticut based bassist and teacher, Chris DeAngelis, had joined the lineup on bass and vocals.

== Members ==
Current members:

- Chris DeAngelis (bass, vocals)
- Scott Chasolen (keyboards, vocals)
- Tahrah Cohen (drums)
- Ryan Ball (lead guitar, vocals)

Past members:

- Stephen Bard
- Dylan Kelehan
- Neil 'Nail' Alexander
- Adam Price
- Marc Zimmerman
- Wes Nagy
- Sarah Gardner
- Joe Pascarell
- Adam Minkoff

== Discography ==
- (1999) Softly Spoken Magic Spells (A live concert recording from The Wetlands in New York City, including a performance of Pink Floyd's classic album The Dark Side of the Moon
- (2000) Till We Meet Again
- (2003) Two Nights at the Keswick (Live CD & DVD)
- (2006) The Machine Unplugged (Recorded Live at the BB King's Blues Club in NYC in October 2005)
- (2007) The Machine Live In Amsterdam (DVD recorded of a live performance in Amsterdam)
- (2011) The Symphonic Side of the Moon (Live performance of the Dark Side of the Moon and "Comfortably Numb" with a symphony orchestra)
