= Reid Genauer =

American musician

Reid Genauer (born May 19, 1972) is an American singer, songwriter and musician best known as the singer and guitarist of the bands Strangefolk and Assembly of Dust. More recently he has recorded and performed under the moniker Reid Genauer & Folks. He has been active as a composer, recording artist, and live performer since the early 1990s, and is known for his story-like lyrical style of folk rock.

== Musical career ==
Genauer, originally from Chappaqua, New York, started his music career in college at the University of Vermont, where he and guitarist Jon Trafton started Strangefolk as an acoustic duo originally named Strange Folk. Genauer and Trafton added bassit Erik Glockler and drummer Luke Smith to the group and changed the name to Strangefolk. The quartet found grassroots success with self produced albums Lore and Weightless in Water and consistent national touring.

After 10 years of recording and touring, Reid Genauer left Strangefolk in 2001 and formed a second group called Assembly of Dust. The group's first recording was released under Reid Genauer's name as a solo album titled Assembly of Dust in 2003. Subsequently, he assumed the album title as the band's name and found critical acclaim with live album The Honest Hour. and studio album Some Assembly Required. The latter of these featured a guest musician on each track including Richie Havens, Béla Fleck, Mike Gordon, Grace Potter, Tony Rice, David Grisman, Al Schnier, Keller Williams, Jerry Douglas and John Scofield.

In 2018 Genauer organized a cast of 24 musicians to record his latest studio album, Conspire to Smile, under the moniker Reid Genauer & Folks. The album primarily consists of cover songs whose messages point towards love, positivity and community as a source of solidarity. The songs range from Lenny Kravitz's "Let Love Rule" to Woody Guthrie's classic folk song "This Land Is Your Land".

=== Songwriting and musical style ===
Genauer began writing poems at the age of 10 after reading Shel Silverstein's Where the Sidewalk Ends. He started writing songs at 14. Since then he has gone on to write, record, and publish more than 100 songs. His songwriting has drawn comparisons to his early influences, including Jerry Garcia and Robert Hunter of the Grateful Dead. The Band, Crosby, Stills, Nash and Young, The Beatles, and Paul Simon.

== Author and entrepreneur ==
Genauer has worked at Snapple, Fox Mobile Group, and eMusic. He was recruited by Magisto in 2012.

In May 2016, Genauer was chosen as one of the "100 Most Influential North American Tech Marketers" by Hot Topics.

== Writer ==
Genauer has published articles on human interest, marketing and the tech industry. He also writes about the importance of storytelling in human culture.

Genauer was a contributor for the book "Lessons from the Road: Musicians as Business Leaders" (Oct 17, 2017, Archer Publications).

== Children's book author ==
In 2016, Reid wrote and published Jeffry's Jungle (2016, CreateSpace Independent Publishing), a 24-page children's book for ages 4–10, illustrated by Alan Close. It chronicles the mischief of a young boy and the power of his imagination. The book was inspired by Shel Silverstein's "Where the Sidewalk Ends" and is written in the spirit of Dr. Seuss's "The Cat in the Hat.”

Genauer has written more than 100 children's poems and plans to publish a series of books in the future.

== Personal life ==
Reid was married once and is the father of three boys.

== Discography ==
=== With Strangefolk ===
- Strangefolk (1994)
- Lore (1995)
- Weightless in Water (1998)
- Live (EP) (2000)
- A Great Long While (2000)
- Live at the Capitol Theatre Port Chester, NY 12/27/98 (Live) (2012)
- Live at the Palladium Worcester MA (2018)

=== Solo ===
- Assembly of Dust (2003)
- Reid Genauer & Folks, Conspire to Smile (2018)
- Reid Genauer & Folks, Extended Release (Live) (2020)

=== With Assembly of Dust ===
- The Honest Hour (2004)
- Recollection (2007)
- Some Assembly Required (2009)
- Found Sound - Live (2011)
- Sun Shot (2013)
- Live from The Oregon Trail (2016)
