= The Alternate Routes =

Rock band from Bridgeport, Connecticut

- Origin: Bridgeport, Connecticut; Fairfield University, Fairfield, Connecticut, United States
- Genres: Rock, roots rock, college rock
- Years active: 2002–present
- Label: Independent
- Members: Eric Donnelly; Tim Warren; Ian Tait; Kurt Leon; Taryn Chory
- Past members: Mike Sembos; Chip Johnson; Stephen Chopek; Richard Medek; David Grant; Mike Stavitz
- Website: thealternateroutes.com

The Alternate Routes are an American rock band based in Bridgeport, Connecticut. The group was formed by Tim Warren and Eric Donnelly in 2002 while studying at Fairfield University.

As of early 2013, The Alternate Routes were touring and working on a new album to follow up Lately.

== Career ==
In 2005, the band recorded their debut album, Good and Reckless and True, with producer Jay Joyce in Nashville, TN. The next few years were spent touring and honing their live sound.

In 2006, the band won an Independent Music Award for the song "Ordinary." Later that year, the band signed with Vanguard Records.

In 2007, the band re-released Good and Reckless and True on Vanguard, and released a limited-edition acoustic album. This album, available only at shows, was affectionately titled The Brooklawn Sessions, referring to the house where Tim and then bass player Chip Johnson lived and recorded the album. On April 10, 2007, the Alternate Routes performed their single "Time is a Runaway" on Late Night with Conan O'Brien.

In 2008, the band recorded their follow-up LP, Sucker's Dream, again with Jay Joyce in Nashville. While waiting for its release in February 2009, the band recorded a five-song EP, The Watershed EP, at Tarquin Studios with producer Peter Katis in their hometown of Bridgeport.

In 2010, longtime band member Chip Johnson left the band to pursue his home studio, Alpine Red.

The Alternate Routes parted ways with Vanguard Records in 2010 and shortly headed back to Nashville to begin work on their third studio album, Lately. Lately was produced by Teddy Morgan at Barrio East in Nashville over the course of 6 weeks. The album features drummer Richard Medek and multi-instrumentalist Carl Broemel of My Morning Jacket.

In the summer of 2011, the Alternate Routes toured with co-headliners Scattered Trees. The tour introduced the band's new four-piece lineup featuring drummer Richard Medek and longtime guitarist turned bassist Mike Sembos (also of The Backyard Committee).

On December 17, 2013, The Alternate Routes' new single "Nothing More" was featured in its full length during the final scenes of the Christmas episode of NCIS, earning them the #92 rank on the iTunes US charts.

The Alternate Routes released their fourth studio album, Nothing More, on September 30, 2013, with record producer Peter Katis.

"Nothing More" was featured in the closing ceremonies of the 2014 Winter Olympics on NBC. The band also performed "Nothing More" on The Late Late Show with Craig Ferguson in March 2014.

Nothing More featured at the end of documentary "Collective" about the 2015 fire at a concert in Romania (killing 27 and injuring 180), and the subsequent corruption scandal which brought down the government and following on from that the deaths of a further 37 victims in the hospitals which exposed widespread corruption and mismanagement in the Romanian healthcare system.

In 2019 the Alternate Routes hosted an event called The Alternate Routes Getaway. It has been running for 3 years with a break during 2020. Tony Lucca, Meaghan Farrell, and Amy Gerhartz have performed at the event, among others. The two day event is hosted in the Outerbanks of NC, once in Kitty Hawk and the last two times in Avon, NC.

== Members ==
=== Present ===
- Tim Warren – lead vocals, acoustic and electric guitars
- Eric Donnelly – electric guitars, backing vocals
- Ian Tait – bass guitar
- Kurt Leon – drums (2007–2008, then rejoined the band in 2012)
- Taryn Chory- Vocals

=== Previous ===
- Mike Sembos – bass guitar, backing vocals, electric guitar (2005–2013)
- Chip Johnson – bass, keys, backing vocals, drums (2003–2010)
- Stephen Chopek – drums (2005–2007)
- David Grant – drums (late 2008)
- Mike Stavitz – drums (2008–2010)
- Richard Medek – drums (2010–2011)

== Discography ==
=== Albums ===
- This Is When EP (2003)
- Over Your Shoulder EP (2004)
- Good and Reckless and True (2005)
- Good and Reckless and True (2007, re-released on Vanguard Records)
- The Watershed EP (2008)
- Sucker's Dream (2009)
- Live... in Seattle (2010)
- Lately (2010)
- Nothing More (2014)
- It's That Time EP (2014)
- Live In Pawling (2017)

=== Singles ===
- "Time Is a Runaway" (2007)
- "The Future's Nothing New" (2009)
- "Ain't No Secret" (2009)
- "Carry Me Home" (2011)
- "Nothing More" (2013)
- "Somewhere In America" (2016)
- "Safe Haven" (2017)
- "Stronger" (2017)
