= Martin Sexton =

American musician (born 1966)

- Born: March 2, 1966 (age 60); Syracuse, New York, U.S.
- Genres: Americana; rock; blue-eyed soul; folk
- Occupations: Musician, songwriter, producer
- Instruments: Vocals, guitar
- Years active: 1991–present
- Labels: Kitchen Table Records (KTR), Atlantic
- Website: martinsexton.com

Martin Sexton (born March 2, 1966) is an American singer-songwriter and music producer.

== Early life ==
Martin Sexton was born in 1966 in Syracuse, New York, as the tenth of twelve children in a working class Irish-American family. He grew up in the Strathmore neighborhood of Syracuse.

He acquired his first guitar, a Sears & Roebuck acoustic model, at age 14.

== Career ==
In 1988, Sexton moved to Boston, and began playing on street corners and at open mic nights around the city. Sexton released a collection of self-produced demo recordings in 1991 called In The Journey. The album was released on an 8-track cassette, and Sexton sold 15,000 copies to fans.

He was given the National Academy of Songwriters Artist of the Year Award in 1994. He released Black Sheep in 1996 (season 6 episode 11 of the TV sitcom Scrubs featured track #3, "Diner"), an album called The American in 1998, and another album called Wonder Bar in 2000. He launched his independent record label, Kitchen Table Records, in 2001 and released a concert album called Live Wide Open. His album, Seeds, was released in 2007.

In 2008, he released a second live album called Solo. Subsequent albums included Sugarcoating (2010), Fall Like Rain (2012). and Mixtape of the Open Road (2015).

In 2017, Martin joined Chris Anderson (upright and electric bass) and Boo Reiners (multi-string instruments) to make The Martin Sexton Trio.

Sexton's latest recording, "2020 Vision" was released on September 1, 2021.

Along with singing, Sexton also does scatting and beat-boxing in his music and whistling in his music and for other artists like Patty Larkin.

== Discography ==
=== Albums ===
- In the Journey (Koch Entertainment, 1992)
- Black Sheep (Koch International, 1996)
- The American (Atlantic Records, 1998)
- Live at the Fillmore (Atlantic Records, 1999)
- Wonder Bar (Atlantic Records, 2000)
- Live Wide Open (Kitchen Table, 2001)
- Live at Newbury Comics (Kitchen Table, 2003)
- Camp Holiday (Kitchen Table, 2005)
- Seeds (Kitchen Table, 2007)
- Solo (Kitchen Table, 2008)
- Sugarcoating (Kitchen Table, 2010)
- Mixtape of the Open Road (Kitchen Table, 2015)
- Live at the Belly Up (2017) – download only

=== Extended plays ===
- Fall Like Rain (Kitchen Table, 2012)
- 2020 Vision (Kitchen Table, 2021)

=== Charted singles ===
List of charted singles, with selected chart positions
Title	Year	Peak chart positions	Album
Title	Year	AUS	Album
"Love Keep Us Together"	1999	75	Black Sheep

=== Other contributions ===
- Live & Direct – Volume 1, WYEP-FM, Pittsburgh, Pennsylvania, (1999) – "The American"
- Live & Direct – Volume 3, WYEP-FM, Pittsburgh, Pennsylvania, (2001) – "Where Did I Go Wrong"
- Live at the World Café - Volume 9 (1999) – "The American"
