= Jazz Mandolin Project =

US acoustic jazz fusion group

The Jazz Mandolin Project
- Origin: Burlington, Vermont, U.S.
- Genres: Jam band, experimental jazz, jazz fusion
- Years active: 1993–present
- Members: Jamie Masefield; Jon Fishman; Danton Boller; Michael Mavridoglou
- Past members: Jamie Masefield; Stacy Starkweather; Gabe Jarrett; Jon Fishman; Chris Dahlgren; Ari Hoenig
- Website: www.jazzmandolinproject.com

The Jazz Mandolin Project is an acoustic jazz fusion group formed in Burlington, Vermont, United States, by Jamie Masefield in 1993.

Masefield played banjo with dixieland bands, including the Preservation Hall Jazz Band, before switching to mandolin. In 1996, the debut album consisted of Gabe Jarrett on drums and Stacy Starkweather on bass. The following year the group broke up, and Masefield kept the name with different musicians: bassist Chris Dahlgren and drummer Jon Fishman from Phish. They recorded the next album, Tour de Flux. Masefield described the band's music as " very contrapuntal stuff, like a three-way conversation".

The Project's next album, Xenoblast, was on Blue Note Records, although it was less a jazz album and more improvisational jazz rock, featuring the guitarist Trey Anastasio of Phish.

In 2003, they released a drum & bass-influenced album called Jungle Tango, which included Ari Hoenig and Danton Boller. In 2005, Masefield returned to a more acoustic sound with The Deep Forbidden Lake, which features cover versions of songs by Radiohead, Tom Waits, Leonard Cohen, and Django Reinhardt.

In 2026, they embarked on a new tour. It began in Burlington, VT, then hit Boston, Brooklyn, Kingston, and Jam Cruise.

== Discography ==
- The Jazz Mandolin Project (Accurate, 1996), (Lenapee, 2004)
- Tour de Flux (Accurate, 1999)
- Xenoblast (Blue Note, 2000), (EMI Digital, 2003)
- After Dinner Jams (Lenapee, 2001), (DKE, 2004)
- Jungle Tango (Lenapee, 2003)
- The Deep Forbidden Lake (Lenapee, 2005)

== Personnel ==
- Jamie Masefield — acoustic and electric mandolin, charango, and tenor banjo (All)
- Stacy Starkweather — electric and acoustic bass, effects, and mellotron (1996)
- Chris Dahlgren — double bass, imbera, and music box (1999, 2000)
- Danton Boller — acoustic and electric bass (2001, 2003, 2026)
- Greg Cohen — upright bass (2005)
- Gabriel Jarrett — drums and percussives (1996)
- Jon Fishman — drums and cuica (1999, 2026), piano (2001)
- Ari Hoenig — drums, piano (2000, 2001, 2003)
- Gil Goldstein — piano, accordion (2001, 2003, 2005)
- Chris Lovejoy — percussion (2001, 2003)
- Michael “Mad Dog” Mavridoglou - trumpet, piano (2026)
