= Ryan Montbleau =

American musician

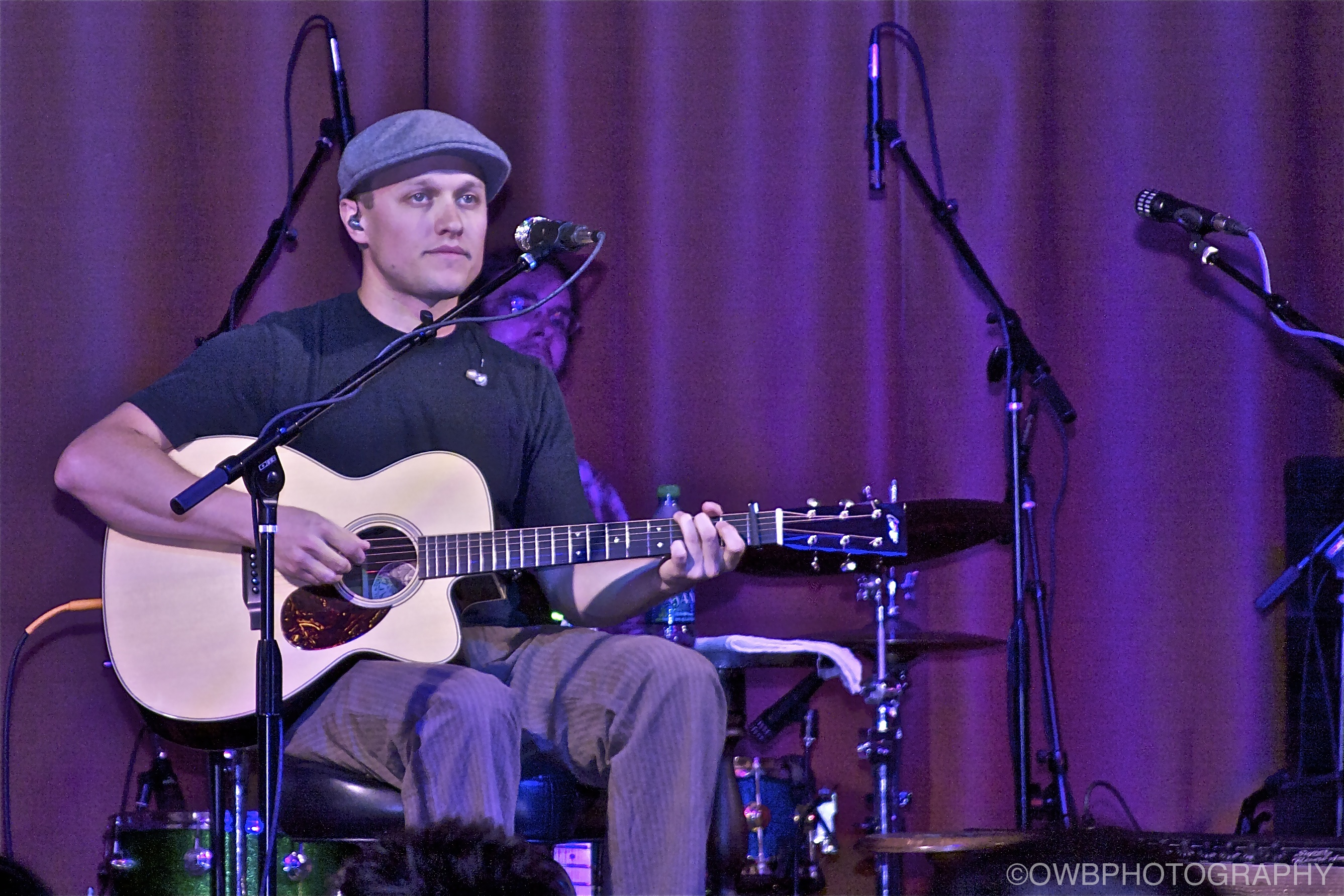

Background information
- Born: Ryan Michael Montbleau; June 18, 1977 (age 48); Peabody, Massachusetts
- Genres: Folk, blues, funk, Americana
- Occupation(s): Musician, songwriter
- Instrument(s): Vocals, guitar
- Years active: 1999–present
- Website: www.ryanmontbleau.com

Ryan Michael Montbleau (born June 18, 1977, in Peabody, Massachusetts, United States) is an American singer-songwriter and guitarist. He annually tours across the U.S. with the Ryan Montbleau Band.

== Background ==
Although he received his first guitar at age nine, it was not until attending college at Villanova University that he seriously began to focus on his playing and songwriting. After college, Montbleau began playing on his own at the House of Blues in Boston, where he started working in 1999. Eventually, Montbleau began performing his original music on-stage at the House of Blues and other Cambridge, Somerville, and Boston area coffee shops, folk and music venues, developing a local fan base. He occasionally performed his music with a percussion player, under the duo name "Palabra", before building what would become the Ryan Montbleau Band.

Montbleau eventually joined up with Matt Giannaros (acoustic upright bass, electric bass, backing vocals) Laurence Scudder (viola, backing vocals), Jason Cohen (piano, organ, clavinet, Moog synthesizer) and James Cohen (drums). In 2006 the group released its first collective album, One Fine Color. A sixth member, Yahuba Garcia Torres (percussion, backing vocals) toured frequently with the band. In February 2011 the band announced the departure of viola player, Laurence Scudder, and also the addition of guitarist Lyle Brewer. In October 2013 the Ryan Montbleau Band announced on their website that the current line up of members would be changing. Jason Cohen (piano, organ, clavinet, Moog synthesizer) and Lyle Brewer (guitar) left the band to focus on family. The Ryan Montbleau Band plays upwards of 200 gigs per year.

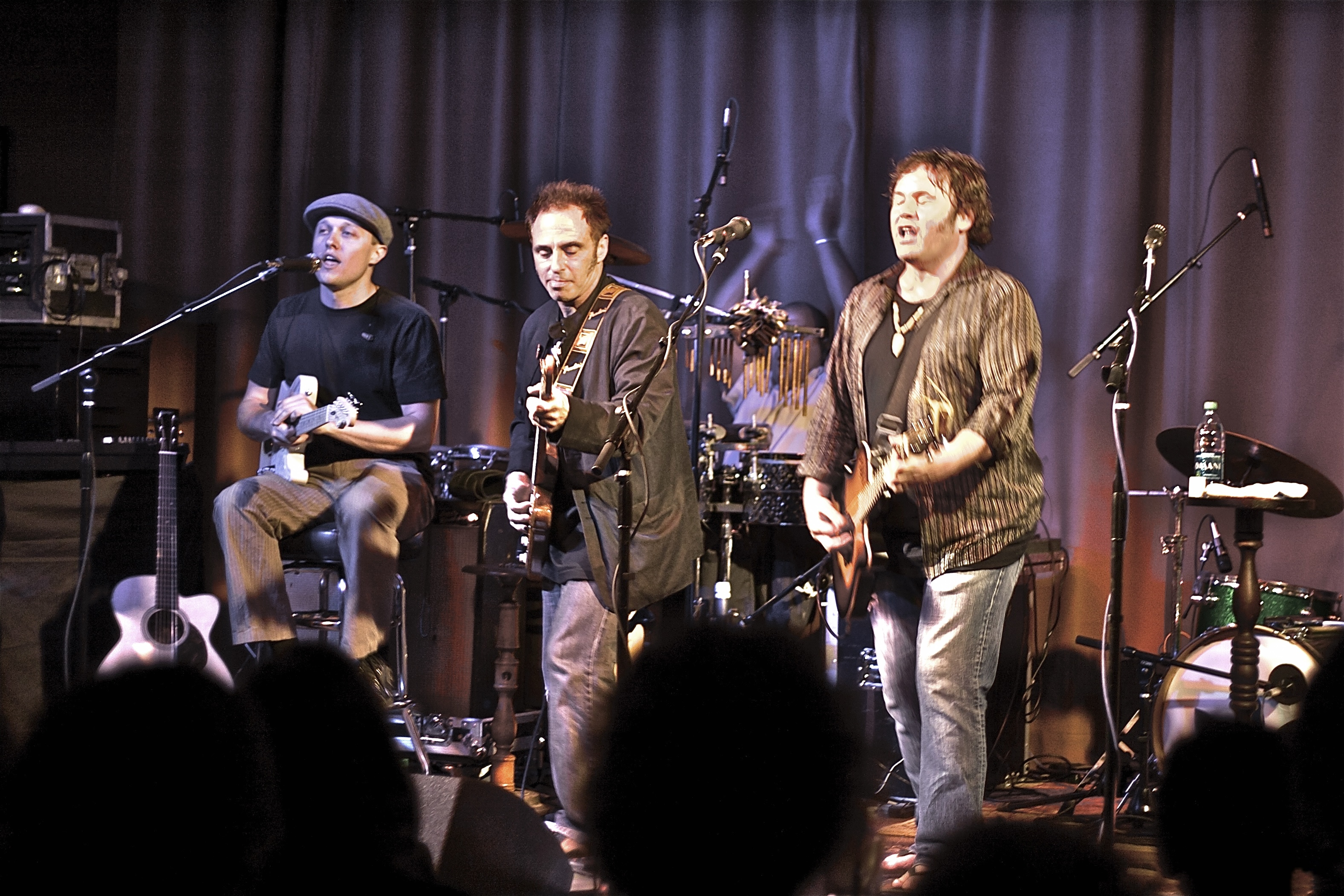
Ryan Montbleau Band in concert, 2010; L to R: Montbleau, Nils Lofgren, and Martin Sexton

Montbleau has opened solo/acoustic for John P. Hammond, Melissa Ferrick, Ani DiFranco, Martin Sexton, and Rodrigo y Gabriela. His band has also become a regular act included in the line-up at the Gathering of the Vibes music festival in Connecticut. In the spring of 2010 the Ryan Montbleau Band toured with Martin Sexton, as his backing band and opening band. Before departing for that tour, Sexton produced the RMB's album titled, Heavy On the Vine, recorded at Camp Street Studios in Cambridge, Massachusetts.

Ryan Montbleau partnered with frequent collaborator Hayley Jane, a fellow singer/songwriter, on the project Yes Darling beginning in 2017. Yes Darling has toured sporadically over the years to support their self-titled album that was released in 2018. Yes Darling's concerts are very theatrical and humorous.

== Awards ==
Montbleau was named the Best Local Male Vocalist in the 2007 Boston Music Awards. He also won second prize for performance in the 2007 International Songwriting Competition. Montbleau was nominated for a 2012 MTV Music Award for Best Concert Experience.

== Equipment ==
Montbleau plays a Collings acoustic guitar model OM2H Cut, and a G&L ASAT Classic electric guitar.

== Discography ==
- Begin (2002) – Solo
- Stages (2003) – Solo/live
- One Fine Color (2006)
- Patience on Friday (2007)
- Stages: Volume II (2009) – Solo/live
- Heavy On The Vine (2010)
- Live at Life is Good (2011) – Live
- For Higher (2012) – Solo
- All or Nothing / Fast Car (2014) (with Tall Heights)
- Growing Light (2015)
- Stages: Volume III (2016)
- I Was Just Leaving (2017)
- Wood, Fire, Water, and Air (2023)
