= Strangefolk =

American band

- Origin: Burlington, Vermont, United States
- Genres: Jam, rock, jazz, folk, progressive rock
- Years active: 1991–present
- Members: Jon Trafton (1991–present); Erik Glockler (1992–present); Reid Genauer (1991–2000, 2012–present); Luke Smith (1992–2004, 2012-present)
- Past members: Luke "Patchen" Montgomery (2000–2011); Don Scott (2001–2011); Russ Lawton (2004–2011)
- Website: http://www.strangefolk.com/

Strangefolk is an American rock-oriented jam band originally from Burlington, Vermont. Since forming in 1991, the band has released five studio albums, four live albums and one live concert DVD. The band consists of Jon Trafton (lead guitar, vocals), Erik Glockler (bass, vocals), Reid Genauer (rhythm guitar, vocals), and Luke Smith (drums).

== History ==
=== Formation and Early Years ===
Originally formed at the University of Vermont as an acoustic duo "Strange Folk" in 1991 by Jon Trafton and Reid Genauer, Strangefolk (now one word) added bass and drums in 1993 and took to playing the bars in and around the vibrant musical community of Burlington, Vermont. After only a couple of years of developing their signature sound in and around the Vermont music scene, the band began touring the club and college circuit around the Northeast, quickly gaining momentum and popularity with each tour. Regional tours paved the way for national tours, with the band logging over 100 shows per year.

=== Record Deal and Setbacks ===
In 1998, Strangefolk signed with Mammoth Records, only to have the record deal collapse when Disney purchased Mammoth in 1999. "A Great Long While", which was to be the band's major-label debut and was produced by Nile Rodgers, was released independently in 2000. The band faced setbacks and challenges due to the end of their record deal and the direction of the band, leading to founding member Reid Genauer leaving the band in September 2000.

=== Lineup Changes and Side Projects ===
After Reid Genauer's departure, Strangefolk underwent lineup changes and auditions, eventually inviting Luke "Patchen" Montgomery to join the band, along with keyboardist Scott Shdeed. The newly aligned group began touring again in early 2001. Don Scott replaced Shdeed on keyboards in October 2001. The band experienced another lineup change in September 2003 when drummer Luke Smith left for personal reasons. Following a brief hiatus, Trey Anastasio Band drummer Russ Lawton joined Strangefolk in April 2004.

During a period of hiatus and personal challenges, the band members engaged in side projects. In early 2005, while Jon Trafton underwent cancer treatment, the remaining members formed a side project called The Windfalls with guitarist Steve Jones of the band The Boneheads. The band faced Trafton's cancer diagnosis with overwhelming support and solidarity from family, friends, bandmates, and fans. Trafton eventually became cancer-free, and Strangefolk resumed regular performances in 2006.

=== The Tells and Cover Sets ===
At their Garden of Eden music festival in September 2006, the band debuted another side project called The Tells. The Tells consisted of all five members of Strangefolk and performed a late-night set of Led Zeppelin cover songs. The band continued this performance as The Tells in October 2006 and also performed themed sets at other festivals, including a Jack White-themed set at the StrangeCreek Festival in Greenfield, Massachusetts in September 2007.

=== Charitable Work ===
In 1997, fans of Strangefolk started a charitable organization called Strangers Helping Strangers (SHS), collecting non-perishable food items at the band's concerts throughout New England. SHS expanded to work with hundreds of other bands across the US, aiming to feed the hungry one concert at a time.

=== Strangefolk Reunion ===
On January 10, 2012, Strangefolk announced a pair of reunion shows with the original lineup, featuring Reid Genauer, Jon Trafton, Erik Glockler, and Luke Smith. These shows marked the first formal onstage reunion since their farewell Garden of Eden concert in September 2000. The original lineup sporadically performed concerts throughout the 2010s, including appearances at festivals and various venues including The Capitol Theatre in Port Chester, New York, Flynn Theatre in Burlington, Vermont and Terrapin Crossroads in Marin County, California.

In 2015, Strangefolk played a concert at the Jay Peak ski resort in Jay, Vermont. In 2016, the band returned to that site to host their first Garden of Eden festival since 2006. Strangefolk hosted the festival again at the same site in 2017, 2018 and 2019. A 2020 Garden of Eden festival was announced but was cancelled due to the COVID-19 pandemic.

In 2018, Reid Genauer released an album called Conspire To Smile. The title track featured all four original members of Strangefolk on a studio album for the first time since Genauer initially left the band in 2000.

=== Later Years and Current Activities ===
The two nights of the 2019 Garden of Eden festival were Strangefolk's final concerts for at least six years, with the hiatus expected to end with a Garden of Eden festival scheduled for August 2025. Since 2021, Jon Trafton, Erik Glockler, and Luke Smith have performed together with guitarist Steve Jones under the name J.E.L.S. Reid Genauer has been involved in various musical projects, including performing shows with Assembly of Dust and a new outfit called Reid Genauer and Folks, which features a rotating cast of supporting musicians.

During the first half of the 2020s, prior to the Eden 2025 announcement, there were no official plans for Strangefolk to reunite or perform again. However, the band did not officially disband during this time, leaving open the possibility of future collaborations or performances.

Throughout their history, Strangefolk has left a lasting impact not only through their music but also through their charitable work with Strangers Helping Strangers. The organization continues to work with numerous bands across the United States, striving to make a positive difference by addressing hunger issues one concert at a time.

Despite the band's evolution, lineup changes, and individual pursuits, Strangefolk's unique sound and contributions to the music scene, particularly in Vermont, have left a lasting legacy. Their performances and reunion shows have been celebrated by fans, and their music continues to resonate with audiences who appreciate their blend of acoustic, folk, and rock elements.

== Line-up ==
(1991–1992)	Jon Trafton - lead guitar, vocals; Reid Genauer - rhythm guitar, vocals
(1992-Sept 2000)	Jon Trafton - lead guitar, vocals; Reid Genauer - rhythm guitar, vocals; Erik Glockler - bass guitar, vocals; Luke Smith - drums
(Nov 2000-Oct 2001)	Jon Trafton - lead guitar, vocals; Erik Glockler - bass guitar, vocals; Luke Smith - drums; Luke "Patchen" Montgomery - rhythm guitar, lead guitar, vocals; Scott Shdeed - keyboards
(Oct 2001-Dec 2004)	Jon Trafton - lead guitar, vocals; Erik Glockler - bass guitar, vocals; Luke Smith - drums; Luke "Patchen" Montgomery - rhythm guitar, lead guitar, vocals; Don Scott - keyboards, vocals
(Apr 2004–May 2012)	Jon Trafton - lead guitar, vocals; Erik Glockler - bass guitar, vocals; Luke "Patchen" Montgomery - rhythm guitar, lead guitar, vocals; Don Scott - keyboards, vocals; Russ Lawton - drums
(Mar 2012–present)	Jon Trafton - lead guitar, vocals; Reid Genauer - rhythm guitar, vocals; Erik Glockler - bass guitar, vocals; Luke Smith - drums

== Discography ==
- Strangefolk (also referred to as "Demo") (1994)
- Lore (1995)
- Weightless in Water (1998)
- Live (EP) (2000)
- A Great Long While (2000)
- Open Road (2001)
- Coast 2 Coast (Live) (2002)
- Coast 2 Coast: Volume 2 (Live) (2003)
- Live at the Capitol Theatre Port Chester, NY 12/27/98 (Live) (2012)
- Live Live At The Palladium 11/27/99 (2018)

== Videography ==
- Garden of Eden 2002 (DVD) (2003)
