= The Peach Music Festival =

American music festival

Coordinates: 41.34765°N 75.66335°W

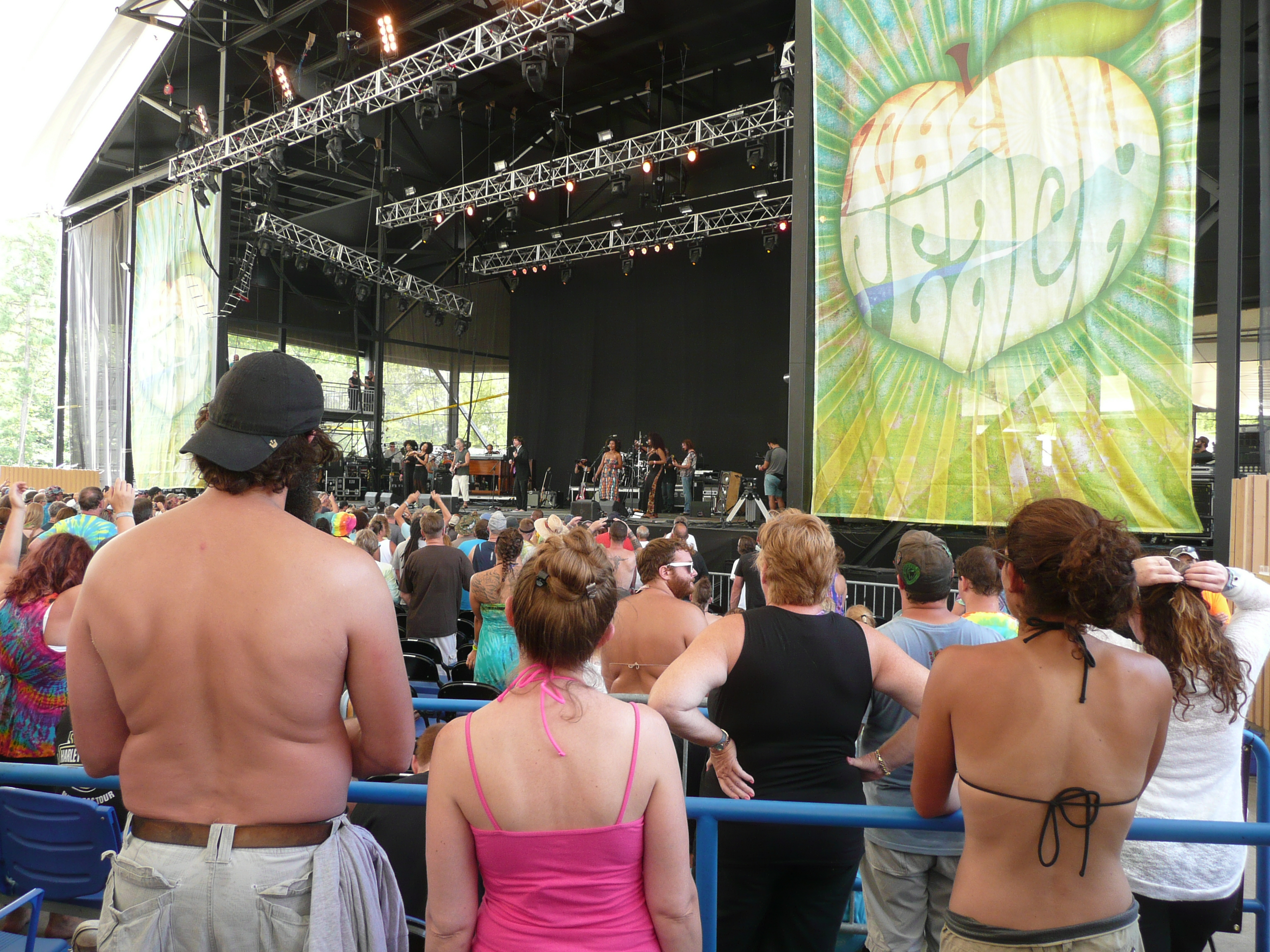
- Peach Stage, Peach Festival 2015
- Genre: Alternative rock, americana, bluegrass, blues, blues rock, boogie rock, classic rock, country, folk, funk, jam band, jazz, jazz fusion, psychedelic rock, reggae, rock, roots rock, soul, Southern rock
- Dates: Mid-August
- Location: Scranton, Pennsylvania
- Years active: 2012–2019, 2021–2023
- Founders: The Allman Brothers Band
- Website: Official website

The Peach Music Festival is a music festival started by the Allman Brothers Band and produced by Live Nation Entertainment that has been held annually since 2012 at the Pavilion at Montage Mountain and Montage Mountain Ski Resort in Scranton, Pennsylvania. It had been held every year since its inception, except in 2020.

== History ==
The Peach Music Festival was billed as the first ever Allman Brothers-inspired music festival in northeastern Pennsylvania, and attracts thousands of people each year. Festival-goers are encouraged to shop at the many food and craft vendors on the grounds of the festival and are offered free access to the Montage Mountain Ski Resort. Which is transformed into a large water park in the summer months, allowing festival goers to use the park's many water rides and attractions while listening to the musicians performing. Camping and RV Parking is also offered on the grounds. The festival takes place in late-July over the course of four days, from Thursday to Sunday, and has a variety of different musical performers, and special events each day.

The COVID-19 pandemic in 2020 caused the 9th to be cancelled and deferred to 2021. The 2024 edition of the festival was cancelled.

== Festival lineups ==
=== 2023 ===
The Peach Music Festival 2023 took place from June 29 to July 2, headlined by Tedeschi Trucks Band, Goose, My Morning Jacket and Ween.

Official lineup:
- Ally Venable
- Andy Frasco & The U.N.
- Baked Shrimp
- Taz Plays Hendrix
- Brother and Sister
- Brown Eyed Women - An All-Female Tribute to The Grateful Dead
- Christone "Kingfish" Ingram
- Circles Around The Sun
- Couch
- Cris Jacobs Band
- Daniel Donato
- Dogs In A Pile
- Duane Betts
- Friends of The Brothers
- Ghost Light
- Goose
- Hans Williams
- Jaimoe & Friends
- JB Strauss
- JD Simo
- Joe Russo’s Almost Dead
- Jupiter & Okwess
- Kanika Moore Presents The Broadband
- Karina Rykman
- Kendall Street Company
- Lawrence
- Les Claypool's Fearless Flying Frog Brigade
- Lettuce
- Little Bird
- LP Giobbi
- Magic City Hippies
- Melt
- Mihali
- Mike Gordon
- Mo Lowda & the Humble
- Muscle Tough
- My Morning Jacket
- Oh He Dead
- One Time Weekend
- Parrotfish
- Proper Tea
- Quinn Sullivan
- RAQ
- Ripe
- RoastJohn
- Son Little
- Taper's Choice
- Tauk
- Tedeschi Trucks Band
- The Australian Pink Floyd Show
- The Mountain Grass Unit
- The National Reserve
- The Psycodelics
- The Sweet Lillies
- Thumpasaurus
- Trouble No More
- Twiddle
- Umphrey's McGee
- Veronica Lewis
- Wax Owls
- Ween
- Will Evans
- Yam Yam
- Ziggy Marley

=== 2022 ===
The Peach Music Festival 2022 took place from June 30 to July 3, headlined by Billy Strings, Joe Russo’s Almost Dead, Trey Anastasio Band and Black Crowes.

Official lineup:
- Andy Frasco & The U.N.
- Billy Strings
- Bobby Lee Rodgers
- Brandon "Taz" Niederauer & Friends
- Brother & Sister
- Carly Moffa
- Celisse
- Chalk Dinosaur
- Consider The Source
- Cordovas
- Cycles
- Daniel Donato & Friends
- Daniel Donato's Cosmic Country
- Dogs In A Pile
- Doom Flamingo
- Dry Reef
- Duane Betts
- Eggy
- Eric Krasno & The Assembly
- Evanoff
- Friends Of The Brothers
- Funk You
- G. Love & The Juice
- GA-20
- Goose
- Great Time
- Hannah Wicklund
- Jaimoe & Friends
- Jason Bonham's Led Zeppelin Evening
- JB Strauss
- JD Simo
- Joe Russo’s Almost Dead
- Karina Rykman
- Keller Williams
- Kitchen Dwellers
- Lacuna (Tom Hamilton & Holly Bowling)
- Little Stranger
- Maggie Rose
- Marco Benevento
- Melt
- Midnight North
- Miss Mojo
- Muskrat Lighting
- Neighbor
- Nick Perri
- One Time Weekend
- Pigeons Playing Ping Pong
- Pixie & The Partygrass Boys
- Rayland Baxter
- Ripe
- Samantha Fish
- Sicard Hollow
- Snacktime
- Spaga
- Star Kitchen
- Steel Pulse
- Tand
- Tauk
- The Black Crowes
- The Bogie Band Ft. Joe Russo
- The Jauntee
- The Motet
- The Nth Power Ft. Jennifer Hartswick
- The Revivalists
- The Shady Recruits
- The Wailers
- The Wild Feathers
- The Word
- Trey Anastasio Band
- Trouble No More
- Wax Owls

=== 2021 ===
After the 2020 event was canceled due to the COVID-19 pandemic, The Peach Music Festival 2021 took place from July 1 to July 4, and headlined by Pigeons Playing Ping Pong (2 sets), Joe Russo’s Almost Dead (2 sets), Oysterhead, and The String Cheese Incident (2 sets).

Official lineup:
- Oysterhead
- The String Cheese Incident
- Joe Russo’s Almost Dead
- Warren Haynes
- Umphrey’s Mcgee
- moe.
- Pigeons Playing Ping Pong
- Oteil & Friends
- Twiddle
- Turkuaz
- Blackberry Smoke
- Doom Flamingo
- The Allman Betts Band
- Jaimoe & Friends
- The Wild Feathers
- Spafford
- Dopapod
- Keller Williams
- Brandon "Taz" Niederauer
- Live At Fillmore East (50th Anniversary)
- Neal Francis
- Scott Sharrard & Friends (The Peach Guitar Pull)
- Andy Frasco & The U.N.
- Tauk
- Aqueous
- Ghost Light
- Ballyhoo!
- Nicole Atkins
- Cordovas
- The Blind Boys Of Alabama
- Kitchen Dwellers
- The Shady Recruits
- Mikaela Davis
- Thumpasaurus
- Magic Beans
- Los Colognes
- Karina Rykman
- Nick Perri And The Underground Thieves
- CBDB
- Yak Attack
- Funk You
- Keznamdi
- The Fritz
- Eggy
- Dizgo
- Gabriel Kelley
- Serene Green
- Yam Yam
- Bobby Lee Rodgers
- Great Peacock
- Ida Mae
- Mike Love
- Chris Roberts
- Sicard Hollow
- JB Strauss
- Celisse
- New Madrid
- Magnolia Boulevard
- Neighbor
- Samantha Fish

=== 2019 ===
The Peach Music Festival 2019 took place from July 25-28, headlined by String Cheese Incident (3 sets), Trey Anastasio Band (2 sets) and Phil Lesh & Friends.

Official lineup:
- Phil Lesh & Friends
- Trey Anastasio Band
- The String Cheese Incident
- Joe Russo’s Almost Dead
- Aqueous
- Billy Strings
- moe.
- Pigeons Playing Ping Pong
- Lotus
- Blues Traveler
- Warren Haynes & Grace Potter
- Inaugural Peach Guitar Pull
- The Infamous Stringdusters
- Blackberry Smoke
- Greensky Bluegrass
- Lettuce
- Stephen Marley
- Jaimoe's Jasssz Band
- The Motet
- Cory Wong (of Vulfpeck)
- The Allman Betts Band
- Larkin Poe
- Magic City Hippies
- Big Something
- Dopapod
- Southern Avenue
- Bumpin Uglies
- Upstate
- Joe Hertler & The Rainbow Seekers
- Kat Wright
- Cycles
- Hayley Jane & The Primates
- Maggie Rose
- Ghost Light
- Fruition
- Andy Frasco & The U.N.
- Percy Hill
- Organ Freeman
- Kitchen Dwellers
- Mungion
- Goose
- Thumpasaurus
- Bobby Lee Rodgers
- Magic Beans
- Michigan Rattlers
- The Marcus King Band
- Yonder Mountain String Band
- Joanne Shaw Taylor
- Bishop Gunn
- Leah Blevins

=== 2018 ===
The Peach Music Festival 2018 was held July 19-22. Headliners were Phil Lesh & the Terrapin Family Band, Gov't Mule, and JRAD. A late night set with "Dark Side Of The Mule" was also featured, and Dickey Betts and his band were joined by his son Duane.

Official lineup:
- Twiddle
- Pigeons Playing Ping Pong
- Turkuaz
- The Marcus King Band
- Cabinet
- Phil Lesh & The Terrapin Family Band
- Umphrey’s McGee
- The Revivalists
- Moe.
- Twiddle & Friends
- Michael Franti & Spearhead
- Jaimoe’s Jasssz Band
- Leftover Salmon
- Karl Denson’s Tiny Universe
- ZZ Ward
- Anders Osborne & Jackie Greene
- The Suffers
- Big Something
- The Main Squeeze
- Magic Beans
- Midnight North
- Kitchen Dwellers
- Bobby Lee Rodgers
- Litz
- The Blue Stones
- Hayley Jane & The Primates
- Gov’t Mule
- Joe Russo’s Almost Dead
- Little Feat
- Blackberry Smoke
- The Chris Robinson Brotherhood
- Spafford
- The Devon Allman Project w/Duane Betts
- Band of Changes — Harford, Metzger, Dreiwitz & Russo
- Third World
- Nicki Bluhm
- Aqueous
- Ghost Light featuring Holly Bowling
- Tom Hamilton & guests
- Brandon “Taz” Niederauer
- Gatos Blancos
- Driftwood
- Mo Lowda & The Humble
- The Commonheart
- Flux Capacitor
- Thorp Jenson
- Funky Dawgz Brass Band
- Juice
- Gov’t Mule
- Dickey Betts & His Band
- Wakeup With Warren Haynes
- Oteil & Friends
- Dumpstaphunk
- Organ Freeman
- Soule Monde
- JP Biondo
- Bishop Gunn

=== 2017 ===
The Peach Music Festival 2017 was held from August 10-13. Headliners were Widespread Panic (2 nights), My Morning Jacket, Govt. Mule & Friends, Joe Bonamassa, Umphrey’s Mcgee (2 sets), and Joe Russo’s Almost Dead (2 sets).

Official lineup:
- Widespread Panic
- My Morning Jacket
- Gov’t Mule & Friends
- Joe Bonamassa
- Umphrey’s McGee
- Joe Russo’s Almost Dead
- Mike Gordon
- Lettuce Featuring Chaka Khan
- Les Brers
- Jaimoe’s Jasssz Band
- Dark Star Orchestra
- Rich Robinson’s The Magpie Salute
- God Street Wine
- Rusted Root
- Papadosio
- Dopapod Orchestra
- Steve Kimock & Friends
- The Record Company
- The Marcus King Band
- The Soul Rebels
- Pigeons Playing Ping Pong
- The New Mastersounds
- Fruition
- The Werks featuring Lettuce’s Shady Horns
- Eric Krasno Band
- Whiskey Myers
- Pink Talking Fish
- Giant panda Guerilla Dub Squad
- Aqueous
- The Hip Abduction
- Moonalice
- Butcher Brown
- Spafford
- Tom Hamilton’s American Babies
- Holly Bowling
- Mungion
- The Jauntee
- Lespecial
- Ghost Of Paul Revere
- Scott Sharrard & The Brickyard Band
- Gabriel Kelley
- Caverns
- The Steppin Stones
- Elise Testone
- Bobby Lee Rogers

=== 2016 ===
The Peach Music Festival 2016 was from August 11–14. Headliners were Trey Anastasio Band, Gregg Allman, String Cheese Incident, Gov't Mule and a collective set by Allman and String Cheese Incident.

Official lineup:
- Trey Anastasio Band
- Gregg Allman
- The String Cheese Incident
- The Gregg Allman Incident
- The Claypool Lennon Delirium
- Umphrey’s McGee
- moe.
- Warren Haynes
- Les Brers
- Jaimoe’s Jasssz Band
- Joe Russo’s Almost Dead
- Charles Bradley & His Extraordinaires
- Blackberry Smoke
- Toots & the Maytals
- Railroad Earth
- Dark Star Orchestra
- Karl Denson’s Tiny Universe
- Electron
- Anders Osborne
- Dopapod
- Twiddle
- The Floozies
- The Motet
- The Werks
- Golden Gate Wingmen
- Cabinet
- Turkuaz
- Sister Sparrow & the Dirty Birds
- Rayland Baxter
- Black Pistol Fire
- Flux Capacitor
- Bobby Lee Rodgers Trio
- Horseshoes & Hand Grenades
- Pimps of Joytime
- American Babies
- Brownout Presents Black Sabbath
- Pigeons Playing Ping Pong
- Zach Deputy
- Roots of Creation
- Aqueous
- Consider the Source
- Cornmeal
- Kingbaby
- Big Something
- The Magic Beans
- Driftwood
- The Social Animals
- Broccoli Samurai
- Uonize
- The Primate Fiasco
- Spiritual Rez]
- Flightschool
- Funky Dawgz Brass Band
- George Wesley

=== 2015 ===
The Peach Music Festival 2015 took place from August 13 to August 16, headlined by Gregg Allman, Santana and a special version of Bill Kreutzmann’s Billy & The Kids featuring the drummer’s Grateful Dead band mate Bob Weir. The Allman Brothers performed without Derek Trucks.

Official lineup:
- Gregg Allman
- Santana
- Bob Weir
- Billy & The Kids
- Willie Nelson & Family
- Warren Haynes
- Railroad Earth
- Jaimoe's Jasssz Band
- Butch Trucks
- Bruce Hornsby & The Noisemakers
- Lotus
- Old Crow Medicine Show
- G. Love & Special Sauce
- Trombone Shorty & Orleans Avenue
- Beats Antique
- Dark Star Orchestra
- Papadosio
- Joe Russo’s Almost Dead
- Oteil & Roosevelt
- Rusted Root
- Dumpstaphunk
- Dopapod
- Tweed
- Cabinet
- The Werks
- Twiddle
- Kung Fu
- Bobby Lee Rodgers
- Preservation Hall Jazz Band
- Keller Williams' Grateful Gospel

=== 2014 ===
The third annual Peach Music Festival took place on August 14–17. The festival was scheduled to be headlined by The Allman Brothers, Bob Weir & RatDog, and Trey Anastasio Band. For unspecified reasons, Bob Weir canceled summer tour dates ranging from August 14 through September 14. As a result, the Trey Anastasio Band received an extra headlining slot on Friday night. The festival featured a set in which The Allman Brothers Band performed the Eat A Peach album in its entirety. This was especially notable because it would be the second to last time the band would perform a festival with the guitarist duo of Derek Trucks and Warren Haynes (the final festival performance being the Lockn' Festival a month later). According to interviews with Rolling Stone, both guitarists decided to focus on their other projects. Derek Trucks said "I feel that my solo project and the Tedeschi Trucks Band is where my future and creative energy lies...The Tedeschi Trucks Band tour schedule keeps growing, and I feel the time has finally come to focus on a single project, which will allow me to spend that rare time off the road with my family and children. It's a difficult decision to make, and I don't make it lightly.” Following the conclusion of Eat A Peach, The Allman Brothers encored with the song "Little Martha," which served as a heartfelt tribute to the band's deceased co-founder Duane Allman.

Official lineup:
- The Allman Brothers Band
- Bob Weir & RatDog (cancelled)
- Trey Anastasio Band
- Tedeschi Trucks Band
- Gov't Mule
- Warren Haynes
- Rich Robinson
- Big Gigantic
- The Taj Mahal Trio
- George Clinton and Parliament-Funkadelic
- Trigger Hippy
- Victor Wooten
- BoomBox
- Lotus
- Jaimoe's Jasssz Band
- The Greyboy Allstars
- Blackberry Smoke
- JJ Grey & MOFRO
- The Infamous Stringdusters
- Bobby Lee Rodgers
- Tribal Seeds
- The Wood Brothers
- The Soul Rebels
- Particle
- The London Souls
- The Werks
- Consider the Source
- Tom Graham
- Alan Paul
- Cabinet
- The George Wesley Band
- Galadrielle Allman
- Zoogma
- Nick Bluhm and The Gramblers
- Papadosio
- The Revivalists
- MiZ
- Dopapod
- From Good Homes
- The Vegabonds
- American Babies
- Citizens Band Radio
- Aqueous
- Jimkata
- Pigeons Playing Ping Pong
- Flux Capacitor
- Big Leg Emma
- Flightschool
- Cherokee Red
- Cubical Sunrise

=== 2013 ===
Official lineup:
- The Allman Brothers Band
- Bob Weir & RatDog
- The Black Crowes
- Gov't Mule
- Bob Weir Solo Acoustic Session
- Lotus
- Grace Potter and the Nocturnals
- Jaimoe's Jasssz Band
- Railroad Earth
- Galactic
- Karl Denson's Tiny Universe
- Rusted Root
- Donavon Frankenreiter
- Floodwood featuring Al Schnier and Vinnie Amico
- Dirty Dozen Brass Band
- Greensky Bluegrass
- Royal Southern Brotherhood
- Giant Panda Guerilla Dub Squad
- Matt Schofield
- Bill Evans' Soulgrass
- Bobby Lee Rodgers
- Tauk
- Dopapod
- MiZ
- Cabinet
- Tom Graham
- The Vagabonds

=== 2012 ===
The Allman Brothers Band hosted the first annual Peach Music Festival at Montage Mountain in Scranton, Pennsylvania from August 10–12. In addition to the Allmans and their extended network of bands, the three-day event featured additional acts from the jam, rock, blues and country worlds.

Official lineup:
- The Allman Brothers Band
- Zac Brown Band
- Tedeschi Trucks Band
- O.A.R.
- Warren Haynes Band
- Jaimoe's Jasssz Band
- Railroad Earth
- Blackberry Smoke
- Dark Star Orchestra
- The Wailers Band
- Rebelution
- Robert Randolph and the Family Band
- The Blind Boys of Alabama
- Southside Johnny & The Asbury Jukes
- Ivan Neville's Dumpstaphunk
- Trigger Hippy
- JD & the Straight Shot
- Toubab Krewe
- Grimace Federation
- Tauk
- Cabinet
- 61 North
- MiZ

== See also ==
- List of music festivals in the United States
- List of blues festivals
