= Ghost Light (band) =

American rock band

- Origin: Philadelphia, Pennsylvania, United States
- Genres: Indie, Rock, jam band
- Years active: 2017-2023
- Members: Tom Hamilton; Raina Mullen; Scotty Zwang; Taylor Shell
- Past members: Holly Bowling; Steve Lyons; Dan Africano
- Website: www.ghostlightband.com

Ghost Light is a five-piece American jam band formed in 2017 by Tom Hamilton (Brothers Past, American Babies, Joe Russo's Almost Dead), Raina Mullen, Holly Bowling, Scotty Zwang (Dopapod, RAQ), and Steve Lyons (Nicos Gun). Ghost Light's debut album, Best Kept Secrets, was named one of Glide's top 20 albums of 2019. Ghost Light has performed on major festival stages and in historic venues including Lockn' Festival, Jam Cruise, Electric Forest Festival, Mission Ballroom, Brooklyn Bowl, The Peach Music Festival and Terrapin Crossroads. Ghost Light toured as an opening act for Greensky Bluegrass in the winter of 2020.

== History ==
Ghost Light was formed at the end of 2017 with two established mainstays in the jam band music scene, Tom Hamilton & Holly Bowling. The original assembly of the band occurred in a studio in Philadelphia, PA. This allowed the band to bond and grow through the music writing process. Unlike most Jam Bands, Ghost Light decided to start by recording an album before ever playing a live show. The band launched their first tour with a sold-out show in San Diego, CA and performed in over 25 venues across the United States throughout 2018.

In March 2019, original bassist Steve Lyons was replaced by Dan Africano from the band John Brown's Body.

On March 22, 2019, Ghost Light released their debut album 'Best Kept Secrets'. At their show that night in Minneapolis, MN they performed the album in its entirety. Ghost Light played 59 shows in 2019 and had 20 scheduled performances for 2020.

In March 2022, the band announced that bassist Dan Africano departed the group and was replaced by Turkuaz founding member Taylor Shell.

In August 2022, the band announced their sophomore album 'The Healing' which was released in October.

Holly Bowling announced in December 2022 that she would be leaving the band at the end of the year, performing her final show on December 29 in Denver.

The band performed their last show at the Peach Music Festival on July 7, 2023 with Tom McKee (American Babies) on keyboards.

== Critical response ==
Andy J. Gordon described Ghost Light's improvisational live show at the Teragram Ballroom as having "reached glorious synchronicity that has made their recent live shows a revelation."

Doug Collette described Best Kept Secrets as "a purposeful, cogent statement on the part of these seasoned musicians."

Mint described the album as "a trippy set of songs that are light and delicate but also intricate and engrossing," recommending especially the "Keep Your Hands To Yourself" track.

Ben Beamish wrote, "While some music conveys an artist's message, this one seems to want to incite a response from its audience" in his review of Best Kept Secrets.

== Band members ==
Final lineup

- Tom Hamilton – guitar, vocals (2017–2023)
- Raina Mullen – guitar, vocals (2017–2023)
- Scotty Zwang – drums, backing vocals (2017–2023)
- Taylor Shell – bass (2022–2023)

Former members

- Holly Bowling – keyboards, backing vocals (2017–2022)
- Steve Lyons – bass, backing vocals (2017–2019)
  - Is the bassist on the debut album 'Best Kept Secrets' though the album was released after he left the band.
- Dan Africano – bass (2019-2022)
  - Is the bassist on the sophomore album 'The Healing' though the album was released after he left the band.

== Discography ==
=== Studio albums ===
- Best Kept Secrets
- The Healing (2022-10-07)

=== Live recordings ===
- live concert recordings available on the Internet Archives' Live Music Archive (free)
- concert recordings available on nugs.net

=== Selected performances and shows ===
- Ghost Light at Terrapin Crossroads in San Rafael, CA 3/24/18
- Ghost Light at The Acoustic in Bridgeport, CT 4/13/18
- Ghost Light at Jamcruise 18 01/10/2020
