= Best Kept Secrets (Ghost Light album) =

Studio album by Ghost Light
- Released: March 22, 2019
- Recorded: December 2017 - April 2018
- Studios: Rittenhouse Soundworks - Philadelphia, PA
- Length: 36:55

Best Kept Secrets is the debut studio album by Philadelphia-based jam band Ghost Light. It was released on March 22, 2019.

== Background and recording ==
Ghost Light formed out of the ashes of guitarist Tom Hamilton's previous group, American Babies. Hamilton and American Babies vocalist/guitarist Raina Mullen spent a few weeks together coming up with songs and musical inspiration for a potential new band. According to Hamilton, "Twice a week for a few months, Raina and I would eat acid and just work in the studio all night".

With Mullen and a batch of new songs in tow, he assembled together keyboardist Holly Bowling, Dopapod drummer Scotty Zwang, and Nicos Gun bassist Steve Lyons in the studio to work on the new project.

== Release and reception ==
On February 15, 2019, the band announced the album and released the first single "Best Kept Secret".

The album premiered on Atwood Magazine the day before its official release, with writer Ben Beamish lauding the album's politically charged and personal lyrics while noting "those who aren't into politics or world events will also find enjoyment listening to the album and simply absorbing the sonic frenzy from beginning to end".

Relix's Ryan Reed called the album "equally heady and fun" and said "the album is defined by cinematic surprises and stylistic detours".

== Track listing ==
No.	Title	Writer(s)	Length
1.	"Elegy"	Bowling	2:55
2.	"Don't Come Apart Just Yet, My Dear"	Pete Tramo, Mullen, Lyons, Hamilton	5:38
3.	"Diamond Eyes"	Mullen, Hamilton	3:49
4.	"Isosceles"	Tramo, Hamilton	4:22
5.	"Beyond/Before"	Tramo, Hamilton	3:22
6.	"Keep Your Hands to Yourself"	Mullen, Hamilton	4:19
7.	"If Only, For Now"	Hamilton	2:45
8.	"Doorway to a Silent Chamber"	Bowling, Tramo, Mullen, Lyons,	4:19
9.	"Best Kept Secret"	Mullen, Hamilton	5:20
