= Best Kept Secret =

Best Kept Secret or Best Kept Secrets may refer to:

== Music ==
- Best Kept Secret (Chris Ardoin album), 2000
- Best Kept Secret (Jennifer Paige album), 2008
- Best Kept Secret (Louieville Sluggah album), 2010
- Best Kept Secret (Sheena Easton album), 1983
- Best Kept Secret (Slum Village album), 2000
- Best Kept Secret, a 2011 album by Soopafly
- Best Kept Secret, a 1978 album by Alquin
- Best Kept Secret, a demo album by Leona Lewis
- "Best Kept Secret" (song), by Didrik Solli-Tangen, 2010
- The Best Kept Secret (Alphrisk album), 2004
- The Best Kept Secret (Jerry Douglas album), 2005
- The Best Kept Secret (Ultramagnetic MCs album), 2007
- Best Kept Secrets (Ghost Light album), 2019
- Best Kept Secrets: The Best of Lamb 1996–2004

== Other uses ==
- Best Kept Secret (film), a 2013 American documentary
- Best Kept Secret (festival), in the Netherlands since 2013
- Best Kept Secret (novel), by Jeffrey Archer, 2013
- Best Kept Secret (production team), American music production duo
- Best Kept Secrets with Lele Pons, a weekly podcast from 2020
- Kareem Reid (born 1975), American basketball player, nicknamed The Best Kept Secret

== See also ==
- B-Ball's Best Kept Secret, a 1994 compilation album featuring NBA players
- The Best Little Secrets Are Kept, an album by Louis XIV
