= Lockn' Festival =

Music festival in Virginia, United States

Lockn' Festival (Interlocken Music Festival)
- Genre: Jam band
- Location: Arrington, Virginia
- Years active: 2013–2019, 2021
- Founders: Dave Frey of H.O.R.D.E. festival and his partner Peter Shapiro of Relix magazine
- Website: locknfestival.com

Lockn' Festival, first known as Interlocken Music Festival, was an annual four-day music festival held at Oak Ridge Farm near Arrington in Nelson County, Virginia. The festival focused primarily on jam bands and other music improvisation acts. Its inaugural event took place on September 5–8, 2013, drew nearly 25,000 fans and featured notable groups such as Furthur, Trey Anastasio Band, Gov't Mule, Widespread Panic featuring John Fogerty, the String Cheese Incident featuring Zac Brown, and the Black Crowes.

The Tedeschi Trucks Band, who performed at six editions of the festival, have released two live tribute albums that were recorded at Lockn' featuring covers of Derek and the Dominos' Layla and Other Assorted Love Songs and Joe Cocker's Mad Dogs & Englishmen in their entirety. Layla Revisited (Live at Lockn') was performed at the 2019 festival and released on July 16, 2021, and Mad Dogs & Englishmen Revisited (Live at Lockn') was performed alongside Leon Russell at the 2015 festival and was released on September 12, 2025.

== Lineups by year ==
=== 2013 ===
The Black Crowes (2 days), Col. Bruce Hampton & Friends, Dirty Dozen Brass Band, Eric Krasno, Founding Fathers, Furthur (3 days), Gov't Mule, Grace Potter, the Hackensaw Boys, Indecision, Jeff Sipe Trio, Jimmy Cliff, John Fogerty, Jorma Kaukonen, Keller & The Keels, the London Souls, Love Canon, Oteil Burbridge, Pegi Young & The Survivors, Punch Brothers, the Soul Rebels, the String Cheese Incident (2 days), Tedeschi Trucks Band, Trey Anastasio Band, Warren Haynes Band, Widespread Panic (2 days), Zac Brown.

- Neil Young was scheduled to perform but cancelled his appearance.

=== 2014 ===
The Allman Brothers Band, Bill Kreutzmann's Locknstep Allstars, Bustle In Your Hedgegrow, Cabinet, Chris Robinson Brotherhood, Del McCoury Band, Derek Trucks & Susan Tedeschi (acoustic), Drive-By Truckers, Dumpstaphunk, Erin And The Wildfire, Freeman, Gary Clark Jr., Grace Potter & The Nocturnals, Hot Tuna, James "J.T." Taylor, Keller Williams' Grateful Gospel, Keller Williams' Grateful Grass, Larry Keel & Sam Bush, Lettuce, No BS! Brass Band, People's Blues Of Richmond, Phil Lesh & Friends (2 days), Preservation Hall Jazz Band, the Revivalists, SOJA, Steve Winwood, the String Cheese Incident (2 days), Taj Mahal, Tauk, Tedeschi Trucks Band, Tom Petty and the Heartbreakers, Umphrey's McGee, Widespread Panic (2 days), Wilco (2 days), Willie Nelson, the Wood Brothers.

- Bob Weir & RatDog and Furthur were scheduled to perform but cancelled their appearances.

=== 2015 ===
Anders Osborne, Billy & The Kids feat. Bob Weir, the Doobie Brothers, Fishbone, Gov't Mule (2 days), Hot Tuna, the Jayhawks, Jimmy Cliff, Jorma Kaukonen & Jack Casady Celebrate 50 Years of the Jefferson Airplane, Karl Denson's Tiny Universe feat. Chuck Leavell, Keller Williams' Grateful Gospel, Lord Nelson, Love Cannon, Mad Dogs & Englishmen: A Tribute to Joe Cocker feat. Tedeschi Trucks Band with Special Guests Leon Russell, Dave Mason, The Southern Belles, Rita Coolidge, Chris Robinson, Doyle Bramhall II & Friends, Melvin Seals & JGB feat. John Kadlecik, Lord Nelson, Mickey Hart (2 days), Moogatu, Moonalice, North Mississippi Allstars, Phil Lesh & Friends with Carlos Santana (2 days), Robert Plant & The Sensational Space Shifters (2 days), Seth Stainback & Roosterfoot, Slightly Stoopid, Steve Earle & The Dukes, St. Paul And The Broken Bones, the String Cheese Incident with the Doobie Brothers, Tedeschi Trucks Band, Trombone Shorty & Orleans Avenue, Umphrey's McGee, Widespread Panic (2 days)

- Due to a violent storm at Oak Ridge Farm on September 9, the day before the festival was scheduled to open, camping and performances were cancelled for the next day and the schedule was modified for the next three days. Bands originally scheduled to perform who did not were Galactic, Little Feat and Soulive.

=== 2016 ===
Phish, Charles Bradley & His Extraordinaires, Chris Robinson Brotherhood, Circles Around the Sun, Doobie Decibel System, Donna the Buffalo, EOTO, Galactic with special guest Lee Oskar, Garcia's Forest, Gary Clark Jr., Hard Working Americans, DJ Williams Projekt, Moogatu, Dharma Initiative, Joe Russo's Almost Dead (2 Late nights), Keller Williams' Grateful Gospel, Keller Williams' Grateful Grass, Khruangbin, Lettuce, Moon Taxi, My Morning Jacket, Peter Wolf, Phil Lesh & Friends (2 days), Phish (2 days), Tedeschi Trucks Band, Turkuaz, Twiddle, Umphrey's McGee, Vulfpeck, the Wailers, Ween (2 days), White Denim

- Brandi Carlile was scheduled to perform but cancelled her appearance due to health issues.

=== 2017 ===
Phil Lesh & Friends, Infamous Stringdusters, Widespread Panic, John Fogerty, the String Cheese Incident, Gov't Mule, Umphrey's McGee, John Butler Trio, Joe Russo's Almost Dead, moe., the Disco Biscuits, the Revivalists, Greensky Bluegrass, Keller Williams, Margo Price, Marcus King Band, Eric Krasno Band, Brandi Carlile, JJ Grey & Mofro, Pigeons Playing Ping Pong, the Suffers, Los Colognes, the Avett Brothers, TAUK, Kendall Street Company, Anthony Rosano & the Conqueroos, Mighty Joshua, Sun-Dried Opossum, and Jim James.

=== 2018 ===
Umphrey’s McGee, Jason Bonham, Lettuce (2 days), Butcher Brown, Erin & The Wildfire, Firecracker Jam, Jerry Dance Party, Joe Russo’s Almost Dead, Widespread Panic, George Clinton & P-Funk, Toots and the Maytals, Moon Taxi, Turkuaz, Bob Harford’s Band of Changes, Ghost Light, Caitlyn Smith, the FUZZ Band, Dead & Company (2 days) [with Branford Marsalis, second day], Tedeschi Trucks Band, Foundation of Funk, Pigeons Playing Ping Pong, Keller & The Keels, Big Something, Agents of Good Roots, the Suffers, Southern Avenue, People’s Blues of Richmond, Disco Risque, Sheryl Crow, Blues Traveler, Matisyahu, Spafford, The Judy Chops, Keller Williams’ Grateful Gospel.

=== 2019 ===
Andy Frasco & The U.N., Khruangbin featuring Trey Anastasio, Gary Clark Jr., Joe Russo's Almost Dead (Bob Weir came out on stage, sat on a couch and read a newspaper), Circles Around The Sun (days before guitarist Neal Casal ended his life), Greg Humphreys, Moonalice with Lester Chambers of the Chambers Brothers, Melvin Seals and Jerry Garcia Band with John Kadlecik, Edie Brickell & New Bohemians, Pigeons Playing Ping Pong with Cory Wong, Old Crow Medicine Show, the Revivalists, Trey Anastasio Band with Derek Trucks, Galactic, Liz Cooper & The Stampede, Cory Henry and The Funk Apostles, Preservation Hall Jazz Band, Twiddle with John Popper, Oteil + Friends featuring Bob Weir, Vulfpeck, Tedeschi Trucks Band with Trey Anastasio, Keller Williams' Grateful Gospel, Soulive, Cory Henry, Deva Mahal, the Soul Rebels, Nahko and Medicine for the People, Steel Pulse with Bob Weir, St. Paul and The Broken Bones, moe., Jason Isbell and the 400 Unit, Marcus King, Bob Weir and Wolf Bros with Don Was, Jay Lane and Susan Tedeschi.

=== 2020 ===
Celebrating Phil Lesh's 80th birthday, the festival was initially set for mid-June but was deferred due to the 2020 COVID-19 pandemic and ensuing quarantine. A suggested date of October 2–4 had been proposed, but the festival ended up being cancelled. Confirmed artists on the initially released lineup included the Phil Lesh Quintet featuring Warren Haynes, Jimmy Herring, John Molo and Rob Barraco (four sets total, two with David Crosby), Brandi Carlile, Bruce Hornsby and the Noise Makers, Gov't Mule, Goose, the Chain Gang (featuring Devon Allman, Duane Betts, Cody + Luther Dickinson, Samantha Fish, John Ginty and Berry Oakley Jr.) playing Rumours, Yola (singer), Grateful Shred, Oteil + Friends (featuring Eric Krasno, Jeff Sipe, Jason Crosby, John Kimoch, Jen Hartswick, James Casey, Alfreda Gerald, Junior Mack and Tom Guarna), David Crosby, Mike Gordon, Black Pumas, Garcia Peoples, Kendall Street Company, Keller Williams' Grateful Gospel, Midnight North, the War and Treaty, Meute, Railroad Earth featuring Peter Rowan playing Old & In the Way, Electric Hot Tuna, Leon Bridges, and Joe Russo's Almost Dead featuring Phil Lesh and John Mayer. There was to be an additional "Steal Your Thursday," with performances by the Marcus King Band, Dark Star Orchestra, Brandon "Taz" Neiderauer, Rose Hill, and others. Garcia's Forest was to have performances by Circles Around the Sun, BoomBox with Backbeat Brass, Ghost-Note, Ace of Cups and David Gans and Fragile Thunder, and the VIP lounge was to have performances by Phil Lesh, Jorma Kaukonen, and Keller Williams.

=== 2021 ===
The 2021 festival was moved from October to three separate shows on the weekends of August 13–15, August 20–22, and August 27–29.

== See also ==
- List of jam band music festivals
