= Spafford (band) =

American jam band

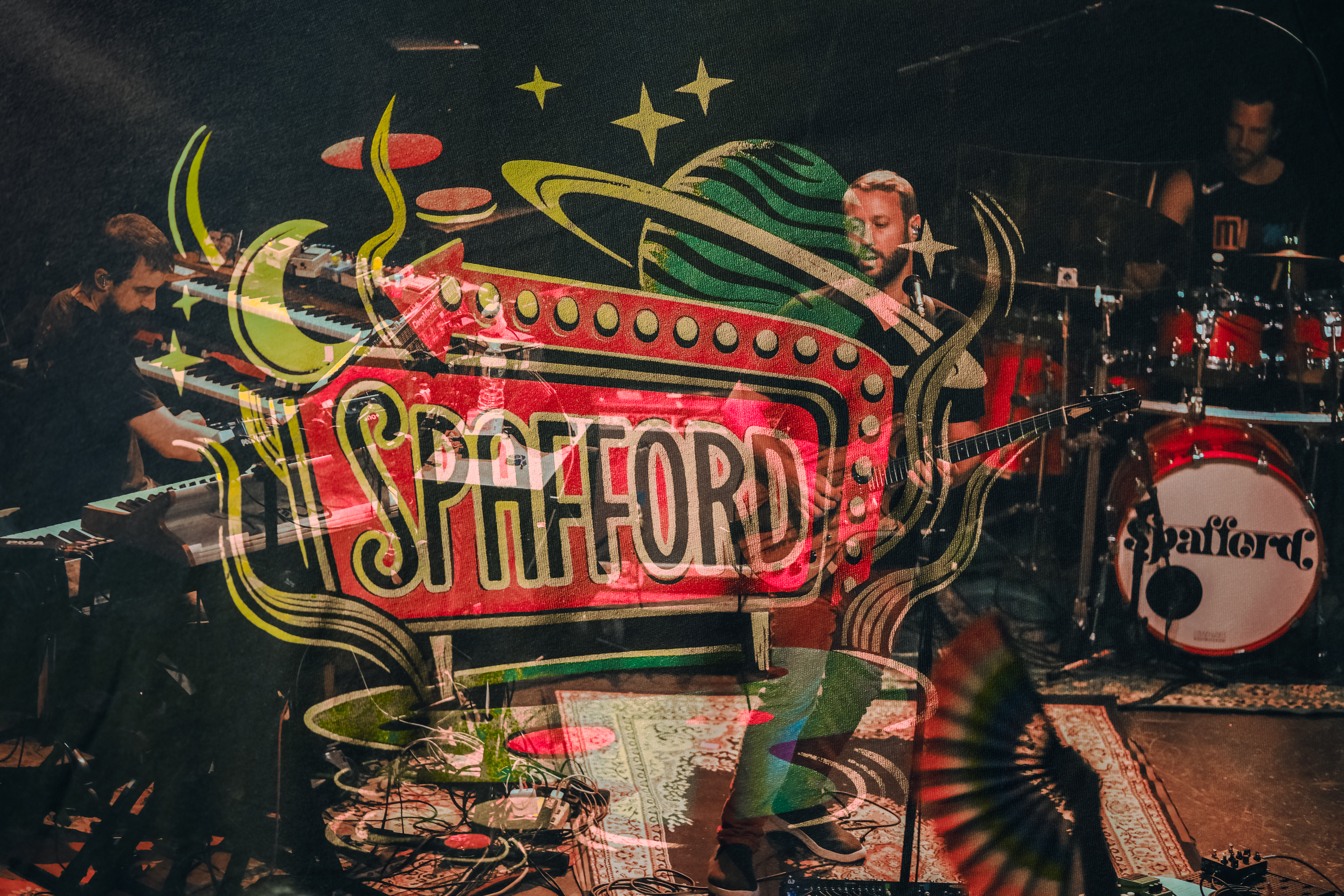
- Spafford

Background information
- Origin: Prescott, Arizona, USA
- Genres: jam rock
- Years active: 2009–present
- Label: self-released
- Members: Brian Moss (guitar/vocals); Cory Schechtman (keys/vocals); Nick Tkachyk (drums/vocals); Shon Gordon (bass/vocals)
- Past members: Andrew "Red" Johnson (keys/vocals); Cameron LaForest (drums/vocals); Jordan Fairless (bass/vocals)
- Website: http://www.spafford.net/

Spafford is a U.S.-based jam band that blends multiple genres of music including rock, funk, jazz, reggae, ska, and electro-pop. The group self-releases its recordings, including studio albums, improvisational sessions, and soundboard releases of their live shows.

== History ==
Brian Moss and Jordan Fairless are the founding members of Spafford. In 2008 they played open mic nights at Coyote Joe's, a venue in Prescott, Arizona. At the time, Moss played guitar and Fairless played percussion. In 2010, Mike Kreidel (2010-2011) became Spafford's drummer, and Fairless, a multi-instrumentalist, assumed the bass guitar. The first keyboard player was Jonathan Hust (2010-2011). In 2011, Andrew "Red" Johnson (keys/vocals) and Nick Tkachyk joined Spafford. Tkachyk took a break in 2017, and Cameron Laforest became Spafford's drummer, in place of Tkachyk until his return in early 2019. Johnson announced his departure from the band in fall 2022 after vetting Schechtman as his replacement. Through their tours, archives, and live video recordings, Spafford has established a fan base of "Spaffnerds" who travel to see the band and maintain an online community.

== Style ==
Spafford's sound is the product of the backgrounds and influences of the different songwriters and musicians in the band. The band uses an improvisational style to transition within and between the songs in their sets of live music, which sometimes include diverse covers performed in unique and improvisational styles. Spafford tours across the U.S., and each of their shows features a different setlist and approach to the songs in their catalogue of original music. The band often provides live streams and access to recordings of its shows.

== Members ==
Brian Moss was born on February 22, 1985, in River Vale, New Jersey. He started writing music when he was 12 years old. Brian moved to Arizona in his twenties and played in several bands in Phoenix and in Prescott before he met Jordan Fairless in 2008 and went on to develop Spafford shortly thereafter.

Jordan Christopher Fairless was born on September 1, 1985. Raised in a musical family in Nashville, Tennessee, Jordan is a multi-instrumentalist. He was more a drummer than a bassist when he and Brian first met, and he focused on the bass guitar thereafter. Jordan served as a sound engineer at Prescott's Green Room during Spafford's early years.

Nick Tkachyk was born February 24, 1989, in Tucson, Arizona. His first musical endeavor was a ska outfit in high school. In addition to playing drums, Nick also creates electronic music. Nick took a hiatus from Spafford from 2017 - 2019, being replaced by Cameron LaForest, before rejoining the group for Jazz Festival in New Orleans, LA.

Chuck "Spafford" Johnson was born on June 23, 1985. He is originally from Denver, Colorado. Chuck was Spafford's original lighting designer, co-lyricist, and namesake.

Andrew "Red" Johnson was born on December 2, 1980. He hails from Belvidere, Illinois, and moved to Phoenix in 2001. Red was a pianist, vocalist, and keyboard player in the Phoenix music scene before he joined Spafford for his first show at the Hard Rock in Las Vegas in 2011.

On November 21, 2022, Andrew "Red" Johnson announced his intention to leave Spafford, citing the desire to spend more time with family. His last show with Spafford was December 31 of that year. Cory Schechtman was named a permanent replacement.

On March 31, 2025, the band announced on social media that Jordan was no longer a member of the band.

== Performances ==
Spafford has hosted after-party shows for Furthur and Widespread Panic. Spafford has also been the featured act at the Las Vegas venues Hard Rock Hotel and Casino and The Palms. Spafford has opened for Umphrey's McGee and shared the stage with, Particle, the Motet, and EOTO.

== Tours ==
In summer 2014, Spafford toured the Southwest. In 2016, Spafford traveled East of Colorado for their "Breakout Tour". On that tour, they sold out Chicago's Tonic Room for a two-night show in less than two hours.

In winter 2017, Spafford toured with Umphrey's McGee for over a dozen shows. They also headlined their own tour simultaneously. Spafford joined Umphrey's McGee again to play five shows for the second leg of their summer 2018 tour.

In winter 2018, Spafford kicked off the For Amusement Only tour with 17 shows across the Northeast, Midwest, and Southeast United States. Spafford also toured from September to November 2017 and returned to their home base in Phoenix, Arizona to play a three-night, sold-out New Year's Eve run at the Crescent Ballroom. The fall tour included more than 30 dates in over 20 states across the U.S.

On the 2018 schedule for Spafford was a continuation of the For Amusement Only tour to promote their third studio album, which follows Abaculus: An Improvisational Experience (2017) and Spafford (2012). They released the first single, "Leave the Light On," from For Amusement Only on April 4, 2018. The band has also released live albums from songs played on tour, including A Taste of Fall in 2017. In 2019, Spafford played a 40-show winter tour, spanning across two months from January until March. The tour set the band to cover ground starting in Minnesota, to New York, Florida, and Colorado, out to Washington, and ending in California. The locations are many venues they had played in the prior year; however, across the states the band announced many debuts in venues much larger than those than in 2018. In Asheville, they played the 1,050 capacity Orange Peel after playing the smaller Asheville Music Hall the prior year. Similarly, graduating from the 625-person Terminal West to the 1,000-person Variety Playhouse in Atlanta, Georgia. Spafford confirmed and began a winter tour in 2020, which was cut short in March by the COVID-19 pandemic. In May 2020, the band played and live-streamed a socially-distant drive in show in Mesa, Arizona, one of the first of its kind in the U.S. at the beginning of the pandemic. In December 2020, Spafford played two live New Year's Eve shows and broadcast them to fans across the country. The band returned to the Marquee Theater in Tempe, Arizona, in spring 2021 for two outdoor shows for live audiences.

Spafford's fall 2021 tour included 22 dates in venues across the U.S. In 2022, they played 47 live shows across the U.S., including Red Johnson's final shows with the band on December 30 and 31 at the Marquee Theatre in Tempe, AZ. Spafford's first year on tour with Schechtman on the keys, 2023, featured 80 live shows in Spring and Summer, with nearly 30 additional shows booked for the remainder of the calendar year.

== Festivals ==
Earlier festivals Spafford appeared at include Gem and Jam (Tucson, AZ), Euphoria (Austin, TX), and the McDowell Mountain Music Festival (Phoenix, AZ).

In mid-2017, Spafford played Head for the Hills (New Braunfels, TX), Mad Tea Party Jam (Artemas, PA), Electric Forest (Rothbury, MI), Some Kind of Jam (Schuylkill Haven, PA), Summer Camp (Chillicothe, IL), Wind Rider (Alto, NM), and the Resonance Music Festival (Thornville, OH). At these festivals, Spafford played alongside artists like Rusted Root, Gov’t Mule, My Morning Jacket, The String Cheese Incident, Moe., Bassnectar, Trey Anastasio Band, Lettuce, Mike Gordon, Primus, the Disco Biscuits, and Lotus.

At the Sweetwater 420 Fest at Centennial Olympic Park in Atlanta, Georgia, Spafford performed alongside a lineup that included the String Cheese Incident, Tedeschi Trucks Band, Joe Russo's Almost Dead, and Greensky Bluegrass. Spafford also returned to the Summer Camp Music Festival in Chillicothe, Illinois alongside moe., Phil Lesh & the Terrapin Family Band, and Cypress Hill. Spafford's first Bonnaroo appearance is billed with artists including Eminem, Muse and the Killers. Additionally, the band made its debut appearance at Firefly with Kendrick Lamar and Arctic Monkeys, The Peach Music Festival (featuring Phil Lesh, Gov't Mule and Joe Russo's Almost Dead), and Lockn' (featuring Umphrey's McGee, Widespread Panic, and Dead & Co.).

In May 2020, Spafford performed for Quarantine Comes Alive, a virtual music festival benefitting the COVID-19 Relief Fund that raised over $170,000 in proceeds.

Spafford returned to the Peach Music Festival in 2021 with artists including Oysterhead and Warren Haynes. They will also headlined the Moon Dance Music Festival in Gleason, WI and played the Bottlerock festival in Napa Valley alongside Guns N' Roses, Stevie Nicks, and the Foo Fighters.

Spafford has engaged several notable live collaborations during live sets with artists including Karl Denson; Aron Magner; Brendan Bayliss; and Jennifer Hartswick, Natalie Cressman, and James Casey of Trey Anastasio Band.

== Recordings ==
Spafford's recording history includes a mix of studio (e.g. Spafford [2012]; For Amusement Only [2018]; The Gaff Tapes [2019]); Simple Mysteries [2022]); live (e.g. Live Vol. 1-3 [2015, 2016, 2020]; A Taste of Fall [2017]; Live at the Drive-In [2020]; Live Wax Vol. 1 [2023]; and improvisational works (e.g. Abaculus [2017]; Chapel Jam [2019]; The Big Field Sessions [2021]). The band makes video and audio recordings of many of their live shows available shortly after each event for their large and growing fanbase.

The first Spafford studio album was self-titled, released in 2012, and the band termed it "traditional."

In 2017, Spafford released the hour-long, single track Abaculus: An Improvisational Experience, culled from a continuous jam the band recorded at their rehearsal space called "The Pound."

Among the live recordings that Spafford has made available, the band has released several studio albums, including For Amusement Only, which was released in spring 2018, The Gaff Tapes, which was released in fall 2019, and Simple Mysteries, which was released in Fall 2022.

== Discography ==
=== Studio albums ===
- Spafford (2012)
- Abaculus: An Improvisational Experience (2017)
- For Amusement Only (2018)
- The Gaff Tapes (2019)
- Chapel Jam (2019)
- Simple Mysteries (2022)
- Cat Shop (2026)

=== Live albums ===
- Live at Firefly 2013 (2015)
- Live, Vol. 1 (2015)
- Live in Las Vegas (3/27/2015) (2015)
- Live, Vol. 2 (2016)
- A Taste of Fall 2017 (Live) (2017)
- Live at the Drive-In (2020)
- Live, Vol. 3 (2020)
- Live in Nashville (2023)
- Live Wax, Vol. 1 (2023)
- Live Wax, Vol. 2 (2024)
- Live in Montana (2024)
- Live in Reno (2024)
