= Tom Hamilton Jr. =

American musician

Tom Hamilton
- Genres: Indie, electronic, alt-country, jam band
- Occupations: Musician, songwriter, producer, vocalist, guitarist
- Instruments: Guitar, vocals, drums, piano, bass
- Years active: 2000–present
- Label: Royal Potato Family
- Website: Official Tom Hamilton Jr. Website

Tom Hamilton Jr. is an American songwriter, musician, producer, and the lead vocalist and guitarist for the bands Brothers Past, American Babies, Ghost Light, Joe Russo's Almost Dead, Bill Kreutzmann's Billy & the Kids, and Electron.

== Brothers Past ==
Hamilton formed Brothers Past in 1996, straight out of high school, with classmates Joe D'Amico (bass), Nick Desiderio (drums), and his older brother Jim Hamilton (guitar). In 1998, Hamilton met Tom McKee and asked him to join the band as a keyboardist and vocalist. This initial line-up toured the Mid-Atlantic area heavily until 1999, when D'Amico, Desiderio, and the elder Hamilton brother left the band to pursue more normal lifestyles. In the end, Hamilton and McKee settled on hiring Clay Parnell and Rick Lowenberg as the new rhythm section in 2000 and began touring again in 2001.

Hamilton has been the primary songwriter, guitarist, and vocalist for Brothers Past, as well as co-producer for all of their recorded releases.

== American Babies ==
In 2006 Hamilton started playing sporadic acoustic concerts around the Philadelphia area billed as "Tom Hamilton's American Babies", mainly as a way to stay occupied between Brothers Past tours. As the internal relationships in Brothers Past disintegrated and his musical tastes changed Hamilton focused more on acoustic oriented music and decided to make a new band geared towards his new muse. American Babies was formed in 2007 and soon after they released a self-titled album. This was followed by their sophomore release Flawed Logic in 2011 and third album Knives and Teeth on October 15, 2013. In 2016, American Babies released their fourth album, An Epic Battle Between Light & Dark. Tom described the record as a discussion of both what it is like to experience depression and what it takes to maintain hope while in the midst of it.

== Electron ==
Since 2000, Tom Hamilton has been playing with Electron along with current members, Marc Brownstein, Mike Greenfield, and Aron Magner.

== Joe Russo's Almost Dead ==
In 2013, Tom Hamilton also began playing with Joe Russo, Dave Dreiwitz, Marco Benevento and Scott Metzger in a Grateful Dead tribute band called Joe Russo's Almost Dead.

== Ghost Light ==
In 2018, Tom Hamilton along with Holly Bowling, Raina Mullen, Steve Lyons, & Scotty Zwang formed the band Ghost Light.

== Grateful Dead Alumni and Related Performances ==
Hamilton first played with Grateful Dead bassist, Phil Lesh on March 14–15, 2014, at Lesh's Terrapin Crossroads in San Rafael, California, as a member of Phil and Friends. This was followed by another concert at Terrapin Crossroads on October 6, 2014 which was billed as "East Coast All-Stars", and a three night run on December 29–31 to close out 2014 at the Capitol Theatre in Port Chester, New York billed as "PhilRAD".

In October 2014, Hamilton was announced as part of Grateful Dead's Bill Kreutzmann's new band Billy & the Kids. Also in the band are Reed Mathis and Aron Magner.

On August 15, 2015 Bob Weir joined Hamilton and his Billy & the Kids bandmates at The Peach Music Festival in Scranton, Pennsylvania

On September 12, 2015, Hamilton played with the Grateful Dead's Bob Weir, Bill Kreutzmann, and Mickey Hart at the third annual Lockn' Festival in Arrington, Virginia during Billy & the Kids' headlining set.

On June 29, 2022 Hamilton played with Melvin Seals, Dave Schools, Duane Trucks, Jacklyn LaBranch, Lady Chi, and the Colorado Symphony Orchestra at the Jerry Garcia’s 80th Birthday Symphonic Celebration held at Red Rocks Amphitheatre near Morrison, Colorado.

== Producer ==
In 2002 Hamilton produced a self-released recording for then unknown Philadelphia artist Kurt Vile in the basement of his West Chester, PA home.

In 2008 Hamilton was hired by the Disco Biscuits to produce and record what would turn out to be their 2010 release Planet Anthem.

In 2009 Hamilton recorded and produced Philadelphia-based folk group, Mason Porter's 2010 album Thunder in the Valley.
