= Niederauer =

Niederauer is a surname. Notable people with the surname include:

- Brandon Niederauer (born 2003), American guitarist and actor
- Duncan L. Niederauer, American businessman
- George Hugh Niederauer (1936–2017), American Roman Catholic bishop
