= Live at Bell's =

Live At Bell's is the third release from the winners of the 2006 Telluride Bluegrass Festival Band Competition, Greensky Bluegrass. Recorded in the summer of 2007 at their home base of Bell's Brewery, this album is the first live offering by the boys from Kalamazoo, Michigan. The album contains a cover of the Talking Heads hit Road To Nowhere, and their original tune "Radio Blues" is currently playing on XM Radio's 'X-Country'.

== Track listing ==
1. Bont's Breakdown (Bont)
2. Middle Mountain Towns (Hoffman)
3. Bottle Dry (Bruzza, Hoffman)
4. Send Me Your Address From Heaven (Traditional)
5. Can't Make Time (Hoffman)
6. Road To Nowhere (Byrne)
7. My Sally (Brace)
8. Runnin' The Briars (Bont)
9. Cassidy (Barlow, Weir)
10. Old Barns (Hoffman)
11. Tuesday Letter (Hoffman)
12. Airmail Special (Christian, Goodman, Mundy)
13. New Rize Hill (Bont, Bruzza, Hoffman)

== Personnel ==
- Michael Arlen Bont - Banjo, vocals
- David Bruzza - Guitars, vocals
- Mike Devol - Bass, vocals
- Paul Hoffman - Mandolin, vocals
