= Daniel Donato =

American guitarist and singer-songwriter

- Born: April 6, 1995 (age 31)
- Genres: Progressive country; country rock; jam band
- Occupation: Musician
- Instruments: Guitar, vocals
- Website: danieldonato.com

Daniel Donato (born April 6, 1995) is an American guitarist, singer, and songwriter. He is the founder of Cosmic Country, a band known for its improvisational blend of country rock and psychedelia. Rolling Stone has called him "Nashville's Newest Guitar Hero".

== Early career and influences ==
Donato was born in Atlantic City, New Jersey, and lived there until 2002, when his family moved to a location outside Nashville, Tennessee. He began playing guitar at the age of 12, inspired by his experience playing the video game Guitar Hero and wide-ranging musical influences. When he was 14 years old, he began busking on the streets of Nashville, earning money to buy guitars and amps and learning more about music. Sometimes he would take the money he made busking to pay local bands to allow him sit in for a few songs. A few years later, at 17, he secured a permanent gig at the legendary honky-tonk Robert's Western World and joined local mainstay, the Don Kelly Band, He played 464 shows with the Don Kelly Band 4 nights a week, sometimes over 4 hours straight.

In 2015, after seeing Sturgill Simpson play at the Ryman Auditorium, he has stated that he became motivated to find his own sound and voice and blaze his own path in the music world. The sound he was working to manifest blended his influence and experience of the country world, with his love of the music of the Grateful Dead and their improvisational approach to playing live music. Daniel would call his vision "Cosmic Country", referring to a mix of roadhouse twang, crunchy rock and roll, improvisational fireworks, and psychedelia. While his dream of "cosmic country" was still forming, Donato played guitar in the country-rock band The Wild Feathers, appearing on their 2016 album, Live at the Ryman.

== Songwriting and albums ==
Donato remained focused on developing his songwriting and in 2019 he released his first solo album, Starlight EP. Starlight was an early incarnation of the "cosmic country" sound, and included the song "Luck of the Draw", a highlight of his live show. Donato continued to refine his vision of Cosmic Country, releasing A Young Man's Country (2020), Cosmic Country & Western Songs (2021). But it wasn't until 2023's Reflector that his vision was fully realized. Reflector has spent 29 weeks on the Americana album carts. While Daniel and his band have welcomed the success of the album, it has been said that it is at their live shows that the true sonic frequencies of Cosmic Country are fully experienced. Donato has said they are focused on selling a million tickets, not a million records.

Donato is said to be influenced by a wide range of styles and guitar players, including country musicians such as Merle Haggard, Willie Nelson, Waylon Jennings, Bob Wills, Marty Robbins, Bill Monroe, Hank Williams, as well as jam band pioneers, Grateful Dead, and their lead guitarist, Jerry Garcia, Phish and hard rock bands like Guns N' Roses and blues rock guitarist Stevie Ray Vaughan. He has performed live with Billy & the Kids, led by Bill Kreutzmann, founding member of Grateful Dead, Phil Lesh's Phil and Friends, and other bands/musicians such as Widespread Panic, Billy Strings, Bob Weir, and Umphrey's Mcgee.

He has published a guitar instructional book, The New Master Of The Telecaster: Pathways To Dynamic Solos, with publisher Hal Leonard. He also has an instructional course through Pickup Music.

== Cosmic Country band ==
Donato had been developing the sound he calls "cosmic country" and playing with a rotating cast of musicians for at least 5 years before the current lineup of an enduring band started to come into form. The lineup in 2021 included Nathan "Sugarleg" Aronowitz (keyboards, guitar, vocals), Will "Mustang" McGee (bass, vocals), and Noah (drums). They played one of their first shows on the street in front of a Widespread Panic concert at the Riverside Theater (Milwaukee). The band tours across the country, playing over 150 shows a year and they rapidly built their fanbase. This original Cosmic Country lineup played on the Reflector album (2023), the first of all original songs developed and refined and tested on the road. Noah Miller left the band in 2023 and was replaced on drums by Will "Bronco" Clark. As of 2024, the members of Cosmic Country are Daniel Donato (guitar/vocals), Will "Mustang" McGee (bass, vocals), Nathan "Sugarleg" Aronowitz (keyboards, guitar, vocals), and Will "Bronco" Clark (drums, vocals)

The band is known for playing shows that typically last 3 hours or more. The shows often include covers of country and Outlaw country, Rhythm and blues/Soul music, and Rock music classics, Donato's honky-tonk inspired originals, and original songs by McGee and Aronowitz.

The band has played at iconic venues including Red Rocks Amphitheatre and the Ryman Auditorium, and have appeared on the Grand Ole Opry and CBS Saturday Morning

Donato and his band went back into the studio in January 2025 to record their follow up to Reflector

== Discography ==
- Starlight [EP] (2019)
- A Young Man's Country (2020)
- Cosmic Country & Western Songs (2021)
- Reflector (2023)
- Horizons (2025)
