= Dinner Time (album) =

Studio album by Louieville Sluggah
- Released: 2007
- Genre: Underground hip hop, East Coast hip hop
- Language: English
- Label: Self-released

Louieville Sluggah chronology
Dinner Time (2007)	Best Kept Secret (2010)

Dinner Time is the debut album by Boot Camp Clik member Louieville Sluggah. It was released in 2007.

== Track listing ==
1. Henny
2. Fired Up
3. Eat By T-Spass a.k.a. Tye
4. Look Into My Eyes
5. It Was Hard
6. Be Eazee
7. O.T.P.
8. Doggie Holla
9. Diesel
10. O.T.P.G.
11. Doggies And Doggettes
12. Holla
