= Alquin =

Dutch rock band

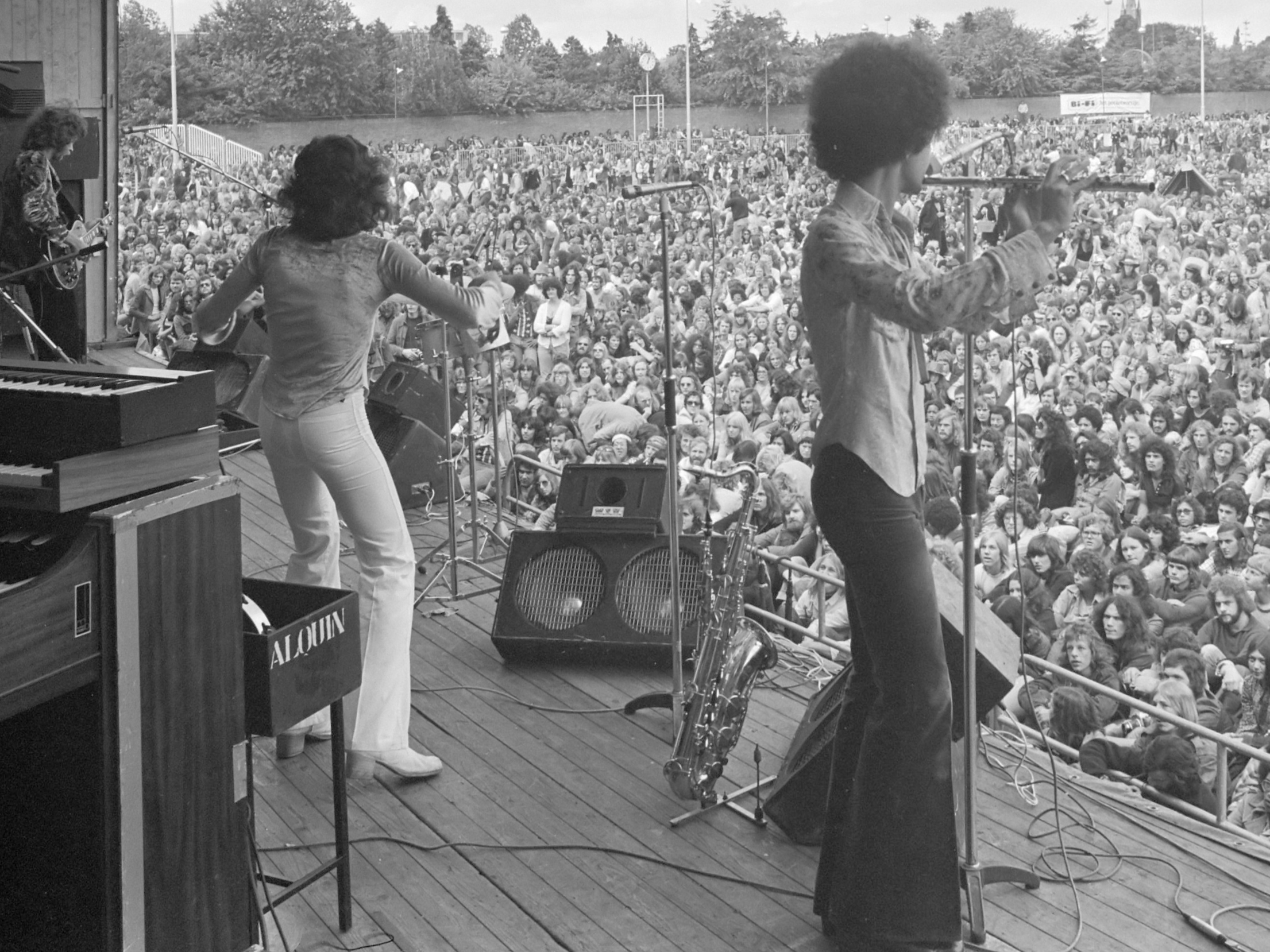
- Alquin (1974)

Background information
- Origin: Netherlands
- Genres: Progressive rock
- Years active: 1971–1977; 2003–2012
- Labels: Polydor, RCA Victor
- Members: Dick Franssen; Ferdinand Bakker; Job Tarenskeen; Michel van Dijk; Ronald Ottenhoff; Walter Latuperissa
- Past members: Jan Visser; Bart Terlaak; Piet-Hein Strack van Schijndel; Paul Westrate; Hein Mars; Rob ten Bokum; Frans Koenn; Dick Schulte-Nordholt
- Website: www.alquin.org

Alquin was a Dutch progressive rock band which released four studio albums in the 1970s. The band split in 1977. They made a comeback in 2003 and in September 2005 they released a new album.

== Discography ==
=== Studio albums ===
- 1972 - Marks - 12"LP - POLYDOR - 2925 012
- 1973 - Mountain Queen - 12"LP - POLYDOR - 2925 019
- 1975 - Nobody Can Wait Forever (NL Version) - 12"LP - POLYDOR - 2925 030
- 1975 - Nobody Can Wait Forever (UK Version) - 12"LP - POLYDOR - 2480 262
- 1975 - Nobody Can Wait Forever (US Version) - 12"LP - RCA VICTOR - APL1 1061
- 1976 - Best Kept Secret - 12"LP - POLYDOR - 2925 045
- 2005 - Blue Planet - CD - HUNTER MUSIC - 771 617 2
- 2009 - Sailors And Sinners - CD - UNIVERSAL - 602527164229

=== Live albums ===
- 1976 - Alquin On Tour - 12"LP - POLYDOR - 2441 069
- 2003 - One More Night - 2 CD's + DVD - ALPHA CENTAURI - ACE 11047

=== Compilation albums ===
- 1977 - Crash - Terugblik op loopbaan - 2 12"LP's - POLYDOR - 2646 101
- 1990 - Marks + Mountain Queen - CD - POLYDOR - 843 211 2
- 1990 - Nobody Can Wait Forever + Best Kept Secret - CD - POLYDOR - 843 212 2
- 1999 - 3 Originals (Nobody Can Wait Forever + Best Kept Secret + Alquin On Tour) - 2 CD's - UNIVERSAL - 559 914 2
- 1999 - Wheelchair Groupie - CD - ROTATION - 559 091 2
- 2002 - The Universal Masters Collection - CD - POLYDOR - 586 848 2
- 2005 - The Ultimate Collection - 3 CD's - HUNTER MUSIC - 771 604 2
- 2008 - 50 Jaar Nederpop - Classic Bands - CD - UNIVERSAL - 178 610 8
- 2013 - The Marks Sessions - 2 CD's - Pseudonym - CDP-1109
- - Chapter 1 - The Marks Sessions, Chapter 2 - Live At Circustheater
