= Brothers Past =

American indie-electronic band

Brother's Past
- Origin: Philadelphia, Pennsylvania, USA
- Genres: Jam band, indie rock, electronica, progressive rock, livetronica
- Years active: 2000–2007, 2009–2014 (Hiatus)
- Label: SCI Fidelity
- Members: Tom Hamilton Jr. Tom McKee; Clay Parnell; Rick Lowenberg (2000-2006, 2009-2014)
- Past members: Ilya Stemkovsky (2006—2009)
- Website: Official Brothers Past Bandcamp

Brothers Past are an indie-electronic band from Philadelphia that has been called "one of the most talked about independent acts in the nation." Since forming in 1998, the band has released five albums and one EP, including the critically acclaimed This Feeling's Called Goodbye (SCI Fidelity Records) in 2005. The band has performed across the United States and Canada including appearances at Bonnaroo, SxSW, Wakarusa and Langerado. Brothers Past has been featured in Relix and their self-released albums have been reviewed in Urb Magazine, The Philadelphia Inquirer, Philadelphia Daily News and The Village Voice.

== History ==
The band was formed in 1998 by Tom Hamilton (vocals, guitar), Tom McKee (keyboards, vocals), Clay Parnell (a.k.a. "Parnstar,"bass, vocals), and Rick Lowenberg (drums). Hamilton and McKee have worked together since May 1998. After moving into a house together outside of West Chester, PA, the four musicians began writing material influenced by various elements of electronica (drum and bass, jungle, dub and house music.) The band began a Thursday night residency at Rex's in West Chester, PA, where it performed weekly for almost two years, with Sean Ford on the sound, building a small but dedicated following of fans. Not long after, the band began touring the East Coast and performing at regional festivals.

Since then, Brothers Past toured nationally across the United States, playing more than 800 shows since their 2000 formation, including appearances at Wakarusa, Bonnaroo and SXSW. In the middle of 2006, it was announced that Lowenberg would be leaving the band to pursue environmental law and that Ilya Stemkovsky, formerly of OM Trio would take over for him. Stemkovsky performed with the band until Dec. 31, 2007, when the band announced a hiatus to focus on other interests. Hamilton and Parnell both turned their focus to side projects—Hamilton embraced his love of songwriting with the Americana-tinged stylings of American Babies and Parnell began working with drummer Johnny Rabb as part of the drum and bass duo Biodiesel. McKee began teaching piano at the School of Rock in Downingtown, PA where he currently works as the school's Music Director.

After a one-year hiatus, the band returned to the stage (with original drummer Rick Lowenberg) at a New Year's Eve performance on December 31, 2008 at The Note in West Chester, Pennsylvania. The show sold out in less than 30 minutes.

In October 2010, Brothers Past celebrated its 10-year anniversary and marked the occasion with the announcement of a digital box set release entitled, Everything Must Go. On the 10th of every month, a new studio track and a previously unreleased soundboard recording of a special show from the band's ten-year history is released via the band's website.

In 2012 Brothers Past self-released their 3rd studio album entitled, Everything Must Go 0111.

Brothers Past has since taken another hiatus after playing their last show on 08/23/2014 at Camp Barefoot. There was no mention of the hiatus or official address from the band, but their website has since gone out of service. All members are currently working on their own projects.

== Discography ==
- 1998 Catharsis self-released
- 2001 Elements self-released
- 2003 A Wonderful Day self-released
- 2004 statEPolice self-released EP
- 2005 This Feeling's Called Goodbye SCI Fidelity
- 2012 "Everything Must Go 0111" self-released
