= Best Kept Secret (Louieville Sluggah album) =

Studio album by Louieville Sluggah
- Released: 2010
- Genre: Underground hip hop, East Coast hip hop
- Label: Chambermusik Records
- Producer: Smoke the World

Louieville Sluggah chronology
Dinner Time (2007)	Best Kept Secret (2010)

Best Kept Secret is the second solo album by Boot Camp Clik member, Louieville Sluggah. It was released by Chambermusik Records in 2010.

== Track listing ==
1. Intro
2. On Top of the World
3. Roll wit a Boss (featuring Ba'E Boii Zeek)
4. Brooklyn (featuring Coco, F.O.U.L., and Steele)
5. Can't Get Out (featuring F.O.U.L. and Spazz)
6. Changing (featuring Naja)
7. Everything I Touch (featuring F.O.U.L.)
8. Girl (featuring Isha Hollins)
9. Guide You
10. Sonado by Tea Time featuring Louieville Sluggah
11. Tell You Somethings (featuring F.O.U.L.)
12. Addicted by Willy Dutch featuring Louieville Sluggah
