= Turkuaz (band) =

American funk band

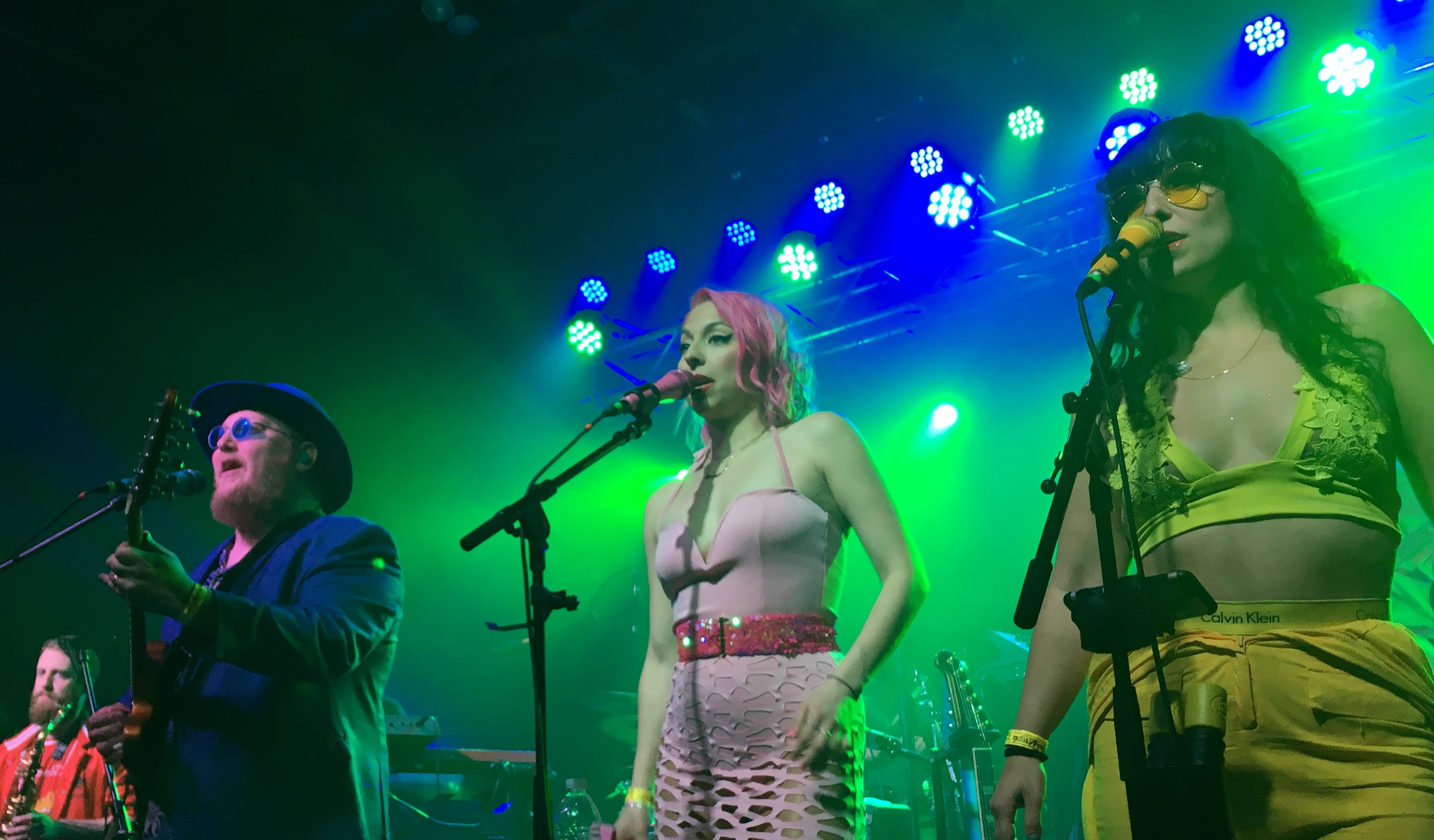
- Turkuaz performing in 2017.

Background information
- Origin: Brooklyn, New York
- Genres: Funk, Jam band
- Years active: 2008–2022
- Labels: Galaxy Smith, Electric Habitat

Turkuaz was an American funk band based in Brooklyn, New York.

== History ==
Turkuaz originally formed out of Boston's Berklee College of Music scene in 2008, releasing the Dollar Store demo album while many of its members were still attending Berklee. After relocating to New York City, they released their self-titled debut album in 2011. Within the same year, they also released their sophomore album, Zerbert. Their third studio album, Digitonium, a concept album composed to synchronize with Disney's The Sword in the Stone, was released in 2015.

The band did three performances of the music of Paul McCartney and Wings with original band member Denny Laine in 2018.

Turkuaz's fourth studio album, Life in the City, was released in 2018.

In 2020, Turkuaz released their first live concert film entitled None's a Ton, along with an audio soundtrack.

After collaborating with Jerry Harrison of Talking Heads in the studio, Turkuaz was asked to participate in a 40th anniversary tour celebrating Remain in Light with Harrison and Talking Head's session guitarist Adrian Belew. The tour had been postponed due to the COVID-19 pandemic and was originally set to resume in 2021.

On November 2, 2021, seven band members announced via social media that they were leaving the band to focus on other projects. Over the next year, all former band members became involved in several different projects. In March 2022, Ghost Light announced former Turkuaz bassist Taylor Shell would be joining their band. In July 2022, the seven members that left Turkuaz formed a new band, Cool Cool Cool. They played their first show at the Brooklyn Bowl on September 17, 2022. In September 2022, Turkuaz released two final studio albums, Paradiso and Apollyon. The albums were recorded prior to the band's dissolution, with founding members Dave Brandwein and Taylor Shell deciding to release the albums after the departure of the rest of the band.

In November 2022, Jerry Harrison and Adrian Belew announced a North American tour celebrating the Talking Heads album Remain in Light, with the members of Cool Cool Cool comprising most of the band, as well as being the supporting act.

In December 2022, Dave Brandwein released his debut solo album, Sleeping Sun, Waking Moon, under the pseudonym Band For Sale.

== Members ==
Turkuaz went through several lineup changes, with Dave Brandwein and Taylor Shell being the only members consistently in the band from 2008 to 2022. The band remained with a consistent studio and touring lineup from 2014 through 2021, with members Dave Brandwein, Taylor Shell, Sammi Garrett, Shira Elias, Craig Brodhead, Josh Schwartz, Greg Sanderson, Chris Brouwers, and Michelangelo Carubba.

Former members

- Dave Brandwein – vocals, guitar (2008–2021)
- Taylor Shell – bass guitar (2008–2021)
- Mike Haziza – guitar (2008–2011)
- Craig Brodhead – guitar, keyboards (2011–2021)
- Josh Schwartz – tenor sax (2011–2021)
- Greg Sanderson – alto sax (2011–2021)
- Chris Brouwers – trumpet (2011–2021)
- Michelangelo Carubba – drums, percussion (2011–2021)
- Geneva Williams – vocals, percussion (2011–2014)
- Chris St. Hilaire – organ (2011–2012)
- Nicky Egan – vocals (2011–2012)
- Sammi Garett – vocals, percussion (2012–2021)
- Shira Elias – vocals, percussion (2014–2021)

== Discography ==
Albums

- 2011: Turkuaz
- 2011: Zerbert
- 2013: Covers Vol. 1
- 2014: Future 86
- 2015: Digitonium
- 2018: Life in the City
- 2020: Covers Vol. 2
- 2022: Paradiso
- 2022: Apollyon

Singles & EPs

- 2008: Dollar Store (EP)
- 2015: Stereochrome (EP)
- 2016: "The Rules"/"On the Border" (7” Split EP with The New Mastersounds)
- 2017: "On the Run" (Single)
- 2019: Afterlife Vol. 1 (EP)
- 2019: Afterlife Vol. 2 (EP)
- 2019: Kuadrochrome (EP)
- 2020: "Ophidiophobia" (Single)
- 2021: "Shakin' in my Sheets" (Single)
- 2022: "Strange People (Strange Times)"/"Feel No Pain" (Single)
- 2022: "Knock, Knock"/"Take a Little Look Around" (Single)

Live Releases

- 2012: Live at Southpaw 6.1.10
- 2013: A Live Affair
- 2017: 040717
- 2019: Turkuaz Live at Sugarshack Sessions – EP
- 2020: None’s a Ton: A Turkuaz Live Concert Film Soundtrack
