= Brandon Niederauer =

American guitarist

- Born: March 16, 2003 (age 23); Dix Hills, New York
- Other name: Taz
- Musical career
- Genres: Blues; Soul; R&B; Blues rock; Rock and Roll
- Occupations: Guitarist, actor
- Instruments: Guitar, vocals
- Years active: 2011–present
- Website: www.tazguitar.com

External videos
- Brandon "Taz" Niederauer - "My Revival" - CME Session

Brandon "Taz" Niederauer (born March 16, 2003) is an American guitarist and actor from Dix Hills, New York. He starred in the musical School of Rock on Broadway. Nicknamed 'Taz' by his guitar teacher, William Mignoli, because his frenetic playing reminded Mignoli of the Tazmanian Devil from Looney Tunes cartoons, he has appeared on many television shows including: The Ellen Show, The Late Show with Stephen Colbert, Good Morning America, The View, and She's Gotta Have It.

== Career ==
Niederauer starred on Broadway in School of Rock the Musical. Before he was 15 years old he had played guitar with Gregg Allman, Derek Trucks, Warren Haynes, Stevie Nicks, Lady Gaga and Buddy Guy. He played with the German rock band Scorpions. During a 2017 birthday celebration for musician Col. Bruce Hampton, Niederauer was playing a guitar solo on stage when Hampton suddenly collapsed and died. Nobody knew the quirky Hampton had actually died, and so the show continued for several minutes: Hampton was eventually taken backstage and then taken away by ambulance and pronounced dead.

In 2018, he garnered widespread attention over a tweet of himself playing the National Anthem on guitar. He also performed guitar in the orchestra in Jesus Christ Superstar Live in Concert.

He has since performed the National Anthem on guitar at Wrigley Field before a Chicago Cubs baseball game in 2019, as well as during the opening ceremonies of the 2020 AFC Championship Game at Arrowhead Stadium on January 24, 2021.

In 2021, he enrolled as an undergraduate at Yale University, where he is an economics major.

=== Acting ===
- In 2015, he played the role of Zack in School of Rock the Musical on Broadway.
- In 2016, he played the role of Bartholomew in the movie, Here Comes Rusty.
- In 2019 he played the role of Virgil in Spike Lee’s Netflix series, She’s Gotta Have It.

=== Signature guitar ===
In 2019 D'Angelico Guitars released a signature Brandon “Taz” Niederauer model of their Atlantic guitar.
