= Twiddle (band) =

American jam band

- Origin: Castleton, Vermont, United States
- Genres: Reggae rock; funk rock; jam band
- Years active: 2004–2023, 2026
- Label: JamFlow Records
- Past members: Mihali Savoulidis; Ryan Dempsey; Zdenek Gubb; Adrian Tramontano; Billy Comstock; Brook Jordan
- Website: twiddlemusic.com

Twiddle is American rock band. They are a jam band, and utilize instrumental improvisation in their live performances. They incorporate their influences from a variety of music genres, including rock, jazz, bluegrass, reggae, and funk. As of July 21st, 2026, Twiddle has released a new single and announced three shows at the Capitol Theatre in Port Chester, New York.

== History ==
Twiddle formed at Castleton State College in Vermont in 2004. The members of the band are Mihali Savoulidis (guitar, vocals), Ryan Dempsey (keyboards, vocals), Zdenek Gubb (bass, vocals), and Brook Jordan (drums, percussion, vocals). As with many likeminded jam bands, the group toured frequently in American regions where the musical style remains enduringly popular, such as the Northeast, the Northwest, and Colorado.

Twiddle holds an annual festival called Tumble Down at Burlington Waterfront Park in Vermont.

In 2022, Jordan took a hiatus from the band. Kung Fu's Adrian Tramontano is currently filling in for Jordan.

On November 29, 2022, Savoulidis announced that the band will be taking an indefinite hiatus for the foreseeable future with 2023 being their last year touring. Twiddle played their final three shows during their Frendsgiving on November 23–25, 2023 at the Capitol Theatre in Port Chester, New York.

On July 18th, 2026, Twiddle teased via social media a reunion. Following the announcement, on July 21st, they released their new single, titled “Good Time”.

In addition to the release, Twiddle announced a three night run at the Capitol Theatre in Port Chester, New York for Frendsgiving, November 27-29, 2026.

== Members ==
=== Band members ===
- Mihali Savoulidis – guitar, lead vocals (2004–present)
- Ryan Dempsey – keyboards, keytar, vocals (2004–present)
- Zdenek Gubb – bass, vocals (2007–present)
- Adrian Tramontano – drums, percussion, acoustic guitar, vocals (2022–present)

Former members

- Brook Jordan – drums, acoustic guitar, vocals (2004–2022)
- Billy Comstock – bass (2004–2007)

== Discography ==
- The Natural Evolution of Consciousness – 2007
- Somewhere on the Mountain – 2011
- Live at Nectar's – 2014
- Plump: Chapter One – 2015; remastered and rereleased in 2017
- Plump: Chapter Two – 2017
- Live from Tumble Down 2018 – 2018
- Every Last Leaf - 2022
