= Holly Bowling =

American pianist and keyboardist

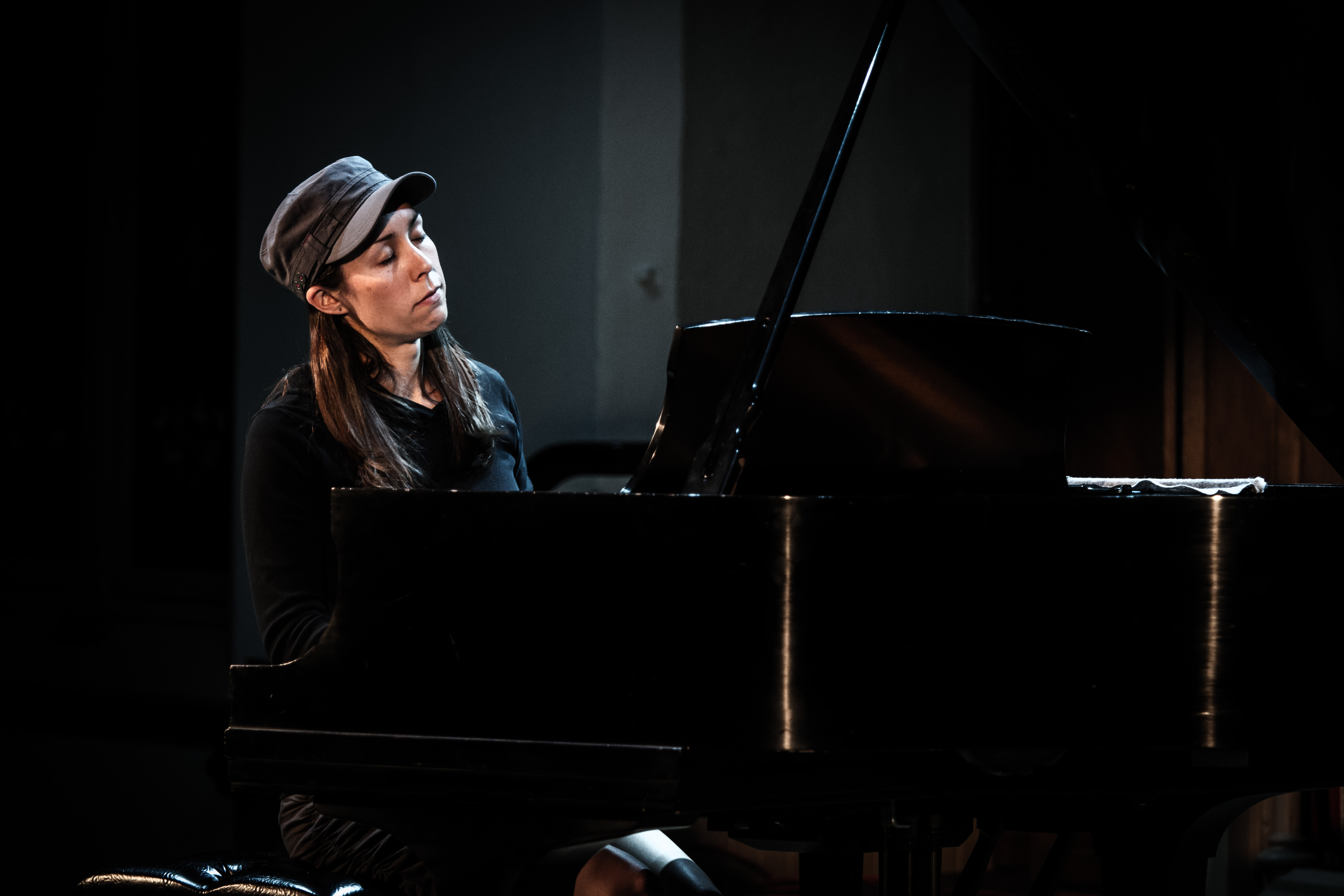

Background information
- Born: Holly Earnest; May 11, 1984 (age 41)
- Genres: Classical, Rock, Improvisational rock, Jam band, Psychedelic rock
- Occupation: Musician
- Instruments: Piano, Keyboards
- Years active: 2014 – present
- Label: Royal Potato Family
- Website: www.hollybowling.com

Holly Bowling (born May 11, 1984) is an American pianist, and keyboardist based in San Francisco. She is known for her solo instrumental performances in addition to her work with Ghost Light, Phil Lesh and Friends, and Greensky Bluegrass. She was named by Rolling Stone as one of "Ten New Artists You Need To Know Right Now."

== Early life ==
Bowling grew up in Michigan and began playing piano at age 5 under the Suzuki method.

== Career ==
=== Solo career ===
Bowling's work originally focused on instrumental arrangements pulled from the songbooks of bands such as the Grateful Dead and Phish. Her career ignited when she released a solo piano performance mirroring a passage of extended improvisation from Phish's 7/30/13 concert near Lake Tahoe, followed by a rendition of the Grateful Dead's “Eyes of the World" from their 6/18/74 Freedom Hall show. Subsequent years saw Bowling's intricate arrangements shift from being the focal point of her live shows to serving as bookends guiding listeners through long stretches of improvisation, peppered with extended techniques that stretch the intended limits of the instrument.

Bowling has released four instrumental piano albums beginning with 2015's Distillation of a Dream: the Music of Phish Reimagined for Solo Piano. Her second album, Better Left Unsung, a collection of solo piano arrangements of the Grateful Dead, followed in 2016 and reached its peak position on the Billboard Classical Albums charts at #25. The album release party for Better Left Unsung was held at Phil Lesh's Terrapin Crossroads and the night of the album release, Bowling performed with Bob Weir at the Orange Peel in Asheville, North Carolina, during Warren Haynes’ Christmas Jam.

Bowling's first live album, Live at the Old Church, was released in 2019 and chronicles her September 21, 2018 performance in Portland, Oregon. Her second album of Grateful Dead staples, Seeking All That’s Still Unsung, was released in 2020 and charted in the top ten of Billboard's Classical Crossover category.

In 2020, Bowling released a series of eleven performances filmed in remote outdoor settings across the United States titled The Wilderness Sessions. Locations included Yosemite National Park, South Dakota's Badlands, Wyoming's Beartooth Mountains, and Utah's Bonneville Salt Flats, the latter of which saw an official release as a 2-LP set.

In addition to the Wilderness Sessions, Bowling also filmed and released a series of nine live-streamed home concerts during the pandemic titled Alone Together: The Living Room Sessions.

=== Bands, collaborations and guest appearances ===
In 2018, Bowling co-founded improvisational rock outfit Ghost Light with guitarist Tom Hamilton Jr. They released two records as a five-piece, Best Kept Secrets and The Healing before Bowling announced her departure from the band in December 2022.

In 2021, Bowling formed Lacuna with Tom Hamilton Jr. as an acoustic improvisation duo. They released a self-titled album and played select shows to support the release.

Bowling regularly appears on keyboards with Phil Lesh and Friends as well as with Greensky Bluegrass.

Artists she has shared the stage with include:

Phil Lesh, Bob Weir, Page McConnell, Warren Haynes, John Scofield, Ivan Neville, Steve Kimock, Oteil Burbridge, Dave Schools, Branford Marsalis, Marco Benevento, Claude Coleman Jr., Duane Trucks, Natalie Cressman, Jennifer Hartswick, Jim James, Greensky Bluegrass, Railroad Earth, Don Was, Robert Randolph, Billy Strings, Sam Bush, Bela Fleck, Tony Hall, Ross James, Tom Hamilton Jr, Dan Lebowitz, Jay Lane, Scott Law, Reed Mathis, Neal Casal, Karl Denson, Steve Berlin, John Molo, Rick Mitarotonda, James Casey, Umphrey's McGee, and LP Giobbi.

== Discography ==
2015-08-10 Distillation of a Dream: The Music of Phish Reimagined for Solo Piano
2016-12-09 Better Left Unsung: The Music of the Grateful Dead Reimagined for Solo Piano
2021-03-22 Best Kept Secrets: Ghost Light
2019-08-23 Live at the Old Church: Solo piano recorded 9/21/2018 at the Old Church Concert Hall in Portland, OR
2020-11-20 Seeking All That's Still Unsung: Solo piano renditions of the music of the Grateful Dead
2021-02-11 Live from the Salt Flats: Solo piano from the Wilderness Sessions
2021-11-19 Lacuna: Duo album with Tom Hamilton
2022-10-07 The Healing: Ghost Light
