= Dopapod =

American rock band

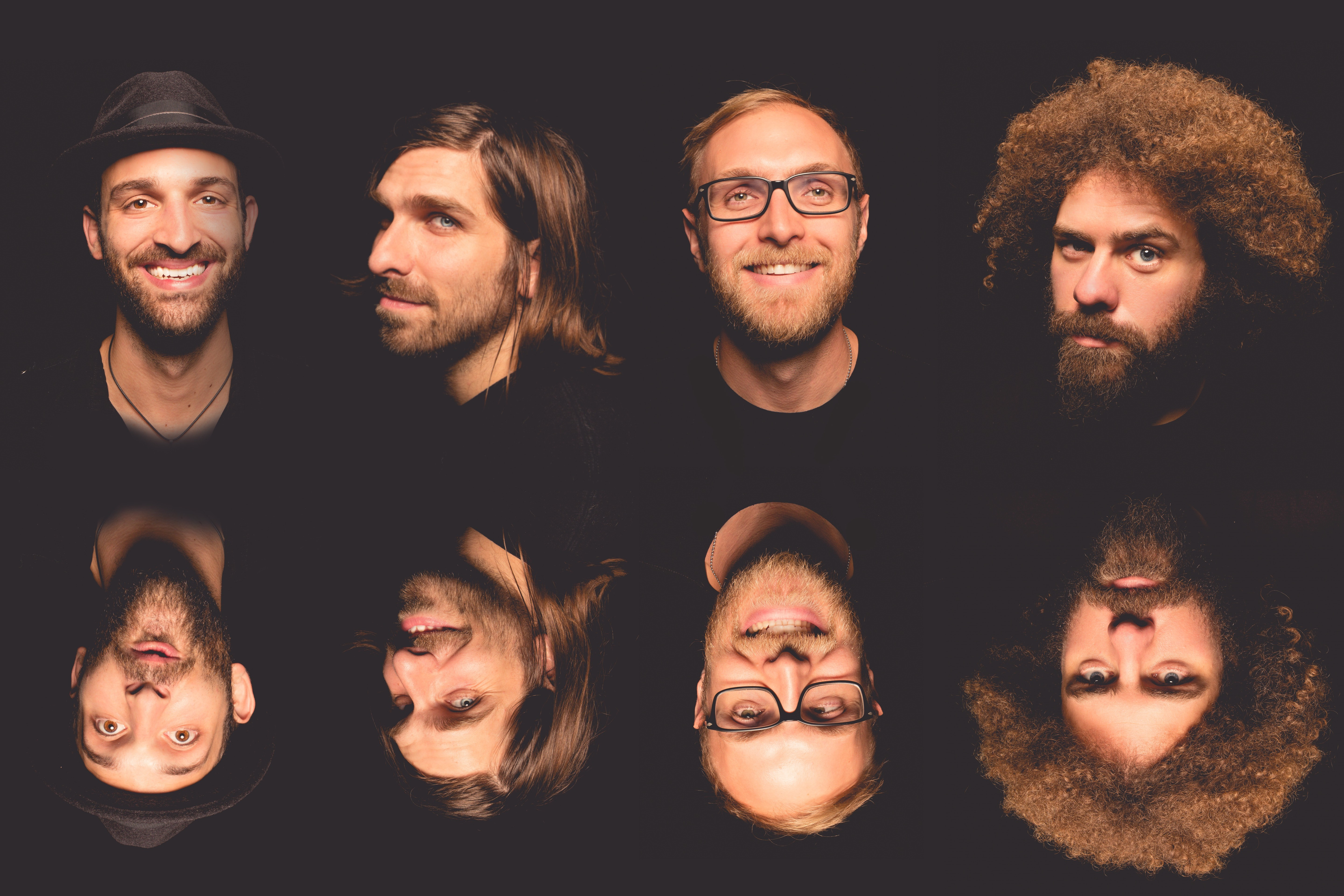

Background information
- Origin: Boston, Massachusetts, USA
- Genres: Jam rock, progressive rock
- Years active: 2008–2024
- Label: Dopapod Records
- Members: Eli Winderman; Rob Compa; Chuck Jones; Neal “Fro” Evans
- Past members: Scotty Zwang; Michelangelo Carubba
- Website: http://dopapod.com/

Dopapod was an American rock band from Boston, Massachusetts. Although classified as a jam band, Dopapod incorporates bits of funk, heavy metal, jazz fusion, progressive rock, and country. They have self-released nine studio albums, and spent most of their time touring.

== History ==
=== Early years ===
Dopapod was formed at Boston's Berklee College of Music in 2008, as a duo with Eli Winderman and drummer Michelangelo Carubba. They performed in this format around New England for a year or so before adding fellow Berklee student, Rob Compa on guitar. After a year as a trio, they added Chuck Jones on bass—who at the time had another band and with Winderman called The Actual Proof—and Neal Evans on percussion. In 2010, Carubba became the full-time drummer for Turkuaz and Evans took over drums for Dopapod. The band split with Evans in 2013, and he was replaced by Scotty Zwang until Evans returned in 2016.

=== Touring ===
After releasing their debut album, Radar in 2009, Dopapod began touring the next year on their own and on bills with other artists. The band appeared on the 2015 Bonnaroo lineup and was cited by Rolling Stone as Bonnaroo's “Best-Kept Secret” comparing them to Phish, Disco Biscuits and Frank Zappa.

Other dates included opening for String Cheese Incident in Red Rocks, Colorado in 2015; joining Ween, Greyboy Allstars, The Nth Power with The Spirit Horns (Natalie Cressman & James Casey of Trey Anastasio Band) and more in 2017 at California's High Sierra Music Festival; as well as performing on the Jam Cruise 15 to Jamaica with Widespread Panic, Ivan Neville, Percy Hall, among others.

The band's 2017 tour included multi-night dates in the same city, explained by the Boston Globe as giving “the group a more open hand to improvise, aware that its jam-hungry fans are seeking a unique live experience each night.”

=== Recordings ===
Since its inception, Dopapod has released nine studio albums. All but two of these albums have titles that are palindromes, and the two that do not form a palindrome when put together. Besides one track with vocals (“Bet on Tales” from Radar), their first two projects, Radar in 2009 and Drawn Onward in 2011 were instrumentals. Redivider, which was released in 2012, was the first album to feature consistent vocals by Compa and Winderman, which continued on subsequent albums.

Dopapod makes recordings of their live shows available on its website, including I Saw Live Dopapod Evil Was I out in 2011, and II Saw Live Dopapod Evil Was II from 2017.

In 2016, the band were at Mountain Star Studios, Black Hawk, Colorado, in the middle of winter to record a new album, MEGAGEM. The album was released October 2017. “A lot of the new songs infuse hip-hop beats with the progressive rock sound we’ve been experimenting with for the last few years. It feels like uncharted territory, at least for us,” explained Winderman in Mountain Xpress newspaper.

Dopapod finished 2017 with a national tour, and took a year off to spend time with family and friends and work on new material.

Dopapod released Aiboh on April 20, 2024. At the time, it was their only studio release to have a non-palindromic title. They released Phobia shortly thereafter on April 25. Together, the two titles form the word aibohphobia, a nonstandard term for a supposed irrational fear of palindromes. Dopapod played their final show on New Years Eve, 2024.

== Discography ==
=== Studio albums ===
- Radar (2009)
- Drawn Onward (2011)
- Redivider (2012)
- Never Odd or Even (2014)
- Megagem (2017)
- Emit Time (2019)
- Dopapod (2022)
- Aiboh (2024)
- Phobia (2024)

=== Live albums ===
- I Saw Live Dopapod Evil Was I (2011)
- II Saw Live Dopapod Evil Was II (2017)
- Live at the Capitol Theatre (2019)
- Coloradopapod (2023)
- New Years Eve (2025)

=== Singles ===
- "Picture in Picture" (2014)
- "Please Haalp" (2017)
- "Mucho" (2017)
- "Numbers Need Humans" (2019)
- "Test of Time" (2019)
- “November” (2019)
- “Dracula’s Monk” (2020)
- "Think" (2021)
- "Grow" (2022)
- "Black Holes (2022)
