= Big Something =

American alternative rock band

- Origin: Burlington, North Carolina, United States
- Genres: Alternative rock; electronic; funk; Jam Band
- Years active: 2009–present
- Label: Truth Serum Records
- Members: Nick MacDaniels - Lead Vocals; Matt Laird - Bass (2023–); Josh Kagel - Keys, Trumpet; Casey Cranford - Sax, EWI; Jesse Hensley - Lead Guitar; Ben Vinograd - Drums
- Past members: Doug Marshall - Bass (–2023)
- Website: www.bigsomething.net

Big Something is an American alternative rock band based in Burlington, North Carolina.

Big Something is known for their high-energy live performances and are a popular staple at many music festivals. They have opened for The B-52s, Robert Randolph and the Family Band, Galactic, Umphrey's McGee and other bands in their genre. Big Something also hosts their own annual music festival, The Big What, in Mebane, North Carolina.

The band has released seven studio albums, as well as a number of live recordings. Their first studio album, Songs From the Middle of Nowhere, won the Home Grown Music Network's 2010 Album of the Year award.

== History ==
The band started in the Maryland area under the name "anonymous" before evolving into Big Something.

Big Something formed in 2009 and released their first studio album, Songs from the Middle of Nowhere, in 2010. Between studio recordings, the band released a live album Live from Uranus. The band then released their second, self-titled album in 2013. The sophomore album garnered three different Album of the Year awards from Angelica Music, Endless Boundaries radio, and the Home Grown Music Network.

The band released a third studio album, Truth Serum, in November 2014. The release was preceded by two singles, "Megalodon" and "Capt. D". In the winter of 2016, the band toured with improvisational rock band The Werks.

During this time the band gained popularity, touring throughout the United States and playing the Telluride The Ride Festival in Colorado for the first time in the summer of 2016. They also began being featured on Sirius XM Radio's Jam On station.

The band released the single "Tumbleweed" in December 2016 in anticipation for the 2017 release of their album of the same name.

Bassist Doug Marshall retired from touring in March 2023, replaced by Matt Laird.

== Discography ==
Albums

- 2010: Stories from the Middle of Nowhere
- 2013: Big Something
- 2014: Truth Serum
- 2017: Tumbleweed
- 2018: The Otherside
- 2020: Escape
- 2022: Escape from the Living Room (live album)
- 2023: Headspace

Singles

- 2016: Tumbleweed
- 2018: Sundown Nomad
- 2018: Wildfire
- 2020: Heavy
- 2020: The Breakers
- 2020: Timebomb
- 2020: Dangerous
- 2021: Machines (Unplugged)
- 2022: Moonage Daydream
