= American Babies =

American indie rock band

- Origin: Philadelphia, Pennsylvania, U.S.
- Genres: Americana, indie rock, progressive rock
- Years active: 2007 – present
- Labels: SCI Fidelity, Engine Room, The Royal Potato Family
- Spinoff of: Brothers Past
- Members: Tom Hamilton; Alex Smith; Justin Mazer; Raina Mullen
- Past members: Joe Russo; Scott Metzger; David Butler; Eric Slick; Nick Bockrath
- Website: www.americanbabies.net

American Babies are an indie rock-Americana band from Philadelphia that is led by guitarist and producer Tom Hamilton. Since forming in 2007, the band has released three full-length records and two EPs. The band has performed across the United States including appearances at South by Southwest, Electric Forest, Wakarusa, and Gathering of the Vibes.

== History ==
The band was originally formed in 2007 by Tom Hamilton as a recording project to explore different styles of music from his then-current band, Brothers Past. Having grown up listening to Americana musicians like Johnny Cash and Merle Haggard, Hamilton wrote a batch of songs that fell into this genre. Enlisting drummer Joe Russo, keyboardist Aron Magner, and a few other friends, these songs turned into American Babies' self-titled release that came out in 2008 on SCI Fidelity Records. Touring behind this record was sparse but featured showcases at Newport Folk Festival, Langerado Music Festival, and music industry events CMJ and SxSW.

By 2010 Hamilton's creative focus switched from Brothers Past to American Babies. He moved back to his hometown of Philadelphia, PA and started to write new material. With the help of producer Bill Moriarty, American Babies' second LP, "Flawed Logic" was made. This album had a much broader range of topics, lyrically. Hamilton cites the Great Recession of 2008 and the congruent wars in Iraq and Afghanistan as large influences on the record. Upon the album's release on April 1, 2011 via Engine Room Recordings, Hamilton put together a steady backing band and started to tour regularly.

In December 2012 Hamilton started work on American Babies' third full-length LP. After a couple of months of writing and demoing songs in his house, Hamilton linked up with childhood friend/producer/engineer Peter Tramo and went into his Philadelphia-based Lorelei Studios to start recording. The resulting album saw a wider range of sounds and musical leanings, and a continuation of exploring broader lyrical themes. Described by Hamilton as a "forty-minute existential meltdown," the album "Knives and Teeth" tackles weighty subject matter including sin, redemption, politics, and mortality. It was released October 15, 2013 via The Royal Potato Family.

It was announced in December 2015 that American Babies will release their fourth studio album on March 18, 2016. entitled "An Epic Battle Between Light and Dark" via The Royal Potato Family.

American Babies' touring lineup consists of drummer Alex Smith, guitarist Justin Mazer, vocalist/acoustic guitarist Raina Mullen, and bassist Mark Sosnoskie.

== Discography ==
- 2008 American Babies SCI Fidelity
- 2010 "Weight of the World" EP Shoots and Boots
- 2011 Flawed Logic Engine Room Recordings
- 2013 Knives and Teeth Royal Potato Family
- 2014 "Stark and Red" EP Royal Potato Family
- 2016 "An Epic Battle Between Light and Dark" Royal Potato Family
