= Pigeons Playing Ping Pong =

American jam band

- Origin: Baltimore, Maryland, United States
- Genre: Funk
- Years active: 2009–present
- Members: Greg Ormont; Jeremy Schon; Alex Petropulos; Ben Carrey; Jon Brady
- Past members: Dan Schwartz
- Website: pigeonsplayingpingpong.com

Pigeons Playing Ping Pong is an American funk jam band from Baltimore, Maryland. The band has garnered a following as a result of their consistent touring, playing as many as two hundred shows a year.

== History ==
Pigeons Playing Ping Pong began in 2009. The band released its first full-length album titled Funk E P in 2010. This album name is a play on words says vocalist/guitarist Greg Ormont, and unfortunately the name led people to think this first album was just an EP. In July 2014, Pigeons Playing Ping Pong released its second full-length album titled Psychology.

Pigeons Playing Ping Pong has hosted the Domefest music festival every year since 2009. The location of the festival has changed periodically but is currently held at Ace Adventure Resort in Minden, West Virginia.

In a 2017 interview, Greg Ormont (vocals/guitar) said, "We met in college at the University of Maryland and the dorm project turned into the real thing. We've been playing for over 8 years. We've been touring the country for 4–5 years and just having a blast spreading our high energy psychedelic funk and good vibes. We like to bring the party and show people a diverse time that is positive and fun and everyone leaves a happier person.”

In April of 2022, Pigeons Playing Ping Pong released its 6th studio album, Perspective.

In April of 2024, the band's seventh studio album, Day In Time, was released.

== Personnel ==
=== Band members ===
Current members

- Greg "Scrambled Greg" Ormont – lead vocals, guitar (2009–present)
- Jeremy Schon – guitar (2009–present)
- Ben Carrey – bass guitar (2009–present)
- Alex "Gator" Petropulos – drums, percussion (2015–present)
- Jon Brady - keys (2026-present)

Former members

- Dan Schwartz – drums, percussion (2009–2015)

=== Crew ===
- Manny Newman – lighting (2015–present)
- Ivan LaRocca – FOH engineering (2022–present)

=== Former Crew ===
- Erich Miller – FOH engineering (2016-2022)
- Dante DiLoreto – monitor engineering
- Kevin McKay – manager
- Aaron Kovelman – lighting

== Discography ==
Studio albums

- Funk E P (2010, self-released)
- Psychology (2014, self-released)
- Pleasure (2016, self-released)
- Pizazz (2017, self-released)
- Presto (2020, self-released)
- Perspective (2022, self-released)
- Day In Time (2024, self-released)
- Feed The Fire (2025)

Live Albums

- The Great Outdoors Jam (2017)
- Stop Making Cake: Halloween 2019 (Live in New Haven, CT) (2020)
- Live at The Capitol Theatre (2025)
