= Aron Magner =

American musician

Aron Magner (born April 23, 1976) is a Philadelphia-based musician, keyboardist and founding member of The Disco Biscuits.

== Early life ==
Magner was classically trained on the piano. Magner was enrolled in the University of Pennsylvania before pursuing a career as a musician.

== Career ==
Magner's early musical influences included jazz and classical music, and led him to formal piano training. Soon after, he discovered David Bowie, Pink Floyd, The Doors, and similar artists.

After graduating from Lower Merion High School, Magner enrolled in the University of Pennsylvania, where Marc Brownstein and Jon Gutwillig had begun casually playing in musical jam sessions together. A friend recommended Magner to them, and the three began playing fraternity parties and other social events, often under different names each night such as "Party Tent." This was the beginnings of The Disco Biscuits. Magner is the only member of The Disco Biscuits to perform in all of the band's public performances.

In 1999, Magner and The Disco Biscuits founded the now-annual Camp Bisco music festival, which began with an attendance of 900 and had grown to a sold out capacity of 25,000 in 2011. It was featured in The New York Times and other publications as a model for bands in the changing music industry. The Disco Biscuits, through the creation of Camp Bisco, by headlining events at venues such as Red Rocks Amphitheatre amidst national touring, and by creating destination festivals such as Dominican Holidaze, have been instrumental in bringing live and studio improvisational, electronic-based music to the live music scene and to popular culture.

Magner has also contributed to, and been a member of, other bands such as: Conspirator, Electron, Spaga, Brain Damaged Eggmen, The Join, and Acoustic Again.

In late 2014 Magner joined Bill Kreutzmann's band Billy & the Kids. This was following performing with Kreutzmann at the 2014 Lockn Festival with a band billed as Bill Kreutzmann's Locknstep Allstars.

== Charitable ==
Magner serves on the board of directors of Philadelphia Young Playwrights, along with his father Alan, an organization that his mother Adele founded. The program features a curriculum to inspire students’ literacy, learning, and creativity through playwriting and a love of the arts.

Magner has supported a number of nonprofit organizations tied to the live music scene, including HeadCount. In March 2010, Magner and The Disco Biscuits performed a benefit concert at Brooklyn's Brooklyn Bowl which generated the revenue needed to fund and install a $30,000 solar energy system at Greenfield Elementary, a public school located in Center City Philadelphia. Magner and The Disco Biscuits were involved with selecting the Greenfield project, and helped ensure its completion. The project was orchestrated by HeadCount. He also participated virtually in the High Holiday services streamed from the Relix Studio and Brooklyn Bowl via FANS.

On June 23, 2020, during the COVID pandemic, The Disco Biscuits performed a virtual fundraiser performance to benefit the PLUS1 for Black Lives Fund (a nonprofit developed "to fight against anti-black racism and violence in the U.S.") on the same baseball field where Philadelphia's very own baseball team, the "Phillies" play their home games. Over $75,000 was raised by the concert that provided grants to other nonprofits, including The Equal Justice Initiative, Impact Justice and The Bail Project.
