= The London Souls =

- Origin: New York City, New York, US
- Genres: Rock and roll
- Years active: 2008–2018
- Labels: Round Hill; Feel
- Past members: Tash Neal; Chris St. Hilaire

The London Souls were an American, New York City based rock and roll band active from 2008 to 2018.

== Formation and The London Souls ==
Tash Neal and Chris St. Hilaire met in New York City as teenagers, jamming for the first time in hourly rehearsal rooms with friends. They shared a passion for songwriting and improvisation, and in 2008 formed The London Souls.

Their song "She's So Mad" has received airplay on FOX TV's show Fearless Music. Also, their song "I Think I Like It" was used in a commercial advertising NBA star Derrick Rose's line of shoes by Adidas.

Their debut self-titled album was released on July 12, 2011.

On November 16, 2012, The London Souls announced they would release their third album Here Come The Girls on January 8, 2013. The release was delayed due to injuries sustained by Tash Neal during a hit and run accident. The album was released on April 7, 2015.

== Past members ==
- Tash Neal - Guitar/vocals
- Chris St. Hilaire - Drums/vocals

== Discography ==
- What You Need - 2009 (Unreleased & Self Produced - 16 Tracks)
- The London Souls - 2011
- Here Come The Girls - 2015
