= Greensky Bluegrass =

American bluegrass band

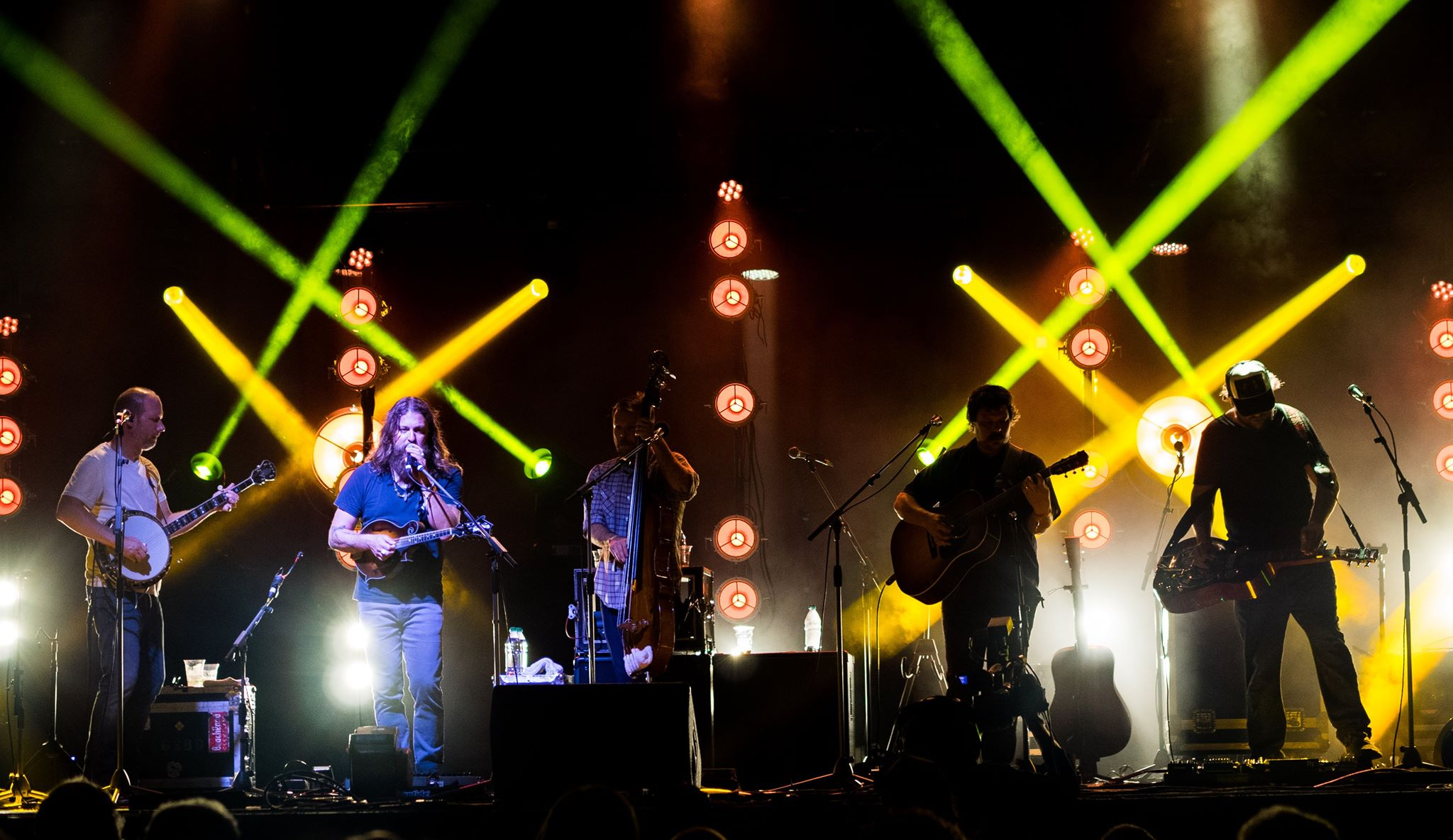
- From left to right: Michael Bont (banjo/vocals), Paul Hoffman (mandolin/vocals), Mike Devol (bass/vocals), David Bruzza (guitar/vocals), Anders Beck (dobro).

Background information
- Origin: Kalamazoo, Michigan, U.S.
- Genres: Bluegrass; jam band
- Years active: 2000–present
- Label: Big Blue Zoo Records
- Members: Dave Bruzza; Paul Hoffman; Michael Bont; Anders Beck; Mike Devol
- Past members: Chris Carr; Al Bates
- Website: www.greenskybluegrass.com

Greensky Bluegrass is a five-piece American bluegrass jam band founded in Kalamazoo, Michigan in mid-2000. The band has evolved over the years, growing from 3 to 5 members, adding electric effects, and touring with a full light show. Partly because of their name, many articles written about the band address the fact that what Greensky does is "not quite" bluegrass. In their own promotional material, GSBG describes their sound as "their own version of bluegrass music, mixing the acoustic stomp of a string band with the rule-breaking spirit of rock & roll".

== Career ==
The band was formed in the fall of 2000 by Michael Arlen Bont (banjo), Dave Bruzza (guitar), and Paul Hoffman (mandolin), who initially played together at an open mic night. As newcomers to the bluegrass scene, the three drew upon an array of influences and varied musical backgrounds, reflected in their May 2004 release of Less than Supper, recorded with bassist Chris Carr and dobro player Al Bates. Both Carr and Bates left the band shortly thereafter. Classical cellist Michael Devol had approached Greensky with an offer to assist in management, but ended up joining the group as bassist in the fall of 2004. The group explains their cohesion to being more of a brotherhood than a band.

In the summer of 2006 the band were winners of the Telluride Bluegrass Festival Band Competition, earning them a spot on the main stage of the 2007 festival. Soon thereafter they released their second studio album, Tuesday Letter, produced by Tim Carbone of Railroad Earth. They rounded out their line-up in 2007 when they added Dobroist Anders Beck.

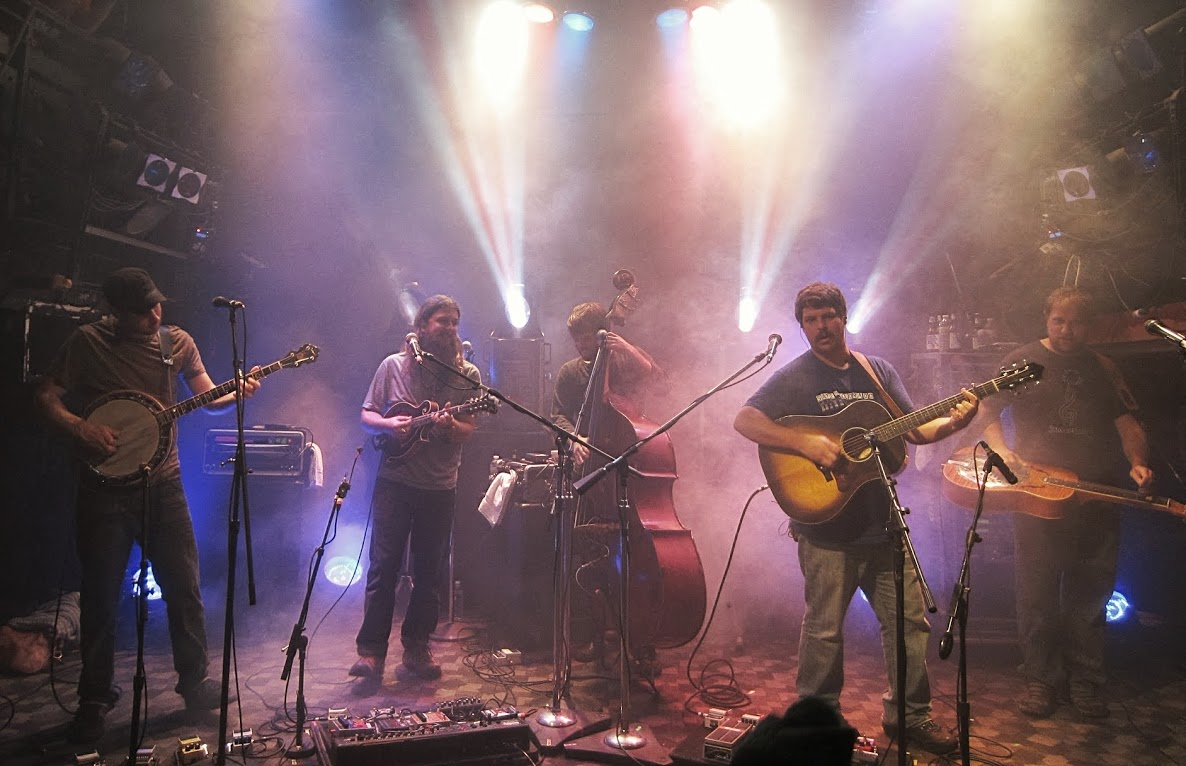
Greensky Bluegrass at the 8x10 Club in Baltimore, January 2012

On September 23, 2016 Greensky Bluegrass released their album Shouted, Written Down & Quoted produced by Steve Berlin of Los Lobos and Co-Produced/Engineered, Mixed and Mastered by Glenn Brown. The bulk of this album was recorded in Asheville, North Carolina in October, 2015. Greensky Bluegrass continued touring, and on January 10, 2020, they released Courage for the Road: Fall 2019 (Live), the first part of two live albums released that year. They followed it with Courage for the Road: Winter 2020 (Live) in March 2020.

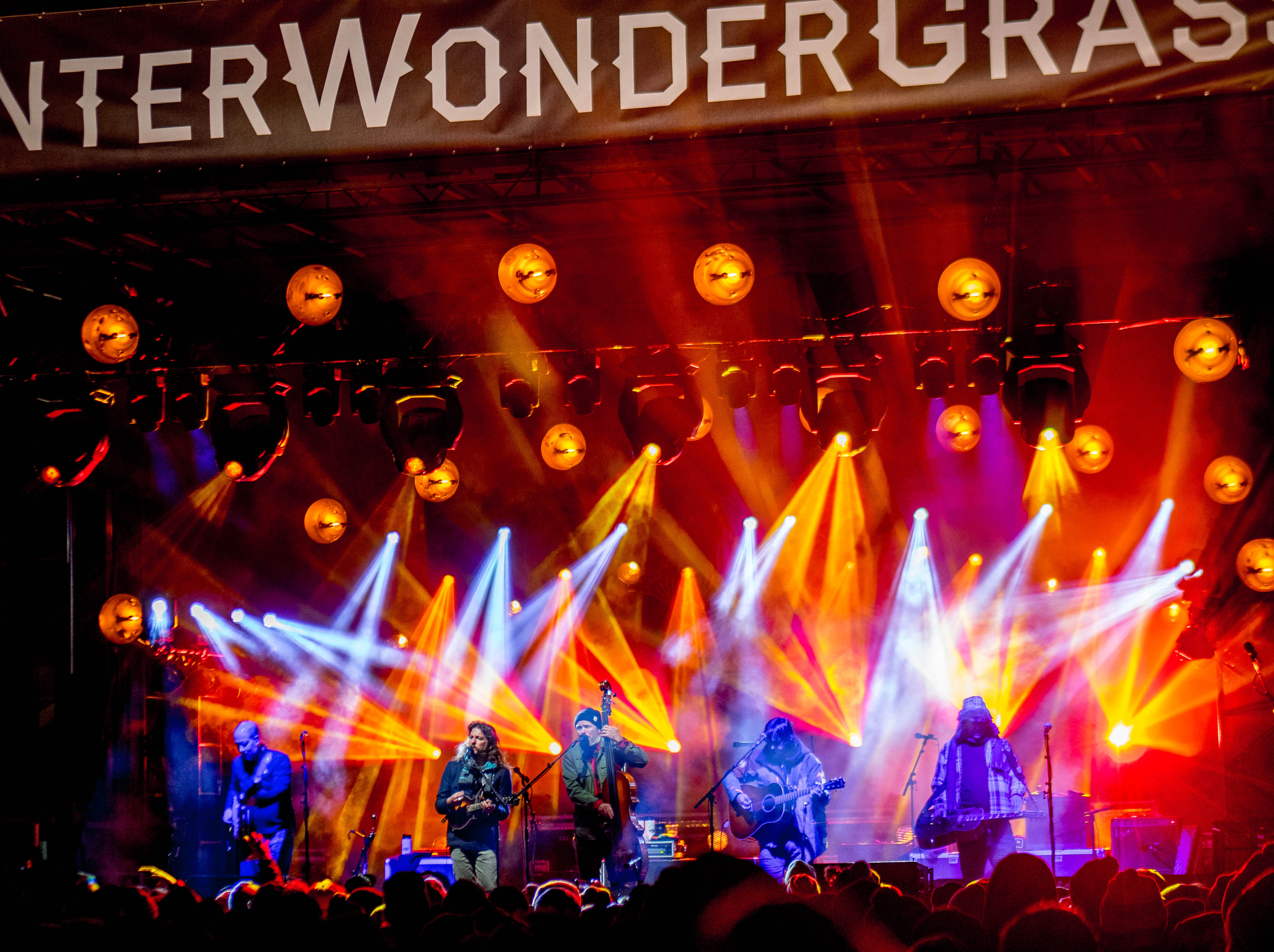
Greensky Bluegrass performs at WinterWonderGrass in Steamboat Springs, Co. on Feb. 22, 2020.

On January 21, 2022, they released the album Stress Dreams, produced, recorded, mixed and mastered by Glenn Brown.

== Collaborations ==
On-stage collaborations have paired Greensky Bluegrass with:

- Phil Lesh
- Bill Kreutzmann & Papa Mali
- Cornmeal
- Larry Keel
- Railroad Earth
- Sam Bush
- Billy Strings
- Yonder Mountain String Band
- Jon Fishman
- Holly Bowling
- Tom Hamilton
- Goose

== Discography ==
Title	Album details	Peak chart positions		
Title	Album details	US Grass	US	US Indie
Less Than Supper	Release date: 2004; Label: Big Blue Zoo	—	—	—
Tuesday Letter	Release date: August 2, 2006; Label: Big Blue Zoo	—	—	—
Live at Bell's	Release date: 2007; Label: Big Blue Zoo	—	—	—
Five Interstates	Release date: September 9, 2008; Label: Big Blue Zoo	—	—	—
All Access Vol. 1	Release date: 2009; Label: Big Blue Zoo	—	—	—
All Access Vol. 2	Release date: December 14, 2010; Label: Big Blue Zoo	—	—	—
Handguns	Release date: October 2, 2011; Label: Big Blue Zoo	3	—	—
If Sorrows Swim	Release date: September 9, 2014; Label: Big Blue Zoo	1	127	22
Shouted, Written Down & Quoted	Release date: September 23, 2016; Label: Big Blue Zoo	3	—	26
All for Money	Release Date: January 18, 2019; Label: Big Blue Zoo	1	—	17
Stress Dreams	Release Date: January 21, 2022; Label: Big Blue Zoo	2	—	—
XXV	Release Date: October 31, 2025; Label: Big Blue Zoo	1	—	—
"—" denotes releases that did not chart
