= Joe Russo's Almost Dead =

American rock/jam band

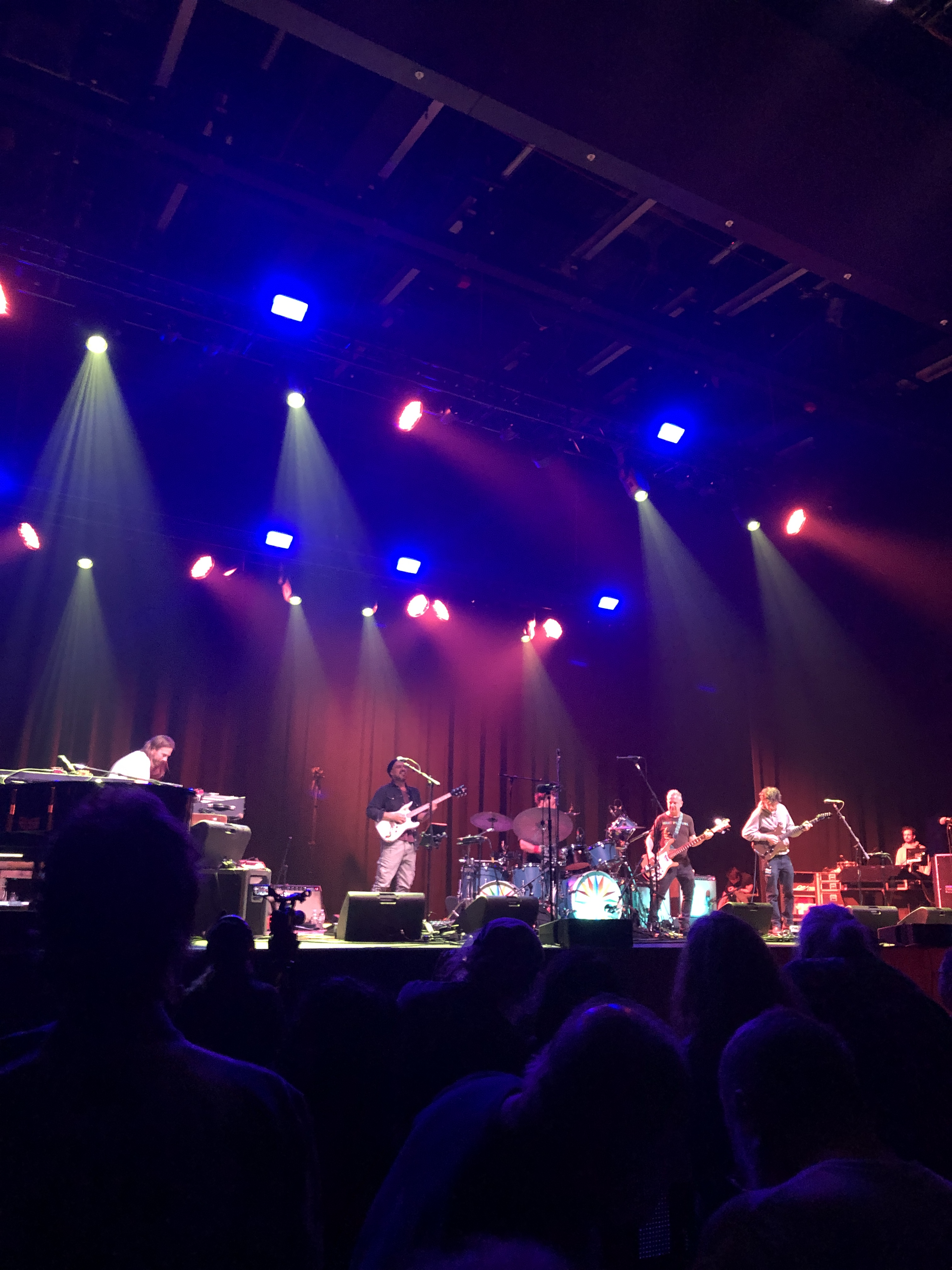
- Almost Dead at Wind Creek in Bethlehem PA, November 14, 2024

Background information
- Also known as: Almost Dead, JRAD
- Origin: Brooklyn, New York, United States
- Genres: Rock; jam rock
- Years active: 2013–present
- Members: Joe Russo; Dave Dreiwitz; Marco Benevento; Scott Metzger; Tom Hamilton

Joe Russo's Almost Dead is an American rock band formed in 2013 in Brooklyn, New York. The group is known for high-energy, improvisational reinterpretations of the Grateful Dead catalog rather than note-for-note tribute performances. Led by drummer Joe Russo, who had previously played Grateful Dead material with Furthur. The band features Russo's longtime collaborators Marco Benevento, Dave Dreiwitz, Scott Metzger, and Tom Hamilton.

== Performances ==
=== 2013 ===
The band's first concert was on January 26, 2013, at the Brooklyn Bowl in Brooklyn, New York for the second night of the Freaks Ball XIII. As Joe Russo recalls in the September 2017 Relix Magazine interview, he was supposed to play in the Dean Ween Group (Mickey Melchiondo from Ween's side project) on that second night but shortly before the date, Mickey cancelled the Dean Ween Group appearance and Joe pulled together Bustle In Your Hedgerow (Russo, Dreiwitz, Metzger and Benevento's Led Zeppelin band) and added Tom Hamilton to form Joe Russo's Almost Dead. JRAD played one more show that year at the Capitol Theatre in Port Chester, New York on December 27, 2013.

=== 2014 ===
JRAD slowly began playing more shows in 2014, including several sets at summer festivals including the Gathering of the Vibes in Bridgeport, Connecticut, Hardly Strictly Bluegrass Festival in San Francisco, California, and String Cheese Incident's Hulaween Festival in Live Oak, Florida. They played two nights in Chicago and two nights in Colorado ending in a New Year's run on December 29, 30, and 31, at the Capitol Theatre, in Port Chester, New York, with the Grateful Dead's own Phil Lesh on bass filling in for Dreiwitz. The JRAD run with Phil Lesh was dubbed "PhilRAD."

JRAD played a total of 10 shows in 2014.

=== 2015 ===
Forty-six shows were listed on the band's website for 2015, including performances at Electric Forest, All Good Music Festival, Mountain Jam and High Sierra Music Festival.

JRAD played a total of 46 shows in 2015.

=== 2016 ===
JRAD had their debut appearance on Jam Cruise in January performing two consecutive nights in the Pantheon Theatre and a Pool Deck set. In July they would play their first show at Red Rocks Amphitheatre in support of Umphrey's McGee. In February 2016, it was announced that Joe Russo's Almost Dead would play a three show run at Brooklyn Bowl for Freak's Ball XVI, from March 24 to March 26. With Ween returning to tour, Dave Dreiwitz missed JRAD's five-night 2016 New England spring tour. Jon Shaw of Shakey Graves and Cass McCombs filled in for Dreiwitz. In August, JRAD played two performances at Lockn' Festival in Virginia, which featured two headline performances by Ween and Phish. Dreiwitz performed in both JRAD and Ween that weekend. Keyboardist Jeff Chimenti filled in for Benevento at two performances in New Orleans in April 2016.

JRAD played a total of 37 shows in 2016.

=== 2017 ===
In 2017 JRAD performed forty shows including their first headlining indoor arena show, their first headlining Red Rocks Amphitheatre show and a return to the Dominican Republic for their second year in a row at Dominican Holidaze. Their first headlining arena show at the 1stBank Center in Broomfield, Colorado was a sold-out show originally scheduled for Red Rocks Amphitheatre but due to a late spring snowstorm, the concert was relocated overnight to the 1stBank Center. The band also performed twelve sold-out nights at the Brooklyn Bowl in New York City during the Spring and Fall of 2017. On March 9, the first night of the spring Brooklyn Bowl run and the band's one-hundredth concert, they premiered Russo and Hamilton's "Keeping it Simple", their first-ever original song. For three of the Brooklyn Bowl performances Oteil Burbridge filled in for Dreiwitz while on Ween tour. On August 31, 2017, the band headlined a sold-out performance at Red Rocks with Oteil Burbridge on bass guitar filling in for Dreiwitz out on Ween tour. In October, between the 5th–7th and the 12th–14th, the band performed the latter six sold-out shows at the Brooklyn Bowl. JRAD's 125th show saw John Mayer, current lead-guitarist of Dead & Company, sitting in on guitar on Friday, October 13 in the first and second set of the show.

JRAD played a total of 40 shows in 2017.

=== 2018 ===
JRAD started off 2018 with three sold-out nights in January at the Capitol Theatre in Port Chester, New York followed by a spring tour beginning on February 15 in Nashville, Tennessee with guest vocalist Nicole Atkins performing 'Doin' That Rag'. Rolling Stone named JRAD's Peach Festival performance "Best Scene-Stealer", saying that, "JRAD takes improvisational jam rock to the nth degree."

JRAD played a total of 39 shows in 2018.

=== 2019 ===
JRAD continued touring in 2019, beginning the year with a three-night January run at the Capitol Theatre in Port Chester, New York. The band played several multi-night runs throughout the year, including shows in St. Louis, Chicago, New Orleans, New Haven, and Brooklyn, along with festival and amphitheater appearances. In August, JRAD performed at the Greek Theatre in Los Angeles, where Stuart Bogie joined the band on flute and saxophone and Eric D. Johnson of Fruit Bats joined on guitar and vocals.

JRAD played a total of 38 shows in 2019.

=== 2020 ===
JRAD performed six shows in 2020 before suspending live performances due to the COVID-19 pandemic. The band's final performance before the shutdown took place on February 23, 2020, at The Capitol Theatre in Port Chester, New York.

=== 2021 ===
After not performing since February 23, 2020, due to the COVID-19 pandemic, JRAD returned to the stage in front of a live audience at a socially-distanced outdoor concert at the Westville Music Bowl in New Haven, Connecticut on May 28, 2021. A stadium built to accommodate 15,000 guests, during the pandemic the capacity of Westville Music Bowl was capped at 2,000 concert-goers per show. That year, JRAD performed nine sold-out socially-distanced concerts at Westville Music Bowl with the final concert culminating on Sept. 4, 2021.

JRAD played a total of 25 shows in 2021.

=== 2022 ===
In 2022, JRAD returned to a broader touring schedule. The band announced dates beginning with three shows in Philadelphia in February, followed by March performances in Madison, Wisconsin, and St. Louis, Missouri. The schedule also included spring and summer appearances in Kentucky, North Carolina, Georgia, Connecticut, and Colorado. During the band's June 2022 Colorado run, JRAD performed at Gerald R. Ford Amphitheater in Vail and Red Rocks Amphitheatre, where the group debuted several covers and was joined by guest musicians including Stuart Bogie.

JRAD played a total of 39 shows in 2022.

=== 2023 ===
In 2023, JRAD marked its 10th anniversary with a return to Brooklyn Bowl on January 26, ten years to the day after the band's first performance at the same venue as part of the Freak's Ball XXI. Bob Weir appeared as a guest during the first set, joining the band for "Jack Straw" and "The Music Never Stopped". The anniversary celebration continued with a three-night run at The Capitol Theatre in Port Chester, New York, from January 27 through 29.

JRAD played a total of 40 shows in 2023.

=== 2024 ===
JRAD kicked off 2024 with their annual three sold-out nights in January at the Capitol Theatre, adding three debut tunes, "Shattered" by The Rolling Stones sung by Dreiwitz, "La Grange" by ZZ Top, and Van Morrison's "Gloria", both sung by Metzger. In March, Russo, Metzger, Hamilton, and Benevento joined Phil Lesh on stage to close out Phil's 84th birthday celebration run at The Capitol Theatre. On June 1, Branford Marsalis joined JRAD at Red Rocks.

JRAD played a total of 36 shows in 2024.

=== 2025 ===
In 2025, JRAD continued touring with additional May dates in Virginia Beach, Asbury Park, and New Haven. In August, the band announced six October tour dates, described as three-night, multi-city runs in the Midwest and California. Later that month, three November shows were added to complete the band's 2025 touring schedule. During an August 2025 performance in Vail, Colorado, Craig Finn of The Hold Steady joined the band for a cover of John Hiatt's "Walk On".

JRAD played a total of 38 shows in 2025.

== Members ==
- Joe Russo – drums, vocals
- Dave Dreiwitz – bass, vocals
- Marco Benevento – keyboards, vocals
- Scott Metzger – guitar, vocals
- Tom Hamilton – guitar, vocals

=== Special guest sit-ins ===
- Craig Finn – vocals (August 21, 2025) in Vail, Colorado
- Warren Haynes – guitar, vocals (January 16, 2026) at The Capitol Theatre in Port Chester, New York
- Branford Marsalis – tenor saxophone, soprano saxophone (August 4, 2023) at Newport Jazz Festival and (June 1, 2024) at Red Rocks Amphitheatre
- Bob Weir – guitar, vocals (January 26, 2023) at Brooklyn Bowl in Brooklyn, New York
- John Mayer – guitar, vocals (October 7, 2016 and October 13, 2017) at Brooklyn Bowl in Brooklyn, New York, and (November 9, 2018) at the Wiltern Theatre in Los Angeles
- Eric D. Johnson – guitar, vocals (August 16, 2019) at the Greek Theatre in Los Angeles
- Jimmy Fallon – vocals (February 23, 2020) at The Capitol Theatre in Port Chester, New York
- Chris Harford – vocals, guitar (February 23, 2020) at The Capitol Theatre in Port Chester, New York, and (May 28, 2021) at Westville Music Bowl in New Haven, Connecticut
- Jim James – vocals (August 25, 2017) at Lockn' Festival
- Nicole Atkins – vocals (January 12, 2017) at the Ryman Auditorium and (February 15, 2018) in Nashville, Tennessee

=== Live substitutes ===
- Phil Lesh – bass (December 30 and 31, 2014)
- Jon Shaw – bass, vocals (spring 2016 tour; June 3, 2017; April 29 and 30, 2022 at Rabbit Rabbit in Asheville, North Carolina; May 1, 2022 at SweetWater 420 Fest; and August 4, 2023 at Newport Jazz Festival)
- Jeff Chimenti – keyboards, vocals (April 2016, two shows)
- Oteil Burbridge – bass, vocals (March 2017, three shows; August 31, 2017 at Red Rocks Amphitheatre; and October 20, 2018 at The Anthem)
- Evan Roque – drums (July 27 and 28, 2019)
- Ben Perowsky – drums (July 27 and 28, 2019)
- Eric Slick – drums (July 28, 2019)
- John Morgan Kimock – drums (July 28, 2019)
