= List of jam bands =

The following is a list of jam bands, or bands on the jam-band circuit. Jam band performances often feature extended musical improvisation ("jams") over rhythmic grooves and chord patterns, and long sets of music that cross genre boundaries.

== Jam bands ==
=== 0–9 ===
- 7 Walkers

=== A ===
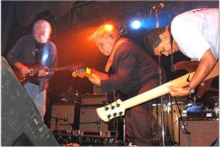
Col. Bruce Hampton and The Aquarium Rescue Unit, October 2004

- Acoustic Syndicate
- Al and The Transamericans
- Allman Brothers Band
- Amfibian
- Animal Liberation Orchestra
- Aquarium Rescue Unit
- Assembly of Dust
- Ataxia

=== B ===
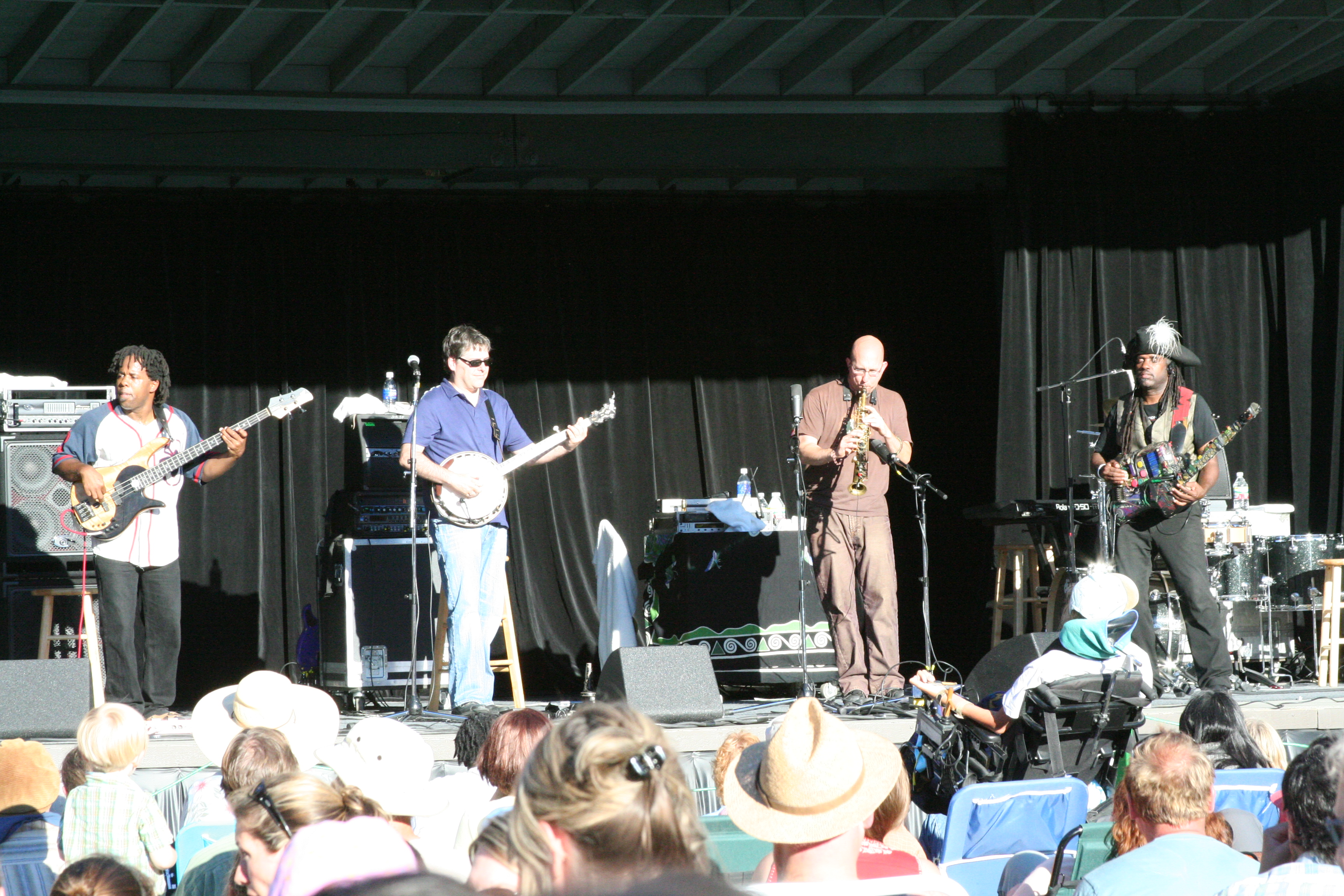
Béla Fleck and the Flecktones, Woodland Park Zoo, Seattle, Washington, August 1, 2007

- Back Door Slam
- BadBadNotGood
- Band of Gypsys
- Banyan
- Barefoot Truth
- Béla Fleck and the Flecktones
- Benevento/Russo Duo
- Bernie Worrell & the Woo Warriors
- Big Something
- Billy Strings
- Big Head Todd and the Monsters
- Billy and the Kids
- The Big Wu
- BK3
- The Black Crowes
- Blackberry Smoke
- Blues Project
- Blues Traveler
- Bobby and the Midnites
- The Bomb Squad
- BoomBox
- The Brakes
- The Brew
- The Bridge
- The Bright Light Social Hour
- Buckethead
- Brothers Past

=== C ===
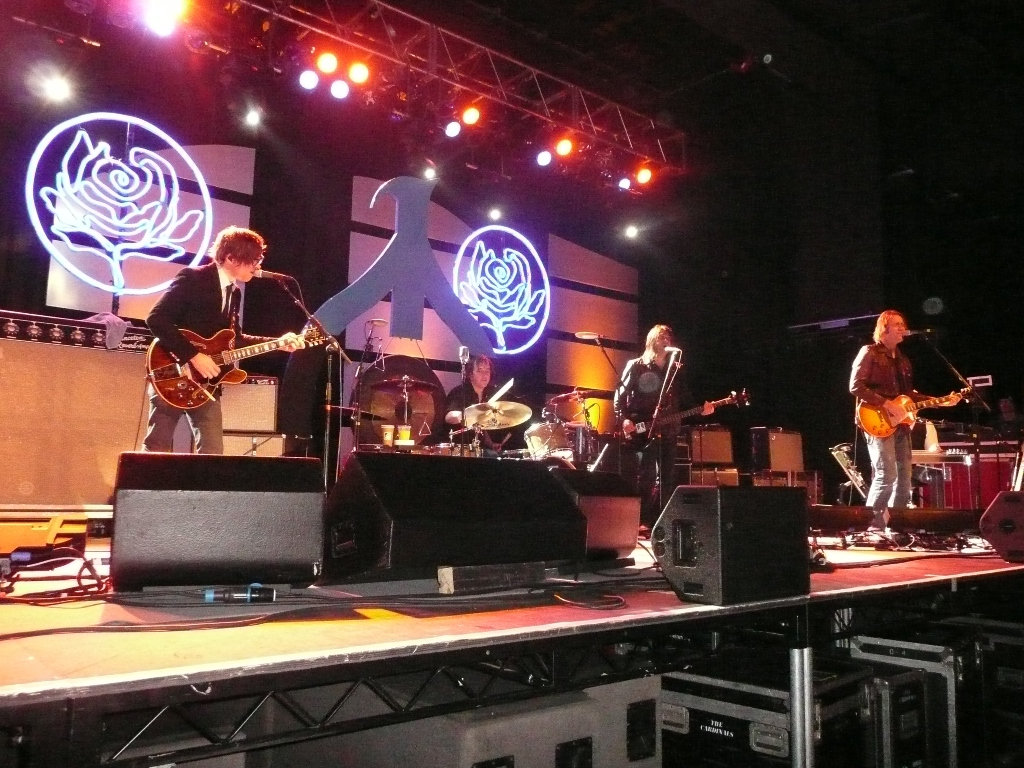
The Cardinals, live at the Manchester Academy, England, November 2008

- The Cardinals
- Carl Broemel
- Caravan
- Causa Sui
- CBDB
- Centipede
- Chris Robinson Brotherhood
- The Codetalkers
- Colonel Claypool's Bucket of Bernie Brains
- Colonel Les Claypool's Fearless Flying Frog Brigade
- Consider the Source
- Country Joe and the Fish

=== D ===
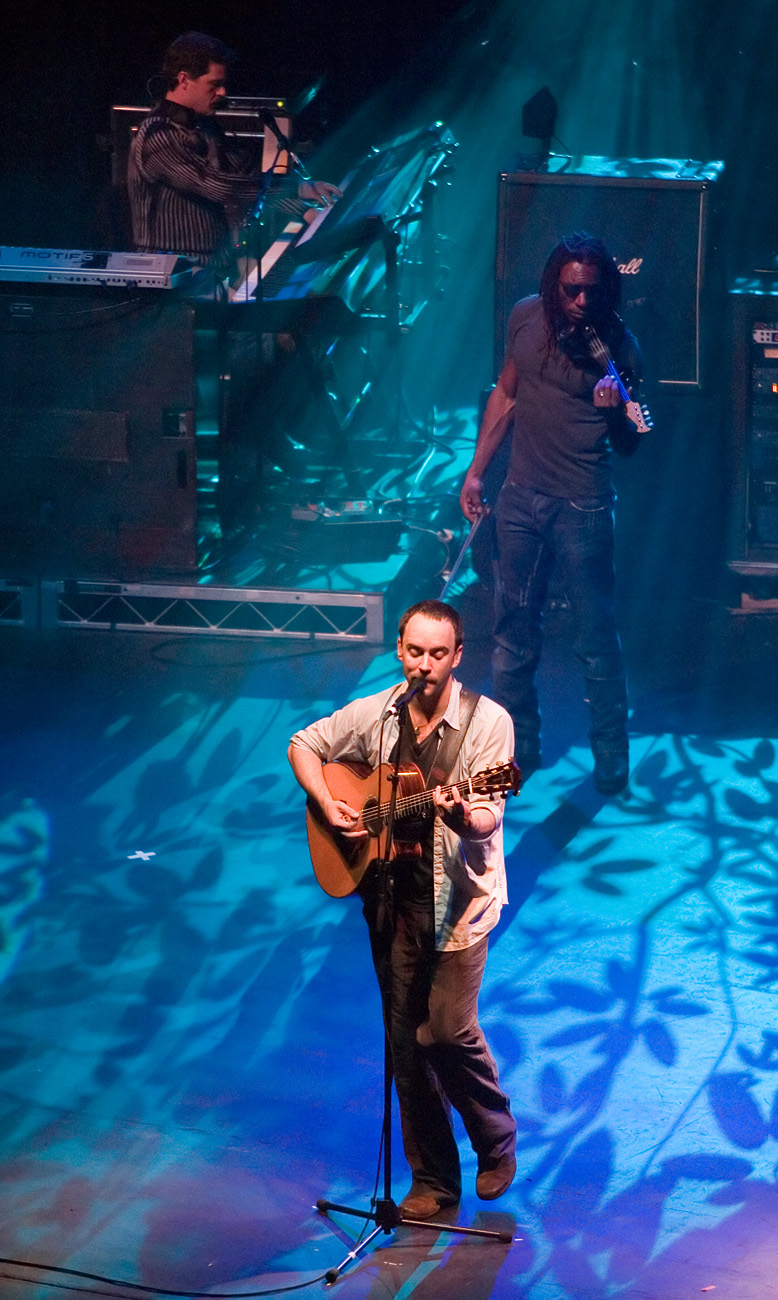
Dave Matthews Band: Dave Matthews, Boyd Tinsley, and Butch Taylor in Melbourne during their first tour of Australia

- Dangermuffin
- Dark Star Orchestra
- Dave Matthews Band
- David Nelson Band
- The Dead
- Dead & Company
- Deep Banana Blackout
- Derek and the Dominos
- Derek Trucks Band
- The Dirty Dozen Brass Band
- The Disco Biscuits
- Dispatch
- Donavon Frankenreiter
- Donna Jean Godchaux Band
- Dopapod
- DJ Logic
- Donna the Buffalo
- Dr. Dan Matrazzo and the Looters
- The Doobie Brothers

=== E ===
- The Egg
- Ekoostik hookah
- El Michels Affair
- Electric Apricot
- The Electric Co.
- EOTO
- The Expendables

=== F ===
- Fat Freddy's Drop
- Freddy Jones Band
- Fungus Amungus
- Furthur
- Future Rock

=== G ===
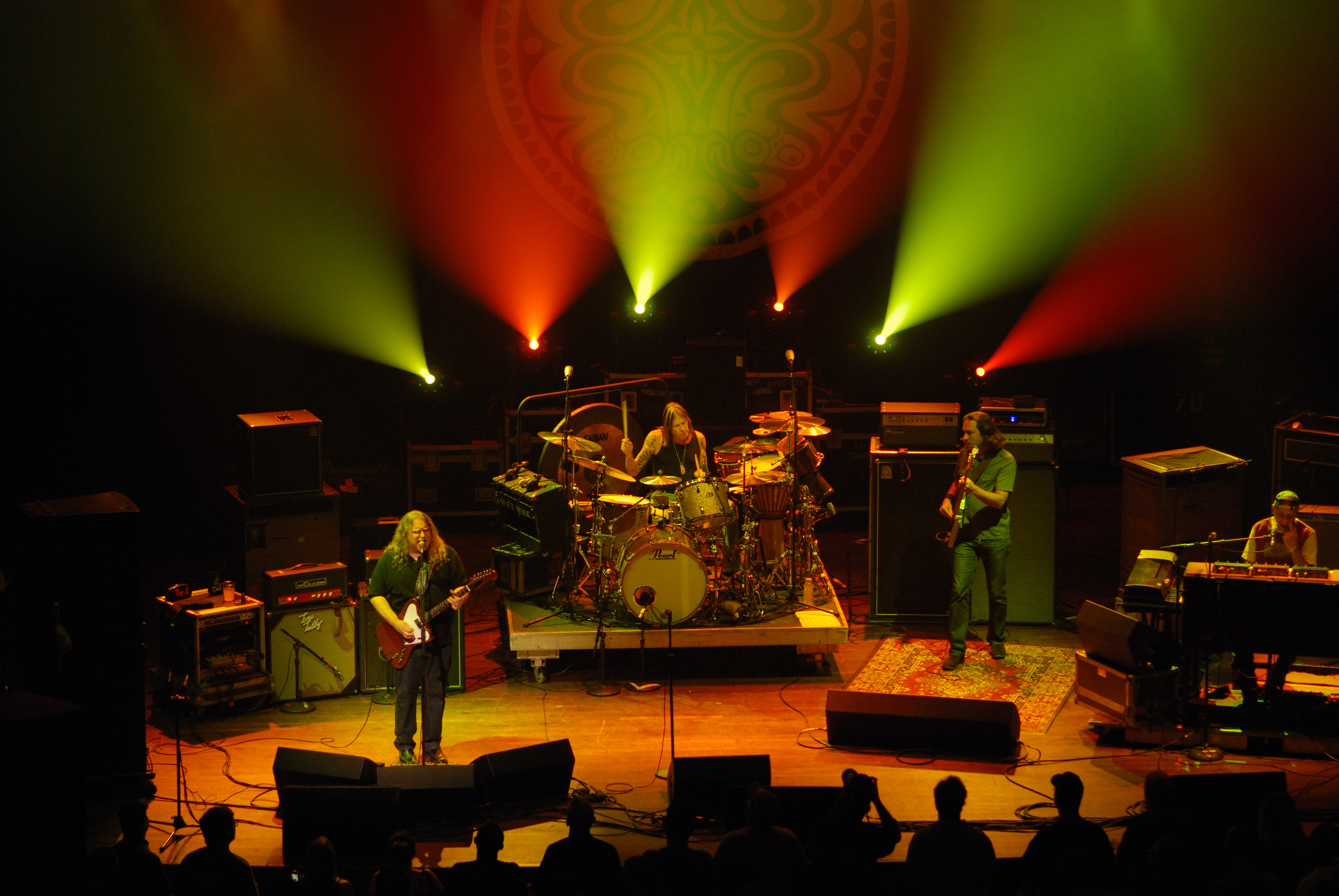
Gov't Mule performing in 2008

- G. Love & Special Sauce
- G-Nome Project
- Gabe Dixon Band
- Galactic
- Garage A Trois
- Garaj Mahal
- Ghosts of Jupiter
- Ghost Light
- Giant Panda Guerilla Dub Squad
- Glass Harp
- God Street Wine
- Gong
- Goose
- Gov't Mule
- Grateful Dead
- Grace Potter and the Nocturnals
- The Grapes
- Greensky Bluegrass
- Guerilla Toss

=== H ===
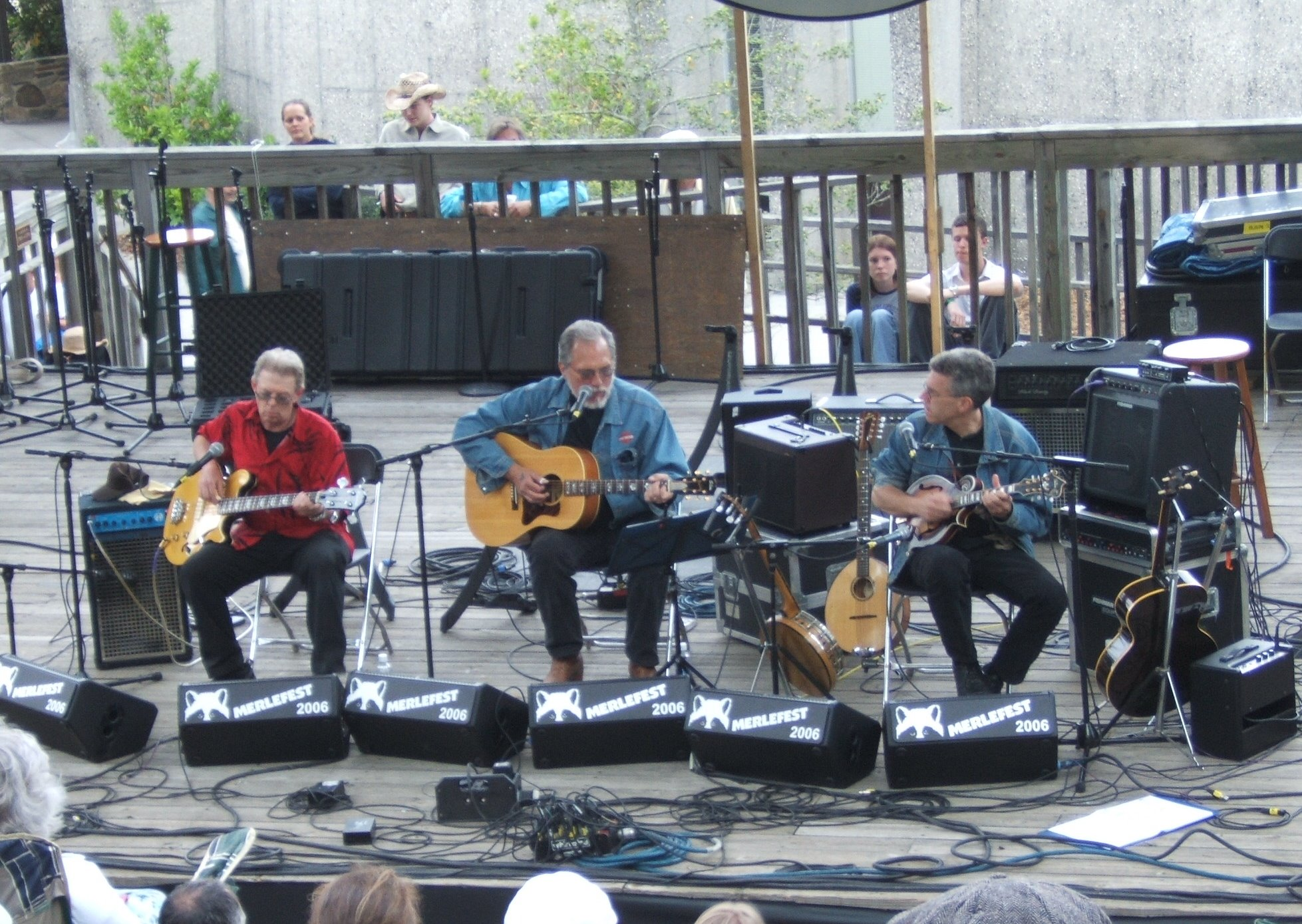
Hot Tuna at MerleFest, 2006. Left to right, Jack Casady, Jorma Kaukonen and Barry Mitterhoff

- Heart of Gold Band
- The Heavy Pets
- Hootie & the Blowfish
- Hot Buttered Rum
- Hot Tuna
- Hypnotic Clambake

=== I ===
- Infamous Stringdusters
- Ivan Neville's Dumpstaphunk

=== J ===
- Jack Johnson
- Jacob Fred Jazz Odyssey
- Jam Camp
- Jazz Is Dead
- Jazz Mandolin Project
- Jefferson Airplane
- Jerry Garcia Acoustic Band
- Jerry Garcia Band
- JGB
- The Jimi Hendrix Experience
- The Jimmy Swift Band
- Joe Russo's Almost Dead
- John Brown's Body
- The John Butler Trio
- Jupiter Coyote

=== K ===
- King Gizzard & the Lizard Wizard
- Karl Denson's Tiny Universe
- Keller Williams
- Khruangbin
- Kingfish
- Kikagaku Moyo
- Kudzu Kings
- KVHW

=== L ===
- Lake Trout
- Leaf Hound
- Leftover Salmon
- Legion of Mary
- Les Claypool
- Lettuce
- Little Barrie
- Little Feat
- Liquid Soul
- Lotus

=== M ===
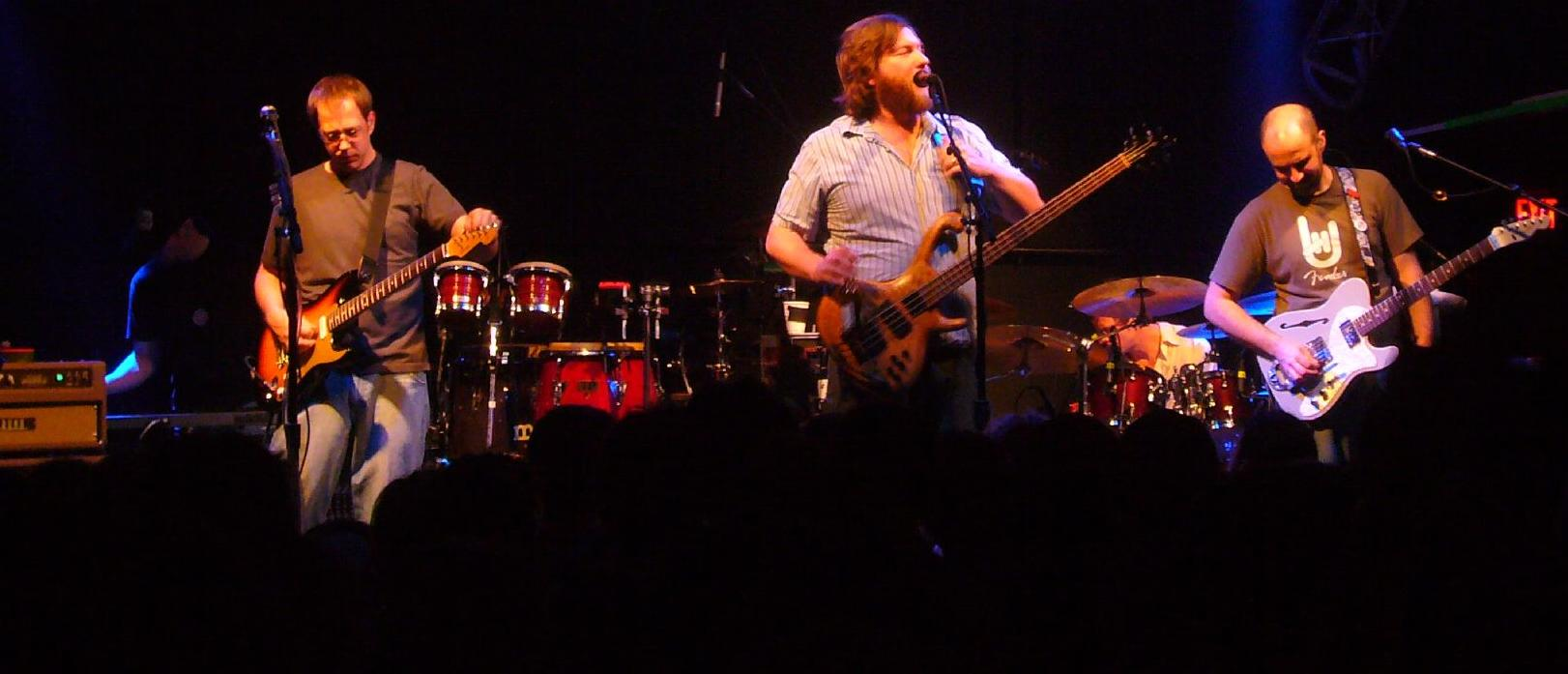
moe. tuning their instruments between songs on March 3, 2007

- Maktub
- Man
- The Marshall Tucker Band
- Matisyahu
- Matt Schofield
- Max Creek
- The McLovins
- Medeski Martin & Wood
- Medeski Scofield Martin & Wood
- Michael Franti & Spearhead
- Mickey Hart
- Mike Gordon
- moe.
- Mofro
- Molly Hatchet
- Moshav
- The Motet
- The Mother Hips
- Moon Taxi
- Mr. Blotto
- My Morning Jacket

=== N ===
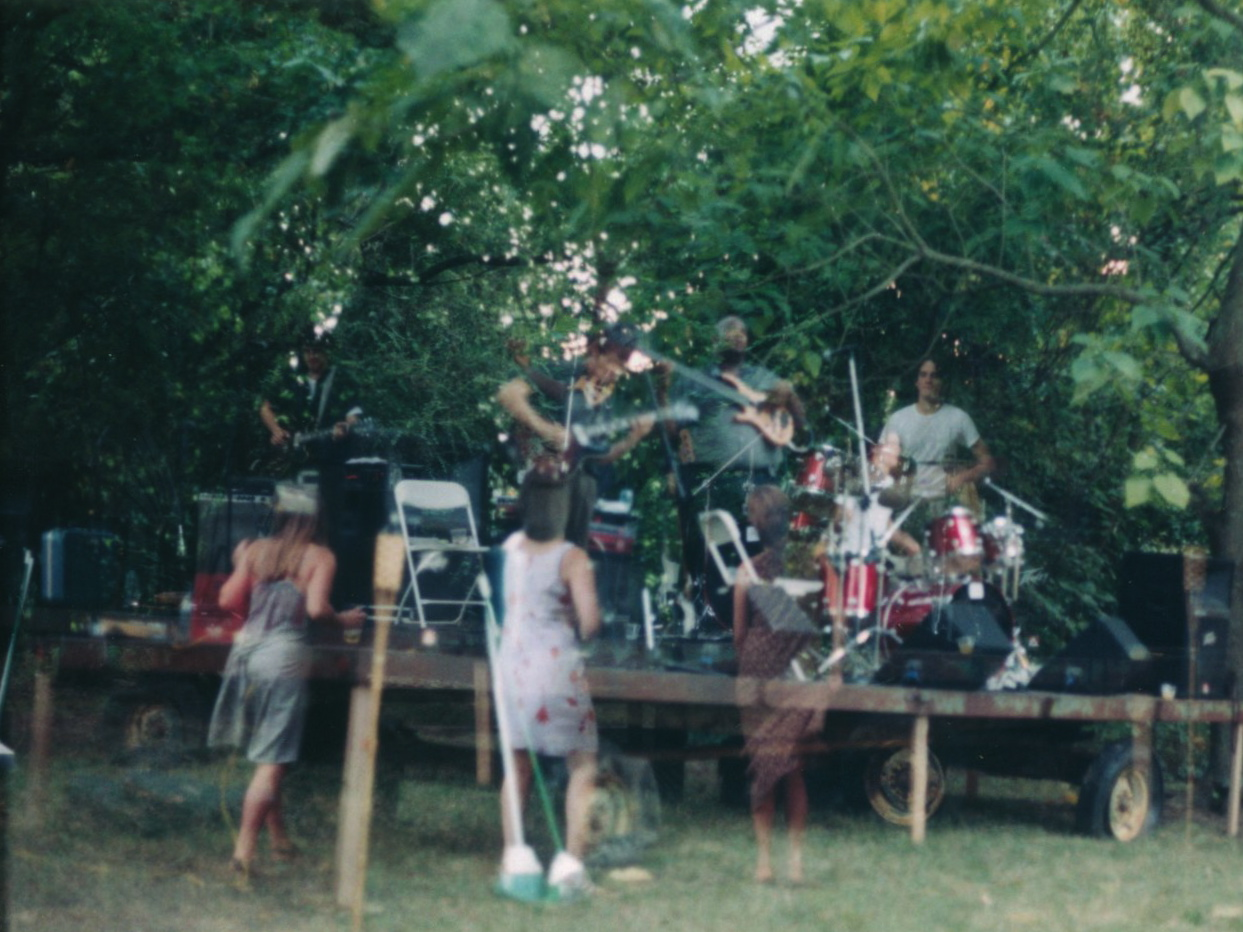
The North Mississippi Allstars in a wedding reception performance in Gunnison, Mississippi, 1999

- New Deal
- New Grass Revival
- The New Mastersounds
- New Riders of the Purple Sage
- New Monsoon
- Nickel Creek
- North Mississippi All-Stars
- The New Mastersounds

=== O ===
- Old & In the Way
- Oteil Burbridge
- The Other Ones
- Oysterhead
- Ozric Tentacles
- O.A.R.

=== P ===
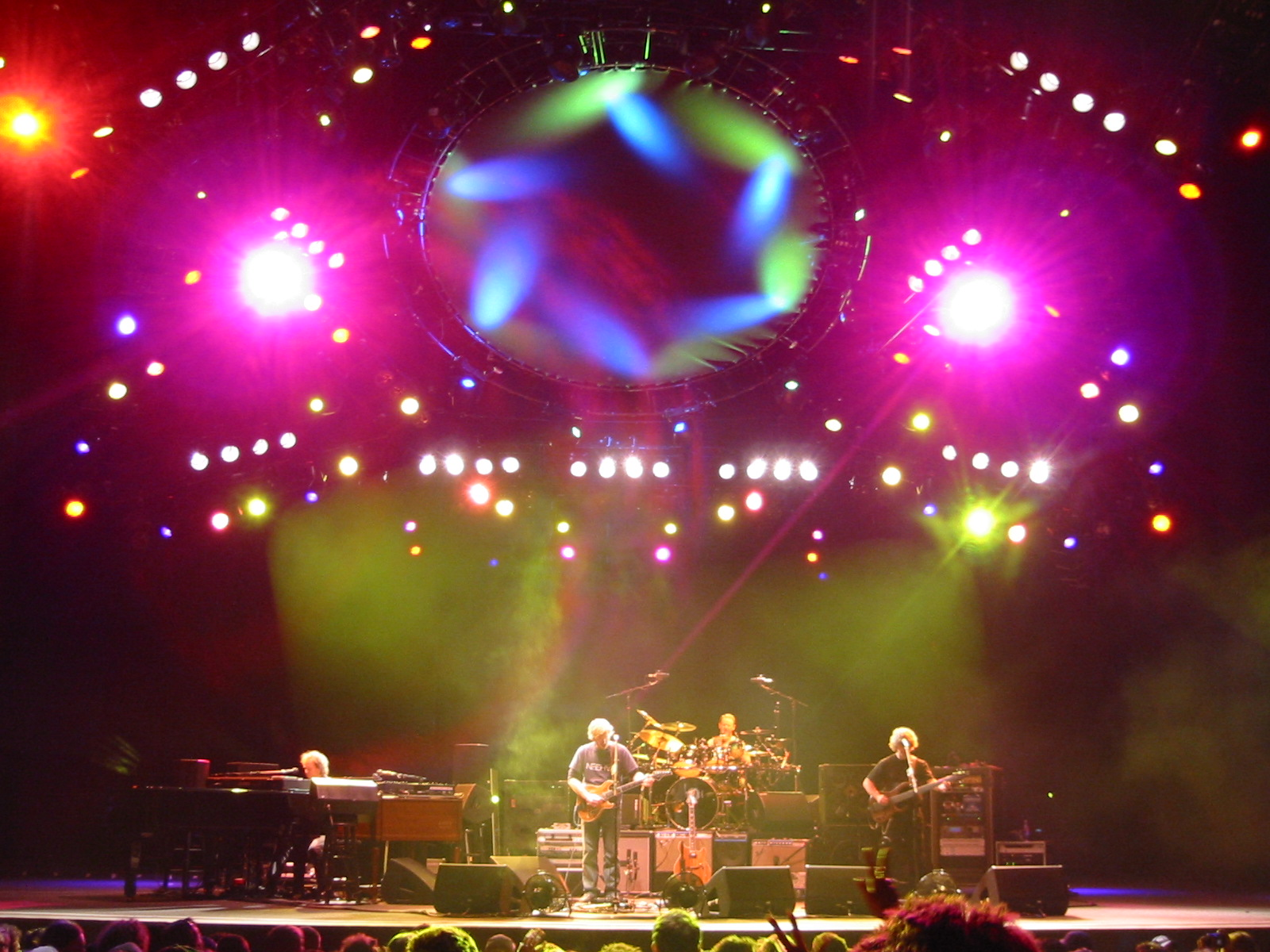
Phish

- Particle
- Pat McGee Band
- Paul Butterfield Blues Band
- Perpetual Groove
- Phil Lesh and Friends
- Phish
- Pigeons Playing Ping Pong
- Polyphonic Spree
- Pnuma Trio
- Pseudopod

=== Q ===
- The Quark Alliance
- Quicksilver Messenger Service

=== R ===
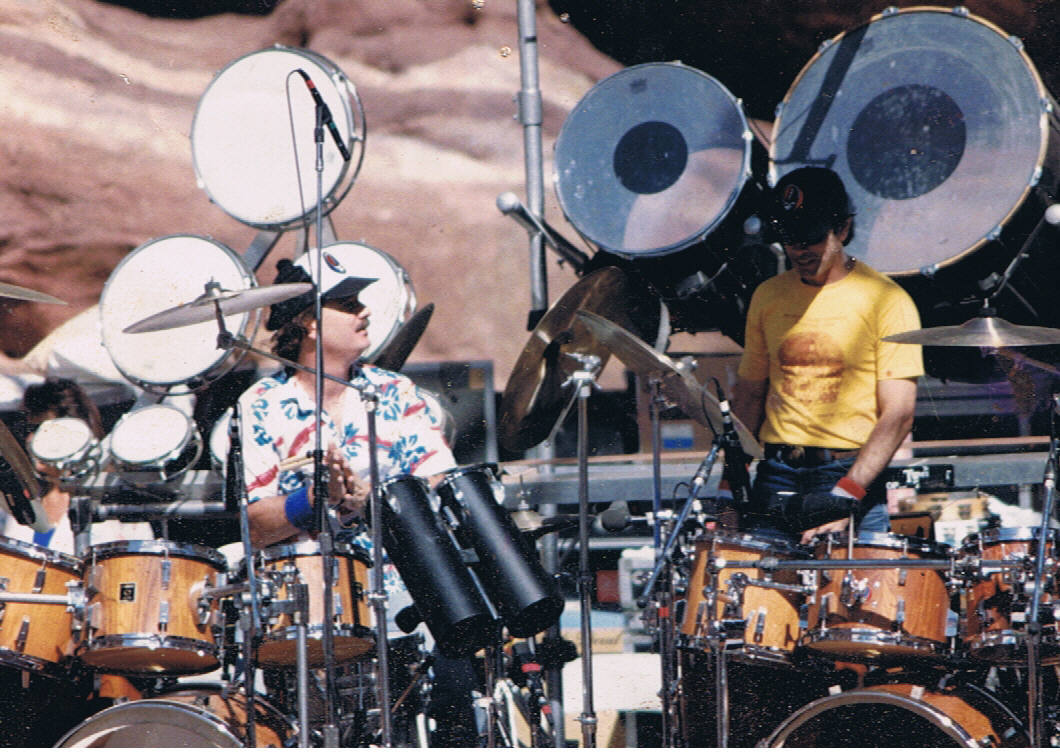
Grateful Dead drummers Bill Kreutzmann and Mickey Hart, of the Rhythm Devils

- The Radiators
- Railroad Earth
- RAQ
- Ratdog
- Reconstruction
- Return to Forever
- Rhythm Devils
- Robert Randolph and the Family Band
- Rodrigo Y Gabriela
- Roster McCabe
- Rubber Souldiers
- Rusted Root
- RX Bandits

=== S ===
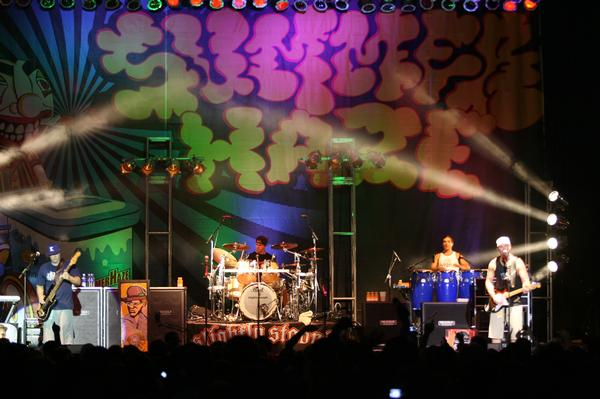
Slightly Stoopid, Summer Haze 2007 tour

- Santana
- The Samples
- Schleigho
- SerialPod
- Sister Hazel
- Slightly Stoopid
- The Slip
- Soulhat
- Soulfarm
- Soulive
- Soul Rebels Brass Band
- Sound Tribe Sector 9
- Spafford
- Spyro Gyra
- The Spin Doctors
- State Radio
- Steve Kimock Band
- Stockholm Syndrome
- Strangefolk
- The String Cheese Incident
- Sublime

=== T ===
- Tauk
- Tea Leaf Green
- Tedeschi Trucks Band
- Ten Ton Chicken
- Ten Years After
- Traffic
- Trampled By Turtles
- Trey Anastasio Band
- Trigon
- Twiddle
- Traveling Wilburys

=== U ===
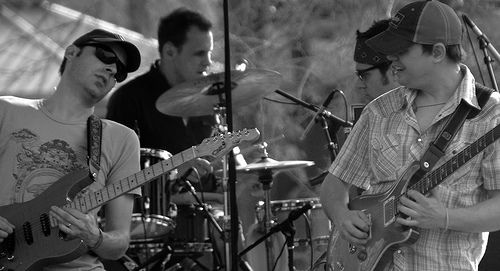
Umphrey's McGee in April 2007

- Umoja Orchestra
- Umphrey's McGee

=== V ===
- Vetiver
- Vida Blue
- Vulfpeck

=== W ===
- The Waybacks
- The Werks
- Widespread Panic
- Cory Wong
- The Word
- Ween

=== X ===
- Xavier Rudd

=== Y ===
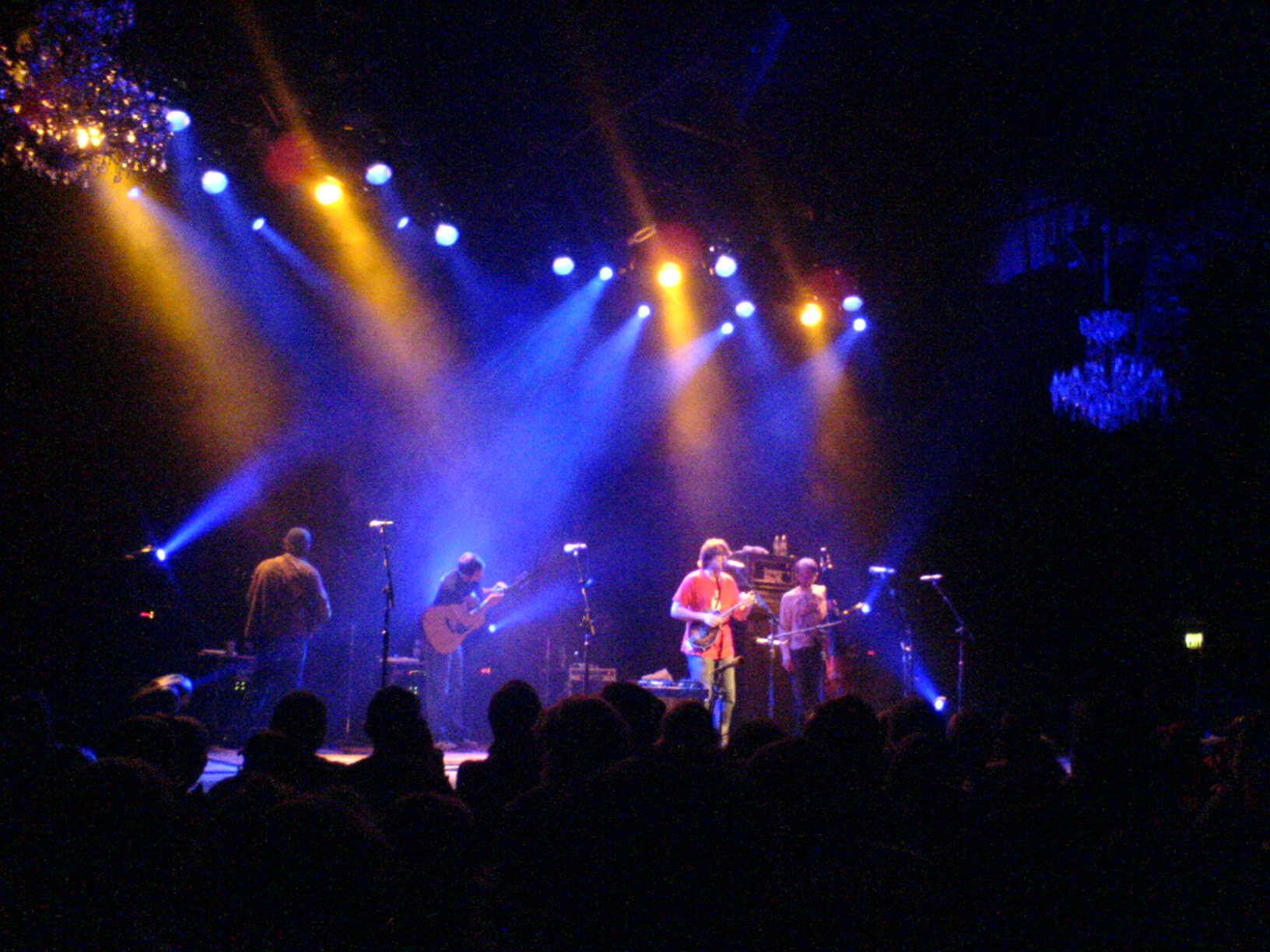
Yonder Mountain String Band, April 21, 2007, The Fillmore, San Francisco

- Yonder Mountain String Band

=== Z ===
- Zac Brown Band
- Zach Gill
- Zero
- Zilla
- ZOX

== See also ==
- Lists of musicians
- List of guitars
