= 10,000 Lakes Festival =

Music festival in Minnesota, U.S.

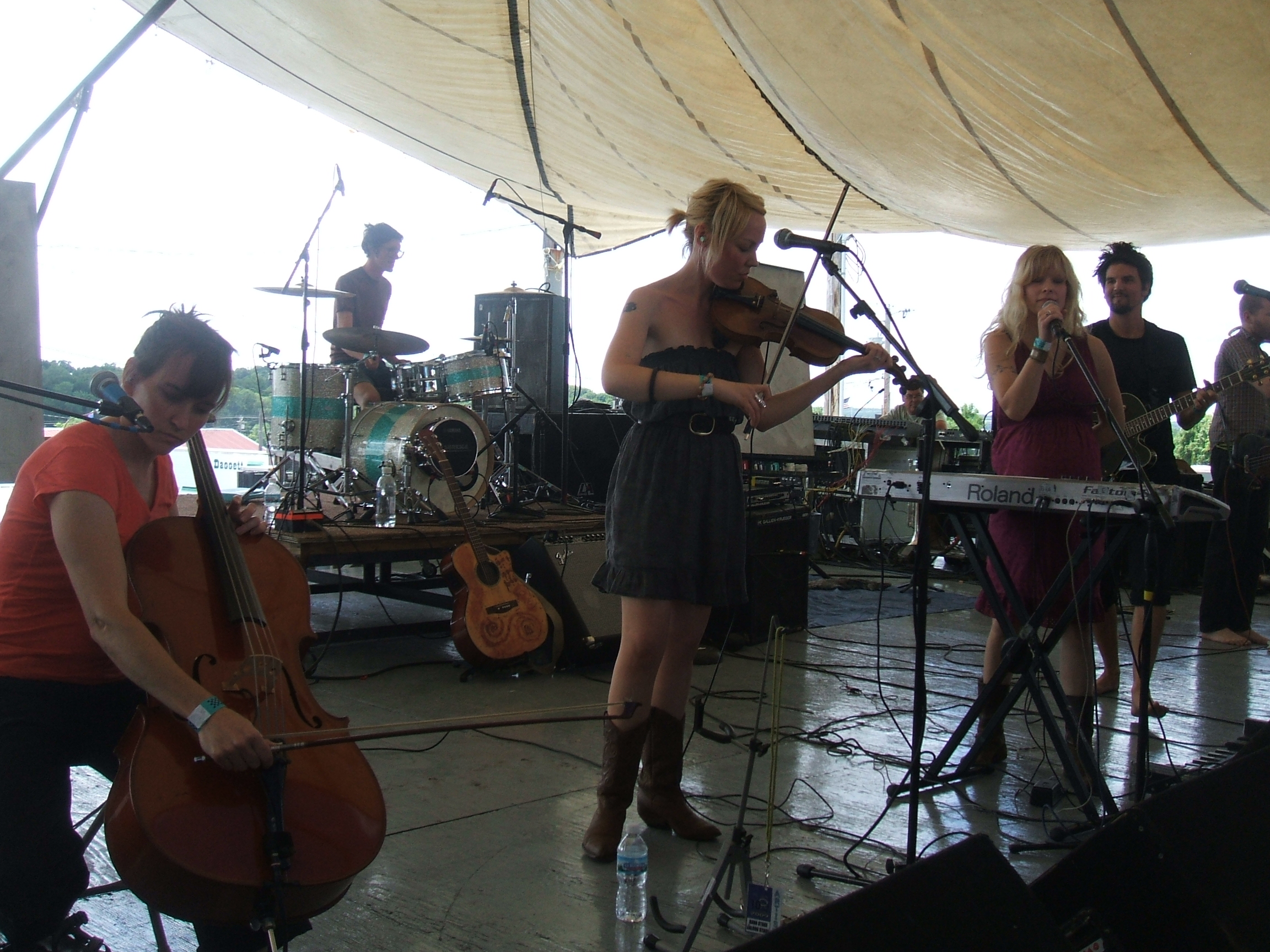
- CloudCult performance at the 10,000 Lakes Festival
- Genre: Bluegrass music, jam band music
- Locations: Detroit Lakes, Minnesota
- Years active: 2003-2009
- Website: http://www.10klf.com

The 10,000 Lakes Festival (abbreviated as 10KLF) was an annual four-day music festival in Detroit Lakes, Minnesota, at the Soo Pass Ranch that was held from 2003 until 2009 before going on indefinite hiatus due to financial losses and has not been held since 2010. Its name refers to Minnesota's nickname, "The Land of 10,000 Lakes". The lineups generally include jam and bluegrass bands.

The festival was held on over 600 acres (243 ha) and had four stages: Main, Field, Barn, and Saloon. (The stages are listed by size, beginning with the largest.) Campgrounds were able to be reserved and running water provided permanent restrooms and showers. In 2006, over 18,000 people attended.

== Stages ==
- Main Stage - Headliners perform here. This stage accommodates the most room for listeners.
- Field Stage - As its name suggests, the Field Stage is located in front of a field, allowing room for acts that attract large crowds.
- Barn Stage - This stage is located at the base of a hill and features a translucent canopy for shade.
- Saloon Stage - Acts that attract the smallest crowds are booked in a saloon, which stays open later than all other stages.

== 10,000 Lakes Festivals by year ==
10,000 Lakes Festivals by year
Year	Dates held	Acts
2003	July 1-4	Widespread Panic, Allman Brothers Band, Gov't Mule, moe., Galactic, Leftover Salmon, O.A.R., Leo Kottke, The Big Wu, Particle, Jerry Joseph and the Jackmormons, Donna The Buffalo, Wookiefoot, Topaz, Echo, Big Tasty, Kung Fu Hippies, The Lost Trailers, Sojorn, Front Porch Swingin' Liquor Pigs, Jim Bianco, Tim Sparks, McCloskey Brothers Band, Foggy Bottom Band, Jack Brass Band.
2004	July 1-4	The String Cheese Incident, 311, The Roots, Galactic, Medeski Martin & Wood, Keller Williams, John Mayer, Los Lobos, Yonder Mountain String Band, Stockholm Syndrome, North Mississippi Allstars, Jazz Mandolin Project, Dirty Dozen Brass Band, Cyril Neville, Rob Wasserman, DJ Logic, Soulive, Cyro Baptista, The Radiators, The Samples, The Big Wu, Aranka Fabian, Particle, Buckwheat Zydeco, Dread Zeppelin, The Greyhounds, Maroon 5, Xavier Rudd, New Monsoon, Donavon Frankenreiter, The JiMiller Band, The Lost Trailers, Wookiefoot, Hooch
2005	July 21-24	Widespread Panic, Trey Anastasio, The Black Crowes, Les Claypool, G. Love & Special Sauce, Rusted Root, Dark Star Orchestra, Buckethead with Brain, Particle, Everyone Orchestra with Steve Kimock, Sound Tribe Sector 9, Jazz Mandolin Project, MOFRO, Cyro Baptista, Perpetual Groove, Jacob Fred Jazz Odyssey, Bockman, Green Lemon, Delta Nove, ALO, Bump, The Breakfast, Trampled by Turtles, Fat Maw Rooney, Mr. Blotto, Signal Path, God Johnson, Grace Potter & The Nocturnals, Freshwater Collins, New Primitives, Hooch, Gabby La La, White Iron Band, Turbine, Down Lo, Smokin Bandits, 56 Hope Road, T.U.G.G., Madahoochi, Holy Moses & The High Rollers, Roadside Zoo, Covert Operations
2006	July 19-22	Phil Lesh & Friends, Trey Anastasio, The String Cheese Incident, Benevento/Russo Duo featuring Mike Gordon, The Keller Williams Incident, O.A.R., Umphrey's McGee, Big Head Todd & The Monsters, Keller Williams, Medeski Martin & Wood, Steve Kimock & Steve Perkins, Railroad Earth, The Everyone Orchestra, Shooter Jennings, Garaj Mahal, The Big Wu, Great American Taxi featuring Vince Herman, The Mutaytor, Hot Buttered Rum, Assembly of Dust, Tea Leaf Green, The Wood Brothers, RAQ, Papa Mali, Jacob Fred Jazz Odyssey, The Breakfast, Green Lemon, Trampled by Turtles, Fat Maw Rooney, Backyard Tire Fire, God Johnson, Freshwater Collins, Tim Sparks, White Iron Band, Hooch, Down Lo, New Primitives, Unity, Moses Mayes, GypsyFoot, Stellar Road, U-Melt, Family Groove Company, Madahoochi, Cornmeal, Stealin' Strings, Gold Standard, Jazzwholes, Public Property, Hyentyte, Cool Waters Band, WBPN, Soap, Kinetix, Hobo Nephews
2007	July 18-21	Bob Weir and RatDog, The String Cheese Incident, Umphrey's McGee, moe., Gov't Mule, Zappa Plays Zappa, Tragically Hip, Keller Williams, The Derek Trucks Band, The Disco Biscuits, Galactic, Little Feat, Particle, NRPS, Blueground Undergrass, Ivan Neville's Dumpstaphunk, Jon Cleary and the AMG, The Lee Boys, Trampled by Turtles, Outformation, Toubab Krewe, That 1 Guy, Everyone Orchestra, Pnuma Trio, Dubconscious, Kaki King, WookieFoot, God Johnson, Cornmeal, Green Lemon, Moses Mayes, Big Organ Trio, The Frequency, White Iron Band, New Primitives, Down Lo / Deploi, Kinetix, Family Groove Company, Bump, Mr. Blotto, Madahoochi, Stealin' Strings, Unity, Smokin' Bandits, GypsyFoot, WBPN, Cosmic Railroad, Shoeless Revolution, Hyentyte
2008	July 23-26	Phil Lesh and Friends, The Flaming Lips, Michael Franti and Spearhead, Mickey Hart Band featuring Steve Kimock and George Porter Jr., Leftover Salmon, George Clinton and the Parliament-Funkadelic, Medeski Martin & Wood with special guest John Scofield, Slightly Stoopid, Dark Star Orchestra, WookieFoot, TR3 featuring Tim Reynolds, The Bad Plus, JJ Grey & MOFRO, Deep Banana Blackout, Lotus, Teddy Presberg, Bonerama, Papa Mali, Extra Golden, EOTO, Panjea with Michael Kang, The Waybacks, Everyone Orchestra, Secret Chiefs 3, The New Mastersounds, The Wood Brothers, Dub Trio, Cornmeal, Kelly Richey Band, Family Groove Company, U-Melt, One Under, God Johnson, Phix, Kinetix, New Primitives, White Iron Band, Moon Taxi, Lynx, Redux, WBPN, Pert Near Sandstone, Heatbox, Ultraviolet Hippopotamus, The Hue, GypsyFoot, Gold Standard, Enchanted Ape, The Limns, Rhinestone Diplomats, The Histronic, Solution, Sovereign Sect, Blue Martian Tribe, Dead Larry, Roster McCabe, Comosapiens, Bill Smith, The Twin Cats, Dred I Dread, Jpetty (All Good Things), The Stretch, Springdale Quartet
2009	July 22-25	

== See also ==
- List of bluegrass music festivals
- List of jam band music festivals
