= Giant Panda Guerilla Dub Squad =

American reggae and jam band

- Origin: Rochester, New York, United States
- Genres: Reggae; roots reggae; Americana; dub; folk
- Years active: 2001–present
- Labels: Rootfire Cooperative; Easy Star Records; Controlled Substance Sound Labs
- Members: Chris O'Brian; James Searl; Dylan Savage; Tony Gallicchio; Lucius Snowden
- Past members: Matthew O'Brian; Rachel Orke; Aaron Lipp; Dan Keller; Eli Flynn; Matt Goodwin
- Website: livepanda.com

Giant Panda Guerilla Dub Squad is an American reggae and jam band from Rochester, New York, founded in 2001 and known for their live performances and authentic roots reggae and dub sound.

== History ==
=== Formation (2001) ===
Giant Panda Guerilla Dub Squad was formed in 2001 when brothers Chris O'Brian on drums and Matt O'Brian on guitar teamed up with their childhood friend, James Searl on vocals and bass. They started playing shows in their hometown of Rochester, New York and then moved to Ithaca, New York. The band based their name on the fictional "Giant Panda Gypsy Blues Band" from Another Roadside Attraction by Tom Robbins.

GPGDS' electric mix of roots, reggae, and dub music that combines world beats and reggae rhythm with jam band aesthetics. They are committed to "connecting people with the great music; roots and dub for your mediation." The band have been noted for their live shows, which are often recorded by concert tapers and posted on Etree and the Internet Archive.

=== Slow Down (2006) ===
In 2004, GPGDS solidified their sound and line up, including; Dylan Savage: guitar/vocals, Grant "Skribe Da God" Atkins: percussion/vocals, Rachel Orke: keys, & Aaron Lipp: keys/vocals

The band's debut album Slow Down was released in 2006 and received regular airplay on Sirius and XM Radio. The album was recorded at Pyramid Sound Studios in Ithaca, New York, and produced by the band and Alex Perialas.

Soon after, they recorded a live acoustic session at Moboogie Loft in Denver, Colorado.

=== Touring and Live Up! albums (2008–2011) ===
On May 30, 2008, the band played at Warren Haynes' Mountain Jam Festival at Hunter Mountain Ski Resort in upstate New York.

In 2009, the band released a live recordings album titled, Live Up!. The album features 11 tracks that were recorded during their 2008 and 2009 national tours.

Founding member Matt O'Brian and keyboard player Rachel Orke left the band in 2010.

The band also released Live Up!! Volume II on September 2, 2010, featuring 10 live recordings from the band's Southeast USA tour. They also played at the 2010 All Good Music Festival gaining further notoriety in the jam band circuit.

In 2011, the band added guitarist Dan Keller from North Tonawanda, New York on lead guitar, rhythm guitar, vocals, and harmony.

On July 23, 2011 the band played the Gathering of The Vibes music festival in Bridgeport, Connecticut. They also returned to the All Good Music Festival for the second consecutive year.

=== Country and In These Times (2012) ===
The band released their second studio album, Country on January 31, 2012, on the California-based record label Controlled Substance Sound Labs. With this release, the quintet has charted new territory and put together a lyrically driven roots Americana-music and folk album.

On April 10, 2012, the band released their third studio album, (a full electric album), In These Times, also on the Controlled Substance Sound Labs label. The 'psychedelic roots' sound is more familiar to fans who were familiar with the band through concerts and live recordings. The album peaked at #5 on the Billboard Reggae Albums Chart.

The band's music was featured on NPR's radio program All Things Considered on January 28, 2012.

=== Steady (2013) ===
Keyboardist Tony Gallicchio, another Rochester local, joined the band in place of departing keyboard player Aaron Lipp.

In 2013, the band recorded their fourth album, Steady which was co-produced by Craig Welsch of 10 Foot Ganja Plant. Steady hit #1 on the Billboard Reggae Album chart on October 9, 2014.

=== Bright Days (2015) ===
In 2015, the band released their fifth album (and second 'Americana' album), Bright Days on Easy Star Records. It features nine original songs recorded at the Rear Window Studio in Brookline, Massachusetts.

=== Make It Better (2016) ===
On September 16, 2016, the band released their sixth album called, Make It Better on Rootfire Cooperative, featuring ten new tracks. The album was recorded in their hometown of Rochester, New York at Blackdog Studios owned by former band member Matt Goodwin. The band also prepared some tracks at Scanhope Sound in Littleton, Colorado. This album was mixed by Danny Kalb who also co-produced. Make it Better debuted at the #1 spot on Billboard and the iTunes reggae charts.

=== Love In Time (2023) ===
On April 7, 2023, the band released their seventh album called, Love In Time on Easy Star Records, featuring eleven new tracks.

=== Singles and dub version songs (2019–present) ===
The band released the singles, "Good Love", "Cool It", "Stop Fighting" in 2019. The same year, in February, guitarist Dan Keller played his last show with the band. GPGDS then added guitarist Eli Flynn from upstate New York band Upward Groove that spring.

GPGDS then released dub versions of their previous songs in 2020, featuring Victor Rice, Pachyman, and Agent Jay.

In 2021, the band released more singles during the spring and summer titled, "Solidarity" with Kevin Kinsella (on April 2), "Really True (The Scientist Dub)", (on May 21) "Hold You Tonight" (on July 2) and "Narita" (on August 20). They also continued touring in the U.S. in the summer and fall on the east coast.

== Musical style and influences ==
The band has many different musical influences. Some of them include: Phish, Sublime, John Brown's Body, The Wailers, Bunny Wailer, Burning Spear, Lee Scratch Perry, Bob Marley, and The Grateful Dead.

== Musical collaborations ==
Giant Panda Guerilla Dub Squad has collaborated with many different artists on stage and in the studio. Their album Bright Days includes "Humboldt County Gold" featuring G. Love on harmonic.

On the 2014 release Steady, the band collaborated with reggae legend Ranking Joe on the track "Take Your Place."

Elliot Martin from John Brown's Body contributed vocals on the track "Really True" on the band's 2017 release Make It Better.

Italian-American musicologist Dougie "Roast Beef" Ducker, best known as "the man who brought Reggae to Biloxi", has covered several of the band's songs live, and dedicated a reggae-tinged cover of P.O.D's "Alive" to his so-called "Panda Bros".

== Lineup ==
=== Current members ===
- Chris O'Brian – Drums, Vocals (2001–Present)
- James Searl – Bass, Vocals (2001–Present)
- Dylan Savage – Guitar, Vocals (2006–Present)
- Tony Gallicchio – Keyboard (2013–Present)
- Eli Flynn – Guitar, Vocals (2019–Present)
- Lucius Snowden - Keyboard (2021-Present)

=== Past members ===
- Matthew O'Brian – Guitar, Vocals (2001–2010)
- Aaron Lipp – Keyboard, Percussion, Vocals (2006–2013)
- Rachel Orke – Keyboard (2006–2010)
- Dan Keller – Lead Guitar, Piano, Vocals (2011–2019)
- Matt Goodwin – Keyboard, Organ, Production (2013–2014)
- Grant "Skribe Da God" Atkins - Percussion, Vocals (2004-2007)

== Discography ==
=== Studio albums ===
Chart History
Year	Album	Label	Billboard peak
2006	Slow Down	Self-produced	—
2012	Country	Herbivore Records	—
2012	In These Times	Controlled Substance Sound Labs	#5
2014	Steady	Easy Star Records	#1
2015	Bright Days	Easy Star Records	—
2016	Make It Better	Rootfire Cooperative	#1
2023	Love In Time	Easy Star Records	-

=== Live albums ===
Chart History
Year	Album	Label	Billboard peak
2009	Live Up!	Self-produced	—
2010	Live Up! Volume II	Self-produced	—

=== Singles ===
Title	Release date	Album
"Buffalo"	2006	Slow Down
"Burkina Faso"	2006	Slow Down
"Forever Party"	2006	Slow Down
"Incognito"	2006	Slow Down
"Missing You More"	2006	Slow Down
"Seasons Change"	2006	Slow Down
"International Mother" (Live)	2009	Live Up!
"Next Best Explosion" (Live)	2010	Live Up! Volume II
"All Night Music"	2012	Country
"Change You"	2012	Country
"Far Away"	2012	Country
"Get Me Through"	2012	Country
"Love You More"	2012	Country
"Kids in the Square"	2012	Country
"New Speedway Boogie"	2012	Country
"Family Sake"	2012	In These Times
"In These Times"	2012	In These Times
"Next Best Explosion"	2012	In These Times
"Favorite Song"	2014	Steady
"Hurt Your Brother"	2014	Steady
"Move"	2014	Steady
"Mr. Cop"	2014	Steady
"Nice Feeling" (feat. Kaya Savage)	2014	Steady
"Not The Fool"	2014	Steady
"Solution"	2014	Steady
"Steady"	2014	Steady
"Take Your Place" (feat. Ranking Joe)	2014	Steady
"Wolf at the Door"	2014	Steady
"Humboldt County Gold"	2015	Bright Days
"Trust In Time"	2015	Bright Days
"Gotta Make A Living"	2016	Make It Better
"Make It Better"	2016	Make It Bettrr
"Really True"	2016	Make It Better
"Signs"	2016	Make It Better
"Cool It"	2019	(Single)
"Good Love"	2019	(Single)
"Stop Fighting"	2019	(Single)
"Won't Be The Last Time"	2020	(Single)
"Solidarity" (feat. Kevin Kinsella)	April 2, 2021	(Single)
"Really True" (The Scientist Dub)	May 21, 2021	(Single)
"Hold You Tonight"	July 2, 2021	(Single)
"Narita"	August 20, 2021	(Single)

== See also ==
- List of jam bands
- List of reggae musicians
- Music of New York
