= The Histronic =

- Origin: Minneapolis, Minnesota, United States
- Genres: Electronic music Livetronica
- Labels: the Histronic
- Members: Kevin Dorsey; Mike Moilanen
- Website: http://www.thehistronic.com

The Histronic is an electronic music and livetronica band based in Minneapolis, Minnesota, United States. The current members are Mike Moilanen (guitar) and Kevin Dorsey (keyboard).

== History ==
Formerly a live electro trio, The Histronic now features the duo of: DJ and guitarist Mike Moilanen, and DJ and keyboard player Kevin Dorsey. Dorsey is a founding member of the group, a graduate of the University of Denver's Lamont School of music, and the owner of a recording studio in Plymouth, Minnesota (Milkhouse Productions). Mike Moilanen is the resident Saturday night DJ at the 414 Soundbar club in Minneapolis, a fixture in the house music scene in Minneapolis, and a producer of house, deep house, and tech house.

The Histronic has played festivals such as: 10,000 Lakes Festival, Harvest Fest, Summer Dance (at Nelson Ledges Quarry Park), and Fat Fest. The band has performed alongside national acts such as: EOTO, Lotus, Particle, Motet Trio, Flaming Lips, Phil Lesh and Friends, George Clinton and P Funk; Medeski, Scofield, Martin, & Wood; Michael Franti & Spearhead, DJ Harry, The Allmighty Senators, Spam Allstars, Darkstar Orchestra, Wookiefoot, Kinetix, Omaur Bliss, Yoni, Mike Moilanen, Sol Spectre, Papadosio, Aleph-1, Shoeless Revolution, Jeff Bujak, Digital Frontier, MO2- Mind Orchestra, and Steez.

== Style ==
The Histronic spins house, deep house, tech house, techno, breakbeat, dubstep, and nu disco. They also add instruments such as analog synthesizers, Hammond organs, and guitars to their show.

== Discography ==
- The Histronic (self-released, 2008)
- Live Cuts Volume Two (2008)
- Live Cuts Volume One (2007)

== Press reviews ==
According to an article in Jambands.com in 2008:

This formula—two for the body, one for the head—works. It works so well I’m willing to type that this is the best jamband album I have heard in 2008. And next year, with Phish injecting a whale-load of spunk into the jamband scene, the Histronic will hopefully capitalize and bring their brand of jam to a theater near you.

— David Paul Kleinman, Jambands.com

The band has also been reviewed in the Duluth Budgeteer Review (July 10, 2008) and Volume One Magazine Review (November 20, 2008).
