= Tool for Evening =

Studio album by The Big Wu
- Released: Memorial Day Weekend 2004
- Recorded: January 2004
- Genre: Rock and Roll
- Label: Oarfin Records
- Producers: Chris Castino; Al Oikari; Terry Vanderwalker; Padre Pienbique

The Big Wu chronology
Spring Reverb (2002)	Tool for Evening (2004)

Tool for Evening is a studio album released by The Big Wu during the seventh annual Big Wu Family Reunion on Memorial Day weekend in 2004. Their fourth release, the album was recorded 20 minutes outside of The Big Wu's birthplace at Pachyderm Studio in Cannon Falls, Minnesota. The band took an unconventional approach to producing the CD, when they walked into the studio and set up their equipment, not knowing what songs were to be played or how they were going to sound. "We wanted to capture the same feeling as our live shows," said Big Wu guitarist [[Chris Castino]]. "I believe we’ve accomplished that. Tool For Evening has a fresh feel to it that comes through more on this CD than on past releases."

The CD contains the previously unreleased Wu favorites "Texas Fireball" and "Jazz 88". The Big Wu also pushed their musical ability by interlacing elements of electronica to create the slow trance groove "Black Rain". Other new material includes the southern-rock song "Dog’s Dead" that rings with that Big Wu classic sound, and the country-styled "Stole My Girlfriend".

== Track listing ==
1. "Texas Fireball"
2. "Stole My Girlfriend"
3. "Dog's Dead"
4. "Middle of Nowhere"
5. "Ray Charles Can See"
6. "Jazz 88"
7. "Black Rain"
8. "Kings of Bass"
9. "I'm Cryin'"
10. "Lowdown"

== Miscellaneous ==
- The new CD made Homegrown Music's Top 10 seller's list
- The CD's release at the Seventh Annual Big Wu Family Reunion was praised by critics and fans, and the first printing sold out before the band could even implement a publicity campaign
