= Live at the Fitzgerald =

Live album by The Big Wu
- Released: Memorial Day weekend 2000
- Genre: Rock and Roll, Jam band
- Label: Phoenix Rising

The Big Wu chronology
Welcome to the Family, Baby (1999)	Live at the Fitzgerald (2000)	Folktales (2000)

Live at the Fitzgerald is the first live album (third album including studio albums) released by the rock n' roll jam band The Big Wu. It was released at their third annual Family Reunion on Memorial Day weekend in 2000. It was recorded at the historic Fitzgerald Theater in downtown St. Paul on April 21, 2000.

The album's inlay card showcases photography by long time band photographer Jason Weidman, including a two page fish eye view of the Fitzgerald Theater audience when the lights go on at the precise moment the band sings "hey-o, is everybody here!"

== Track listing ==
1. "Band Intro" — 1:38
2. "Minnesota Moon" — 5:50
3. "Oxygen" — 11:31
4. "Elani, Queen of Afghanistan" — 4:28
5. "All Good" — 7:03
6. "Puerto Rico" — 5:33
7. "Southern Energy" — 12:55
8. "Man Smart, Women Smarter" — 5:02
9. "Dancing with Lulu" — 5:13
10. "Jazz 88" — 8:33
11. "Gimme a Raise" — 5:53
