= Folk tale (disambiguation) =

A folktale or folk tale is a story from the oral literature.

Folktale, Folktales, Folk Tale, etc. may also refer to:

- A Folk Tale, an 1854 ballet by Danish choreographer August Bournonville
- Folk Tale (album), a 2011 album by Christy Moore
- Folktales (album), a 2000 studio album by the band The Big Wu
- Folktales (film), a 2025 Norwegian-American documentary film
