= Welcome to the Family, Baby =

Studio album by The Big Wu
- Released: October 1999
- Genre: Rock and Roll, Jam band
- Label: Phoenix Rising

The Big Wu chronology
Tracking Buffalo Through the Bathtub (1997)	Welcome to the Family, Baby (1999)	Live at the Fitzgerald (2000)

Welcome to the Family, Baby is the second album released by the rock and roll jam band The Big Wu.

== Track listing ==
1. "Howl Chant"
2. "Break of Day"
3. "Shantytown"
4. "Midnight Rudy"
5. "House of Wu"
6. "Angie O'Plasty"
7. "Werewolves of London"
8. "Parade Drums"
9. "Red Sky"
