= Kevin Kinsella =

American reggae and roots rock musician

- Born: 1972 (age 53–54)
- Origin: Ithaca, New York
- Genres: Reggae; Roots Reggae; Americana
- Instruments: Acoustic guitar Electric guitar
- Years active: 1987–Present
- Labels: I Town Records; ROIR; Shanachie Records
- Website: www.kevinkinsella.com

Kevin Kinsella is a reggae and roots rock musician who has participated in 28 studio albums since 1987. He is a founding member of John Brown's Body and 10 Foot Ganja Plant. He lives in Ithaca, New York. He has been noted as one of the pioneers of the American reggae scene and has been called "Father of East Coast Reggae".

== History ==
In 1987 Kevin Kinsella founded the band Tribulations when he was just 15 years old in Ithaca, NY. Kevin and his childhood friend Josh Newman headed the band. The band gained regional notoriety in the northeast and opened for Toots and the Maytals.

In 1995 Kevin Kinsella founded the reggae band John Brown's Body During this time period Kevin released their first album "All Time" (1996) on Kevin's label I Town Records. They also recorded "Among Them" (1998), This Day (2000), and "Spirits All Around Us (2002).

Kevin Kinsella also released two acoustic styled albums as solo releases "I-Town Revival" (2000) and "Firestick (2002).

In 2006 Kevin Kinsella left John Brown's Body on good terms to pursue his solo career and to continue to record with 10 Ft. Ganja Plant.

In 2011 Kevin released his 3rd solo album titled "Great Design, followed by "Riding Higher Still" in 2014.

In 2015 Kevin played a string of dates with Matisyahu with Matiyahu's band Dub Trio as his backing band.

In 2017 Kevin helped organize and curate the talent for the inaugural Ithaca Reggae Festival at Stewart Park in Ithaca, New York.

== Musical Influences ==
Some of Kevin Kinsella's influences include The Meditations and The Gladiators. In 2018 Kevin Kinsella played with his idol Clinton Fearon at the Ithaca Reggae Festival in Ithaca, NY.

== Discography ==
=== Collaborations ===
- Kevin Kinsella & Ti Ti Chickapea Firestick (2002) -- feat. Hank Roberts, Richie Stearns and Eric Aceto
- Gregory Stephens and Kevin Kinsella AM Gold (2018)

=== Solo ===
- Kevin Kinsella "At Imperial Sound, Vol. 1" (2023)
- Kevin Kinsella Riding Higher Still (2014)
- Kevin Kinsella Great Design (2011)
- Kevin Kinsella I-Town Revival (2006)

=== 10 Ft. Ganja Plant ===
- 10 FT. Ganja Plant 10 Deadly Shots Vol. III (2014)
- 10 FT. Ganja Plant "Skycatcher" (2013)
- 10 FT. Ganja Plant 10 Deadly Shots Vol. II (2012)
- 10 FT. Ganja Plant Shake Up The Place (2011)
- 10 FT. Ganja Plant 10 Deadly Shots Vol. I (2010)
- 10 FT. Ganja Plant Bush Rock (2009)
- 10 FT. Ganja Plant Bass Chalice (2005)
- 10 FT. Ganja Plant Midnight Landing (2003)
- 10 FT. Ganja Plant Do Right / Top Down 45 rpm (2003)
- 10 FT. Ganja Plant Hillside Airstrip (2001)
- 10 FT. Ganja Plant Politricking Man / Fight Them a Fight 45 rpm (2001)
- 10 FT. Ganja Plant Presents (2000)
- 10 FT. Ganja Plant Good Time Girl / Good News Dub 45 rpm (2000)

=== John Brown's Body ===
- John Brown's Body Pressure Points (2005)
- John Brown's Body Spirits All Around Us (2002)
- Justin Hinds Live at Grassroots (2002)
- John Brown's Body This Day (2000)
- John Brown's Body Among Them (1998)
- John Brown's Body All Time (1996)

=== Tribulations ===
- Tribulations Daddy Good Pieces (1994)
- Tribulations The Gate (1992)
- Tribulations Youth Sound Power (1991)
- Tribulations Who Likes Reggae Music (1988)
- Tribulations City / Dancing In The Rain 45 rpm (1987)

== Other activities ==
Kevin Kinsella founded in 1983 Avalon Ventures, but not this Kevin Kinsella.
