= North Avenue Wake Up Call =

Studio album by the Freddy Jones Band
- Released: 1995
- Recorded: Chicago Recording Company
- Genre: Rock
- Label: Capricorn
- Producer: Justin Niebank

The Freddy Jones Band chronology
Waiting for the Night (1993)	North Avenue Wake Up Call (1995)	Lucid (1997)

North Avenue Wake Up Call is an album by the American band the Freddy Jones Band, released in 1995. The title refers to the Chicago expressway exit the band used whenever they returned home from touring.

The album peaked at No. 186 on the Billboard 200. The band supported the album by touring with Sonia Dada.

== Production ==
The album was produced by Justin Niebank. It is about life as a working band; all four Freddy Jones Band members contributed to the songwriting, inspired by spending 250 days on tour the previous year. The band undertook short tours while recording the album to help them better shape the songs. Howard Levy played harmonica on the album.

== Critical reception ==
Professional ratings
Review scores
Source	Rating
AllMusic	4/5 stars
The Cincinnati Post	B−
Daily Herald	3.5/4 stars
MusicHound Rock: The Essential Album Guide	3/5 stars
Star–Banner	3.5/4 stars

The Chicago Tribune wrote that "the band showcases its breezy, polished blend of sharp guitar hooks, congenial melodies, and dusty tales of life on the road... The songs seamlessly mix bits of R&B, roots music, rock, and blues." The Sun-Sentinel called the album "a funked-up mixture of rock and blues as befits Chicago natives; the FJB takes it all in and plays it right back out in measure." The Richmond Times-Dispatch opined that the Freddy Jones Band "maintains its lithe melodies with an added power punch."

The State noted that "'Deep in the Flow' is funky; 'Wherever You Roam' is bluesy; and the band approaches ZZ Top decibel levels on 'Goodbye'." The Daily Herald determined that "the Jones boys' hallmarks are melodic invention, strong vocals and incisive instrumental work—all elements present in force here." The Cincinnati Post concluded that "Hammond organ and mandolin fills help give this pop its Midwestern character, with a rock and blues base." The Star–Banner deemed the album "a sincere-sounding set of progressive, groove-intensive rock that's also radio-friendly."

AllMusic wrote that the "impressive" album "retains the group's roots rock attack but manages to pay more attention to songs and lyrics."

== Track listing ==
No.	Title	Length
0.	"Play Guitar"	0:52
1.	"Waitress"	3:09
2.	"Old Angels"	5:16
3.	"Hold On to Midnight"	5:09
4.	"Ferris Wheel"	6:17
5.	"Rain"	5:41
6.	"Turn"	3:57
7.	"Goodbye"	4:10
8.	"Alone"	7:13
9.	"This Could Be Soon"	4:12
10.	"Deep in the Flow"	4:37
11.	"Rietiem"	4:39
12.	"Wherever You Roam"	5:12
13.	"Warm Like Home"	4:00
14.	"Under the Tree"	3:48
