= Launchpad (album) =

Studio album by Particle
- Released: March 23, 2004
- Genre: Fusion, Jamband, Progressive Rock, Electronica
- Length: 61:50
- Label: Or Music

Particle chronology
Launchpad (2004)	Accelerator (2018)

Launchpad is the debut album by Particle.

== Track listing ==
1. "Launchpad" (7:17)
2. "Metropolics" (3:39)
3. "The Elevator" (7:31)
4. "Below Radar" (5:24)
5. "The Banker" (6:10)
6. "Kneeknocker" (8:41)
7. "Road's a Breeze (@3AM)" (8:10)
8. "7 Minutes Till Radio Darkness, Part 1" (1:48)
9. "7 Minutes Till Radio Darkness, Part 2" (2:31)
10. "Sun Mar 11" (10:39)

== Personnel ==
- Eric Gould - Bass guitar
- Charlie Hitchcock - Guitar
- Steve Molitz - Keyboards
- Darren Pujalet - Drums

== Reception ==
Professional ratings
Review scores
Source	Rating
The Idaho Statesman	3.5/5 stars

Dustin Glass, of the magazine Glide, thought that while the album was "tight and energetic" in terms of musicianship, and captured the bands live sound, its style could become repetitive across the work. Jim Stanford, in the Jackson Hole News and Guide, thought what set the band apart from other jam bands was their instrumental "intensity".
