= John Brown's Body (band) =

American reggae and dub band

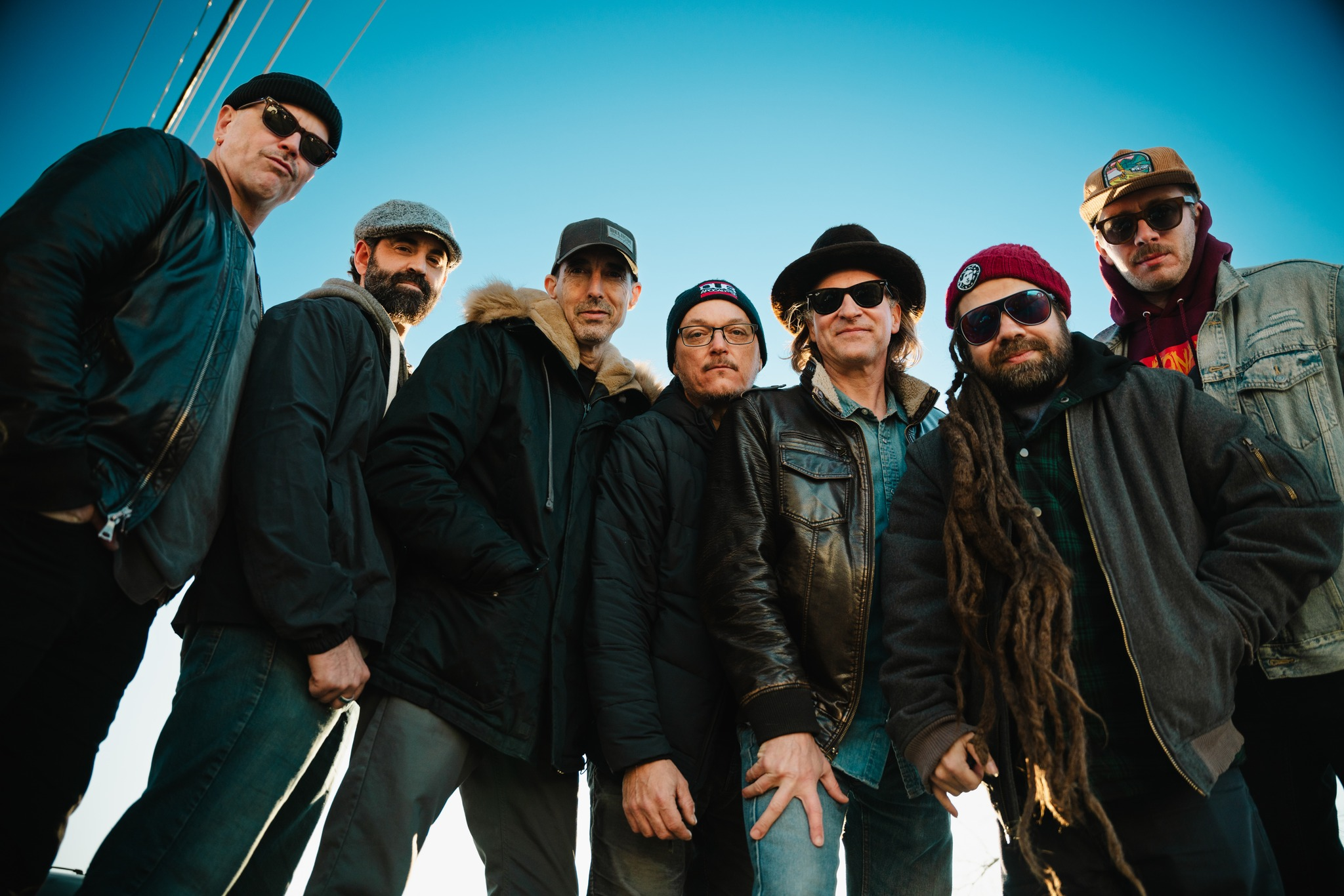

Background information
- Origin: Ithaca, New York; Boston, Massachusetts
- Genres: Reggae, Dub, Indie
- Years active: 1995–present
- Labels: Easy Star Records; I-Town Records; Shanachie Records
- Members: Kevin Kinsella; Tommy Benedetti; Nate Edgar; Jon "JP" Petronzio; Lee Hamilton; TJ Schaper; Van Gordon Martin
- Past members: Elliot Martin; Dan Delacruz; Chris Welter; David Gould; Mike Keenan; Nate Edgar; Scott Flynn; Mathew Goodwin; Nate Silas Richardson; Alex Beram; Josh Newman; Sam Godin; Scott Palmer (deceased); Paul Merrill; Alex Toth; Annakalmia Traver; Brian Thomas; Jason "Jocko" Randall; Sam Dechenne; Dan Africano; Mikey Vitale
- Website: www.johnbrownsbodymusic.com

John Brown's Body is an American eight-piece reggae and dub band with origins in Ithaca, New York, and Boston, Massachusetts. With a two-decade-long tenure, they have been recognized for their intricate fusion of vocals, percussion, keyboard, bass, guitar and a three-piece horn section. John Brown's Body, also known as JBB, has been credited with contributing to the development of the "contemporary American reggae scene", as stated by Rudeboy Reggae.

Formed in the mid-1990s in Ithaca, New York, John Brown's Body (JBB) was among a select few U.S. reggae bands to embark on national tours. Over the years, JBB has played a significant role in shaping the identity of "American reggae." Their music is rooted in traditional reggae vibes but also incorporates elements from various genres. Unlike many American reggae bands, which often focus on conventional reggae themes such as religion and marijuana, JBB adopts an indie band approach, crafting songs that utilize reggae influences to convey their own unique experiences. This distinctive approach has garnered widespread appeal.

The group's 2008 album, Amplify, reached the #1 spot on the Billboard Reggae Chart. This was followed by JBB In Dub in 2012, which also reached #1 on the iTunes Reggae Chart. Additionally, their albums Kings And Queens in 2013 and Fireflies in 2016 both topped both the Billboard and iTunes Reggae Charts at #1.

JBB's distinctive style has become influential within the U.S. reggae scene, with many artists in the genre acknowledging John Brown's Body as a significant influence. Their eleventh studio album, Fireflies, was released on September 9, 2016, via Easy Star Records. It debuted at #1 on both the Billboard and iTunes Reggae charts.

== History ==
=== Formation, development, and studio albums (1996-2006) ===
John Brown's Body was established in the mid-1990s. In 1996, the band released their debut studio album, All Time, under their own label, I-Town Records. The album was recognized on Rolling Stone's "Top 10 Indie Records List."

After their debut, JBB secured a record deal with the reggae label Shanachie Records. They subsequently released three albums: their second album, Among Them in 1998, their third album, This Day in 2000, and their fourth album, Spirits All Around Us in 2002.

Following the release of This Day, the Boston Herald hailed JBB as "one of the world's best roots-style reggae bands." Subsequently, the band garnered positive reviews and performed at the Bob Marley Day Festival in Miami, Florida, alongside Lauryn Hill and other artists. However, Mike Keenan departed from JBB after the release of This Day to focus on raising his children, Oscar and Damon (Damon in 2004). He later returned in 2006, although he did not become an "official" member until that year.

Following the release of Spirits All Around Us, the band gained national recognition. They performed at events such as The Sierra Nevada World Music Festival, Reggae on the Rocks, and Wakarusa.

In 2005, JBB entered into a partnership with the New York City-based record label Easy Star and released their fifth studio album, Pressure Points. This album marked a departure from their traditional roots approach, instead embracing a fusion of reggae and dub elements that they termed "Future Roots." Pressure Points received critical acclaim, with a review from the Village Voice describing JBB as "reverent as well as revolutionary." Additionally, Popmatters characterized the record as the band's "strongest, most consistent effort to date." Elliot Martin contributed to the writing of eight out of eleven songs, a departure from his previous involvement in writing only a few songs on previous albums. Kevin Kinsella wrote the remaining three songs.

=== Disaster, departures, and recovery (2006-2009) ===
In 2006, the band's bassist, Scott Palmer, died from cancer. Nevertheless, lead vocalist Martin and drummer/co-founder Tommy Benedetti continued to lead the band forward.

The band enlisted Boston-based bassist Nate Edgar to fill the position left by Scott. Edgar had been a fan of Scott's since seeing him perform years earlier with DJ Logic's Project Logic.

Additional changes to the JBB lineup involved the departure of vocalist and rhythm guitarist Kinsella, who left the band on amicable terms, and organist/guitarist Nate "Silas" Richardson, who opted to step away from the band to prioritize spending time with his newborn son.

JBB enlisted guitarist Keenan to replace Richardson. Keenan, a former member of The Tribulations and a previous member of JBB who had also taken a break to raise his children, joined the band. Despite these lineup changes, JBB continued to tour. Towards the conclusion of their journey, Dan Delacruz departed from the band. He was replaced by Chris "C-Money" Welter, who had previously been a member of the punk-reggae band Slightly Stoopid.

Kinsella's departure allowed Martin to assume the role of band leader, guiding them towards new musical directions. For a significant period, a creative divergence existed between the two primary songwriters and childhood friends. Kinsella's compositions leaned towards religious and roots-reggae sounds, reminiscent of the band's earlier works. In contrast, Martin's songwriting focused on futuristic and unconventional rhythms, along with dense metaphorical imagery. "I used to think that having two songwriters and vocalists was a strength that made us unique, but it probably confused a lot of people. Now our sound is more cohesive," says Benedetti, "We feel comfortable with one another and you can hear it in the music we're creating."

Shortly before Kinsella's departure, Martin composed three tracks— "Give Yourself Over," "Speak of the Devil," and "Be at Peace"— collectively referred to as the 'rooster' tracks. Following Kinsella's exit, Martin experienced a reduced pressure to conform to a specific JBB sound. As a result, he penned "The Gold," a lively tune infused with drum and bass elements, featuring a guitar line reminiscent of an Ennio Morricone Spaghetti Western soundtrack. Additionally, Martin wrote "Make Your Move," which steered the band towards hip-hop influences. According to Martin, the title track, "The Gold," originated from one of the band's original ideas. He mentioned that "the seeds for that one [The Gold] are five years old. It was originally a hip hop beat, like a Funkadelic song. The bass line was the same, but much more slinky. I didn't know what it would become, but I knew it should be the lead for this record."

In 2007, the band entered the studio to commence work on their sixth record at More Sound, a recording studio owned by sound engineer Jason "Jocko" Randall in Syracuse, New York. It was during this period that Elliot began to experience issues with his vocal strength and endurance. Following several months of medical consultations and vocal training, Elliot received a diagnosis of vocal polyps. In early 2008, Martin underwent surgery to remove the polyps on his vocal cords and commenced voice training to learn techniques to reduce strain on his throat. A statement from the band's website noted: "I feel better every day. Each show back after surgery, I could feel myself getting stronger. Now I think I'm doing things I couldn't even do before," further adding, "Add that to the energy of the new line-up and this new batch of songs."

The band's album Amplify was released under the New York City label Easy Star Records. It debuted at #1 on Billboard's Reggae Albums chart, #10 on CMJ's World Music Chart, and was included on the iTunes "Beat of 2008" list for reggae records. Following the album's release, the band embarked on their first U.S. tour in nearly two years.

According to All Music Guide, "Elliot Martin has taken firmer control of the group and now it [JBB] is now a completely different organism; although the John Brown's Body sound is still distinctly reggae-ish, it's denser, swirlier, sometimes downright funky and loaded with more melodic hooks."

=== Success and touring: Re-Amplify EP (2009-2010) ===
On March 17, 2009, JBB launched their first remix EP titled Re-Amplify under the Easy Star label. The EP made its debut in the Billboard Reggae Top 10. It showcased remixes of JBB's Amplify album created by artists from various locations worldwide, including Dubmatix from Toronto, WrongTom from London, and their friend Kasongo from Gym Class Heroes.

Following adjustments to the horn section, JBB welcomed trombonist Scott Flynn, saxophonist Drew Sayers, and trumpet player Sam Dechenne. In 2009, the band embarked on tours, including 16 shows in the United Kingdom with labelmates Easy Star All-Stars and 11 shows in New Zealand with The Black Seeds, who were also label mates with Easy Star. This tour fostered a musical bond with The Black Seeds, culminating in a joint performance at the 2010 Grassroots Music Festival in Ithaca, NY.

In December 2009, JBB recorded a cover of "Bankrobber" by The Clash for a charity album titled Shatter the Hotel: The Songs of Joe Strummer in Dub. The proceeds from this album were donated to support Strummerville: The Joe Strummer Foundation for New Music.

In 2010, JBB participated in performances on Jam Cruise, which took place off the coast of Jamaica and Grand Cayman Island. In April and May 2010, the group embarked on their inaugural tours in France, Belgium, Germany, the Netherlands, and Canada, where they performed at various festivals and headlined clubs.

=== Return to the studio: Kings and Queens and Fireflies (2013–2016) ===
On April 16, 2013, JBB unveiled its eighth studio album, Kings and Queens. Neil Kelly of PopMatters commented on the album, "where they have stayed true to their roots on previous releases, JBB incorporates many electronic embellishments and elements on Kings and Queens, giving the album as a whole a modern, American touch." The album comprised 12 new tracks and was released in various formats, including iTunes download, CD, and 180-gram vinyl LP. This marked the first occasion where a vinyl version was readily accessible for fans. Upon its release, the album achieved significant chart success, debuting at #1 on both the Billboard and iTunes Reggae charts. Additionally, it reached #23 on Billboard's Heatseekers Chart, #4 on the Northeast New Artist Chart, and #188 on the Top 200 Digital Albums chart.

In September 2016, the band released the album Fireflies, which subsequently reached the top position on the Billboard Reggae Albums Chart.

=== Reformation with founding member Kevin Kinsella (2024 - Present) ===
In 2024, John Brown's Body announced a reunion involving original members Kevin Kinsella (vocals), Tommy Benedetti (drums), and Lee Hamilton (saxophone), alongside longstanding members Nate Edgar (bass), Jon Pentonzio (keys), and TJ Schaper (trombone), as well as newcomer Van Gordon Martin (guitar). This reunion follows the group's performances in early 2023, during which original lead singer Kevin Kinsella rejoined the band to uphold its legacy. The reunion marks a continuation of their influential presence in the American Reggae scene, promising both the revival of classic hits and the introduction of new music.

== Influences ==
Elliot Martin mentioned being influenced by various artists while writing Amplify, including Sigur Rós, Batch, Toumani Diabate, Sly and Robbie, Radiohead, Talib Kweli, Aswad, Funkadelic, King Tubby, Roots Manuva, Masaru Sato, and Midnite. Vaughn Benjamin, the lead singer of Midnite, contributed vocals to the end of the track Speak Of The Devil.

"I think that the strongest reggae was coming out of the UK in the 70's and early 80's," Elliot explains. "It was the best produced, had the most complex song writing; it's the most progressive reggae that's been made. Steel Pulse, Aswad, Reggae Regular, Misty in Roots, Mikey Dread, Dennis Bovell and Linton Kwesi Johnson were doing ground-breaking stuff. I want to pick up where those artists left off. Of course, we don't come close to what those artists did, but I think that's where the idea comes from—that reggae can take other forms. I guess I'm just saying that I see our music as progressive reggae."

== Awards ==
- 2008: #1 Billboard Reggae Chart debut
- 2008: CMJ World Music Chart Top 10 debut

== Recent collaborations ==
Martin contributed vocals to the album Work to Do by the Iowa reggae band Public Property. Additionally, he collaborated with the Baltimore-based band Can't Hang on their 2009 release Ride The Lightrail.

== Discography ==
=== Studio albums ===
Chart History
Year	Album	Label	Billboard peak
1996	All Time	I-Town Records	—
1998	Among Them	I-Town Records	—
2000	This Day	Shanachie Records	—
2002	Spirits All Around Us	Shanachie Records	—
2005	Pressure Points	Easy Star Records	—
2008	Amplify	Easy Star Records	#1
2013	Kings & Queens	Easy Star Records	#1 #23 (Billboard Heatseekers Chart)
2016	Fireflies	Easy Star Records	#1

=== EP's/Live & Dub albums ===
Chart History
Year	Album	Label	Billboard peak
2002	Justin Hinds & John Brown's Body: Live at Grassroots	Easy Star Records	—
2009	Re-Amplify EP	Easy Star Records	—
2012	JBB In Dub	Easy Star Records	—
2015	Kings & Queens In Dub	Easy Star Records	—

=== Singles ===
Title	Release date	Album
"All Time"	1996	All Time
"Words of the Prophets (A.D. 1996)"	1996	All Time
"If You Want To Sing"	1996	All Time
"Music Is My Only Friend"	1998	Among Them
"Rainbow Chariot"	1998	Among Them
"This Is Not The End"	1998	Among Them
"Jah Works"	2000	This Day
"Land Far Away"	2000	This Day
"Isle of Springs"	2000	This Day
"33 RPM"	2002	Spirits All Around Us
"Traveling Man"	2002	Spirits All Around Us
"Original Man"	2002	Spirits All Around Us
"Follow Into Shadow"	2005	Pressure Points
"Resonate"	2005	Pressure Points
"Blazing Love"	2005	Pressure Points
"Full Control"	2005	Pressure Points
"Picking Up"	2005	Pressure Points
"The Gold"	2008	Amplify
"Give Yourself Over"	2008	Amplify
"Be At Peace"	2008	Amplify
"Speak Of The Devil" (feat. Vaughn Benjamin of Midnite)	2008	Amplify
"Push Some Air"	2008	Amplify
"Struggling" (Live @ Aggie Theatre)	March 17, 2009	Re-Amplify EP
"Old John Brown"	2013	Kings & Queens
"Step Inside"	2013	Kings & Queens
"Plantation"	2013	Kings & Queens
"Fall On Deep"	2013	Kings & Queens
"Empty Hands"	2013	Kings & Queens
"Dust Bowl"	2013	Kings & Queens
"Deep Summer"	2013	Kings & Queens
"New Fashion"	2016	Fireflies
"Who Paid Them Off?"	2016	Fireflies
"Hard Man Fe Dead" (feat. Karim Israel of Arise Roots)	2016	Fireflies
"Like A Queen"	2016	Fireflies
"High Grade"	2016	Fireflies
"Badman"	2016	Fireflies
"Pure Fire"	2016	Fireflies
"Mash Them Down"	2016	Fireflies
