= Tracking Buffalo Through the Bathtub =

Studio album by The Big Wu
- Released: September 12, 1997
- Recorded: Latch Lake Studios in Eagan, Minnesota
- Genre: Rock and Roll, Jam band
- Length: 56:40
- Label: Phoenix Rising
- Producer: Jeff Roberts; Al Oikari; Chris Castino

The Big Wu chronology
Tracking Buffalo Through the Bathtub (1997)	Welcome to the Family, Baby! (1999)

Professional ratings
Review scores
Source	Rating
AllMusic	2.5/5 stars

Tracking Buffalo Through the Bathtub was the first studio album released by the rock n' roll jam band The Big Wu in 1997. It was released at the Cabooze Bar in Minneapolis during CD Release party hosted by the band.

== Track listing ==
1. "Silcanturnitova" – 3:45
2. "Kangaroo" – 4:05
3. "Midnight Rudy" – 6:03
4. "Bloodhound" – 5:09
5. "Puerto Rico" – 5:51
6. "Pinnacle" – 4:32
7. "Precious Hands" – 6:25
8. "Gimme A Raise" – 4:01
9. "Take The World By Storm" – 7:53
10. "Red Sky" – 8:61
