= Jam Camp =

American jam band

Jam Camp is an American jam band based in the Seattle area of the Pacific Northwest. The band includes David Broyles (guitar), Steve Munger (saxophone), Michael "Smitty" Smith (guitar), Jess White (bass), and Joel Veatch (drums). The result of regular studio-based jam sessions in the late 1980s, the project was officially dubbed Jam Camp in 1989 (a reference to camping in the studio for the debut disc's recording session). This band creates fusionesque rock-improv in the vein of The Allman Brothers, Zappa, King Crimson, Soft Machine, Brand X and Traffic - bands that influenced more than a few of their 1990s jam band contemporaries. Known for their improvisational skills, Jam Camp records in the studio straight to disc, embracing a "live" feel-based approach to music appealing to fans of progressive rock, classic rock, jazz and Jam alike.

The band has released three CDs: Jam Camp (1990), Black Hills Jam: Preserves Vol.2 (2004) and Jam Camp Live! (2006).

== Discography ==
- 2006: Jam Camp Live! (Flying Spot Entertainment)
- 2004: Black Hills Jam - Preserves Vol. II (Flying Spot Records)
- 1990: Jam Camp (For Art Sake Records)
