= Ten Ton Chicken =

US musical group

Ten Ton Chicken is a jam band out of Berkeley, California. Their music blends psychedelia, progressive, funk, and rock. The band has played hundreds of concerts through the western United States.

== History and discography ==
The improvisational groove rock band Ten Ton Chicken has performed generously throughout the west coast since being hatched in 1998. Their inception coincided with the revitalization of the Bay Area's jam music scene at the turn of the new century.

The Chicken is mostly known for their energy packed live shows featuring quirky, original songs influenced by diverse selection of music genres. The band's original line-up of; Gary Morrell (Guitar, Vocals), Rich Di Benedetto (Drums), Nick Peck (Keys, Vocals) and Eric "Doc" Kampman (Bass, Vocals), recorded the bands, seldom heard and very limited released, first LP, "De Cocksdorp" (1999).

A change in the make up of Ten Ton Chicken occurred in 2001 when "Doc" left to pursue other aspects of life. With the addition of Tom Fejes (Bass, Vocals) and Jamison Smeltz (Sax, Vocals), the band's progressive roots took on a more groovy, jam rock sound. Demand for Ten Ton Chicken on Jam radio shows and on MP3 increased greatly after the release of their first two EP albums, "Just Like in the Old Country" (2002), and "In Search Of" (2003) both on the Home Grown Music Network's label, Harmonized Records.

"Just Like in the Old Country" is a studio & live mix, highlighting the band's eclectic array of improvised jams. New keyboardist, Greg Sankovich, took over for Peck prior to the recording of the commercially successful, "In Search Of", which is a diverse selection of funky, bluesy, jazzy, witty, progressive rock songs.

In 2006, after a short hiatus, Ten Ton Chicken reemerged on the San Francisco scene for some live performances as a newly formed quartet, with Morrell, Di Benedetto, Fejes and Smeltz carrying the feathery torch. With a new stable of originals songs, Ten Ton Chicken entered the studio to produce their, long-awaited, fourth CD, "Efitol".

2010 saw the release of Efitol. Tackling issues such as the right to say midget, the taboo love of one's second cousin, the right to elect a dope, as well as the right to be the pope, Efitol is a diverse CD of eleven wacky original songs.

In 2022, with a new lineup, TTC released, Our Green World. New members are Fred Callaway (Keys, Vocals), Garrett Frisch (Drums), Mark Francis (Guitar, Vocals), and Jamison Smaltz on Bass Guitar, and Gary Morrell remains on lead guitar and vocals.

2024 saw the release of Blue Earth Moon on 2/29/24.

They have released five CDs:

- De Cocksdorp (1999) (difficult to find)
- Just Like In The Old Country (2001)
- In Search Of (2003)
- Efitol (2010)
- Our Green World (2022)
- Blue Earth Moon (2024)
