= The Big Wu Family Reunion =

Annual music festival in Minnesota, USA

The Big Wu Family Reunion (BWFR) is an annual music festival hosted by the Rock and Roll jam band The Big Wu. It is held during an August weekend at the Camp Maiden Rock West in Morristown, Minnesota, and features multiple bands on one or two stages as well as on-site camping.

== History ==
On July 17, 1998, the Big Wu created a tradition by throwing the first ever Big Wu Family Reunion at Latch Lake Studios in Eagan, Minnesota (the very place where their first CD, Tracking Buffalo Through the Bathtub had been recorded the year before). The next year the Family Reunion was held at Harmony Park Music Garden in Geneva, Minnesota. Over the past years, it has been held at either Harmony Park or the Jamboree Campground in Black River Falls, Wisconsin. 2006 marked the ninth annual year that the festival has taken place. The Festival is now held annually at Camp Maiden Rock West in Morristown, Minnesota.
