= Pert Near Sandstone =

Pert Near Sandstone is an Americana/Roots band from Minneapolis/St. Paul, Minnesota, and an influential part of the Minnesota Roots Music scene that includes contemporaries Charlie Parr, Trampled By Turtles, and The Cactus Blossoms. Since forming in 2004, Pert Near Sandstone has recorded eight full-length albums, two live albums, and several singles. They have toured the United States extensively with several tours through Europe. Former full-time member (and now collaborator) Ryan Young plays fiddle with Trampled By Turtles. Dave Simonett of Trampled By Turtles has cited Pert Near Sandstone as one of his favorite contemporary bluegrass acts in the United States. Beginning in 2015, Pert Near Sandstone has curated and hosted the Blue Ox Music Festival in Eau Claire, Wisconsin, attracting acts such as The Avett Brothers and Mike Gordon of Phish. Pert Near Sandstone have shared the stage with many legendary musical talents such as Ralph Stanley, Del McCoury, Steve Martin and the Steep Canyon Rangers, Wilco, and Yonder Mountain Stringband.

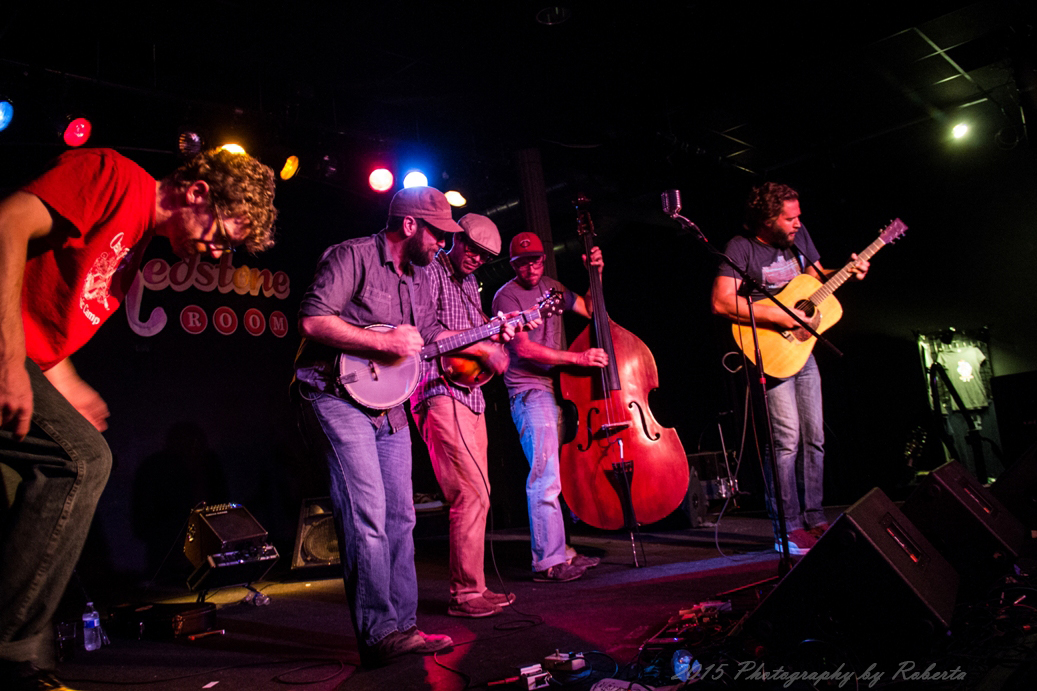

In a May 27, 2012 opinion piece in the Minneapolis Star Tribune, "Pert Near Sandstone" and "Trampled By Turtles" were singled out as examples of terrible Minnesota band names.

== Notable accomplishments ==
- Since 2015, helped create and continues to host the Blue Ox Music Festival in Eau Claire, WI, a family owned and operated multiday camping event that features top national and local roots and Americana artists. The festival is limited to 5000 attendees and is among the most prestigious boutique music festivals in the US, with past headliners such as Bela Fleck and the Flecktones, Jason Isbell & the 400 Unit, Old Crow Medicine Show, and many more.
- In 2017, Nate Sipe and Kevin Kniebel worked on Ishmael, a theatrical play directed and adapted by Leo Geter based on Herman Melville’s Moby Dick. The musical score was written by Nate Sipe, who performed alongside Kniebel, Jack Weston, and Jim Parker. The play debuted in Big Sky, Montana, at the Warren Miller Performing Arts Center. It subsequently ran as part of the 2018 season at The Jungle Theater in Minneapolis, Minnesota.
- Since 2019, Pert Near Sandstone’s Nate Sipe and Justin Bruhn produce the “Road To Blue Ox” podcast, interviewing mainstage headliners prior to the Blue Ox Music Festival.
- In 2008 they performed on A Prairie Home Companion.
- In 2010 they won the Band Competition at Yonder Mountain String Band's Northwest String Summit at Horning's Hideout in North Plains, Oregon.
- Pert Near Sandstone's cover of the Beatles song I Am the Walrus from the album Minnesota Beatle Project, Volume 2 (2010) was inducted into Minnesota Public Radio’s (89.3 The Current) Chart Show Hall of Fame in 2011 following 12 weeks on the Top 20 list: 10 of these weeks in the top 5, and 5 weeks at No. 1. This benefit album and particularly this song received positive press both locally and nationally.
- The 2011 album "Paradise Hop" was positively received by both local and national press, including the Minneapolis Star Tribune, the City Pages, the roots music magazine No Depression, and The Onion's AV Club.
- The week of November 13–19, 2011, the album "Paradise Hop" was ranked No. 7 on bluegrass downloads at the internet site eMusic.
- Their song "Solid Gone" was in the top 10 of Minnesota Public Radio's "The Chart Show" for four weeks in November–December 2011, and was No. 25 on The Troubadour's Road Top 25 Songs of 2011.
- In 2012, Pert Near Sandstone contributed a track to the compilation "We Love to Be Free: Songs of Life and Love in Support of Freedom to Marry" to support the rejection of a constitutional amendment to ban same-sex marriages in the state of Minnesota. To celebrate the rejection of this ballot initiative, Senator Amy Klobuchar introduced the band at their November 9, 2012 show at First Avenue in Minneapolis.
- On New Year's Day 2013, the Washington DC–based radio station WAMU listed Pert Near Sandstone's session on Bluegrass Country as one of the top 21 sessions of 2012.
- On January 14, 2013, an article at the Denver Post hailed the upcoming Pert Near Sandstone album as one of the most anticipated bluegrass albums of 2013.
- On June 4, 2020, an article from Bluegrass Today referred to Pert Near Sandstone as representing "the essence of Minnesota’s thriving progressive bluegrass community."

== Discography ==
Full-length albums

- Live: Just Outside of Sandstone (2005)
- Up and Down the River (2007)
- Needle & Thread (2008)
- Out On A Spree (2009)
- Paradise Hop (2011)
- The Hardest Part of Leaving (2014)
- Discovery of Honey (2016)
- Live at Blue Ox (2018)
- Rising Tide (2020)
- Waiting Days (2023)

Singles

- Ship of Fools (2013; limited edition 7" vinyl and CD, featuring the songs "Ship of Fools" and "Be Here". Simultaneous release of the "Ship of Fools" music video.)
- Good Times (2017)
- Mary Anna (2023) Cover of Wood Brothers song
- Can't Hardly Wait (2024) Cover of The Replacements song

Compilations

- Minnesota Beatle Project Volume 2 (2010; Vega Productions. CD and LP. Track 9: I Am The Walrus)
- Old Stage Tapes (2010, CD. Track 14: Baltimore Fire)
- Minnesota Beatle Project Volume 3 (2011; Vega Productions. CD and LP. Nate Sipe contributes to Track 6: I've Got a Feeling, with Ryan Young and others.)
- American Buffalo (2012; Noiseland Industries. LP. Record Store Day release, limited to 500 copies and distributed free with purchase at participating record stores in the Twin Cities. Pert Near plays Track 15; album version of "Save Me" from 2011's Paradise Hop.)

Guest Appearances

- Boat with No Oars 2006, by Mary Bue. Nate Sipe appears on “Baby I Love You”, and “Chocolate and Hawaii.”
- The Squirms 2007, by God Johnson. Pert Near Sandstone appears on “Half Past One”
- “Snake Oil Woman 2011, by Johnson Family Band. Nate Sipe appears on “Leprosy Reel”, “Chesapeake Spring”, and "Snake Oil Woman.”
- Boys ‘n’ the Barrels 2011, by Boys ‘n’ the Barrels. Nate Sipe appears on “Look At Me Baby”, “Catnip Rag”, and “On His Own.”
- Twang Album 2023, by Ben Suchy. Nate Sipe appears on “Welcome To The Show”, and “Don’t Turn Red.”
- Live Humdinger by the Minneapolis roots band The Brass Kings. (2010; CD. A Live album recorded at The Cedar Cultural Center. Nate Sipe supports.)

Demo Tape

- Winter Fades (2004, out of print. Nine tracks of traditionals and covers of Peter Rowan, Nick Drake, Jimmie Rodgers, Elizabeth Cotton, and Ween). Featured the original four members of Nate Sipe, J. Lenz, Kevin Kniebel, and Ryan Young.

Side Projects

- Town Hall Stompers 2008-2012. Old time string band consisting of Kevin Kniebel, Nate Sipe, Matt Neil, Liz Draper, Adam Keisling, and Andy Lambert. Became Inactive when Sipe moved out of state.
- Old Time Wu Grass Band 2014. Pert Near Sandstone performed with this alias at the Big Wu Family Reunion in 2014.
- Fiddle Heirs 2011–present. Ryan Young, Nate Sipe, and Jake Hyer started this all-fiddle band which soon grew to include Justin Bruhn, Jillian Rae, and Chris Forsberg.
- Lenz and Frenz 2012–present. J Lenz assembles local Minneapolis musicians for a monthly performance at the 331 Club in NE Minneapolis.
- Frog and the Bog 2021–present. Band consisting of J Lenz and his spouse, Lisanne Bogaard.

== Lineup ==
Current Members

- Kevin Kniebel Banjo, Since 2004
- J Lenz Guitar, Since 2004
- Nate Sipe Mandolin, Fiddle, steel guitar, Since 2004
- Justin Bruhn Bass, Since 2014
- Chris Forsberg Fiddle, Since 2020

Past Members

- Ryan Young Fiddle and guitar, 2004–2009.
- Jeff Swanner Bass, 2005–2010
- Adam Keisling Bass, 2010–2014
- Andy Lambert Clogs and Percussion, 2008–2014, periodically still appearing with Pert Near.
- Matt Cartier Clogs, 2014–2023
