= Mr. Blotto =

Background information
- Origin: Chicago, Illinois, United States
- Website: mrblotto.com

Mr. Blotto is a jam band from Chicago, Illinois. They blend hard rock, original rock, southern rock, folk music, and country rock. They formed in 1991, and continue to tour extensively in the midwest area. Along with their seven album releases and four DVDs, they have also released four "official bootleg" albums of their live recordings. Their most recent release "Live at the Leaf" chronicles a weekend in New Orleans playing at the legendary Maple Leaf. It was released in 2018.

== History ==
The core of Mr. Blotto is the brother songwriting team of Mike and Paul Bolger, who had played together in garage rock bands throughout high school. They went in separate directions musically when they attended different colleges, Mike leaning towards the hardcore punk stylings of Hüsker Dü, and Paul focusing on the resurgence of 70s rock like Aerosmith, while eventually discovering Crosby, Stills and Nash and the Grateful Dead, who would later become huge influences. After Paul graduated he decided to pursue the life of a full-time musician while Mike opted to become a lawyer. Paul landed a gig as the house singer in a Polish club in Chicago called "The Cardinal Club." It was here that Paul met guitarist Bob Georges and they decided to begin playing together.

Earlier the Bolger brothers played in the 1980s in a group called Fred, alongside future members of the Freddy Jones Band.

Paul and Bob found drummer Alan Baster at a jazz night, and hired him on. After several auditions for a bass player yielded no results, Paul convinced Mike to be an interim bass player. The band as a four-piece started hitting Chicago area open mic nights and outlying bars, developing their roots-oriented jamband sound and weaving a large number of reworked Grateful Dead songs into their sets to supplement the originals being penned by Paul, Mike and Bob. As their audience grew, Mike quit being a lawyer and became a full-fledged member.

They released Parking Karma and found their way into the larger bars and venues of the Chicago scene. After the album was released, Dave Allen - an old college bandmate of Paul's - joined on keyboards, filling out the bass-acoustic guitar-electric guitar-keyboards-drums ensemble that has remained consistent through personnel changes since.

In addition to Piano, Synths, & Hammond B-3, Dave supplied another singing voice and an ability to improvise lyrics that complemented a long-standing element of the early Blotto show, the "Reggae Rap," in which Paul would freestyle over a rock-steady type of beat.

In the mid-90s, they released a second CD, "Bad Hair Day," and continued their process of steadily playing shows in the Chicago area. By the end of the decade they had built their audience to the point that they were a significant draw at local performances and festivals.

1998 saw a third CD, Ancient Face; in 1999 Bob Georges was replaced by Mark Hague. The introduction of Mark (who had played with the Freddy Jones Band) marked a creative period for the band, and he helped pen the next generation of Mr. Blotto tunes. Paul, Mark & Mike started meeting every Monday to work on new original ideas. In these sessions, any idea would be chased down and put to tape. These songs became Cabbages and Kings, the 4th CD which (93.1) WXRT called the band's best release yet.

Around this time, the band addressed the constant demand for a Live Record. Mr. Blotto had been, from its inception, an improvisational band and had always allowed people to record the shows. A taper path was built that included an analog-to-digital converter, a distribution amplifier, and an open invitation for all to enjoy the high quality of a constant gain board patch in either digital or analog. As a result, clean Mr. Blotto boots began to cross the country, often in advance of the band—this is especially true outside of the Midwest, where they rarely tour.

Seeing as not everyone had a portable CD burner or DAT, Mr. Blotto began issuing Live Shows and Compilations. The Bootleg Series is a single CD of songs handpicked by the band for their unique characteristics, where the Just Did It series is made up of double-disc sets from one particular show or run of shows.

In 2005, Alan Baster left the band....and Mr. Blotto picked up a drummer from Indiana by the name of Tony Dellumo. Shortly thereafter Paul, Mark, Mike, Tony and Dave started in on a new album that was finished spring 2006. With help of the Grateful Dead lyricist John Perry Barlow, Mr. Blotto released their 5th studio album: "Barlow Shanghai."

When Dave "B3" Allen had to leave the band at the end of 2005, Mr. Blotto hired on another well-established musician in the Northwest Indiana music scene by the name of Steve Ball. Steve Ball is best known in Northwest Indiana and the Chicago music scene as not only a keyboard player, but also a guitar, bass, mandolin and harmonica journeyman.

In 2007, the group released an album jointly written with John Perry Barlow, who had previously worked as a lyricist with the Grateful Dead.

In 2009, Mr. Blotto played the Wakarusa festival and co-headlined the Little Turtle Music & Arts festival in Indiana alongside Los Lobos and The Willie Waldman Project.

Alan Baster returned as drummer in July 2009. Tony Dellumo left to drum with the band Chester Brown.

On May 29, 2013, the band announced that June 21, 2013 is the official release date for the new studio album, "Thread". The new album will contain 14 original songs, and will be available on-line and at the official CD Release Show at Martyr's in Chicago, IL

=== Origins of the band name Mr. Blotto ===
During a band interview with Planet 19 Media Productions, Mike and Paul described the origins of the name Mr. Blotto:

Mike: "We used to put "Mr." before things. It was like putting "est" at the end of something, so, uh, "I'm Mr. Thirsty, I gotta get something to drink", that kind of thing."

Paul: "We were at a Dead show and we were sideways and we said "I'm Mr. Blotto today" and thought it was funny."

== Tapers ==
Mr. Blotto allows fans to record performances from the soundboard and many of these recordings can be heard at www.archive.org. 638 shows have been archived as of summer 2013. The oldest show being 5-29-1993.

== Blottopia ==
The group hosted a yearly festival in Northern Illinois called Blottopia until 2018. Blottopia was a two-day camping festival held in July. The Festival was held along the Fox River at Vasa Park in Elgin, Illinois. from 2000 until 2011. The band has played a surprise album for the final encore on the second night since Blottopia II.

The 2012 Blottopia was held at Iron Horse in Sabula, Iowa.

From 2013 to 2015, Blottopia has been held at the Hideaway Lakes Campground in Yorkville, Illinois, once again on the Fox River.

The 2016 festival was held at Wardawgs Paintball in Holiday Hills, IL.

The 2017 festival moved yet again to Who Else Land in Dixon, IL.

Previous encores at Blottopia have included:

- 2000: NO ALBUM - there was a movie in the barn afterwards
- 2001: The Dark Side of the Moon by Pink Floyd
- 2002: The Doors by The Doors
- 2003: Led Zeppelin II by Led Zeppelin
- 2004: Who's Next by The Who
- 2005: Some Girls by The Rolling Stones
- 2006: Terrapin Station by The Grateful Dead
- 2007: Gamehendge by Phish
- 2008: Babylon by Bus by Bob Marley and the Wailers
- 2009: Stop Making Sense by Talking Heads
- 2010: Sgt. Pepper's Lonely Hearts Club Band by The Beatles
- 2011: Toys in the Attic by Aerosmith
- 2012: Eat a Peach by The Allman Brothers Band
- 2013: Sex Machine by James Brown
- 2014: Animals by Pink Floyd
- 2015: Physical Graffiti by Led Zeppelin
- 2016: Boston (album) by Boston
- 2017: At Fillmore East by The Allman Brothers Band

== The Wire ==
Mr. Blotto singer Paul Bolger became an investor in the "Wire, a venue, school and recording space described as an incubator for musical ideas." The Wire was located in Berwyn on Roosevelt Road, two blocks from the famous nightclub Fitzgeralds, in an area that promises to become a music "destination", with dining and entertainment close by. Mr. Blotto performed concerts at the venue numerous times. The Wire closed in March 2020.

== Members ==
Current

- Paul Bolger - Lead Vocals & Acoustic Guitar
- Mark Hague - Lead Guitar & Vocals
- Mike Bolger - Bass & Vocals
- Alan Baster - Drums
- Steve Ball - Hammond B-3, Keyboards, Mandolin, Harmonica & Vocals

Former

- Tony Dellumo - Drums
- Dave "B3" Allen - Keyboards & Vocals (occasionally still performs with band)
- Bob Georges - Lead Guitar

== Discography ==
- Parking Karma, 1992
- Bad Hair Day, 1994
- Ancient Face, 1998
- Just Did It Live At The Vic Theatre, 1999
- Bootleg Series #1, 2000
- Cabbages and Kings, 2001
- Bad Hair Decade, 2004
- Barlow Shanghai, 2006
- Blottopia VII DVD, 2007
- Just Did It III (Live), 2009
- Blottopia IX - Babylon by Bus Encore DVD, 2009
- Blottopia VIII DVD, 2011
- Blottopia IX DVD, 2011
- Just Did It IV Blottumnal EQ (Live), 2012
- Thread, 2013
- Rules of the Road (EP), 2016
