= Folktales (album) =

Studio album by The Big Wu
- Released: October 17, 2000
- Genre: Rock and Roll, Jam band
- Label: Phoenix Rising
- Producer: Jeff Roberts

The Big Wu chronology
Live at the Fitzgerald (2000)	Folktales (2000)	3/13/98 Cedar Cultural Centre (2001)

Professional ratings
Review scores
Source	Rating
Allmusic	3/5 stars

Folktales is the second studio album released by the rock and roll jam band The Big Wu.

== Track listing ==
1. "Angie O'Plasty"
2. "Minnesota Moon"
3. "Boxing Day"
4. "Two Person Chair"
5. "Oxygen"
6. "Elani"
7. "Kensington Manor"
8. "House of Wu"
9. "S.O.S."
10. "Shantytown"
