= The Big Wu =

American jam band

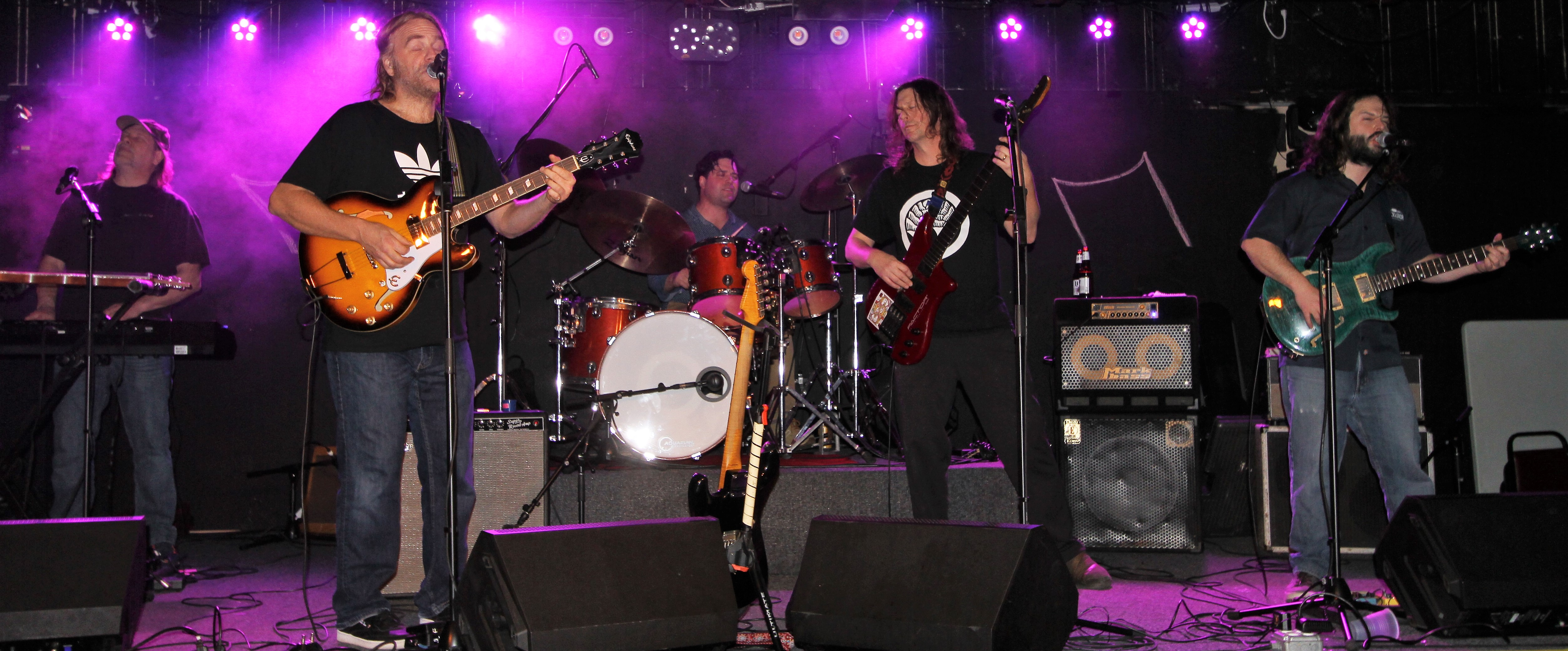
- The Big Wu in 2017

Background information
- Origin: Northfield, Minnesota, United States
- Genres: Rock, jazz fusion, progressive rock, jam band
- Years active: 1992–present
- Labels: Phoenix Rising, BIVCO Records, Oarfin Records
- Members: Chris Castino (guitar/vocals); Andy Miller (bass); Terry VanDeWalker (drums/vocals); Al Oikari (keyboards); Mark Joseph Grundhoefer (guitar/vocals)
- Past members: Jason Fladager (1992–2002); Chip House; Andrew Eklund; Nathan Eklund

The Big Wu is a rock jam band from Minnesota. The group is composed of Al Oikari, Andy Miller, Chris Castino, Mark Joseph Grundhoefer, and Terry VanDeWalker. The band made a mark on the jam band scene with a reputation for hook-oriented songwriting and as one of the earliest jam bands from the Midwest to achieve some national success. Relentless touring in the late 1990s and early 2000s built a loyal fan base that call themselves "family", many of whom get together for the band's recurring music festival, the Big Wu Family Reunion. From 1998–2006, the band annually held the Family Reunion on Memorial Weekend, and they frequently hold a Wu Years Eve event on December 31. The band has not toured extensively since the end of 2006, instead playing periodic shows in their home state of Minnesota and other nearby states.

== History ==
The Big Wu was founded in 1992 at St. Olaf College by students Castino and VanDeWalker along with Jason Fladager (guitar, vocals). Andrew Eklund (bass), Nathan Eklund (Keyboards; formerly with Kubla Khan, Virginia Circle, and The Stretch), and drummer Chip House.

During the 2002 Harvest Festival at Harmony Park Music Garden in Geneva Minnesota, the Big Wu played two nights. The first was guitarist Fladager's last show. A few days later the band announced that Fladager had left the band, which became a four-piece. Fladager started his own band called God Johnson.

== Albums ==
Title	Date of Official Release	Label
Tracking Buffalo Through the Bathtub	September 12, 1997	Phoenix Rising
Welcome to the Family, Baby!	October 1999	Phoenix Rising
Live at the Fitzgerald	Memorial Day Weekend, 2000	Phoenix Rising
Folktales	October 17, 2000	Phoenix Rising
3/13/98 Cedar Cultural Centre	Memorial Day Weekend, 2001	BIVCO Records
Spring Reverb	November 2, 2002	Oarfin Records
Tool for Evening	Memorial Day Weekend, 2004	Oarfin Records
2/2/03 Atwood Ballroom	September 19, 2006	Oarfin Records
Folktales for the Bloodshot(iTunes only)	2011	
We Are Young, We Are Old	April 3, 2018	

== Videos ==
Date Recorded	Date of Official Release	Title	Recording Location	Medium
May 24 and 25th, 2003	2006	Family Reunion #6	Black River Falls, Wisconsin (live performance)	DVD

== Documentary ==
The Big Wu Way premiered April 9, 2016 as part of the 35th annual Minneapolis St. Paul International Film Festival.
