= 10 Foot Ganja Plant =

American musical group

10 Ft. Ganja Plant
- Origin: Boston, Massachusetts, U.S.
- Genres: Reggae; Dub; Roots reggae
- Years active: 1999–present
- Label: ROIR

10 Ft. Ganja Plant is a roots/dub Reggae group primarily based in Boston, Massachusetts.

10 Ft. Ganja Plant often places no personnel credits on any of their albums. Most of their music has a traditional reggae sound, but their musical styles vary.

== Discography ==
- 10 ft. Ganja Plant 7" [I-Town, 1999]
- Mang Studio All-Stars 7" [I-Town, 1999]
- Presents [ROIR, 1999]
- Hillside Airstrip [ROIR, 2001]
- Midnight Landing [ROIR, 2003]
- Bass Chalice [ROIR, 2005]
- Presents (re-release of 1999 album with 2 bonus tracks) [ROIR, 2007]
- Bush Rock [ROIR, 2009]
- Essential 10 Ft Ganja Plant [ROIR, 2009]
- 10 Deadly Shots, Vol. 1 [ROIR, 2010]
- Shake Up The Place [ROIR, 2011]
- 10 Deadly Shots, Vol. II [ROIR, 2012]
- Skycatcher [ROIR, 2013]
- 10 Deadly Shots, Vol. III [ROIR, 2014]
