= Freddy Jones Band =

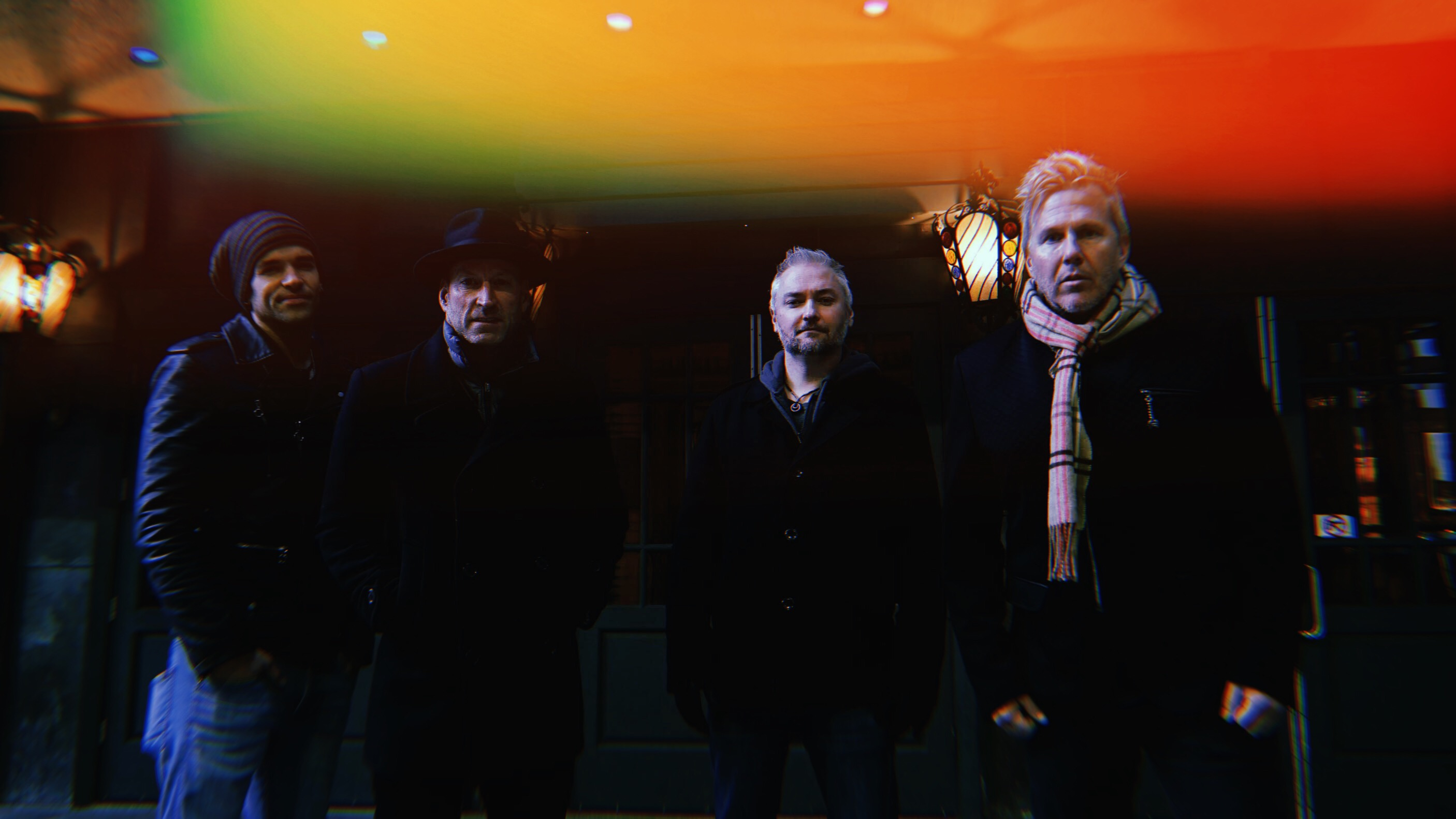
- Freddy Jones Band in 2018

Background information
- Origin: Chicago, Illinois, U.S.
- Genres: Roots rock, blues rock
- Years active: 1990–present
- Labels: Capricorn, PolyGram, Dustimmoff Music Partnership

The Freddy Jones Band is a roots rock band from Chicago, Illinois. Band members have cited as their influences Duane Allman, Eric Clapton, Little Feat, Mark Knopfler, and Bob Dylan. Despite the band's name, none of the bandmembers is named Freddy Jones; according to a 1992 interview, guitarist Wayne Healy stated it was "inspired by a big fat comic strip character named Freddy."

== History ==
The Chicago Tribune stated that the band was founded in 1990. Wayne Healy and Marty Lloyd, who grew up together, began playing with high school classmate Jim Bonaccorsi while all three attended Holy Cross College near South Bend, Indiana. According to Rolling Stone, Marty Lloyd and Wayne Healy were also college students at Loyola University in Chicago. Healy and Lloyd were the band's principal songwriters; by 1991, in addition to occasional songwriter Rob Bonaccorsi, the band had been filled out as a five-piece by the addition of Jim Bonaccorsi and Simon Horrocks. Their self-titled debut was released independently and then by Capricorn Records followed by Waiting for the Night (1993), North Avenue Wake Up Call (1995), and Lucid (1997). Their song "In A Daydream" peaked at #27 on the Mainstream Rock Chart in September 1994. In 1998, bassist Jim Bonaccorsi and guitar/vocalist Rob Bonaccorsi left the band and were replaced by bassist Mark Murphy. Due to tensions between founding members Marty Lloyd and Wayne Healy, the group splintered in the winter of 2000, after having recorded an album with producer David Baerwald that was never issued. Lloyd toured as the Marty Lloyd Band in 2000 with a group of musicians drawn from previous iterations of the Freddy Jones Band as well as members of Chicago group Sonia Dada. The original line up returned in 2005, doing shows in Chicago, Milwaukee and other Midwestern cities. After two live albums and a compilation album, their next studio album, Never Change, appeared in 2015.

On April 3rd, 2026, during NASA's Artemis II mission, the 4 astronauts aboard the Orion spacecraft woke up to the band's most popular song, "In a Daydream". This song was chosen by commander Reid Wiseman as one of the several wake up songs the crew woke up to during their nearly 10 day mission around the moon.

== Discography ==
- The Freddy Jones Band (Poor Boys, 1992; re-released with bonus material, 1994)
- Waiting for the Night (Capricorn, 1993)
- North Avenue Wake Up Call (Capricorn, 1995) US #186
- Lucid (PolyGram, 1997)
- Mile High Live (Capricorn, 1999)
- High Spirits (Sony Special Products, 2006; compilation 1993–1995)
- Time Well Wasted (2009; live plus three new studio tracks)
- The Freddy Jones Band (Volcano, 2011) eight studio and three live tracks
- Never Change (Dustimmoff, 2015)

== Band members ==
=== Current members ===
- Marty Lloyd – lead vocals, guitar
- Rich Ross – bass, backing vocals
- Ben Loshin - Drums
- Rockwell Jacobs – Guitar, backing vocals

=== Former members ===
- Jim Bonaccorsi – bass
- Rob Bonaccorsi – vocals, guitar
- Simon Horrocks – drums
- Wayne Healy – vocals, guitar
- Jeff Duffy – drums
- Mark Murphy – bass
- Al Zorn – keyboards
- Scott Larned -keyboards
- John Sabey – bass
- Dale Robin Tulk – drums
- Ryan MacMillan – drums
- Robert S. Miller – drums
- Dave Preston – guitar
- Matthew Moon – guitar, lap steel, vocals
- Glen Kimberlin – bass, vocals
- Renn Anderson – guitar, vocals
- Jason Litwin - Percussion
- Larry Beers - Drums
- Greg “Goose” LaPoint - Drums
- Terry Goldstein - Guitar, Vocals
