= Particle (band) =

American music group

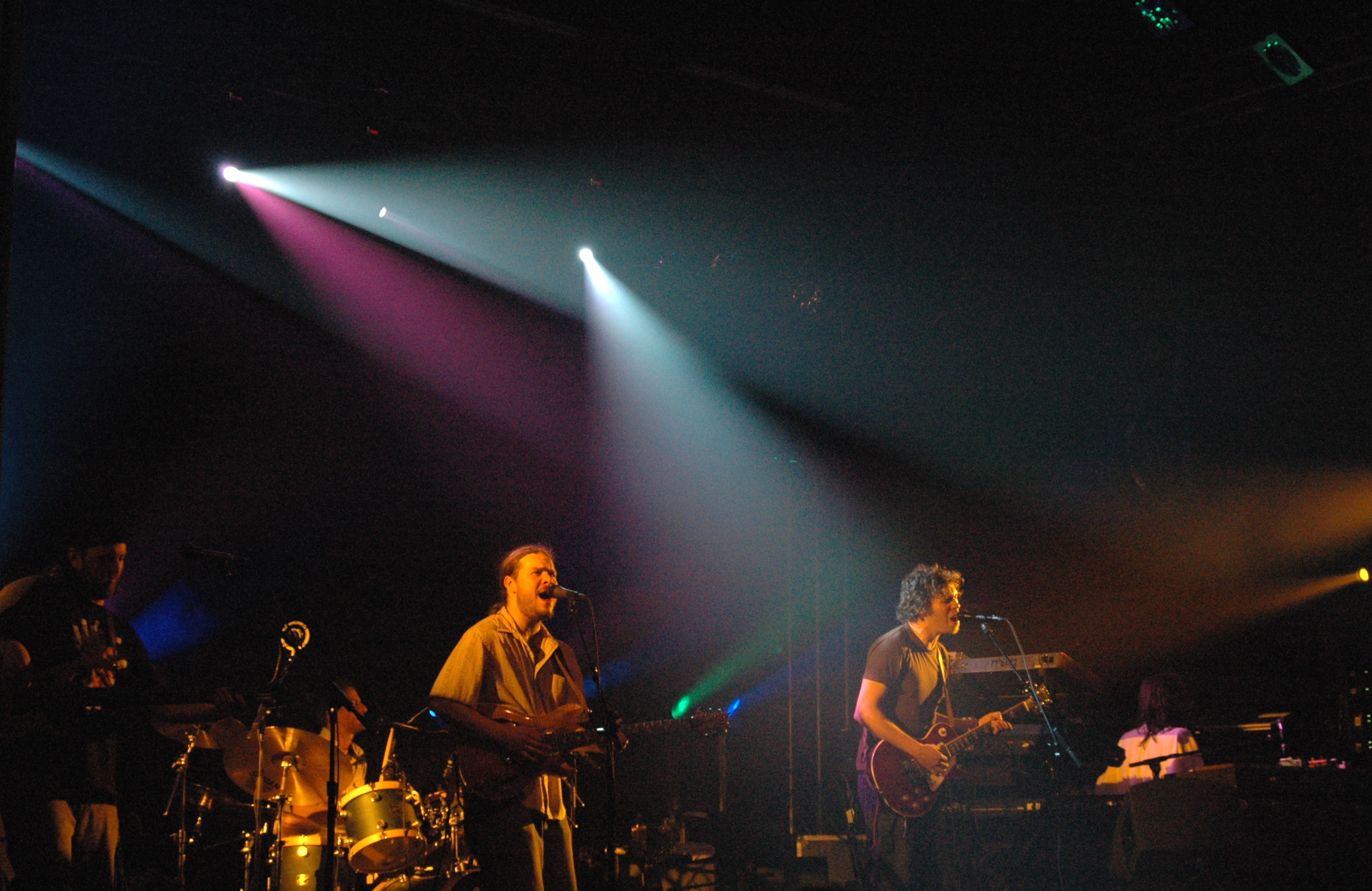
- Particle performing in 2006

Background information
- Origin: Los Angeles, California, United States
- Genres: Rock, progressive rock, jam rock, electronica, funktronica, livetronica
- Years active: 2000–present
- Members: Steve Molitz: keys, synths, vocals Mike Daum: guitar, vocals Clay Parnell: bass Kito Bovenschulte: drums
- Past members: Dave Simmons; Ben Combe; Eric Gould; Darren Pujalet; Charlie Hitchcock; Brandon Draper; Scott Metzger
- Website: www.particlepeople.com

Particle is an American rock band formed in Los Angeles in 2000.

== History ==
The band formed in 2000 and the original members were Dave Simmons (guitar), Steve Molitz (keyboard), Eric Gould (bass), and Darren Pujalet (drums). Simmons died shortly after the formation of the band due to a sudden illness. Guitarist Charlie Hitchcock joined shortly thereafter. Along with The Disco Biscuits, Sound Tribe Sector 9, and Lotus, the group was among the first to blend rock, jazz, funk, and electronica into the milieu of what has been dubbed livetronica (a subgenre of the jam-band movement where live bands blend the structures of DJ-produced sequenced electronic music into a more traditional live band setting). Prior to 2006, the band's repertoire consisted entirely of instrumental material.

The group made a name for itself and built an enthusiastic fan base, known as Particle People, by performing energetic late-night sets at festivals such as Bonnaroo, where they played a set of over five hours to 20,000 people. They played up to 140 shows a year, often to large audiences. Reliance on word of mouth from fans, rather than advertising, allowed this group to sell out venues such as the Bowery Ballroom in New York City before they finally released their much-anticipated first album, Launchpad, in early 2004, on which they worked with producer Tom Rothrock. In April and May 2005 the group toured with former Grateful Dead drummer Mickey Hart as Hydra; the tour received mixed reviews from many Deadheads who were unaccustomed to Particle's electronic-based approach. Bassist Phil Lesh, also of the Grateful Dead, sat in with the band that summer.

They followed Launchpad with the EP Launchpad Remixes, featuring tracks from the album remixed by members of Groove Armada and Sugar Daddy. In 2005 the band toured Europe for the first time.

Following their performance on the Xingolati Cruise in late 2005 the band dismissed Hitchcock from the group. This was a source of controversy in the months that followed, because the band's website stated that the departure was a mutual decision. Hitchcock, however, vehemently disagreed and went public by stating that he was summarily fired and was never able to overcome a "hired hand" stigma from the other bandmembers despite joining a mere six performances after the group's formation.

Replacing Hitchcock were Ben Combe and Scott Metzger on guitars and vocals. Their first two performance with the group in February 2006 was recorded, filmed, and released as Transformations: Live for the People that July. Featuring guest appearances by experimental rap duo Blackalicious, Robby Krieger of The Doors, guitarist Joe Satriani, and DJ Logic, the album showcased the band exploring vocal-based music as well as incorporating more overt rock and hip hop influences.

In late July 2006 Scott Metzger had to leave Particle due to a family emergency that required his long-term attention.

In October 2007 Ben Combe announced his departure from Particle and pursued a Biotech degree until April 2012. A July 2008 side project, PUJA, brought together Combe and Darren Pujalet of Particle, as well as Melvin Seals of the Jerry Garcia Band and Cristian Basso of Leo Nocentelli and Little Hercules.

In 2008 Molitz also played in the supergroup Agents of Mayhem.

Particle shows since 2008 have featured Josh Clark of Tea Leaf Green, Michael Kang of The String Cheese Incident, Dan Lebowitz of Animal Liberation Orchestra, Lucas Bingham of Free Band Radio, Pete Wall (sax) of The Motet, and former Particle members Ben Combe and Charlie Hitchcock.

== Musical style ==
The band is regarded as a jam band with progressive rock roots. They have described their music as "space porn funk", a term coined by one of their early fans, and "funktronic". Allmusic writer Hal Horowitz, reviewing Launchpad, described their music as having "a loose '70s feel that mixes elements of Pink Floyd's prog rock and Return to Forever-styled jazz fusion with insistent dance beats that shift from funk to near disco". Philip Booth, reviewing Launchpad for CMJ New Music Monthly, described their music as "fusion in the non-jazz sense", commenting on the "trance, house, and drum 'n' bass rhythms heard throughout", and calling the album an "unstoppable blast of gritty electronic jam". A review by Nicole Keiper in The Tennessean described the band's sound as "jam-rock standards that make smart use of dance music's lush textures and well-placed, good-and-solid dancefloor thumps". Chris Nelson of The New York Times described them as "disco-flavored, instrumental jam music".

== Discography ==
=== Albums ===
- Launchpad (2004), Or Music
- Transformations Live For The People (2006), Shout! Factory
- Live at Wanee Festival 2012 (2012), MunckMix
- Accelerator (2018), Particle Records

=== Videos ===
- Transformations Live For The People (2006) (DVD-V), Shout! Factory

=== Singles ===
- "The Track Inside" (February 3, 2004 United States)
- Launchpad Remixes (November 9, 2004 United States)
