= Dream (Keller Williams album) =

Studio album by Keller Williams
- Released: February 6, 2007
- Recorded: October–December 2006
- Genre: Rock
- Length: 73:00
- Label: SCI Fidelity Records
- Producer: Keller Williams

Keller Williams chronology
Grass (2006)	Dream (2007)	12 (2007)

Professional ratings
Review scores
Source	Rating
AllMusic	3.5/5 stars

Dream is the ninth solo album from Keller Williams, released in 2007. With the help of numerous collaborators, Williams explores a wide spectrum of musical genres in each of the songs.

The album ranked number 4 on Billboard's Top Heatseekers chart in 2007, and the song Cadillac won the Jammy award for Song of the Year in 2008.

== Track listing ==
All tracks by Keller Williams except where noted.

1. "Play This" – 2:55
2. "Celebrate Your Youth" (Timothy Kobza, John Molo, Bobby Read, Williams) – 3:52 with Modereko and John D'Earth
3. "Cadillac" – 4:32 with Bob Weir
4. "Ninja of Love" – 5:34 with Michael Franti
5. "Kiwi and the Apricot" – 5:01 with Charlie Hunter
6. "People Watchin' " – 5:14 with Bela Fleck, Victor Wooten, and Jeff Sipe
7. "Cookies" – 4:51 (Fareed Haque, Williams) with Fareed Haque
8. "Rainy Day" – 5:30 with Martin Sexton
9. "Sing for my Dinner" – 5:09 with The String Cheese Incident
10. "Restraint" – 4:11
11. "Life" – 3:57
12. "Twinkle" (Steve Kimock, Molo, Williams) – 7:40 with Steve Kimock and John Molo
13. "Got No Feathers" – 5:10 with John Scofield, Victor Wooten, and Jeff Sipe
14. "Slo Mo Balloon" – 4:34 with Fleming McWilliams and Charlie Hunter
15. "Lil' Sexy Blues" – 3:34 with Sanjay Mishra and Samir Chatterjee
16. "Bendix / Dance Hippie" (Williams, Ella Mae Williams) – 1:08 with Ella Williams

== Personnel ==
- John Molo – drums
- John "J.T." Thomas – keyboards
- Victor Wooten – bass
- Bobby Read – clarinet, engineer, mixing, flute, saxophone
- Jim Watts – engineer
- Sanjay Mishra – classical guitar
- Samir Chatterjee – tabla
- Jeff Covert – guitar, drums, voices, vocals, editing, mixing, talk box, engineer
- Louis Gosain – engineer
- Michael Travis – mandolin, drums
- Martin Sexton – acoustic guitar, percussion, trumpet, vocals, vocal percussion, guitar
- Scott Hull – mastering
- John Painter – engineer
- Jon Altschiller – engineer, mixing
- Fleming McWilliams – vocals
- Jason Hann – percussion
- Mark Berger – design, layout design
- Dave Chalfant – bass, engineer, mixing
- Michael Kang – mandolin
- Keith Moseley – bass
- Bill Nershi – acoustic guitar
- Keller Williams – organ, banjo, bass, percussion, acoustic guitar, electric guitar, baritone guitar, 12 string electring guitar, editing, fretless bass, producer, 12 string acoustic guitar, human whistle, voices, vocals, theremin
- Kyle Hollingsworth – keyboards
- Jeff Sipe – drums
- Zac Rae – keyboards, optigan
- Derrek Phillips – drums, tambourine
- Roberto Battaglia – engineer
- Nadia Prescher – management
- Jack Mascari – engineer
- Mike McGinn – engineer
- Noel White – percussion, drums, engineer
- Scott Cresswell – engineer
- Jeremy D'Antonio – assistant Engineer
- Sandy Loeber – artwork, Photography
- Christine Stauder – management
- Jackson Hamlet Weir "Bob's Dog" – vocals
- John D'earth – trumpet
- Béla Fleck – banjo, engineer
- Michael Franti – vocals, voices, engineer
- Charlie Hunter – guitar, 8 string guitar
- Steve Kimock – electric guitar
- Tim Kobza – guitar
- Bob Weir – acoustic guitar, vocals, foot stomping, voices (His dog is barking in background of Cadillac)
- Fareed Haque – guitar, engineer, percussion, electric guitar
- John Scofield – guitar
