= A String Cheese Incident =

Live album by the String Cheese Incident
- Released: June 1997
- Recorded: February 27, 1997
- Venue: Fox Theatre (Boulder, Colorado)
- Genre: Jam; jazz fusion; progressive bluegrass; progressive rock
- Length: 72:31
- Label: SCI Fidelity
- Producer: The String Cheese Incident

The String Cheese Incident chronology
| Born on the Wrong Planet (1997) | A String Cheese Incident (1997) | 'Round the Wheel (1998) |

Professional ratings
Review scores
| Source | Rating |
|---|---|
| AllMusic | 3/5 stars |

A String Cheese Incident is the second release and first live album of Colorado-based jam band the String Cheese Incident. The album chronicles a single concert from the Fox Theatre in Boulder, Colorado on February 27, 1997, and is the first to feature pianist Kyle Hollingsworth as part of the group. This album is widely considered the best CD for new converts to listen to in order to become acquainted to the band's live sound.

== Track listing ==
1. "Lonesome Fiddle Blues" (Vassar Clements) – 9:58
2. "Little Hands" (Bill Nershi) – 8:16
3. "Dudley's Kitchen" (Bill Nershi) – 3:02
4. "Rhythm of the Road" (Bill Nershi) – 6:08
5. "How Mountain Girls Can Love" (Stanley Brothers) – 2:56
6. "Pirates" (Michael Kang) – 9:27
7. "Wake Up" (Bill Nershi) – 7:05
8. "Land's End" (Tim O'Brien) – 12:00
9. "San Jose" (Michael Kang, Bill Nershi) – 8:53
10. "Walk This Way" (Joe Perry, Steven Tyler) – 4:46

== Credits ==
=== The String Cheese Incident ===
- Bill Nershi – Acoustic guitar
- Keith Moseley – Bass guitar
- Kyle Hollingsworth – Accordion, keyboards
- Michael Kang– Mandolin, Violin
- Michael Travis – drums
- Sam Lauber - Flute

=== Production ===
- Kevin Clock – Mixing Engineer, Mastering
- Steve McNamara – Mastering
- The String Cheese Incident – Producer
- Jay Sayler – Recording Engineer
- Austin Shaw – Cover Design, Cover Art
- Jon OLeary – Co-mixing Engineer, Producer
