= Untying the Not =

Studio album by the String Cheese Incident
- Released: September 23, 2003
- Studio: Sound City
- Genre: Neo-psychedelia, jam, folk rock
- Label: SCI Fidelity
- Producer: The String Cheese Incident, Martin Glover

The String Cheese Incident chronology
Outside Inside (2001)	Untying the Not (2003)	One Step Closer (2005)

Professional ratings
Review scores
Source	Rating
Allmusic	4.5/5 stars

Untying the Not is the sixth release and fourth studio album of Colorado-based jam band the String Cheese Incident. The album deviates from their previous rock and bluegrass sounds and shows heavy influence from guest producer Martin Glover. Untying the Not is much darker than the band's previous lighthearted studio releases, full of minor keys and introspection on topics such as death, which are most clearly evidenced in the tracks "Elijah" and "Mountain Girl." It also shows significant evidence of the band's recent habit of introducing techno and trance elements into the mix, such as on the track "Valley of the Jig", which is a fusion of techno and bluegrass stylings.

== Track listing ==
1. "Wake Up" (Bill Nershi) - 5:46
2. "Sirens" (Keith Moseley) - 5:07
3. "Looking Glass" (John Greer, Bill Nershi) - 5:44
4. "Orion's Belt [Instrumental]" (Bill Nershi) - 2:50
5. "Mountain Girl [Instrumental]" (The String Cheese Incident, Martin Glover) - 4:57
6. "Lonesome Road Blues [Instrumental]" (Traditional) - 1:24
7. "Elijah [Instrumental]" (Kyle Hollingsworth) - 2:41
8. "Valley of the Jig" (Traditional) - 4:03
9. "Tinder Box" (John Perry Barlow, Christina Callicott, Michael Kang) - 4:24
10. "Just Passin' Through" (John Perry Barlow, Bill Nershi) - 4:46
11. "Who Am I?" (Kyle Hollingsworth, Michaels) - 4:23
12. "Time Alive" (Michael Travis) - 5:11
13. "On My Way" (Kyle Hollingsworth) - 3:02

== Credits ==
=== The String Cheese Incident ===
- Bill Nershi – acoustic guitar, Slide Guitar, Lap Steel Guitar
- Keith Moseley – Bass guitar, Harmonica, vocals
- Kyle Hollingsworth - Accordion, Organ, Piano, Synthesizer, Mellotron. vocals
- Michael Kang– Mandolin, Violin, vocals
- Michael Travis – percussion, drums, vocals
- Jason Hann - Drums, percussion

=== Additional personnel ===
- Kenny Brooks - Saxophone
- Chet Helms - Spoken Word
- Carolyn Garcia - Spoken Word
- Gary The Cab Driver - Spoken Word
- Michael Gosney - Spoken Word
- Julia Butterfly Hill - Spoken Word
- Aly Itzaina - Spoken Word
- Richard MacLaury - Spoken Word
- Rock Raffa - Spoken Word

=== Production ===
- Youth - Arranger, Engineer, Artwork, Producer
- Clive Goddard - Engineer
- Stephen Marcussen - Mastering
- Rail Jon Rogut - Digital Editing
- Michael Travis - Arranger
- Kenny Brooks - Guest Appearance
- Mike Cresswell - Digital Editing
- Chet Helms - Guest Appearance
- The String Cheese Incident - Arranger
- Michael Kang - Arranger
- Keith Moseley - Arranger
- Bill Nershi - Arranger
- Kyle Hollingsworth - Arranger
- Alex Grey - Cover Art
- Carolyn Garcia - Guest Appearance
- Gary The Cab Driver - Guest Appearance
- Michael Gosney - Guest Appearance
- Julia Butterfly Hill - Guest Appearance
- April Itzaina - Guest Appearance
- Richard MacLaury - Guest Appearance
- Adam Pickard - Engineer
- Rock Raffa - Guest Appearance
