= Song in My Head =

Studio album by the String Cheese Incident
- Released: April 29, 2014
- Genre: Jam band
- Length: 54:49
- Label: SCI Fidelity
- Producer: Jerry Harrison

The String Cheese Incident chronology
One Step Closer (2005)	Song in My Head (2014)	Believe (2017)

Song in My Head is an album by Colorado-based jam band the String Cheese Incident. Their first album in nine years, it was released on April 29, 2014.

== Critical reception ==
AllMusic said, "Though some of this material dates back a decade and has been vigorously road tested, it has never been previously recorded.... Nonetheless, SCI fans – and make no mistake, that's exactly who this record is for – will likely be delighted that despite studio economy, the band manages to retain its live energy in the studio even as it grows musically."

Grateful Web wrote, "Song in My Head is pure Cheese, and stands as easily one of their best albums of their career thus far. The recordings capture the vibe just as they would sound on stage (with a few tweaks here and there of course)... Fans will be excited to get a new album that actually sounds like the band. And just like their incredible live performances, this release is a party from start to finish."

KURE said, "The String Cheese Incident is a band that sounds like what would happen if Phish, Béla Fleck and the Flecktones, and Return to Forever all got together and just jammed.... If you like bluegrass, jazz fusion, or jam bands and somehow haven't heard of the String Cheese Incident yet, I recommend checking them out."

== Track listing ==
No.	Title	Writer(s)	Length
1.	"Colorado Bluebird Sky"	Bill Nershi, Jillian Nershi	6:28
2.	"Betray the Dark"	Michael Kang, Raul Malo	6:46
3.	"Let's Go Outside"	Kyle Hollingsworth	4:17
4.	"Song in My Head"	Kyle Hollingsworth, Michael Kang, Bill Nershi, Keith Moseley, Scott Law, Michael Travis	5:37
5.	"Struggling Angel"	Kyle Hollingsworth, Michael Kang, Bill Nershi, Keith Moseley, Michael Travis	5:36
6.	"Can't Wait Another Day"	Kyle Hollingsworth	5:03
7.	"So Far from Home"	Kyle Hollingsworth, Michael Kang, Bill Nershi, Keith Moseley, Michael Travis	3:55
8.	"Rosie"	Kyle Hollingsworth, Michael Kang, Bill Nershi, Keith Moseley, Michael Travis	5:51
9.	"Stay Through"	Kyle Hollingsworth, Michael Kang, Bill Nershi, Keith Moseley, Michael Travis, Jim Lauderdale	4:06
10.	"Colliding"	Kyle Hollingsworth, Michael Kang, Bill Nershi, Keith Moseley, Michael Travis	7:10
Total length:			54:49

Special Edition Bonus Tracks
No.	Title	Length
11.	"Colorado Bluebird Sky" (Featuring Zac Brown Band)	6:30
12.	"Can't Wait Another Day" (feat. Karl Denson and Chris Littlefield, live 2013-12-28 Broomfield, CO)	9:00
13.	"Rosie" (feat. Antibalas Horns, live 2013-10-31 Live Oak, FL)	6:30
Total length:		79:46

== Personnel ==
The String Cheese Incident

- Bill Nershi – guitar, vocals
- Michael Kang – guitar, mandolin, violin, vocals
- Kyle Hollingsworth – keyboards, vocals
- Keith Moseley – bass guitar, harmonica, vocals
- Michael Travis – drums
- Jason Hann – percussion, vocals

Additional musicians

- Chris Pandolfi – banjo

Production

- Produced by Jerry Harrison
- Eric "ET" Thorngren – engineering, mixing
- Ted Jensen – mastering
- Josh Harrier – cover art
