= One Step Closer (The String Cheese Incident album) =

Studio album by the String Cheese Incident
- Released: June 28, 2005
- Length: 53:12
- Label: SCI Fidelity
- Producer: The String Cheese Incident

The String Cheese Incident chronology
Untying the Not (2003)	One Step Closer (2005)	Song in My Head (2014)

Professional ratings
Review scores
Source	Rating
AllMusic	4/5 stars
Rolling Stone	3/5 stars

One Step Closer is the seventh release and fifth studio album of Colorado-based jam band the String Cheese Incident. Released in June 2005, and containing thirteen original tracks with guest songwriting collaborations, the album was produced by Malcolm Burn at a studio in Boulder, Colorado. One Step Closer was a return to the more roots-based music of earlier String Cheese Incident fare, while still retaining some of the pop sensibility of previous studio albums. It was also the first album to feature new member Jason Hann.

== Track listing ==
No.	Title	Writer(s)	Length
1.	"Give Me the Love"	John Perry Barlow; Malcolm Burn; Michael Kang	3:33
2.	"Sometimes a River"	Keith Moseley; Todd Sheaffer	5:20
3.	"Big Compromise"	Jim Lauderdale; Bill Nershi	4:26
4.	"Until the Music's Over"	Burn; Moseley; Sheaffer	4:48
5.	"Silence in Your Head"	Burn; Kyle Hollingsworth	3:40
6.	"Farther"	Lauderdale; Nershi	4:00
7.	"Drive"	Barlow; Hollingsworth; Kang	3:53
8.	"Betray the Dark"	Kang	2:28
9.	"45th of November"	Hollingsworth; Robert Hunter	4:26
10.	"One Step Closer"	Nershi	3:30
11.	"Rainbow Serpent"	Ina Grigorova; Michael Travis	3:57
12.	"Swampy Waters"	Grigorova; Travis	4:59
13.	"Brand New Start"	Lauderdale; Moseley	4:12
Total length:			53:12

- Bonus 30-minute DVD documentary The Big Compromise

== Credits ==
=== The String Cheese Incident ===
- Bill Nershi – acoustic guitar, vocals
- Keith Moseley – bass guitar, harmonica, electric guitar, vocals
- Kyle Hollingsworth – accordion, keyboards, vocals
- Michael Kang – mandolin, violin, viola, guitar, vocals
- Michael Travis – acoustic guitar, bass guitar, drums, vocals
- Jason Hann – percussion

=== Additional personnel ===
- Jim Watts – background vocals, E-bow
- Malcolm Burn – vocals

=== Production ===
- Malcolm Burn – producer, instrumentation
- Kevin Morris – management
- Dominick Maita – mastering engineer
- Jim Watts – engineer
- Jeremy D'Antonio – assistant engineer
- Jamie Janover – cover photo
- Jeremy Stein – management
- Mike Luba – management
- Jesse Aratow – management
- Nadia Prescher – management
- Breck Alan – vocal coach
