= 'Round the Wheel =

Studio album by the String Cheese Incident
- Released: August 11, 1998
- Genre: Jam; jazz fusion; progressive bluegrass; progressive rock
- Length: 55:12
- Label: SCI Fidelity
- Producer: The String Cheese Incident

The String Cheese Incident chronology
A String Cheese Incident (1997)	'Round the Wheel (1998)	'Carnival '99 (2000)

Professional ratings
Review scores
Source	Rating
Allmusic	3/5 stars

'Round the Wheel is the third release by Colorado-based jam band the String Cheese Incident, released in 1998. The album features guests Paul McCandless on soprano and tenor saxophone and Tony Furtado on banjo.

== Track listing ==
1. "Samba DeGreeley" (Michael Travis) – 0:42
2. "Come as You Are" (Michael Kang) – 6:38
3. "Restless Wind" (Bill Nershi) – 3:47
4. "On the Road" (Bill Nershi) – 3:55
5. "Road Home" (Bill Nershi) – 5:06
6. "Galactic" (Kyle Hollingsworth, Michael Kang) – 7:13
7. "100 Year Flood" (Bill Nershi) – 6:09
8. "MLT" (Kyle Hollingsworth) – 6:24
9. "Got What He Wanted" (Kyle Hollingsworth) – 4:27
10. "'Round the Wheel" (Bill Nershi) – 7:25
11. "Good Times Around the Bend" (Bill Nershi) – 3:26

== Credits ==
=== The String Cheese Incident ===
- Bill Nershi – Acoustic Guitar
- Keith Moseley – Bass guitar
- Kyle Hollingsworth – Accordion, Organ, Piano, Fender Rhodes
- Michael Kang– Mandolin, Violin
- Michael Travis – percussion, Conga, drums, Timbales, Diembe, Talking Drum

=== Additional Personnel ===
- Tony Furtado – Banjo
- Paul McCandless – Soprano Saxophone, Tenor Saxophone, Sopranino
- Christian Teal – percussion
- Yvonne Brown – Background Vocals
- Coco Brown – Background Vocals

=== Production ===
- Ken Love – Mastering
- James Tuttle – Engineer
- The String Cheese Incident – Producer
- Michael R. Everett – Cover Art
- Greg Heimbecker – Engineer
- Jon O'Leary – Producer
