= Outside Inside (The String Cheese Incident album) =

Studio album by the String Cheese Incident
- Released: May 15, 2001
- Genre: Jam band
- Label: SCI Fidelity
- Producer: The String Cheese Incident

The String Cheese Incident chronology
Carnival '99 (2000)	Outside Inside (2001)	Untying the Not (2003)

Professional ratings
Review scores
Source	Rating
Allmusic	link
Rolling Stone	Not rated link

Outside Inside is the fifth release and third studio album of Colorado-based jam band, the String Cheese Incident. Released in 2001, this album marked a shift from the band's traditional bluegrass leanings to a more standard rock sound, thus making it the most accessible album to a mainstream audience to that point. The band did not completely abandon its bluegrass roots, however, sneaking in the short three-minute track "Up the Canyon" at the end of the disc, which has become one of many live favorites along with "Rollover", "Close Your Eyes", and others.

== Track listing ==
1. "Outside and Inside" (Bill Nershi) – 4:42
2. "Joyful Sound" (Keith Moseley) – 6:28
3. "Close Your Eyes" (Kyle Hollingsworth) – 4:50
4. "Search" (Nershi, Ernest Randrianosolo) – 4:38
5. "Drifting" (Nershi) – 3:28
6. "Black and White" (Michael Kang, Dain Pape) – 6:11
7. "Lost" (Hollingsworth) – 4:50
8. "Latinissmo" (Hollingsworth) – 5:10
9. "Sing a New Song" (Nershi) – 4:41
10. "Rollover" (Kang, Pape) – 10:56
11. "Up the Canyon" (Kang, Moseley, Nershi) – 3:01

== Credits ==
=== The String Cheese Incident ===
- Bill Nershi – Acoustic Guitar
- Keith Moseley – Bass guitar
- Kyle Hollingsworth – Accordion, Organ, Piano, Synthesizer, Fender Rhodes
- Michael Kang– Mandolin, Violin
- Michael Travis – percussion, drums

=== Additional Personnel ===
- Andy Cleaves – Trumpet
- Karl Denson – Saxophone

=== Production ===
- Steve Berlin – Producer
- Dave McNair – Engineer
- Doug Sax – Mastering
- The String Cheese Incident – Arranger
- Bill Nershi – Arranger
- Robert Hadley – Mastering
- Todd Radunsky – Cover Photo
- Sophie Lynn Morris - Cover Model
