= Breathe (Keller Williams album) =

Studio album by Keller Williams & the String Cheese Incident
- Released: October 12, 1999
- Genre: Rock, jam band
- Label: SCI Fidelity Records

Keller Williams & the String Cheese Incident chronology
Spun (1998)	Breathe (1999)	Loop (2001)

Professional ratings
Review scores
Source	Rating
AllMusic	4/5 stars
The Encyclopedia of Popular Music	3/5 stars

Breathe is an album by Keller Williams with the String Cheese Incident (collectively known as the Keller Williams Incident), released in 1999.

== Critical reception ==
AllMusic wrote that "the accompaniment of the String Cheese Incident provides a wondrous canvas that elevates the richness of [Keller's] guitar work and frees him from the confines of looping." The Washington Post called the album "strange and delightfully odd," writing that "Williams weaves a lot of quirky textures and riffs into his original compositions, borrowing freely from funk, reggae, folk, pop and jazz to create a series of colorful backdrops for his curious musings ('Best Feelings'), entertaining rants ('Stupid Questions') and offbeat tales ('Vacate')."

== Track listing ==
1. Stupid Questions – 4:55
2. Brunette – 2:49
3. Breathe – 4:11
4. Best Feeling – 5:55
5. Bounty Hunter – 3:25
6. Vacate – 4:48
7. Roshambo – 3:06
8. Revelation – 5:10
9. Lightning – 4:18
10. Blatant Ripoff – 4:38
11. Not Of This Earth – 5:07
12. Rockumal – 3:21
13. Callalloo And Red Snapper – 9:37 *
- includes hidden track – [unknown title]

== Credits ==
- Lorne Bregitzer – assistant engineer
- Darrin Brunner – design, layout design
- Ty Burhoe – tabla, turntables
- Kevin Clock – engineer, assistant producer
- E-Dub – vocals
- Michael R. Everett – artwork
- Frenchy – paintings
- Scott Gallery – artwork, design, layout design
- Mary Louise Greenlaw – artwork
- Kyle Hollingsworth – organ, synthesizer, piano, keyboards, piano (electric)
- Jamie Janover – dulcimer (hammer)
- Michael Kang – mandolin, violin, vocals, violin (electric), electronic mandolin
- Mike Luba – trumpet
- Jeroen Wery – trumpet
- Keith Moseley – bass guitar (electric), bass guitar (acoustic)
- Bill Nershi – guitar (acoustic)
- Todd Radunsky – photography
- Jeremy Stein – photography
- Michael Travis – percussion, drums
- Keller Williams – guitar (acoustic), piano, arranger, bass guitar (electric), flugelhorn, guitar (electric), vocals, guitar (10 string), producer, bass guitar (acoustic), piano (grand)
