= Carnival '99 =

Live album by the String Cheese Incident
- Released: February 1, 2000
- Recorded: Various live performances in 1999
- Genre: Jam band, jazz
- Length: 2:09:40
- Label: SCI Fidelity
- Producer: The String Cheese Incident

The String Cheese Incident chronology
'Round the Wheel (1998)	Carnival '99 (2000)	Outside Inside (2001)

Professional ratings
Review scores
Source	Rating
Allmusic	link

Carnival '99 is the fourth release and second live album of Colorado-based jam band, the String Cheese Incident. This double album was taken from various live performances throughout 1999.

== Track listing ==
1. "Shenandoah Breakdown" (Traditional) - 3:28
2. "Missin' Me" (Kyle Hollingsworth, Paul Kleutz) - 14:32
3. "Mouna Bowa" (Guy N'Sangue, Jean Luc Ponty) - 7:04
4. "Barstool" (Bill Nershi) - 4:43
5. "Take Five" (Paul Desmond) - 7:17
6. "Hey Pocky Way" (Ziggy Modeliste, Art Neville, Leo Nocentelli, G.Porter Jr.) - 8:22
7. "Black Clouds" (Bill Nershi) - 13:16
8. "Lester's Rant" - 0:47
9. "Footprints" (Wayne Shorter) - 6:46
10. "Don't Say" (Kyle Hollingsworth) - 14:18
11. "Birdland" (Joe Zawinul) - 12:51
12. "Hold Whatcha Got" (Jimmy Martin) - 4:22
13. "Jellyfish" (The String Cheese Incident) - 14:11
14. "Drum Jam" (String Cheese Incident) - 4:13
15. "Texas" (Bill Nershi) - 13:30

== Credits ==
=== The String Cheese Incident ===
- Bill Nershi – acoustic guitar
- Keith Moseley – bass guitar
- Kyle Hollingsworth – accordion, organ, piano
- Michael Kang – mandolin, violin
- Michael Travis – percussion, conga, timbales, drums
