= Born on the Wrong Planet =

Studio album by the String Cheese Incident
- Released: June 14, 1997
- Recorded: January 1996
- Studio: Akashic
- Genre: Jam band, bluegrass
- Length: 60:52
- Label: SCI Fidelity
- Producer: The String Cheese Incident

The String Cheese Incident chronology
Born on the Wrong Planet (1997)	A String Cheese Incident (1997)

Professional ratings
Review scores
Source	Rating
AllMusic	4/5 stars

Born on the Wrong Planet is the 1997 debut album of the String Cheese Incident.

== Track listing ==
1. "Black Clouds" (Bill Nershi) - 4:23
2. "Born On The Wrong Planet" (Bill Nershi) - 4:57
3. "Land's End" (Tim O'Brien) - 5:19
4. "The Remington Ride" (Hank Penny, Herb Remington) - 4:10
5. "Résumé Man" (Keith Moseley) - 3:46
6. "Elvis' Wild Ride" (Bill Nershi) - 4:29
7. "Bigger Isn't Better" (Bill Nershi) - 6:32
8. "Johnny Cash" (String Cheese Incident) - 6:06
9. "Lester Had A Coconut" (Jack Rajca) - 4:25
10. "Diggin' In" (Michael Travis) - 2:34
11. "Texas" (Bill Nershi) - 8:46
12. "Jellyfish" (Bill Nershi) - 5:25

== Credits ==
=== The String Cheese Incident ===
- Bill Nershi – acoustic guitar, vocals
- Keith Moseley – Bass guitar, vocals
- Michael Kang – Mandolin, Violin
- Michael Travis – percussion, Conga, drums, vocals, Multi Instruments

=== Additional personnel ===
- Tony Furtado - Banjo, Dojo
- Paul Armstrong - Hammond Organ
- Liza Oxnard - vocals
- Jamie Janover - bongos, vocals, Multi Instruments, didgeridoo
- Maya Dorn - Flute, vocals
- Stacey Ludlow - vocals, Multi Instruments, Flig Dig

=== Production ===
- Steve McNamara - Mastering
- The String Cheese Incident -Producer
- Jamie Janover - Contributor
- Ron Miller - Artwork, Paintings
- Christian Dicharry - Graphic Design
- Stacey Ludlow - Contributor
