= 12 (Keller Williams album) =

Studio album by Keller Williams
- Released: December 18, 2007
- Genre: Rock, Jam, Progressive bluegrass
- Label: SCI Fidelity Yellow Bus
- Producer: Keller Williams

Keller Williams chronology
Dream (2007)	12 (2007)	Rex (Live at the Fillmore) (2008)

12 is the twelfth album by Keller Williams, released in 2007. It features one song from each of his previous 11 albums, as well as one previously un-recorded song (Freshies).

Professional ratings
Review scores
Source	Rating
Allmusic	4/5 stars
HonestTune.com	favorable

== Track listing ==
1. Turn in Difference 3:24
2. Anyhow Anyway 5:24
3. Tribe 4:48
4. Breathe 4:13
5. More Than a Little 7:50
6. Freeker by the Speaker 4:54
7. Butt Sweat 4:42
8. Apparition 4:37
9. Keep It Simple 4:35
10. Local 4:08
11. People Watchin' 5:16
12. Freshies 2:43
13. The 'Make the Title Look Silly' Track 3:15

== Credits ==
- John Alagía – Engineer, Mixing
- Robert Battaglia – Engineer
- Mark Berger – Package Design
- Ty Burhoe – Tabla
- Kevin Clock – Engineer, Mixing
- Jeff Covert – Guitar, Engineer, Editing, Remixing, Mastering, Mixing, Soloist
- Doug Derryberry – Guitar, Engineer, Mixing
- Craig Dougald – Marimba
- Béla Fleck – Banjo, Engineer
- David Glasser – Mastering
- Louis Gosain – Engineer, Sample Engineering
- Bill Harris – Quintet Artwork
- Scott Harris – Bass
- Stacy Heydon – Engineer, Mixing
- Kyle Hollingsworth – Keyboards
- Scott Hull – Mastering
- Jamie Janover – Dulcimer (Hammer)
- Michael Kang – Violin
- Jenny Keel – Bass
- Larry Keel – Guitar
- Brian Durrett - Bass
- Jack Mascari – Engineer
- Bill Nershi – Slide Guitar
- Tye North – Bass
- Charlie Pilzer – Mastering
- Jim Robeson – Engineer, Mixing, Sample Engineering
- Jeff Sipe – Drums
- Clif Franck - Drums
- Michael Travis – Percussion, Drums
- Keller Williams – Bass, Guitar, Piano (Electric), Voices, Guitar (10 String), Guitar (12 String), Djembe, Shaker, Drum Samples
- Victor Wooten – Bass
