= Then There's Now =

'Then There's Now

Studio album by Kyle Hollingsworth
- Released: September 15, 2009
- Genre: Jam band
- Label: SCI Fidelity

Kyle Hollingsworth chronology
Never Odd or Even (2004)	'Then There's Now (2009)

Then There's Now is the second album by The String Cheese Incident keyboard player Kyle Hollingsworth, released on September 15, 2009. The album features Dave Watts (of the Motet) on drums, Ryan Jalbert on Guitar, Garrett Sayers on bass, and Damien Hines and DJ Logic on turntables. It also features Dar Williams, Liza Oxnard (of Zuba), and Alex Botwin (of Pnuma Trio).

== Track listing ==
1. Way That It Goes (Formigoni/Hollingsworth) – 3:41
2. She (Hollingsworth) – 3:53
3. Piece Of Mine (Hollingsworth) – 4:22
4. Phat Cat (Hollingsworth) – 4:33
5. Don't Wake Me (Hollingsworth) – 5:07
6. All I need (Hollingsworth/Jalbert/Sayers/Watts) – 2:25
7. Wide Open (Hollingsworth) – 5:52
8. Too Young (Hollingsworth) – 3:57
9. All Inside (Hollingsworth) – 5:21
10. On Fire (Hollingsworth) –

== Personnel ==
- Kyle Hollingsworth – keyboards
- Dave Watts – drums
- Ryan Jalbert – guitar
- Garrett Sayers – bass

=== Additional personnel ===
- Damien Hines – turntable
- DJ Logic – turntable
- Alex Botwin
