= Zilla (band) =

- Origin: Boulder, Colorado, United States
- Genres: Livetronica; Jam band
- Years active: 2003 – present
- Labels: SCI Fidelity
- Members: Michael Travis; Jamie Janover; Aaron Holstein
- Website: www.zillamusic.com

Zilla is a livetronica band based in Boulder, CO. It consists of Jamie Janover, Michael Travis and Aaron Holstein. The group began as a side project for Travis in his time away from the more popular String Cheese Incident. However, since SCI's hiatus in 2007 Zilla and EOTO have become Travis' main projects. The band's shows are 100% improvised, as are their two studio recordings.

== Discography ==
1. Zilla - 2005
2. Egg - 2005
3. all iZ - 2006
