= Never Odd or Even =

Studio album by Kyle Hollingsworth
- Released: November 9, 2004
- Genre: Jam band
- Label: SCI Fidelity

Kyle Hollingsworth chronology
Never Odd or Even (2004)	Then There's Now (2009)

Professional ratings
Review scores
Source	Rating
All About Jazz	4/5 stars
Allmusic	4/5 stars

Never Odd or Even is the debut solo album by The String Cheese Incident keyboard player Kyle Hollingsworth, released in 2004. The album features Dave Watts (of Motet) on drums, Ross Martin on guitar, and Matt Spencer on bass. It also features guests Joshua Redman, Robert Randolph, and Michael Kang (of String Cheese Incident).

== Track listing ==
1. "Prevolution"
2. "The Crusade" with Joshua Redman
3. "Seventh Step"
4. "The Bridge" with Robert Randolph
5. "The Preacher"
6. "Gigawatt"
7. "The Arc"
8. "Ohms"
9. "Don't Say"
10. "Not Yet"
11. "Boo Boo’s pik-a-nik"
12. "¡Bam!" with Joshua Redman
13. "The Revolution"

== Personnel ==
- Kyle Hollingsworth – keyboards
- Dave Watts – drums
- Ross Martin – guitar
- Matt Spencer – bass

=== Additional personnel ===
- Joshua Redman – saxophone
- Robert Randolph – pedal steel guitar
- Michael Kang – electric mandolin
