= Buzz (Keller Williams album) =

1996 album by Keller Williams

Studio album by Keller Williams
- Released: 1996
- Genre: Rock Jam
- Label: SCI Fidelity Records
- Producer: Keller Williams

Keller Williams chronology
Freek (1994)	Buzz (1996)	Spun (1998)

Buzz is the second album by Keller Williams, released in 1996. It covers many genres of music such as world beat, reggae, bluegrass and rock.

== Track listing ==
1. Sunny Rain 4:07
2. Sally Sullivan 5:01
3. Relaxation Station 4:06
4. Fuel For The Road 4:49
5. Stinky Green 5:46
6. Yoni 6:06
7. Over Dub 1:40
8. Anyhow Anyway 5:24
9. Inhale To The Chief 3:02
10. Killer Waves 4:51
11. Best Feeling 6:04
12. Same Ol' 4:16
13. Molly Maloy 1:44

== Credits ==
- John Alagía - Assistant Engineer
- Doug Derryberry - Guitar, Piano (Electric), Engineer
- Craig Dougald - Marimba
- Gibb Droll - Guitar (Electric)
- Tracee Harris - Artwork
- Larry Keel - Guitar on Inhale to the Chief and Sunny Rain
- Will Lee - Banjo
- Danny Knicely - Mandolin
- Sander Siemons - Violin
- Pete Mathis - Piano (Electric)
- Andy Waldeck - Bass
- Brian Durrett - Bass
- Clif Franck - Drums
- Noel White - Drums
- Keller Williams - Arranger, Bongos, Vocals, Guitar (10 String), Shaker
