= Rose Hill Drive =

American rock band

- Origin: Boulder, Colorado, United States
- Genres: Hard rock Blues rock
- Years active: 2003–present
- Labels: Slow and Shirley Records; Megaforce; SCI Fidelity Records
- Members: Daniel Sproul; Jacob Sproul; Nathan Barnes
- Past members: Jimmy Stofer
- Website: www.rosehilldrive.com

Rose Hill Drive is an American rock band. The group is often aligned with other bands that are reviving traditional hard rock and early metal–psychedelic. Combining hard-driving rock and blues with modern touches and arrangements, they are often described by reviewers as reminiscent of 1970s rock bands Led Zeppelin and Cream.

== History ==
Rose Hill Drive was formed in 2000 in Boulder, Colorado by brothers Jacob Sproul (bass guitar and vocals) and Daniel Sproul (guitar, backup vocals), and high school friend Nathan Barnes (drums). The present trio solidified after the departure of bassist Graham Webster, who later wrote about the band. The band takes its name from the street where the Sproul brothers lived and the band's early rehearsals took place.

Rose Hill Drive has performed with Stone Temple Pilots, The Black Crowes, The Who, Robert Randolph, Wilco, Queens of the Stone Age, Van Halen, Gov't Mule, The Answer and Aerosmith and also performed at Graspop, Bonnaroo, Wakarusa, Red Rocks, Austin City Limits and the Warped Tour.

== First album ==
On August 22, 2006, the band released their debut self-titled album on Megaforce Records. That summer, the band played the same stage as The Who at the Wireless Festival in Leeds and the Hyde Park Calling Festival in London. In the fall of 2006 and spring of 2007, Rose Hill Drive supported The Who on select US and European dates. The band was joined on stage in Chicago at a taping of the show "In The Attic" by Pete Townshend, who jammed on The Who classic “Young Man Blues” and Rose Hill Drive's "Raise Your Hands".

In the April 2007 issue of Rolling Stone Magazine, Rose Hill Drive was named one of the "10 New Artists to Watch" in 2007.

Though influenced by many other blues and hard rock bands from the 1960s and 70s, the band reported in Rolling Stone that they are growing weary of being compared so closely to other bands, as they want to be known for their sound, not how much they sound like somebody else.

Their song "Goal!" is the official anthem for the Colorado Rapids of Major League Soccer.

== Second album ==
The second album, Moon is the New Earth, was released on June 24, 2008, showing a blend of classic rock, punk-rock, psychedelia and even pop. The single "Sneak Out" appears in the popular video game Guitar Hero 5, released on September 1, 2009.

== Return after hiatus ==
After a 17-months hiatus, the band was resurrected in June 2010 to play a free concert in native Boulder, Colorado, with a revised line up: new member Jimmy Stofer was added on bass, while Jacob Sproul switched to rhythm guitar in order to let his brother Daniel concentrate on lead work. In an interview they said they had been writing new material, but without being in a rush to make a new album anytime soon.

The band published two new songs on their Myspace.com web page in September 2010, named 'Setting Sun' and 'Mr Right'. In February 2011 Rose Hill Drive went into the studio and recorded a new album, and announced on their website a new US tour supporting Stone Temple Pilots through April and May. After a respite in June, Rose Hill Drive returned to touring in July 2011 with 15 more shows, opening for Stone Temple Pilots as well as headlining their own events.

On June 12, 2011, the band released their new album, titled "Americana", on their new self-founded label "Slow and Shirley Records", with two tracks published on Facebook to listen to and download.

Their fourth album "Mania" was released on March 9, 2017 with a live show at the Fox Theatre.

== Discography ==
=== Studio albums ===
Year	Title	Label
2006	Rose Hill Drive LP	Megaforce and SCI Fidelity Records
2008	Moon is the New Earth	Megaforce Records
2011	Americana	Slow & Shirley Records
2017	Mania	self-produced album

=== Live albums, EPs and Single Play ===
Year	Title	Label
2005	Live at the Fox Theatre EP (4/8-9/2005)	independent
2006	Live at the Boulder Theater 2xLP (12/30/2005)	independent
2006	Rose Hill Drive EP	Megaforce and SCI Fidelity Records
2007	Rose Hill Drive Sneak Out SP	Megaforce Records

=== Compilations ===
Year	Title	Song	Label
2005	Stubbs the Zombie: The Soundtrack	"Shakin' All Over"	Shout! Factory

== See also ==
- Music of Colorado
