= Rex (Live at the Fillmore) =

Live album by Keller Williams
- Released: 2008
- Recorded: February 8, 2008
- Genre: Progressive bluegrass, Jam
- Label: SCI Fidelity Records

Keller Williams chronology
12 (2008)	Rex (Live at the Fillmore) (2008)	Odd (2009)

Rex (Live at the Fillmore) is the thirteenth album by Keller Williams, recorded live on February 8, 2006 at the Fillmore Auditorium in Denver, Colorado.

The collaborative show features Williams, Keith Moseley (of The String Cheese Incident) and Jeff Austin (of Yonder Mountain String Band) performing bluegrass versions of Grateful Dead songs. The group performed under the name Grateful Grass.

The album is available only as a digital download only, and was released on April 30, 2008. Proceeds from the album go to the Rex Foundation.

== Track listing ==
1. "One More Saturday Night" (Bob Weir)
2. "Mississippi Half Step Uptown Toodeloo" (Jerry Garcia, Robert Hunter)
3. "Eyes Of The World" (Garcia, Hunter)
4. "Candyman" (Garcia, Hunter)
5. "Loose Lucy" (Garcia, Hunter)
6. "Black Peter" (Garcia, Hunter)
7. "St. Stephen" (Garcia, Phil Lesh, Hunter)
8. "Casey Jones" (Garcia, Hunter)
9. "Brown-Eyed Women" (Garcia, Hunter)
10. "Bird Song" (Garcia, Hunter)
11. "Scarlet Begonias" > "Fire On The Mountain" (Garcia, Hunter / Mickey Hart, Hunter)
