= Rose Hill Drive (EP) =

EP by Rose Hill Drive
- Released: 2006
- Genre: Rock
- Label: Megaforce, SCI Fidelity
- Producer: Nick DiDia, Scott Roche

Rose Hill Drive chronology
December 30, 2005 Live at the Boulder Theater (2006)	Rose Hill Drive (2006)	Rose Hill Drive (2006)

Rose Hill Drive is the first official release by the American rock band Rose Hill Drive. The EP was released on the Megaforce/SCI Fidelity record label in 2006, the same year in which their debut album Rose Hill Drive was released. The release of the album meant that the EP was much less popular and was soon put out of print.

All of the songs from the EP except "Intruder" also featured on the debut album.

Due to demand from Rose Hill Drive fans who were unable to get a hold of the song "Intruder", the British-based magazine Classic Rock featured the track on the free CD titled Classic Rock Presents Bone Rattlin' Blues given away with issue 108.

== Track listing ==
1. "Raise Your Hands" (4:59)
2. "Man on Fire" (2:56)
3. "Intruder" (5:03)
4. "Cool Cody" [Live] (6:47)

== Band ==
- Nathan Barnes - drums
- Daniel Sproul - guitars and backing vocals
- Jacob Sproul - Bass guitar and lead vocals

== Production ==
- Nick DiDia - Producer, engineer, mixing
- Scott Roche - Executive producer
- Tom Tapley - Engineer, mixing
- Rodney Mills - Mastering
- Aaron Lasko - Mixing
- Joan Jones - Vocal Arrangement
