= Sight (Keller Williams video) =

Video by Keller Williams
- Released: June 28, 2005
- Recorded: November 2004
- Genre: Rock, Jam
- Label: SCI Fidelity
- Producer: Kevin Morris, Sarah Maher

Sight was a DVD released in 2005. The film is a recording of a two-day concert run by Keller Williams in November 2004 at Mr. Small's theater facility in Pittsburgh, Pennsylvania. The video includes 100 minutes of concert footage, including covers of songs by The Grateful Dead (Ship of Fools), Ani DiFranco (Swing) and Harold Arlen/Ted Koehler (Stormy Weather).

== Video Track Listings ==
1. Roshambo
2. People Watching
3. Juggler
4. Fuel for the Road
5. Freeker by the Speaker
6. Mental Brunette Instra
7. Ninja
8. Dear Emily
9. Above the Thunder
10. You Are What You Eat
11. Ship of Fools
12. Stormy Weather
13. Dogs
14. Not Tomorrow
15. Swing
16. Garage Night
17. Best Feeling
18. Smurd

== Credits ==
- Megan Agosto - Editing
- Mark Berger - Package Design
- Jeff Covert - Mixing
- Randy Grosclaude - Lighting Designer
- Larry Luther - Engineer
- Sara Maher - Producer
- Kevin Morris - Executive Producer
- Joe Rice Technical - Director, Authoring
- Keller Williams - Mixing
