= Home (Keller Williams album) =

Studio album by Keller Williams
- Released: August 26, 2003
- Genre: Rock, blues rock, jam
- Length: 45:15
- Label: SCI Fidelity

Keller Williams chronology
Dance (2003)	Home (2003)	Stage (2004)

Professional ratings
Review scores
Source	Rating
AllMusic	3/5 stars

Home is the eighth studio album by Keller Williams. Home centers on his love for his hometown of Fredericksburg, Virginia and contains audio clips from his childhood within the songs.

The album peaked at #39 on Billboard's Independent Albums chart in 2003.

== Track listing ==
1. Love Handles 3:07
2. Apparition 4:35
3. Tubeular 3:34
4. Victory Song 3:56
5. Butt Ass Nipple 1:48
6. Dogs 5:18
7. Skitso 3:16
8. Moving Sidewalk 3:48
9. Sheebs 3:25
10. Above the Thunder 5:42
11. Art 3:10
12. Casa Quetzal 3:50
13. Bitch Monkey 3:58
14. You Are What You Eat 6:01
15. Zilla 1:43
16. Sorry From the Shower 7:48

== Personnel ==
- Danny Clinch – inside jacket front photo (Keller on chair tilted)
- Jeff Covert – engineer, mixing
- Neil Glancy – design, package concept
- Louis Gosain – engineer
- Bo Hubbard – cover photo
- Diana Keeton – photography
- Josh Keeton – photography
- Keller's Mom – photography
- Charlie Pilzer – mastering
- Keller Williams – organ, acoustic guitar, bass, Dobro, percussion, piano, drums, electric guitar, vocals, voices, Djembe, guitar synth, instrumentation
