= Sound Tribe Sector 9 =

American instrumental rock band

Sound Tribe Sector 9 (STS9)
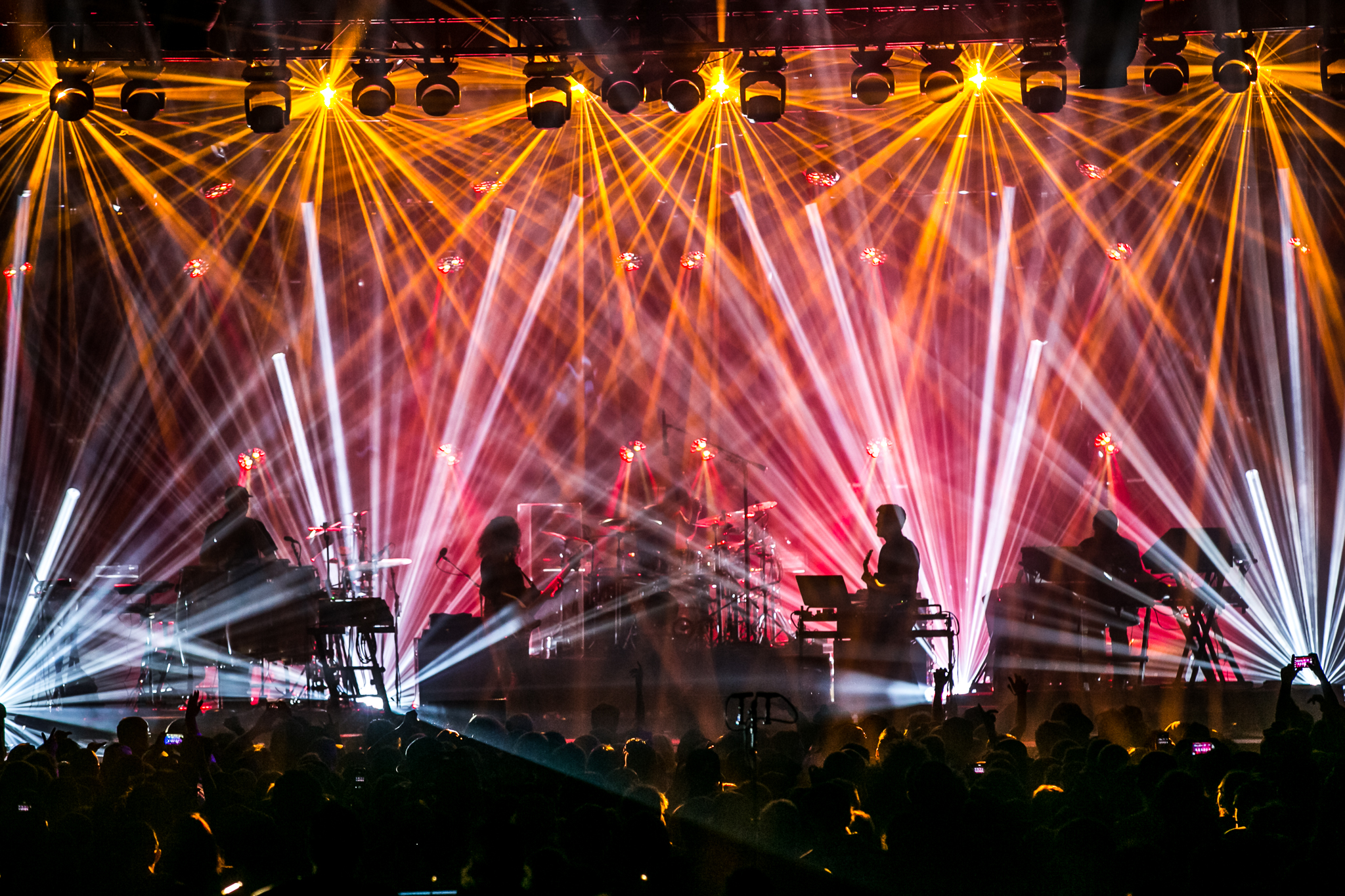
- Sound Tribe Sector 9 at Denver's Fillmore Auditorium 2015

Background information
- Origin: Santa Cruz, California; Atlanta/Athens, Georgia
- Genre: Livetronica
- Years active: 1997–present
- Label: 1320 Records
- Members: Hunter Brown; Jeffree Lerner; David Phipps; Zach Velmer; Alana Rocklin
- Website: www.sts9.com

Sound Tribe Sector 9 (STS9) is an instrumental band whose sound is based heavily on instrumental rock and electronic music, funk, jazz, drum and bass, psychedelia, and hip hop, originating in Georgia, United States. Self-described as "post-rock dance music," the band mixes standard live rock instrumentation with electronics, favoring group rhythm over individual solos.

STS9 has released 11 albums, two remixed albums (Artifact: Perspectives and Peaceblaster: Make it Right Remixes), and multiple live DVDs (Live as Time Changes, Axe The Cables, and various live performances) on their own label, 1320 Records. STS9 has toured the US and internationally.

== History ==
STS9 was formed in Snellville, Georgia (just outside Atlanta), in 1997. They played their inaugural show on October 3 of the same year.

The band has headlined stages at festivals such as Summer Camp, Wakarusa, Moogfest, Bonnaroo, Outside Lands Festival, Regeneration, Lollapalooza, Camp Bisco and Electric Forest Festival. The group has raised significant amounts of money towards activism efforts, including $150,000 to the Make it Right Foundation, paving the way to rebuild a house in the Lower 9th Ward of New Orleans.

In the band's 2016 studio album The Universe Inside, which is the twelfth in their full discography, STS9 continues to grow by incorporating dance and disco styles into their music. STS9's self-owned record label, 1320 Records, currently boasts over 300,000 unique downloads and over 1,000 releases by over 100 artists including Pretty Lights, Big Gigantic, ESKMO, and the Glitch Mob.

== Social work ==
STS9 has partnered with a variety of non-profit organizations throughout their career. Over the last two decades, they have partnered with Conscious Alliance to bring food drives to various concerts and festivals on their tour. In exchange for fan participation in these events, STS9 and Conscious Alliance thank patrons with limited edition artwork posters, often created by the same artists who accompany the band on stage. In 2005, STS9 put on a benefit concert where they raised over $20,000 for Hurricane Katrina victims.

Beginning in the fall of 2006, as part of their Live as Time Changes tour, STS9 traveled across the country in a carbon-neutral tour bus and powered their live concerts using renewable energy. The band hoped to offset 100%, or about 138,000 pounds, of their carbon dioxide emissions from their tour by donations of Renewable Energy Credits from their partnership with environment-friendly companies.

STS9's remix album, Peaceblaster: The New Orleans Make It Right Remixes, features 30 remixes of material from their 2008 album, Peaceblaster. All proceeds from this album went to the Make it Right Foundation, in an effort to build a home in New Orleans, which has since been completed and taken up by a family displaced by Hurricane Katrina. The home has many eco-friendly features, including solar panels, a high-efficiency HVAC system, wire-free lighting panels, tankless water heater, dual flush toilets, low emissivity windows and doors, a rainwater collection system, and water-absorbing native landscaping. For protection against future storms, the home has walls that can withstand 130 mph winds, Kevlar hurricane shields for the windows, and a roof hatch in case an escape is necessary.

== Notable concert performances ==
STS9 has gained acclaim, as well as a distinctly loyal fan base over the past decade. Their 2005 album Artifact reached #12 on Billboard's Top Electronic Albums. They have moved from playing and opening in small clubs and bars to headlining major music venues and festivals. In 2003, the band reached new heights by opening for The String Cheese Incident in their first amphitheater performance, at majestic Red Rocks Amphitheatre in Morrison, Colorado. A concert scheduled for the previous night at the Fox Theater in Boulder, Colorado, sold out in less than fifteen minutes. The band has now sold out numerous headlining Red Rocks shows, along with many other venues across the country.

In the San Francisco Bay Area, the band has built a following with frequent performances at The Fillmore, Warfield Theatre, and the historic Regency Center. They have performed at the Fillmore on ten occasions, including three two-night stands, a three-night stand for Halloween in 2004, and a four-night stand in early 2009. They have performed at the Warfield Theatre on five occasions, including a two-night stand. The band performed at the Regency Center on five occasions, including two consecutive New Year's Eve shows in 2002 and 2003. The band has also put on performances at the Independent, Great American Music Hall, Golden Gate Park, and the Stern Grove Festival. The band also performed at the Boulder Theater in Boulder, Colorado, for a five-night stand in March 2007.

Santa Cruz, California, has been home to various members of the band since moving to California. The band has performed at the Catalyst on nine occasions since 2002, including two two-night stands. The band frequently played a club called Palookaville, until it closed in 2002. In 2003, the band headlined the Santa Cruz Civic Center.

In their home state of Georgia, the band continues to ride their popularity. On October 3, 2006, the band marked the ninth anniversary of their first ever show with a celebration at the historic Georgia Theatre in Athens. The band has performed many multiple-night stands at the Georgia Theatre since 2002. For many years they have performed at the Tabernacle in Atlanta on New Year's Eve as part of multiple-night stands.

The band has also built their own fan base in Chicago, Illinois, after performing multiple times at North Coast Festival and Lollapalooza with late night performances at the House of Blues Chicago. Also making frequent trips to the Aragon Ballroom and the Congress, STS9 has made Chicago a go-to city for performances.

The band chose Denver as the host for their three 2009 New Year's Eve concerts. December 29 marked the band's first acoustic show ever, called "Axe the Cables." The band performed two sets at the University of Denver's Gates Hall. The remaining two nights were standard "electric" shows played at the Wells Fargo Theater. STS9 returned to Denver for New Year's Eve 2010, playing three shows at the Fillmore Auditorium. The December 29, 2010, show opened and closed with a cover of the Grateful Dead's "Shakedown Street".

For New Year's 2011, STS9 returned to the Tabernacle in Atlanta. They performed a five-night run starting on December 27. STS9 has continued to perform in Atlanta and Denver for New Year's since 2011.

In August 2012, STS9 played another "Axe the Cables" acoustic show at the Mountain Winery in Saratoga, CA.

In the summer of 2013, the band co-headlined a 14-city tour with Umphrey's McGee, alternating the closing slot each night.

In September 2014, STS9 returned to Red Rocks Amphitheatre in Colorado to play two nights to a sold-out crowd. This run included two Axe The Cables sets.

STS9 ended 2014 with a four-night stand at the Fillmore Auditorium in Denver. The band turned New Year's Day into a benefit for Conscious Alliance, inviting 600 fans to a sit-down dinner and a full improv set. This performance was later released through BitTorrent with the full 2014 catalog.

Returning to Red Rocks Amphitheatre in Colorado in September 2015, the group once again sold out both nights.

=== Festival appearances ===
STS9 has a steady presence in the music festival circuit, headlining several festivals across the country each season.

In 2007, the band announced they would return to Deerfields for a new festival titled Re:Generation. The two-day festival included additional performances from the Join and Telefon Tel Aviv. According to the band's website, this event promised to be "a unique celebration of music, nature, family, mind, body, and spirit." In 2011, STS9 re-created the Re:Generation festival in its second incarnation held at Horning's Hideout in North Plains, Oregon, with a lineup that included Glitch Mob, Beats Antique, and Tycho.

In May 2008, the band performed at the Summer Camp Music Festival in Chillicothe, Illinois.

On Saturday June 7, 2008, the band headlined the Sun Down Stage at the Wakarusa Music Festival at Clinton State Park, Lawrence, Kansas.

At Rothbury 2008, the band performed a three and a half hour show, which packed a capacity crowd.

In June 2011, the band performed at Bonnaroo in Manchester, Tennessee. Their show began at 2:30 am and played until sunrise.

In 2012, the band performed at the Hangout Music Festival, Electric Forest, High Sierra Music Festival, and North Coast Festival.

From 2013, STS9 has performed at festivals including High Sierra Music Festival, Moonrise Festival, Suwannee Hulaween, Pemberton Music Festival, All Good Music Festival, Bonnaroo, Wakarusa, Summer Camp Music and Camping Festival, BUKU, The Voodoo Music + Arts Experience, Hangout Music Festival, Beale Street Music Festival, Counterpoint, Summer Set Music Festival and McDowell Mountain Festival.

In 2018, STS9 organized and headlined the first annual Wave Spell Festival in Belden Town, CA. During this festival they played 9 sets of music, 3 of which were entirely improvised. A variety of musical performers joined STS9 at Wave Spell, including: Sunsquabi, eDIT and Ooah of the Glitch Mob, Manic Focus, Charlesthefirst, Antennae, and others. In addition to these guests, David Phipps and Zach Velmer of STS9 performed solo sets. The band has announced the second year of Wave Spell, which will occur in August 2019.

== Members ==
- Hunter Brown – guitars, keyboards (1997–present)
- David Phipps – keyboards, synthesizers, programming (1997–present)
- Zach Velmer – drums, electronic percussion, programming (1997–present)
- Jeffree Lerner – percussion, keyboards, programming (1999–present)
- Alana Rocklin – bass guitar (2014–present)

Former

- David Murphy – bass guitar, keyboards, programming (1997–2014)

== Discography ==
- 1999: Interplanetary Escape Vehicle – Landslide Records (Live)
1. Moon Socket (10:05)
2. Hubble (7:10)
3. Wika Chikana (12:56)
4. H. B. Walks to School (6:00)
5. Four Year Puma (6:39)
6. Tap-In (2:45)
7. Quests (5:36)
8. Evasive Maneuvers (5:50)
- 1999: Sector 9 – The Brown Album – Landslide Records (Live)
1. Tap-In
2. T. W. E. L. V. E.
3. Kamuy
4. Frequencies Peace 1
5. Frequencies Peace 2
6. Frequencies Peace 3
7. Surreality
8. Lub Duh Earf
- 2000: Offered Schematics Suggesting Peace – Landslide Records
1. Foreword (0:22)
2. Squares and Cubes (6:10)
3. Otherwise Formless (6:13)
4. Kamuy (5:34)
5. Water Song (3:40)
6. Common Objects Strangely Placed (2:19)
7. ...And Some Are Angels (6:16)
8. Turtle (3:16)
9. Mischief of a Sleepwalker (5:37)
10. Inspire Strikes Back (8:05)
11. EB (10:33)
- 2002: Seasons 01 – 1320 Records (Live release, double CD)
1. A Gift for Gaia (12:13)
2. Jebez (15:28)
3. Ramone & Emiglio (19:18)
4. Satori (10:51)
5. Good for Everyday (8:34)
6. Equinox (8:41)
7. Kaya (12:17)
8. Eclipse (5:13)
9. Thread (15:40)
10. Breach (2:57)
- 2003: Live at Home – 1320 Records
1. Intro (0:48)
2. Kotamo (2:47)
3. Manatee (5:33)
4. L1nQs (2:02)
5. Since 7th (1:48)
6. Luma Sunrise (5:30)
7. Believe (2:07)
8. Haiku (2:14)
9. Oceans Ride (3:40)
10. N'terlude (0:23)
11. Havona Ascent (2:09)
12. Midwest (6:11)
13. Midwest Sky (1:31)
14. Egil (5:57)
15. Like That ? (1:14)
16. Purity Too (3:50)
17. Linguistics (4:41)
18. Care Too (2:44)
19. Power Is The People (2:29)
20. Tact (4:00)
21. Summit (7:08)
22. Drone Slowly (a Walk Through Philly) (3:35)
23. Slight Shift (Firetrucks Outro) (1:19)
- 2005: Artifact – 1320 Records -- #12 on Billboard's Top Electronic Albums chart
1. musical story, yes (0:28)
2. Better Day (4:49)
3. By the Morning Sun (3:35)
4. Tokyo (7:03)
5. ARTiFACT (2:12)
6. Native End (4:31)
7. ReEmergence (5:01)
8. Peoples (4:19)
9. GLOgli (5:20)
10. Today (4:21)
11. Tonight the Ocean Swallowed the Moon (2:51)
12. Forest Hu (0:50)
13. Somesing (6:49)
14. Trinocular (4:44)
15. Vibyl (3:00)
16. 8 & A Extra (1:28)
17. Possibilities (3:45)
18. Peoples part II (4:02)
19. first mist over Clear Lake (0:56)
20. Music, Us (3:11)
21. Bonus track: Tokyo (radio edit) (4:04)
- 2005: Artifact: Remixes Vol.1 (iTunes exclusive, 4-tracks) – 1320 Records
- 2005: Artifact: Perspectives – 1320 Records (Remix album)
1. Better Day Remix (Sub-id) (4:05)
2. Tokyo Remix (Machinedrum) (5:01)
3. Possibilities Remix (Collective Efforts) (3:47)
4. Tokyo/Better Day Remix (Ming+FS) (5:07)
5. By the Morning Sun Remix (Slicker) (5:31)
6. Somesing (Eustachian 24hr. White Knuckle Mix) (3:45)
7. Possibilities Remix (Eliot Lipp & Leo 123) (4:17)
8. Better Day/Trinocular STSDevine Remix (Richard Devine) (6:03)
9. By the Morning Sun Remix (Metrognome) (5:04)
10. Possibilities Remix (Mr. Lif) (3:38)
11. Tokyo Shinjuku Flashback Mix (Bill Laswell) (9:12)
12. Somesing Remix (Bassnectar) (2:38)
13. ReEmergence, Beat the Science Remix (Karsh Kale) (6:43)
14. Peoples, Cause & FX Remix (Lowpro Lounge: Audio Angel & ill45) (5:49)
15. Better Day Remix (Genetic) (4:19)
- 2008: Here...Catch Essential Live Recordings (Live Compilation, distributed only in Japan)
- 2008: Peaceblaster – 1320 Records
- 2009: Peaceblaster: The New Orleans Make it Right Remixes – 1320 Records
- 2009: Ad Explorata – 1320 Records
- 2010: Axe the Cables – 1320 Records (Live acoustic set)
- 2011: When the Dust Settles 1320 Records (EP)
- 2015: One/One – 1320 Records (Live improvs)
- 2016: The Universe Inside – 1320 Records
- 2020: Visions Tapes – 1320 Records
- 2024: Chromalight – 1320 Records
- 2025: Human Dream 1 – 1320 Records

== Video and DVD ==
- 2008: STS9 Live in Santa Cruz – GrooveTV #201 (VideoCD, MPEG download); GrooveTV.net

=== DVD ===
- 2006: Live As Time Changes (DVD) – 1320 Records; recorded Live December 29–31, 2005
- 2009: Axe the Cables (on-demand streaming) –
- 2007–2010: STS9 Live (free streaming, on-demand streaming)
