= Razed (album) =

Studio album by EOTO
- Released: April 29, 2008
- Genre: Livetronica
- Length: 71:47
- Label: SCI Fidelity

EOTO chronology
Elephants Only Talk Occasionally (2006)	Razed (2008)	Fire the Lazers!!! (2009)

Razed (2008) is the second of three studio albums released by EOTO. Razed was recorded in Michael Travis's house in three days.

== Track listing ==
1. "cacao" – 4:57
2. "ash" – 5:58
3. "warp" – 6:30
4. "camel bend" – 5:45
5. "tipped off" – 4:40
6. "taking the fife" – 5:11
7. "gloren" – 6:57
8. "health plant" – 4:41
9. "slank" – 4:48
10. "say it" – 4:28
11. "tar tar" – 7:02
12. "graved" – 11:08
