= Loop (album) =

Live album by Keller Williams
- Released: September 18, 2001
- Genre: Rock, jam
- Label: SCI Fidelity Records
- Producer: Keller Williams

Keller Williams chronology
Breathe (1999)	Loop (2001)	Laugh (2002)

Professional ratings
Review scores
Source	Rating
Allmusic	4/5 stars

Loop is the fifth album by the rock artist Keller Williams. It was released in 2001 on SCI Fidelity Records. The album contains live recordings of three performances in the Pacific Northwest in 2000.

== Track listing ==
1. Thin Mint 4:15
2. Kiwi and the Apricot 4:07
3. More Than a Little 7:48
4. Vacate 6:21
5. Blatant Ripoff 4:22
6. Kidney in a Cooler 5:59
7. Landlord 7:03
8. Turn in Difference 6:00
9. No Hablo Espanol 2:26
10. Rockumal 3:13
11. Stupid Questions 7:52
12. Inhale to the Chief 4:28
13. Nomini 3:44

== Credits ==
- Tom Capek - Mastering
- Phil Crumrine - Multi-Track Mix
- Doug Derryberry - Mixing
- Keller Williams - Producer
