= Spun (album) =

Studio album by Keller Williams
- Released: 1998
- Genre: Rock Jam
- Label: SCI Fidelity Records
- Producer: Keller Williams

Keller Williams chronology
Buzz (1996)	Spun (1998)	Breathe (1999)

Spun is the third studio album by Keller Williams, released in 1998.

== Track listing ==
1. Running On Fumes 5:23
2. Tribe 4:46
3. Blazeabago 5:32
4. Thirsty In The Rain 3:42
5. 221" 3:51
6. Stargate 5:17
7. Spun 2:21
8. In A Big Country 3:47
9. Portapotty 4:00
10. Theme From The Pink Panther 2:59
11. Sleeping Giant 3:54
12. Dear Emily 2:39
13. Fat B 2:43

== Credits ==
- Big Country - Performer
- Scott Harris - Bass
- Henry Mancini - Performer
- Peter Rowan - Performer
- Jack Ryan - Photography
- Jay V Rizzi - Cover design
- Keller Williams - Bongos, Conga, Vocals, Guitar (10 String), Djembe
