= Rose Hill Drive (album) =

Studio album by Rose Hill Drive
- Released: August 22, 2006
- Recorded: January 2006
- Genre: Hard rock
- Length: 47:48
- Label: Megaforce Records, SCI Fidelity Records
- Producer: Nick DiDia, Rose Hill Drive

Rose Hill Drive chronology
Rose Hill Drive (2006)	Moon is the New Earth (2008)

Professional ratings
Review scores
Source	Rating
Allmusic	3.5/5 stars

Rose Hill Drive is the debut album from American power trio Rose Hill Drive. The album was released on August 22, 2006. The release of the album meant the Rose Hill Drive EP was put out of print as 3 of the 4 songs included on it feature on the album.

== Track listing ==
1. "Showdown" – 4:04
2. "Cold Enough" – 4:07
3. "Cool Cody" – 5:23
4. "The Guru" – 5:19
5. "In the Beginning..." – 1:36
6. "Brain Novocaine..." – 2:49
7. "Declaration of Independence..." – 2:23
8. "It's Simple" – 2:21
9. "Raise Your Hands" – 4:59
10. "Man on Fire" – 2:56
11. "Reptilian Blues" – 7:31
12. "Cross the Line" – 4:20

All songs by Rose Hill Drive. Tracks 5–8 form a connected acoustic suite, that flows continuously.

== Credits ==
- Jacob Sproul, bass guitar and lead vocals
- Daniel Sproul, guitars and backing vocals
- Nathan Barnes, drums
