= Dance (Keller Williams album) =

Studio album by Keller Williams
- Released: February 4, 2003
- Genre: Rock Jam
- Label: SCI Fidelity Records
- Producer: Keller Williams

Keller Williams chronology
Laugh (2002)	Dance (2003)	Home (2003)

Professional ratings
Review scores
Source	Rating
Allmusic	2.5/5 stars

Dance is the seventh studio album by Keller Williams, released in 2003. It contains remixes of songs from his preceding album, Laugh.

== Track listing ==
1. Tweeker 4:41
2. Bazooka Speaker Funk 4:02
3. Chunter 4:32
4. Yeah 4:34
5. Room to Grow 3:44
6. Mental Floss 3:59
7. Better Than Reality 4:12
8. Barker 5:02
9. Flabbergasting 3:07
10. Chickahominy Fred 4:37
11. Worth All the Dough 4:30
12. Butt Sweat 4:40

== Credits ==
- Mark Berger - Design, Layout Design, Package Concept
- Jeff Covert - Engineer, Mixing
- C. Taylor Crothers - Photography
- Charlie Pilzer - Mastering
- Jim Robeson - Mixing
- Keller Williams - Producer
