= Laugh (Keller Williams album) =

Studio album by Keller Williams
- Released: February 19, 2002
- Genre: Rock Jam
- Label: SCI Fidelity Records
- Producer: Keller Williams

Keller Williams chronology
Loop (2001)	Laugh (2002)	Dance (2003)

Professional ratings
Review scores
Source	Rating
Allmusic	3/5 stars

Laugh is the sixth studio album by Keller Williams, released in 2002.

== Track listing ==
1. Freeker by the Speaker 4:52
2. One Hit Wonder 4:06
3. Hunting Charlie 4:01
4. Alligator Alley 4:07
5. Spring Buds 4:10
6. Mental Instra 4:39
7. Vabeeotchay 4:11
8. Bob Rules 5:41
9. Freakshow 3:06
10. Gallivanting 2:45
11. God Is My Palm Pilot 3:21
12. Crooked 5:04
13. Old Lady From Carlsbad 1:09
14. Kidney in a Cooler 6:02
15. Freeker Reprise 16:06

== Credits ==
- Mark Berger - Design, Layout Design, Package Concept
- C. Taylor Crothers - Back Cover
- Mike Crotty - Flute
- Tom Faulkner - Illustrations
- Louis Gosain - Harmony Vocals
- Danny Knicely - Mandolin
- Kevin Morris - Handclapping
- Tye North - Bass, Illustrations, Throat Singing
- Charlie Pilzer - Mastering
- Wolfe Quinn - Trombone
- Jim Robeson - Engineer, Mixing
- Dave Watts - Drums, Tracking
- Keller Williams - Guitar (Acoustic), Piano, Guitar (Electric), Vocals, Producer, Photography, Water Bowl
