= Freek (album) =

Studio album by Keller Williams
- Released: 1994
- Genre: Rock, jam
- Length: 60:03
- Label: SCI Fidelity Records
- Producer: John Alagía, Doug Derryberry

Keller Williams chronology
Freek (1994)	Buzz (1996)

Freek is the debut album by Keller Williams, released in 1994. It contains mostly solo arrangements of his early tracks.

== Track listing ==
1. The Juggler 3:11
2. Turn in Difference 3:22
3. Friendly Pyramid 4:13
4. In the Middle 4:37
5. Chillin' 4:18
6. The Miss Annie Overture in A :35
7. Passapatanzy 3:35
8. Shapes of Change 4:31
9. The River 10:38
10. A Day That Never Was 4:01
11. Get on Up/Sanford and Son 6:36

== Personnel ==
- John Alagía - Producer, Engineer
- Doug Derryberry - Producer, Engineer
- Dave Glasser - Mastering
- Thane Kerner - Cover Design
- Scott Martin - Photography
- Charlie Burns - Creative Director
- Freky Aziz Reffelruz - Background Dancer
- Keller Williams - Guitar, Percussion, Harp, Vocals, Guitar (12 String), Producer, Engineer
- Clif Franck - Drums
- Brian Durrett - Bass
