= Gibb Droll =

American musician

Gibb Droll is an American guitarist known for his blues-infused rock. He is the founder of the Gibb Droll Band, but more recently has played with the group Keller Williams with Moseley, Droll and Sipe (formerly the WMDs). He is currently a member of Bruce Hornsby's backing band, the Noisemakers. He has appeared on Jay Leno, Conan O'Brien, The CBS Morning Show, A&E, MTV, VH1, and CMT. His albums have sold over 50,000 records independently, been acknowledged in Billboard Magazine and earned himself a spot in the Rolling Stone Reader's Top 20 Poll.

== Early years ==
Droll was raised in Virginia Beach, VA, where he was known as an avid skateboarder and guitarist at an early age. Droll is a self-taught musician, recalling in an early nineties interview:

I haven't been schooled. My brother sold me a guitar when I was ten years old. . . . I think I'm really in love with these damn wooden instruments.

The original lineup of the Gibb Droll band consisted of Droll on guitar, Tom Hall on bass, and Mike Williams (a.k.a. Funk Bubble) on drums.

== Discography ==
=== Gibb Droll Band ===
Year	Album details
1992	Gibb Droll (demo): Released: 1992; Songs: I Stand Alone, People, Lady in White, Down Down Down!
1993	Gibb Droll Live: Released: 1993; Recorded @ Lewis', Norfolk, VA; Songs: Melting Pot, Blue Love Shawl, Texas Underground, Gentry's Song, People, Unfaithful Woman, Plastic Shuffle, Carrie, Bleeding Heart
1994	Dharma: Released: 1994; Label: Droll Tune Music (#CD002); Songs: Funk-E, Bama Grey, Texas Underground, I'm Cryin', Willie Was Here, Deck of Cards, All Blues, Day In Flint, Unfaithful Woman, Gentry Song, Circumstantial Blues
1995	Narrow Mouth Jar: Released: July 7, 1995; Label: Moonwink (#003); Songs: Time, Changes, You're Gonna Need Me, Ducky, Drop Dee, Crown, Blue Love Shawl, Fade Away, Carrie, A Dobro of Adam's
1998	Gibb Droll EP (Loaded): Released: 1998; Songs: Loaded, Day Into Night, Indian Song, Time is Free, Leftside, Mexico
1999	Packin' (ep): Released: 1999; Songs: Packin', Walking Away, Boston, Wasted Time, One More Night
2002	Walking Away: Released: 2002; Label: Bumble Records (#1-4215); Songs: Want You Back, Walking Away, Boston, Eden, Reappear, Mexico, Radio Song, Throw, Loueasyann, I'm Gone, Only One, Woody, One More Night
2006	Ten Days: Released: April 1, 2006; Songs: Free, My Love, Diamonds, Drive Thru, 5 Palm Leaf, Coa-co, Preacher, One Pain, Can't Believe, Keeps Me Around
2009	Bull Session (w/ Greg Humphreys): Released: August 27, 2009; iTunes exclusive; Songs: Birmingham, Cellophane Sunrise, Goodbye Baby (Baby Goodbye), Tortoise, Blue Velvet

=== Keller Williams with Moseley, Droll and Sipe ===
- 12 (2007)

=== Compilations ===
- Aware Compilation, Vol. 3 (1995)
