= Honkytonk Homeslice =

American band

- Origin: United States
- Genres: Bluegrass, folk
- Years active: 2004–present
- Members: Bill Nershi; Jilian Nershi; Scott Law

Honkytonk Homeslice is a band created by The String Cheese Incident frontman Bill Nershi. The band consists of Bill Nershi, his wife Jilian Nershi, and singer-songwriter, Scott Law. Honkytonk Homeslice began in the summer of 2004, when the trio was singing and playing at their campsite at Horning's Hideout, during a String Cheese-sponsored music festival in Oregon.

The band says they are "drawing on the whole history of bluegrass, old time music, pre-Nashville country, the psychedelic country music of Gram Parsons and Emmylou Harris, even a few String Cheese and Talking Heads tunes."

Their self-titled debut CD contains thirteen songs of acoustic Americana music. This album is a return to roots for Bill Nershi, who says "this band takes the music back to the kind of shows SCI did when it began."
