= University Hill, Boulder =

Neighborhood in Boulder, Colorado, United States

Coordinates: 40.007443°N 105.276747°W

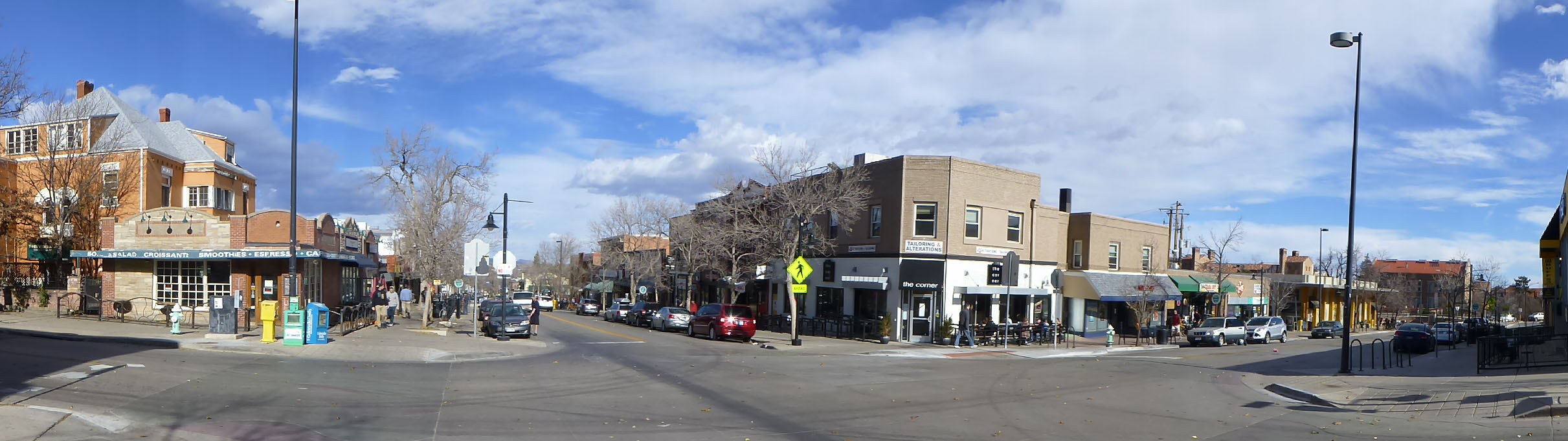
Panoramic shot of The Hill business district from 13th and College looking North and East

The Hill, a neighborhood in Boulder, Colorado, lies directly west of the University of Colorado campus. The fraternities and sororities associated with CU are located on The Hill as are several establishments associated with the social lives of its students. It is a mixed residential neighborhood with substantial private student housing. It was the center of counterculture activity in Boulder during the 1960s and 70s.

Boulder was a dry town, no liquor sales allowed. However, 3.2% beer was allowed, which 18-year-olds could purchase. The Sink, founded in 1923, and Tulagi's, founded in the 1940s, were 3.2% watering spots located on The Hill that were popular with students. Tulagi's was a modest music venue, where, in winter 1971, a new band, The Eagles, played to an audience of 30. Other notable businesses, past and present, include Albums on the Hill, vinyl records; the Fox Theatre, a music venue; the Flatiron Theatre, now closed; Jones Drug and General Store, now closed; and The Fitter (formerly known as The Pipefitter), still open.

The Hill was popular with street people, who were not welcomed by business owners. The riots in May, 1971 resulted from an attempt by Boulder police, in response to complaints by businesses, to apply broken-window policing. Few, if any, students were involved. The riots involved hundreds of people and over 100 police and lasted 3 days; there were many arrests.

The City of Boulder has established the Hill Revitalization Working Group, an organization of stakeholders with interests on or with University Hill. It has been concerned with improving the business and residential climate on the Hill including the behavior of partying university students who sometimes celebrate later and more loudly than is acceptable.

== Unrest ==
On the evening of March 6, 2021, during COVID-19 pandemic in Colorado, a crowd of as many as 800 mostly university students, frustrated with COVID restrictions, gathered at 10th Street and College Avenue on the Hill, shooting off fireworks and flipping a car. A Boulder SWAT team in an armored vehicle was deployed and issued verbal warnings. Most of the crowd left, but some remained. Tear gas was employed. 3 SWAT officers were injured with their armored vehicle and a fire truck damaged. About 50 students who participated were sanctioned by the university with most receiving probation and a few being suspended.

== See also ==
- Museum of Boulder
