= Moon Is the New Earth =

Moon is the New Earth

Studio album by Rose Hill Drive
- Released: June 24, 2008
- Recorded: Spring 2008
- Genre: Hard rock, blues-rock
- Length: 46:29
- Label: Megaforce
- Producer: Rose Hill Drive

Rose Hill Drive chronology
Rose Hill Drive (2006)	Moon is the New Earth (2008)

Professional ratings
Review scores
Source	Rating
Allmusic	link
HonestTune.com	(not rated)
Only Rock	link

Moon is the New Earth is the second album by American power trio Rose Hill Drive. The album was released on June 24, 2008. The first track on the album, 'Sneak Out', was released as a single. On the evening of July 29, 2008, Rose Hill Drive performed "Sneak Out" on Late Night with Conan O'Brien.

== Track listing ==
1. "Sneak Out" – 3:34
2. "Altar Junkie" - 3:33
3. "Laughing in the Streets" - 3:24
4. "Trans Am" - 3:45
5. "A Better Way" - 4:57
6. "My Light" - 3:43
7. "The 8th Wonder" - 4:36
8. "One Night Stand" - 3:10
9. "Godfather" - 3:47
10. "Do You Wanna Get High?" - 3:46
11. "I'm on to You" - 4:03
12. "Always Waiting" - 4:11

All songs written and performed by Rose Hill Drive.

== Credits ==
- Daniel Sproul, guitars and backing vocals
- Jacob Sproul, bass guitar and lead vocals
- Nathan Barnes, drums
