= Conscious Alliance =

U.S. nonprofit organization

Conscious Alliance is a national 501(c)(3) nonprofit organization based in Boulder, Colorado committed to supporting communities in crisis through hunger relief and youth empowerment.

== Organization ==
Conscious Alliance operates grassroots food collection and hunger awareness programs throughout the United States, primarily by organizing food drives at concerts and music events in exchange for limited edition concert posters. Donations to Conscious Alliance benefits America's local food pantries and economically isolated Native American Reservations.

Conscious Alliance has hosted hundreds of food drives at music festivals including Bonnaroo, Power to the Peaceful, and Wakarusa, and at concerts by artists such as The String Cheese Incident, STS9, Jack Johnson, Michael Franti & Spearhead, Dave Matthews, Phil Lesh, Bassnectar, and many others.
