= Rex Foundation =

Charitable non-profit organization

- Formation: 1983
- Type: Charitable organization
- Headquarters: San Francisco, CA, United States
- Executive Director: Cameron Sears
- Revenue: $335,638 (2015)
- Expenses: $332,984 (2015)
- Website: www.rexfoundation.org

The Rex Foundation was created by "members of the Grateful Dead and Friends" in 1983 as a charitable nonprofit organization to "proactively provide extensive community support to creative endeavors in the arts, sciences, and education." The organization is named after Rex Jackson, a Grateful Dead roadie and later road manager until his death in 1976.

== History ==
In the fall of 1983, the Rex Foundation was established as a non-profit charitable organization by members of the Grateful Dead and friends. The Rex Foundation enabled the Grateful Dead to go beyond responding to multiple requests for contributions, and proactively provide extensive community support to creative endeavors in the arts, sciences, and education. The first benefit concerts for the Rex Foundation were held in the spring of 1984 at the Marin Veteran’s Memorial Auditorium. Since 1984 the Rex Foundation has granted $8.2 million to some 1,000 recipients. Virtually all grant recipients are selected through the personal knowledge of decision makers – as a result, grant requests are not solicited. Grants are made once or twice a year.

== Mission ==
The Rex Foundation's stated mission is "to help secure a healthy environment, promote individuality in the arts, provide support to critical and necessary social services, assist others less fortunate than ourselves, protect the rights of indigenous people and ensure their cultural survival, build a stronger community, and educate children and adults everywhere."

== Artists participating (incomplete) ==
- Grateful Dead
- Bob Weir
- Mickey Hart
- Phil Lesh
- Donna Jean Godchaux
- Bill Kreutzmann
- The New Riders of the Purple Sage
- Keller Williams
- Grateful Grass (collaboration of Keller Williams, Keith Moseley, and Jeff Austin)
- Dark Star Orchestra
- Zen Tricksters
- Donna Jean and the Tricksters
- moe.
- Tea Leaf Green
- Assembly of Dust
- Ryan Montbleau Band

== Beneficiaries ==
The Rex Foundation has contributed to:

- The Achievement Academy at Simon's Recreation Center
- The American Indian College Fund
- American Music Theater Festival
- Bethesda Project (My Brother's House)
- Camp Winnarainbow
- The Committee for a Better North Philadelphia
- Families Against Mandatory Minimums Foundation
- The Family Assistance Program
- The Farm School
- Fishery Foundation of California
- Food and Friends
- Greater Philadelphia Food Bank
- Hanford Education Action League
- Huichol Sierra Fund for Community Development
- Lithuanian Basketball Team
- Mainstream Foundation
- Musicians United for Superior Education
- National Handicapped Sports
- Native American Women's Health Education Center
- O'Neill Sea Odyssey
- Peer AIDS Education Coalition
- The Poetry Project at St. Marks
- Project AVARY
- San Quentin Mass Choir
- Sunburst Projects (Music from people with HIV/AIDS)
- Wave Hill - Putting Children in Touch with Nature
- Whitechapel Art Gallery, London - John Virtue Exhibition
- United Indians of All Tribes Foundation
- Zen Hospice Project

and many others.

== Board Members ==
Bob Weir, Tim Walther, Cameron Sears, Sage Scully, John Scher, Cliff Palefsky, Roger McNamee, Nick Morgan, John Leopold, Michael Klein, Rosalie Howarth, Mickey Hart, Freddy Hahne, Carolyn Garcia, Andy Gadiel, Kristin Dolan, Stefanie Coyote, Barry Caplan, Diane Blagman, Steve Bernstein, Tim Duncan, Dawn Holiday, Jay Caauwe

Bill Graham (1984 – d.1991), Jerry Garcia (1984 – d.1995)

Executive Director

Cameron Sears

Advisory Board

Bill Walton, Jon McIntire, Larry Brilliant, John Perry Barlow (d. 2018), Bernie Bildman,

EMERITUS: Hal Kant
