= Into the Blue =

Into the Blue may refer to:

== Books ==
- Into the Blue (book), a 2003 book by Canadian writer Andrea Curtis
- Into the Blue, alternative title of the 2002 book Blue Latitudes by Tony Horwitz
- Into the Blue, a 1990 novel by Robert Goddard

== Music ==
=== Albums ===
- Into the Blue (Guy Barker album), 1995
- Into the Blue (Jacky Terrasson and Emmanuel Pahud album), 2003
- Into the Blue (Monique Brumby album), 2006
- Into the Blue (The Joy Formidable album), 2021
- Into the Blue (Broken Bells album), 2022
- Into the Blue, by Shakatak, 1986

=== Songs ===
- "Into the Blue" (Kylie Minogue song), 2014
- "Into the Blue" (Moby song), 1995
- "Into the Blue", by The Mission from the album Carved in Sand, 1990
- "Into the Blue", by Geneva from the album Further, 1997
- "Into the Blue", by Knuckle Puck from the album 20/20, 2020
- "Into the Blue", by Shobaleader One featuring Squarepusher from the album Shobaleader One: d'Demonstrator, 2010

== Films ==
- Into the Blue (1950 film), a British comedy directed by Herbert Wilcox
- Into the Blue, a 1996 TV movie adaption of the Goddard novel, starring John Thaw
- Into the Blue (2005 film), a 2005 film directed by John Stockwell
- Into the Blue 2: The Reef, an action film directed by Stephen Herek; sequel to the 2005 film

== Other uses ==
- "Into The Blue" (Cold Case), an episode of Cold Case
- Into the Blue, a "making of" segment of the Blue Planet II TV documentary series

== See also ==
- Into the Blue Again, a 2006 album by The Album Leaf
