= Fox Theatre (Boulder, Colorado) =

Coordinates: 40.008035°N 105.276479°W

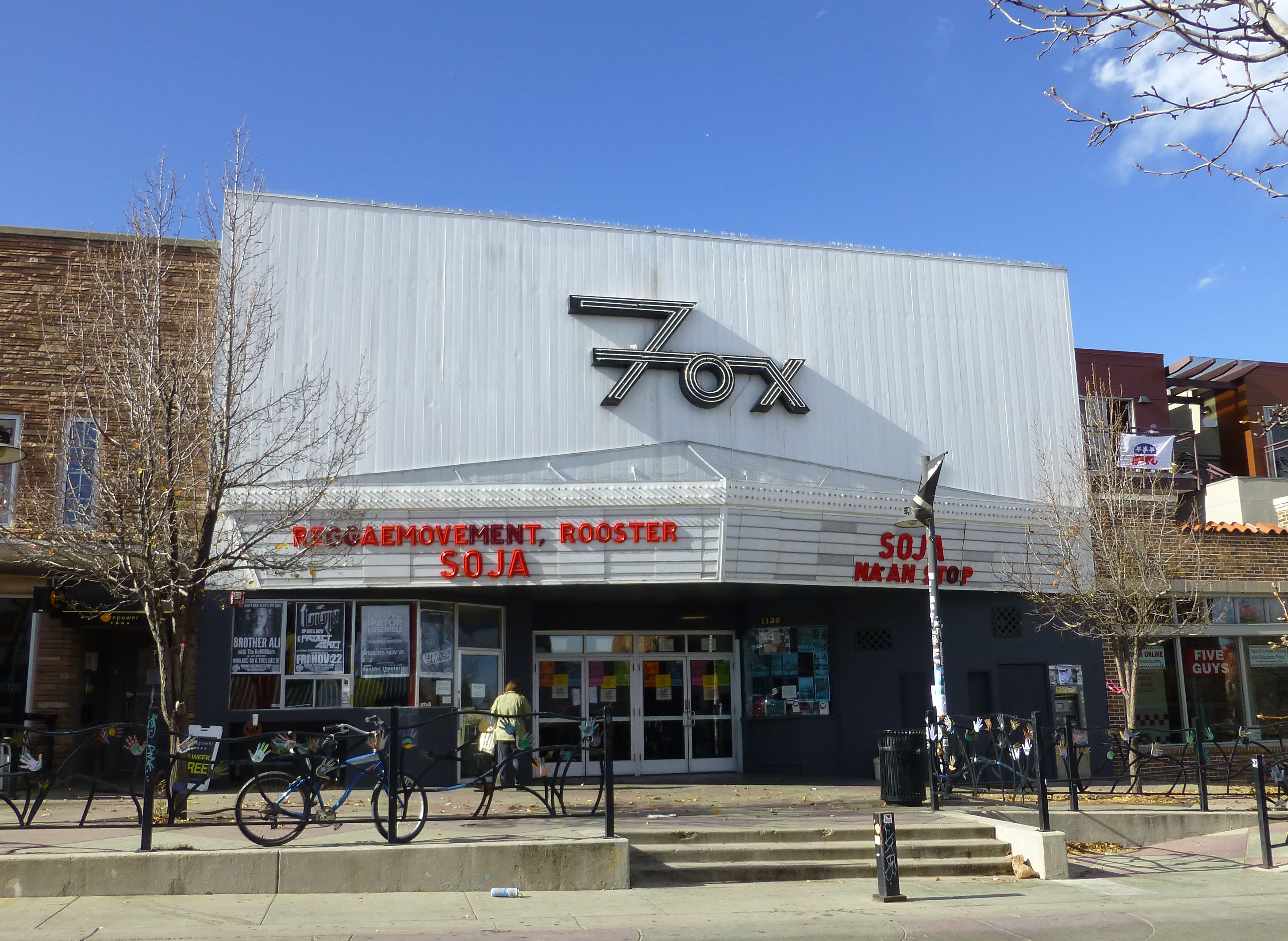
Exterior of Fox Theater

The Fox Theatre is a live music venue in Boulder, Colorado.

== Location ==
The Fox Theatre is located on "The Hill", a commercial, restaurant, and bar district in Boulder. The theatre is located on 13th Street next to the Tulagi's building. The Fox is located across the street from the University of Colorado campus. The Theatre can seat just over 600 people.

== History ==
The Fox Logo

Before the Fox became a music venue, it served as the Rialto Theater, the Buffalo Dancing Club, the Anchorage Bar & Grill, Ted’s Buff Cafe, and most recently, The Fox Movie Theater. The movie theater opened in 1961 and could seat up to 500 movie goers. Demolition of the Fox Movie Theater began in 1991 after a liquor license was acquired by the property owners. The demo began to uncover the roots of the building, dating back to 1926. The marquee sign and iconic Fox sign still on the building today are original from the movie theater era. The Fox Theatre first opened its doors to the public on March 6, 1992, with a performance from The Meters.

On March 6, 2022, the Fox Theatre celebrated its 30th anniversary, with a declaration from Governor Jared Polis.

== Notable acts who have played there ==
- Adele
- Bonnie Raitt
- The Chainsmokers
- Dave Matthews Band
- Deadmau5
- Fishbone
- The Fray, who signed their first record deal on the stage in 2004
- GRiZ
- Heavyweight Dub Champion
- Hunter S. Thompson
- Jack Johnson
- John Mayer
- The Killers
- Lyle Lovett
- Mac Miller
- Method Man
- Michael Kang
- Mickey Hart Band
- Phish
- The Samples
- Sheryl Crow
- Skrillex
- Snoop Dogg
- Sublime
- Sugarcult
- Umphrey's Mcgee
- Widespread Panic
- Willie Nelson
- Wu Tang Clan
- YBN Nahmir

The Fox has also hosted local acts including Air Dubai, Yonder Mountain String Band, Leftover Salmon, Kyle Hollingsworth's Band, The Drunken Hearts, West Water Outlaws, Jet Edison, The Magic Beans, Technicolor Tone Factory, Summa, Hot Soup, and many more.
