= Bethesda Project =

Bethesda Project is a nonprofit organization that provides shelter, housing, and programs reaching out to individuals experiencing homelessness in Philadelphia, Pennsylvania. Beginning as a small group of volunteers, Bethesda Project has grown to provide care that encompasses emergency shelter, housing, and supportive services at 11 locations in and around Center City Philadelphia.

Bethesda Project now serves over 1,400 individuals experiencing homelessness each year without regard to their race, age, religion, gender, disability, or sexual orientation.

== Mission statement ==
The mission of Bethesda Project is to find and care for the abandoned poor and to be family with those who have none.

== History ==
“Bethesda,” from the Hebrew for “house of loving kindness,” was the name of a pool on the outskirts of Jerusalem where the outcasts and marginalized gathered seeking healing. It was there that Jesus intervened on behalf of a long-suffering man who had no one to help him. Bethesda Project wants to intervene on behalf of those who have no one to turn to.

Bethesda Project was founded in 1979 by Father Domenic Rossi, a Catholic priest of the Norbertine Order at Daylesford Abbey in Paoli, PA. Sister Mary Klock, a nun who had been doing outreach on the streets of Center City, called Fr. Rossi and asked if he would take over responsibility for 10 mentally ill and homeless women she had coaxed into moving into a cramped space above a tavern at 12th and Sansom Streets. Fr. Rossi and members of his prayer group had been seeking to discern how to answer God’s call “to care for the abandoned poor” and Bethesda Project was born. Fr. Rossi and a number of volunteers devoted their time to meeting the most basic needs of the most vulnerable people in Center City. What started off as a completely volunteer-run effort eventually became an extensive network of facilities and programs for homeless men and women. In 1980, Bethesda Project incorporated as a nonprofit organization.

== Bethesda Project Shelter Programs ==
=== Bethesda Spruce ===
In 1983, Bethesda Project purchased a house on Spruce Street that became a permanent home for the women who had been living in the rooming house at 12th and Sansom. Bethesda Spruce provides permanent single-room occupancy housing with supportive services for 16 men and women who cope with chronic mental illness.

=== Bethesda Project's My Brother's House ===
Bethesda Project opened Bethesda Project's My Brother's House in 1984 as a shelter for men. Located at 15th and South Streets, it currently serves as a safe haven where 20 vulnerable men with untreated mental illness or addictions are offered an array of supportive services to stabilize their medical and mental health conditions to help prepare them for more independent living.

=== Bethesda Bainbridge ===
In 1986, Bethesda Bainbridge opened to house 28 men with histories of addiction or mental illness. Today, Bethesda Bainbridge, located at 15th and Bainbridge, provides permanent single room occupancy housing with supportive services for 30 men with histories of addiction and/or mental illness.

=== Bethesda Sanctuary ===
In 1988, Bethesda Project acquired a former convent at 20th and Christian Street, and a building at 720 North Broad Street. The convent became Bethesda Sanctuary, a transitional housing unit for 16 men in recovery.

=== Bethesda North Broad ===
in 1988, Bethesda North Broad became permanent housing for 49 men and women with histories of addiction or mental illness.

=== Bethesda Project's Dominic House and Mary House ===
Between 1996 and 1997, Bethesda Project acquired two more properties – Bethesda Project's Domenic House, which serves as its administrative offices in a storefront at 1630 South Street with six independent housing apartments upstairs for seven formerly homeless adults; and Bethesda Project's Mary House at 707 S. Hicks Street, a subsidized independent living environment for four men. Domenic House and Mary House are long-term, residential facilities for individuals prepared for a stable, largely self-sufficient living experience.

=== Bethesda Project's Our Brothers’ Place ===
At the request of the City of Philadelphia, Bethesda Project took over operation of a large men’s shelter at 9th and Hamilton Streets in 2003. Bethesda Project's Our Brothers' Place provides emergency shelter for 150 men as well as meals and programs for an additional 120 men who walk in each day. One of the largest shelters in Philadelphia, Bethesda Project's Our Brothers’ Place welcomes the Philadelphia Phillies organization each year to serve holiday meals to its residents.

=== Bethesda Project at Connelly House ===
Bethesda Project’s newest addition is its Bethesda Project at Connelly House program, a unique partnership with Project H.O.M.E. providing 79 units of affordable housing for people in recovery from addiction or mental illness. The LEED-certified building on 13th Street just south of Market houses Bethesda Project’s program for 24 men in recovery from addiction and opened its doors in 2010.

=== Bethesda Project's Church Shelter Program ===
In 1984, Bethesda Project established its church shelter program. Meals, overnight shelter, and case management services are provided for more than 116 individuals experiencing homelessness, in partnership with five area churches, including St. Mary's Chapel as a year-round shelter for 32 men, Old First Reformed Church as a winter shelter for 30 men, Trinity Memorial Church as a winter shelter for 22 men, The Well (a partnership with The Welcome Church and Trinity Memorial Church) as a Year-round respite for 12 women, and Church of the Holy Trinity Rittenhouse Square as a winter shelter for 20.
