= EOTO =

American electronic band

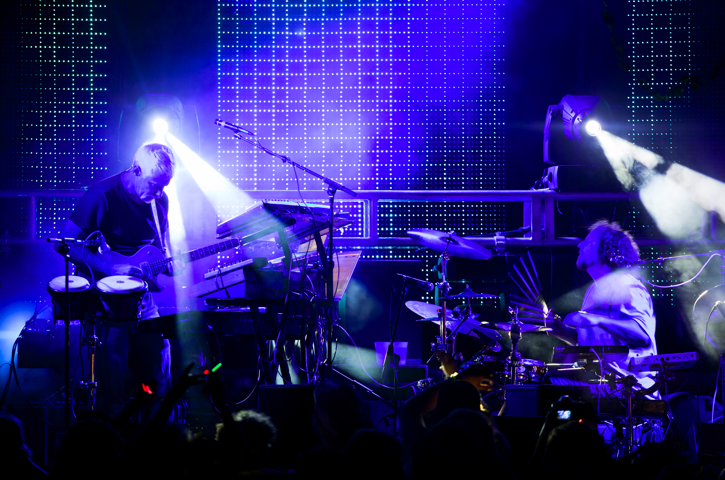
- Travis and Hann in 2009

Background information
- Origin: Boulder, Colorado, United States
- Genres: Electronic, experimental, dubstep, livetronica
- Years active: 2006-2021
- Label: SCI Fidelity Records
- Members: Michael Travis; Jason Hann
- Website: www.eotomusic.com

EOTO (/ˈiːoʊtoʊ/ EE-oh-toh) was an electronic band consisting of Michael Travis and Jason Hann. On July 22, 2021 the band announced via social media that they would no longer be performing, due to irreconcilable creative differences. The post indicated that the decision did not impact The String Cheese Incident, which they both play in.

== Description ==
The band's music is created live and without prerecorded loops. The band formed in 2006 as a side project of The String Cheese Incident incorporating looper pedals, like Echoplex and the production program Ableton. According to one reviewer, the duo sets their live instruments free and take on a new electronic flavor.

The band played their first show at Sonic Bloom in May 2006. In 2008 they played over 200 live shows and more than seven hundred shows in 48 different states during the five years since their founding. The band performs at Apple Stores to demonstrate how they produce their music in concert.

EOTO has released three studio albums. Each album is mixed and mastered from one live take including some pre-set sounds. EOTO also record many of its live shows and makes them available to fans on the Internet.

After experiencing dubstep at DJ Skream's set at Shambhala during the summer of 2008, the duo saw a change in their sound. Fire the Lazers!!!, their 2009 studio release, introduced a buzz-saw bass and heavier backbeat. Their music also incorporates sludge metal bass sounds and punk riffs.

EOTO originally stood for "End of Time Observatory", with the members pronouncing it as E-O-T-O, soon letting it blur to EeOhToe. After some Japanese fans pointed out that the word means "good sound" in Japanese, the band name has officially been the word EOTO instead of the acronym.

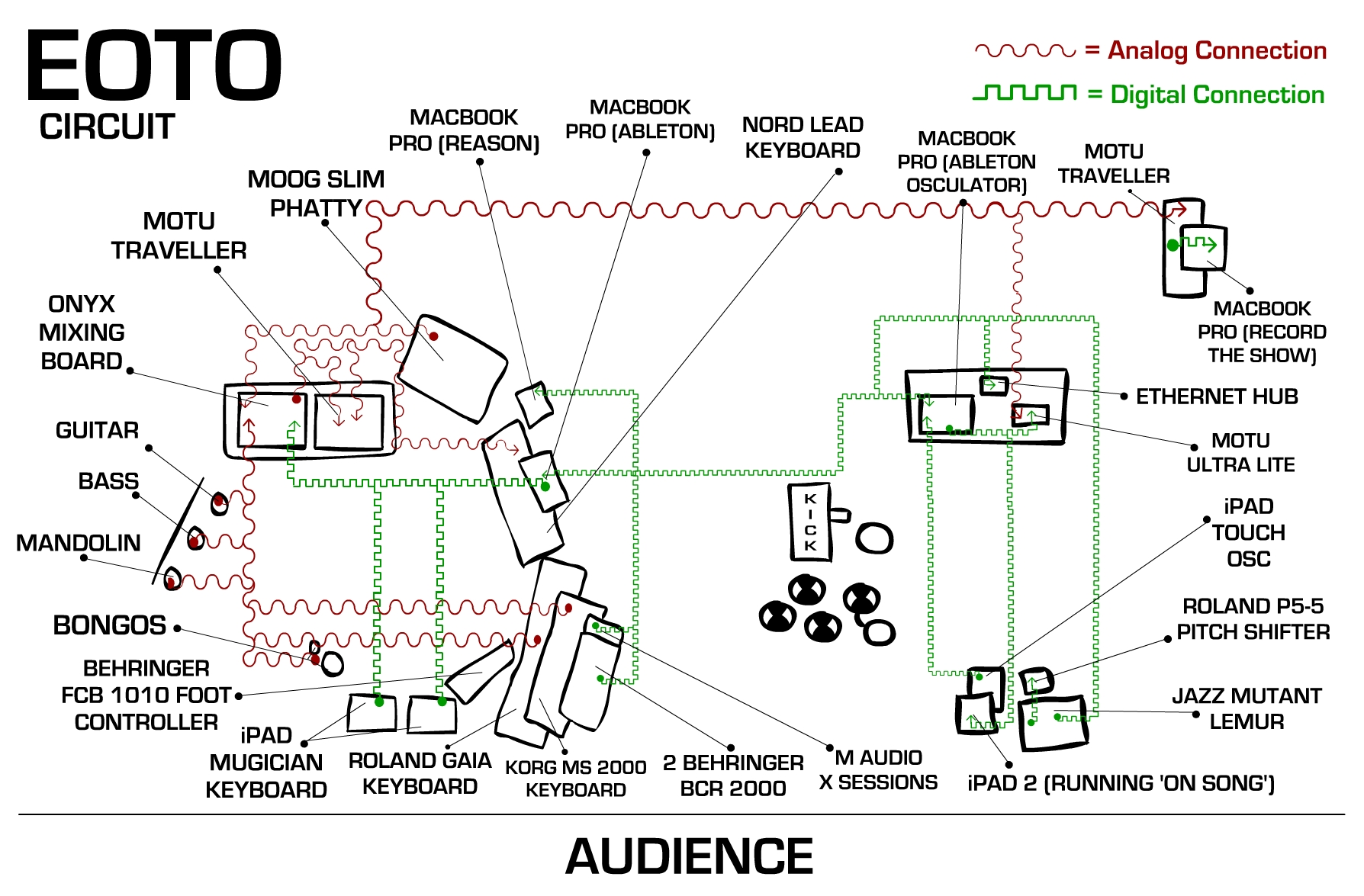
EOTO Hardware and Software Connections

== Equipment ==
EOTO uses Ableton Live as their primary software for looping. It is installed on Travis' and Hann's laptops which are MIDI synched together through an Ethernet network hub. Travis loops Keyboards, Bass, Guitar and Vocals through his laptop. Hann loops Vocals and Electronic Percussion through his laptop. Travis has another laptop that runs the Propellerhead software Reason, which contains keyboard and bass sounds that he programs.

Hann uses a Jazz Mutant Lemur Multi Touch pad, a Korg Pad Kontrol, a TC Helicon Synth Voice Tone Pedal, a Behringer Xenyx 502 mixing board, Paiste Cymbals, Pearl Drums, Peace 8" popcorn snare, a Toca Djembe, and Telefunken microphones.

Travis uses 2 MacBook Pro computers, one running Ableton and one running Reason, 2 Behringer BCR 2000 MIDI controllers, a Juno 106 keyboard, a Nord lead keyboard, a Korg MS 2000 keyboard, a Korg Kaos pad, a 5 string P Bass, a Les Paul Custom Guitar, an Octave Mandolin, an ONYX 12 Channel mixing board, and Behringer Xenyx 502 mixing boards.

== Video Jockeys ==
EOTO's VJs include Peter Berdovsky, AKA Zebbler (Shpongletron, Zebbler Encanti Experience) and Ben Cantil, AKA Encanti (Zebbler Encanti Experience). Zebbler uses the live bass and treble sounds during each show to trigger live visual events, included pre-made 3-D art, closed circuit cameras, and other visual effects.

== Discography ==
=== Studio albums ===
- Elephants Only Talk Occasionally (2006)
- Razed (2008)
- Fire the Lazers!!! (2009)

=== Live Compilations ===
- K-Turns & U-Turns Vol. 1: Fall Tour Compilation 2008 (2009)
- K-Turns & U-Turns Vol. 2: Best of 2009 (2010)
- K-Turns & U-Turns Vol. 3: Best of 2010 (2011)
