= Keller Williams =

American singer and songwriter

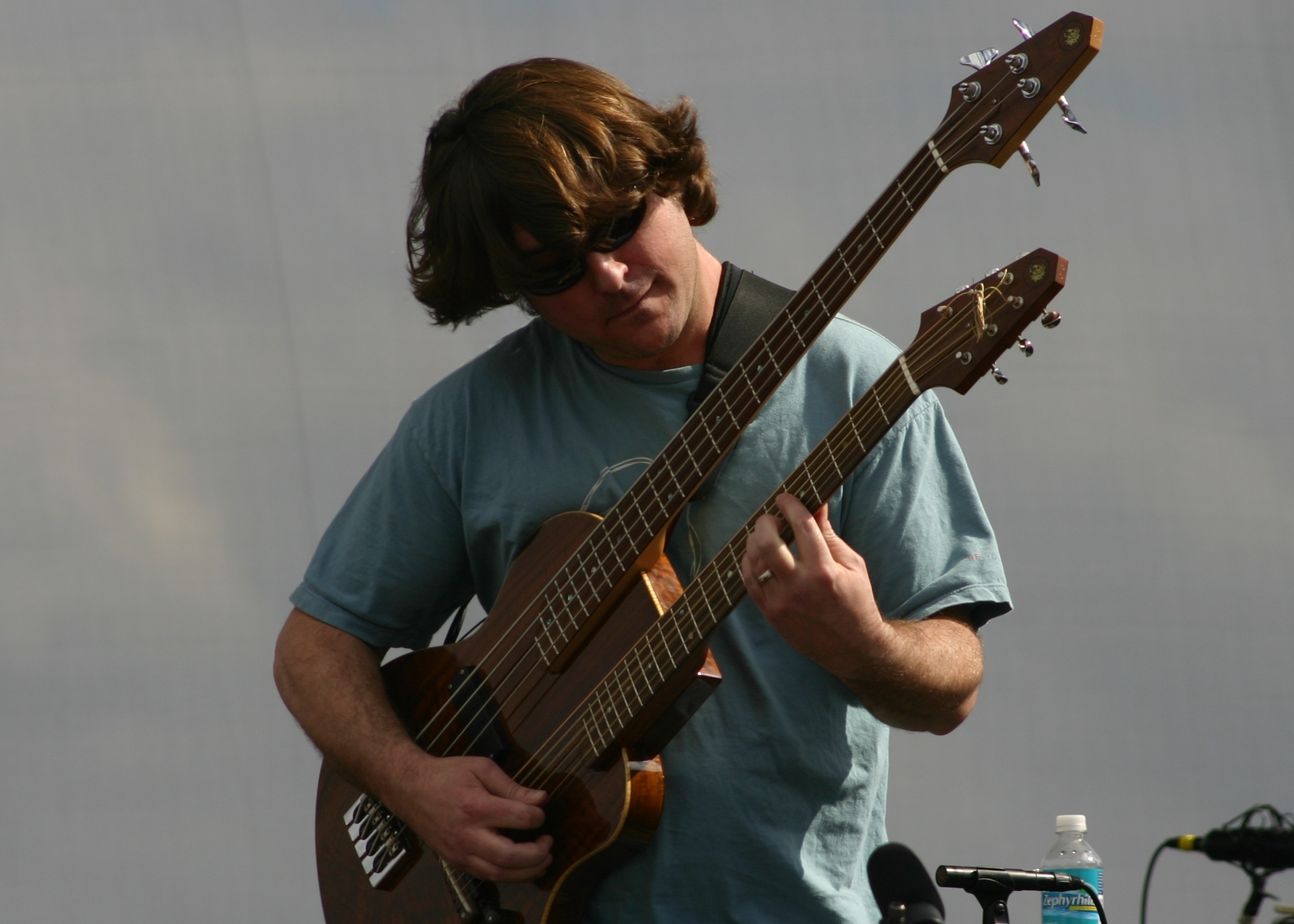
- Williams at Langerado Music Festival; March 9, 2008 Photo: Steve Moyles

Background information
- Also known as: K-Dub, Keller
- Born: February 4, 1970 (age 56); Fredericksburg, Virginia, United States
- Genres: One-man band, rock, jam, progressive bluegrass, dance, funk, folk, alternative rock, jazz, reggae
- Occupations: Musician, songwriter
- Instruments: Vocalist, guitar, bass guitar, percussion, theremin, synthesizer, piano. whistling
- Years active: 1991–present
- Labels: SCI Fidelity, Basil Leaf Music
- Formerly of: The String Cheese Incident with Keller Williams; Umphrey's McGee; Yonder Mountain String Band; Keller and The Keels; The WMDs; The Rhythm Devils
- Website: kellerwilliams.net

Keller Williams is an American singer, songwriter and musician who combines elements of bluegrass, folk, alternative rock, reggae, electronica/dance, jazz, funk, along with other assorted genres. He is often described as a 'one-man jam-band' due to his frequent use of live phrase looping with multiple instruments. Keller Williams was born in Fredericksburg, Virginia on February 4, 1970, and began playing the guitar in his early teens. He later enrolled at Virginia Wesleyan College in Virginia Beach where he received his degree in theater. After college, he moved to Colorado to advance his music career and expand his repertoire.

== Touring ==
Though primarily a solo artist, Williams has toured with Yonder Mountain String Band, The String Cheese Incident, Umphrey's McGee and Ratdog, and has frequently performed at The Bonnaroo Music and Arts Festival, the AllGood Music Festival, Summer Camp Music Festival, The Rothbury Festival, the Elysian Fields Music Festival, and Jam Cruise.

Williams has an audio taping policy of his performances, and for non-commercial trading of the recordings, but use of video or flash photography, or any recordings for profit are prohibited.

=== Keller Williams Incident ===
Keller Williams Incident is a collaborative performance between Williams and The String Cheese Incident. They have performed together, and Williams' 1999 album Breathe was released collaboratively under the name Keller Williams Incident. Williams and SCI began collaborating after Williams saw the band perform in Colorado, offering to play with them in exchange for free ski passes.

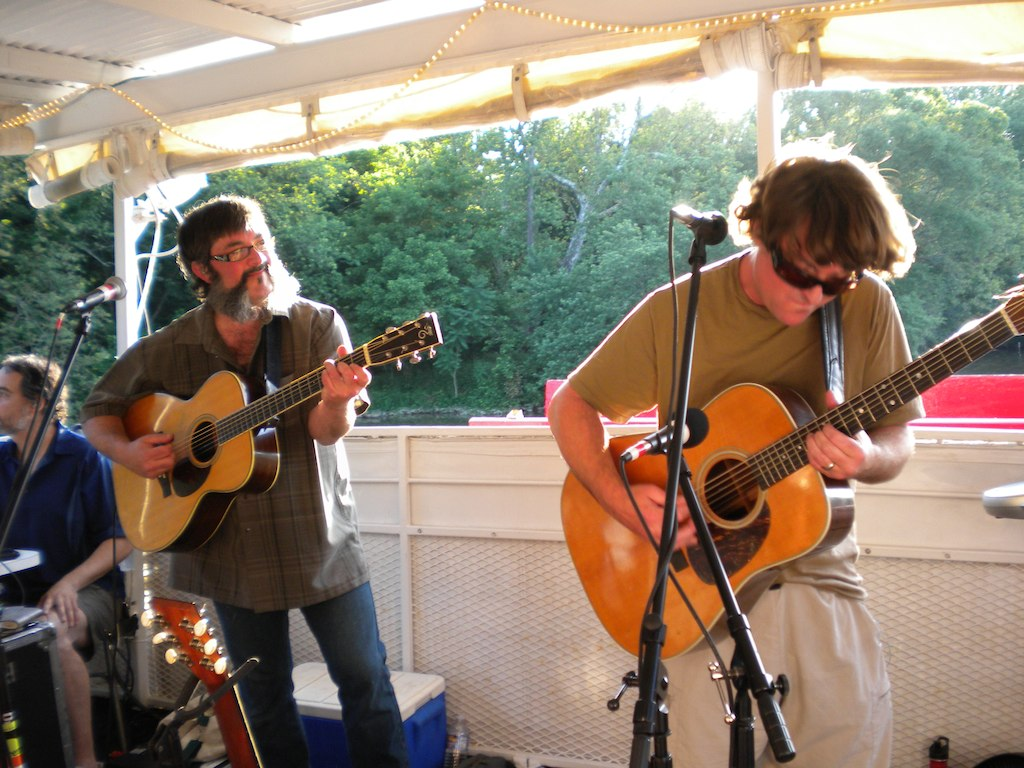
Larry Keel and Keller Williams jamming on a riverboat, May 25, 2010.

=== Keller Williams with Moseley, Droll and Sipe ===
Williams also frequently performs with a backing band as "Keller Williams with Moseley Droll and Sipe". Formed in 2007 as the WMDs, they first played at the Bonnaroo music festival. The group consists of Williams on rhythm guitar, Jeff Sipe on drums, Keith Moseley on bass, and Gibb Droll on lead guitar. They changed their name to the WMDs in 2008.

=== Keller and The Keels ===
"Keller & The Keels" is a bluegrass project consisting of Williams and the husband and wife combo of Larry Keel and Jenny Keel. The trio released Grass in 2006, a collection of both original and cover songs. They released Thief, an album of cover songs, in May 2010. A new album, "Pick", with The Travelin McCoury's, was released in July 2012.The most recent Keller and The Keels album is Speed, which was released in 2019. It features a Larry Keel song, a Keller song, and several covers.

== Instruments ==
A self-taught musician, Williams usually performs with a variety of instruments connected to a Boss Loop Station RC-300 phrase looper pedal, which allow him to play a riff once on an instrument, record, and repeat it. He also uses a Gibson Echoplex Digital Pro looping unit for that effect. He often then records and loops an accompanying instrument. This allows him to play unaccompanied on stage, helping him to recreate the sound of a full band. He also uses a wide variety of effects, including an envelope filter expression pedal, wah pedal, a Line 6 tap delay, a Roland GR-55 guitar synth, a Line 6 M13 Stompbox Modeler Guitar Multi Effects Pedal, and a Talk Box.

“I think a lot of times, I try to bring the audience in on the joke and make them part of the band, especially when it’s just me. There’s a real sense, when it’s all working, that the audience and myself, we’re all getting away with something. We’re all doing something really bad and illegal, and we’re getting away with it, because something this fun usually is.”

— Keller Williams

His main guitars used are a Martin HD-28 and D-35, an Alvarez/Joe Veillette MTB baritone, a Gibson Chet Atkins SST Acoustic Electric Guitar with synth pickup routed to a Roland synth processor, a Fender Precision bass, a Becker Acoustic Retro, an Avante baritone acoustic guitar, a Rick Turner baritone 12-string, a Tacoma Thunderhawk, an early 1950s tempo and a Gordon Anderson custom 8-string.

In addition, Williams incorporates a variety of acoustic and electric percussion instruments into his live sets, most notably a Roland Handsonic HDP-15 drum machine and a Korg Wavedrum. He also frequently performs on piano, a theremin, a Korg Kaossilator, a Macbook, and a set of Boomwhackers percussion tubes.

== Other projects ==
Williams is the host of the radio show Keller's Cellar.

In 2009, Williams started the "Once a Week Freek" on his website, where every week he released a new song from his album "Odd". Upon release of every song on the album, he released the entire album in one download. Due to the success of this idea, Williams chose to keep the "Once a Week Freek" project going and released a new song/video or two each week. These tracks consisted of live performances of previously recorded songs, unreleased covers of other bands' songs, or just different renditions of his own recorded music.

Williams played as a member of the Rhythm Devils with Grateful Dead drummers Bill Kreutzmann and Mickey Hart at the Gathering of the Vibes festival in 2010. Williams then appeared with the Rhythm Devils in nine July shows on their summer tour.

Kdubalicious is a project involving Keller Williams on bass/guitar, Jay Starling on dobro/keyboards, and Mark D on drums. Kdubalicious is Reggae/ Dub/ Funk. Keller's project Kdubalicious formed in late 2010, and the group continues to play occasional shows. There was a unique winter concert held on a turf field in Fredericksburg, VA featuring Kdubalicous with Larry Keel, Jenny Keel, and John Starling in December 2010.

== Discography ==
=== Albums ===
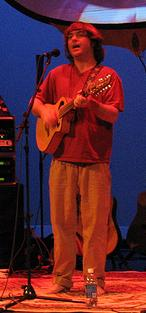
Keller Williams on February 3, 2006, at the Ridgefield Playhouse

- Freek (1994)
- Buzz (1995)
- Spun (1999)
- Breathe (1999) – (with The String Cheese Incident as Keller Williams Incident)
- Loop (live) (2001)
- Laugh (2002)
- Dance (2003)
- Home (2003)
- Stage (double live) (2004)
- Grass (2006) – (with Larry and Jenny Keel as Keller & The Keels)
- Dream (2007)
- 12 (2007)
- Rex (digital download) (2008) – (with Jeff Austin and Keith Moseley as Grateful Grass)
- Odd (2009)
- Thief (2010) – (with The Keels as Keller & The Keels)
- Kids (2010) (Children's Album)
- Bass (2011)
- Pick (2012), with The Travelin' McCourys
- Keys (2013), (Album of Grateful Dead covers played on Piano)
- Funk (2013), with More Than a Little
- Dos (2014) – (with Jeff Austin and Keith Moseley as Grateful Grass)
- Vape (2015)
- Raw (2017)
- Sans (2018)
- Add (2019)
- Speed (2019) (with Larry and Jenny Keel as Keller & the Keels)
- Cell (2020), (with Erothyme)
- Grit (2022)
- Droll (2023 ) Collaboration with Gibb Droll
- Deer (2024 )

=== Compilations ===
- High Times Presents Rip This Joint – Various Artists (2001)

=== Guest appearances ===
- Hellhound Blues - Pretty Gritty (2012)
- The J. Case Show – Julian Casellas (2010)
- Seeds – Martin Sexton (2007)
- Chateau Benares – Sanjay Mishra (2006)
- Collision – DJ Harry (2004)
- On The Road: 04-14-02 Ann Arbor, MI – The String Cheese Incident (2002)
- On The Road: 04-13-02 Chicago, IL – The String Cheese Incident (2002)
- Solar Igniter – Modereko (2001)

=== Videos ===
- Sight (2005, DVD)
