= The String Cheese Incident =

American jam band

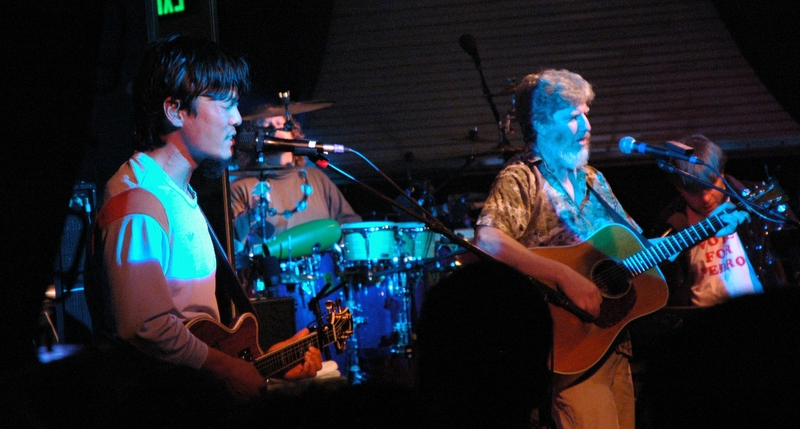

Background information
- Origin: Crested Butte, Colorado, US
- Genres: Jam band; progressive bluegrass; neo-psychedelia
- Years active: 1993–2007, 2009–present
- Label: SCI Fidelity
- Members: Bill Nershi; Michael Kang; Michael Travis; Keith Moseley; Kyle Hollingsworth; Jason Hann
- Website: www.stringcheeseincident.com

The String Cheese Incident (SCI) is an American jam band from Crested Butte and Telluride, Colorado, formed in 1993. The band is composed of Michael Kang (acoustic/electric mandolin, electric guitar, and violin), Michael Travis (drums and percussion), Bill Nershi (acoustic guitar, lap steel guitar, and electric slide guitar), Kyle Hollingsworth (piano, organ, Rhodes, and accordion), and Keith Moseley (bass guitar), and, since 2004, Jason Hann (auxiliary percussion).

Their music has elements of bluegrass sounds, as well as rock, electronica, calypso, country, funk, jazz, Latin, progressive rock, reggae, and psychedelia. All members write original compositions and sing.

== History ==
=== 1993–2001 ===
The original four members (Nershi, Kang, Travis and Moseley) first played together in Crested Butte, Colorado, in 1993, calling themselves the Blue String Cheese Band, because they considered themselves a bluegrass band who also played "cheesy covers". Soon after, they changed the name to the String Cheese Incident. In 1996 the members all quit their day jobs and moved to Boulder, Colorado, to focus on music. Around that time they decided that they wanted to add a keyboard player to the group, to expand their sound beyond string instruments, and invited Kyle Hollingsworth to join them.

After a few years of playing local ski resorts and private functions, the band formed SCI Fidelity, an independent record label on which they released their first album, Born on the Wrong Planet, containing originals and covers. The album features melody-driven music with room for improvisation. Instrumentals and covers constituted half of the album. Many songs from the first album are still frequently played by the band, including "Black Clouds", "Land's End", "Texas", and "Jellyfish".

Less than a year later, SCI released a compilation of ten songs, including "Land's End", on their self-titled live album A String Cheese Incident, which chronicles a single concert from the Fox Theatre in Boulder, Colorado, and adds pianist Hollingsworth to the ensemble (he was not in the band during the recording of Born on the Wrong Planet). Despite spanning only one disc and containing only ten tracks, the album clocks in at 72 minutes even (thus, with an average track length of 7:12, displaying their propensity for extended jams).

'Round the Wheel, released in 1998, refined the band's sound and displayed a marked increase in both musical and lyrical maturity, and added Paul McCandless as a guest player on soprano and tenor saxophone and Tony Furtado on banjo, but did not earn them quite the level of fame that they would achieve in the next millennium. From 1998 through 2001, SCI toured the country extensively and steadily, playing over 500 "Incidents" in hundreds of cities, including an appearance at Woodstock '99.

In 2001, with the help of guest producer and Los Lobos member Steve Berlin, they released their third studio effort, Outside Inside. This album marked a shift from the band's traditional bluegrass leanings to a more standard rock sound, thus making it the most accessible album to a mainstream audience to that point. The band did not completely abandon its bluegrass roots, however, sneaking in the short three-minute track "Up the Canyon" at the end of the disc, which has become one of many live favorites along with "Rollover", "Close Your Eyes", and others.

=== 2002–2004 ===
In August 2003, SCI's in-house ticket selling service, SCI Ticketing (now Baseline Ticketing), sued Ticketmaster, which controlled nearly all of the larger venues the band was playing. SCI alleged that by restricting bands from selling directly to fans more than 8% of a venue's tickets violated the Sherman Antitrust Act. The suit followed an unsuccessful petitioning by SCI, R.E.M., Pearl Jam and other bands calling for the U.S. Department of Justice to investigate Ticketmaster's high service fees and anti-competitive practices. The parties settled in 2008, and the band gained a larger allotment of tickets to sell and agreed to not publicize the settlement.

In October 2003, SCI released their fourth studio album, Untying the Not, produced by Martin "Youth" Glover, formerly of the band the Killing Joke. The release continued SCI's use of electronic music and trance elements. Both Travis and Kang got into electronic music around the same time and started pushing the group in that direction.

In the summer of 2004, SCI booked to play the touring festival Lollapalooza; thereby becoming the caravan's first jam band. But poor ticket sales led to the festival's cancellation and the band re-routed its summer tour.

=== 2005–2006 ===
In June 2005, the band released their fifth studio album, titled One Step Closer, containing thirteen original tracks with guest songwriting collaborations, including Jim Lauderdale. In 2005, the band also welcomed percussionist Jason Hann. The album was produced by Malcolm Burn at a studio in Boulder, Colorado, where the band is based. One Step Closer was a return to the more roots-based music of earlier String Cheese Incident fare, while still retaining some of the pop sensibility of previous studio albums.

Through Madison House Inc., the company that manages and books SCI, the band organized 'Big Summer Classic', a 2005 traveling festival tour across the United States. Seven-person ensemble New Monsoon opened the festival's shows, which included acts such as Umphrey's McGee, Yonder Mountain String Band, Michael Franti & Spearhead, and Keller Williams. The band played in medium-size outdoor venues, such as minor-league baseball parks.

In 2005, the band returned to their roots: playing shows at the base of ski resorts, summer festivals, smaller venues, and touring throughout the U.S. Band members announced to their fans that the band would take a break from touring in early 2006. They recommenced in the summer of the same year to play several co-headlining shows with Bob Weir's RatDog including a sold-out two-night run at Red Rocks in Morrison, Colorado, and a set at the 10,000 Lakes Festival in Minnesota with well-known acoustic artist Keller Williams.

=== 2007 ===
The band announced a few shows for 2007, including their annual Winter Carnival (sans 2006), which stopped in Denver and Vail, Colorado, and an appearance at the Bonnaroo Music Festival as well as the 10,000 Lakes Festival. The band concluded their reign among the jamband leadership circuit and rode out into the sunset with a series of shows at their favorite places (New York, San Francisco, Oregon), as well as a revival of the Big Summer Classic festival at Camp Zoe, culminating with a last blowout at Red Rocks Amphitheatre during August 9–12.

The band had re-recorded their song "Close Your Eyes" in Simlish, the native language of The Sims, that was included in the 5th Expansion Pack – Seasons.

=== 2008 ===
All members were present at the Rothbury Music Festival in Rothbury, Michigan, performing with their respective solo projects. The Kyle Hollingsworth Band and EOTO performed on Thursday, Panjea with Michael Kang and Keller Williams featuring Keith Moseley performed on Friday, and the Emmitt-Nershi Band performed on Saturday. Also, at Yarmony Grass Music Festival all members except for Keith got together and played Will it Go 'Round in Circles together, as well as Pretty Polly.

=== 2009 ===
On March 16, 2009, it was announced that the String Cheese Incident would reunite for the second annual Rothbury Festival. The band played an unannounced, invitation-only, "soundcheck" show at the Ogden Theatre in Denver on June 24.

In October 2009, Michael Travis told the Colorado Daily newspaper in Boulder: "We are going to be playing some shows next summer and fall. We're not sure about the dates, but we're definitely going to be playing. We're excited to put all we can into this incredible meeting of music, hearts and minds. It's going to be exciting to reunite for those shows."

=== 2010 ===
On February 2, 2010, it was announced that String Cheese Incident would reunite for seven shows in the summer — the first three being a weekend concert at Red Rocks Amphitheatre, then a four-night "Incident" at Horning's Hideout. The final stop on their 2010 calendar: a "Hulaween" weekend of Incidents on Friday, October 29, with the Disco Biscuits, and a three set night on October 30 at the Hampton Coliseum in Hampton, Virginia.

On October 20, 2010, Billy Nershi announced that, "[They're] also planning on doing something next summer at the Rothbury site. That will be a weekend festival with a lot of String Cheese sets. It'll be different from Rothbury in that it will be more like our thing at Horning's, where String Cheese plays every night, and it will include bands in [The] String Cheese family with art installations and that kind of thing".

=== 2011 ===
In 2011, String Cheese Incident played a three-night run March 10–12 at the 1st Bank Center in Broomfield, Colorado, which they called the "Winter Carnival 2011". The show featured live acrobatics and a costume contest for the attendees, as well as a Conscious Alliance food drive which offered a special edition 3-panel poster to anyone who donated 25 cans of food.

String Cheese played the Which Stage at Bonnaroo Music Festival in Manchester, Tennessee, on June 11, 2011. Later that summer, String Cheese was featured as a headliner for three out of four nights (July 1–3) of the opening year for the Electric Forest Festival, an event which the band hosted in Rothbury, Michigan.

On September 19, 2011, the band announced that they would be making a tour along America's East Coast (as well as two cities in the Midwest) entitled the Roots Run Deep 2011 Tour.

=== 2014 ===
In 2014 the String Cheese Incident released A Song In My Head, their first studio album since 2005. The album was produced by Talking Heads keyboard player Jerry Harrison.

The band toured briefly in support of its album, including a free concert in Boulder and an appearance at Delfest in Cumberland, Maryland.

=== 2015 ===
In June 2015, the String Cheese Incident invited Skrillex, a well-known American electronic music artist, to jam with them at the Electric Forest festival.

=== 2016–2017 ===
The String Cheese Incident continued to tour, and released the "Believe" recording in 2017.

=== 2018 ===
The band toured in 2018 as well, with performances at Dillon Amphitheater, The Ride Festival, Red Rocks Amphitheatre & Electric Forest festival. They also headlined the Suwannee Hulaween festival.

=== 2019 ===
The band released a live compilation of their shows in 2018 titled "2018 Travelogue". It was a 4 disc set and was available for free download on Nugs.net. This was also the year of their 25th Anniversary and they chose to celebrate it with more touring across the USA.

=== 2023 ===
The band released its first studio album in 6 years called "Lend Me a Hand"

The band also marked its 30th year since its formation with a New Year's Eve celebration concert at the Fox Theater in Oakland, California, from December 29 to 31, 2023.

== Stage productions and effects ==
As the band's popularity grew, so did the stage show and spectacle elements of many of their live shows. An organization called Peak Experience Productions was hired to add various eye psychedelia, and audience participatory activities, to larger "Incidents" such as New Year's Eve and Halloween (dubbed "Hulaween" due to the band's early connection to the modern hooping movement). Themed events such as "Full Moon Dream Dance, Evolution", "Dancing Around the Wheel of Time", a "Subway Ride Through New York City", and a "Time Traveler's Ball" are some examples.

During the 2000s, the band also established an annual summer event at Horning's Hideout in Oregon, bringing Peak Experience out into the woods to add to the circular energy and rapport between the band and its audience. At the same time, as the band's popularity grew, so did the sizes of the crowds coming to see them; SCI headlined festivals such as Bonnaroo, Austin City Limits and the Wakarusa Music and Camping Festival, and began playing in some larger venues to accommodate their growing fanbase.

SCI released live three-CD sets of all 19 shows that they played in April 2002 on their spring tour. In this regard, they are believed to have taken a cue from Phish's Live Phish series and stepped up the formula a notch by releasing every show instead of just select concerts. Not stopping with the spring tour, SCI has released nearly every song from every concert from every tour through the present, barring those where technical difficulties or contractual guest artist complications are involved. Christening the series On the Road, the shows are released on the SCI Fidelity label for fans who do not have the time or means to engage in active tape trading.

== Side projects ==
Michael Travis founded the acoustic trio, Zuvuya, with Jamie Janover and Xander Greene in 2001 and started the trance music band Zilla during 2003.

Bill Nershi and his wife Jillian started a bluegrass/acoustic band called Honkytonk Homeslice, which has toured across the US, especially in the West, and is scheduled to tour with Drew Emmitt of Leftover Salmon, Billed as The Emmitt-Nershi Band. Bill Nershi also fronts a side project called Billy Nershi's Blue Planet.

Kyle Hollingsworth plays with various side projects around Colorado including his own band, Kyle Hollingsworth, that plays SCI songs Kyle has written over the years as well as some of his other original pieces. His band features members of the Boulder-based group the Motet.

Michael Kang plays occasionally with Pangaea (African rooted band), and spends much of his off time travelling the world.

In 2006, Jason Hann and Michael Travis started a live looping project called EOTO. One time throughout their 2008 tour they were joined by Kyle Hollingsworth and Michael Kang making it everyone from SCI except Bill Nershi and Keith Moseley. These four played together on August 6, 2011 at Yarmony Grass Music Festival 2011 in Rancho del Rio, Colorado, under the moniker "The Trancident." The group went on tour in 2012 with a psychedelic "Lotus Flower" stage designed by Zebbler. EOTO disbanded in 2021.

In 2007, Keith Moseley toured with Keller Williams in Keller's newly formed band: Keller Williams with Moseley, Droll and Sipe (formerly the WMDs). He also performed with Keller as part of Grateful Grass, a project performing bluegrass covers of songs by the Grateful Dead and releasing a live album in support of the Rex Foundation.

In 2022, Michael Travis and Aaron Johnston (Brazilian Girls, David Byrne's American Utopia) founded the improvisational duo Snakes & Stars.

== Personnel ==
=== Members ===
Current members

- Bill Nershi — acoustic guitar, lap steel guitar, and electric slide guitar
- Michael Kang — acoustic/electric mandolin, electric guitar, and violin
- Michael Travis — drums and percussion
- Keith Moseley — bass guitar
- Kyle Hollingsworth — piano, organ, Rhodes, and accordion
- Jason Hann — auxiliary percussion (2006—present)

All members also perform lead vocals on select songs.

== Discography ==
=== Albums ===
- Born on the Wrong Planet (1997)
- A String Cheese Incident (1997)
- 'Round the Wheel (1998)
- Breathe – with Keller Williams (1999)
- Carnival '99 (2000)
- Outside Inside (2001)
- Untying the Not (2003)
- One Step Closer (2005)
- Song in My Head (2014)
- Believe (April 14, 2017)
- Lend Me a Hand (September 8, 2023)

=== Singles ===
- "Get to You" (2018)
- "I Want You" (2018)
- "Otherside" (2018)
- "Vertigo" (2018)
- "The Big Reveal" (2018)
- "Gone Crooked" (2018)
- "Illegal" (2018)
- "Manga" (2018)
- "Bhangra Saanj" (2019)
- "All We Got" (2019)
- "Boo Boo's Pik-a-Nik" (2019)
- "Stories for Another Day" (2019)
- "Top Down" (2020)
- "Hi Ho No Show" (2021)
- "Lend Me a Hand" (2023)
- "One More Time" (2023)
- "Eventually" (2023)
- "Ain't I Been Good to You" (2023)
- "Enjoy the Ride" (2023)
- "Windy Mountain" (2024)
- "Country Road Blues" (2024)
- "Roll Around the Sun" (2024)

=== EPs ===
- Into the Blue (2022)

=== Live series ===
- On the Road (2002–2007)
- Rhythm of the Road: Vol. 1, Incident in Atlanta – 11.17.00 (2010)
- Rhythm of the Road, Vol. 2: Live in Las Vegas – July 2001 (2015)

=== Videos ===
- Pura Vida (2001, VHS)
- Evolution (2001, VHS & DVD)
- Bonnaroo Live (2002, DVD)
- Waiting For the Snow to Fall (2003, DVD)
- Live at the Fillmore Auditorium, Denver: March 23, 2002 (2003, two-disc DVD)
- The Big Compromise (2005 bonus DVD, the making of "One Step Closer", 30 minute preview)
- Live from Austin, Texas (2006, DVD)
- Live from Rothbury Music Festival 2009 (2009, [live stream])

=== Other contributions ===
- 107.1 KGSR Radio Austin – Broadcasts Vol.10 (2002) – "Up the Canyon"
