= Keith Moseley =

American musician and songwriter (born 1965)

Keith Moseley (born February 5, 1965) is an American musician and songwriter, who plays bass guitar among other instruments for The String Cheese Incident, a jam band from Boulder, Colorado, of which he is a founding member.

He has written and provides vocals for a number of songs for the band, including "Resume Man", "Joyful Sound" and "Sometimes a River". Before forming The String Cheese Incident, Moseley played guitar in the band Whiskey Creek Warriors, which played around the Colorado ski scene.

Equipment

Moseley primarily plays a Lakland 55-94 that he got in 1999. However, he also plays a variety of Fender Precision Basses. For amplification, Moseley uses Aguilar. He currently uses a pair of Aguilar DB751 heads and a pair of DB412 speaker cabinets. He occasionally will perform solo acts, playing acoustic versions of String Cheese Incident songs, and covers. He plays a Martin Dreadnaught acoustic while playing these gigs.

== Side projects ==
In February 2006, Moseley recorded Rex (Live at the Fillmore), a live album under the band name Grateful Grass, featuring fellow musicians Keller Williams and Jeff Austin (Yonder Mountain String Band). Available only for digital download, the album featured non-traditional bluegrass versions of songs by the Grateful Dead, with 100% of the proceeds going to the Rex Foundation. In 2007 he joined Keller Williams' for a project called The WMD's, or Keller Williams with Moseley, Droll and Sipe. In 2010 Keith released a record with The Contribution, a band whose collaborators include Tim Carbone of Railroad Earth as well as members of New Monsoon.
