= Bill Nershi =

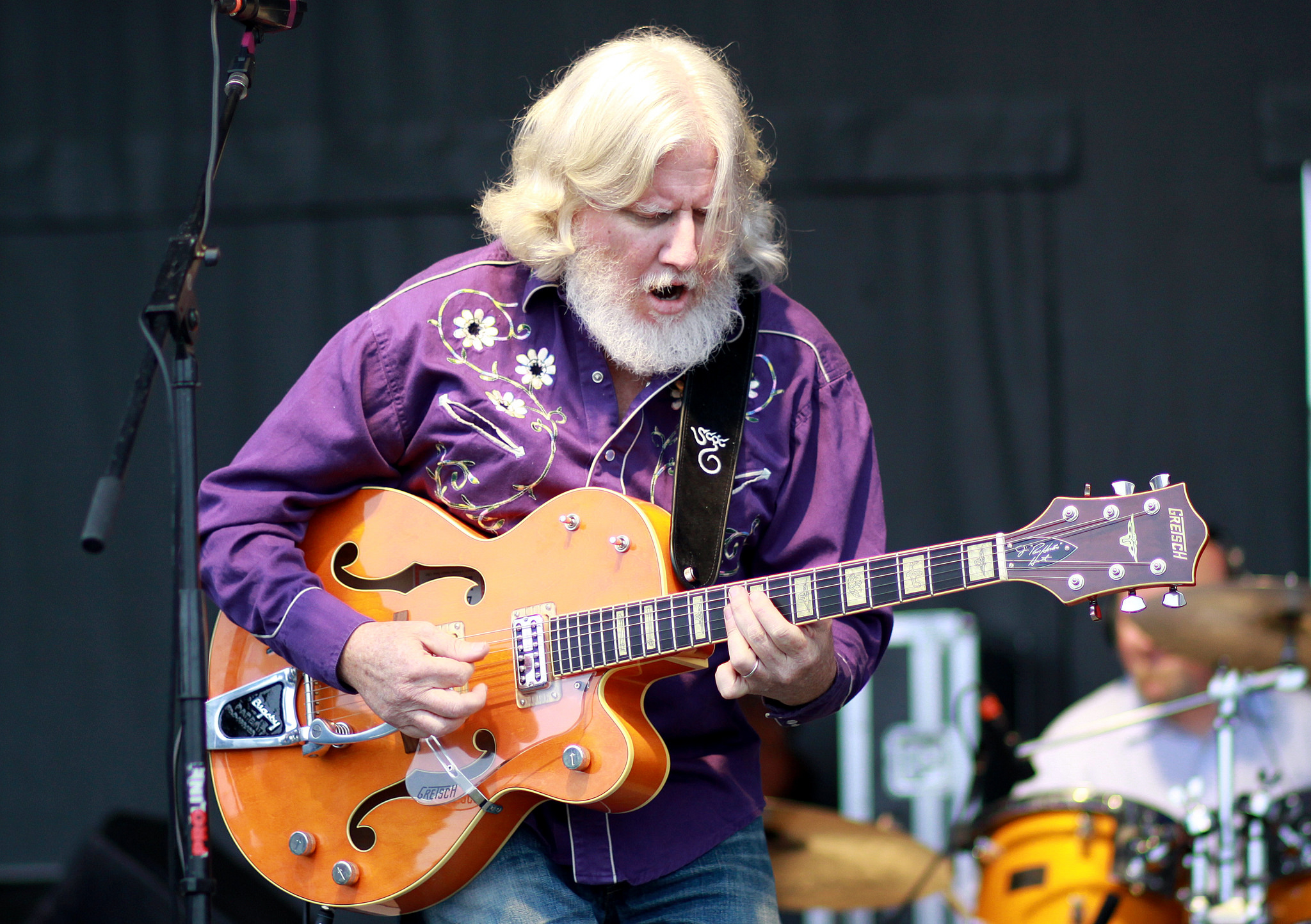
- Nershi performs at Nedfest 2014 in Nederland, Colorado.

Background information
- Birth name: William J. Nershi
- Born: September 16, 1961 (age 63); New Jersey, U.S.
- Genres: Rock; bluegrass; country
- Occupation: Guitarist
- Instrument: Guitar

William J. “Bill” Nershi (born September 16, 1961), is a founding member and acoustic guitarist for The String Cheese Incident, from Boulder, Colorado. The String Cheese Incident took a break starting in the summer of 2007, but the band got back together in 2009. Nershi is currently active in multiple projects, including SCI, Honkytonk Homeslice as well as a project with Leftover Salmon mandolinist Drew Emmitt, known as the Emmitt-Nershi Band. He currently lives in Colorado and is also a visual artist.
