= Kyle Hollingsworth =

American rock keyboard player

Kyle Hollingsworth (born March 2, 1968) is an American rock keyboard player best known for playing in The String Cheese Incident. He sings and plays electric piano, Hammond organ, clavinet, synthesizer and accordion. He also leads a solo project, Kyle Hollingsworth Band, that consistently tours throughout the year as well. In addition to touring with his solo project, Hollingsworth has released several solo EPs and albums.

Hollingsworth is also an avid home brewer of craft beer, having released a specially brewed "Hoppingsworth IPA" on September 14, 2009, most notably. Over the years, Hollingsworth has hosted a number of beer-themed events and concerts spotlighting local breweries in addition to consistently brewing collaborative beers with local and nationally distributed breweries.

== Early life and career ==
Hollingsworth was born in Maryland, United States. He attended Towson State University where he majored in music, with a focus on jazz piano. While attending college, Hollingsworth played in the Baltimore-based psychedelic rock band, Black Friday.

After moving to Boulder, Colorado, he eventually joined The String Cheese Incident, an American jamband from Boulder. He has written a number of songs for the band, by himself and with collaborators such as Robert Hunter.

== Solo career ==
When not on tour with String Cheese Incident, he tours with his band, the Kyle Hollingsworth Band. He has also toured under the names 'Kyle Hollingsworth & Friends' and '3 Foot Icon', the latter featuring him, Speech (of Arrested Development), and Chief Xcel (Blackalicious). Additionally, Hollingsworth frequently jams with groups such as Mat Butler's Everyone Orchestra, T3 (ft. Michael Travis, Jason Hann, and The Floozies' Matt Hill), and others throughout the year.

Hollingsworth released his first solo album, Never Odd or Even, in 2004. The album features saxophonist Joshua Redman and pedal steel player Robert Randolph. During this time, He toured in support of Never Odd or Even under the name Remarkable Elba Kramer.

In 2007, Hollingsworth toured with The Mickey Hart Band, featuring Steve Kimock, George Porter Jr. and Mickey Hart of the Grateful Dead

In the spring of 2008, Hollingsworth toured briefly with the Fiery Furnaces as the band's second keyboard player.

His second album, Then There's Now, was released on September 15, 2009. The album features Dave Watts (of the Motet) on drums, Ryan Jalbert on Guitar, Garrett Sayers on bass, and Damien Hines and DJ Logic on turntables. It also features Liza Oxnard (of Zuba) and Alex Botwin (of Pnuma Trio).

In 2014, he released his third album, Speed of Life. Speed of Life spurned some of Hollingsworth's biggest solo tracks to date in "Falling Through The Cracks" and "You've Got The World" and even featured Dominic Lalli on "Peregrino."

In 2018, Hollingsworth released his fourth album, 50. The 12-track album features hits such as "All Falls Apart" and "Stuff" and boasts collaborations with a variety artists such as Jason Hann, Gabriel Mervine, Drew Sayers, Kim Dawson, Andy Hall, Jennifer Hartswick, DJ Logic, and more.

In February 2020, he brought his solo band, Kyle Hollingsworth Band, up to Alaska as part of his BrewSki Tour. The run featured shows at both Klondike Mike's in Palmer, AK, and the Alyeska Resort, in Girdwood, AK, alongside collaboration brews with Bearpaw River Brewing Company and Girdwood Brewing Company, respectively.

February 28, 2020 saw the release of Hollingsworth's most recent EP, aptly titled 2020. The EP features Lyle Divinsky (of The Motet) on the reggae-inspired "Got It Figured Out" as well a cover of "Step," by the Vampire Weekend.

== Discography ==
- Never Odd or Even (2004)
- Then There's Now (2009)
- Speed of Life (2014)
- 50 (2018)
- 2020 (2020)
