= Michael Kang (musician) =

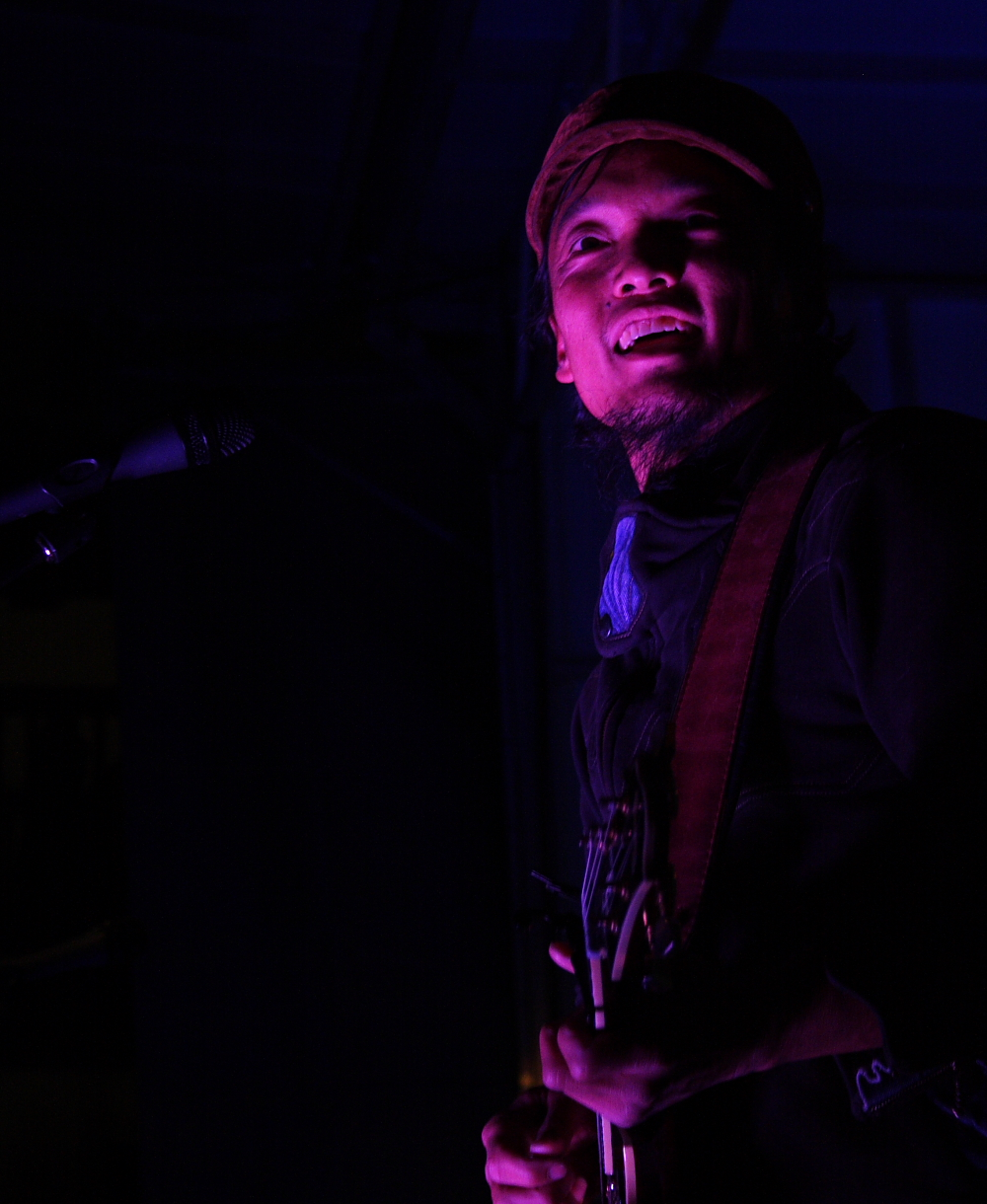
- Michael Kang performing in Vail, Colorado

Background information
- Born: 13 May 1971 (age 54); South Korea
- Genres: Jam band, Alternative rock
- Occupations: Musician, songwriter
- Instruments: Mandolin, violin, guitar
- Label: Columbia

Michael Kang, (born May 13, 1971, South Korea) is a multi-instrumentalist for the jam band The String Cheese Incident (often abbreviated to SCI).

The mandolin is his primary instrument, although he plays violin on several songs, and electric mandolin on many others. He provides both a melodic and rhythmic sound. Kang has lived in South Korea, Indonesia, England, Germany, New York City, San Francisco Bay Area (California), United Arab Emirates, Alaska, and Colorado. He is a graduate of UC-Berkeley, a former emergency medical technician, and a former ski patrolman in Steamboat Springs, CO.

== Side projects ==
In addition to his role in SCI, Kang has participated in several side projects, among these was the 2000 album Head West by the collaboration called Comotion. Musicians joining Kang in the studio included Jeff Sipe and Tye North of Leftover Salmon, progressive bluegrass musicians Paul McCandless, Darol Anger, and Mike Marshall, and drummer Aaron Johnson. He also can be found playing with the band Panjea and with Chris Berry.

== Training and early musicianship ==
Kang started his musical career playing violin. Without pressure from his parents, he began by appreciating classics. In high school, he began to explore different types of music and was heavily impacted by Neil Young, the Grateful Dead, Crosby, Stills & Nash, and Led Zeppelin, which you can hear in his playing with the SCI. During a trip to Alaska in 1990, Michael discovered bluegrass music and started playing the mandolin.
