= SCI Fidelity Records =

Formed in 1998, SCI Fidelity Records is an independent record label based in Boulder, Colorado. It is owned and managed by the jam band The String Cheese Incident.

== Artists ==
SCI Fidelity artists include Keller Williams, Umphrey's McGee, The Disco Biscuits, Railroad Earth, Younger Brother, Lotus, The Infamous Stringdusters, EOTO, Emmitt-Nershi Band, Kyle Hollingsworth, The New Deal, The Greyboy Allstars, 30db, Tea Leaf Green, The Radiators, Steve Kimock Band, Brothers Past, New Monsoon and DJ Harry.

== Staff ==
Kevin Morris – Consigliere

Matt Hogan – General Manager

Allie Hamby – Project Manager

Dave Hearn – Digital & Grassroots Marketing

Larry Fox – OTR Project Manager

Carrie Lombardi – Publicity

JD Tulloch – Daily Operations
