= Umphrey's McGee discography =

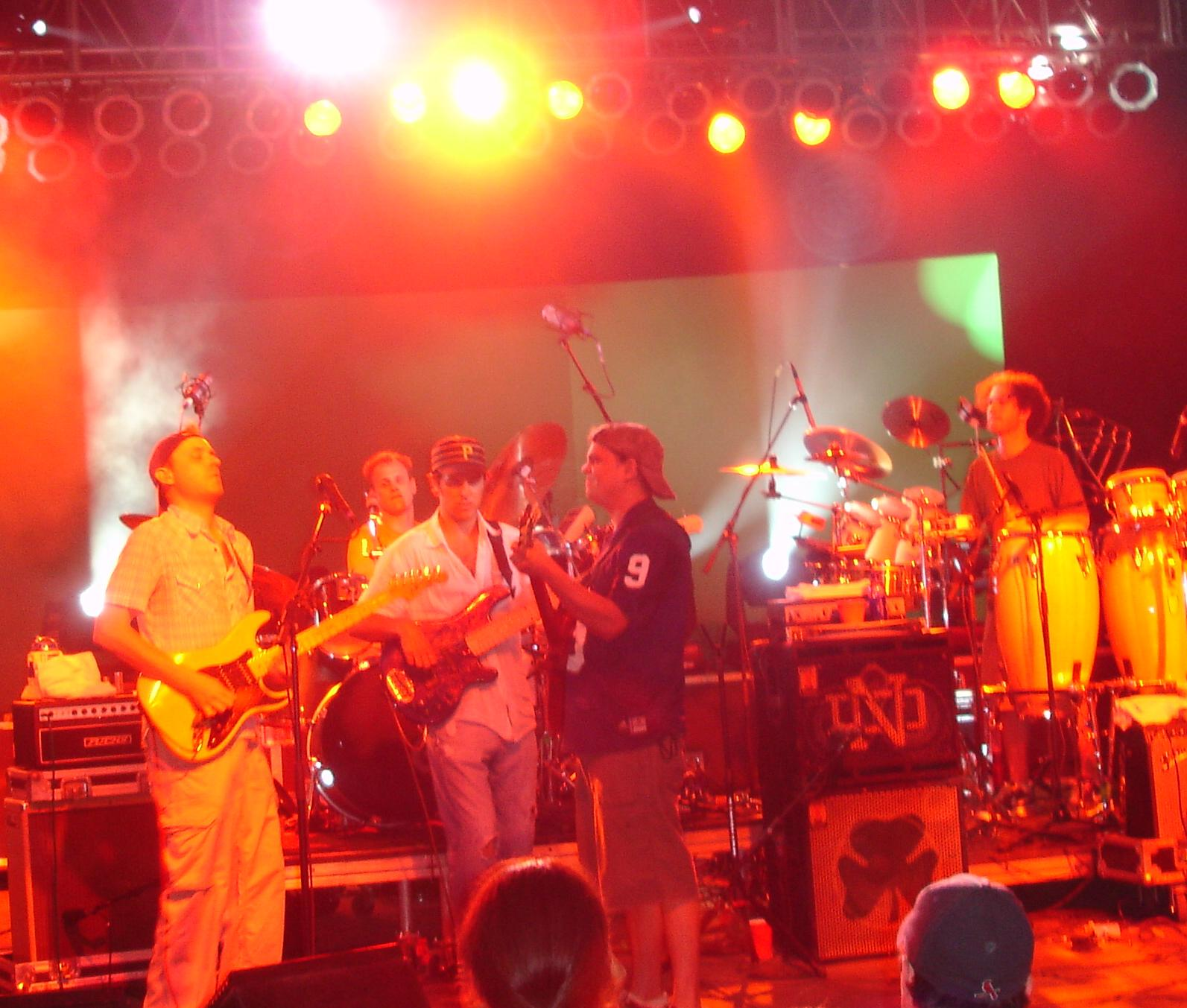
- Studio albums: 12
- Extended plays: 2
- Live albums: 10
- Video albums: 4

Umphrey's McGee is an American progressive rock / jam band based in Chicago, Illinois, and founded in South Bend, Indiana, at the University of Notre Dame in 1997 by vocalist/guitarist Brendan Bayliss, bassist Ryan Stasik, keyboardist Joel Cummins, and drummer Mike Mirro. Their discography consists of seven studio albums (including a two-disc set of demos and studio leftovers), ten official live albums, two extended play, and four video albums. The band is known for their live shows and extensive touring, and nearly every live show they have performed is recorded and made available for purchase on CD or as a digital download.

Umphrey's McGee's first three albums are currently out of print in physical format. Their first proper recording, Local Band Does OK, was released in 2002, and the companion live album, Local Band Does OKlahoma, in 2003. Anchor Drops followed in 2004, the band's first release on an official record label. 2006 saw the release of Safety In Numbers, which charted at number 186 on the US Billboard 200, and featured artwork by Storm Thorgerson, known for his work with such artists as Pink Floyd, Led Zeppelin, Dream Theater, and Muse. Demos and leftover tracks from Safety in Numbers were released in 2007 as a two-disc set titled The Bottom Half. Between 2007 and 2008, the band released two official two-disc live albums, Live at the Murat and Jimmy Stewart 2007, the latter being a compilation of live improvisations from selected shows. Mantis was released in 2009, and Death by Stereo in 2011, both receiving moderate chart success. Tracks from Death by Stereo were remixed and released as the EP Death by Remix in 2012.

== Studio albums ==
Year	Album details	Peak chart positions			
Year	Album details	US 200	Heat.	Rock	Indie
1998	Greatest Hits Vol. III: Released: May 15, 1998; Label: Umphrey's McGee; Format: CD	—	—	—	—
2002	Local Band Does OK: Released: June 21, 2002; Label: Umphrey's McGee; Format: CD	—	—	—	—
2004	Anchor Drops: Released: June 29, 2004; Label: SCI Fidelity; Format: CD	—	—	—	—
2006	Safety in Numbers: Released: April 4, 2006; Label: SCI Fidelity; Format: CD, LP	186	11	—	16
2007	The Bottom Half: Released: April 3, 2007; Label: SCI Fidelity; Format: CD, LP	—	7	—	22
2009	Mantis: Released: January 20, 2009; Label: SCI Fidelity; Format: CD, LP, digital	62	—	21	6
2011	Death by Stereo: Released: September 13, 2011; Label: ATO Records; Format: CD, LP, digital	—	—	22	17
2014	Similar Skin: Released: June 10, 2014; Label: Nothing Too Fancy Music; Format: CD, LP, digital	49	—	20	14
2015	The London Session: Released: April 7, 2015; Label: Nothing Too Fancy Music; Format: CD, LP, digital	—	—	37	22
2016	Zonkey: Released: November 15, 2016; Label: Nothing Too Fancy Music; Format: CD, LP, digital	—	—	26	16
2018	It's Not Us: Released: January 16, 2018; Label: Nothing Too Fancy Music; Format: CD, LP, digital	43	—	—	7
2018	It's You: Released: May 22, 2018; Label: Nothing Too Fancy Music; Format: CD, digital	—	—	—	—
2021	You Walked Up Shaking in Your Boots But You Stood Tall And Left A Raging Bull: Released: July 16, 2021; Label: Nothing Too Fancy Music; Format: LP	—	—	—	—
2022	Asking for a Friend: Released: July 1, 2022; Label: Nothing Too Fancy Music; Format: LP, digital	—	—	—	—
2025	Blueprints: Released: September 12, 2025; Label: Nothing Too Fancy Music; Format: LP, digital	—	—	—	—

== Live albums ==
Year	Album details	Peak chart positions		
Year	Album details	US 200	Heat.	Indie
1999	Songs for Older Women: Released: 1999; Label: Umphrey's McGee; Format: CD	—	—	—
2000	One Fat Sucka: Released: 2000; Label: Umphrey's McGee; Format: CD	—	—	—
2003	Local Band Does OKlahoma: Released: 2003; Label: Umphrey's McGee; Format: CD	—	—	—
2005	Jimmy Stewart – The Album: Released: 2005; Label: Umphrey's McGee; Format: Digital	—	—	—
2006	Jimmy Stewart – The Second Album: Released: 2006; Label: Umphrey's McGee; Format: Digital	—	—	—
2007	Live at the Murat: Released: October 16, 2007; Label: SCI Fidelity; Format: CD	—	8	37
2008	Jimmy Stewart 2007: Released: June 17, 2008; Label: SCI Fidelity; Format: CD	—	—	—
2008	Cover It: Released: 2008; Label: Umphrey's McGee; Format: Digital	—	—	—
2011	Hall of Fame: Class of 2010: Released: June 28, 2011; Label: Umphrey's McGee; Format: 2LP, CD, digital	—	—	—
2012	Hall of Fame: Class of 2011: Released: August 21, 2012; Label: Hanging Brains Music; Format: 2LP, CD, digital	—	—	—
2013	Hall of Fame: Class of 2012: Released: October 7, 2013; Label: Umphrey's McGee; Format: 2LP, CD, digital	—	—	—
2014	Hall of Fame: Class of 2013: Released: September 23, 2014; Label: Nothing Too Fancy Music; Format: 2LP, CD, digital	—	—	—
2015	Hall of Fame: Class of 2014: Released: October 9, 2015; Label: Nothing Too Fancy Music; Format: 2LP, CD, digital	—	—	—

== Singles and EPs ==
Year	Album details
2009	Turn & Dub (Michael G Easy Star All-Stars Remix): Released: 2009; Label: Umphrey's McGee; Format: digital
2012	Death by Remix: Released: 2012; Label: Umphrey's McGee; Format: digital
2014	Reskinned: Released: 2014; Label: Umphrey's McGee; Format: digital
2018	It's Not Them: Released: 2018; Label: Umphrey's McGee; Format: digital

== Video releases ==
Year	Album details
2003	Live from the Lake Coast: Released: November 18, 2003; Format: DVD
2005	Wrapped Around Chicago – New Year's Eve at The Riviera: Released: November 8, 2005; Format: DVD
2009	Soundstage: Umphrey's McGee – Live: Released: June 2, 2009; Format: DVD
2012	Live from the Pageant: NYE Weekend 2011: Released: May 7, 2012; Format: DVD
