= Jammy Award =

Jam band award show

The Jammy Award (also known as the Jammys) is an awards show for bands - referred to as jam bands - and other artists associated with live, improvisational music, created by Dean Budnick and Peter Shapiro. The Jammys are sponsored by Relix magazine, Jambands.com, and Shapiro. The Jammy Awards returned in 2008 to the WAMU Theater at Madison Square Garden in New York City after taking a one-year break.

== First Annual Jammy Awards (2000) ==
The First Annual Jammy Awards were held on June 22, 2000, at Irving Plaza in New York City. The event was presented by Jambands.com and executive producers Peter Shapiro and Dean Budnick. Shapiro, who owns the Wetlands Preserve, is the publisher of Jambands.com. Budnick is editor in chief of Jambands.com and also co-hosted The Jammys with Peter Prince of Moon Boot Lover. The evening had two basic components: awards were presented in various categories, and the scene's best bands performed sets of blistering music with special guests. The idea originated nearly 10 months prior in a conversation between Budnick and managers for various bands. John Topper from Moe, Bob Kennedy from Deep Banana Blackout, and Darren Cohen from The Slip had all referenced "The Jammys" as an obvious play on "The Grammys."

Presenters included: Steve Bloom (High Times), Richard Gehr (The Village Voice), Lee Crumpton (Home Grown Music Network founder), Sam Kopper (first program director at WBCN in Boston, Phoenix Presents live engineer), John Scofield, Anthony DeCurtis (Rolling Stone, VH1), Kirk West (The Allman Brothers Band archivist), and Jambands.com staff members.

Strangefolk closed the show joined by Merl Saunders for a Grateful Dead tribute in which they performed "Scarlet Begonias", then Strangefolk's Eric Glocker was replaced on stage with Percy Hill's John Leccese, at which point they jammed into "Fire on the Mountain."

=== Performers ===
The Jammy Awards featured performers including The New Deal (band), Frogwings, The Disco Biscuits & Les Claypool, Merl Saunders, John Scofield, Strangefolk, Susan Tedeschi, Deep Banana Blackout, Soulive and The Slip.

=== Award winners ===
- Live Set of the Year: Phish – 12/31/99, Set II
- Jam of the Year: Disco Biscuits – "Akira Jam", 12/31/99
- Release of the Year: Grateful Dead – So Many Roads (1965-1995)
- Live Album of the Year: moe. – L
- Wetlands Award (Lifetime Achievement): B. B. King
- Studio Album of the Year: Percy Hill – Color in Bloom
- Future Jam (musicians' award): Soulive
- New Groove of the Year: Fat Mama
- Home Grown Music Award: Strangefolk
- Radio Show: The Music Never Stops (Barry Smolin, KPFK, Los Angeles, California)
- Fan Web Site: etree
- Community Service: Strangers Helping Strangers
- Topper Award (commitment to the scene): Chris Zahn
- Jambands.com Writer: Jeff Waful

== Second Annual Jammy Awards (2001) ==
The Second Annual Jammys took place at Roseland Ballroom in New York City. The show featured more than five hours of non-stop music and presentations. "The idea for the Jammys was to create a night of music where we didn't know what was going to happen," says Jammys executive producer Peter Shapiro. "We wanted to bring artists who not only hadn't played together, but hadn't met and now, after experiencing what went down, it's a pretty overwhelming feeling."

=== Performers ===
Col. Bruce Hampton, Yonder Mountain String Band's Jeff Austin (mandolin) and Robert Randolph (pedal steel) joined the Derek Trucks Band for a version of "Turn On Your Lovelight". Paul Shaffer sat in with Les Claypool's Fearless Flying Frog Brigade featuring Junior Brown for The Beatles' "Taxman" and King Crimson's "Thela Hun Ginjeet". DJ Logic and guitarist Stanley Jordan performed with The Disco Biscuits featuring John Popper for Jane's Addiction's "Three Days" and Led Zeppelin's "Bring It On Home". The show concluded with a two-stage dueling jam on The Meters' classic "Cissy Strut", which followed the presentation of the lifetime achievement award to George Porter Jr. The song featured the Derek Trucks Band with special guests Porter (bass, the Meters), Popper (vocals, harmonica, Blues Traveler) and Jordan (guitar).

=== Winners ===
- Album of the Year: Phish – Farmhouse
- Live Performance of the Year: Phish – 7/11/00, Noblesville, IN
- New Groove of the Year: Yonder Mountain String Band
- Radio Show: Jam Nation (Radio 104, Hartford, CT)
- Fan Website: etree
- Festival: Gathering of the Vibes
- Topper/Zahn Award: Howie Schnee
- Mimi Fishman Memorial Award: Mockingbird Foundation
- Live Album: Les Claypool's Fearless Flying Frog Brigade – Live Frogs Set 1
- Jam of the Year: Phil Lesh and Friends with Mike Gordon – 12-31-00
- Release of the Year: Grateful Dead – Ladies and Gentlemen... the Grateful Dead
- Lifetime Achievement: George Porter Jr. and the Meters

== Third Annual Jammy Awards (2002) ==
The Third Annual Jammy Awards were held October 2, 2002. It was presented by TDK, and took place at the Roseland Ballroom in New York City.

=== Performers ===
The evening began with Rat Dog bassist Rob Wasserman and DJ Logic . Next was Rusted Root, DJ Logic and guitarist Melvin Sparks, who played "Send Me on My Way" and "Ecstasy", with host John Popper (Blues Traveler) adding harmonica. John Scofield was joined by saxophonist Skerik (Critters Buggin, Les Claypool’s Frog Brigade), drummer Stanton Moore (Galactic, Garage A Trois) and bassist Andy Hess (Gov't Mule). Pedal Steel guitarist Robert Randolph sat in with the Blind Boys of Alabama for "Amazing Grace". Unannounced guest John Mayer collaborated with Randolph and Derek Trucks. Particle and Fred Schneider and Kate Pierson of the B-52's played "Planet Claire", "Private Idaho" and "Love Shack". Original Blue Öyster Cult members Eric Bloom (vocals), Buck Dharma (guitar) and Allen Lanier (guitar, keyboards) took the stage as Moe was finishing "Rebubula" and segued into "(Don't Fear) The Reaper." Reid Genauer, Jessica Lurie (Living Daylights) and Hope Clayburn (Deep Banana Blackout) joined house band The Tom Tom Club for "Take Me to the River". Bassist Stefan Lessard (Dave Matthews Band) played "Beautifully Broken" with Gov't Mule, before the Allman Brothers Band took the stage.

Rat Dog's set was capped by the dual stage jam, which closed out the show with a version of "Turn on Your Lovelight," with countless musicians on both stages. Rat Dog was joined on the main stage by guitarist Trey Anastasio (Phish), Warren Haynes (Gov't Mule, The Allman Brothers Band), Al Schnier (Moe), Popper, Abts, and DJ Logic. Meanwhile, the second stage included bassist Mike Gordon (Phish), guitarist Fuzz (Deep Banana Blackout), Randolph, saxophonists Skerik, Clayburn, Lurie, Tom Tom Club vocalists Mystic Bowie and Victoria Clamp and "Flute Girl."

=== Winners ===
- TDK Live Performance of the Year: moe. – Bonnaroo Music Festival, 6/22/02
- Tour of the Year: Trey Anastasio – Summer 2002
- Studio Album of the Year: Trey Anastasio – Trey Anastasio
- Live Album of the Year: Widespread Panic – Live in the Classic City
- Archival Album: Phish – Live Phish Vol. 11: 11/17/97, McNichols Sports Arena, Denver, CO
- Song of the Year: Gov't Mule – "Soulshine"
- New Groove of the Year: Robert Randolph and the Family Band
- Fan Website of the Year: Philzone.com
- Lifetime Achievement Award: Grateful Dead (presented by essay contest winner Bill Stites)
- Mimi Fishman Community Service Award: Joshua Stack (Panic Fans For Food)
- Grahamy Jammy (industry award for support of the scene): Annabel Lukins

== Fourth Annual Jammy Awards (2004) ==
The Fourth Annual Jammy Awards were held on March 16, 2004 at Madison Square Garden. It is most notable for the reunion of Black Crowes members Chris Robinson, Rich Robinson and Eddie Harsch which led to their revival of the Crowes in early 2005.

=== Performers ===
The night kicked off with a performance of “Higher & Higher” by the Harlem Gospel Choir, which was soon joined by an expanded version of Soulive. The trio welcomed vocalist Reggie Watts of Maktub, trumpeter Rashawn Ross, tenor saxophonist Ryan Zoidis, alto saxophonist Cochemea “Cheme” Gastelum and percussionist Danny Sadownick. Next up was Reid Genauer and the Assembly of Dust with Dickey Betts and Edie Brickell.

The Disco Biscuits launched into their own "Rock Candy." Flavor Flav was originally scheduled to join the band, but he respectfully declined during the last week. So instead, Slick Rick came out and after Rock Candy, Rick and The Biscuits performed La Di Da Di. Rahzel was then booked, but could not make the gig due to a snowstorm in the Northeast. Dr. John, Toots Hibbert (Toots and Maytals), bassist George Porter Jr. (the Meters), guitarist Brian Stoltz (the Meters), and drummer Matt Abts (Gov't Mule) then took the stage for a set that included "Right Place, Wrong Time", "Pressure Drop" and "Hey Pocky Way," with Widespread Panic keyboardist JoJo Hermann on the latter.

The Derek Trucks Band featured vocalist Solomon Burke for "I wish I knew How it Would Feel to be Free" and "Home in Your Heart." Trucks’ wife, Susan Tedeschi, along with Dickey Betts, then joined in for "Turn on Your Lovelight." The String Cheese Incident opened its portion of the night with the instrumental "Valley of the Jig" and "’Round the Wheel." Jane's Addiction front man Perry Farrell then emerged for "Idiots Rule," which also included the Soulive horn section. Following Gov't Mule’s "Blind Man in the Dark," Black Crowes members Chris Robinson, Rich Robinson and Eddie Harsch shared the stage for "Sometimes Salvation." It was their first performance together since October 2001. The Crowes have been officially on hiatus since January 2002. This was one of the reasons that the band got back together in 2005. Earlier in the set, Chris Robinson joined the Mule for a rendition of Neil Young’s "Southern Man",

Lifetime Achievement Award recipient Steve Winwood and his band took the stage for the evening’s finale, which opened with "Different Light." For the final jam of the night, Betts and The String Cheese Incident’s Michael Kang returned to the stage, along with the show’s host, Robert Randolph, who played guitar, and saxophonist James Carter for "Gimme Some Lovin'", one of Winwood's oldest hits, which he wrote at age 15 while in The Spencer Davis Group.

=== Winners ===
- Lifetime Achievement Award: Steve Winwood
- Live Album of the Year: Gov't Mule – The Deepest End
- Studio Album of the Year: moe. – Wormwood
- Song of the Year: The Allman Brothers Band – "Old Before My Time"
- Archival Live Album of the Year: Grateful Dead – The Closing of Winterland
- Live Performance of the Year: Gov't Mule with Les Claypool, Bela Fleck, Sonny Landreth, George Porter Jr., Dave Schools, Victor Wooten and more – Saenger Theatre, New Orleans, LA, 5/3/03
- Tour of the Year: Phish – Summer 2003
- DVD of the Year: Dave Matthews Band – The Central Park Concert
- Album Cover of the Year: The String Cheese Incident – Untying the Knot by Alex Gray
- New Groove of the Year: The Breakfast (formerly Psychedelic Breakfast)
- Mimi Fishman Memorial Community Service Award: Justin Baker (Conscious Alliance)
- Grahamy Jammy (industry award for support of the scene): Don Strasburg (talent buyer for the Fox Theatre in Boulder, CO)

== Fifth Annual Jammy Awards (2005) ==
The Fifth Annual Jammy awards were held on April 26, 2005 at Madison Square Garden. Phil Lesh, bass player of the Grateful Dead, was the host.

=== Performers ===
Bruce Hornsby ran through his “Valley Road” with Yonder Mountain String Band and Leftover Salmon's Vince Herman. Next up, Huey Lewis joined Umphrey's McGee for a mini-set beginning with “Heart & Soul.” Soon after, Mavis Staples, Sinéad O'Connor and Jeff Coffin joined the collective for covers of “The Weight” and “I’ll Take You There.” Keller Williams and Questlove provided the rhythm section for the evening’s next jam session, which included a Nelly McKay version of Bob Dylan’s “Rain Day Woman.”

Ryan Adams invited Phil Lesh onto the stage for a cover of the Grateful Dead's “Wharf Rat”.Les Claypool, dressed in a pig mask, and Gabby La La joined in during a jam between the Benevento/Russo Duo and Mike Gordon. The Disco Biscuits then performed for the first time without founding drummer Sam Altman, who was currently preparing for a career in medicine. Scheduled to perform “Honytonk” with Travis Tritt (who performed his own show earlier in the evening at BB King Blues Club), the Disco Biscuits also included the country star’s drummer for a version of its “House Dog Party Favor.”

Buddy Guy led a jam anchored by ceremony host Phil Lesh and The Roots drummer ?uestlove. John Mayer, a 2002 Jammy performer and Guy disciple, also made a surprise appearance, adding guitar to a version of “Hoochie Coochie Man”. Medeski, Martin and Wood assisted with songs by Burning Spear and Sinéad O'Connor. This performance marked O'Connor’s first appearance in New York in over five years. Luther Dickinson, ?uestlove, Disco Biscuits' Aron Magner and Jon Gutwillig, Claypool and Marco Benevento all returned to the stage, with Gutwillig sharing a vocal duet with O’Connor. Also in the show, Peter Frampton, together with Guster and Martin Sexton performed "Do You Feel Like We Do".

=== Winners ===
- Lifetime Achievement: Buddy Guy
- Song of the Year: Umphrey's McGee – "In the Kitchen"
- New Groove of the Year: Benevento/Russo Duo
- Tour Of The Year: Phish – Summer 2004
- Download of the Year: The Dead – Bonnaroo, Manchester, TN, 6/12/04
- DVD of the Year: Phish – IT
- Archival Live Album of the Year: Jerry Garcia Band – After Midnight: Kean College, 2/28/80
- Mimi Fishman Memorial Community Service Award: HeadCount
- Studio Album of the Year: Gov't Mule – Déjà Voodoo
- Live Album of the Year: Keller Williams – Stage
- Live Performance of the Year: Phil Lesh & Friends – 12/19/04
- Grahamy Jammy: Ken Hays

== Sixth Annual Jammy Awards (2006) ==
The Sixth Annual Jammy awards were held on April 20, 2006 at Madison Square Garden. The event was co-hosted by Grateful Dead drummers Mickey Hart and Bill Kreutzmann.

=== Performers ===
2004 JamOff winner Jonah Smith opened the ceremony with an hour-long set in the Theatre of Madison Square Garden’s lobby, while the Disco Biscuits autographed copies of the current issue of Relix magazine. The North Mississippi Allstars kicked off The Jammys proper with Umphrey's McGee drummer Kris Myers sitting in for Cody Dickinson. The North Mississippi Allstars also played a version of “Freedom Highway,” with vocal duties supplied by Mavis Staples.

Richie Havens, who was the first performance at Woodstock '69, started the night off with his song "Freedom", backed by the Mutaytor. Next, Blues Traveler paid tribute to the Wetlands club by performing their song "NY Prophesie" with DJ Logic. Bettye LaVette also appeared during Blues Traveler's set, adding vocals on a cover of Steppenwolfs "Magic Carpet Ride". Next Bela Fleck and the Flecktones played a set. Next, a mixture band consisting of Joe Satriani, Steve Kimock, Jane's Addiction drummer Stephen Perkins, horn player Willie Waldman, Jacob Fred Jazz Odyssey bassist Reed Mathis and Grace Potter performed a set. After them, Guster was joined by Peter Frampton and worked on material from Guster's new album Ganging up the Sun. Martin Sexton also joined them for a version of Frampton's "Do You Feel Like We Do." Banjoist Bela Fleck led his band, the Flecktones, on their first performance at a Jammys, welcoming jazz legend McCoy Tyner and tap dancer Savion Glover to join them.

Next, Dweezil Zappa debuted his band Zappa Plays Zappa. Dweezil performed many tunes from his father's catalog and was joined by Mickey Hart, Chick Corea, and Jake Cinninger during their set, then Moe took the stage for their second Jammys appearance, performing with Mad Professor and playing The Clash's "Guns of Brixton," and its own "Buster". Co-hosts Hart and Bill Kreutzmann then performed an improv set which including "Iko Iko", while being joined by Mike Gordon, Kimock, Steven Perkins, Charlie Musselwhite, The Mutaytor, Baaba Maal, Angelique Kidjo and Bettye LaVette. The awards show came to a close with many of the nights performers jamming to Bob Marley's "One Love". People included Little Feat, Hart, Kreutzmann, Stephen Marley, Ky-Mani Marley, Frampton, DJ Logic, Satriani, Hubert Sumlin, Consequence, Musselwhite and Fleck.

=== Winners ===
- Lifetime Achievement: Frank Zappa
- Tour of the Year: Big Summer Classic Tour (The String Cheese Incident, Keller Williams, Michael Franti & Spearhead, Yonder Mountain String Band, Umphrey's McGee, New Monsoon, and Xavier Rudd)
- Live Album of the Year: Widespread Panic – Live at Myrtle Beach
- Studio Album of the Year: Leo Kottke and Mike Gordon – Sixty Six Steps
- Song of the Year: Tea Leaf Green – "Taught to Be Proud"
- Live Performance of the Year: Moe Tsunami Relief Benefit, Roseland Ballroom, NYC, February 20, 2005 (moe. headlined with Trey Anastasio, Sam Bush, Jennifer Hartswick, John Medeski and Ray Paczkowski)
- Archival Album of the Year: Phish – New Year's Eve 1995 - Live at Madison Square Garden
- DVD of the Year: Bob Dylan – No Direction Home
- New Groove: Grace Potter and the Nocturnals
- Global Rhythm World Music Award: Baaba Maal
- The Jammy Industry Award: Larry Bloch
- Green Apple Award: Jack Johnson

== Seventh Annual Jammy Awards (2008) ==
The Seventh Annual Jammy awards were held on May 7, 2008 at Madison Square Garden. The event was co-hosted by Gov't Mule/Allman Brothers Band guitarist Warren Haynes and Grace Potter

=== Performers ===
The four members of Phish stood onstage together for the first time since Coventry to accept the Lifetime Achievement Award at the 7th Jammy Awards. The surprise reunion followed an emotional speech from longtime Phish photographer (and Relix contributor) Danny Clinch, who stressed the importance of family both on and off the stage throughout the Phish community. All four members of Phish addressed the audience from the stage, beginning with Mike Gordon, who said that he was actually sick in bed until shortly before arriving at the venue. Both Page McConnell and Jon Fishman also delivered quick acceptance speeches, before handing over the microphone to Trey Anastasio, who thanked a number of key members in the Phish organization by name and described his former bandmates as his oldest friends. He also talked at length about the strength and importance of the Phish community, before bowing alongside his bandmates and quietly exiting the stage. Anastasio’s appearance marked his first public showing outside upstate New York since entering a drug rehabilitation program in early 2007.

Phish's emotional speech arrived near the end of the night. Co-hosts Warren Haynes and Grace Potter, who have spent the past few weeks on the road together, opened the evening with a band that consisted of Stax keyboardist Booker T. Jones, bassist Will Lee (Fab Faux, Late Show with David Letterman) and drummer Joe Russo, who recently spent time on the road with Potter along with his Duo partner Marco Benevento. The supergroup ran through a number of classic rock covers, including Crosby, Stills, Nash & Youngs "Find the Cost of Freedom", Fleetwood Mac's "Gold Dust Woman" (a staple on Potters tour with Govt Mule) and Al Green's, "Take Me to the River." Former New Groove of the Month Rose Hill Drive took the stage next with special guest Matisyahu and his bandmates Aaron Dugan and Rob Marscher (formerly of 2001 Jammy nominees Addison Groove Project). The strange bedfellows ran through a cover of The Flaming Lips' "In the Morning of the Magicians", before Mountain guitarist Leslie West took the stage with Rose Hill Drive for the evening's loudest offerings. The hard-rock guitarist jammed with Rose Hill Drive and Potter on a version of "I'm Going Down" that included "Close Encounters", before offering his signature song, "Mississippi Queen".

Next up, festival favorite Keller Williams took the stage to perform a solo version of his Jammy nominated song "Cadillac." He was joined onstage by comedian/actor Chevy Chase, who, unbeknownst to most, played drums with Donald Fagen and Walter Becker in one of their bands that preceded Steely Dan.. On this occasion Chase opted to play piano alongside Williams on a rearranged version of "(You Made Me Feel Like) A Natural Woman" and a medley of "Sweet Home Alabama" and "Take the Money and Run" that earned some of the evenings loudest cheers. The pair apparently bonded backstage and when Williams later took top honors in the Song on the Year category, he sent Chase onstage in his place for a humorous speech that included the line, "I want to thank Clive Davis just because I feel like I should." As the show went on Tea Leaf Green made its Jammys debut with guest bassist Steve Adams (ALO) and fiddler Allie Kral (New Groove winner Cornmeal) for a rendition of their 2006 Jammy winning number, "Taught to be Proud." Big Head Todd's Todd Park Mohr and Squeeze's Glenn Tilbrook also sat in with the expanded group on their songs "Pulling Mussels (From The Shell)" and "Tempted," respectively, the latter of which featured some choice guitar work by Haynes himself.

Page McConnell, who was the only member of Phish confirmed to play the Jammys in the weeks leading up to the event, led an all-star jazz combo that included drummer Roy Haynes, saxophonist James Carter, trumpeter and former Anastasio collaborator Nicholas Payton and bassist Christian McBride through two of his three recorded Phish originals: "Magilla" and "Cars Trucks Buses." Then Galactic balanced its jazz/funk past with its hip-hop present, inviting out a slew of guests, including Booker T. Jones, Sharon Jones, Jurassic 5s Chali 2na and MC Doug E. Fresh for songs like "Hip Hug-Her," "Born Under A Bad Sign" and "Think Back," among others.

The evening's surprise guests really started coming out in force when Beatles tribute act the Fab Faux took the stage with stealth performer Joan Osborne for a rendition of "Come Together." The Fab Faux then busted into "While My Guitar Gently Weeps," and Anastasio emerged partway through the song to thunderous applause to take an extended solo, before leading the group into a jam uncharacteristic of the cover act. He remained onstage for the rest of the groups segment, which included a tease "Bungalow Bill" and "Everybody’s Got Something to Hide Except Me and My Monkey."

The rest of the night focused on Phish, both before and after the four members of the group took the stage to accept their award. After the quartet slipped into the wings, Disco Biscuits bassist Marc Brownstein led Disco Biscuits guitarist Jon Gutwillig, String Cheese Incident keyboardist Kyle Hollingsworth, Umphreys McGee guitarist Jake Cinninger and Russo through a series of Phish covers under the name the HeadCount All Stars. Brownstein, who has shied away from covering Phish over the years, described the group as his favorite band and led the charge through spot-on renditions of "Wilson," "Run Like An Antelope," "2001," and "Maze," the latter of which also featured Disco Biscuits keyboardist Aron Magner. Throughout the performance, Moe lighting director, and former Jambands.com News Editor, Jeff Waful manned the board from the rear of the house.

=== Winners ===
- Lifetime Achievement: Phish
- Tour of the Year: The Disco Biscuits / Umphrey's McGee – D.U.M.B
- Live Album of the Year: Umphrey's McGee – Live at the Murat
- Studio Album of the Year: moe. – The Conch
- Song of the Year: Keller Williams – "Cadillac"
- Live Performance of the Year: Gov’t Mule and Guests – Bonnaroo, 6/17/07
- Archival Album of the Year: Grateful Dead – Three from the Vault
- DVD of the Year: Disco Biscuits – Progressions
- Download of the Year: Phish – "Headphones Jam"
- New Groove: Cornmeal
- Mimi Fishman Memorial Community Service Award - Rock the Earth
- The Jammy Industry Award: Lee Crumpton (Homegrown Music Network)
