= Soundstage: Umphrey's McGee – Live =

Live album / video album by Umphrey's McGee
- Released: 2009
- Recorded: Summer 2007, Chicago, Illinois
- Genre: Progressive rock

Umphrey's McGee chronology
Mantis (2009)	Soundstage: Umphrey's McGee – Live (2009)	Death by Stereo (2011)

Soundstage: Umphrey's McGee – Live is the third DVD release by American rock band Umphrey's McGee. It was recorded during the summer of 2007 in Chicago, Illinois for the PBS music series Soundstage. The DVD includes 13 songs from the Soundstage performance and two additional bonus tracks from their 2008 New Year's run at the Auditorium Theatre in Chicago.

== Track listing ==
1. Ocean Billy
2. Higgins
3. Got Your Milk (Right Here)
4. Out of Order
5. Great American
6. The Bottom Half
7. Walletsworth
8. Believe the Lie
9. Eat
10. Words
11. Morning Song
12. Alex's House
13. Glory

=== Bonus tracks ===
1. Made to Measure (with Joshua Redman on saxophone)
2. Wizard Burial Ground

== Personnel ==
- Brendan Bayliss: guitar, vocals
- Jake Cinninger: guitar, vocals
- Joel Cummins: keyboards, vocals
- Ryan Stasik: bass
- Kris Myers: drums, vocals
- Andy Farag: percussion
