= Similar Skin =

Studio album by Umphrey's McGee
- Released: June 10, 2014
- Genre: Progressive rock, hard rock, progressive metal
- Label: Nothing Too Fancy Music
- Producer: Manny Sanchez, Gre Magers

Umphrey's McGee chronology
Death by Stereo (2011)	Similar Skin (2014)	The London Session (2015)

Professional ratings
Aggregate scores
Source	Rating
Metacritic	67/100
Review scores
Source	Rating
American Songwriter	3/5 stars
Blurt	3/5 stars
Cokemachineglow	(favorable)
PopMatters	7/10
Rolling Stone	3/5 stars

Similar Skin is the eighth studio album by American rock band Umphrey's McGee. It was released on June 10, 2014.

Umphrey's McGee recorded Similar Skin at IV Lab Studios in Chicago, Illinois, and it was the first album on the band's label, Nothing Too Fancy Music. AllMusic says of the album's content: "While still entrenched in the wandering spirit of jam band improvisation, the 11 songs lean heavily on the influence of '80s pop, rock, and even radio metal …"

== Track listing ==
No.	Title	Writer(s)	Length
1.	"The Linear"	Brendan Bayliss, Jake Cinninger	3:48
2.	"Cut the Cable"	Bayliss	3:53
3.	"Hourglass"	Bayliss, Joel Cummins	3:23
4.	"No Diablo"	Bayliss	4:13
5.	"Similar Skin"	Bayliss, Cinninger, Cummins, Kris Myers, Ryan Stasik	6:05
6.	"Puppet String"	Bayliss, Cinninger, Cummins, Andy Farag, Myers, Stasik	6:29
7.	"Little Gift"	Cinninger	3:14
8.	"Educated Guess"	Bayliss, Cinninger	5:48
9.	"Loose Ends"	Bayliss	5:01
10.	"Hindsight"	Cinninger	3:24
11.	"Bridgeless"	Bayliss, Cinninger, Cummins, Farag, Myers, Stasik	9:00

Total Running Time: 54:18

=== Bonus tracks ===
No.	Title	Length
12.	"Morning Song"	7:23
13.	"Room to Breathe"	5:52
