= Rockstars and Lawnmowers =

Studio album by Ali Baba's Tahini
- Released: 2005 (US)
- Recorded: 2004
- Genre: Rock
- Label: Monkey Fuzz Records
- Producer: Ali Baba's Tahini

Ali Baba's Tahini chronology
Limbo Boots (2000)	Rockstars and Lawnmowers (2005)	Living Room (2010)

Rockstars and Lawnmowers is the third album from Ali Baba's Tahini, best known as the band Jake Cinninger was in before joining progressive rock band Umphrey's McGee. The album is the first since 1999 to feature the original lineup of Cinninger, Karl Engelmann, and Steve Krojniewski. Engelmann left the band in 1999 and the group split a year later.

During the winter of 2004, Ali Baba's Tahini retreated to the North Carolina mountains to record the album over a one-week period. The recording contains a number of new songs as well as classic Ali Baba's Tahini concert songs that had yet to be recorded. It also features a song from Johnny Scroggs ("Veil"), who performs lead vocals on the track.

The album was mastered by Cinninger and released a year later in 2005. Many of the new songs from the album are currently performed in concert by Umphrey's McGee and Engelmann's band Mother Vinegar.

== Track listing ==
1. Got Your Milk (Right Here)
2. Poster Prose
3. For Your Angels
4. Riding the Road Down Under
5. Lost My Heart
6. Darl's Gang
7. Veil
8. Liquid In My Head
9. Jimbo's Blues
10. Alice
11. Carnival Chronicles
12. Partyin' Peeps

== Personnel ==
Karl Engelmann: vocals, bass, guitar

Jake Cinninger: guitar, vocals, piano

Steve Krojniewski: drums

with

Johnny Scroggs: vocals on "Veil"

Graphic Design: Rob Heimbrock
