= Limbo Boots =

Studio album by Ali Baba's Tahini
- Released: 2000 (U.S.)
- Recorded: 2000
- Genre: Rock
- Label: Monkey Fuzz Records
- Producer: Ali Baba's Tahini

Ali Baba's Tahini chronology
Hopi Champa (1999)	Limbo Boots (2000)	Rockstars and Lawnmowers (2005)

Limbo Boots is the second album from Ali Baba's Tahini, best known as the band Jake Cinninger was in before joining progressive rock band Umphrey's McGee. This is the only album to feature Kahlil Smylie on bass, who replaced founding member Karl Engelmann in 1999.

With the loss of Engelmann, one of the band's main songwriters, Cinninger is mostly responsible for the album's direction, which features early versions of soon-to-be Umphrey's McGee classics like "Ringo" and "Mulche's Odyssey."

Cinninger would disband Ali Baba's Tahini just months after the release of this album to join Umphrey's McGee on a permanent basis.

== Track listing ==
1. Lepidoptera
2. Ringo
3. New Definition
4. Water Movement
5. On Stolen Breath
6. Kat's Tune
7. Mulche's Odyssey
8. Air Movement
9. Packin' Junk
10. Four Winds
11. Fraction Ictus
12. Blueprints

== Personnel ==
- Jake Cinninger: guitar, vocals
- Kahlil Smylie: bass
- Steve Krojniewski: drums
