= The Bottom Half =

Studio album by Umphrey's McGee
- Released: April 3, 2007
- Recorded: 2005–2006 in Chicago, IL
- Genre: Progressive rock
- Length: 51:01
- Label: SCI Fidelity
- Producer: Umphrey's McGee and Kevin Browning

Umphrey's McGee chronology
Safety In Numbers (2006)	The Bottom Half (2007)	Live at the Murat (2007)

Professional ratings
Review scores
Source	Rating
AllMusic	4/5 stars

The Bottom Half is the fifth album from progressive rock group Umphrey's McGee recorded during the band's 2005/2006 sessions of their previous studio effort Safety in Numbers. The first disc contains complete songs that were initially left off the Safety in Numbers album, while the second disc features demos, outtakes, and b-sides from the sessions. Like the previous album, the artwork was done by Storm Thorgerson. The first single from the album is "Bright Lights, Big City," written by Mother Vinegar frontman Karl Engelmann, who is also a member of Ali Baba's Tahini with Umphrey's guitarist Jake Cinninger.

The album was released on April 3, 2007.

== Track listing ==
=== Disc One ===
No.	Title	Length
1.	"The Bottom Half"	5:49
2.	"Bright Lights, Big City"	3:43
3.	"Great American"	3:11
4.	"Higgins Sir"	0:28
5.	"Higgins"	6:51
6.	"Memories of Home"	4:21
7.	"Atmosfarag"	4:38
8.	"Red Room"	3:35
9.	"Intentions Clear"	4:55
10.	"Home"	3:28
11.	"Divisions"	10:02

=== Disc Two ===
1. Words (a capella version)
2. Great American / Believe the Lie
3. Believe the Lie
4. Time Eater
5. Never Cease
6. Rocker
7. Ready Noodles
8. Higgins (instrumental version)
9. The Heart of Rock 'N' Roll
10. Fresh Start
11. The Browning Special
12. Ocean Billy
13. Intentions Clear
14. What Else?
15. Alex's House
16. End of the Road
17. Red Room Disco
18. Rocco
19. WWS
20. The Weight Around
21. Liquid
22. Atmosfarag
23. Words (chorus)
24. Memories of Home
25. Browning Family Creed
26. Biscuits & Gravy
27. Words (Intro)
28. Words (Instrumental)

== Artwork ==
The sleeve's designer Storm Thorgerson said: "This design was originally rejected by Jane's Addiction (the fools!) and was resurrected at short notice by a band called Umphrey's McGee from Chicago, God bless 'em. We had completed the design despite rejection from Jane's, and UM needed something in a hurry and thought this suitable for their humour and album title, The Bottom Half."

== Chart performance ==
Chart	Provider(s)	Peak position	Certification	Sales/ shipments
Billboard Top Heatseekers (U.S.)	Billboard	7	Not certified	N/A
Billboard Top Independent Albums (U.S.)	Billboard	22	Not certified	N/A

== Personnel ==
- Brendan Bayliss - guitar, vocals
- Jake Cinninger - guitar, Moog, synthesizers, vocals
- Joel Cummins - keyboards, vocals
- Ryan Stasik - bass guitar
- Kris Myers - drums, vocals
- Andy Farag - percussion
- Béla Fleck - banjo
- Chris Hoffman - cello
- Joshua Redman - saxophone
