= Wrapped Around Chicago – New Year's Eve at The Riviera =

Live album / Video album by Umphrey's McGee
- Released: 2005
- Recorded: 2004; Riviera Theater; Chicago, Illinois
- Genre: Progressive rock

Umphrey's McGee chronology
Anchor Drops (2004)	Wrapped Around Chicago – New Year's Eve at The Riviera (2005)	Jimmy Stewart - The Album (2005)

Wrapped Around Chicago - New Year's Eve at the Riviera is the second DVD release from progressive rock band Umphrey's McGee. It features excerpts from the group's New Year's Eve 2004 two-night stand at the Riviera Theater in their homebase of Chicago, Illinois. Most of the material comes from the December 31 show, some of which features a horn section on several tracks.

The initial print run was recalled when Jake Cinninger discovered sound issues with the disc, and a second print run was unveiled in late 2005.

The DVD includes extensive bonus features.

== Track listing ==
=== Disc One ===
1. Divisions
2. Great American
3. Sociable Jimmy
4. Prowler
5. Jimmy Stewart
6. Anchor Drops
7. 2nd Self
8. The Crooked One
9. Nopener
10. Robot World
11. Partyin’ Peeps

=== Disc Two ===
1. Ophelia
2. Mail Package
3. Nopener (lounge version)
4. Miss Tinkles Overture
5. Mulche's Odyssey
6. Sledgehammer
7. Women, Wine and Song
8. Slacker
9. Bright Lights, Big City
10. Auld Lang Syne
11. Plunger
12. Push the Pig
13. Ringo
14. In the Kitchen

=== Bonus Features ===
1. Bad is Bad (w/ Huey Lewis)
2. Nemo
3. Padgett’s Profile
4. Wife Soup
5. Kabump

== Personnel ==
- Brendan Bayliss: guitar, vocals
- Jake Cinninger: guitar, vocals
- Joel Cummins: keyboards
- Ryan Stasik: bass
- Kris Myers: drums
- Andy Farag: percussion
