= It's Not Us =

Studio album by Umphrey's McGee
- Released: January 12, 2018
- Genre: Progressive rock, progressive metal, jazz fusion
- Length: 52:56
- Label: Nothing Too Fancy Music
- Producer: Manny Sanchez, Gre Magers

Umphrey's McGee chronology
Zonkey (2016)	It's Not Us (2018)	It's You (2018)

It's Not Us (stylized as it's not us) is the eleventh studio album by progressive rock band Umphrey's McGee. The album was released on January 12, 2018.

== Track listing ==
No.	Title	Writer(s)	Length
1.	"The Silent Type"	Brendan Bayliss	3:30
2.	"Looks"	Jake Cinninger	3:05
3.	"Whistle Kids"	Bayliss	3:36
4.	"Half Delayed"	Bayliss/Cinninger	3:36
5.	"Maybe Someday"	Umphrey's McGee	6:36
6.	"Remind Me"	Bayliss/Cinninger/Andy Farag/Kris Myers/Ryan Stasik	7:37
7.	"You & You Alone"	Bayliss	3:59
8.	"Forks"	Bayliss/Cinninger	4:28
9.	"Speak Up"	Umphrey's McGee	6:05
10.	"Piranhas"	Bayliss/Cinninger/Joel Cummins	4:20
11.	"Dark Brush"	Cinninger	6:04

== Personnel ==
- Brendan Bayliss – guitar, vocals
- Jake Cinninger – guitar, keyboards, vocals
- Joel Cummins – keyboards, vocals
- Ryan Stasik – bass
- Kris Myers – drums, vocals
- Andy Farag – percussion
- Joshua Redman – featured on track 9
