= Jimmy Stewart 2007 =

Live album by Umphrey's McGee
- Released: June 17, 2008 (United States)
- Recorded: 2007
- Genre: Rock
- Label: SCI Fidelity
- Producer: Umphrey's McGee

Umphrey's McGee chronology
Live at the Murat (2007)	Jimmy Stewart 2007 (2008)	Mantis (2009)

Jimmy Stewart 2007 is a double live album by progressive rock band Umphrey's McGee. The album was released on June 17, 2008, and consists of some of the band's best improvisational performances from 2007. "What is Jimmy Stewart?" is a brief explanation of their approach to improvisation. The track "Eat - 2.17.07 - San Francisco, California" would become the basis for a new song "Waist Down", debuted on May 24, 2008. A follow-up to the UMLive.net downloads Jimmy Stewart The Album and Jimmy Stewart The Second Album, JS2007 is the first in the series to be offered in CD form, complete with artwork.

== Origins of the album's name ==
Umphrey's McGee named their particular improvisational creations "Jimmy Stewarts." The name is derived from that of a meeting room at the Renaissance Pittsburgh Hotel. The room was named after the American actor Jimmy Stewart. The band had just played at a wedding for their friend Jeremy Welsh in 2001. The band went back to the meeting room to have a jam session around three o'clock in the morning, and it was recorded by their sound man Kevin Browning. (Pietro C. Truba. (2008, May 15))Bayliss the lead singer said “We had one of the best improv’s we’ve ever had. It was really kind of a different approach to playing that we had never done before and we really liked it.” (Brendan Bayliss, Guitar and vocals) Cinninger said,“So we went down to the concert hall, and barely turned on all the instruments. And kinda sat on the floor really. I think I grabbed my acoustic and we were just barely tapping on things.” “It’s pretty funny, it runs about 30 minutes or so. We get away with literally like tapping on our stuff. It was kinda loosely based there and because of the room, it was called the Jimmy Stewart ballroom or whatever, we decided to christen the name.”(Jake Cinninger Guitarist and vocals). After the jam session in the Jimmy Stewart ballroom, Umphrey's McGee tried to put what they call “Jimmy Stewarts” into every show. "A “Jimmy Stewart" is the specific portion of each show that is set aside for the band's own brand of improvisational music. They also use “Stewarts” as an improvisational exercise for songwriting while on the road. In addition, it serves to seamlessly give fans, as well as the band, something different every night." (brendan bayliss(2008, May 15))

== Signals used by Umphrey's McGee ==
When playing at shows, in order to keep themselves in sync while playing improv they have a number of special signals. According to Cinninger, when the band is playing during a concert someone will throw a signal and within 4 beats show another signal and then four beats later they change the flow of the music. According to Cinninger they usually pick who’s going to do what types of sounds so there’s no confusion with how they're going to play. Simple things like a hand wipe will tell the band what to do based on how they planned. According to band archivist and compiler of the “Jimmy Stewart 2007” album Jon McLennand, there are other signals used during the show. Leaning back, for instance, signals a “bounceback” during which they return to a section they were playing before. This became popular in 2003.

According to Ryan Stasik Umphrey's bass player, there is another signal they like to use where he tries to signal that a section is too long; he stops playing, telling the others it's time to change the style. The most important form of communication Umphrey's McGee uses is eye contact. Cinninger compares the members of his band to sheep and shepherds. Usually the person in front controls what everyone is going to do, so the band members watch the leader and follow his signals. However, true to the nature of improvisation, nothing is set in stone. Everyone in the band is constantly watching each other's eyes but there's not normally more than two people leading. “As long as everyone is making eye contact and looking then we’ll be able to get to where we need to go,” Bayliss adds.

"Typically they use the instrumental interlude of a song as a launching point, and a band member will signal the rest of the band with an unspoken visual cue to signal what to do next. For example, a smile might indicate a major key while a sad face could direct the band to a minor key."

== Track listing ==
The date and location of the performance follows the track listing.

=== Disc 1 ===
1. Mulche's Odyssey - 2.27.07 - Norfolk, Virginia
2. Mulche's Odyssey - 10.20.07 - New York City
3. E.T.I. - 5.05.07 - Dallas, Texas
4. The Crooked One - 4.19.07 - Buffalo, New York
5. Utopian Fir - 7.19.07 - Detroit Lakes, Minnesota
6. The Fuzz - 10.16.07 - Richmond, Virginia
7. The Bottom Half - 3.16.07 - Pontiac, Michigan
8. Utopian Fir - 11.17.07 - Birmingham, Alabama
9. Intentions Clear - 7.19.07 - Detroit Lakes, Minnesota
10. Ringo - 10.16.07 - Richmond, Virginia
11. Nemo - 11.15.07 - Charlotte, North Carolina
12. What is Jimmy Stewart?

=== Disc 2 ===
1. Nemo - 4.03.07 - Iowa City, Iowa
2. The Bottom Half - 5.25.07 - Chillicothe, Illinois
3. JaJunk - 7.19.07 - Detroit Lakes, Minnesota
4. In the Kitchen - 12.01.07 - Ann Arbor, Michigan
5. Bridgeless - 4.14.07 - Washington, D.C.
6. Bridgeless - 4.20.07 - Columbus, Ohio
7. In the Kitchen - 7.28.07 - Hampton Beach, New Hampshire
8. Phil's Farm - 4.14.07 - Washington, D.C.
9. Padgett's Profile - 3.24.07 - Minneapolis, Minnesota
10. The Haunt - 11.09.07 - Bloomington, Indiana
11. Eat - 2.17.07 - San Francisco, California
12. Higgins - 12.29.07 - Chicago, Illinois
13. Intentions Clear - 3.23.07 - Minneapolis, Minnesota

== Personnel ==
- Brendan Bayliss: guitar, vocals
- Jake Cinninger: guitar, vocals
- Joel Cummins: keyboards, vocals
- Ryan Stasik: bass
- Kris Myers: drums, vocals
- Andy Farag: percussion
