= Local Band Does OKlahoma =

Live album by Umphrey's McGee
- Released: 2003 (US)
- Recorded: April 23, 2003 at Train Hopper's in Oklahoma City, Oklahoma
- Genre: Rock
- Label: Umphrey's McGee
- Producer: Umphrey's McGee

Umphrey's McGee chronology
Live from the Lake Coast (2002)	Local Band Does OKlahoma (2003)	Anchor Drops (2004)

Local Band Does OKlahoma is the third live album by progressive rock band Umphrey's McGee. It was recorded just months after the addition of drummer Kris Myers. The album features excerpts of a small concert in Oklahoma City in 2003. Because of the low attendance of the concert, the band did not use a setlist and did very little preparation for the show. The band was so pleased with the results that they decided to release the highlights of the show via a live album initially available only through their website. The album was eventually released in stores months later, but has been out of print since 2005 but was released in December 2009 as part of the CustUm Flash Drive which included the complete Umphrey's McGee discography.

== Track listing ==
1. FDR
2. Der Bluten Kat
3. Pennis
4. 10th Grade
5. Der Bluten Kat (continued)
6. Divisions
7. Glory
8. Divisions (continued)
9. Der Bluten Kat (continued)

== Personnel ==
- Brendan Bayliss: guitar, vocals
- Jake Cinninger: guitar, vocals
- Joel Cummins: keyboards
- Ryan Stasik: bass
- Kris Myers: drums
- Andy Farag: percussion
- Rob Heimbrock: Graphic Design
