= Zonkey (album) =

Studio album by Umphrey's McGee
- Released: November 11, 2016
- Genre: Mashup
- Label: Nothing Too Fancy Music

Umphrey's McGee chronology
The London Session (2015)	Zonkey (2016)	It's Not Us (2018)

Professional ratings
Review scores
Source	Rating
American Songwriter	4/5 stars
Robert Christgau	A−

Zonkey is a studio album by progressive rock band Umphrey's McGee. The album was released on November 11, 2016. It consists of mashups, combining various covers crossing different musical genres.

== Track listing ==
1. "National Loser Anthem" ("The National Anthem" by Radiohead, "Loser" by Beck, "In the Air Tonight" by Phil Collins)
2. "Life During Exodus" ("Exodus" by Bob Marley and the Wailers, "Life During Wartime" by Talking Heads, "25 or 6 to 4" by Chicago, "City Of Tiny Lites" by Frank Zappa)
3. "Can't Rock My Dream Face" ("Rock with You" by Michael Jackson, "Dreams" by Fleetwood Mac, "Can't Feel My Face" by The Weeknd)
4. "Sad Clint Eastwood" ("Sad but True" by Metallica, "Clint Eastwood" by Gorillaz)
5. "Electric Avenue to Hell" ("Highway to Hell" by AC/DC, "Electric Avenue" by Eddy Grant, "The Triple Wide" by Umphrey's McGee)
6. "Ace of Long Nights" ("Ace of Spades" by Motörhead, "It's Gonna Be a Long Night" by Ween)
7. "Sweet Sunglasses" ("Sweet Dreams (Are Made of This)" by Eurythmics, "Sunglasses At Night" by Corey Hart, "Electric Feel" by MGMT)
8. "Strangletage" ("Sabotage" by Beastie Boys, "Stranglehold" by Ted Nugent)
9. "Come As Your Kids" ("Kids" by MGMT, "Come As You Are" by Nirvana, "You Spin Me Round (Like a Record)" by Dead or Alive)
10. "Frankie Zombie" ("Thunder Kiss '65" by White Zombie, "Relax" by Frankie Goes to Hollywood, "Have a Cigar" by Pink Floyd)
11. "Bulls on the Bus" ("Bulls on Parade" by Rage Against the Machine, "Mark on the Bus" by Beastie Boys)
12. "Bittersweet Haj" ("Bitter Sweet Symphony" by The Verve, "Hajimemashite" by Umphrey's McGee)

== Personnel ==
- Brendan Bayliss – guitar, vocals
- Jake Cinninger – guitar, keyboards, vocals
- Joel Cummins – keyboards, vocals
- Ryan Stasik – bass, vocals
- Kris Myers – drums, vocals
- Andy Farag – percussion
- Jennifer Hartswick – guest vocals on track 5
