= One Fat Sucka =

Live album by Umphrey's McGee
- Released: 2000 (US)
- Recorded: 2000
- Genre: Rock
- Label: Street Gold Records
- Producer: Umphrey's McGee

Umphrey's McGee chronology
Songs for Older Women (1999)	One Fat Sucka (2000)	Local Band Does OK (2002)

Professional ratings
Review scores
Source	Rating
Allmusic	3/5 stars

One Fat Sucka is the second live album by progressive rock band Umphrey's McGee. It was recorded at various concerts throughout the summer and fall of 2000. Most of the material contains brand new guitarist Jake Cinninger, who joined the band in September 2000. Two songs recorded before Cinninger joined, "Siddhartha" and "Wild Brumby," feature special guest Dr. Didg on didgeridoo. The album has been out of print since 2002, but was released in December 2009 as part of the CustUm Flash Drive that included the complete Umphrey's McGee discography.

== Track listing ==
1. All Things Ninja
2. Out Of Order
3. Professor Wormbog
4. Wild Brumby
5. Example 1
6. Siddhartha
7. Thin Air
8. Sweetness
9. Phil's Farm

== Personnel ==
- Brendan Bayliss: guitar, vocals
- Jake Cinninger: guitar (except tracks 4 & 6)
- Joel Cummins: keyboards
- Ryan Stasik: bass
- Mike Mirro: drums
- Andy Farag: percussion
