= Local Band Does OK =

Local Band Does O.K.

Studio album by Umphrey's McGee
- Released: June 21, 2002
- Recorded: November 6–16, 2001 at Audioasis, Cincinnati, OH
- Genre: Progressive rock, jam band
- Length: 69:53
- Label: Umphrey's McGee
- Producer: Umphrey's McGee

Umphrey's McGee chronology
One Fat Sucka (2000)	Local Band Does O.K. (2002)	Live from the Lake Coast (2002)

Professional ratings
Review scores
Source	Rating
AllMusic	4/5 stars

Local Band Does OK (stylized as Local Band Does O.K.) is Umphrey's McGee's second studio album, and the first studio album to feature Jake Cinninger and Andy Farag. This album also marks the final studio appearance of original drummer Mike Mirro, who was replaced by Kris Myers prior to the band's next album. The album contains extensive forays into progressive rock and large-scale composition. At the inaugural Bonnaroo Festival in the summer of 2002, the album sold more copies than any other album over the weekend.

This is the earliest available Umphrey's McGee album on CD, as the band's three previous efforts are all out of print except as part of the CustUm Flash Drive released in December 2009.

== Track listing ==
No.	Title	Writer(s)	Length
1.	"Andy's Last Beer"	Brendan Bayliss, Joel Cummins	5:30
2.	"Uncle Wally"	Brendan Bayliss	4:16
3.	"Hurt Bird Bath"	Brendan Bayliss, Jake Cinninger, Mike Mirro	6:01
4.	"Headphones & Snowcones"	Mike Mirro, Ryan Stasik	2:27
5.	"Ringo"	Jake Cinninger, Ryan Stasik	4:20
6.	"Blue Echo"	Jake Cinninger	6:08
7.	"The Empire State"	Joel Cummins, Umphrey's McGee	1:10
8.	"White Man's Moccasins"	Brendan Bayliss, Jake Cinninger, Joel Cummins	6:55
9.	"Prowler"	Brendan Bayliss, Joel Cummins	5:23
10.	"2nd Self"	Brendan Bayliss	4:45
11.	"Roulette"	Brendan Bayliss, Jake Cinninger	4:49
12.	"Dough Bro"	Jake Cinninger, Ryan Stasik	1:52
13.	"Water"	Brendan Bayliss, Jake Cinninger	5:28
14.	"Nothing Too Fancy"	Jake Cinninger	10:47

Notes

1. Michael "Maddog" Mavridoglou on trumpet in "Andy's Last Beer" and "Headphones & Snowcones".
2. Rich Cohen on alto saxophone in "Andy's Last Beer".

== Personnel ==
- Brendan Bayliss - guitar, vocals, rattlesnake tails
- Jake Cinninger - guitar, Moog Taurus II, dobro, drums, talking box, vocals, djembe
- Joel Cummins - electric piano, Fender Rhodes, organ, synthesizer, kalimba, vocals
- Ryan Stasik - bass guitar, jaw harp, rainstick
- Mike Mirro - drums, marimba, vocals
- Andy Farag - congas, bongos, timbales, percussion, groovebox

Graphic Design: Rob Heimbrock
