= Safety in Numbers (Umphrey's McGee album) =

Safety In Numbers

Studio album by Umphrey's McGee
- Released: April 4, 2006
- Recorded: 2005–2006 in Chicago, IL
- Genre: Progressive rock, jam band
- Length: 54:54
- Label: SCI Fidelity
- Producer: Umphrey's McGee and Kevin Browning

Umphrey's McGee chronology
Anchor Drops (2004)	Safety In Numbers (2006)	The Bottom Half (2007)

Professional ratings
Review scores
Source	Rating
AllMusic	3.5/5 stars

Safety In Numbers is Umphrey's McGee's fourth studio album, released on April 4, 2006. Huey Lewis and Joshua Redman both make appearances. The album contains many slower, acoustic songs and a simpler, stripped down approach with little jamming or progressive rock elements. The album title comes from one of the lyrics in the ninth track "Passing". The artwork for the album was done by Storm Thorgerson.

== Track listing ==
1. "Believe the Lie" (Jake Cinninger, Brendan Bayliss, Ryan Stasik, Joel Cummins, Kris Myers, Andy Farag) – 6:56
2. "Rocker" (Bayliss, Cinninger) – 5:29
  - Chris Hoffman on cello
3. "Liquid" (Cinninger) – 3:32
  - Mike Racky on pedal steel guitar
4. "Words" (Cinninger, Cummins, Bayliss) – 7:08
5. "Nemo" (Bayliss) – 4:25
6. "Women Wine and Song" (Cinninger) – 3:53
  - Huey Lewis on vocals and harmonica
7. "Intentions Clear" (Bayliss, Cinninger) – 4:43
  - Joshua Redman on saxophone
8. "End of the Road" (Cinninger) – 3:16
  - Huey Lewis on harmonica
  - Chris Hoffman on cello
9. "Passing" (Bayliss, Cinninger) – 4:15
10. "Ocean Billy" (Bayliss, Cinninger, Cummins, Farag, Myers, Stasik) – 6:37
11. "The Weight Around" (Bayliss) – 3:33

Limited Edition Vinyl Bonus Acoustic Tracks

1. "Memories Of Home" (Cinninger, Cummins) – 4:22
2. "Divisions" (Bayliss) – 9:54

== Chart performance ==
Chart	Provider(s)	Peak position	Certification	Sales/ shipments
Billboard 200 (U.S.)	Billboard	186	Not certified	N/A
Billboard Top Heatseekers (U.S.)	Billboard	11	Not certified	N/A
Billboard Independent Albums (U.S.)	Billboard	16	Not certified	N/A

== Personnel ==
- Brendan Bayliss - guitar, vocals
- Jake Cinninger - guitar, Moog, synthesizers, vocals
- Joel Cummins - keyboards, vocals
- Ryan Stasik - bass guitar
- Kris Myers - drums, vocals
- Andy Farag - percussion

with

- Huey Lewis - guest vocals and harmonica
- Joshua Redman - saxophone
