= Grass (album) =

Studio album by Keller Williams
- Released: March 21, 2006
- Recorded: August 9/August 10, 2005
- Genre: Rock, jam, progressive bluegrass
- Label: KW Enterprises
- Producer: Jeff Covert

Keller Williams chronology
Stage (2004)	Grass (2006)	Dream (2007)

Professional ratings
Review scores
Source	Rating
AllMusic	3.5/5 stars

Grass is the tenth studio album by Keller Williams. It was released in 2006.

== Background ==
Grass is a jam rock record. Keller is accompanied by The Keels, a husband and wife duo named Larry and Jenny Keel. On this album, Larry Keel, Keller's childhood friend, plays lead guitar, Jenny Keel plays bass, and Keller plays rhythm guitar.

The album features covers of songs by Tom Petty, Pink Floyd, the Yonder Mountain String Band and The Grateful Dead.

== Track listing ==
1. Goof Balls
2. Another Brick in the Wall
3. Mary Jane's Last Breakdown
4. Stunt Double
5. New Horizons
6. Loser
7. Crater in the Backyard
8. Dupree's Diamond Blues
9. Local
10. I'm Just Here to Get My Baby Out of Jail

== Personnel ==
- Mark Berger – Package Design, Layout Design
- Jeff Covert – Producer, Engineer, Mixing
- Jenny Keel – Bass, Vocals
- Larry Keel – Guitar, Vocals
- Charlie Pilzer – Mastering
- Keller Williams – Banjo, Vocals, Guitar (12 String), Photography, Help
