= Tea Leaf Green =

American band

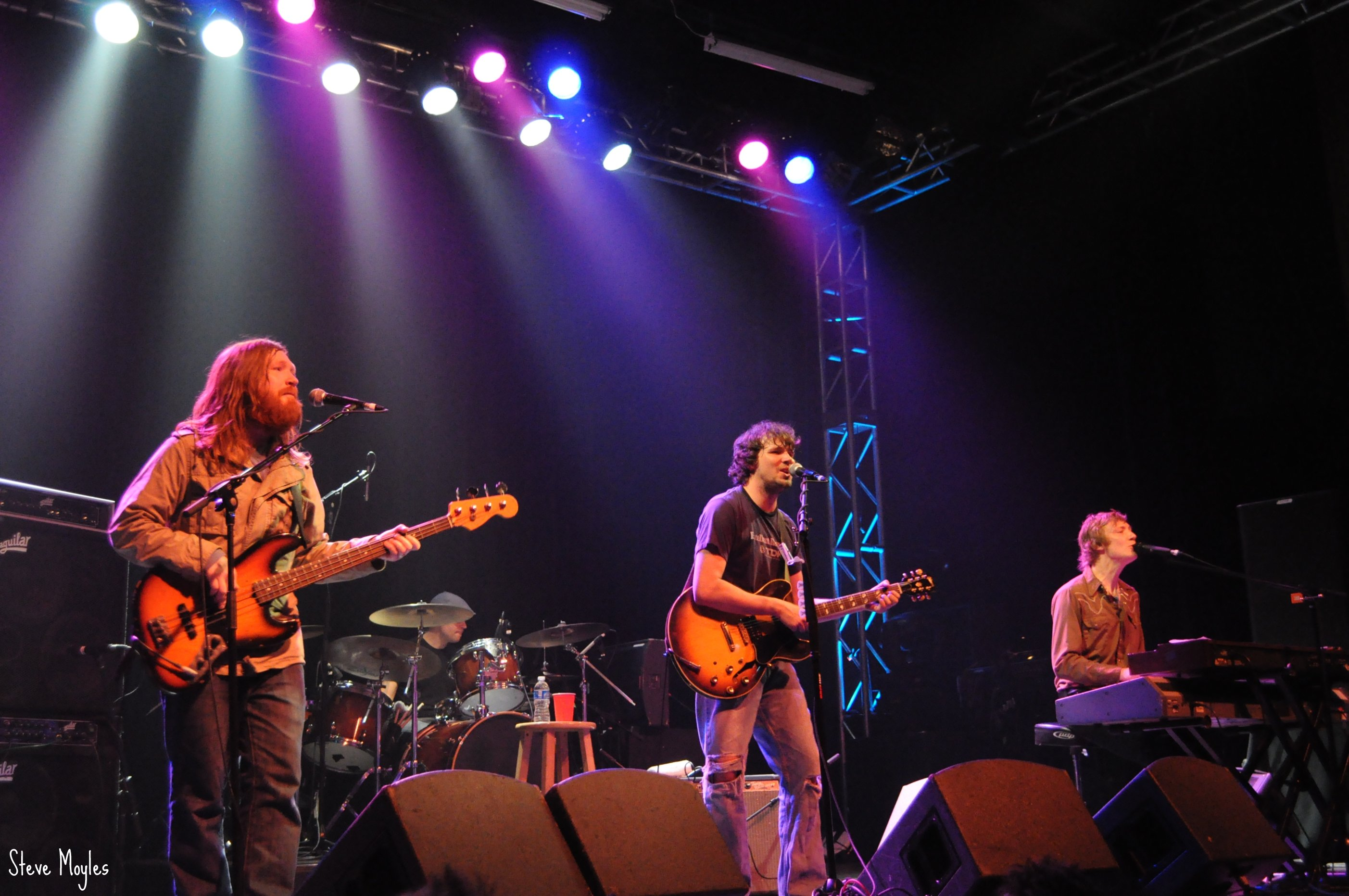
- Tea Leaf Green performing at the Granada Theater; Dallas, Texas, on March 11, 2010

Background information
- Origin: San Francisco, California, United States
- Genres: Rock; jam
- Years active: 1996–present
- Label: Surfdog
- Members: Scott Rager; Josh Clark; Trevor Garrod; Eric DiBerardino
- Past members: Ben Chambers; Reed Mathis; Cochrane McMillan
- Website: www.tealeafgreen.com

Tea Leaf Green is an American four-piece jam band from the San Francisco Bay Area, composed of Josh Clark (guitar and vocals), Trevor Garrod (keyboards, vocals, guitar, and harmonica), Scott Rager (drums), and Eric DiBerardino (bass).

== History ==
=== Formation and beginning ===
Tea Leaf Green was founded in the fall of 1996, when Scott Rager met Ben Chambers on the campus of San Francisco State University. Rager and Chambers began playing together, with Rager on drums and Chambers on bass, practicing in Chambers's bedroom in a back house off Church Street in the Castro District. In early 1997, Josh Clark, a childhood friend of Rager, moved from Los Angeles to San Francisco and became the third member of the band, joining on guitar and vocals. Trevor Garrod, also a SFSU student, joined soon after on keyboards.

In the late-1990s, Tea Leaf Green began performing throughout San Francisco, becoming the de facto house band at the Elbo Room for a period in 1999. The band's first album, eponymously titled, was produced by Jimmy Foot and engineered by Jimmy and Susie Foot. It was released on Bongo Boy Records and featured twelve original compositions, including songs such as "Professor's Blues", "Asphalt Funk", and "California", all of which remained part of the band's live repertoire for years.

In the early part of the 2000s, Tea Leaf Green was an integral member of a burgeoning rock music revitalization in San Francisco that also featured bands such as Animal Liberation Orchestra and New Monsoon.

In 2001, Tea Leaf Green released their second album, Midnight on the Reservoir. Shortly thereafter they followed with a live release from the Great American Music Hall, unofficially referred to as the "Green Album" because of its all-green cover.

=== Festivals and studio albums ===
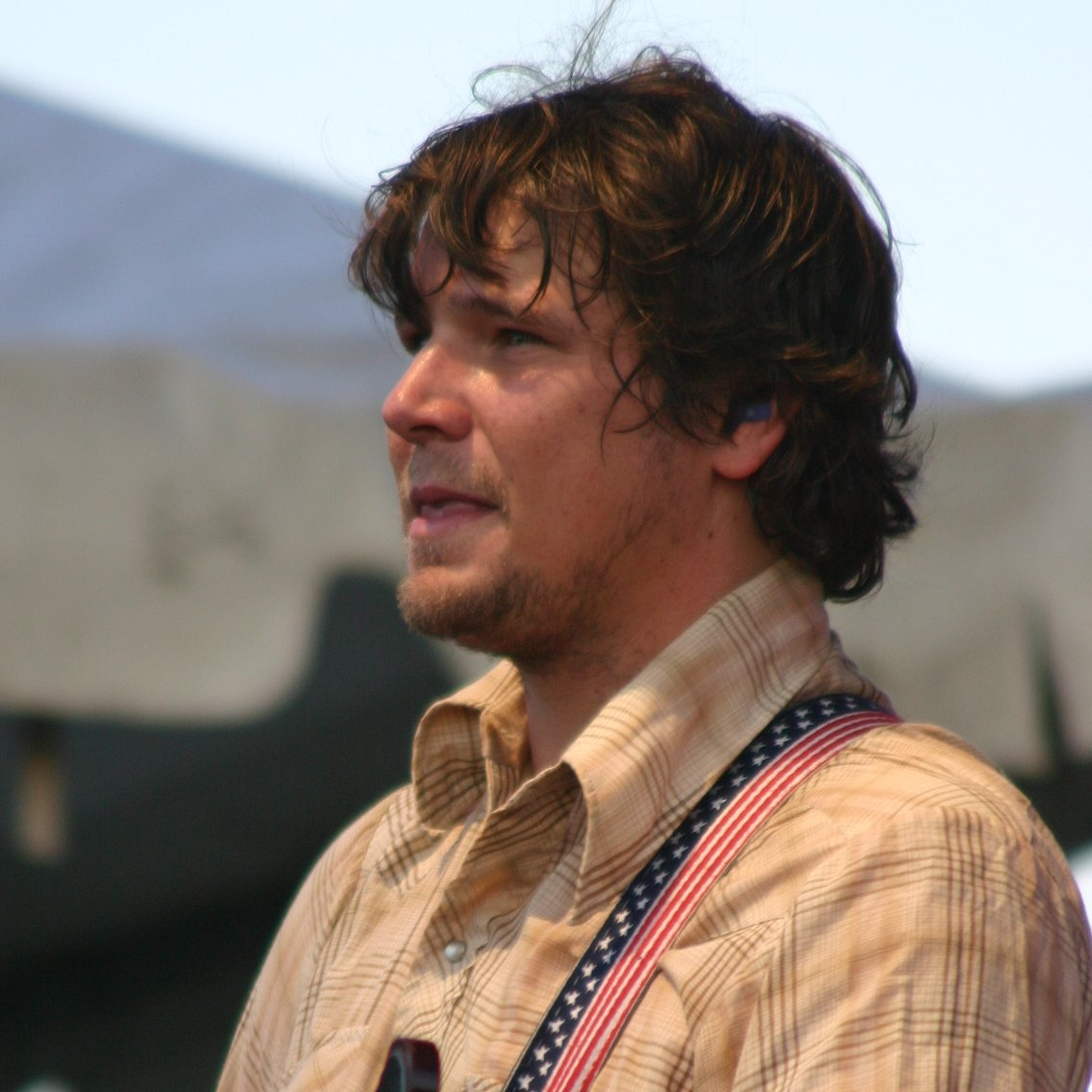
Josh Clark of Tea Leaf Green performing at the Maryland State Fair on September 2, 2007

In 2002, the band embarked on its first national tour, using the High Sierra Music Festival and was featured in the December 2002 issue of Relix magazine. Soon, Tea Leaf Green utilized the festival circuit as a platform of introduction, playing to larger and larger audiences as it built a reputation for galvanizing live performances. Appropriately, the band's third studio album, Living in Between, was bookended by two live releases recorded in San Francisco, Slim's (2003) and Live at the Independent (2004).

While continuing to tour extensively through the United States, Tea Leaf Green headed to Navarro Ridge Range in Mendocino, California, forsaking the confines of the city, to record Taught to Be Proud (2005), the band's fourth album. With a focus on songs, as opposed to jams, the four members simplified the recording process, utilizing live takes on many of the tracks. The title track earned Tea Leaf Green a Jammy Award for Song of the Year in 2006.

In 2007, Tea Leaf Green began the year playing Jam Cruise 5 and toured the country, playing more than 130 shows, including numerous summer festivals such as Wakarusa, Bonnaroo, and High Sierra. Late in the year, original bassist Ben Chambers decided to leave the band and retired from active participation in the music profession. At approximately the same time, the band signed its first significant recording contract with Surfdog Records. The company subsequently released a three-CD box set, entitled Seeds, that conflated the band's first three releases into a single volume. The retrospective was the precursor to the band's first new album with Surfdog.

=== Documentary film ===
In 2006, filmmaker Justin Kreutzmann, son of Grateful Dead drummer Bill Kreutzmann, directed a documentary of the band, entitled Rock 'n' Roll Band, that interlaced live footage from a May 2006 concert at the Fox Theatre in Boulder, Colorado, with individual and group interviews with each member of the band. The film emphasized the struggle facing a young band, capturing footage of the members at home and in the streets of San Francisco as they discuss hardship and sacrifice in the pursuit of a dream. The DVD was released in tandem with a live CD also entitled Rock 'n' Roll Band.

=== Lineup changes ===
In late 2007, less than two months after Chambers's exit, Tea Leaf Green introduced Reed Mathis, of Jacob Fred Jazz Odyssey (JFJO), as its new bass player. Mathis had previously performed with the Jacob Fred Jazz Odyssey, which he helped form in 1994. Mathis played his first show with Tea Leaf Green on December 7, 2007, in Santa Cruz, California. In January 2008, the band spent a week in a Richmond, Virginia recording studio with producer David Lowery to record Raise Up the Tent, which was released in summer 2008. The album opens with a Chambers-inspired funk bass on "Let Us Go", and features two Clark compositions ("Borrowed Time" and "Stick to the Shallows").

Tea Leaf Green performing at the Highline Ballroom, 2008

In 2008, the band played its first show overseas as part of the Jam in the Dam Music Fest in Amsterdam. At the same time, Garrod, Clark, and Rager also pursued side projects around San Francisco. Because of prior obligations to Jacob Fred Jazz Odyssey, Mathis missed a handful of gigs with Tea Leaf Green in 2008. Steve Adams of Animal Liberation Orchestra substituted on bass for those shows in which Mathis was otherwise obliged. Near the end of the year, Mathis announced publicly that he was departing Jacob Fred Jazz Odyssey to commit more time to Tea Leaf Green. The group reprised its role on Jam Cruise in 2009, playing on the seventh edition of the event.

In 2010, the band released the album, Looking West.

In an early 2011 interview with The Waster, Trevor Garrod announced the fifth addition to the band, percussionist Cochrane McMillan, and a spring 2011 release of the studio album, Radio Tragedy. They released another studio album, In The Wake, in 2013.

On August 16, 2016, it was announced that bassist Reed Mathis would be leaving Tea Leaf Green to focus on his other projects. He was replaced by Eric DiBerardino. DiBerardino had previously filled in for Mathis at select performances.

In 2020, the band released an album titled Destination Bound.

== Discography ==
=== Studio albums ===
- Tea Leaf Green (1999)
- Midnight On the Reservoir (2001)
- Living In Between (2003)
- Taught To Be Proud (2005)
- Raise Up the Tent (2008)
- Looking West (2010)
- Radio Tragedy (2011)
- In The Wake (2013)
- Destination Bound (2020)

=== Live albums ===
- 5/3/02 - Great American Music Hall, San Francisco, CA
- 6/6/03 - Slim's, San Francisco, CA
- 8/23/03 - Project THERE, San Francisco, CA (double album)
- 3/6/04 - The Independent, San Francisco CA
- 5/19/06 - Rock 'n' Roll Band, Boulder, CO (released October 2006)
- Live at Twist & Shout (recorded October 2008)
- Comes Alive (released June 2009)

=== DVDs ===
- Green Dream (2004)
- Rock 'n' Roll Band (2006)

=== Compilations ===
- Seeds (3-Disc Set of their first three studio albums)
