= Live at the Murat =

Live album by Umphrey's McGee
- Released: October 16, 2007 (US)
- Recorded: April 2007
- Genre: Progressive rock
- Label: SCI Fidelity
- Producer: Umphrey's McGee

Umphrey's McGee chronology
The Bottom Half (2007)	Live at the Murat (2007)	Jimmy Stewart 2007 (2008)

Professional ratings
Review scores
Source	Rating
AllMusic	3.5/5 stars
Rolling Stone	4/5 stars

Live at the Murat is the fourth live album by American progressive rock band Umphrey's McGee, recorded over Easter Weekend at the Murat Centre's Egyptian Room in Indianapolis, Indiana. The album was released October 16, 2007. The album contains favorites such as "Push the Pig", "The Triple Wide", "In the Kitchen", "Nothing Too Fancy", and "Padgett's Profile".

== Track listing ==
Disc one
No.	Title	Music	Length
1.	"In the Kitchen (Acoustic Structure)"	Brendan Bayliss, Jake Cinninger	4:09
2.	"Acoustic Improvisation"	Umphrey's McGee	5:01
3.	"Electric Improvisation"	Joel Cummins, Ryan Stasik	8:02
4.	"In the Kitchen (Electric Structure)"	Bayliss, Cinninger	2:17
5.	"Higgins"	Bayliss, Cinninger, Cummins	9:17
6.	"The Fuzz"	Bayliss, Cinninger, Cummins	8:56
7.	"Nothing Too Fancy (End)"	Cinninger	5:59
8.	"Ringo"	Cinninger, Stasik	4:42
9.	"Hajimemashite"	Bayliss, Stasik	5:10
10.	"Ringo"	Cinninger, Stasik	5:09
11.	"Eat"	Cinninger	4:31

Disc two
No.	Title	Music	Length
1.	"40's Theme"	Cinninger	8:59
2.	"The Triple Wide"	Cinninger, Cummins, Andy Farag, Stasik	11:51
3.	"Angular Momentum"	Cinninger, Kris Myers	2:55
4.	"Push the Pig"	Bayliss, Cinninger, Cummins, Stasik	10:58
5.	"Out of Order"	Bayliss, Cummins, Mike Mirro, Stasik	8:58
6.	"White Man's Moccasins"	Bayliss, Cinninger, Cummins	12:06
7.	"Padgett's Profile"	Cinninger	12:48

== Chart performance ==
Chart	Provider(s)	Peak position
Billboard Top Heatseekers (U.S.)	Billboard	8
Billboard Top Independent Albums (U.S.)	Billboard	37

== Personnel ==
- Brendan Bayliss: guitar, vocals
- Jake Cinninger: guitar, vocals
- Joel Cummins: keyboards, vocals
- Ryan Stasik: bass
- Kris Myers: drums, vocals
- Andy Farag: percussion
