= Raise Up the Tent =

Studio album by Tea Leaf Green
- Released: 2008
- Genre: Jam, jazz fusion, rock
- Label: Surfdog Records

Tea Leaf Green chronology
Taught to Be Proud (2005)	Raise Up the Tent (2008)	Looking West (2010)

Raise Up the Tent is the fifth studio album by Tea Leaf Green. Released on July 22, 2008 by Surfdog Records, it was produced by Camper Van Beethoven founder and Cracker cofounder, David Lowery.

== Track listing ==
All songs written by Trevor Garrod.

1. "Let Us Go" - 3:31
2. "Don't Curse at the Night" - 4:34
3. "Red Ribbons" - 4:06
4. "I've Got a Truck" - 3:45
5. "Innocence" - 3:58
6. "Not Fit" - 4:35
7. "Borrowed Time" - 3:19
8. "Slept Through Sunday" - 5:30
9. "Standing Still" - 4:38
10. "Stick to the Shallows (Don't Drift Away)" - 3:28
11. "Keeping the Faith" - 3:50

== Personnel ==
- Josh Clark – guitar, vocals
- Reed Mathis – bass, cello, and vocals
- Scott Rager – drums, percussion, and backing vocals
- Trevor Garrod – keyboards, banjo, harmonica, and vocals

Guest musicians

- Dan Lebowitz – pedal Steel on "Stick to the Shallow"
- Aaron Redner – violin on "Innocence"
- Sasha Butterfly Rose – backing vocals on "Innocence" and "Standing Still"
