= Greatest Hits Vol. III (Umphrey's McGee album) =

Studio album by Umphrey's McGee
- Released: May 15, 1998
- Recorded: 1998
- Genre: Rock
- Length: 65:55
- Label: Street Gold Records
- Producer: Umphrey's McGee

Umphrey's McGee chronology
Greatest Hits Vol. III (1998)	Songs for Older Women (1999)

Greatest Hits Vol. III is the debut studio album by Umphrey's McGee, recorded in 1998 and released by the independent label Street Gold Records just eight months after the band's formation.

The album was recorded somewhat haphazardly in an effort to help the band secure local gigs. While the liner notes state that the album was recorded at "Dirty White Couch Studios", it was actually taped in the back of a Johnstone Supply warehouse by Andy Peck and Mike Brinker in South Bend, Indiana. The first pressing consisted of just 400 CDs and included a spelling error of the band's name on the spine. Regardless, the disc sold out by the first week of September. A second pressing of about 1,000 was ordered, and included a reference to new band member Andy Farag in the liner notes (Farag, however, wouldn't make his actual debut until the subsequent release, Songs for Older Women). Greatest Hits Vol. III is thus known for being the only album to feature the original four-man lineup of the band.

Several of the album's songs were conceived and performed by the band Tashi Station, which included guitarist Brendan Bayliss and bassist Ryan Stasik prior to forming Umphrey's.

While GHvIII has been out of print for years, many of its songs are still in the band's live rotation today.

The back of the booklet for Greatest Hits Volume III.

== Track listing ==
No.	Title	Writer(s)	Length
1.	"Divisions"	Brendan Bayliss, Ryan Stasik	11:44
2.	"Kimble"	Joel Cummins, Michael Mirro	6:01
3.	"Bob"	Bayliss, Stasik	8:19
4.	"Phil's Farm"	Cummins, Bayliss	3:33
5.	"FF"	Bayliss	7:01
6.	"All in Time"	Bayliss, Stasik	8:30
7.	"Orféo"	Cummins	5:08
8.	"August"	Bayliss, Stasik, Cummins	15:37

== Credits ==
- Brendan Bayliss: guitar & vocals
- Joel Cummins: piano, organ, & vocals
- Ryan Stasik: bass
- Michael Mirro: percussion
- Andy Farag: percussion (recognized as a contributor in the liner notes of the second pressing, but doesn't actually appear on the disc)

Recorded and mixed by Andy Peck, & Mike Brinker at "Dirty White Couch Studios" in South Bend, Indiana.
