= Etree =

Live music recordings website

etree

- Website type: Live music trading
- Owner: etree community
- Creator: Collective
- Website: www.etree.org
- Commercial: No
- Registration: Optional
- Launched: 1998; 28 years ago
- Current status: Active

etree, or electronic tree, is a music community created in the summer of 1998 for the online trading of live concert recordings. etree pioneered the standards for distributing lossless audio on the Internet and only permits its users to distribute the music of artists that allow the free taping and trading of their music.

== Background ==
etree.org was created because collectors and curators of live music recordings historically faced four related problems:

First, a problem common to all curators: source material degrades over time. In particular, the magnetic audio tape used to make many live audio recordings physically decays and, as it is repeatedly played back, loses its clarity. Preserving musical source material, therefore, meant restricting access to it. As a result, archival music may have been preserved, but it was not being heard by anyone. Similarly, individuals who possessed live concert recordings were typically unable to store them appropriately (in climate controlled, fire-safe storage, for example) and/or they lacked the ability to make copies for archiving and preservation. Essentially, the musical history of 20th century concert performances was being lost, locked up in vaults or decaying in attics and living-room bookcases.

Second, copies of analog recordings tend to degrade when copied due to the introduction of hiss or "noise" inherent to the use of magnetic tape. As a result, no two copies are identical, and each copy, or generation, sounds inferior to the generation preceding it.

Third, given the pre-Internet nature of exchanging live recordings (described below) and the fact that the right to copy many such recordings was or is quasi-legal, the provenance, or "lineage" of many recordings was poorly documented. Even today, historians and collectors find much confusion as to date, venue, setlist, etc., in early bootleg recordings. Curators and collectors searching for source material, or simply the best-sounding copy of a concert recording, were required to spend considerable time accumulating multiple copies of the (supposedly) same material, comparing recordings, following up with sources, etc. The presence of fraudsters, commercial bootleggers, and other criminals in this area did not help.

Finally, as a matter of historical preservation, the existence of a single copy of an historical object (whatever it may be) presents a significantly greater risk that the object will be destroyed, damaged or lost than if multiple copies of the object exist. Archivists, therefore, prefer to distribute copies of historical material as widely as possible, to reduce the risk that all copies are destroyed and the object be lost forever.

== Growth ==
By the late 1990s, mechanisms for capturing or transferring recordings to the digital domain were well-developed. Digital, magnetic formats and media like pulse-code modulation (PCM) and Digital Audio Tape (DAT), or optical media like compact discs (CDs), and other types of digital storage, permitted archivists to record concerts in a manner that reduced or eliminated the degradation of source material when played back or copied. Copies of such recordings could be made that were exact duplicates of the original recording, and such copies do not exhibit degradation in the way that analog audio tape does. Thus, today, digital recordings are typically made to DAT, optical disc, or to hard drives, flash memory, and other types of digital storage.

The emergence of the ability to transform musical recordings to computer data files (such as .wav and .aiff files, which are containers for PCM data) permitted collectors to verify the identity of duplicate copies of a particular digital, or digitized analog, recording. This is typically done by generating a checksum of the data in a file, usually in the MD5 format, and comparing that checksum to a checksum for another file, or a known checksum of the original file. If the checksums match, the files are identical; if not, then the files are different. Such matching copies are referred to as "lossless" copies (to distinguish them from both degradable media like analog tape, and from file formats like .mp3, which remove audio information in order to reduce file size). Such copies are usually bundled with a text file including information about the recording such as date, venue, setlist, recording equipment used, etc., that reduces uncertainty and error in establishing recording provenance and comparing recording sources.

Distribution of lossless audio data became easier as the Internet developed. Historically, distributing copies of live music to collectors and archivists faced a bottleneck, in that collectors had to find each other and arrange to transfer copies of physical media (discs, tapes, etc.) in person or through the U.S. mail. One way of expediting distribution was to create a "tree" of people, the "seeder" of which would make copies of a "master" recording and deliver a low-generation copy to each "branch" of the tree, the members of which would then pass the low-generation master along to each "leaf" on the tree branch, thus speeding distribution greatly while minimizing generational loss (for analog material). Still, this was slow and liable to fail if a single person on the branch of the tree did not follow through.

The idea of transferring DAT-quality audio files via the Internet – i.e., an "e-tree" – was first discussed in 1996, but it was impractical at the time due to the large file sizes required to keep the quality intact. For example, a 74-minute CD holds approximately 640 MB of uncompressed PCM data, and a two-hour concert would require two CDs. Transferring a single CD worth of data over a dial-up modem takes approximately seven days.

Several developments in computer technology made the fourth factor, the lossless file transfer over the Internet, possible. First, the Shorten (SHN) file format was developed by a company called SoftSound. The Shorten process non-destructively removes extraneous data within PCM .wav files, reducing their size by approximately 45–55% while allowing the resulting SHN files to be expanded to their original form without the loss of any audio data. (The newer FLAC format has largely replaced SHN and is now preferred.) These digital audio files, called “filesets”, are thus bit-perfect copies, identical to their original sources, and can be played on virtually any computer, converted to the appropriate format to be burnt to CD for playback on home stereo systems, or converted to other formats for use on portable music players. Second, the explosive growth of the Internet allowed many more people to set up File Transfer Protocol (FTP) servers to distribute SHN copies of their recordings at high speed to users with broadband Internet connections. Third, mailing lists, e-mail, listservs, etc., allowed collectors and curators to locate each other and material of interest more easily.

Once these events happened, the etree community was formed by members of two highly regarded online music-trading communities; Sugarmegs Audio and PCP (People for a Clearer Phish). Starting with 10 people, etree.org saw staggering growth rate. By February 2001, there were almost 300 independent FTP servers providing the trunk of etree.org to over 12,000 users. Tools for creating, packaging, verifying and fixing lossless filesets were developed, and included programs like mkwACT, Shorten, Shntool, and others.

BitTorrent was written with etree in mind and etree was the only bittorrent listing site linked from the official FAQ for quite some time. As BitTorrent gained in popularity, and as the availability of free, high-bandwidth FTP servers was restricted by universities and corporations, the number of etree FTP servers steadily declined, and by 2004, few remained in active service. Still, etree.org continued to grow exponentially. As of June 2010, there were nearly 400,000 registered users of db.etree.org who have contributed more than 480,000 setlists for 42,000 artists, and helped to distribute more than 90,000 lossless recordings for approximately 140 artists, to the world's cultural heritage through bt.etree.org and other like-minded online communities.

== The etree database ==
Started in August 1999, etreedb.org catalogs set lists and sources in circulation.

== Awards ==
In 2000 and 2001, etree.org won a Jambands.com Jammy Award, in the "Best Fan Web Site" category. These are the first two years the Jammy's were held. Jambands.com stopped giving this award after 2002.
