= Stage (Keller Williams album) =

Live album by Keller Williams
- Released: June 29, 2004
- Recorded: March 11–November 15, 2003
- Genre: Rock, Jam
- Label: SCI Fidelity

Keller Williams chronology
Home (2003)	Stage (2004)	Grass (2004)

Professional ratings
Review scores
Source	Rating
Allmusic	3/5 stars

Stage is a live compilation of Keller Williams's 2003 tour and is divided into 2 CDs. Stage Left, features songs from the west coast shows, and Stage Right containing songs from the east coast leg of the tour. The collection includes a wide range of covers including songs by The Grateful Dead, Buffalo Springfield, David Bowie & Queen, Van Morrison, Sugar Hill Gang and Michael Jackson.

The album ranked 39th on Billboard's Independent Albums listing in 2004 and was declared the Live Album of the Year at the 2005 Jammy Awards.

== Track listing ==
1. Tubeular 3:28
2. Rapper's Delight 6:09
3. Skitso Williams 3:16
4. Under Pressure 3:32
5. Shinjuku 3:01
6. Keep It Simple 4:51
7. Dance of the Freek 7:44
8. Blazeabago 2:16
9. Let's Go Dancing 2:28
10. Blazeabago 2:50
11. Moondance 10:35
12. Stargate 5:02
13. Hum Diddly Eye 3:21
14. One Way Johnny 3:28
15. Novelty Song 5:10
16. Shapes of M + M's 3:34
17. Don't Stop 'Til You Get Enough 2:08
18. Dudelywah 4:03
19. Bird Song 9:30
20. For What It's Worth 8:35
21. Prelude to a Cracker 1:37
22. Cracker Ass Cracker 3:25
23. Zilla a Trois 4:44
24. Gate Crashers Suck 3:02
25. Balcony Baby 6:19
26. Celebrate Your Youth 6:40
27. My Sisters and Brothers/Boob Job 12:10

== Credits ==
- Mark Berger - Package Design
- Jeff Covert - Mixing
- C. Taylor Crothers - Photography
- Louis Gosain - Engineer
- Charlie Pilzer - Mastering
- Keller Williams - Mixing
