= Mantis (album) =

Studio album by Umphrey's McGee
- Released: January 20, 2009 (US)
- Recorded: 20-month period Manny Sanchez's I.V. Lab Studios, Steve Albini's Electrical Audio (Chicago, Illinois)
- Genre: Progressive rock
- Length: 54:21
- Label: SCI Fidelity
- Producer: Umphrey's McGee

Umphrey's McGee chronology
Jimmy Stewart 2007 (2007)	Mantis (2009)	Death by Stereo (2011)

Professional ratings
Review scores
Source	Rating
AllMusic	3.5/5 stars

Mantis is the sixth studio album by progressive rock band Umphrey's McGee. The album was released on January 20, 2009. The album became available for pre-order on October 27, 2008.

Along with the pre-order announcement came information that unique bonus content would be available and more content would unlock depending on how many pre-orders were placed. This unusual method of distribution has been hailed as the "perfect way to implement a pre-order campaign".

The band has also continued to offer more bonus content to all purchasers of the album by releasing tracks online through PUSH Entertainment. To access the content the physical CD is used as a key for logging onto the PUSH website. Live songs, some previously unreleased, have been added as well as the album's extended liner notes. The bonus PUSH content has been updated every month since the album's release.

Unlike previous studio releases, Mantis is almost completely composed of material that the band had not played live prior to the album release. Over their 2008 New Year's Eve run "Made To Measure" made its live debut and was played again at the album release show with the addition of "Cemetery Walk." Several tracks feature sections similar to previous live improvisations (known to the band and fans as "Jimmy Stewarts"). Some of the music had been in the works as early as 1994.

== Track listing ==
Mantis
No.	Title	Length
1.	"Made to Measure"	3:12
2.	"Preamble"	0:36
3.	"Mantis"	11:49
4.	"Cemetery Walk"	7:30
5.	"Cemetery Walk II"	2:19
6.	"Turn & Run"	7:25
7.	"Spires"	7:41
8.	"Prophecy Now"	2:47
9.	"Red Tape"	5:43
10.	"1348"	4:49
Total length:		54:04

== Bonus Content ==
=== Level 1 ===
No.	Title	Length
1.	"Kimble (From Greatest Hits Vol. III)"	6:00
2.	"Thin Air (Acoustic Christmas Show 2005)"	5:13
3.	"Great American (Acoustic Christmas Show 2005)"	4:31
4.	"Susanah (Acoustic Christmas Show 2005)"	3:56
5.	"In The Kitchen (Acoustic Christmas Show 2005)"	5:41
6.	"Forks (Jake Cinninger's original 4-track)"	4:10
7.	"Wizard Burial Ground (Jake Cinninger's original demo)"	4:06
8.	"Spires 'Construction' (fly-on-the-wall)"	2:24
Total length:		36:01

=== Level 2 ===
No.	Title	Length
1.	"1st Tri"	3:04
2.	"Doghead Blues (Original 4 track)"	3:16
3.	"Made to Measure (BB Scratch Vocals)"	3:16
4.	"Mantis Vocals & Strings Stem"	1:06
5.	"Mantis Drum Stem"	5:47
6.	"Everyone is On their Own Tonight"	3:43
7.	"Scene of the Crime"	1:54
8.	"TQ Funeral"	4:32
Total length:		25:58

=== Level 3 ===
No.	Title	Length
1.	"Rocker II (Sound Check 12/30/08)"	5:11
2.	"40's Theme (Sound Check 12/30/08)"	7:26
3.	"Made to Measure (Sound Check 12/30/08)"	4:03
4.	"Spires Control Room Montage"	3:04
5.	"Cemetery Walk (4-Track Original Demo)"	6:13
6.	"Eat (4-Track Original Demo)"	3:03
7.	""Boots" Control Room Montage"	1:25
Total length:		30:25

=== Level 4 ===
No.	Title	Length
1.	"Cemetery Walk II (Club Remix)"	2:08
2.	"The Birth of Mantis"	7:56
3.	"Nothing Too Fancy (Acoustic Christmas 12/07/07)"	5:31
4.	"Passing (Acoustic Christmas 12/07/07)"	4:13
5.	"Resolution (Acoustic Christmas 12/07/07)"	10:24
6.	"Hajimemashite (Acoustic Christmas 12/07/07)"	4:35
7.	"Spires 'Work In Progress'"	9:39
Total length:		44:26

=== Level 5 ===
No.	Title	Length
1.	"ogniR (Shank Hall 5/27/04)"	10:10
2.	"Pooh Doggie (Shank Hall 5/27/04)"	4:52
3.	"'Minor' Kimble (Shank Hall 5/27/04)"	4:27
4.	"Laundry Girl"	1:56
5.	"Rip Tip"	4:53
6.	"Mistake Montage (Cemetery Walk Vocal Fucks)"	0:17
7.	"Cemetery Walk Guitars Stem"	2:06
8.	"Cemetery Walk Piano Stem"	2:29
9.	"Turn & Run (Early 4 Track Sketch)"	4:33
Total length:		35:43

=== Level 6 ===
No.	Title	Length
1.	"Made To Measure Control Room Montage"	8:48
2.	"Spires (Pre-Production 4-Track)"	4:50
3.	"Red Tape 'Work In-Progress'"	8:38
4.	"The Crooked One (Acoustic Christmas 12/14/05)"	3:14
5.	"Rainbow Country (Acoustic Christmas 12/14/05)"	2:16
6.	"The Crooked One (Acoustic Christmas 12/14/05)"	4:04
7.	"Search 4 (Original 4-Track Version)"	4:41
Total length:		36:01

=== Level 7 ===
No.	Title	Length
1.	"Mantis Roundtable"	18:32
2.	"Mantis (2 Track Original Demo)"	8:02
3.	"Piano Stuart (Schuba's 12/21/06)"	6:02
4.	"Orfeo (Schuba's 12/21/06)"	5:11
5.	"Turn & Run (Alternate Solo #1)"	2:43
6.	"Turn & Run (Alternate Solo #2)"	2:42
7.	"The Birth Of Cemetery Walk"	9:29
Total length:		52:41

=== Level 8 ===
No.	Title	Length
1.	"Dough Bro (Shank Hall 5/27/04)"	2:46
2.	"Mantis Ghetts"	4:15
3.	"Let 'Em In (Acoustic Christmas 12/06/08)"	4:52
4.	"Great American (with Béla Fleck & Future Man: Pier Six Pavilion 8/14/06)"	9:42
5.	"Sonatina (Acoustic Christmas 12/14/05)"	2:08
6.	"1000 Places To See Before You Die/Cemetery Walk (Schuba's 12/21/06)"	8:20
7.	"Punkle Wally (video)"	4:53
Total length:		36:56

=== Level 9 ===
No.	Title	Length
1.	"1348 (Original Demo)"	3:11
2.	"FOH Jam (video)"	5:43

The entire set from the 1/19 CD release show at the Vic Theatre is also included in level 9.

== Charts ==
Chart	Peak position
US Billboard 200	62
US Top Independent Albums (Billboard)	6
US Top Rock Albums (Billboard )	21

== Personnel ==
- Brendan Bayliss: guitar, vocals
- Jake Cinninger: guitar, keyboards, vocals
- Joel Cummins: keyboards, vocals
- Ryan Stasik: bass
- Kris Myers: drums, vocals
- Andy Farag: percussion

with

- Jeff Coffin: clarinets, saxophones
- Christoper Hoffman and Nathan Swanson: violins, violas, cellos
- Kevin Browning: engineer & producer
- Manny Sanchez: co-producer
- Mark Blanchette: photography & artwork
- David Plain: graphic design
