= Songs for Older Women =

Live album by Umphrey's McGee
- Released: 1999 (US)
- Recorded: November 1998
- Genre: Rock
- Label: Street Gold Records
- Producer: Umphrey's McGee

Umphrey's McGee chronology
Greatest Hits Vol. III (1998)	Songs for Older Women (1999)	One Fat Sucka (2000)

Songs for Older Women is the first live album by progressive rock band Umphrey's McGee, recorded over a two-night stand in Indiana by Andy Peck and Mike Brinker of Dirty White Couch Studio in November 1998 and released in 1999. The album was recorded just months after the addition of percussionist Andy Farag. The album contains many Umphrey's McGee concert classics such as "Der Bluten Kat" and "2x2." The album has been out of print since 2002, but was released by the band online for a brief period in 2005 then released in December 2009 as part of the CustUm Flash Drive that included the complete Umphrey's McGee discography. The cover shot was taken by the band's former drummer Michael Mirro.

== Track listing ==
1. "Hangover"
2. "Der Bluten Kat"
3. "2x2"
4. "Front Porch"
5. "Thin Air"
6. "Much Obliged / Hajimemashite"
7. "Muff II: The Revenge"
8. "The Other Side of Things"

== Personnel ==
- Brendan Bayliss: guitar, vocals
- Joel Cummins: keyboards
- Ryan Stasik: bass
- Mike Mirro: drums
- Andy Farag: percussion
