= Death by Stereo (album) =

Studio album by Umphrey's McGee
- Released: September 13, 2011
- Genre: Progressive rock, electronic rock
- Label: ATO
- Producer: Umphrey's McGee

Umphrey's McGee chronology
| Mantis (2009) | Death by Stereo (2011) | Similar Skin (2014) |

Professional ratings
Review scores
| Source | Rating |
|---|---|
| AllMusic | 3/5 stars |
| Under the Gun Review | 8/10 |

Death by Stereo is the seventh studio album by Umphrey's McGee. The album was released on September 13, 2011.

== Track listing ==
| No. | Title | Writer(s) | Length |
|---|---|---|---|
| 1. | "Miami Virtue" | Brendan Bayliss, Jake Cinninger, Joel Cummins, Andy Farag, Kris Myers | 3:49 |
| 2. | "Domino Theory" | Bayliss | 3:47 |
| 3. | "Search 4" | Cinninger | 6:18 |
| 4. | "Booth Love" | Cinninger | 3:39 |
| 5. | "The Floor" | Bayliss, Cinninger, Cummins, Myers, Ryan Stasik | 5:30 |
| 6. | "Wellwishers" | Bayliss, Cummins | 4:52 |
| 7. | "Dim Sun" | Cinninger | 1:51 |
| 8. | "Deeper" | Cinninger | 3:51 |
| 9. | "Conduit" | Bayliss, Cinninger, Cummins, Farag, Myers, Stasik | 4:11 |
| 10. | "Hajimemashite" | Bayliss, Stasik | 3:46 |

Total runtime: 41:34

=== Bonus tracks ===
| No. | Title | Length |
|---|---|---|
| 11. | "Keefer" | 3:42 |
| 12. | "We Believe" | 3:23 |
| 13. | "Go To Hell" | 5:29 |
