= IV Lab Studios =

Recording studio in Chicago, Illinois

I.V. Lab Studios is a recording facility located in Chicago, Illinois. The studio has been used to record and mix albums by acts ranging from Umphrey's McGee, Sidewalk Chalk and even to the well-known gospel artist Anthony Brown.

== History ==
I.V. Lab Studios was established in 2004 by producer and engineer, Manny Sanchez, who originally started at Chicago Recording Company (CRC). The studio was located on North Sheridan Road in a building that was previously a bank vault. The vault was entrapped by cement walls three feet thick. In July 2013, Sanchez moved the studio from a 3,500 sq.-ft. building to a bigger building that is currently located on North Clybourn.

== Studio ==
I.V Labs has three primary rooms that are open to its staff and clients. Studio A is the biggest room in the building and possesses the 1984 SSL 4056e with G+ Computer (Brown EQ). Studio B is home to the API 1608 console, the first 32 input to be installed in Chicago. Lastly, there is the lounge.

I.V. Lab offers post production and mastering services. An artist/band can choose to have a recording synced with video with their recording session, which continues to grow more popular.

== Staff ==
I.V. Labs has a total of seven staff members.

- Manny Sanchez (CEO, engineer, producer) 2004–present
- Rollin Weary (Partner, recording engineer, producer, songwriter, and technician - nominated for Producer of the Year/2013) 2004–present
- Shane Hendrickson (Partner and engineer) 2008–present
- Chris Harden (Partner, Engineer and producer, musician) 2004–present
- Jay Marino (Arranger, performer and audio engineer) 2007–present
- Mike Sportiello (Sr. Studio Manager and a recording engineer) 2012–present

== Equipment ==
I.V. Lab hosts a plethora of gear and accessories i.e. microphones, instruments along with keyboards, synthesizers, drum kits, both guitars and bass guitars along with other outboard gear including mic preamps, equalizers, dynamics, and effects at their disposal to produce a fine tuned product.

== Selected recordings ==
Album or Song	Artist	Date	Engineer	Notes
Zonkey	Umphrey's McGee	2016	Mike Sportiello	
High Places	Adam Ness	2016	Shane Hendrickson	
Street Lights	Butchered	2016	Mike Sportiello	
Come and Share My Life	J-Livi and the Party	2016	Chris Harden	
Convergence	Tenor Madness	2016	Shane Hendrickson	
My Road	Sweet Mary	2015	Rollin Weary	
Chi-Raq (music for film)		2015	Rollin Weary	Mixed soundtracks for motion picture film
Save Rock and Roll	Fallout Boy	2013	Manny Sanchez	
Microcosm	Automata	2013	Jay Marino	
Cornerstore	Sidewalk Chalk	2012	Shane Hendrickson	
Louie Live	Wynton Marsalis	2010	Rollin Weary	
How They Move	Akasha	2010	Rollin Weary	
Mantis	Umphrey's McGee	2009	Manny Sanchez	
Gunshots On Tuesday	Chicago Farmer	2008	Chris Harden	
The Bottom Half	Umphrey's McGee	2007	Manny Sanchez	
The Chemistry	The Bandages	2005	Jay Marino	
