= Rock 'n' Roll Band =

- Directed by: Justin Kreutzmann
- Starring: Tea Leaf Green
- Music by: Tea Leaf Green
- Distributed by: SCI Fidelity
- Release date: October 31, 2006
- Running time: 97 minutes
- Country: United States

Rock 'n' Roll Band is the second concert film released by rock band Tea Leaf Green. Originally recorded live at the Fox Theatre in Boulder, Colorado, it captures the bands May 19, 2006 performance. It was the first show of their early summer Midwest tour.

Directed by Justin Kreutzmann, son of Grateful Dead drummer Bill Kreutzmann, this part concert DVD, part documentary, fully encapsulates the essence of the band, both on and off the stage. It was officially released on October 31, 2006 along with an audio recording of the show.

== DVD track listing ==
1. "These Two Chairs"
2. "One Reason"
3. "Georgie P"
4. "If It Wasn't for the Money"
5. "The Garden (Part II)"
6. "The Garden (Part III)"
7. "Faced With Love"
8. "Criminal Intent"
9. "Flippin’ the Bird"
10. "Franz Hanzerbeak"
11. "Incandescent Devil"
12. "Jezebel"
13. "All of Your Cigarettes"
14. "Devil's Pay"
15. "Morning Sun"
16. "Truck Stop Sally"
17. "Don’t Let it Down"
18. "Sex in the ‘70s"

== CD track listing ==
1. "These Two Chairs" - 4:01
2. "One Reason" - 5:09
3. "If It Wasn't for the Money" - 4:44
4. "Garden, Pt. 2" - 4:23
5. "Garden, Pt. 3" - 4:40
6. "Faced with Love" - 4:39
7. "Incandescent Devil" - 6:25
8. "Jezebel" - 10:02
9. "Franz Hanzerbeak" - 10:08
10. "Make a Connection" - 4:27
11. "Devil's Pay" - 8:33
12. "Taught to Be Proud" - 7:30
13. "All of Your Cigarettes" (From Sound Check) - 3:27
