= Taught to Be Proud =

Studio album by Tea Leaf Green
- Released: November 15, 2005 (US)
- Genre: Rock
- Label: Reincarnate Music (US)

Tea Leaf Green chronology
Living in Between (2003)	Taught to Be Proud (2005)	Raise Up the Tent (2008)

Professional ratings
Review scores
Source	Rating
AllMusic	3.5/5 stars

Taught to Be Proud is the fourth studio album by Tea Leaf Green, released on November 15, 2005, through Reincarnate Music.

== Track listing ==
1. "The Garden, Pt. 3" – 4:01
2. "Taught to Be Proud" – 5:27
3. "Rapture" – 4:55
4. "If It Wasn't for the Money" – 3:16
5. "I've Been Seeking" – 4:58
6. "John Brown" – 6:19
7. "Pretty Jane" – 3:59
8. "5000 Acres" – 6:06
9. "Morning Sun" – 5:45
10. "Ride Together" – 5:36
11. "Flippin' the Bird" – 3:42
- All songs are credited to Trevor Garrod.

== Personnel ==
Tea Leaf Green:

- Josh Clark – guitar, vocals
- Ben Chambers – bass, vocals
- Scott Rager – drums
- Trevor Garrod – keyboards, vocals

Production:

- Jeff Adams – coordination
- John Ilewelyn Evans – conga, engineer
- Tom Flye – mixing
- Joe Gastwirt – mastering
- Robert Gatley – engineer
- Fred Hayes – cover photo
- Mark Humphreys – engineer
- Mike McGinn – engineer
