= Anchor Drops =

Studio album by Umphrey's McGee
- Released: June 29, 2004
- Recorded: August 11, 2003 – January 2004 in Chicago, IL and Champaign, IL
- Genres: Progressive rock, jam band
- Length: 64:42
- Label: SCI Fidelity

Umphrey's McGee chronology
Local Band Does OKlahoma (2003)	Anchor Drops (2004)	Safety In Numbers (2006)

Professional ratings
Review scores
Source	Rating
AllMusic	3.5/5 stars

Anchor Drops is Umphrey's McGee's third studio album, released on June 29, 2004. It is the first studio album to feature drummer Kris Myers. For this album, the band mixed progressive rock with acoustic folk, jam band grooves, heavy metal and electronica. The album also contains a horn section (including Karl Denson) on the track "Wife Soup."

The cover is an overhead image of the city of Chicago. In the inner sleeve many close up shots of the city of Chicago are portrayed. On the cover, the word "Chicago" is written in maritime flags.

== Track listing ==
1. "Plunger" (Jake Cinninger, Brendan Bayliss) – 5:59
2. "Anchor Drops" (Bayliss) – 4:48
3. "In the Kitchen" (Cinninger, Bayliss) – 3:58
4. "Bullhead City" (Cinninger, Bayliss) – 4:32
  - Elliott Peck on vocals
5. "Miss Tinkle's Overture" (Cinninger) – 5:37
6. "Uncommon" (Mike Nolan, Bayliss) – 2:50
7. "JaJunk pt.I" (Bayliss, Cinninger) – 3:19
8. "13 Days" (Cinninger, Joel Cummins, Bayliss) – 4:28
9. "JaJunk pt.II" (Bayliss, Cinninger) – 3:44
10. "Walletsworth" (Cinninger, Bayliss) – 4:37
11. "Robot World" (Ryan Stasik, Cinninger, Bayliss) – 5:00
12. "Mulche's Odyssey" (Cinninger) – 4:56
13. "Wife Soup" (Bayliss, Cinninger, Stasik, Cummins, Kris Myers) – 7:43
  - Karl Denson on saxophone
  - Andy Geib on trombone
14. "The Pequod" (Cinninger) – 2:55

== Personnel ==
- Brendan Bayliss - guitar, vocals
- Jake Cinninger - guitar, Moog, synthesizers, vocals
- Joel Cummins - keyboards, vocals
- Ryan Stasik - bass guitar
- Kris Myers - drums, vocals
- Andy Farag - percussion

Graphic Design: Rob Heimbrock
