= Ali Baba's Tahini =

US musical ensemble

- Origin: South Bend, Indiana, United States
- Genres: Hard rock
- Years active: 1997–2000, 2004
- Labels: SCIFidelity Records, Monkey Fuzz Records
- Members: Karl Engelmann; Jake Cinninger; Steve Krojniewski; Justin W Powell; Jeff Hinkle
- Past members: Kahlil Smylie (1999-2000)

Ali Baba's Tahini is a South Bend, Indiana quintet that incorporates everything from jazz and fusion to rock and avant garde. The band, which formed in 1997, made a name for themselves on the Midwest club circuit and began sharing gigs with an up-and-coming Umphrey's McGee.

The original group featured bassist/vocalist Karl Engelmann, guitarist/vocalist Jake Cinninger, and drummer Steve Krojniewski. They released their debut album Hopi Champa in 1999. The album has become a sought-after collector's item since going out of print in 2002.

Engelmann left the band in 1999 and was replaced by Kahlil Smylie for the album Limbo Boots. The departure of Engelmann, one of the band's main songwriters and singers, was a drastic change for the band. A few months later, Cinninger disbanded Ali Baba's Tahini to join Umphrey's McGee, where he remains to this day.

Three years later in 2003, a four-man Ali Baba's Tahini (with Smylie on bass and Engelmann on guitar) reunited for a one-off performance in Niles, Michigan.

The following year, the original lineup of the band (Engelmann/Cinninger/Krojniewski) reunited in the North Carolina mountains to record the album Rockstars and Lawnmowers.

Engelmann fronted Asheville-based rock band Mother Vinegar from 2004 to 2007, who, along with Umphrey's McGee, performed a number of Ali Baba's Tahini songs in concert.

The band recorded Rockstars and Lawnmowers with former Mother Vinegar bassist Jeff Hinkle. Ali Baba's Tahini added a new member and songwriter, Justin W. Powell (The Mantras) on keyboards, for their Bottom Feeders release in 2020.

A mini-tour through the midwest followed shortly after the release of Living Room. ABT also did a one-off appearance at Summercamp Music Festival to a crowd of over 4000 in 2011.

Ali Baba's Tahini performed a benefit show for Michael Welter at Vegetable Buddies in South Bend, Indiana on Sept 30, 2017.

Ali Baba's Tahini Personnel
(1997–1999)	Karl Engelmann - bass, vocals; Jake Cinninger - guitar, vocals; Steve Krojniewski - drums, vocals
(1999–2000)	Jake Cinninger - guitar, vocals; Kahlil Smylie - bass; Steve Krojniewski - drums, vocals
(2000–2004)	BAND SPLIT
(2004–present)	Karl Engelmann - guitar, banjo, vocals, bass; Jake Cinninger - guitar, vocals; Steve Krojniewski - drums, vocals; Justin W. Powell - Keys, vocals; Jeff Hinkle - Bass

== Discography ==
- Hopi Champa (1999) (Engelmann/Cinninger/Krojniewski)
- Limbo Boots (2000) (Smylie/Cinninger/Krojniewski)
- Rockstars and Lawnmowers (2005) (Engelmann/Cinninger/Krojniewski)
- Living Room (2010)
- Bottom Feeders (2019)

== Current members ==
- Karl Engelmann: guitar, vocals, bass
- Jake Cinninger: guitar, vocals
- Steve Krojniewski: drums
- Justin W. Powell - Keys, vocals
- Jeff Hinkle - Bass
