= Jake Cinninger =

American musician

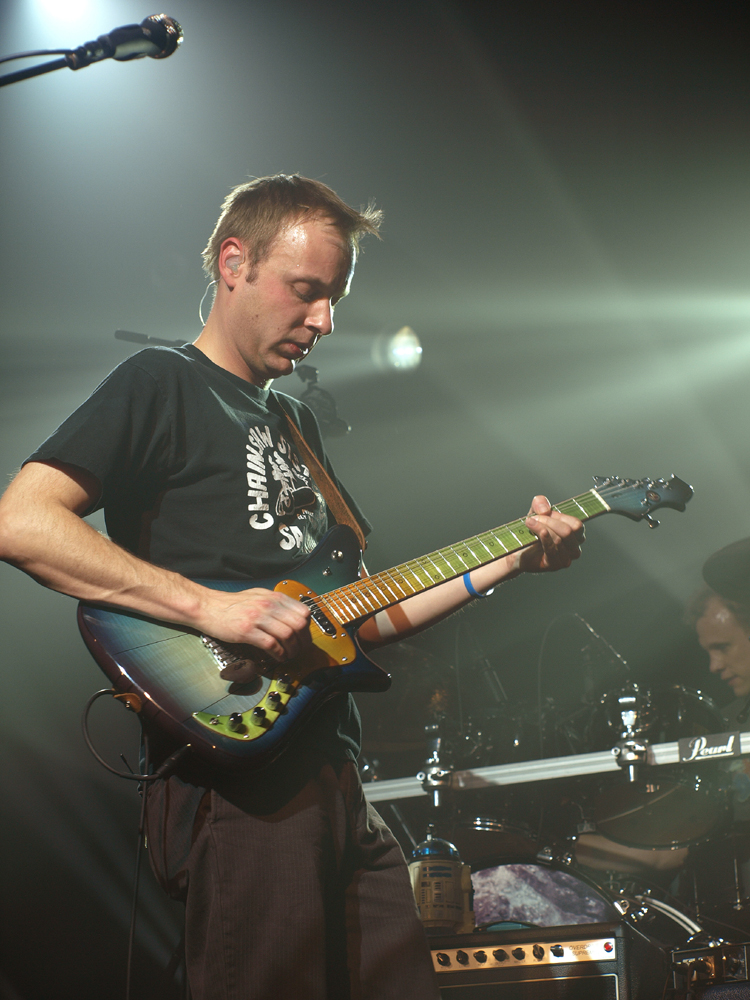
- Cinninger in 2009

Background information
- Born: Jacob Alan Cinninger; December 16, 1975 (age 50); Niles, Michigan, U.S.
- Genres: Progressive rock, Jam rock, country rock, jazz rock
- Occupation: Musician
- Instruments: Guitar, vocals
- Years active: 1997–present
- Labels: Monkey Fuzz, SCI Fidelity, Nothing Too Fancy

Jacob Alan Cinninger (born December 16, 1975) is an American musician. He has risen to fame as one of two lead guitarists in the Chicago-based rock band Umphrey's McGee. He is influenced by a wide range of styles and guitar players such as Joe Pass, Tommy Emmanuel, Chris Poland, Randy Rhoads, George Benson, David Gilmour, Frank Zappa, and Roy Buchanan among others.

== History ==
Cinninger was raised in Niles, Michigan, where he says his parents' extensive record collection influenced his eclectic tastes in music. Cinninger began playing in many bands by the age of 12, ranging in styles from jazz fusion to country music. After spending some time in the Berklee School of Music, he took classical guitar lessons from Gerry Zubko in Roseland, South Bend, Indiana. In 1997, he started his own band, Ali Baba's Tahini and regularly played shows alongside of another local band, Umphrey's McGee. Cinninger chose to learn his chops by playing with others rather than attend a college musical curriculum, as many of his friends did. Eventually, Ali Baba's Tahini disbanded in 2000 and Cinninger accepted an offer to join as a full-time member of Umphrey's McGee in 2000. His first show as a member of the band was on September 1, 2000.

Since joining the band, he has, along with founder Brendan Bayliss, become one of the group's main songwriters.

In 2001, Cinninger released a self-titled solo album released on the Monkey Fuzz Records label. Several of its tracks developed into Umphrey's McGee songs, such as "Blue Echo," "Utopian Sky" which became "Utopian Fir," and "Aster Heights" which contained parts of "Roulette" and "Last Man Swerving."

In 2004, five years after their initial split, Cinninger reformed Ali Baba's Tahini to record an album in the North Carolina mountains.

In 2020, Ali Baba's Tahini released a new record, "Bottom Feeders", which brought the South Bend based band back together for the first record in many years.

July 7, 2026 it was announced through social media that Jake would be exiting the band Umphrey's McGee after 26 years.

== Guitars ==
Cinninger uses a G&L Comanche, G&L S500, G&L ASAT, a G&L S500 deluxe, G&L Legacy, a Fender Stratocaster, a Babicz Identity Series Jumbo Cutaway Acoustic, and various custom Becker guitars. Jake's current touring rig consists mainly of an orange custom shop G&L Legacy, a red G&L commanche (used when power conditioning on stage requires noiseless pickups), and a custom made 7 string guitar. On tour these guitars are run into a custom schroeder amplification head for clean tones, and a custom OldField head for higher gain tones. He also uses an early '80s Marshall JCM 800, endorses Marshall Vintage Modern amps, OldField amps, and also uses Fuchs Audio Technology, and with Umphrey's McGee endorses Moog synthesizers, Morley effects pedals, Source Audio effect pedals and BBE Sound effects.

Jake also incorporates an unusual type of tremolo arm on his G&L guitar. The arm itself is a small piece of metal which is conformed to a specific shape. It is used as a palm rest to actuate the vibrato. This device is called the "Jake Blade" and was custom made.

The "Jake Blade" is now available on the Umphrey's Mcgee website in the merchandise section.

== Solo discography ==
- Jake Cinninger (2001)
- Sky Paper [EP] (2014)
