= Brendan Bayliss =

American musician

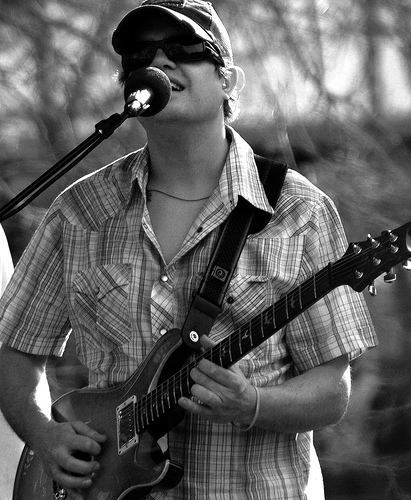
- Bayliss performing with Umphrey's McGee in 2007

Background information
- Born: August 11, 1976 (age 48)
- Origin: South Bend, Indiana, U.S.
- Genres: Progressive rock, jam band
- Occupation: Musician
- Instrument(s): Guitar, vocals
- Years active: 1997–present
- Labels: Monkey Fuzz Records

Brendan Bayliss (born August 11, 1976) is an American musician and the founder, a lead guitarist, and primary vocalist for progressive rock band Umphrey's McGee.

== Biography ==
Bayliss formed Umphrey's McGee in 1997 and took its moniker from the name of a distant relative he met at a wedding named Humphries McGee. "My father's aunt's sister's son's kid," says Bayliss. "He's just a nice guy. Lives on a farm, I think." Bayliss is one of the band's main songwriters.

Bayliss attended St. Joseph's High School (South Bend, Indiana) and went on to attend the University of Notre Dame, where his father Bob Bayliss was the men's tennis coach, and formed the Star Wars inspired Tashi Station with bass player Ryan Stasik and keyboardist Gregg Andrulis. After the band split in the fall of 1997, Bayliss and Stasik joined up with Joel Cummins and Mike Mirro – two former members of another recently defunct local band, Stomper Bob – to form Umphrey's McGee.

Bayliss uses Paul Reed Smith guitars, Mesa/Boogie and Oldfield amps, endorses VOX Classic Plus amps, and along with the rest of Umphrey's McGee endorses Morley pedals and BBE Sound equipment.

Bayliss and fellow musician Jeff Austin formerly of Yonder Mountain String Band played a handful of shows together starting the summer of 2006 and, as of May 11, 2010, had released a studio album together under the name 30db. The album is called One Man Show, and the band went on tour in Spring, 2010, to release their album.
