= Rescuers =

Rescuers can mean:

== Arts and entertainment ==
- Rescuers: Portraits of Moral Courage in the Holocaust, a 1992 book by Gay Block and Malka Drucker
- Rescuers: Stories of Courage: Two Women, a 1997 television film directed by Peter Bogdanovich
- "Rescuers", NCIS: Hawaiʻi season 1, episode 7 (2021)
- "Rescuer" (song), a 2026 song by Alex Warren from his album Wildchild

== General topics ==
- rescuers, people who perform rescues
- rescue services
- rescue squad
- Rescuer (genocide)

== See also ==
- The Rescue (disambiguation)
- The Rescuers (disambiguation)
- Rescue (disambiguation)
