= Rescue (disambiguation) =

Rescue primarily refers to operations that involve the saving of life, or prevention of additional injury.

Rescue may also refer to:

- Rescue services
- Rescue squad

== Places ==
- Rescue, California, USA
- Rescue, Missouri, USA

== Television ==
=== Episodes ===
- "Rescue", Adventures of Superman season 1, episode 9 (1952)
- "Rescue", Ang Dalawang Ikaw episode 59 (2021)
- "Rescue", Beastmaster season 1, episode 21 (2000)
- "Rescue", Chainsaw Man episode 4 (2022)
- "Rescue", Cleopatra 2525 season 1, episode 6 (2000)
- "Rescue", Cleopatra in Space season 1 part 2, episode 13 (2020)
- "Rescue", Combat! season 2, episode 29 (1964)
- "Rescue", Dinosapien episode 11 (2007)
- "Rescue", Freakish season 2, episode 9 (2017)
- "Rescue", Impostora (2017) episode 110 (2017)
- "Rescue", La Femme Nikita season 1, episode 11 (1997)
- "Rescue", Land of the Giants season 1, episode 23 (1969)
- "Rescue", Law & Order: Special Victims Unit season 12, episode 10 (2010)
- "Rescue", Lily's Driftwood Bay season 1, episode 15 (2014)
- "Rescue", Malo Korrigan episode 12 (2002)
- "Rescue", Prima Donnas season 1, episode 77 (2019)
- "Rescue", Return to Jupiter episode 4 (1997)
- "Rescue", Return to Paradise episode 4 (2022)
- "Rescue", Southern Survival episode 3 (2020)
- "Rescue", Super Ma'am episode 37 (2017)
- "Rescue", Supercar series 1, episode 1 (1961)
- "Rescue!", Swiss Family Robinson episode 25 (1975)
- "Rescue", The Bill series 19, episode 44 (2003)
- "Rescue", The Head (1994) season 1, episode 12 (1995)
- "Rescue", The Journey of Allen Strange season 1, episode 11 (1998)
- "Rescue", The Onedin Line series 5, episode 2 (1977)
- "Rescue", Transformers: Armada episode 35 (2003)
- "Rescue", Voyage to the Bottom of the Sea season 4, episode 9 (1967)
- "Rescue", Wonderland season 3, episode 1 (2015)

=== Shows ===
- Rescue (British TV series), a documentary series focused on air-sea rescue work
- Rescue (Philippine TV series), a Philippine public affairs television program

== Music ==
=== Music groups ===
- Rescue (a cappella group), a Christian quartet from Gresham, Oregon

=== Albums ===
- Rescue (Sanjay Mishra album), 2000
- Rescue (Silverstein album), 2011

=== Songs ===
- "Rescue" (Echo & the Bunnymen song), a 1980 single by the band Echo & the Bunnymen
- "Rescue" (KAT-TUN song), a 2009 single by Japanese boy band KAT-TUN
- "Rescue" (Lauren Daigle song), a single from the 2018 album Look Up Child
- "Rescue", a song from the 2000 Sanjay Mishra album Rescue (Sanjay Mishra album)

== Video games ==
- Rescue (1987 video game), a computer game published by Mastertronic in 1987 for the ZX Spectrum
- Rescue (1982 video game), an arcade game
- Rescue: The Embassy Mission, the Nintendo Entertainment System port of Hostages

== Other uses ==
- International Rescue Committee, a global humanitarian relief nongovernmental organization
- Rescue – The British Archaeological Trust, a British charity that campaigns for the protection of archaeology and cultural heritage
- World Life Saving Championships, a biannual life saving sport event, styled Rescue
- Rescue, a 2010 novel by Anita Shreve
- Rescue, the former codename of Pepper Potts in the Iron Man comics
- Rescue, a theme in human psychology
- Rescue, a historical term referring to property seizure caused by an unpaid debt

== See also ==
- Rescuers (disambiguation)
- The Rescue (disambiguation)
- Animal rescue (disambiguation)
