= The Rescuers (disambiguation) =

The Rescuers is a 1977 animated film from Walt Disney Animation Studios.

The Rescuers may also refer to:

- The Rescuers, a 1952 novel by P. B. Abercrombie
- The Rescuers (book), a 1959 book that the 1977 film was partially based on
- The Rescuers Down Under, the 1990 sequel to the 1977 film
- The Rescuers (documentary), a 2011 documentary film directed and produced by Michael W. King
- "The Rescuers", I Didn't Do It season 2, episode 19 (2015)
- "The Rescuers", North Woods Law season 16, episode 10 (2016)

== See also ==
- Rescuers (disambiguation)
- The Rescue (disambiguation)
