= Michael W. King =

American filmmaker

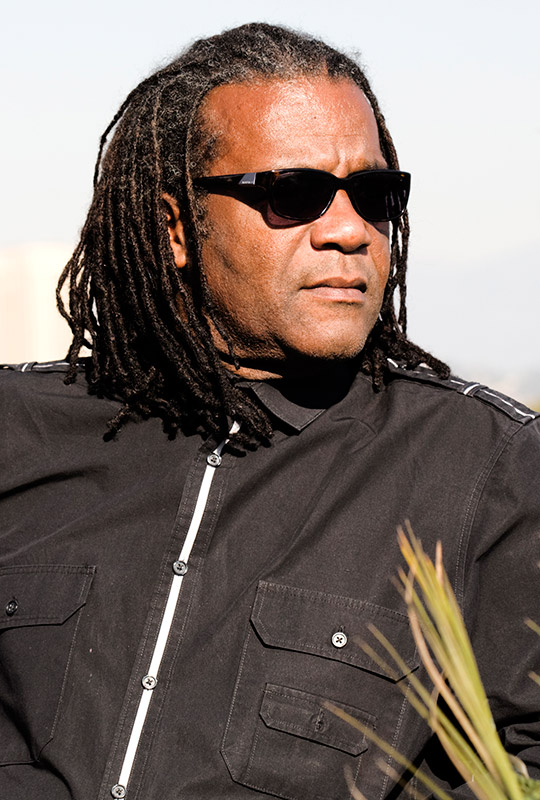
- Education: Connecticut College (BA); University of Amsterdam (MA)
- Occupations: Filmmaker, Producer, Director and Writer
- Years active: 1990–present
- Children: 1

Michael W. King is an Emmy Award-winning American filmmaker, producer, director, and writer of music videos, documentaries, and narrative films. King is the founder of Michael W. King Productions, LLC., and lives with his son, Mathias, in Amsterdam, Netherlands. He is a current member of the Directors Guild of America (DGA) and a former board member of the International Documentary Association (IDA).

== Career ==
In 1991, Michael W. King produced an MTV music video based on Dr. Martin Luther King Jr.'s speech "I Have A Dream". In 1995, King produced, directed, and wrote a PBS documentary titled Making A Living, the African-American Experience, which featured American actor Joe Morton. In 1997, he directed and wrote his first feature film in the Czech Republic, entitled Vanity Kills. In 1999, King created an Emmy award-winning PBS documentary entitled Bangin’, featuring Chuck D from Public Enemy, which explored youth violence in America.

In 2007, he completed a feature documentary called Rapping with Shakespeare (2008), which followed the story of an English teacher who used hip hop and rap to help his students better access Shakespeare's works, while making parallels between the lives of five South Central Los Angeles teenagers and Shakespeare's characters.

Michael King also executive produced Crenshaw Nights, starring Vondie Curtis-Hall and Judd Nelson in 2008 for the American Film Institute.

In 2010 King produced, directed, and wrote a documentary called The Rescuers, which tells the story of 13 heroic World War II diplomats who helped save the lives of tens of thousands of Jews during the Holocaust. The Rescuers stars historian and Holocaust expert Sir Martin Gilbert and Rwandan anti-genocide activist Stephanie Nyombayire, and features Charles, Prince of Wales.

== The Rescuers - 10th Anniversary screening ==
On Thursday, September 22, 2022, a remastered version of ‘The Rescuers’ was shown for one night only at The Mandell JCC to commemorate the 10th anniversary of the film's release. The panel for the post-film discussion featured Debórah Dwork, Ph.D., Director, Center for the Study of the Holocaust, Genocide, and Crimes Against Humanity The Graduate Center – City University of New York; Dr. Stephanie Fagin-Jones, clinical psychologist, Adjunct Associate Professor of Psychology at Columbia University Teachers College, and a Holocaust heroism science scholar; Joel N. Lohr, Ph.D., President of Hartford International University for Religion and Peace; and Dr. Sylvia Smoller, Scientist, writer and Holocaust Survivor. The panel was moderated by Avinoam J. Patt, Ph.D., The Doris and Simon Konover Chair of Judaic Studies and Director of the Center for Judaic Studies and Contemporary Jewish Life at the University of Connecticut.

== The Last Chance Project ==
Michael W. King was approached in 2021 by the USC Shoah Foundation for the survivor testimonies from ‘The Rescuers’ for their Visual History Archive. In building the testimonies for the Andrew J. and Joyce D. Mandell International Rescuers Collection, King decided to expand his research efforts to identify additional survivors and relatives to document the stories of additional diplomats with Righteous Among the Nations status. With that developed “The Rescuers Last Chance Project,” a ‘race against time’ to identify the people who knew the remaining diplomats and Holocaust survivors who benefited from their assistance, in telling those stories."The Rescuers". IMDb.

Michael King directing Budapest 2024 Behind the scene Rescuers Last Chance Project

== Filmography ==
| Year | Production | Role |
|---|---|---|
| 1990 | Arts and Entertainment Revue TV Series | Producer |
| 1995 | Making a Living: the African-American Experience | Director, Producer and Writer |
| 1997 | Vanity Kills | Writer and Director |
| 1999 | Bangin | Writer, Producer and Director |
| 2002 | Breaking the Silence, Sex is Not a Four Letter Word | Director |
| 2007 | Rapping With Shakespeare | Director and Producer |
| 2008 | Crenshaw Nights | Executive Producer |
| 2010 | The Rescuers | Director, Producer and Writer |

== Awards and nominations ==
| Year | Award | Organization | Work | Category | Result |
|---|---|---|---|---|---|
| 1999 | Best Documentary | Emmy | Bangin' | PBS documentary feature | Won |
| 1999 | Best Documentary and Best Editing | International Television and Video Association | Bangin' | PBS documentary feature | Won |
| 2008 | A&E Indie Filmmaker Award | A&E IndieFilms | Rapping with Shakespeare | Documentary | Nominated |
| 2002 | Carl Lutz Medal of Freedom | Switzerland | The Rescuers | Documentary Feature | Awarded |
| 2010 | Harriet Buescher Lawrence ’34 Prize | Connecticut College | Lifetime achievement | outstanding contributions to society | Awarded |
| 2012 | Outstanding Documentary | The NAACP Image Awards | The Rescuers | Documentary | Nominated |
| 2024 | Lifetime Achievement | Certificate of Special Congressional Recognition U.S. Congress (Congressional Award) | Rescuers - Last Chance Project | Documentary | Awarded |

== Screening on Capitol Hill ==
On Monday, May 6, 2024, the remastered version of ‘The Rescuers’ was shown before Senators and members of Congress, commemorating Holocaust Remembrance Day Yom HaShoah and in support of The Forgotten Heroes of the Holocaust Congressional Gold Medal Act. The panel for a pre-film discussion featured Dr. Edmund Duckwitz, the Ambassador (ret.) of the Federal Republic of Germany; Birgitta Tazelaar, the Ambassador of the Kingdom of the Netherlands in the U.S.; and Ellen Germain, the U.S. State Department Special Envoy for Holocaust Issues. Peter Alexander, NBC Chief White House Correspondent, moderated the panel. Before the screening of the film, Director/Producer Michael W. King was presented with a Certificate of Special Congressional Recognition by Congressman John B. Larson for his accomplished 35 years of commitment and service to humanitarian and artistic endeavors."WUSA". Vimeo. "KNTV". Vimeo. "WTTG". Vimeo.
