= Chateau Benares =

Studio album by Sanjay Mishra
- Released: 2006
- Label: Akar Music, City Hall Records

Sanjay Mishra chronology
Rescue (2000)	Chateau Benares (2006)	Lamplighter (2014)

Chateau Benares is an album by Sanjay Mishra, released in 2006.

== Critical reception ==
In The Washington Post, Mike Joyce wrote, "Thanks in no small part to Blue Incantation, a highly regarded collaboration with fellow guitarist Jerry Garcia released in 1995, Sanjay Mishra has developed a reputation for creating imaginative, cross-cultural soundscapes. Chateau Benares, in which East again coalesces with West in ways that sometimes border on the hypnotic, follows suit.... Whatever the album's commercial fate, Mishra's artistry and vision certainly deserve the exposure."

== Track listing ==
All music composed and arranged by Sanjay Mishra, except "Oriental", composed by Enrique Granados (arranged by Mishra for classical and fretless guitar)

1. "A Different Morning" – 4:58
2. "Loop 4" – 6:36
3. "The Gateless Gate" – 6:24
4. "Logical Journey" – 4:45
5. "The Lady with the Flowers" – 1:39
6. "Since Then" – 2:18
7. "Oriental" – 5:01
8. "The Bells of Heaven Ring" – 6:23
9. "Raindrum" – 3:32
10. "Mirror" – 3:54
11. "Loop 4 Alternate" – 5:39
12. "Oslo" – 2:15

== Personnel ==
Musicians

- Sanjay Mishra – MIDI nylon string electric guitar
- DJ Logic – turntables
- Keller Williams – guitar, electric bass
- Steve Gorn – bamboo flute
- Barun Pal – slide guitar
- Samir Chatterjee – tabla
- Miti – additional programming: mix, guitar, and bass

Production

- Sanjay Mishra – producer, mixing, mastering
- Brad Taishoff – executive producer
