= The Rescuers (2011 film) =

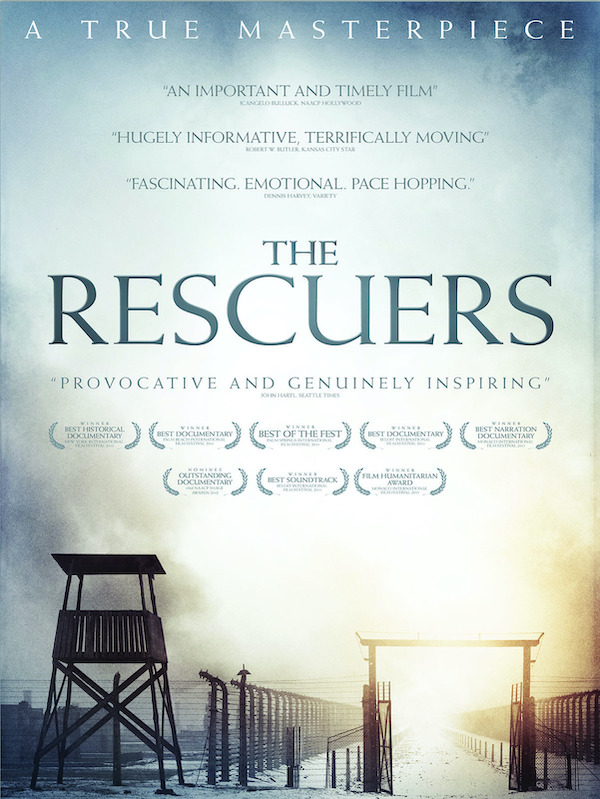
- Directed by: Michael W. King
- Written by: Anthony Edward Valletta and Michael W. King
- Produced by: Joyce D Mandell and Michael W. King
- Cinematography: Anka Malatynska
- Edited by: George Artope
- Music by: Paul M. van Brugge
- Production company: Michael W. King Productions
- Release date: January 5, 2011
- Running time: 94 minutes
- Country: United States
- Languages: English, Polish, German, Danish

The Rescuers is a 2011 documentary film directed and produced by Michael W. King.

== Synopsis ==
The Rescuers, a documentary produced by Joyce D. Mandell and directed by Michael W. King, sheds light on the untold stories of 12 courageous diplomats who, at considerable personal risk, saved tens of thousands of Jews during World War II. The film follows Stephanie Nyombayire, a young activist from Rwanda who lost 100 family members in the Rwandan genocide, and Sir Martin Gilbert, a prominent historian specializing in the 20th century and the Holocaust, as they travel through 15 countries and three continents to interview survivors and descendants of the diplomats. Nyombayire and Gilbert explore the concepts of "the enigma of kindness" and "ethical bravery amid peril" while considering past atrocities, aiming to understand what actions should be taken to halt ongoing genocides such as the one in Darfur.

During World War II, many non-Jewish diplomats defied their governments, sacrificing their careers, families, and livelihoods to save people they had no personal connection with. Their actions compel us to contemplate the enigma of altruism. What motivates an individual to do what is right, regardless of potential repercussions? What drives someone to act with integrity and kindness, disregarding recognition or compensation, solely because their inner values urge them to, at any cost and through any means necessary?

The film incorporates archival footage and combines documentary elements with dramatic re-enactments, transporting audiences from Sir Martin's library in London to the streets of the Champs-Élysées in Paris and then to the Sacred Valley of Destroyed Communities at Yad Vashem in Jerusalem. Survivors and descendants of the diplomats continue to be interviewed in Germany, Denmark, France, Poland, Lithuania, and ultimately Budapest, where the largest diplomatic rescue operation in history took place.

Throughout the documentary, Nyombayire confronts challenging realities. She interviews Lieutenant General Romeo Dallaire, the former Force Commander of the United Nations Peacekeeping Force in Rwanda. Dallaire expresses the U.N.'s stance, stating, "When the genocide began, my mandate as a U.N. Peacekeeper was over. There was reluctance to engage in another operation in Africa, following the recent debacle in Somalia. The U.N. was hesitant about getting involved in another complex African issue and was trying to contain costs. The hope was that the situation would resolve itself. Consequently, it meant that Rwanda and Black Africa were not a priority.”

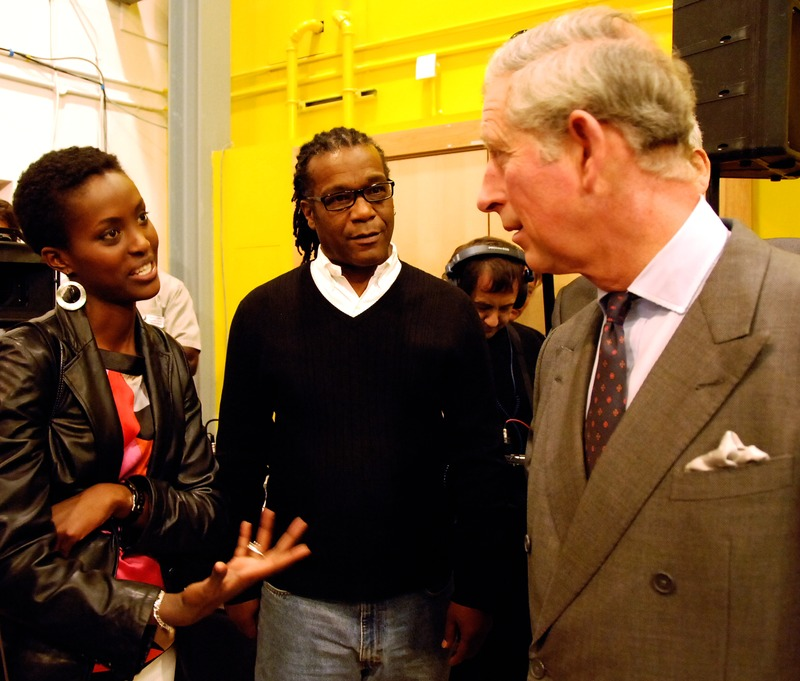
Michael W. King-Stephanie Nyombayire-Prince Charles-Behind the scene of The Rescuers

The film depicts a range of individuals involved in aiding victims during the 1944 genocide, including diplomats such as German Georg F. Duckwitz in Copenhagen, Americans Varian Fry and Hiram Bingham in Marseilles, Japanese Consul Chiune Sugihara and the Dutch Jan Zwartendijk in Kaunas, Turkish Consul Selahattin Ulkumen in Rhodes, British Captain Frank Foley in Berlin, Polish diplomat Henryk Slawik in Budapest, and Swedish diplomat Raoul Wallenberg, who collaborated with Archbishop Angelo Rotta of the Vatican to coordinate Rescue efforts. Notably, the film also features the involvement of Consul Carl Lutz of Switzerland and others. His Royal Highness Prince Charles, The Prince of Wales, also shares a lesser-known story about his family.

== Development ==
Background

Upon receiving a call from producer Joyce D. Mandell, director Michael King initiated The Rescuers project, drawing inspiration from the heroic actions of the diplomats. Mandell, a distinguished businesswoman and philanthropist, first encountered the story while providing support for a photography exhibit on diplomats at the University of Hartford. Subsequently, she encountered the exhibit at the Legislative building in Washington, D.C., and on Ellis Island. Recognizing the compelling nature of the story, Mandell proposed the creation of a documentary to bring this lesser-known narrative to a wider audience, leading to her collaboration with King.

"To actualize Joyce's vision, I was invited to Connecticut to meet 'the committee', a group that would serve as semi-advisors for the project," King said. The committee comprised a Judaic Studies professor, a Rabbi, an executive director of a Jewish Community Center, a film curator from a museum, an author specializing in Jewish history, various historians, and other individuals knowledgeable about the subject matter. At this meeting, I articulated my reasons for pursuing a film about the Holocaust as an African American. I emphasized that all of my films seek to address social issues. As an African American, I bring a profound understanding of atrocities committed against humanity. I drew parallels to Steven Spielberg's ability to create the film "The Color Purple," highlighting the potential for diverse perspectives on sensitive topics. The concept for this film aims to present a new viewpoint on the Holocaust, portraying it through the lens of a young girl from Rwanda in today's world, seeking to bridge the gap between the past and present and create a story with universal relevance.

King's paramount objective was not only to document the diplomats' narrative but also to ensure that the film resonated with a broader, younger audience while exploring the enduring relevance of the Holocaust and the diplomats' actions in contemporary society. In pursuit of this goal, he encountered Stephanie Nyombayire, a young Rwandan anti-genocide activist and co-founder of the Genocide Action Network, who had experienced personal loss during the Rwandan genocide. Nyombayire swiftly expressed her keen interest in a project that sheds light on the courageous actions of those who stood up for their beliefs and underscores the potential of this story to inspire bystanders to combat genocide.

When searching for a narrator and companion for Nyombayire in the film, King met Sir Martin Gilbert, a distinguished Holocaust historian who had endured the loss of several family members during that period. King traveled to London to meet Sir Martin and coincidentally discovered that the historian had recently completed his book, "The Righteous: The Unsung Heroes of the Holocaust," which focused on ordinary individuals who rescued Jews during the Holocaust. Sir Martin was also in the process of writing a book about the "Righteous Diplomats" who saved Jews. Sir Martin's participation in The Rescuers facilitated crucial access to significant contacts across Europe, thus proving instrumental to the film's development. Sir Martin expressed that although he had written about these diplomats, he had never met them. He expressed appreciation for the film, as it provided him with a precious opportunity to do so. Nyombayire observed that Sir Martin is a very private individual, but noted that the 60 years since he lost many of his family members have brought him closer to the experience. She admired his strength and dedication to retracing the steps, history, and rationale that led to the justification of the killing of his family and those who could have been his friends. Nyombayire highlighted that she learned about how history impacts our growth from Sir Martin. She stated, "I realized that we have the responsibility to record its path so that it can be comprehended and not repeated.”

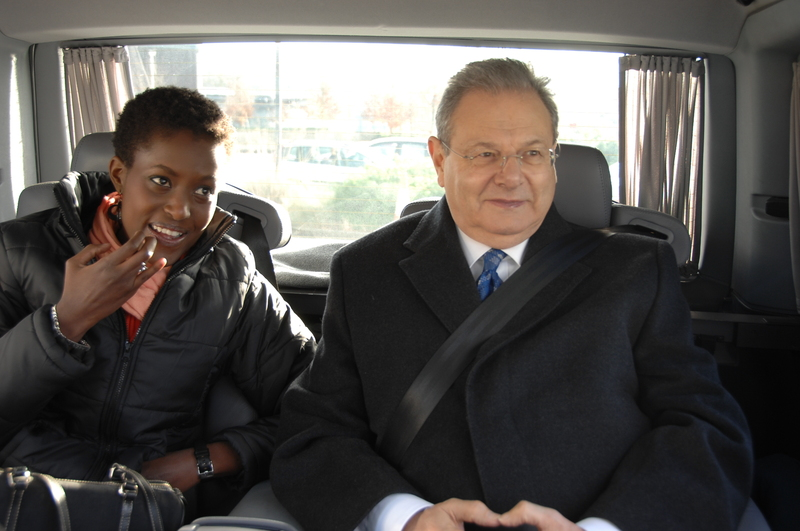
Stephanie Nyombayire with Sir Martin Gilbert

Accompanied by Sir Martin, King journeyed to Jerusalem and commenced extensive research at Yad Vashem, the official memorial to the Jewish victims of the Holocaust, in Israel. During this time, he gained access to the files of the Righteous Diplomats, housing testimonies of those who were rescued and safeguarded. With the guidance of Irena Steinfeldt, the director of the Righteous Department, King successfully obtained the names of the diplomats’ descendants and Holocaust survivors, enabling him to subsequently arrange meetings and conduct interviews with them. Following this, King refined the treatment, cast selection, and storytelling approach. He emphasized dedicating three months to rigorous research and immersive study of the subject to achieve a comprehensive understanding.

Irene Steinfeldt highlighted that the diplomats form a distinct and limited segment within the Righteous group. Their notable characteristics lie in their tendency to defy their superiors, disregard rules, and act contrary to expectations. While such behavior would typically not be endorsed, in this particular context, it sets them apart.

King, from the outset, was transparent with all potential subjects in the movie. "I disclosed my African American heritage and Nyombayire to everyone. I ensured that all were aware of my African American background and Nyombayire. Sir Martin's esteemed reputation and qualifications undeniably enhanced our credibility," King asserts. "I elucidated the film's concept, exploring the mystery of goodness and the underlying motivations that lead one person to act rightly while another does not. Nevertheless, I still had to gain their trust to accurately portray their story, especially since I was delving into a history unfamiliar to me." Gaining their trust to the extent that they felt comfortable sharing their story and revisiting the past was a significant accomplishment. I am deeply honored to have achieved this.

In The Rescuers, King expresses the belief that impactful narratives possess the ability to inspire personal development and a quest for improvement. He underscores the appeal of participating in this endeavor and the significance of sharing one's story to influence the future.

Within the context of The Rescuers, 12 diplomats are spotlighted, a selection informed by three primary criteria: the efficacy in saving lives, the emotional and dramatic elements of each account, and the intention to challenge stereotypes. Of note are two diplomats, including Georg Ferdinand Duckwitz, who were specifically selected to dismantle prevailing stereotypes. Duckwitz, a member of the Nazi Party and the German Attaché in Copenhagen defied expectations by facilitating the transport of Danish Jews to safety in Sweden, ultimately safeguarding 7,200 individuals. This exemplifies a remarkable demonstration of compassion from a member of the Nazi Party, a cohort historically associated with nefarious pursuits. A second notable figure is Selahattin Ulkumen, a Muslim diplomat serving as the official Turkish Consul on the Greek Island of Rhodes, who has been credited with protecting generations of Jews.

King expounds on the integration of his African American heritage and his aspiration for a heterogeneous society into the procedure. In her emphasis, Nyombayire highlights the significant influence of individual agency in catalyzing change and the inherent strength within each of us to champion ethical principles. She firmly asserts that the majority of people acknowledge the injustice of perpetrating harm against fellow community members. Still, she contends that it is the failure or lack of resolve to diverge from collective conformity that engenders widespread endorsement of mass atrocities by ordinary individuals. Her interaction with diplomats has illuminated the profound impact achievable through collaborative efforts with those who adamantly reject passivity.

Contrary to popular belief, individuals are capable of prioritizing the welfare of others over their own and making sacrifices for individuals whom they scarcely know. The profound impact of leveraging one's privileges to assist others is immeasurable, as exemplified by the families of those who were safeguarded through the issuance of visas.

Mehmet Ulkumen, the son of the Turkish diplomat, articulates his father's conviction, stating, "My father held the view that it is incumbent upon individuals to aid their fellow human beings. These individuals were akin to siblings to me, thus it became my duty to extend assistance to them, considering my ability to do so."

== Filming ==
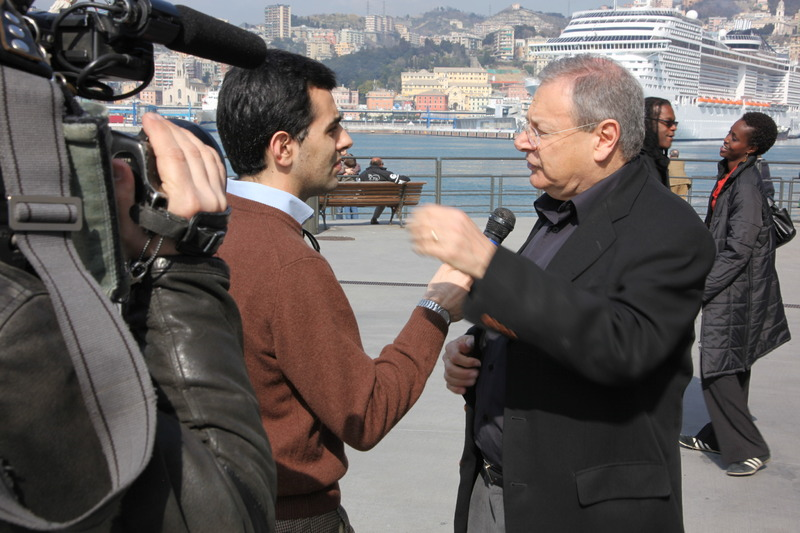
Sir Martin Gilbert Interview Genoa

Throughout the production of The Rescuers, the entire crew encountered significant emotional challenges, particularly Sir Martin Gilbert and Nyombayire, due to the sensitive subject matter. Sir Martin, a veteran of the film industry with over 40 years of experience, described this as his most emotionally demanding filmmaking experience. The profound tragedy and the visits to the locations where Jews were exterminated consistently overwhelmed him. Confronting the enormity and resilience of evil proved to be the most daunting task; however, he drew strength from the understanding that narrating the story of the rescuers was vital for persevering through hardships.

Throughout the film, Stephanie Nyombayire is confronted with harsh realities. She interviews Lieutenant General Romeo Dallaire, the former Force Commander of the United Nations Peacekeeping Force in Rwanda. In their face-to-face interaction, Dallaire elucidates the U.N.'s position: “With the onset of the genocide, my mandate as a U.N. Peacekeeper ceased. There was reluctance to embark on another mission in Africa, considering the recent debacle in Somalia a few months prior. The U.N. sought to circumvent involvement in another complex African issue and opted for a cost-effective approach, hoping for a self-resolving outcome. This approach implied a lack of significant consideration for Rwanda, a nation in Black Africa."

During her interview, Nyombayire expressed her response to those words as a recognition that little has changed. She asserts that history is recurring in Darfur, underscoring the unequal valuation of lives. Nyombayire stresses that she perceives it not merely as a matter of race, but rather as a reflection of the global community's priorities. She highlights that, during the Rwandan genocide, safeguarding one million innocent lives was not a focal point for the international community.

Nyombayire underscores the noteworthy parallels between the methodical preparations for the Holocaust and subsequent occurrences in other genocides, particularly the Rwandan genocide and the atrocities in Darfur. The dehumanization and strategic scheming evident at the Wannsee Villa resonated with the unfolding events in Rwanda. This contemplation prompts reflection on the tactics employed to persuade ordinary Rwandans to partake in the killings of their compatriots. Furthermore, Nyombayire underscores the ongoing suffering of the people of Darfur and the perpetual absence of substantial international intervention despite enduring similar crises for years.

In their scholarly exploration, Nyombayire and Sir Martin examined the preparatory groundwork associated with orchestrating the Holocaust and the Rwandan genocide, obtaining a more profound understanding of the diplomatic endeavors. Nyombayire articulated that the personal ramifications of her family's tragedy heightened the emotional resonance of the memorials. Her poignant reflections were intensified by the distressing recollections of her family members' dehumanization and brutal demise, accentuating her profound disillusionment with the international community's lack of action.

“As an individual who was fortunate enough to be outside of Rwanda during the genocide, I do not perceive myself as a direct victim of the failure to internalize the lessons from that tragic period. However, this viewpoint contrasts with the experiences of my family, who bore the brunt of both overlooked lessons and disregarded appeals for assistance. The most disquieting aspect for me is the realization that the genocide did not unfold suddenly; there existed opportunities for intervention that could have preserved hundreds of thousands of lives. It is disheartening that my family, along with one million other Rwandans, lost their lives not merely due to unlearned lessons, but also because the United Nations actively chose not to take action.”

The filming of The Rescuers presented not only emotional challenges but also logistical difficulties. Spanning 60 days, the production covered 15 countries and three continents, with a team of 20 individuals traveling by train across Europe while transporting 40 boxes of equipment. The production encountered visa issues, theft, and intermittent train delays or Breakdowns, prompting the unconventional decision to transport all equipment and crew from Bordeaux to Biarritz via bus. This decision posed a significant strain, particularly when navigating through stations with long distances to exit while carrying heavy loads due to the layout of certain stations with tunnels and stairs. To address these challenges, a truck and driver were hired, and arrangements were made to have the equipment meet the crew at different stations following similar incidents. The dedication and determination exhibited by the entire crew throughout this journey to share this story is admirable.

== 10th Anniversary screening ==
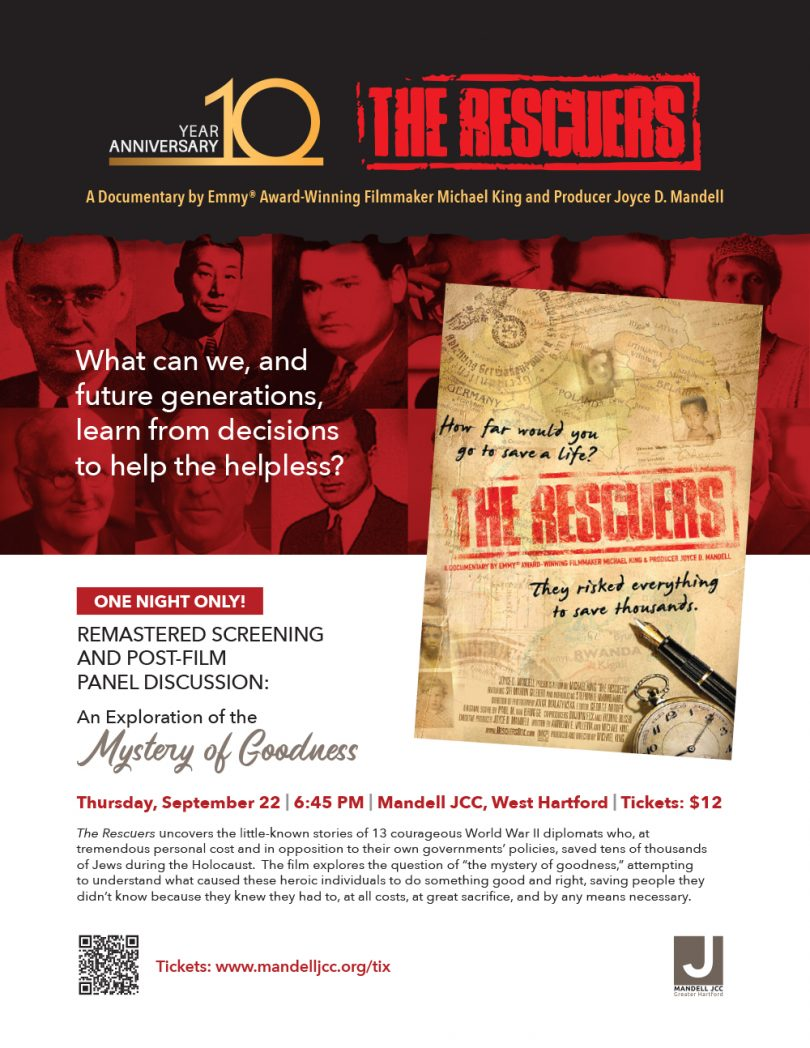
Poster for the 10th anniversary screening of The Rescuers

On Thursday, September 22, 2022, a remastered version of The Rescuers was shown for one night only at The Mandell JCC to commemorate the 10th anniversary of the film's release. The panel for the post-film discussion featured Debórah Dwork, PhD, director, Center for the Study of the Holocaust, Genocide, and Crimes Against Humanity The Graduate Center – City University of New York; Dr. Stephanie Fagin-Jones, clinical psychologist, Adjunct Associate Professor of Psychology at Columbia University Teachers College, and a Holocaust heroism science scholar; Joel N. Lohr, PhD, President of Hartford International University for Religion and Peace; and Dr. Sylvia Smoller, scientist, writer and Holocaust Survivor. The panel was moderated by Avinoam J. Patt, PhD , The Doris and Simon Konover Chair of Judaic Studies and Director of the Center for Judaic Studies and Contemporary Jewish Life at the University of Connecticut."Remastered Version Of 'The Rescuers' Film Screening Coming To Mandell JCC". WeHa.

== Screening on Capitol Hill ==
On May 6, 2024, the remastered version of The Rescuers was shown before Senators and members of Congress, commemorating Holocaust Remembrance Day Yom HaShoah and in support of The Forgotten Heroes of the Holocaust Congressional Gold Medal Act. The panel for a pre-film discussion featured Dr. Edmund Duckwitz, the Ambassador (ret.) of the Federal Republic of Germany; Birgitta Tazelaar, the Ambassador of the Kingdom of the Netherlands in the U.S.; and Ellen Germain, the U.S. State Department Special Envoy for Holocaust Issues. Peter Alexander, NBC Chief White House Correspondent, moderated the panel. Before the screening of the film, Director/Producer Michael W. King was presented with a Certificate of Special Congressional Recognition by Congressman John B. Larson for his accomplished 35 years of commitment and service to humanitarian and artistic endeavors.""WUSA". Vimeo. ""KNTV". Vimeo. ""WTTG". Vimeo.

== Rescuers Last Chance Project ==
The Rescuers - Last Chance Project
- Directed by: Michael W. King
- Written by: Robin Uriel Russin
- Produced by: Joyce D Mandell and Michael W. King
- Narrated by: Irena Steinfeldt
- Cinematography: Tarina Van Den Driessche
- Edited by: George Artope
- Production companies: Michael W. King Productions, LLC.
- Country: United States
- Language: English

Kwas approached in 2021 by the USC Shoah Foundation for the survivor testimonies from The Rescuers for their Visual History Archive. In building the testimonies for the Andrew J. and Joyce D. Mandell International Rescuers Collection"Connecticut filmmakers search for remaining diplomats who saved lives during Holocaust for Joyce D. Mndelll Rescuers Collection". Harford Courant., King decided to expand his research efforts to identify additional survivors and relatives to document the stories of additional diplomats with Righteous Among the Nations status. With that developed the Rescuers Last Chance Project, a "race against time" to identify the people who knew the remaining diplomats and Holocaust survivors who benefited from their assistance, in telling those stories."The Rescuers". IMDb.

=== Development ===
Michael W. King was approached in 2021 by the USC Shoah Foundation for the survivor testimonies from ‘The Rescuers’ for their Visual History Archive. In building the testimonies for the Andrew J. and Joyce D. Mandell International Rescuers Collection, King decided to expand his research efforts to identify additional survivors and relatives to document the stories of additional diplomats with Righteous Among the Nations status. With that developed “The Rescuer Last Chance Project,” a ‘race against time’ to identify the people who knew the remaining diplomats and Holocaust survivors who benefited from their assistance, to tell those stories.

Michael King directing Budapest 2024 Behind the scene Rescuers Last Chance Project

=== Filming ===
Across a span of two years, filming commenced in July of 2022 in Israel. Over the course of three months filming of survivors, second generation, and family members of the Righteous was done across Israel, Sweden, The Netherlands, France, Spain, and Portugal. In March of 2023, time was split between filming in Ecuador, the country of Righteous Manuel Antonio Munoz Borrero, and Brazil, the country of Righteous Aracy De Carvalho. Both family members and survivors, and 2nd gen were interviewed during this time. During July of 2023, production time was spent in Vancouver filming reenactments, and 2nd generation and survivor interviews. From there, filming was done on the other side of Canada, in Toronto, filming survivors and 2nd generation. In the starting months of 2024, filming was done in Phoenix, Arizona, Boca Raton, Florida, and Brooklyn, New York of family members of the Righteous and also of 2nd generation and survivors rescued by these diplomats. Production concluded on November 22nd with the filming of reenactments in Budapest, Hungary and the filming of the stepdaughter of Righteous Diplomat, Carl Lutz.

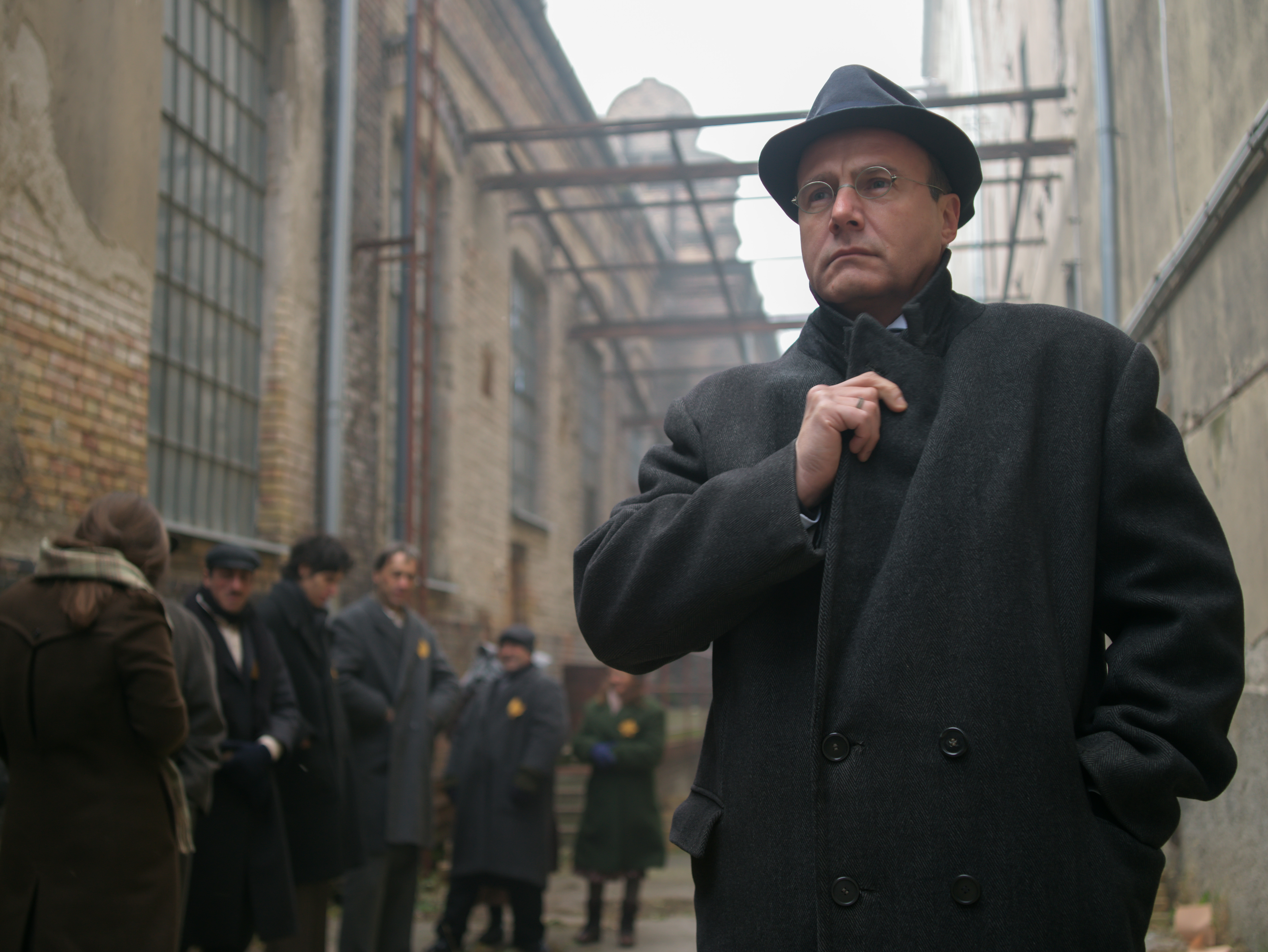
Budapest 2024 Behind the scene Rescuers Last Chance Project

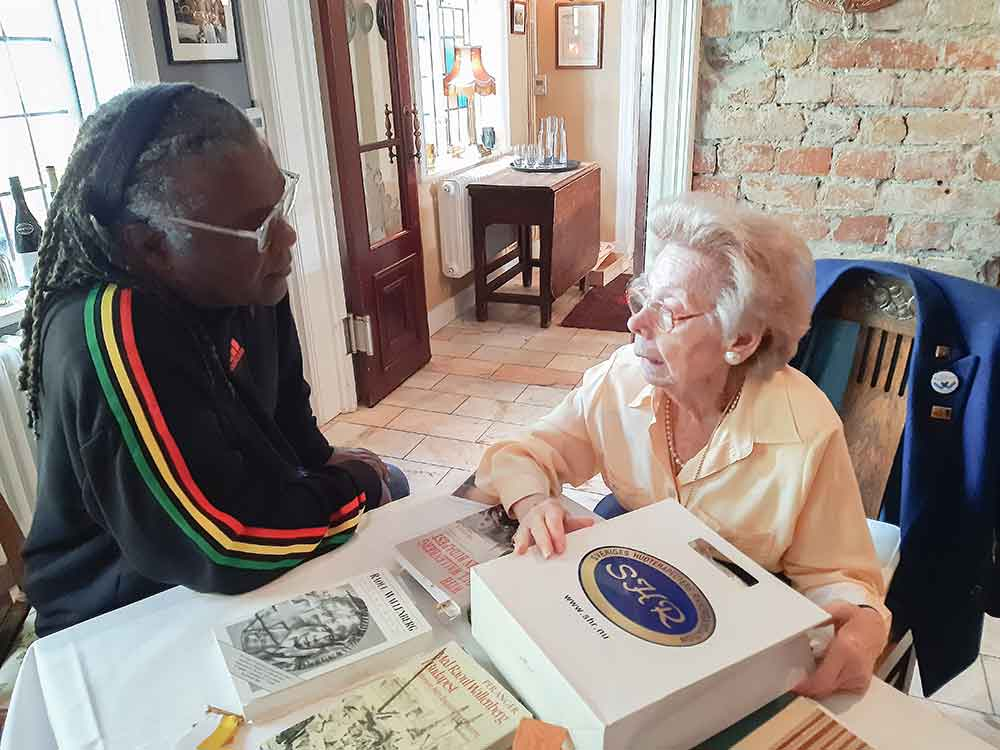
Michael King directing Behind the scene Rescuers Last Chance Project

=== Diplomats ===
Name	Position	Representative country	Location of operation
Aracy de Carvalho	Chief of the Passport Office	Brazil	Hamburg
Carl and Gertrud Lutz	Vice-Consul and Chief of Foreign Interests	Switzerland	Budapest
Chiune Sugihara	Consul	Japan	Kaunas
Dr. Aristides De Sousa Mendes	Consul-General	Portugal	Bordeaux
Dr. Manuel Antonio Muñoz Borrero	Consul	Ecuador	Stockholm
Georg Ferdinand Duckwitz	Maritime Attaché	Germany	Copenhagen
Hiram Bingham IV	Vice Consul in the visa section	US	Marseille
Jan Zwartendijk	Acting Consul	Netherlands	Kaunas
Princess Alice of Battenberg	Volunteer for the Red Cross	UK	Athens
Raoul Wallenberg	Special Attaché	Sweden	Budapest
Selahattin Ülkümen	Consul-General	Turkey	Italian Rhodes
Varian Fry	Representative of the American Emergency Rescue Committee	US	Occupied France

=== Notes ===
- WeHa News
- Hartford Courant
- NUNCA ESQUECER
- YNetNews
- algemeiner
- .filme cărți
- VARIETY
- THE Hollywood REPORTER
- IWITNESS
- THE JEWISH CHRONICLE
- Film Screening and Talkback with Director Michael King and Executive Producer Joyce Mandell

== Music ==
The musical score for The Rescuers was composed by Dutch composer Paul M. van Brugge, known for his work on over 70 feature films. The Sofia Soloists Orchestra of Bulgaria performed the soundtrack. King, the director, specifically sought out a composer who could incorporate European influences into the score. Van Brugge's connection to the story, stemming from his family's history of having to leave Holland, further fueled his enthusiasm for the project.

Throughout the film, van Brugge skillfully incorporated traditional instruments representative of each country, thereby creating a distinct and culturally rich auditory experience. Regarding this approach, King noted, "We selected instruments that are emblematic of each diplomat's homeland, enriching their narratives and contributing to a diverse and dynamic soundtrack." The specific instruments employed included the Guitar for Spain and Portugal, Accordion for France, Koto and Taiko for Japan, Bouzouki and Saz (bağlama) for Turkey, a Lur-like instrument for Denmark, Banjo for England, Clarinet for Poland, and Cimbalom and Violin for Hungary.

== Themes ==
In The Rescuers, a critical examination of altruism reveals the complexity of benevolent deeds. The lack of testimonies from the individuals who undertook these exceptional acts of kindness leaves us to conjecture. Sir Martin Gilbert posits the existence of both virtuous and unethical persons. The virtuous may be driven by religious faith, parental guidance, or a profound personal grasp of principles such as morality and autonomous choice – the capacity to act based on one's conscience, even in challenging circumstances. Education, upbringing, and religion are the three foundational elements of society, all of which have the potential to instill individuals with a strong ethical framework. The efficacy of these foundations was exemplified by the rescuers.

In contemplating the events, King questions the passive stance of onlookers and underscores the mystery surrounding their inaction. He underscores the significance of preventing such tragedies from affecting any family and stresses the humanitarian value inherent in each individual's narrative. King advocates for the incorporation of these values into the education of our children and within society. Historically, individuals who have been overlooked and frequently penalized for opposing government policies, despite their commendable actions in saving lives, should be embraced.

The aforementioned diplomats, whose identities largely remain unknown, refrained from publicizing their actions or pursuing personal gain. Their altruistic motivations were devoid of self-interest and were driven by a strong sense of duty, without seeking recognition or recompense.

"I believe that by sharing this narrative, we can inspire others to scrutinize why acts of kindness are perceived as uncommon rather than prevalent. This encounter has fortified my determination to devise measures that will relegate genocide or attempts at genocide to the annals of history," Nyombayire remarks. "It instills in me a sense of hope that if individuals were willing to jeopardize their lives, careers, and families to rescue others, perhaps this level of altruism could become the norm rather than the exception.”

It is worth noting that King and Billy Bingham had been childhood friends. Billy was the son of Hiram Bingham IV, who served as the Vice-Consul at the American Consulate in Marseille, France. Along with Varian Fry, Bingham was involved in saving tens of thousands of Jews, among them renowned figures such as Marc Chagall and other prominent artists and writers. King remarked, "We attended school together from our early years through college. Even Billy was unaware of his father's actions until after his father's passing." "They knew he was a diplomat, but that was the extent of their knowledge. Following his death, a box containing letters and papers from the people he had rescued was discovered behind the fireplace. It is perplexing to me. Why would someone who performed such an extraordinary act keep it a secret, not even sharing it with his family?"

King's analysis suggests that the generation under consideration opted for silence in the aftermath of the war, choosing to move forward without discussion. He observes that, as is typical of human nature, there is a tendency to avoid deliberating on the war and to reflect on the trade-off between lives saved and lives lost.

== Cast ==
Name	Description
Stephanie Nyombayire	Anti-genocide activist
Sir Martin Gilbert	Author, historian, Holocaust expert
Irena Steinfeldt	Director, Department of the Righteous, Yad Vashem – The Holocaust Martyrs' and Heroes' Remembrance Authority
Mehmet Ulkumen	Son of Selahattin Ulkumen
Bernard Turiel	Survivor
Elliot Turiel	Survivor
Michael Kaufman	Survivor
Leo Goldberger	Survivor
Gustav Goldberger	Survivor
Christian Bauker	Survivor
Inge Samson	Survivor
Michael Samson	Son of survivor
Dr. Sylvia Smoller	Survivor
Berl Schor	Survivor
Peter Vagi	Survivor
H.R.H. Prince Charles	The Prince of Wales
Christian Bauker	Diplomat
Ambassador Maciej Kozlowsk	Polish Ministry of Foreign Affairs
Senator Romeo Dallaire	The General (Retired) who commanded the United Nations Assistance Mission for Rwanda (UNAMIR)
Agnes Hirschi	Daughter of Carl Lutz

== Diplomats ==
Name	Country
Princess Alice of Battenberg	United Kingdom
Carl Lutz	Switzerland
Chiune Sugihara	Japan
Georg Duckwitz	Germany
Jan Zwartendijk	Holland
Hiram Bingham IV	USA
Aristides de Sousa Mendes	Portugal
Henryk Sławik	Poland
Varian Fry	USA
Frank Foley	Great Britain
Raoul Wallenberg	Sweden
Nuncio Angelo Rotta	Budapest
Monsignor Gennaro Verolino	Budapest
Selahattin Ülkümen	Turkey

== Awards ==
Film festival awards include:

2011
New York International Film Festival	Winner Best Historical Documentary
Palm Springs Int’l Film Festival	Winner ‘Best of the Fest’
Palm Beach Int’l Film Festival	Winner Best Documentary
Beloit Int’l Film Festival	Winner Best Documentary, Best Soundtrack
Monaco Int’l Film Festival	Winner Best Narration Documentary, Feature Film Humanitarian Award
Santa Fe Independent Film Festival	Official Selection
Montreal World Film Festival	Official Selection
Boston Film Festival	Official Selection
AFI/Discovery Channel Silverdocs Doc Festival	Official Selection
Film Society of Lincoln Center	Official Selection
Athena Film Festival	Official Selection
Miami Jewish Film Festival	Official Selection
Hong Kong Jewish Film Festival	Official Selection
Kansas City Film Festival	Official Selection
UK Jewish Film Festival	Official Selection
Seattle Int’l Film Festival	Official Selection
Jewish Eye World Jewish Film Festival	Official Selection
Atlanta Jewish Film Festival	Official Selection
Atlanta Jewish Film Festival	Official Selection
NAACP Image Awards	Official Selection
NAACP Image Awards	Official Selection
2012
Hartford Jewish Film Festival	Official Selection
NAACP Image Awards	Nominee, Outstanding Documentary
Cleveland Int’l Film Festival	Winner, Focus on Filmmaker
Buffalo Jewish Film Festival	Official Selection
Detroit Jewish Film Festival	Official Selection
Portland Jewish Film Festival	Official Selection
IMAGE AWARD Outstanding Documentary	Official Selection
Zagreb Jewish Film Festival	Official Selection

== Notes ==
- .filme cărți
- Variety
- The Hollywood Reporter
- Iwitness
- The Jewish Chronicle
- Film Screening and Talkback with Director Michael King and Executive Producer Joyce Mandell
- United Nations Ciné ONU Vienna film screening of The Rescuers
- WUSA 9 (CBS)
- algemeiner
