= Valley Beth Shalom =

Conservative synagogue in Los Angeles, California, United States

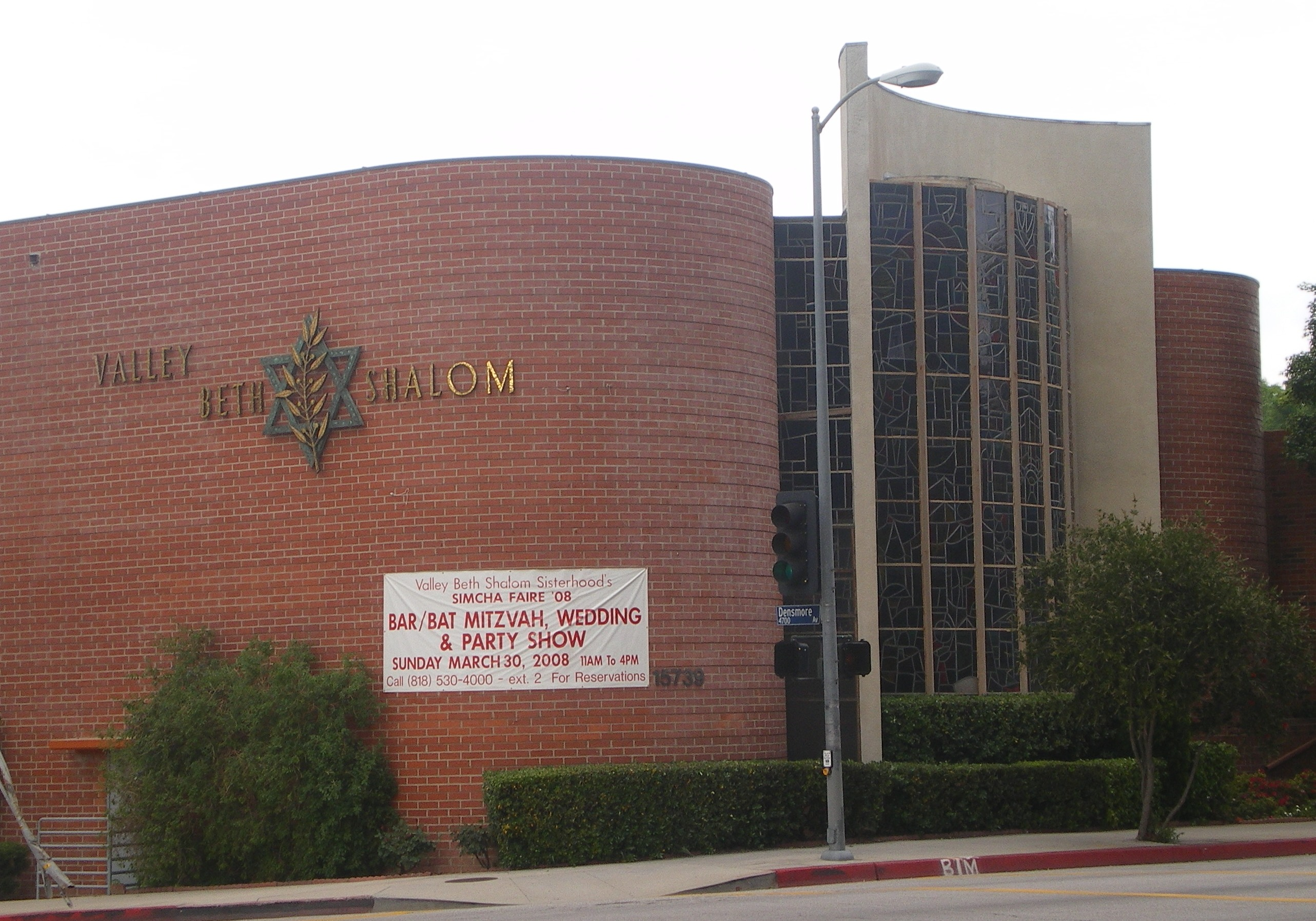
- Valley Beth Shalom synagogue

- Location in Los Angeles

Religion
- Affiliation: Conservative Judaism
- Ecclesiastical or organizational status: Synagogue
- Leadership: Rabbi Nolan Lebovitz; Rabbi Ed Feinstein; Rabbi Nina Bieber Feinstein; Rabbi Yael Aranoff; Rabbi Avi Kushlan
- Status: Active

Location
- Location: 15739 Ventura Boulevard, Encino, Los Angeles, California
- Country: United States of America
- Interactive map of Valley Beth Shalom
- Coordinates: 34°09′20.19″N 118°28′36.68″W

Architecture
- Established: c. 1950s
- Completed: c. 1980s

Website
- www.vbs.org

Valley Beth Shalom (informally called VBS) is a Conservative synagogue at 15739 Ventura Boulevard in Encino, Los Angeles, California, in the United States. With approximately 1,500 member families, it is one of the largest synagogues in Los Angeles and one of the largest Conservative synagogues in the United States.

Newsweek included the synagogue on its 2009 list of America's 25 Most Vibrant Congregations, saying, "Valley Beth Shalom continues to be one of America's most relevant and community-minded synagogues."

== History ==
Valley Beth Shalom was formed in the 1950s through the merger of three small synagogues, and was initially named Valley Beth Sholom (sic.), located on Sepulveda Boulevard. In the 1970s, Rabbi Harold M. Schulweis became a driving force in the expansion of the congregation and the current synagogue was completed during his tenure in the late 1980s.

== Overview ==
The clergy include Senior Rabbi Nolan Lebovitz, Rabbis Ed Feinstein, Nina Bieber Feinstein, Yael Aranoff, and Avi Kushlan, and Cantor Jacqueline Rafii. Rabbi Harold M. Schulweis, arguably one of the most influential and renowned rabbis of his generation, was rabbi for many decades as well, serving in this capacity until his death in 2014.

The synagogue launched the Jewish World Watch, an NGO founded by Schulweis and Janice Kamenir-Reznik, and is a founding member of the Havurah movement.

On Yom Ha'atzmaut 2003 (6 May), a Molotov cocktail was thrown through one of the synagogue's stained-glass windows. Mayor James K. Hahn said, "These are acts of terrorism, they're acts of hatred, and they tear at the very fabric of our community."

== Gallery ==
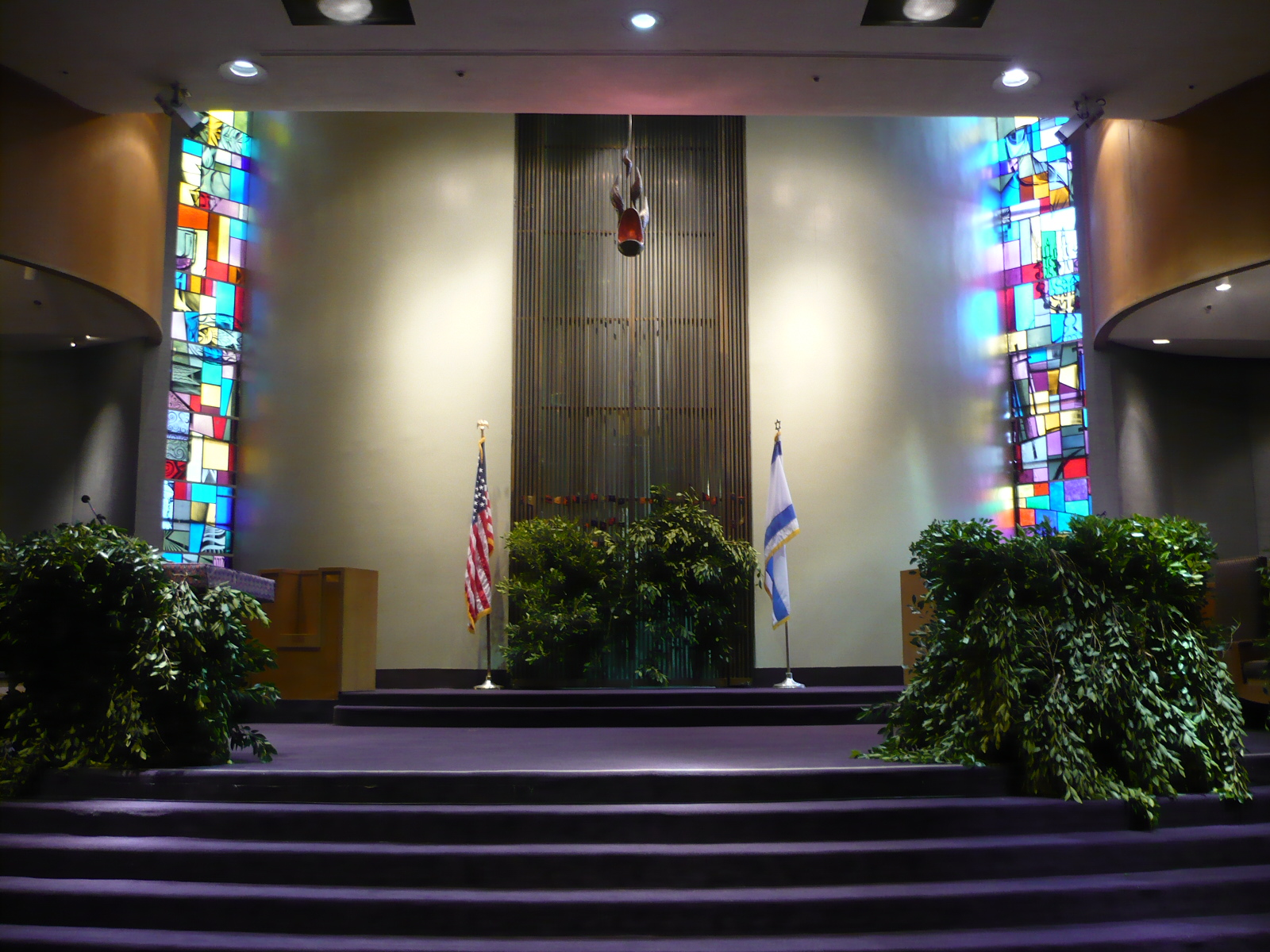
The bimah of the main sanctuary before Shavuot 2008
