= Jacob's Rescue =

1993 book by Malka Drucker and Michael Halperin

- Author: Malka Drucker and Michael Halperin
- Publisher: Yearling
- Publication date: 1993
- ISBN: 978-0-440-40965-6

Jacob's Rescue is a 1993 children's book by Malka Drucker and Michael Halperin based on a true story that takes place in Warsaw, Poland during the Holocaust. A poor Polish family rescues Jacob and his brothers from the tyranny of the Nazis where they face the reality of life under the harshest conditions.

== Development ==
Michael Halperin discovered the story when he was told about two brothers who endured the hardships of the Holocaust. Halperin received a grant from the National Endowment for the Humanities to develop a screenplay based on the story that became the basis for "Jacob's Rescue". Shortly after the screenplay was completed, Halperin arranged for the Roslans to fly to Israel in order to celebrate Passover with Jacob and David. It was the first time all four were together since they said goodbye at a rail station in Berlin.

== Historical account ==
Jacob and David Gutgeld were rescued by a Catholic Polish family, headed by Alex and Mela Roslan, who kept them safe from Nazi eyes and Polish collaborators for over four years. At the end of World War II, Jacob and David were reunited with their father, who had fled to what was then known as Palestine. Jacob received his doctorate from the Weitzmann Institute of Science, Rehovot, Israel. David received his doctorate in mathematics at the University of California, Berkeley and returned to Israel. Alex and Mela Roslan were honored by the Simon Wiesenthal Center in Los Angeles and have a garden planted in their honor on the Avenue of the Righteous at the Yad Vashem Holocaust Memorial in Jerusalem.

== Plot synopsis ==
Jacob Gutgeld struggles against hope until a Polish family, the Roslans, rescue him from the Warsaw Ghetto. During his stay with the Roslans, he's reunited with his uncle who is able to pass as non-Jewish and, at his request, the Roslans take in Jacob's younger brother Sholom who has been mistreated and is in an emaciated and fragile state. Not long after Sholom's arrival, the family faces scarlet fever. Jacob's, as well as the Roslan daughter's, isn't that serious, but the son, Yurek's is and he has to go to the hospital. Sholom's is also more serious due to his weakened state, but he can't go to the hospital or risk being found out so the uncle, a doctor, does his best to treat him. The Roslan children and Jacob recover, but Sholom's condition continually deteriorates with his kidneys starting to shut down until one night he wakes up with a high fever and after being taken to the bathroom for some water, dies in Alex's arms.

Not long after, Jacob ends up facing a serious ear infection, a side-effect from his scarlet fever, and the Roslans are forced to sell their apartment so they can get the money they need for a bribe so Jacob can get life-saving surgery. After the rest of the family dies in the ghetto, the uncle brings Jacob's other brother, David, to live with the family, believing its only a matter of time until he's found out and wants to make sure David is in good hands.

After word of a Russian counterattack against the Germans reaches the Roslan household, Yurek rushes out to celebrate and is killed by a German sniper. Eventually, the family decides to abandon Warsaw when it gets too dangerous and go to live with Mela's brother in the countryside, in a place where there are no Germans. They spend the rest of the war there until Poland is liberated. At one point near the end of the story, Russian soldiers march through the town and one enters the house where the family is staying and he and Jacob embrace each other and reveal that they are both Jewish.

After the war, the family travels to Berlin to see if they can locate any surviving family for Jacob and David. Their father is located, having fled Poland for Palestine before the war. Jacob and David are sent to live with him, even though they prefer the Roslans at this point.
