= Port Djema =

1997 film

- Directed by: Eric Heumann
- Written by: Eric Heumann; Jacques Lebas
- Produced by: Marc Soustras
- Starring: Jean-Yves Dubois; Nathalie Boutefeu
- Cinematography: Giorgos Arvanitis
- Music by: Sanjay Mishra (soundtrack)
- Release date: 23 April 1997
- Running time: 95 minutes
- Country: France
- Language: French

Port Djema is a 1997 French drama film directed by Eric Heumann. It was entered into the 47th Berlin International Film Festival where Heumann won the Silver Bear for Best Director. The music for the film was written by Sanjay Mishra and released as a soundtrack album called Port Djema.

== Cast ==
- Jean-Yves Dubois as Pierre Feldman
- Nathalie Boutefeu as Alice
- Christophe Odent as Jérôme Delbos
- Edouard Montoute as Ousman
- Frédéric Pierrot as Antoine Barasse
- Claire Wauthion as Sister Marie-Françoise
- Frédéric Andréi

== Soundtrack ==
Port Djema

Soundtrack album by Sanjay Mishra
- Released: 1997
- Label: PolyGram

Sanjay Mishra chronology
Blue Incantation (1995)	Port Djema (1997)	Rescue (2000)

Guitarist Sanjay Mishra contributed the music for the soundtrack, released in 1997.

=== Track listing ===
All music composed and arranged by Sanjay Mishra, except for "Amaldu" by Abeba Haile.

1. For Julia
2. Lullaby
3. Amaldu
4. Mirage
5. Ambient sounds
6. Incidental music 1
7. Ambient sounds
8. Incidental Music 2
9. Passage into dawn
10. Ambient sounds
11. Incidental music 3
12. Ambient percussion / Amaldu
13. Incidental music 4
14. Manali
15. For Julia (reprise)
