= The Crossing (Sanjay Mishra album) =

Studio album by Sanjay Mishra
- Released: 1993
- Label: Akar Music, City Hall Records

Sanjay Mishra chronology
The Crossing (1993)	Blue Incantation (1995)

The Crossing is an album by guitarist Sanjay Mishra. His first album, it was released in 1993.

== Track listing ==
All songs written by Sanjay Mishra

1. "Country and Eastern"
2. "Takes Two To"
3. "Rendezvous"
4. "Lullaby"
5. "City of Joy"
6. "The Crossing"
7. "Manali"
8. "Cantico"
9. "Attack of The Killer Bees"
10. "By Twilight"
11. "Mirage"
12. "Invocation"

== Personnel ==
- Sanjay Mishra – MIDI nylon string electric guitar with photon MIDI converter
- Broto Roy – percussion
- Grover Tigue – electric bass
- Meg Kimmel, Aniko Debreceny – flutes on tracks 2 and 11
- Malashri Prasad – sampled voice on tracks 6 and 10
