= Harold M. Schulweis =

American Conservative rabbi and author (1925-2014)

- Born: April 14, 1925; The Bronx, New York, US
- Died: December 18, 2014 (aged 89); Encino, California, US
- Education: Yeshiva University; Jewish Theological Seminary; New York University; Pacific School of Religion
- Occupation: Rabbi
- Spouse: Malkah Schulweis
- Children: 3

Harold M. Schulweis (April 14, 1925 – December 18, 2014) was an American rabbi and author. He was the longtime spiritual Leader at Valley Beth Shalom in Encino, California.

== Biography ==
Schulweis was born in the Bronx, New York City, in 1925 to secular Jewish parents who respected Zionism and Jewish traditions. His father was an editor of The Jewish Daily Forward. His early Jewish education was influenced by his grandfather, Rabbi Avraham Rezak, who introduced him to the Talmud. In 1945, Schulweis graduated from Yeshiva University with a degree in philosophy. Later, Schulweis enrolled at the Jewish Theological Seminary of America, where he studied under Mordecai Kaplan and Abraham Joshua Heschel. Schulweis also studied philosophy at New York University, where he met his wife, Malkah. He received a doctorate in theology from the Pacific School of Religion.

== Rabbinical career ==
Schulweis began his career as the rabbi of Temple Beth Abraham, a Conservative Jewish congregation in Oakland, California, in 1952. Among the innovations he introduced were the inclusion of women in minyanim and bat mitzvah ceremonies for girls. Instead of sermons, he used the allotted time for questions and answers.

In 1970, he became senior rabbi at Valley Beth Shalom in Encino, California, where he stayed until his death in 2014.

Schulweis has been criticized by the religious right for his interfaith and conversion programs and open inclusion of homosexuals. The ultra-nationalist rabbi Meir Kahane criticized Schulweis for allowing a pro-Palestine Liberation Organization Arab member of the Knesset to speak at his synagogue, but refusing to extend the same opportunity to Kahane (who was also a Knesset member at the time). Newsweek called him "the leading Conservative rabbi of his generation," and placed him 13th on their list of the Top 50 Rabbis in America. He was formally affiliated with the Conservative movement, and was considered to have been a leading authority and theologian of Reconstructionist Judaism, as well.

== Human rights and Jewish activism ==
Schulweis was instrumental in the creation of the Chavurah movement in the late 1960s. He served as a technical advisor for Judaism-themed episodes of The Simpsons, as well.

In 1962, Schulweis founded the Jewish Foundation for Christian Rescuers. In 1986, Schulweis, rabbi Malka Drucker, and Gay Block decided to document the activities of non-Jews who rescued Jews during the Shoah—a topic they considered both important and under-publicized. Their work would eventually lead to a book (Rescuers: Portraits of Moral Courage in the Holocaust), as well as an exhibition of Block's photographs.

Also in 1986, Schulweis established the Jewish Foundation for the Righteous (originally called the Institute for Righteous Acts) to fulfill the traditional Jewish commitment to Hakarat HaTov—the searching for and recognition of non-Jews who had rescued Jews during the Shoah who were presently in need. The foundation started out funding eight rescuers; the number would eventually reach 1750. It currently supports more than 850 rescuers in 23 countries. The foundation also pursues a national Holocaust education program. The goal of the program is to educate middle and high school teachers about the history of the Holocaust, and to provide them with the resources to integrate their learning into their classrooms.

In 2004, Schulweis co-founded Jewish World Watch, a non-profit human rights watchdog, with his long-time friend and congregant Janice Kamenir-Reznik.

== Personal life ==
Schulweis married Malkah Savod in 1948, and together they had three children.

== Death ==
Schulweis had heart disease for many years, and died at his home in Encino, California on December 18, 2014. He was 89.

== Published works ==
- Evil and the Morality of God, (1983)
- In God's Mirror: Reflections and Essays, (1990)
- For Those Who Can't Believe: Overcoming the Obstacles to Faith, (1994)
- Meditations and Prayers for the Renewal of the Body and the Renewal of the Spirit, (2000)
- Finding Each Other in Judaism: Meditations on the Rites of Passage from Birth to Immortality, (2001)
- When You Lie Down and When You Rise Up: Nightstand Meditations, (2001)
- Conscience: The Duty to Obey and the Duty to Disobey, (2008)

=== Articles ===
- We Dare Not Murder Memories of Genocide

=== Articles in Sh'ma Magazine ===
- Hope and Faith (2004)
- Confronting the Angel of Death (1996)
- When Lucy Cohen's Mother Is Not Jewish (1994)
- If I Were an Orthodox Rabbi (1989)
- Jewish Isolation After the Holocaust (1988)
- Polarizing Movements-and Our People (1985)
- The Limits of Spero's Argument (1983)
- When Ethics and Halacha Collide (1979)
- We Need Women Conservative Rabbis (1979)
- When Dissent is Not a Virtue (1976)

Full list on BJPA.org

== Filmography ==
- Like Father, Like Clown - The Simpsons (Season Three, Episode 6) - Special Technical Consultant

== Awards ==
- 2008: National Jewish Book Award for Conscience: The Duty to Obey and The Duty to Disobey

== See also ==
- American philosophy
- List of American philosophers
