= Sanjay Mishra (musician) =

Indian American musician

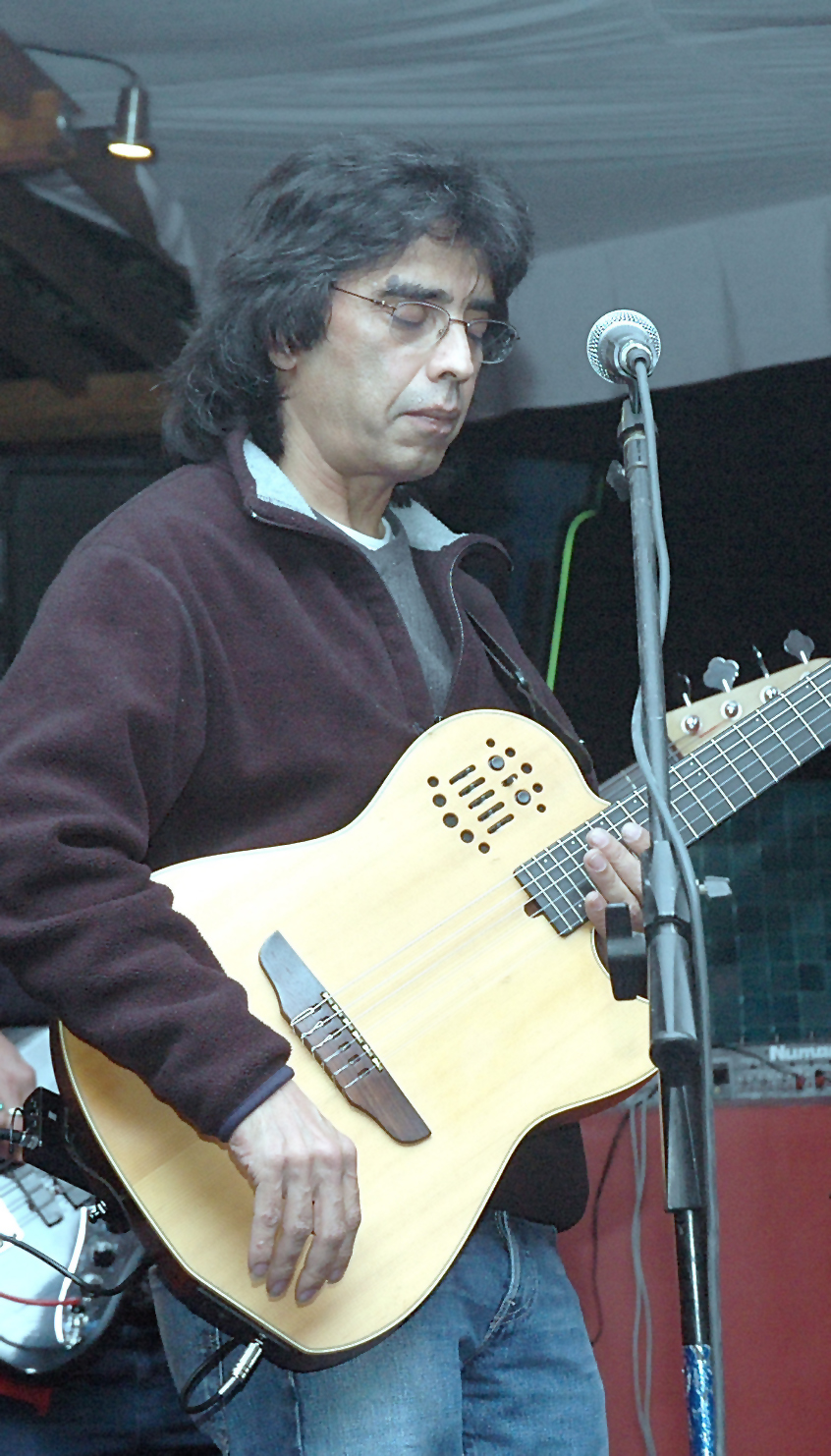

Background information
- Born: Calcutta, India
- Genres: jam, fusion, classical, contemporary chamber music
- Occupation: musician
- Instrument: guitar
- Years active: 1985–present
- Labels: Akar Music, City Hall Records

Sanjay Mishra is an Indian-American musician who began performing after completing his studies at the Peabody Conservatory of Music. Mishra plays with an eclecticism well suited to his multicultural background combining both Eastern and Western influences. He has been quoted saying, "I come from a tradition that has a lot of improvisation. Sometimes Western classical music can seem a little rigid, I had to find some middle ground."

== Education ==
He graduated from the Peabody Conservatory of Music, Johns Hopkins University in 1987.

== Early career ==
Mishra first came to public acclaim for his album Blue Incantation with guitarist Jerry Garcia of The Grateful Dead. It is one of Garcia's last works. Tributes to Garcia's work occur in Mishra's concerts.

== Present and future ==
His album Chateau Benares (October 2006) with guest appearances by DJ Logic and Keller Williams, among others, was received with rave reviews on National Public Radio and in The Washington Post.

He has also composed music for films. His score for the French film Port Djema was presented The Lifetime Vision Award at the Hamptons Film Festival in New York and described as "hauntingly beautiful". The film won The Golden Bear at The Berlin Film Festival in 1996.

Mishra primarily records on Akar Music, distributed by City Hall Records in San Rafael, CA. His music has also been released on PolyGram, Philips, EMI Records, Mercury, Ryko, Putumayo, Melodia and other labels. He is author of Guitar Atlas: India, published by Alfred enhanced by Sanjay's "intimate knowledge of the relationship between Indian music and the guitar".

He taught audio production at The Georgetown University in Washington, D.C from 2006 to 2011

== Discography ==
=== Albums ===
- The Crossing (1993)
- Blue Incantation (1995) – with Jerry Garcia
- Port Djema (1997) – soundtrack
- Rescue (2000) – with Dennis Chambers and Samir Chatterjee
- Chateau Benares (2006)
- Lamplighter (2014)
- Duets (2020) - with Garrett Gleason

=== Compilations ===
- Music From the Tea Lands (2000) Putumayo World
- Deep Orient, Vol. 2 (2001) Melodia (France)
- Indian Spirit – 3 (2009) EMI Records

=== Guest appearances ===
- Trusty – Goodbye, Dr. Fate (1995)
- Dream (2007)

=== Publishing ===
- Guitar Atlas: India published by Alfred Publishing
