= Animal rescue =

Animal rescue or pet rescue may refer to:

- Animal rescue group, organizations dedicated to the rescue of animals, including pets, from shelters, to homes
- Animal Rescue Foundation, San Francisco Bay Area based charity dedicated to pet adoption and other animal welfare works
- Animal sanctuary, sites dedicated to caring permanently for rescued wild or domestic animals
- Animal welfare, a general term for the well-being of animals, more specifically the idea of activism towards increasing the well-being of animals
- International Animal Rescue, international organization dedicated to animal welfare
- Pet adoption, adoption of pets that have been abandoned by previous owners
- Rescue dog, dogs placed in homes, from shelters
- Wildlife rehabilitation, the process of caring for wild animals, with the intent of returning them to their natural environment

== Entertainment ==
- RSPCA Animal Rescue, Australian reality TV series
- Pet Rescue (TV series), British reality TV series
- The Drop, previously titled Animal Rescue, 2014 film
- "Pet Rescue" (My Hero), a 2002 television episode
- Pet Rescue Saga, a mobile game

== See also ==
- Animal rights
- Animal shelter
- Rescue (disambiguation)
