= Impostora (2017 TV series) =

Philippine television drama series

- Title card
- Genre: Drama
- Created by: R.J. Nuevas
- Based on: Sa Isang Sulok ng mga Pangarap (1993) by Joel Lamangan
- Written by: Denoy Navarro-Punio; Angeli Delgado; John Kenneth de Leon; Marlon Miguel
- Directed by: Albert Langitan; Aya Topacio
- Creative director: Roy C. Iglesias
- Starring: Kris Bernal
- Narrated by: Kris Bernal as Nimfa / Rosette
- Opening theme: "Mapagkunwari" by Rita Daniela
- Country of origin: Philippines
- Original language: Tagalog
- No. of episodes: 160 (list of episodes)

Production
- Executive producer: Joseph T. Aleta
- Producers: Keila Marie Celso; Marissa Jesuitas-Hilario
- Camera setup: Multiple-camera setup
- Running time: 23–30 minutes
- Production company: GMA Entertainment TV

Original release
- Network: GMA Network
- Release: July 3, 2017 – February 9, 2018

Related
- Impostora (2007)

Impostora (transl. impostor) is a Philippine television drama series broadcast by GMA Network. The series is loosely based on a 1993 Philippine film, Sa Isang Sulok ng mga Pangarap (transl. In a Corner of Dreams). Directed by Albert Langitan and Aya Topacio, it stars Kris Bernal in the title role. It premiered on July 3, 2017 on the network's Afternoon Prime line up. The series concluded on February 9, 2018, with a total of 160 episodes.

The series is streaming online on YouTube.

== Premise ==
Nimfa, a street vendor willingly undergoes surgery and facial reconstruction and is ordered to pretend to be Rosette. When Rosette returns to take Nimfa out of the picture, she will attempt to kidnap and murder Nimfa.

== Cast and characters ==
Cast

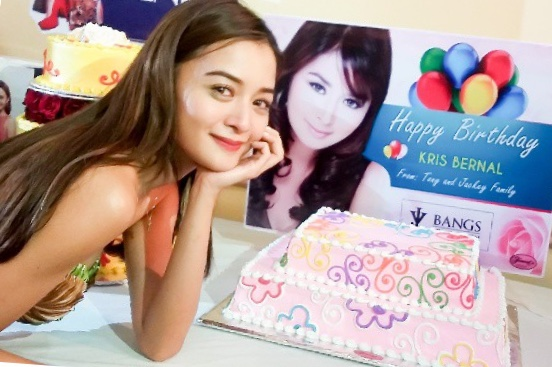
Kris Bernal

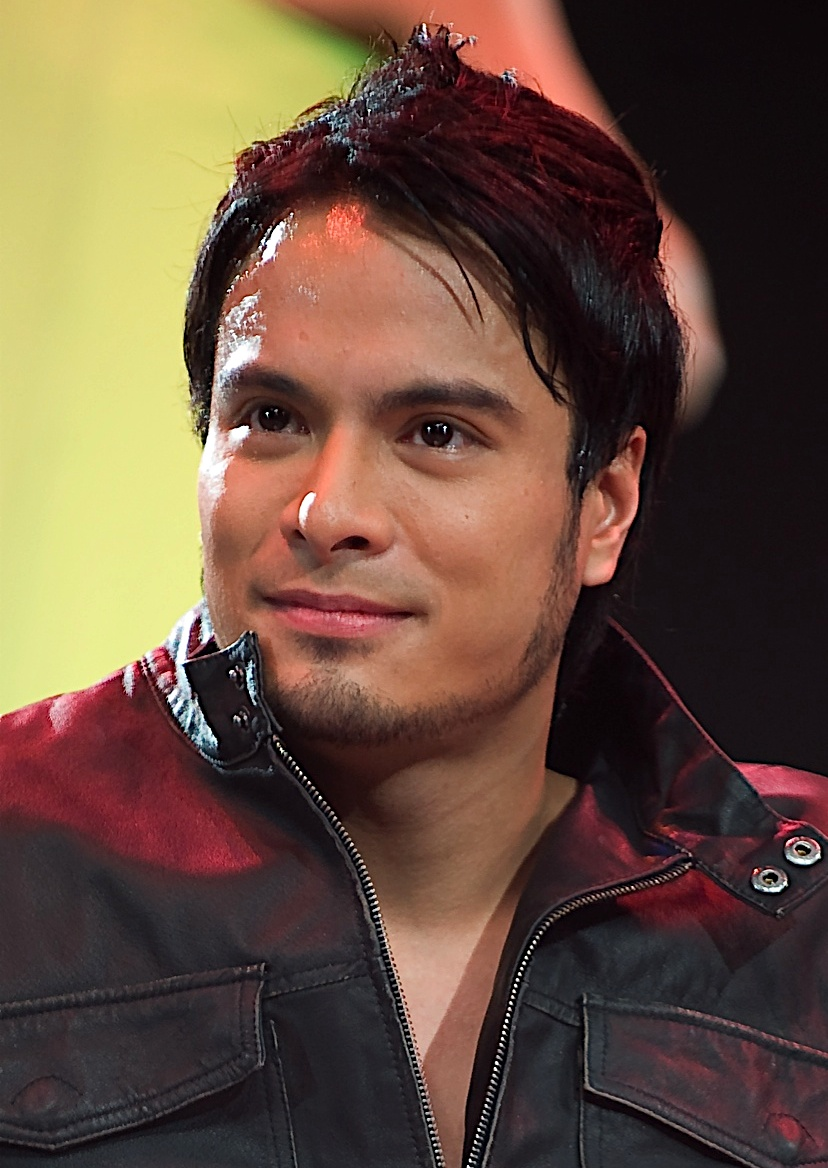
Rafael Rosell

Lead cast

- Kris Bernal as Nimfa del Prado-Saavedra / Rosario Margaret "Rosette" R. Cuevas

Supporting cast

- Rafael Rosell as Homer Saavedra
- Ryan Eigenmann as Jeremy Soriano
- Assunta de Rossi as Katrina "Trina" Saavedra
- Elizabeth Oropesa as Magdalena "Denang" Del Prado
- Aicelle Santos as Deedee Castro
- Vaness del Moral as Criselda "Crisel" Estanislao
- Leandro Baldemor as Jomari "Omar" Estanislao
- Sinon Loresca as Maximo "Maxi" Cuntapay
- Rita Daniela as Maureen Mendoza
- Yuan Francisco as Junic C. Saavedra
- Dayara Shane as Celine C. Saavedra
- James Blanco as Enrico "Eric" Espiritu
- Jervy "Patani" Daño as Juliet

Guest cast

- Djanin Cruz as Nancy Pineda
- Renz Fernandez as Mateo Reyes
- Aaron Yanga as Celso
- Jay Arcilla as Alvin
- Chariz Solomon as Fatima del Prado
- Jerald Napoles as Oliver del Prado
- Nanette Inventor as Remedios
- Ranty Portento as a sales agent
- Dex Quindoza as David
- Jaycee Parker as Esther
- Sophie Albert as Leticia
- Frank Garcia as Dante Cuevas
- Sheryl Cruz as Bettina "Betty" Romero
- Marc Abaya as Leo Corpuz
- Rob Sy as Emelito "Lito" Perez
- Sheena Halili as Rafaela "Riffy" Maniego / Rosette Cuevas
- Jade Lopez as Danica Santillan

== Production ==
Principal photography commenced in February 2017. Filming concluded on January 29, 2018. Due to high ratings, the series was given an extension up to February 9, 2018.

== Ratings ==
According to AGB Nielsen Philippines' Nationwide Urban Television Audience Measurement People in television homes, the pilot episode of Impostora earned a 5.3% rating. The final episode scored a 7.4% rating. The series had its highest rating on July 28, 2017 with an 8.8% rating.

== Accolades ==
Accolades received by Impostora
| Year | Award | Category | Recipient | Result | Ref. |
|---|---|---|---|---|---|
| 2017 | 7th OFW Gawad Parangal | Best Actress | Kris Bernal | Won | |
| 2017 | 31st PMPC Star Awards for Television | Best Daytime Drama Series | Impostora | Nominated | |
| 2017 | 31st PMPC Star Awards for Television | Best Drama Actress | Kris Bernal | Nominated | |
