= List of Impostora (2017) episodes =

Philippine television series

Impostora (transl. Impostor) is a Philippine television drama series broadcast by GMA Network. The series is loosely based on the 1993 film, Sa Isang Sulok ng mga Pangarap (transl. A Corner of Dreams). It aired from July 3, 2017, to February 9, 2018, on the network's Afternoon Prime line up replacing Legally Blind.

NUTAM (Nationwide Urban Television Audience Measurement) People in Television Homes ratings are provided by AGB Nielsen Philippines. The series ended, but its the 32nd-week run, and with a total of 160 episodes. It was replaced by The Stepdaughters.

== Series overview ==
Month	Episodes	Monthly averages
Month	Episodes	NUTAM
July 2017	21	6.3%
August 2017	23	7.0%
September 2017	21	6.9%
October 2017	22	6.6%
November 2017	22	6.2%
December 2017	21	6.3%
January 2018	23	6.0%
February 2018	7	6.3%
Total	160	6.5%

== Episodes ==
=== July 2017 ===
Episode		Original Air Date	Social media hashtag	AGB Nielsen NUTAM People		
Episode		Original Air Date	Social media hashtag	Rating	Timeslot Rank	Ref.
1	Nimfa-ngit	July 3, 2017	#Impostora	5.3%	#1	
2	Wanted	July 4, 2017	#ImpostoraWanted	6.1%	#1	
3	Ang Kapalit	July 5, 2017	#ImpostoraAngKapalit	6.2%	#1	
4	Pagsasanay	July 6, 2017	#ImpostoraPagsasanay	5.7%	#1	
5	Unang Pagsubok	July 7, 2017	#ImpostoraUnangPagsubok	6.9%	#1	
6	Homer at Rosette	July 10, 2017	#ImpostoraHomerAtRosette	6.0%	#1	
7	Hinala ni Homer	July 11, 2017	#ImpostoraHinalaNiHomer	6.7%	#1	
8	Crisel in the House	July 12, 2017	#ImpostoraCriselInTheHouse	6.0%	#1	
9	Pagtataka ni Homer	July 13, 2017	#ImpostoraPagtatakaNiHomer	6.4%	#1	
10	Kailangan Lumisan	July 14, 2017	#ImpostoraKailanganLumisan	6.3%	#1	
11	Pagpapaubaya	July 17, 2017	#ImpostoraPagpapaubaya	6.4%	#1	
12	Paninira ni Trina	July 18, 2017	#ImpostoraPaniniraNiTrina	6.2%	#1	
13	Pagsisisi	July 19, 2017	#ImpostoraPagsisisi	6.8%	#1	
14	Caught on Cam	July 20, 2017	#ImpostoraCaughtOnCam	6.8%	#1	
15	I'm Back	July 21, 2017	#ImpostoraImBack	6.3%	#1	
16	Laban o Bawi	July 24, 2017	#ImpostoraLabanOBawi	7.3%	#1	
17	Bad Rosette	July 25, 2017	#ImpostoraBadRosette	6.5%	#1	
18	Sindakan	July 26, 2017	#ImpostoraSindakan	8.0%	#1	
19	Agawan Buhay	July 27, 2017	#ImpostoraAgawanBuhay	8.6%	#1	
20	Salisihan	July 28, 2017	#ImpostoraSalisihan	8.8%	#1	
21	Utakan Pa More	July 31, 2017	#ImpostoraUtakanPaMore	6.2%	#1	

=== August 2017 ===
Episode		Original Air Date	Social media hashtag	AGB Nielsen NUTAM People		
Episode		Original Air Date	Social media hashtag	Rating	Timeslot Rank	Ref.
22	Frame Up	August 1, 2017	#ImpostoraFrameUp	6.1%	#1	
23	Swimsuit Showdown	August 2, 2017	#ImpostoraSwimsuitShowdown	7.3%	#1	
24	Survival Mode	August 3, 2017	#ImpostoraSurvival Mode	6.6%	#1	
25	Buking ni Juliet	August 4, 2017	#ImpostoraBukingNiJuliet	7.3%	#1	
26	Unahan Base	August 7, 2017	#ImpostoraUnahanBase	6.7%	#1	
27	Blood Match	August 8, 2017	#ImpostoraBloodMatch	6.3%	#1	
28	Bagong Hairstyle	August 9, 2017	#ImpostoraBagongHairstyle	6.7%	#1	
29	Pamilya o Puso	August 10, 2017	#ImpostoraPamilyaOPuso	5.7%	#1	
30	Ang Bihag	August 11, 2017	#ImpostoraAngBihag	6.1%	#1	
31	Denang in Trouble	August 14, 2017	#ImpostoraDenangInTrouble	6.5%	#1	
32	Bistado na	August 15, 2017	#ImpostoraBistadoNa	6.1%	#1	
33	Walang Lusot	August 16, 2017	#ImpostoraWalangLusot	6.4%	#1	
34	Pagtugis	August 17, 2017	#ImpostoraPagtugis	6.5%	#1	
35	Rebelasyon	August 18, 2017	#ImpostoraRebelasyon	6.7%	#1	
36	Confirmed	August 21, 2017	#ImpostoraConfirmed	8.6%	#1	
37	Expose	August 22, 2017	#ImpostoraExpose	8.8%	#1	
38	Urong Kaso	August 23, 2017	#ImpostoraUrongKaso	7.8%	#1	
39	Aksidente	August 24, 2017	#ImpostoraAksidente	6.8%	#1	
40	Panunuyo ni Eric	August 25, 2017	#ImpostoraPanunuyoNiEric	8.4%	#1	
41	Homer vs. Eric	August 28, 2017	#ImpostoraHomerVSEric	7.7%	#1	
42	Nawawala si Nimfa	August 29, 2017	#ImpostoraNawawalaSiNimfa	7.6%	#1	
43	Bigo si Eric	August 30, 2017	#ImpostoraBigoSiEric	7.3%	#1	
44	Ganti ni Rosette	August 31, 2017	#ImpostoraGantiNiRosette	7.6%	#1	

=== September 2017 ===
Episode		Original Air Date	Social media hashtag	AGB Nielsen NUTAM		
Episode		Original Air Date	Social media hashtag	Rating	Timeslot Rank	Ref.
45	Paalam, Homer	September 1, 2017	#ImpostoraPaalamHomer	8.6%	#1	
46	Homer in Danger	September 4, 2017	#ImpostoraHomerInDanger	6.4%	#1	
47	Laban, Homer	September 5, 2017	#ImpostoraLabanHomer	7.1%	#1	
48	Tapusin si Homer	September 6, 2017	#ImpostoraTapusinSiHomer	7.2%	#1	
49	Bihag	September 7, 2017	#ImpostoraBihag	6.8%	#1	
50	Balatkayo	September 8, 2017	#ImpostoraBalatkayo	7.0%	#1	
51	Hidden Agenda	September 11, 2017	#ImpostoraHiddenAgenda	7.2%	#1	
52	Laglag si Nimfa	September 12, 2017	#ImpostoraLaglagSiNimfa	8.1%	#1	
53	Wagi si Rosette	September 13, 2017	#ImpostoraWagiSiRosette	7.3%	#1	
54	Pagdukot	September 14, 2017	#ImpostoraPagdukot	7.3%	#1	
55	Paghihiganti	September 15, 2017	#ImpostoraPaghihiganti	6.7%	#1	
56	Rescue	September 18, 2017	#ImpostoraRescue	6.3%	#1	
57	Bihagin si Homer	September 19, 2017	#ImpostoraBihaginSiHomer	—N/a		
58	Torture	September 20, 2017	#ImpostoraTorture	—N/a		
59	Bagong Kabanata	September 21, 2017	#ImpostoraBagongKabanata	7.4%	#1	
60	Lupit ni Rosette	September 22, 2017	#ImpostoraLupitNiRosette	6.5%	#1	
61	Maitim na Balak	September 25, 2017	#ImpostoraMaitimNaBalak	6.6%	#1	
62	Magkakuntsaba	September 26, 2017	#ImpostoraMagkakuntsaba	6.0%	#1	
63	Sindakin	September 27, 2017	#ImpostoraSindakin	5.9%	#1	
64	Terror Attack	September 28, 2017	#ImpostoraTerrorAttack	6.4%	#1	
65	Baliwin si Nimfa	September 29, 2017	#ImpostoraBaliwinSiNimfa	6.1%	#1	

=== October 2017 ===
Episode		Original Air Date	Social media hashtag	AGB Nielsen NUTAM		
Episode		Original Air Date	Social media hashtag	Rating	Timeslot Rank	Ref.
66	Inside Job	October 2, 2017	#ImpostoraInsideJob	5.7%	#1	
67	Espiya ni Rosette	October 3, 2017	#ImpostoraEspiyaNiRosette	6.4%	#1	
68	Halusinasyon	October 4, 2017	#ImpostoraHalusinasyon	5.4%	#1	
69	Backout	October 5, 2017	#ImpostoraBackout	6.0%	#1	
70	Panunuyo	October 6, 2017	#ImpostoraPanunuyo	5.9%	#1	
71	Fake Bride	October 9, 2017	#ImpostoraFakeBride	6.2%	#1	
72	Huwad na Kasal	October 10, 2017	#ImpostoraHuwadNaKasal	6.7%	#1	
73	Maling Nimfa	October 11, 2017	#ImpostoraMalingNimfa	6.8%	#1	
74	Duda ni Denang	October 12, 2017	#ImpostoraDudaNiDenang	6.8%	#1	
75	Resbak ni Denang	October 13, 2017	#ImpostoraResbakNiDenang	7.2%	#1	
76	Bingit ng Kamatayan	October 16, 2017	#ImpostoraBingitNgKamatayan	6.7%	#1	
77	Guilty si Jeremy	October 17, 2017	#ImpostoraGuiltySiJeremy	7.4%	#1	
78	Poot ni Nimfa	October 18, 2017	#ImpostoraPootNiNimfa	6.7%	#1	
79	Sa Piling ng Kaaway	October 19, 2017	#ImpostoraSaPilingNgKaaway	6.4%	#1	
80	Bigong Pagtakas	October 20, 2017	#ImpostoraBigongPagtakas	6.8%	#1	
81	Buking na si Rosette	October 23, 2017	#ImpostoraBukingNaSiRosette	7.4%	#1	
82	Muling Paghaharap	October 24, 2017	#ImpostoraMulingPaghaharap	6.2%	#1	
83	Pagtutuos	October 25, 2017	#ImpostoraPagtutuos	7.0%	#1	
84	Bagong Unos	October 26, 2017	#ImpostoraBagongUnos	7.2%	#1	
85	Wanted Rosette	October 27, 2017	#ImpostoraWantedRosette	7.0%	#1	
86	Buntis si Rosette	October 30, 2017	#ImpostoraBuntisSiRosette	6.6%	#1	
87	Alas ni Rosette	October 31, 2017	#ImpostoraAlasNiRosette	7.4%	#1	

=== November 2017 ===
Episode		Original Air Date	Social media hashtag	AGB Nielsen NUTAM		
Episode		Original Air Date	Social media hashtag	Rating	Timeslot Rank	Ref.
88	Karma	November 1, 2017	#ImpostoraKarma	7.2%	#1	
89	Ang anak ni Homer at Rosette	November 2, 2017	#Impostora	7.4%	#1	
90	Bagong Kakampi	November 3, 2017	#ImpostoraBagongKakampi	7.2%	#1	
91	Ang Kasunduan	November 6, 2017	#ImpostoraAngKasunduan	7.3%	#1	
92	Business	November 7, 2017	#ImpostoraBusiness	6.6%	#1	
93	Maitim na Balak	November 8, 2017	#ImpostoraMaitimNaBalak	5.4%	#1	
94	Panunuyo ni Eric	November 9, 2017	#ImpostoraPanunuyoNiEric	6.2%	#1	
95	Scam	November 10, 2017	#ImpostoraScam	6.6%	#1	
96	Mother Monster	November 13, 2017	#ImpostoraMotherMonster	5.1%	#1	
97	Pag-alala	November 14, 2017	#ImpostoraPagAlala	6.2%	#1	
98	Welcome Home, Rosette	November 15, 2017	#ImpostoraWelcomeHomeRosette	5.5%	#1	
99	Pagtitiis	November 16, 2017	#ImpostoraPagtitiis	5.8%	#1	
100	Bagong Plano	November 17, 2017	#ImpostoraBagongPlano	6.4%	#1	
101	Masamang Tangka	November 20, 2017	#ImpostoraMasamangTangka	5.6%	#1	
102	Homer is Back	November 21, 2017	#ImpostoraHomerIsBack	5.7%	#1	
103	Kampihan	November 22, 2017	#ImpostoraKampihan	5.8%	#1	
104	Mapagsamantala	November 23, 2017	#ImpostoraMapagsamantala	5.4%	#1	
105	Baby Shower	November 24, 2017	#ImpostoraBabyShower	6.5%	#1	
106	Selos	November 27, 2017	#ImpostoraSelos	—N/a		
107	Paglisan	November 28, 2017	#ImpostoraPaglisan	—N/a		
108	Maling Akala	November 29, 2017	#ImpostoraMalingAkala	—N/a		
109	Ransom	November 30, 2017	#ImpostoraRansom	—N/a		

=== December 2017 ===
Episode		Original Air Date	Social media hashtag	AGB Nielsen NUTAM		
Episode		Original Air Date	Social media hashtag	Rating	Timeslot Rank	Ref.
110	Rescue	December 1, 2017	#ImpostoraRescue	6.2%	#1	
111	Sabong	December 4, 2017	#ImpostoraSabong	6.6%	#1	
112	Bingit ng Kamatayan	December 5, 2017	#ImpostoraBingitNgKamatayan	6.0%	#1	
113	Second Life	December 6, 2017	#ImpostoraSecondLife	6.7%	#1	
114	Wanted Eric	December 7, 2017	#ImpostoraWantedEric	6.9%	#1	
115	Dalamhati	December 8, 2017	#ImpostoraDalamhati	7.5%	#1	
116	Pusong Ina	December 11, 2017	#ImpostoraPusongIna	5.8%	#1	
117	Paghihiganti	December 12, 2017	#ImpostoraPaghihiganti	6.0%	#1	
118	Kidnap	December 13, 2017	#ImpostoraKidnap	5.8%	#1	
119	Bagong Baby	December 14, 2017	#ImpostoraBagongBaby	6.1%	#1	
120	Evil Plan	December 15, 2017	#ImpostoraEvilPlan	6.0%	#1	
121	Iresponsableng Ina	December 18, 2017	#ImpostoraIresponsablengIna	6.8%	#1	
122	Nursing101	December 19, 2017	#ImpostoraNursing101	6.1%	#1	
123	Walang Kawala	December 20, 2017	#ImpostoraWalangKawala	6.3%	#1	
124	Resbak	December 21, 2017	#ImpostoraResbak	6.4%	#1	
125	Masamang pangitain	December 22, 2017	#ImpostoraMasamangPangitain	6.9%	#1	
126	Walang Katapusang Paghihiganti	December 25, 2017	#Impostora	4.5%	#1	
127	Dalamhati	December 26, 2017	#ImpostoraDalamhati	5.7%	#1	
128	Rosette Panget	December 27, 2017	#ImpostoraRosettePanget	6.7%	#1	
129	Pag-espiya	December 28, 2017	#ImpostoraPagEspiya	6.9%	#1	
130	Hostage	December 29, 2017	#ImpostoraHostage	6.5%	#1	

=== January 2018 ===
Episode		Original Air Date	Social media hashtag	AGB Nielsen NUTAM		
Episode		Original Air Date	Social media hashtag	Rating	Timeslot Rank	Ref.
131	Takas	January 1, 2018	#ImpostoraTakas	6.0%	#1	
132	Paniningil	January 2, 2018	#ImpostoraPaniningil	6.5%	#1	
133	Goodbye, Rosette	January 3, 2018	#ImpostoraGoodbyeRosette	6.2%	#1	
134	Bagong Anghel	January 4, 2018	#ImpostoraBagongAnghel	7.1%	#1	
135	Bagong Panganib	January 5, 2018	#ImpostoraBagongPanganib	6.2%	#1	
136	Rafaela	January 8, 2018	#ImpostoraRafaela	6.1%	#1	
137	Kutob	January 9, 2018	#ImpostoraKutob	5.5%	#1	
138	Tamang Hinala	January 10, 2018	#ImpostoraTamangHinala	6.1%	#1	
139	Imbestigasyon	January 11, 2018	#ImpostoraImbestigasyon	5.9%	#1	
140	Kumpirmasyon	January 12, 2018	#ImpostoraKumpirmasyon	6.1%	#1	
141	Secret Revealed	January 15, 2018	#ImpostoraSecretRevealed	6.2%	#1	
142	Kutob ni Trina	January 16, 2018	#ImpostoraKutobNiTrina	5.9%	#1	
143	Balatkayo	January 17, 2018	#ImpostoraBalatkayo	5.6%	#1	
144	Kill Nimfa	January 18, 2018	#ImpostoraKillNimfa	6.0%	#1	
145	Paalam, Homer	January 19, 2018	#ImpostoraPaalamHomer	6.1%	#1	
146	Biyaya	January 22, 2018	#ImpostoraBiyaya	5.9%	#1	
147	Alexa Olivia	January 23, 2018	#ImpostoraAlexaOlivia	4.9%	#1	
148	Baby for Sale	January 24, 2018	#ImpostoraBabyForSale	5.9%	#1	
149	Lukso ng Dugo	January 25, 2018	#ImpostoraLuksoNgDugo	5.9%	#1	
150	Salisi	January 26, 2018	#ImpostoraSalisi	5.6%	#1	
151	Operation Hunting	January 29, 2018	#ImpostoraOperationHunting	5.8%	#1	
152	Anak mo, Anak ko	January 30, 2018	#ImpostoraAnakMoAnakKo	5.4%	#1	
153	Suhol	January 31, 2018	#ImpostoraSuhol	6.3%	#1	

=== February 2018 ===
Episode		Original Air Date	Social media hashtag	AGB Nielsen NUTAM		
Episode		Original Air Date	Social media hashtag	Rating	Timeslot Rank	Ref.
154	Buking	February 1, 2018	#ImpostoraBuking	6.0%	#1	
155	Pain	February 2, 2018	#ImpostoraPain	6.5%	#1	
156	Sukdulang Kasamaan	February 5, 2018	#ImpostoraSukdulangKasamaan	5.9%	#1	
157	The Big Reveal	February 6, 2018	#ImpostoraTheBigReveal	6.1%	#1	
158	Kamatayan (Death)	February 7, 2018	#ImpostoraKamatayan	6.2%	#1	
159	Final Face Off	February 8, 2018	#ImpostoraFinalFaceOff	6.3%	#1	
160	Ang Pagtatapos	February 9, 2018	#ImpostoraAngPagtatapos	7.4%	#1	
