= P. B. Abercrombie =

British writer (1917–2003)

Patricia Abercrombie Barnes
- Born: Patricia Abercrombie; 20 July 1917; Hambledon, Surrey
- Died: 7 May 2003 (aged 85); Tenterden, Kent
- Occupation: Writer
- Spouse: Sir Denis Barnes
- Writing career
- Pen name: P. B. Abercrombie

Patricia Abercrombie Barnes (20 July 1917 – 7 May 2003), better known by the pen name P. B. Abercrombie, was a British writer.

== Biography ==
Patricia Abercrombie was born on 20 July 1917 in Hambledon, Surrey. Her father, Charles Murray Abercrombie, was a stockbroker who was serving in the British Army on the Western Front at the time of her birth. Her father came from a large family and among her uncles were the writer Lascelles Abercrombie and the town planner Patrick Abercrombie. Her mother died when she was 15 and her father two years later. She learned shorthand and typing and, at the age on nineteen, moved to London, where she married Denis Charles Barnes, a civil servant, in 1938. He was also an industrial relations expert, and wrote books.

Denis Barnes became the Permanent Secretary of the Ministry of Labour in 1966 and was knighted in 1967. He died on 6 May 1991. She died on 7 May 2003 in Tenterden. She and her husband are buried in Wittersham in Kent.

== Works ==
She began writing short stories on lunch breaks while working at the Ministry of Labour during World War Two. Her first novel, The Rescuers, was published in 1952. Reviewing it in the Daily Telegraph, John Betjeman wrote, "It abounds with subtle observation of psychological nuances, with illuminating remarks on human behaviour," and Marghanita Laski said that "It is written with delicacy and intelligence." Following the publication of her third novel, Victor and the Vanquished, Angus Wilson wrote that "Miss Abercrombie is, in my opinion, the most interesting of our young novelists."

Her most critically and commercially successful novel was A Little Difference, a comedy involving an adulterous teacher in an eccentric all-girls school. The Tatler's reviewer found it "As enjoyable as a glass of champagne in the middle of a sunny morning when you ought to be working." Infidelity played a role in her fifth novel, Fido Couchant, about the comic but rocky progress of two marriages. Her sixth novel, Pity, centered on a child kidnapping. The Times' reviewer found that "Miss Abercrombie gets some good touches but her setting and style are not always convincing." Her last book, The Brou Ha-Ha, was an epistolary novel and returned to a comic theme, but by the time of its publication in 1972, one writer had already asked, "Whatever happened to P. B. Abercrombie....?" She appears to have stopped writing after The Brou Ha-Ha.

== Novels ==
- The Rescuers, 1952
- A Lease on Life, 1953
- Victor and the Vanquished, 1956
- The Child of Fortune, 1957
- A Little Difference, 1959
- Fido Couchant (published in the U. S. as The Grasshopper Heart), 1961
- Pity, 1965
- The Brou Ha-Ha, 1972 (published in German as Das grosse Brou Ha Ha, translation by Anne Uhde, 1973)
