= Blue Incantation =

Studio album by Sanjay Mishra
- Released: 1995
- Length: 47:05
- Label: Akar
- Producer: Sanjay Mishra

Sanjay Mishra chronology
| The Crossing (1991) | Blue Incantation (1995) | Port Djema (1997) |

Blue Incantation is an album by guitarist Sanjay Mishra with special guest Jerry Garcia. It combines elements of modern Western music and classical Indian music. It was released in 1995 by Akar Music and RainDog Records.

== Critical reception ==
Professional ratings
Review scores
| Source | Rating |
|---|---|
| Allmusic | 4.5/5 stars |
| The Music Box | 4/5 stars |

The Denver Post wrote of the album, "Sanjay Mishra plays acoustic guitar with an eclecticism well suited for his multicultural background.... [The] selections [with Garcia] are lovely and expansive."

AllMusic's review said, "But the Garcia connection aside, this disc is worth a listen on the strength of Mishra's nimble guitar work and smooth compositions alone.... A gorgeous record that updates the rich traditions of Indian Classical music by placing them in a modern context."

The Music Box wrote, "Blue Incantation is an exceptional collection of instrumental pieces from guitarist Sanjay Mishra, and its success goes far beyond the assistance he received from Jerry Garcia.... [Mishra] is more than just technically competent, too. Throughout Blue Incantation, he brandishes a range of emotions and feelings that are difficult for many guitarists to capture."

Rolling Stone India said, "If Garcia's playing style too is reminiscent essentially of his Grateful Dead oeuvre, the musical backdrop is a studied and meditative acoustic flowering of Mishra's varied jazz, Spanish and classical influences. Samir Chatterjee on the tabla brings up a distinctly Indian rhythmic mood to the album."

== Front Street Outtakes ==
Front Street Outtakes is a three-song, 15-minute collection of outtakes from the Blue Incantation recording sessions. It was released for streaming and as a digital download on January 5, 2021.

== Track listing ==
All compositions by Sanjay Mishra, except "Bach in Time" written by J.S. Bach and arranged by Mishra

1. "My Meditation" – 4:03
2. "Monsoon" – 2:57
3. "For Julia" – 6:21
4. "Allegro" – 4:07
5. "Clouds" – 7:31
6. "Passage into Dawn" – 7:21
7. "Self Portrait" – 2:27
8. "Bach in Time" – 4:09
9. "Nocturne / Evening Chant" – 4:07
10. "Before Summer Rain" – 3:31

== Personnel ==
Musicians

- Sanjay Mishra – acoustic guitar
- Jerry Garcia – electric guitar on tracks 2, 5, 9
- Samir Chatterjee – tabla, percussion on all tracks except 7 and 10
- John Wubbenhorst – bansuri on tracks 9, 10
- George Thomas – bass on track 5
- Steve Zerlin – bass on tracks 2, 4, 8

Production

- Produced by Sanjay Mishra
- Engineers: Jim Robeson, Heidi Gerber, John Cutler, Jeffrey Norman, Miti
- Mixing: Miti, Fred Derby
- Mastering: David Glasser
- Design: Mark Daniels
- Photos: Mike Johnsen, George Thomas, Mark Daniels, Jonathan Hall, Sanjay Mishra
