= Rescue (Sanjay Mishra album) =

Studio album by Sanjay Mishra
- Released: 2000
- Label: Akar
- Producer: Sanjay Mishra

Sanjay Mishra chronology
Port Djema (1997)	Rescue (2000)	Chateau Benares (2006)

Rescue is an album by the guitarist Sanjay Mishra. It was released in 2000.

== Track listing ==
1. "Rescue" (Sanjay Mishra) – 4:13
2. "Crossover" (Mishra) – 5:43
3. "Firefly" (Mishra) – 5:02
4. "Stoneflower Morning" (Miti) – 5:17
5. "Norwegian Wood" (John Lennon, Paul McCartney) – 4:18
6. "Kaliedescope" (Mishra) – 7:40
7. "Purnima" (Mishra) – 3:02
8. "The Eighth" (Mishra) – 4:52
9. "Gymnopedie" (Eric Satie) – 3:25

== Personnel ==
=== Musicians ===
- Sanjay Mishra – guitar and programming
- Dennis Chambers – drums
- Samir Chatterjee – tabla
- Bill Kratz – bass
- Ramesh Mishra – sarangi
- John Gnorski – dobro on "Purnima"
- Broto Roy – frame drum on "Kaleidoscope"

=== Production ===
- Miti – engineer
