= Jewish World Watch =

Anti-genocide international non-profit

- Founded: August 16, 2005; 20 years ago
- Founders: Harold M. Schulweis and Janice Kamenir-Reznik
- Tax ID no.: 20-3406211
- Legal status: 501(c)(3) nonprofit organization NGO
- Headquarters: Encino, California, United States
- Director of Advocacy and Programs: Ann Strimov Durbin
- Revenue: $1,202,369 (2017)
- Expenses: $1,353,217 (2017)
- Employees: 7 (2019)
- Volunteers: 150 (2019)
- Website: www.jww.org

Jewish World Watch (JWW) is a non-profit humanitarian organization dedicated to helping survivors of genocide and mass atrocities around the world.

== History ==
Rabbi Harold M. Schulweis and Janice Kamenir-Reznik established Jewish World Watch (JWW) in 2004 on the principle of Tikkun Olam (repairing the world). The organization was founded after learning of the genocide occurring in Darfur, Sudan, and recalling the Holocaust, and the 1994 Rwandan genocide. Since its founding, JWW has grown from a collection of Southern California synagogues to include support from schools, churches, and partner organizations across the country.

In March 2010, JWW became a member of the Eastern Congo Initiative founded by Ben Affleck. In 2016, Susan Freudenheim, former executive editor at the Jewish Journal, became the executive director. In 2020, Serena Oberstein was named as executive director.

Since their inception, they have donated over $6 million in humanitarian assistance to the people of Sudan and Congo.

JWW is primarily focused on the conflicts in the Democratic Republic of the Congo, Myanmar, Sudan, South Sudan, and Syria.

== Walk to End Genocide ==
Jewish World Watch hosts an annual fundraising walk called the Walk to End Genocide. In 2019, the Walk took place in two locations, Los Angeles (March 31) and the Conejo Valley (April 7).
