= Stephanie Nyombayire =

Rwandan activist

Director General of Communication, Office of the President of Rwanda

Personal details
- Born: December 1986 (age 39)
- Education: Kent School; Swarthmore College
- Occupation: activist

Stephanie Nyombayire (born December 1986) is a Rwandan activist and public official. She is the director general of communication in Office of the President of Rwanda and a representative for the Genocide Intervention Network.

== Biography ==
Nyombayire was born in 1986. She graduated from Kent School in Kent, Connecticut in 2004 and Swarthmore College in Swarthmore, Pennsylvania in June 2008.

She lost dozens of her family members in the Genocide against the Tutsi in 1994, although she herself was not in the country at the time. As a result, she felt particularly attuned to situations of genocide, and in 2004, joined with Mark Hanis and Andrew Sniderman to form the Genocide Intervention Network to advocate for intervention in the Darfur conflict in Sudan.

MTVUniversity chose Nyombayire as one of three students to report on the atrocities in Darfur. Denied entry into Sudan, she traveled to Chad and met with refugees in an effort to show the world the atrocities. She was accompanied by Nate Wright and Andrew Karlsruher, with a small film production crew from MTV who produced the telefilm Translating Genocide. The documentary aired on March 12, 2006. On April 6, 2005, Nyombayire gave a speech at the Hart Senate Office Building attended by members of Congress in an effort to get the Bush administration to take decisive action to end the genocide. On September 25, 2006, the Darfur Peace and Accountability Act passed the House.

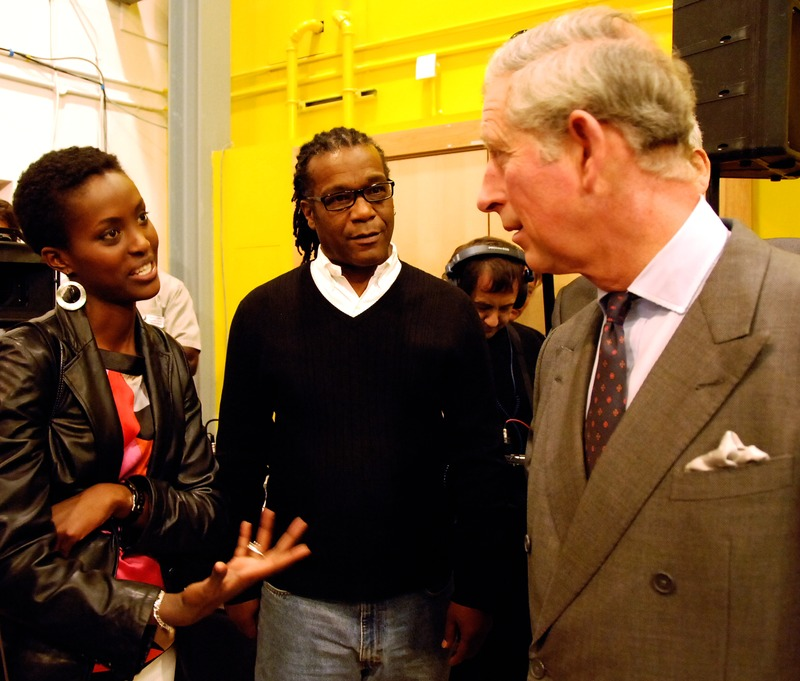
Nyombayire (left) with Michael W. King and Charles, Prince of Wales in 2011

Nyombayire gave the introduction for U.S. President Bill Clinton at the Genocide Intervention Network's July 13, 2005 Campus Progress student conference where Clinton offered an apology for the world's inaction during the Rwandan genocide.

In 2007, Stephanie was named one of Glamour magazine's Top Ten College Women for her work on Darfur. Stephanie was honored by Rwandan First Lady Jeannette Kagame for her role in founding the Genocide Intervention Network, and in 2008 was invited to speak on a Clinton Global Initiative panel on student activism.

== News Coverage ==
- "Telling the stories of Sudan's horror," Delaware County Times, March 20, 2005
- "Students take action to aid Sudan," The Philadelphia Inquirer, April 11, 2005
- "Rwandan teen, excelling in U.S., now lobbies for Darfur aid," Associated Press, June 14, 2005
- "Learning from the tragedy of the past," The Dallas Morning News, July 2, 2005
- "A student, 16, confronts the unthinkable," The Philadelphia Inquirer, June 14, 2006
- "Glamour Hero: She lost 100 family members to genocide," Glamour magazine, March 1, 2007
- "Rwandan Native Stephanie Nyombayire will not Sleep Until the World Wakes Up," ObaaSema Magazine, April 15, 2007
- "Stephanie Nyombayire '08 Honored by Rwanda's First Lady," Swarthmore College News
- "Vanguard Peace Warrior," Newsweek, April 20, 2008
