= Rescuers: Portraits of Moral Courage in the Holocaust =

1992 book by Gay Block and Malka Drucker

- Author: Gay Block, Malka Drucker
- Language: English
- Published: Radius Books
- Publication date: 1992
- ISBN: 9780841913226

Rescuers: Portraits of Moral Courage in the Holocaust is a 1992 book by Gay Block and Malka Drucker.

In 1986, rabbis Harold Schulweis, Malka Drucker and portrait artist Gay Block decided to document the activities of non-Jewish Europeans who risked torture and death to save Jews during the Holocaust, a topic they considered both important and under-publicized. Their work would eventually lead to a book (Rescuers: Portraits of Moral Courage in the Holocaust), as well as an exhibition of Block's photographs.
