= The Rescue =

The Rescue may refer to:

== Art ==
- The Rescue (painting), 1855, by John Everett Millais
- The Rescue (sculpture), a marble sculpture group (1837–50) by Horatio Greenough

== Film ==
- The Rescue (1917 film), a silent drama starring Lon Chaney, Sr.
- The Rescue (1929 film), a romantic adventure by Herbert Brenon, based on Joseph Conrad's novel (see below)
- The Rescue, a 1971 Shaw Brothers film
- The Rescue (1988 film), directed by Ferdinand Fairfax
- Free Willy 3: The Rescue, a 1997 American family film
- The Rescue (2020 film), a Chinese action film directed by Dante Lam
- The Rescue (2021 film), an American-British documentary
- The Rescue (2027 film), an upcoming American western

== Television ==
- "Chapter 16: The Rescue", an episode of The Mandalorian
- "The Rescue", Air America episode 18 (1999)
- "The Rescue", Bonanza season 2, episode 23 (1961)
- "The Rescue", Broken Arrow season 1, episode 14 (1957)
- "The Rescue", Comedy Playhouse series 13, episode 2 (1973)
- "The Rescue", Crossing Lines season 2, episode 1 (2014)
- "The Rescue", Dangwa episode 30 (2015)
- "The Rescue", Doctor Who season 1, episode 11; episode 7 of The Daleks (1964)
- "The Rescue" (Doctor Who), a two-episode serial of Doctor Who (1965)
- "The Rescue" (Dynasty 1984), an episode of Dynasty
- "The Rescue" (Dynasty 1986), an episode of Dynasty
- "The Rescue", Emerald Point N.A.S. season 1, episode 12 (1983)
- "The Rescue", Fast & Furious Spy Racers season 5, episode 2 (2021)
- "The Rescue", Grace and Frankie season 6, episode 2 (2020)
- "The Rescue", Huckleberry Finn and His Friends episode 25 (1980)
- "The Rescue", Intelligence episode 5 (2014)
- "The Rescue", Kipper series 3, episode 2 (1999)
- "The Rescue", Kodiak episode 13 (1974)
- "The Rescue", Lassie (1954) season 7, episode 4 (1960)
- "The Rescue", Mentors season 1, episode 13 (1999)
- "The Rescue", Power Rangers Super Samurai episode 5 (2012)
- "The Rescue", Saber Rider and the Star Sheriffs episode 46 (1988)
- "The Rescue", Samurai 7 episode 21 (2004)
- "The Rescue", Sea Princesses season 1, episode 23 (2009)
- "The Rescue", Seven Brides for Seven Brothers episode 18 (1983)
- "The Rescue", Telephone Time season 3, episode 12 (1957)
- "The Rescue", The Adventures of Gulliver episode 11 (1966)
- "The Rescue", The Adventures of Sinbad season 1, episode 15 (1997)
- "The Rescue", The Lazarus Man episode 14 (1996)
- "The Rescue", The Legend of Prince Valiant season 2, episode 15 (1993)
- "The Rescue" (The O.C.), an episode of The O.C.
- "The Rescue", The Wind in the Willows series 2, episode 3 (1986)
- "The Rescue", V: The Series episode 13 (1985)
- "The Rescue", Waterfront season 2, episode 26 (1955)
- "The Rescue", Widows' Web episode 38 (2022)
- "The Rescue", Wizards and Warriors episode 3 (1983)
- "The Rescue", Yu-Gi-Oh! Duel Monsters season 2, episode 25 (2001)
- "The Rescue", Pocoyo season 4, episode 43 (2020)

== Literature ==
- The Rescue, a 1902 novel by Anne Douglas Sedgwick
- The Rescue (Conrad novel), 1920, by Joseph Conrad
- The Rescue, a 1983 children's book by Edna O'Brien
- Doctor Who - The Rescue, a 1987 novelization of the 1965 serial by Ian Marter
- The Rescue, a 1998 novel by Suzanne Robinson
- The Rescue, a 2000 novel by Don Ellis, based on the sci-fi miniature wargame VOR: The Maelstrom
- The Rescue (Sparks novel), 2000, by Nicholas Sparks
- The Rescue, a 2002 novel by Lori Wick; the second entry in the English Garden series
- The Rescue, a 2003 novel by William W. Johnstone
- Guardians of Ga'Hoole: The Rescue, a 2004 novel by Kathryn Lasky
- The Rescue, a 2006 novel by Gordon Korman
- The Rescue, a 2011 manga novel based on the Warriors novel series by Erin Hunter

== Music ==
- The Rescue (Adam Cappa album)
- The Rescue (Explosions in the Sky album)
- The Rescue (Horsell Common album)
- "The Rescue", a song by American Hi-Fi from the soundtrack album Sound of Superman
- "The Rescue", a song by Kutless from To Know That You're Alive

== See also ==
- The Rescues, an American rock band
- The Rescuers (disambiguation)
- Rescue (disambiguation)
