= Gay Block =

American photographer (born 1942)

- Born: 1942 (age 83–84); Houston, Texas
- Spouse: Billie Parker

Gay Block (born 1942) is a fine art portrait photographer, who was born in Houston, Texas. Her work has been published in books, and is collected by the Museum of Modern Art, the San Francisco Museum of Modern Art, the Museum of Fine Arts, Houston, the El Paso Museum of Art, the Jewish Museum (Manhattan) and the New Mexico Museum of Art.

== Biography ==
Block had been interested in photography since she was a pre-teen, when she started taking pictures of her friends and family using a Brownie box camera. She recalls that she enjoyed taking candid photos and collaborating with her subjects.

By the 1970s she began taking pictures of members of her own affluent Jewish community in Houston. She later photographed an older Jewish community of retirees in South Miami Beach, many of whom were Holocaust survivors. Block also photographed girls at summer camp. In 2006, Block re-photographed women who were the girls in her 1981 series from Camp Pinecliffe, twenty-five years earlier.

Block collaborated with author and rabbi Malka Drucker to create Rescuers: Portraits of Moral Courage in the Holocaust, both a book and traveling exhibit. Block and Drucker traveled to eleven countries and photographed over 100 Christians who had helped rescue Jews during the Holocaust. The exhibit has been seen in over fifty venues in the US and abroad, including the Museum of Modern Art, NY, in 1992.

In 2003, Block's 30-year series of portraits of her mother, in photographs, video, and words, Bertha Alyce: Mother exPosed, was published by University of New Mexico Press and continues as a traveling exhibit. The book, Bertha Alyce, was cited as one of "Twelve Great Books Published During The Year 2003" by the editors of RALPH (The Review of Arts, Literature, Politics, and the Humanities). Her video of the material, "Bertha Alyce", was awarded People's Choice and Best Documentary by the Madrid International Gay & Lesbian Film Festival, Spain. The photographs of Bertha Alyce are not considered a conventional representation of a mother/daughter relationship; instead Block's relationship with her mother is unique. Block's documentary technique is considered by the critic to be "assured, if reminiscent of Duane Michaels or Nan Goldin."

== Rescuers of the Holocaust ==
In 1986, Rabbi Harold Schulweis, author Malka Drucker and Gay Block decided to document activities of non-Jewish Europeans who risked torture and death to save Jews during the Holocaust, a topic they considered both important and under-publicized. Their work would eventually led to a book (Rescuers: Portraits of Moral Courage in the Holocaust), as well as an exhibition of Block's, named Gay Block: Rescuers of the Holocaust travelled to numerous museums, including the Museum of Modern Art, New York, Corcoran Gallery of Art, Washington, DC, Museum of Fine Arts, Houston, TX, University of New Mexico Art Museum, Albuquerque, NM, Houston Center for Photography, Houston, TX.
