= Debórah Dwork =

American historian

Debórah Dwork is an American historian, specializing in the history of the Holocaust. She is the Founding Director of the Center for the Study of the Holocaust, Genocide, and Crimes Against Humanity at the Graduate Center—City University of New York. She was formerly the Founding Director of the Strassler Center for Holocaust and Genocide Studies and served as the Rose Professor of Holocaust History at Clark University in Worcester, Massachusetts. Dwork is credited with helping to establish the first doctoral program dedicated exclusively to Holocaust History and Genocide Studies through the Strassler Center for Holocaust and Genocide Studies at Clark University. Her work contributed to the institutionalization of Holocaust and genocide studies as a distinct academic field. Dwork's scholarship has been noted for expanding Holocaust historiography beyond political and military history to include childhood, family life, welfare, gender, and individual agency. Her work helped shape subsequent scholarship on the social history of genocide. Dwork is the recipient of the Distinguished Achievement Award in Holocaust Studies from the Holocaust Educational Foundation in 2024; the Annetje Fels-Kupferschmidt Award bestowed by the Dutch Auschwitz Committee in 2022; and the International Network of Genocide Scholars Lifetime Achievement Award in 2020.

== Education and career ==
Dwork earned a B.A. from Princeton University in 1975, an M.P.H. from Yale University in 1978, and a Ph.D. from University College London in 1984. After a postdoctoral fellowship at the Smithsonian Institution, she joined the faculty of the University of Michigan in 1984, and moved to the Yale Child Study Center at Yale University in 1989. She took the position as Rose Professor at Clark University in 1996. She has held fellowships from (inter alia) the Guggenheim Foundation, the American Council of Learned Societies, and the Woodrow Wilson International Center for Scholars, and has served as the Shapiro Senior Scholar-in-Residence at the United States Holocaust Memorial Museum and as a visiting scholar at Rutgers University. Dwork has served on the United States delegation to the 34-member International Holocaust Remembrance Alliance (IHRA).

== Academic work ==
Dwork's early scholarship established her as a social historian who pioneered the use of oral history and primary documents as complementary sources. A scholar of Public Health, she published a study of immigrant Jews in New York in the period 1880–1914. At the same time, she began to focus on the history of childhood. In her first book, War is Good for Babies and Other Young Children (1987), Dwork examined questions about the family, the role of women, and the concept of children's rights in the context of the development of the modern welfare system.

Dwork moved from the history of childhood as a social construct to the history of children as subjects and actors. Her new child-centered approach used children's experiences as a lens through which to view all of society. In Children With A Star (1991), she presented the daily lives of young people caught in the net of Nazism. A wholly original theoretical development, Dwork's child-centered history opened a new area of historical investigation. Children With A Star was also a pioneer work in the use of oral histories, conducted and recorded by Dwork. The book became the subject of a documentary of the same name by the Canadian Broadcasting Corporation.

Auschwitz, 1270 to the Present (1996), co-authored with Robert Jan van Pelt, demonstrated the connection between industrial killing and the daily functions of a society that believed it was involved in constructive activity. Dwork and van Pelt used architectural evidence to understand Auschwitz. The book received the National Jewish Book Award and the Spiro Kostof Award. It was also the basis for the Horizon/Nova television documentary “Blueprints of Genocide” (BBC)/ “Nazi Designers of Death” (PBS).

Dwork and van Pelt also collaborated on Holocaust: A History, which discusses the place of the Holocaust in the history of Europe, from the Middle Ages to the middle of the twentieth century. It explores how the different occupation regimes shaped the local populations' ability to respond to the genocide enacted outside their windows. And it integrates, for the first time, the history of World War II and the history of the Holocaust, and weaves together the distinct narrative lines of perpetrators and of the victims; the Nazis’ push towards a “Final Solution,” and the Jews’ reactions and responses.

In Flight from the Reich (2009), Dwork and van Pelt turned their attention to the question of refugee Jews from 1933 through the postwar period. Flight locates the history of refugee Jews within the context of the Holocaust and deals with Jews fleeing from countries across Europe to countries all over the world. The book shows that fleeing did not write refugees out of the story; it simply takes the story elsewhere.

Dwork edited and annotated The Terezin Album of Marianka Zadikow (2008), a poesie album collected by a Jewish inmate as the Germans pushed forward with deportations from Theresienstadt. In A Boy in Terezin: The Private Diary of Pavel Weiner, April 1944 – April 1945 (2011), she returned to the experiences of children as an important source for contemporaneous accounts of Jewish life under Nazi persecution. In 2020, the volume Agency and the Holocaust: Essays in Honor of Debórah Dwork was published, bringing together scholarship inspired by themes central to her work on Holocaust history and human agency.

Dwork's most recent book, Saints and Liars (2025) tells the story of American aid workers who undertook rescue efforts abroad during the Nazi era. Analyzing their experiences, Dwork foregrounds the role of unpredictable and irrational factors on the ground, at a particular moment, in shaping individual fates. Her 2025 book Saints and Liars: The Story of Americans Who Saved Refugees from the Nazis was selected by Library Journal as a Stellar Book of 2025. It was also a nonfiction finalist by the National Jewish Book Award.

== Personal life ==
Dwork is the daughter of mathematician Bernard Dwork, and sister of computer scientist Cynthia Dwork and neuropathologist Andrew Dwork.

== Film Credits ==
Dwork has served as the historian of record on and off film in feature-length and TV documentaries. These include director Rick Trank's "Against the Tide" (2008) and "Unlikely Heroes" (2003), the Ken Burns/Artemis Joukowsky documentary, "Defying the Nazis" (2016), and “Misha and the Wolves” directed by Sam Hobkinson (2021).

Television documentaries include "Hiding in Plain Sight" (CBS, 2009), "Misha Defonseca and her Hoax Memoir" (RTBF, Belgian National TV, 2008), and “Les enfants de Terezin et le monstre á moustache” (The Children of Terezin and the Monster with Moustaches) directed by Henriette Chardak (France Channel 5 and the parliamentary channel, LCP, 2019).

== Bibliography ==
- Dwork, Debórah (2025). Saints and Liars: The Story of Americans Who Saved Refugees from the Nazis. New York: W.W. Norton. ISBN 978-1-3240-2034-9
- Dwork, Debórah (2012). A Boy in Terezin: The Private Diary of Pavel Weiner, April 1944 – April 1945. Evanston: Northwestern University Press. ISBN 978-0-8101-2779-1.
- Dwork, Debórah; van Pelt, Robert Jan (2009). Flight from the Reich: Refugee Jews, 1933–1946. New York: W.W. Norton. ISBN 978-0-393-06229-8. Translations: Dutch (Elmar); French (Calmann-Lévy).
- Dwork, Debórah (2008). The Terezin Album of Marianka Zadikow. Chicago: University of Chicago Press. ISBN 978-0-226-51186-3.
- Dwork, Debórah; van Pelt, Robert Jan (2008). Auschwitz. New York: W.W. Norton & Co. ISBN 978-0-393-32291-0. First published as: Auschwitz 1270 to the Present. New York: Norton. ISBN 0-393-03933-1. Translations: Czech (Argo); Dutch (Boom); German (Pendo); Polish (Swiat Ksiazki).
- Dwork, Debórah; van Pelt, Robert Jan (2002). Holocaust: A History. New York: Norton. ISBN 0-393-05188-9. Translations: Dutch (Boom); Portuguese (Imago); Spanish (EDAF).
- Dwork, Debórah (2002). Voices and Views: A History of the Holocaust. New York: Jewish Foundation for the Righteous. ISBN 0-9700602-0-3.
- Dwork, Debórah (1991). Children With A Star: Jewish Youth in Nazi Europe. New Haven: Yale University Press. ISBN 0-300-05054-2. Translations: Dutch (Boom); German (Beck); Italian (Marsilio); Japanese (Sogen Sha).
- Dwork, Debórah (1987). War Is Good for Babies and Other Young Children: A History of the Infant and Child Welfare Movement in England 1898–1918. London; New York: Tavistock Publications. ISBN 0-422-60660-X.
