= Malka Drucker =

American writer

Malka Drucker (born March 14, 1945) is an American rabbi and author living in Santa Barbara, California.

== Overview ==
Ordained in 1998 from the Academy for Jewish Religion, a transdenominational seminary, Drucker is the founding rabbi of HaMakom: The Place for Passionate and Progressive Judaism, in Santa Fe, and served for fifteen years. She retired as spiritual leader of Temple Har Shalom in Idyllwild, California, in 2021.

Malka Drucker is married to Dr Sheila Namir, a psychologist.

Drucker is the author of 21 books including the award-winning Frida Kahlo, Rescuers: Portraits of Moral Courage in the Holocaust, Grandma's Latkes and The Family Treasury of Jewish Holidays. Her highly acclaimed Jewish Holiday Series won the Southern California Council on Literature for Children Prize series. Eliezer Ben Yehuda: Father of Modern Hebrew won the ADL (Anti-Defamation League) Janusz Korczak Literary Competition and her biography of Frida Kahlo was chosen as an American Booksellers Association "Pick of the Lists." Drucker's collaboration with photographer Gay Block, White Fire: A Portrait of Women Spiritual Leaders in America, received the 2005 Southwest PEN award for non fiction. Portraits of Jewish American Heroes published August 2008 won the New Mexico Children's Book Prize. In 2009 the collection of essays Women and Judaism, edited by Malka Drucker, was published by Praeger Books. With Rabbi Nadya Gross, she has written "Embracing Wisdom: Soaring in the Second Half of Life.

In 1986, rabbi Harold Schulweis, Malka Drucker and Gay Block decided to document activities of non-Jewish Europeans who risked torture and death to save Jews during the Holocaust, a topic they considered both important and under-publicized. Their work would eventually led to a book by Drucker (Rescuers: Portraits of Moral Courage in the Holocaust), as well as an exhibition of Block's photographs.

A 2013 dissertation from the University of New Mexico's department of anthropology, "Storied Lives in a Living Tradition: Women Rabbis and Jewish Community in 21st Century New Mexico", by Miria Kano, discusses Drucker and four other female rabbis of New Mexico.
