= Charm City Bluegrass Festival =

Bluegrass festival in Baltimore, US

Coordinates: 39°19′23″N 76°38′41″W

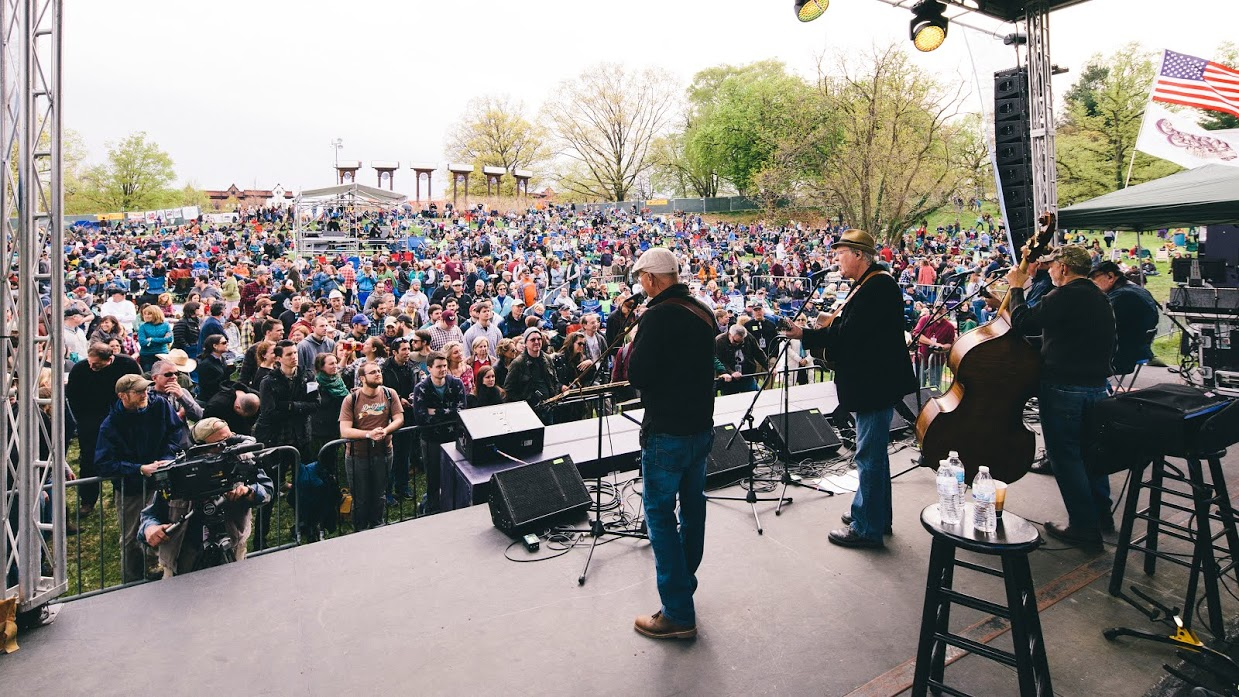
- Charm City Bluegrass Festival 2015
- Genre: Bluegrass music
- Location: Baltimore, Maryland
- Years active: 2013–19, 2022–
- Founders: Jordan August and Phil Chorney
- Website: charmcitybluegrass.com

The Charm City Bluegrass Festival is a bluegrass festival established in 2013 and taking place each April in Baltimore, Maryland, United States. It features local, regional, and national musicians. The festival maintains strong ties with the local community, and seeks to highlight the long, distinguished history of bluegrass music in Baltimore.

== History ==
The event was founded in 2013 as the Charm City Folk & Bluegrass Festival. Jordan August and Phil Chorney, partners in the Baltimore Music Agency, wished to "put on bluegrass for everyone to see, whether it was on the porch, at a show, or a bigger party," as a way to highlight Baltimore's rich history of bluegrass music. Its name was shortened to the Charm City Bluegrass Festival in 2017. The inaugural festival was a sold-out event held on the grounds of the Union Craft Brewery, and featured a lineup headlined by Tony Trischka and Tim O'Brien.

For the second installment, the event was moved to the much larger grounds of Druid Hill Park. The lineup featured Jerry Douglas, Noam Pikelny & Friends, Sierra Hull, Chris Eldridge, Julian Lage, and Cris Jacobs. Attendance almost doubled from the first year.

In 2015, the event returned to Druid Hill Park and added a second stage. The lineup included The Travelin' McCourys, The Wood Brothers, Frank Solivan & Dirty Kitchen, Cris Jacobs, and the Seldom Scene.

In 2016, the Charm City Bluegrass featured Ricky Skaggs, Keller Williams and the Traveling McCourys, Steep Canyon Rangers, Cris Jacobs, Sierra Hull, Cabinet, Colebrook Road, Man About A Horse and Ampersand Stringband. This year's event also featured the addition of the Bluegrass Academy, where performers gave lessons and discussed their music with fans for free in a dedicated tent. The festival took place on April 30, 2016.

Following the 2016 edition, the Charm City Bluegrass Festival was awarded an International Bluegrass Music Association Momentum Award for Event of the Year.

In 2017, the featival returned to Druid Hill Park with a lineup headlined by the Lone Bellow, the super-group of Adam Aijala and Ben Kaufmann from Yonder Mountain String Band and Drew Emmitt and Andy Thorn from Leftover Salmon, Cabinet, Seldom Scene, Cris Jacobs, Dust Bowl Revival, and Lonesome River Band.

In 2018, a documentary, Charm City Bluesgrass: A Renewed Baltimore Tradition, directed by Marc Shapiro and filmed by Caplan & Green Productions, was released, highlighting the festival's continuing role in keeping alive the long tradition of bluegrass music in Baltimore. The documentary's release was celebrated with a screening and concert at Baltimore radio station WTMD.

In 2018, the event was expanded to two days. It was headlined by The Travelin' McCourys, The Devil Makes Three, The SteelDrivers, and included the Jeff Austin Band, Billy Strings, Caleb Stine, the Larry Keel Experience, and Trout Steak Revival.

In 2019, the Friday night headliner was Jeff Austin in one of his final live performances before dying that June. Other bands included The Bridge, Deer Tick, and Town Mountain.

The festival was canceled in 2020 and 2021 due to the COVID-19 pandemic. It returned in 2022 with a two-day event at Druid Hill Park. The lineup featured Hiss Golden Messenger, Yonder Mountain String Band, Larry Keel, and the Lil Smokies.

For its tenth anniversary, the festival returned to where it started, the grounds of Union Craft Brewery in Baltimore, May 5 & 6, 2023. The two-day event was headlined by The Infamous Stringdusters, Cris Jacobs, and The Steel Wheels.

== Awards and recognition ==
- 2014 - Baltimore Magazine: Best Festival
- 2015 - Baltimore Magazine: Best Music Festival Readers Choice
- 2016 - International Bluegrass Music Association: Momentum Award for Event of the Year

== Lineups by year ==
=== 2013 ===
Location: Union Craft Brewery

Dates: April 27, 2013

Tony Trischka, Tim O'Brien, Cris Jacobs, Caleb Stine, Letita VanSant, the Honey Dewdrops, Pretty Gritty, Chester River Runoff, Feinwood, Trace Friends Mucho, DJ Bohfunk

=== 2014 ===
Location: Druid Hill Park

Dates: April 30, 20

Jerry Douglas, Noam Pikelny & Friends, Chris Eldridge & Julian Lage, Sierra Hull, Cris Jacobs, Audie Blaylock & Redline, Trace Friends Mucho, Mad Sweet Pangs, Ken & Brad Kolodner

=== 2015 ===
Location: Druid Hill Park

Dates: April 25, 2015

The Travelin' McCourys, The Wood Brothers, Frank Solivan & Dirty Kitchen, The Seldom Scene, Grand Ole’ Ditch, The Bumper Jacksons, Letitia VanSant, Cris Jacobs, Chester River Runoff, Charm City Junction, Herd of Main Street, Manly Deeds

=== 2016 ===
Location: Druid Hill Park

Dates: April 30, 2016

Ricky Skaggs & Kentucky Thunder, Keller Williams & The Travelin' McCourys, Steep Canyon Rangers, Sierra Hull, Cris Jacobs, Cabinet, Colebrook Road, Man About A Horse

=== 2017 ===
Location: Druid Hill Park

Dates: April 29, 2017

The Lone Bellow, Aijala-Kaufmann-Emmitt-Thorn (Adam Aijala, Ben Kaufmann, Drew Emmitt, Andy Thorn), Cabinet, Seldom Scene, Cris Jacobs, Dustbowl Revival, Lonesome River Band, Horseshoes & Hand Grenades, Valerie Smith and Liberty Pike, Danny Paisely & The Southern Grass, Kitchen Dwellers, Country Current (the U.S. Navy Bluegrass Band), Frankie Short & The Northern Connection, Dirty Grass Players

=== 2018 ===
Location: Druid Hill Park

Dates: April 27–28, 2018

The Devil Makes Three, The Travelin' McCourys, The SteelDrivers, Jeff Austin Band, Billy Strings, Larry Keel Experience, Caleb Stine, Trout Steak Revival, Special Consensus, Front Country, Lonely Heartstring Band, Circa Blue, The Honey Dewdrops, Country Current (U.S. Navy Bluegrass Band), Bluestone, Mile Twelve, Mountain Ride, Haint Blue, Colebrook Road, The High and Wides, Man About a Horse.

=== 2019 ===
Location : Druid Hill Park

Dates: April 26–27, 2019

Jeff Austin Band, Rob Ickes & Trey Hensley, Town Mountain, Fireside Collective, The Bridge, Deer Tick, Steep Canyon Rangers, The Seldom Scene, Hawktail, Frank Solivan & Dirty Kitchen, Front Country, Charm City Junction, Jon Stickley Trio, Blue Octane, Gangstagrass, The 19th Street Band, Maybe April, Blue Train, Ultrafaux

=== 2022 ===
Location: Druid Hill Park

Dates: April 29–30, 2022

Yonder Mountain String Band, the Larry Keel Experience, the Po' Ramblin' Boys, Justin Trawick and the Common Good, Hampden Bluegrass All-Star Band, Hiss Golden Messenger, the Lil Smokies, the Hackensaw Boys, Armchair Boogie, AJ Lee & Blue Summit, Fireside Collective, Charm City Junction, Jake Blount, Wicked Sycamore, Darlingtyn, Bill and the Belles, Barbaro, Henhouse Prowlers, Dori Freeman, U.S. Navy Band Country Current, Jeremy Garrett

=== 2023 ===
Location: Union Craft Brewery

Dates: May 5–6, 2023

The Infamous Stringdusters, Cris Jacobs, Magic Beans, Roots of Creation, Fireside Collective, Wood Belly, Pert Near Sandstone, the Honey Dewdrops, High and Wides, Caleb Stine, Hampden Bluegrass All-Star Band, the Wildmans, Chatham Rabbits, Allie Kral, the Steel Wheels, Grateful Dub, Twisted Pine, Parker Zelter McCown, D.T. Huber, Whale Show

== See also ==
- List of bluegrass music festivals
- List of country music festivals
- Bluegrass in Baltimore
