= Ask the Fish =

Ask The Fish

Live album by Leftover Salmon
- Released: 1995
- Recorded: October 28–29, 1994
- Venue: Fox Theatre, Boulder, Colorado
- Genre: Bluegrass, rock, country
- Length: 62:54

Leftover Salmon chronology
Bridges to Bert (1993)	Ask The Fish (1995)	Euphoria (1997)

Ask The Fish is a live album by Leftover Salmon originally released in 1995. It was reissued once in 1997 by Hollywood Records, and again in 2001 on Bert Records. The album was recorded live at the Fox Theatre in Boulder, Colorado, on October 28 and 29, 1994.

The album is mentioned in Beth Groundwater's 2009 novel To Hell in a Handbasket.

== Reception ==
Professional ratings
Review scores
Source	Rating
AllMusic	3/5 stars

In a review for AllMusic, Brian Beatty noted that the album "goes a long way toward explaining the band's popularity with a growing fan base," and wrote: "Skillfully hopping from genre to genre, often within a single song, the band plays with the muscle that a lot of noodling jam bands lack. There's also an ever-present sense of humor... that's as fractured as the band's good-time hippie sound."

Dallas Embry of Louisville Music News described the album as "an hour-long concert of subdued mayhem, jazzy noodling on bluegrass instruments, fish sounds, gibberish and some fine music," and commented: "Put it all together and you have a talented, fun-loving, party down group of guys whom I would love to see in concert."

Writing for The Aspen Times, Stewart Oksenhorn stated that the album featured "the band's goofiness as much as its musical prowess," and remarked that it "showed the band mixing its zydeco, bluegrass and rock influences... with an environmental message about marine life, delivered with typical eccentricity."

== Track listing ==
1. "Carnival Time" (Unknown) - 3:48
2. "Bend in the River" (Drew Emmitt) - 3:03
3. "Ask the Fish" (Vince Herman, Traditional) - 8:52
4. "Lonesome Road" (Emmitt) - 4:23
5. "Two Step au Will/Madame Rosin" (Balfa, Herman, Traditional) - 5:56
6. "Rueben's Train" (Traditional) - 5:35
7. "When the Levee Breaks" (Memphis Minnie) - 9:05
8. "Jokester" (Vince Farsetta) - 3:36
9. "Stay Away Monday" (Herman, Sorrentino) - 2:53
10. "Cactus Flower" (Pritchard) - :30
11. "Hot Corn/Cold Corn" (Traditional) - 3:41
12. "Come on Home" (Handy) - 5:03
13. "Rocky Road Blues" (Bill Monroe) - 3:49
14. "70s Lick" (Traditional) - :31
15. "Headbag" (Herman, Jogerst, Vann) - 5:59

== Personnel ==
Leftover Salmon:

- Vince Herman - vocals, acoustic guitar, rubboard
- Drew Emmitt - electric guitar, acoustic and electric mandolin, fiddle, vocals
- Mark Vann - banjo, vocals
- Tye North - bass, vocals
- Michael Wooten - drums, percussion
