= History of the Appalachian people in Baltimore =

The city of Baltimore, Maryland, includes a significant Appalachian population. The Appalachian community has historically been centered in the neighborhoods of Hampden, Pigtown, Remington, Woodberry, Lower Charles Village, Highlandtown, and Druid Hill Park, as well as the Baltimore inner suburbs of Dundalk, Essex, and Middle River. The culture of Baltimore has been profoundly influenced by Appalachian culture, dialect, folk traditions, and music. People of Appalachian heritage may be of any race or religion. Most Appalachian people in Baltimore are white or African-American, though some are Native American or from other ethnic backgrounds. White Appalachian people in Baltimore are typically descendants of early English, Irish, Scottish, Scotch-Irish, and Welsh settlers. A migration of White Southerners from Appalachia occurred from the 1920s to the 1960s, alongside a large-scale migration of African-Americans from the Deep South and migration of Native Americans from the Southeast such as the Lumbee and the Cherokee. These out-migrations caused the heritage of Baltimore to be deeply influenced by Appalachian and Southern cultures.

== History ==
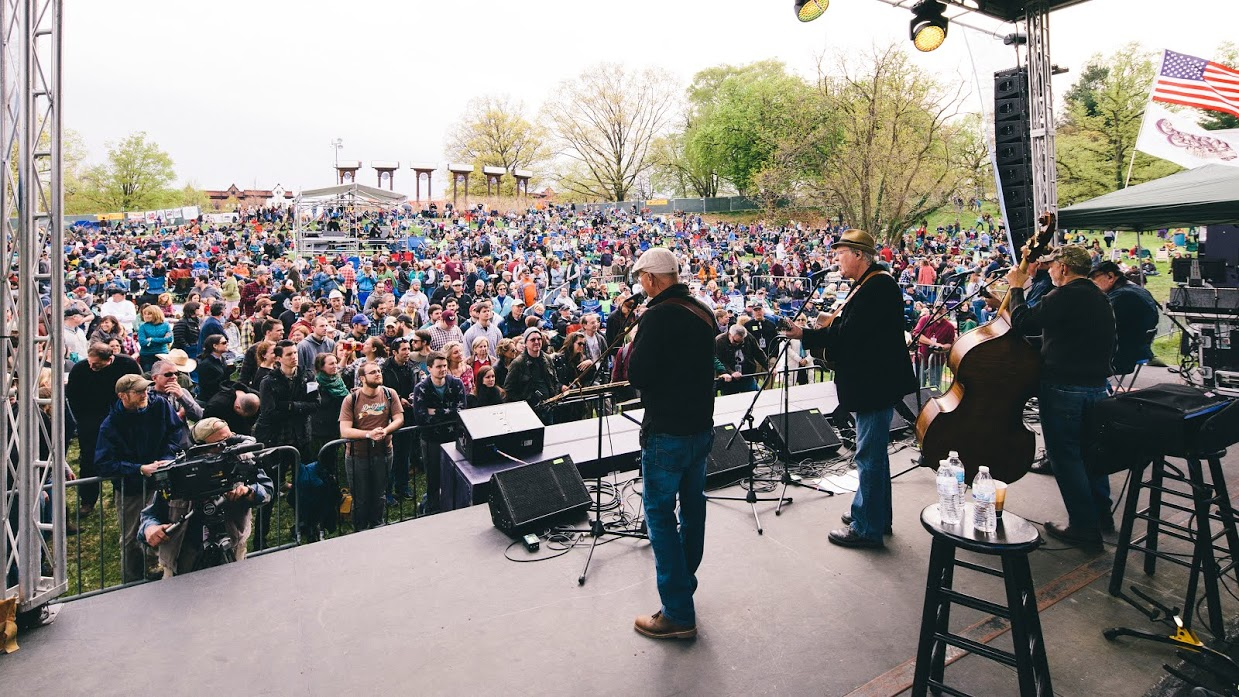
Charm City Bluegrass Festival, April 2015.

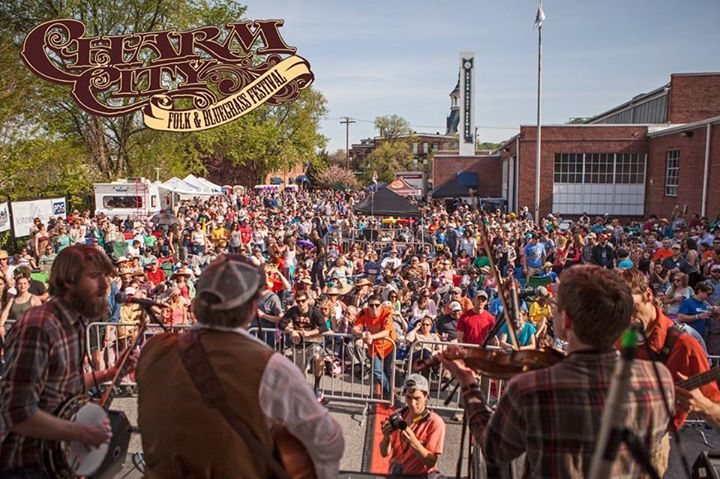
Charm City Bluegrass Festival, August 2013

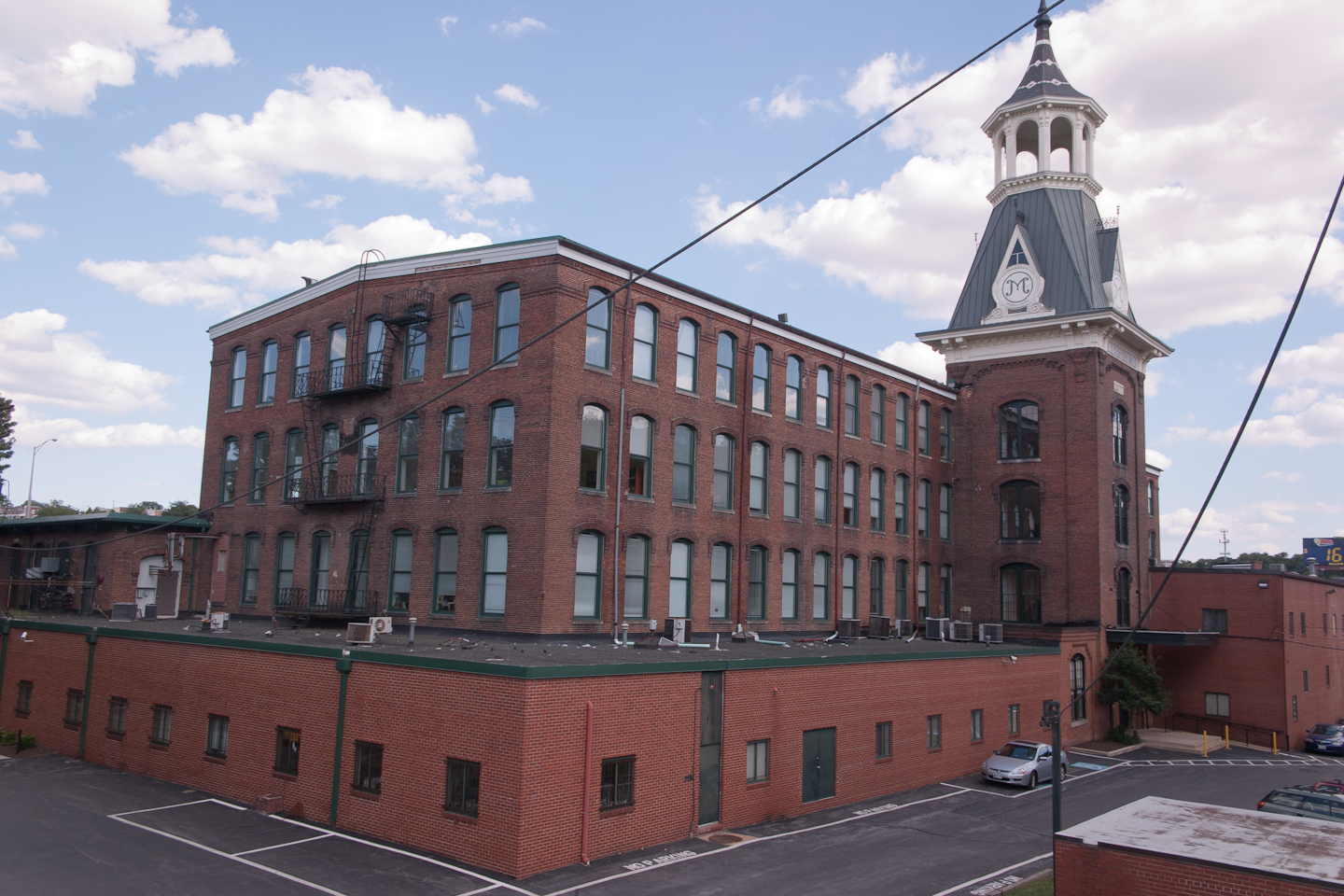
Londontown Manufacturing Company, Inc., an historic cotton mill in Woodberry, an example of one of the many mills that Appalachian migrants worked in along the Jones Falls.

In the early 20th century, many Appalachian farm youth from eastern and northern West Virginia migrated to Baltimore, following the Baltimore and Ohio Railroad. Many Appalachian migrants settled in the neighborhood of Hampden due to the abundance of jobs provided by mills. Hampden was originally created as a residential community for workers at the various mills along the Jones Falls. Most of the Appalachian people in Hampden hailed from Eastern Kentucky, West Virginia, and Western Pennsylvania. This influx of predominantly white Appalachian hillfolk cemented Hampden's reputation as a white working-class neighborhood.

During the Great Depression, thousands of white residents of the Appalachian Mountains migrated to Baltimore as well as to other industrial northern cities such as Detroit, Chicago, Washington, D.C., Cleveland, Pittsburgh, Milwaukee, and Muncie, Indiana. This migration of white Appalachian and Southern people paralleled the Great Migration of African Americans from Appalachia and the South during the same time period. The great white migration from Appalachia has become known as the Hillbilly Highway. During these migrations, approximately 11,000,000 Southerners migrated north; approximately two thirds of them white and one-third of them black. Appalachian migrants to Baltimore were negatively affected by poverty, unemployment, welfare dependency, mechanization of industry, and the decline of the coal industry. Baltimore's factories filled with Appalachian economic migrants between 1910 and 1960, especially in the years during and following World War II. White working-class Appalachian families from the hills of Kentucky, Ohio, Virginia, and West Virginia created Appalachian diaspora enclaves throughout Baltimore and many other cities. So many Black Appalachian and Southern people settled in West Baltimore during the Great Migration that there were whole communities and congregations that earned nicknames such as "Little Virginia", "Little North Carolina", and "Little South Carolina."

Armistead Gardens in East Baltimore, sometimes referred to as "the white ghetto", was originally built by the Housing Authority of Baltimore City as public housing for white people coming to work in industries supplying World War II. Most of these white workers were from Appalachian states such as West Virginia, Kentucky, and Tennessee and came to Baltimore to work at the Glenn L. Martin Company and other major defense plants.

During and following World War II, many Southern and Appalachian workers also settled in Sparrows Point, an industrial area just outside of Baltimore city. These migrants came to work for the Bethlehem Steel plant and largely hailed from rural areas and mining towns of West Virginia and Central Pennsylvania. Many descendants of these migrants still live in the area, particularly in Dundalk, Essex, Middle River, and Armistead Gardens.

In 1984, 1,100 households of Appalachian heritage lived in the neighborhood of Remington. Many of these families traced their origins back to coal towns in Western Pennsylvania and hollows in southern West Virginia. These coal-mining families settled in Baltimore in the 1950s and 1960s, searching for better jobs and better socioeconomic conditions than their parents and grandparents generations had access to. Many of the Appalachian people who settled in Remington worked in factories and mills upon moving to Baltimore. By the 1980s, many of the factories and mills had shut down, resulting in high levels of unemployment. Few wished to relocate back to Appalachia, where economic conditions were even worse. One-third of Remington lived in poverty during the early 1980s, many of them under the age of 18. The majority of Appalachian children in Remington at this time did not graduate high school. Due to low voter turn-out, poor Appalachian whites in Remington had little political clout.

Baltimore was a major destination for Appalachian African-Americans, with many coming from Central and North Alabama, North Georgia, Upstate South Carolina, and Western North Carolina.

== Culture ==
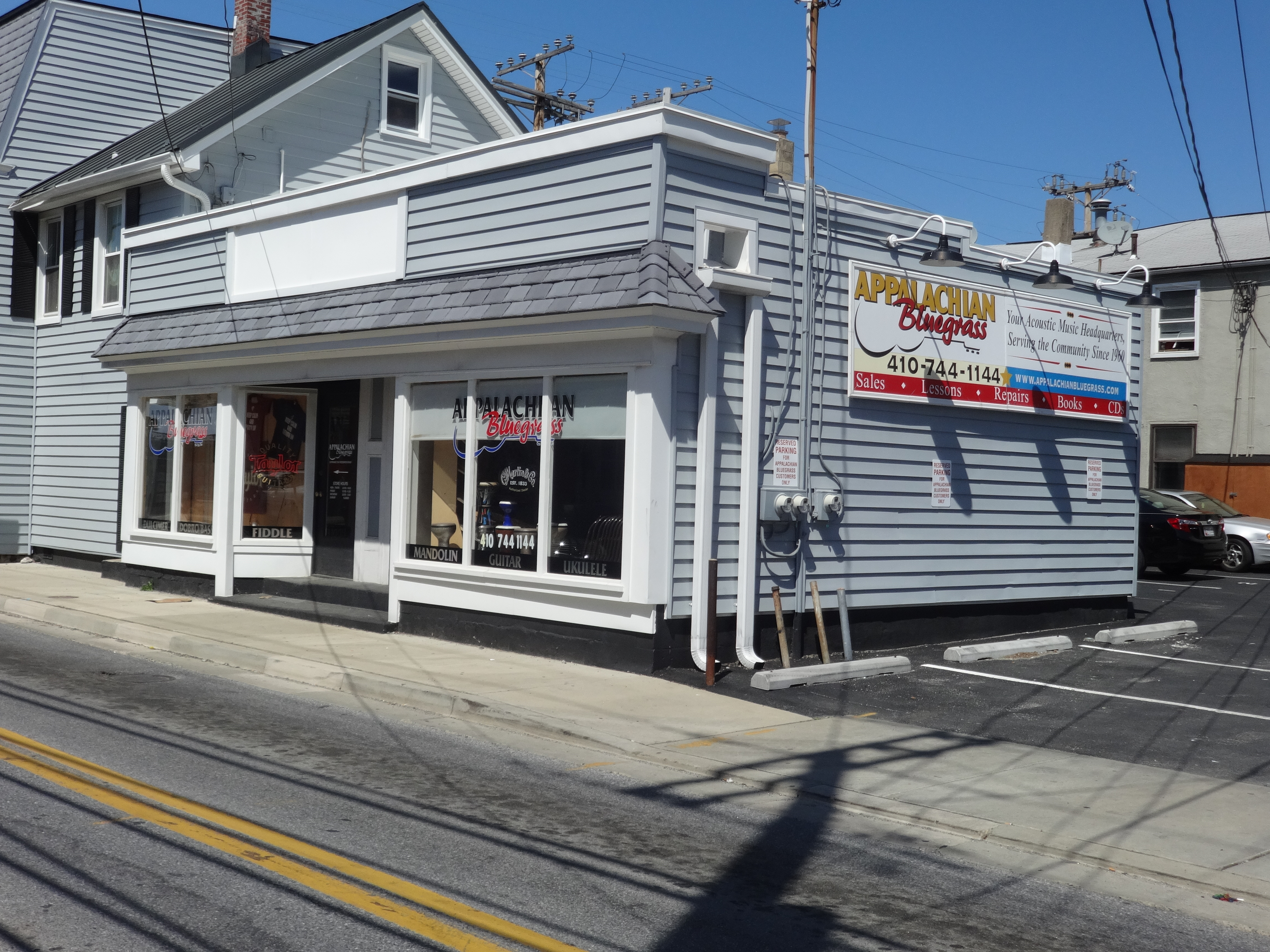
Appalachian Bluegrass music store in the Baltimore inner suburb of Catonsville, April 2015.

Baltimore has a long and distinguished tradition of bluegrass music. The Baltimore–Washington region is home to a thriving bluegrass music community. The bluegrass scene began in the 1930s, as Appalachian migrants to Baltimore brought their musical traditions with them. Following World War II, Baltimore was known as the capital of bluegrass. One of the first breakout bluegrass groups in Baltimore was the Stoney Mountain Boys, the first bluegrass band to play at Carnegie Hall.

Since 2013, the annual Charm City Bluegrass Festival has been held to celebrate the Appalachian musical tradition in Baltimore. In 2015, McFarland & Company published a book by Tim Newby titled Bluegrass in Baltimore, which provides a detailed history of Baltimore's bluegrass scene.

One of the most well-known bluegrass musicians in Baltimore was Hazel Dickens. Dickens was born in Montcalm, West Virginia in 1925 and migrated to Baltimore in the 1950s, following in the footsteps of her siblings who left the coal mines of West Virginia for the better conditions of Baltimore's factories. Her song "Mama's Hand" is a lyrical account of her saying goodbye to her mother before departing to Baltimore by bus. Dickens became the most prominent woman in bluegrass music and was a lifelong champion of the issues of women and the working-class through her pro-labor union, feminist lyrics.

== Religion ==
=== Christianity ===
The majority of Southern and Appalachian migrants during the Hillbilly Highway and the Great Migration, both white and black, were native-born and Protestant. This wave of Protestant migrants transformed the religious fabric of northeastern cities such as Baltimore. Previously, the working-class in the northeast was dominated by "white ethnic" immigrants from Catholic countries of Europe. This "Southernizing" of the American working-class resulted in a large increase of both white Protestant and black Protestant populations in the northeast.

=== Judaism ===
The construction of the Baltimore & Ohio railroad through the Appalachian Mountains to the Ohio River opened up a large market for the Jewish community of Baltimore, with the expanded economy allowing Jews from Baltimore to establish businesses and communities throughout Appalachia. Deborah Weiner, an historian affiliated with the Jewish Museum of Maryland, has published a history of Jews and Judaism in Appalachia titled Coalfield Jews: An Appalachian History. Weiner, who is Jewish and has lived in West Virginia, chronicles the intersection of Appalachia's coal boom from the 1880s to the 1920s and the wave of Eastern European Jewish immigrants to the United States during that same time. According to Weiner, Appalachian Jews find it difficult to fully experience their Jewish heritage in rural areas of Appalachia and so many Appalachian Jews have to leave the mountains to visit relatives in Baltimore and other cities such as New York. Historically, Jewish communities in Appalachia maintained ties to the Jewish community of Baltimore. During the 1920s, the Hebrew Ladies Aid Society of Welch, West Virginia was an annual benefactor to the matzo fund of Baltimore. A strong link has long existed between the Jews of Appalachian Western Maryland and the Jews of Baltimore. The architecture of B'er Chayim Temple in Cumberland is modeled after the earlier Eden Street Synagogue in Baltimore. Many historical items from B'er Chayim are on permanent loan at the Jewish Museum of Maryland.

The Jewish community in Baltimore helped fund the construction of the B’nai Shalom Congregation in Bristol, located in the Appalachian region of Western Virginia.

== Assimilation and discrimination ==
White Appalachian people in Baltimore have experienced both discrimination against their socioeconomic and regional identities, as well as privilege for their race. White Appalachian people and Southern African Americans (including African-Appalachians) were migrating to Baltimore in great numbers between the 1920s and the 1960s, prompting comparisons between the two groups of newcomers. In a 1960 article from The Baltimore Sun, J. Anthony Lukas praised the "pride and independence" of Appalachian white people while lamenting that "after two centuries of isolation in the hills, these original Americans are forced into the cities where they find themselves scorned by relative newcomers to these shores." Lukas cited the sociologist Dr. Olive Quinn's racist claim that white Appalachian people's "deep pride in standing on his own two feet" set them apart from the "Southern Negro [who] comes from a paternalistic society in which he is accustomed to accepting hand-me-downs from whites." Many commentators, including Lukas and Salisbury, conflated white Appalachians with white settler heritage and promoted the view that white Appalachians were noble pioneers whose spirit was being degraded by the experiences of urbanization and industrialization.

In his diaries, the Baltimore journalist H. L. Mencken derided the poor white Appalachian and Southern workers in Baltimore's war plants as "oakies, lintheads, hill-billies and other anthropoids" as well as "vermin". He claimed that white Appalachian people were the only pure Anglo-Saxons left in America, but bemoaned that they were in his view "a wretchedly dirty, shiftless, stupid and rascally people." Mencken believed that "filthy poor whites from Appalachia and the Southern Tide-water" engaged in incest and were animalistic in their "habits and ideas".

Discrimination against Appalachian people existed in housing and accommodations, which contributed to Appalachian migrants clustering into enclaves which became known as "hillbilly ghettos". According to Hazel Dickens, when she was searching for an apartment in 1954 she encountered signs reading "No dogs or hillbillies".

In 1961, the Baltimore section of the National Council of Jewish Women released a report titled "The Unaccepted Baltimoreans", which was a study of white rural Southern migrants in Baltimore. The report concluded that "within recent years, and especially now, the minority of Southern Mountaineers, an increasing drain on the city's economy, is crying for citizen interest and action." The report also examined the cultural and behavioral characteristics of these migrants and claimed there was an urgent need to promote "acculturation" of Appalachian migrants and to persuade them to abandon their allegedly hostile attitude towards education. The author of the report, Ferne K. Kolodner, was a community and civil rights activist who sought to ameliorate the ails of urban poverty. In the course of the study she visited 40 Appalachian homes in Baltimore and interviewed numerous civic leaders. She believed that Appalachian people had a "limited cultural background" and settled in "cultural islands" at odds with the norms of middle class life.

Poor white Appalachian residents of Pigtown report discrimination from the police on the basis of class. Pigtown's Appalachian population hails from West Virginia and Western Maryland, economic migrants who came after World War II. Some poor white residents of Pigtown allege that while poor black people in Pigtown and the nearby neighborhood of Sandtown experience more discrimination due to the combination of racism and classism, poor whites nonetheless experience targeting and harassment from the police. According to David Simon, a police reporter from the Baltimore Sun, a nickname for Pigtown among police officers is "Billyland", derived from the term hillbilly, a derogatory term for poor white Appalachians.

== Notable Appalachian-Americans from Baltimore ==
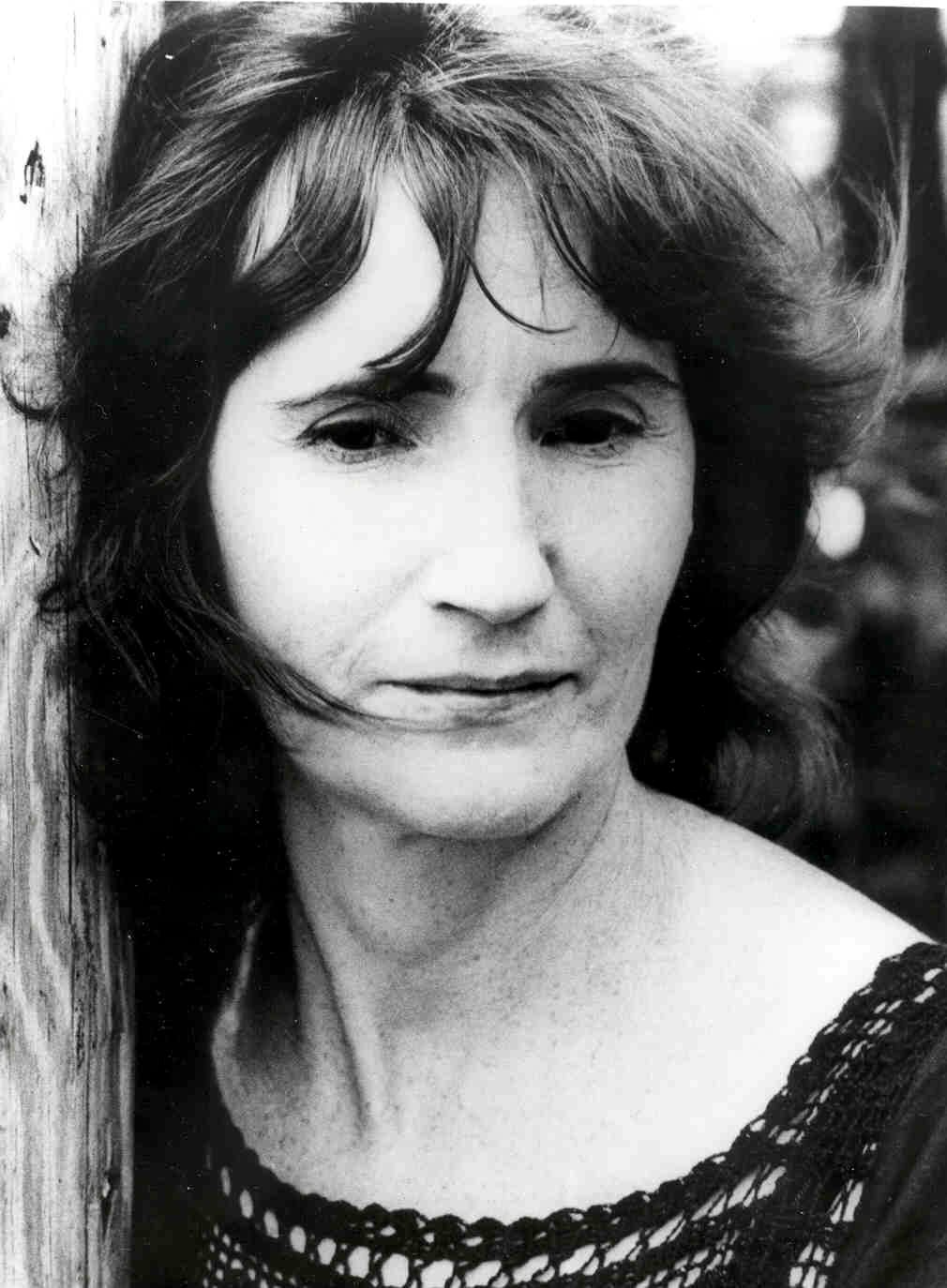
Hazel Dickens, a bluegrass singer-songwriter and labor activist.

- Tori Amos, a singer-songwriter and pianist.
- Cone sisters, Claribel and Etta Cone, wealthy socialite sisters who gathered one of the finest collections of modern French art in the United States.
- Hazel Dickens, a bluegrass singer, songwriter, double bassist and guitarist whose music was characterized by her high, lonesome singing style, as well as her provocative pro-union, feminist songs.
- Shan Goshorn, an Eastern Band Cherokee artist whose multi-media artwork expresses human rights issues, especially those affecting Native Americans.
- Thomas McElhiney, a diplomat and UNRWA's Commissioner-General from 1977 to 1979.
- Chet Pancake, a filmmaker, musician, and activist against mountaintop removal mining who co-founded the Red Room Collective, the High Zero Foundation, the Charm City Kitty Club and the Transmodern Festival.
- Blaze Starr, an American stripper and burlesque star.

== See also ==
- Appalachian stereotypes
- Appalachian studies
- Bluegrass in Baltimore
- Charm City Bluegrass Festival
- Great Migration (African American)
- Hillbilly
- Hillbilly Highway
- History of the African Americans in Baltimore
- History of the Native Americans in Baltimore
- Mountain white
- Poor White
- Redneck
- Trailer trash
- Urban Appalachians
- White trash

== Bibliography ==
- Kolodner, Ferne K. The Unaccepted Baltimoreans: A Study of the White Southern Rural Migrants, the Culturally Different and Disadvantaged Urbanites, National Council of Jewish Women (Baltimore Section), 1962.
- Smith, Thaddeus Mundy. Where There are No Mountains: Appalachian Culture and Migration to Baltimore, Brown University, 1987.
- Weiner, Deborah R. Coalfield Jews: An Appalachian History, University of Illinois Press, 2006.
