= Euphoria (Leftover Salmon album) =

Studio album by Leftover Salmon
- Released: March 18, 1997
- Genre: Bluegrass, rock, country
- Length: 41:52
- Label: Hollywood Records
- Producer: Justin Niebank

Leftover Salmon chronology
| Ask The Fish (1995) | Euphoria (1997) | The Nashville Sessions (1999) |

Euphoria is an album by the American band Leftover Salmon. It was released via Hollywood Records in 1997. The band supported the album by touring with the 1997 H.O.R.D.E. festival.

The album peaked at number three on Billboard's Heatseekers – Mountain chart.

== Production ==
Recorded in Denver, the album was produced by Justin Niebank. Pete Sears contributed keyboard parts to Euphoria.

== Critical reception ==
Professional ratings
Review scores
| Source | Rating |
|---|---|
| AllMusic | 4/5 stars |
| Jambands: The Complete Guide to the Players, Music, & Scene | 3.5/5 stars |

The Gazette called the album a "tame approximation" of the band's live sound. The Pittsburgh Post-Gazette labeled the album "alternative country," and deemed it "tight and conservative." Writer Dean Budnick described the album as "an agreeable representation" of the band's "stylistic hodgepodge," and noted that, in some instances, it "does indeed achieve the state referenced by its title."

== Track listing ==
All songs written by Drew Emmitt, except where noted.

1. "Better" (Vince Herman)
2. "Highway Song"
3. "Baby Hold On"
4. "River's Rising"
5. "Mama Boulet" (Herman)
6. "Funky Mountain Fogdown" (Mark Vann)
7. "Cash on the Barrelhead" (Charlie Louvin and Ira Louvin)
8. "Muddy Water Home"
9. "Ain't Gonna Work" (Traditional)
10. "This Is the Time"
11. "Euphoria" (Robin Remaily)

== Personnel ==
=== Musical ===
- Vince Herman – vocals, acoustic guitar, rubboard
- Drew Emmitt – electric guitar, mandolin, vocals
- Mark Vann – banjo, vocals
- Tye North – bass, vocals
- Michael Wooten – drums, percussion
- Jeremy Lawton – electric piano
- Pete Sears – electric piano, Hammond organ, piano
- Sam Bush – fiddle
- Sally Van Meter – lap steel guitar

=== Technical ===
- Glenn Meadows – mastering
- Jeremy Lawton – electric piano, engineer, assistant engineer
- Leftover Salmon – arranger
- Justin Neibank – arranger, producer, engineer, mixing
