= Telluride Bluegrass Festival =

Music festival

Coordinates: 37°55′59.7″N 107°48′29.4″W

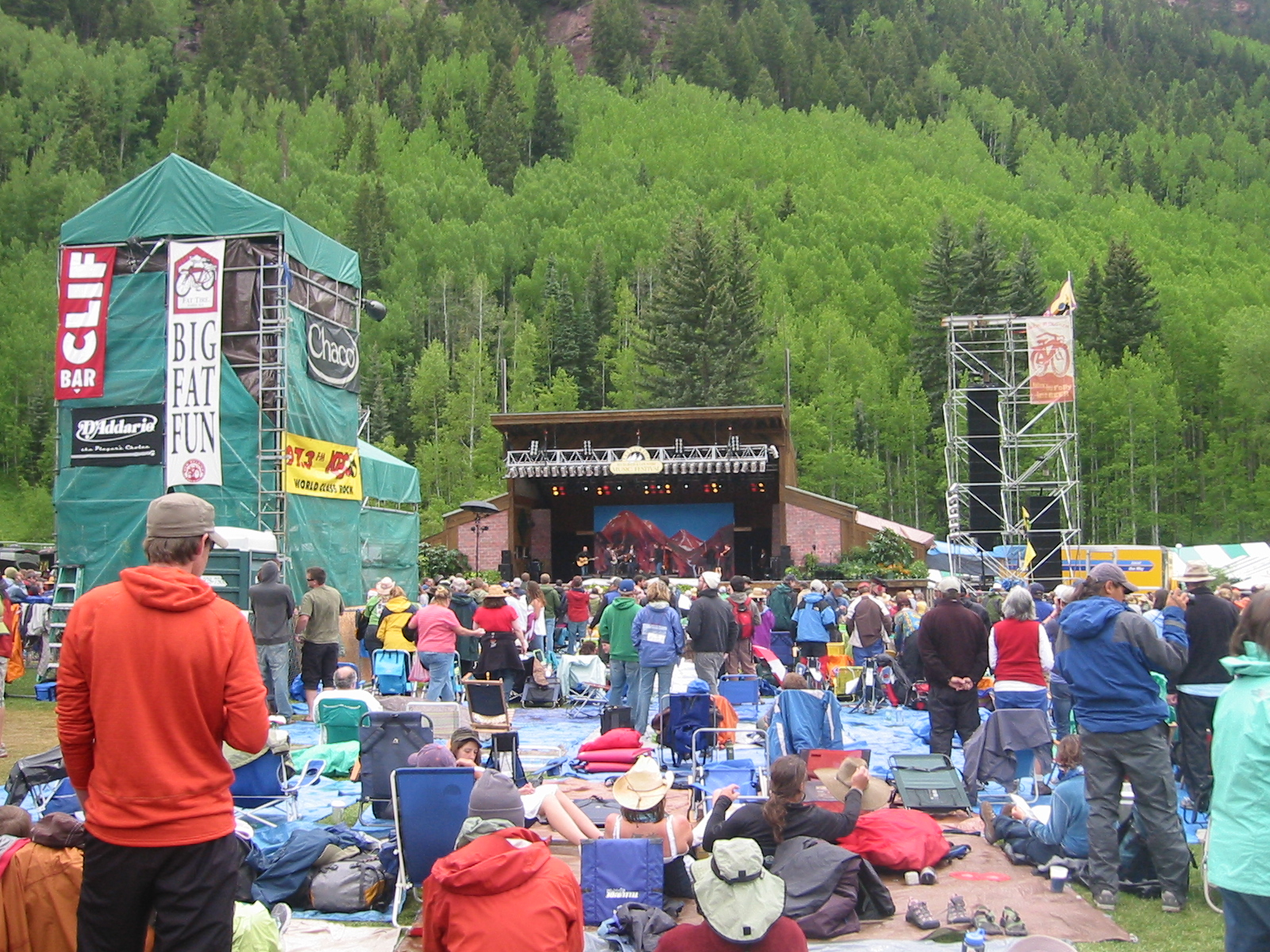
- Main stage of the festival, 2009
- Dates: Third Weekend of June
- Locations: Telluride, Colorado, United States
- Years active: 1973–2019, 2021–
- Website: bluegrass.com/telluride/

Telluride Bluegrass Festival is an annual music festival in Telluride, Colorado hosted by Planet Bluegrass. Although traditionally the festival focuses on bluegrass music, it often features music from a variety of related genres.

== History ==
The town of Telluride had for many years held a Fourth of July Celebration which had its roots in the early mining days of Telluride, when miners would come from down from the mountains to party and meet up with old friends and meet some women. The celebration included a fireworks display operated by the local fire department. In 1972, the Telluride Ski Resort opened, and the Town of Telluride expanded the Celebration and advertised it widely in all the surrounding states. Among the new attendees were many who behaved badly, starting fights and causing damage; in response, the Town decided to call off the celebration for 1973.

A small group of friends convinced the Town to let them organized the 1973 event. The traditional rowdy events were replaced with games in the park for children, a picnic and barbeque. A stage was built at the far end of Town Park, and after a parade and an afternoon of family fun, the Fall Creek Boys, a local bluegrass band, took the stage to entertain the crowd, followed by the traditional fireworks display.

Encouraged by the success of the 1973 celebration, the first Telluride Bluegrass Festival was organized in Telluride in 1974 by John Herndon, J.B. & Helen Matiotti, Kooster McAllister, and Fred Shellman, who played in the Fall Creek Boys. That year the festival attracted approximately 1000 participants.

The festival became an annual event with attendance capped at 10,000. According to the Library of Congress, the 1980 performance was filmed by Boulder public television and two CDs were made available.

The management of the Bluegrass Festival has changed five times since its inception and is currently managed by Craig Ferguson of Planet Bluegrass.

Although it has been remodeled several times, the stage is still in the original spot, as are the concession stands.

Since at least 2013, capacity has been set at 12,000 per day (48,000 total over the four days of the festival).

In 2013 the festival was impacted by flooding, but returned to its former condition in 2014.

In 2015 the festival's official name is the Telluride Bluegrass and Country Music Festival.

There was no festival in 2020.

== Acts ==
Notable performers have included Tenacious D, Greensky Bluegrass, Tyler Childers, Kacey Musgraves, Johnny Cash, Sam Bush, Elvis Costello, David Byrne, John Fogerty, Bruce Cockburn, Joan Armatrading, Jackson Browne, Jesse Winchester, Levon Helm, Russell Smith, Shawn Colvin, Steve Earle, Darrell Scott, David Crosby/CPR, Linda Ronstadt, Steve Winwood, Chris Daniels & The Kings, Bill Monroe, Nanci Griffith, Mark O'Conner, Dixie Chicks, String Cheese Incident, New Monsoon, Sharon Gilchrist, Railroad Earth, New Grass Revival, Emmylou Harris, Alison Krauss and Union Station, Willie Nelson, Robert Plant, John Prine, Nickel Creek, Yonder Mountain String Band, Mumford & Sons, Steve Martin and the Steep Canyon Rangers, Peter Rowan, Leftover Salmon, Béla Fleck, Chris Thile, Sara Watkins, Noam Pikelny, Conor Oberst and the Mystic Valley Band, Tim O'Brien, Counting Crows, Mary Chapin Carpenter, Hot Rize, the Del McCoury Band, Brandi Carlile, Powder Ridge, Janelle Monae, Dierks Bentley, Norah Jones, Parker Millsap, and Lyle Lovett, Nanci Griffith, to name a few. The Telluride house band consists of Sam Bush on mandolin, Béla Fleck on banjo, Stuart Duncan on fiddle, Jerry Douglas on Dobro, Edgar Meyer on upright Bass, and Bryan Sutton on guitar. The 2007 Michelle Shocked gospel CD, ToHeavenURide was recorded live at the Festival.

== Band contest ==
One of the features of the festival is a band contest. Twelve bands are given slots in the competition. Judges rate the bands and the top four go to the main stage to compete before the crowd.

Past winners include:

- 1985 - Blitz Creek
- 1986 - Loose Ties (Runners-up Blue Plate Special)
- 1988 - Titan Valley Warheads
- 1989 - Powder Ridge
- 1990 - Dixie Chicks
- 1991 - Meighan Edmonson Mittelmeier Band
- 1992 - Sugarbeat
- 1993 - String Fever
- 1994 - Salt Licks
- 1995 - Magraw Gap
- 1996 - Cornbread Sally
- 1997 - Ryan Shupe & Rubberband
- 1998 - Floodplain Gang
- 1999 - Pagosa Hot Strings
- 2000 - Clear Blue
- 2001 - Bearfoot Bluegrass
- 2002 - South Austin Jug Band
- 2003 - Hit & Run Bluegrass
- 2004 - Burnett Family Bluegrass Band
- 2005 - The Badly Bent
- 2006 - Greensky Bluegrass
- 2007 - Spring Creek Bluegrass Band
- 2008 - Blue Canyon Boys
- 2009 - The Hillbenders
- 2010 - Nora Jane Struthers & the Bootleggers
- 2011 - Run Boy Run
- 2012 - BlueBilly Grit
- 2013 - Front Country
- 2014 - Trout Steak Revival
- 2015 - The Lil' Smokies
- 2016 - Fireball Mail
- 2017 - Sugar and the Mint : sugarandthemint.com
- 2018 - Wood Belly
- 2019 - Bowregard
- 2022 - Full Cord
- 2023 - The Fretliners
- 2024 - Still House String Band
- 2025 - Rachael Sumner & Travelin Light

== Book ==
Dan Sadowsky, Telluride's Emcee for twenty nine years as "Pastor Mustard", has written a book about the festival. It is entitled Telluride Bluegrass Festival — 40 Years of Festivation.

== See also ==
- Live at the Telluride Bluegrass Festival
- Too Late to Turn Back Now
- Leftover Salmon: Thirty Years of Festival!
- List of bluegrass music festivals
- List of jam band music festivals
