= Hydrophonic =

Hydrophonic may refer to:

- Hydrophonic (New Monsoon album), 2001
- Hydrophonic (Soup Dragons album), 1992

== See also ==
- Hydroponics, a subset of hydroculture
