= Run Boy Run =

Run Boy Run may refer to:

- Run Boy Run (film), a 2013 German-French-Polish co-production
- Run Boy Run (band), a progressive bluegrass band
- "Run Boy Run" (song), a 2012 single by Woodkid
- "Run Boy Run", an episode of The Umbrella Academy
