= Mockingbird Foundation =

Nonprofit organization associated with Phish

The Mockingbird Foundation is a charitable organization founded by fans of the jam band Phish in 1996 (legally incorporated the following year) to support music education for children. Unconventional in structure, it exists almost entirely online, allowing a higher percentage of income to be distributed directly to deserving organizations. Projects include the publication of The Phish Companion and the production of the Phish tribute album Sharin' in the Groove. As of July 29, 2026, Mockingbird had provided 803 disbursements (through grants and other awards) totaling over $3,000,000; sold over 70,000 copies of The Phish Companion; and sold over 25,000 copies of Sharin' in the Groove. The organization was recognized officially by Phish when, in 2004, the band donated all proceeds from their Livephish download service to the Mockingbird Foundation.

== The Phish Companion ==
The Mockingbird Foundation is a leading provider of historical information about the band Phish and its music. The Foundation's book project, The Phish Companion, is a comprehensive and authoritative reference chronicling Phish and their music, including years preceding and following the band's own history. It was researched with the help of all official Phish sources, including band archivist Kevin Shapiro, bassist Mike Gordon, lyricist Tom Marshall, and others. Over 1,500 named fans contributed to the First Edition, with several hundred more augmenting the second.

The third edition of The Phish Companion: A Guide to the Band & Their Music is a hard-bound, 898-page, full-color reference guide, with setlists, song histories, charts, show reviews, fan stories, and 128 pages of Phish photography – most of which has never been published.

== Sharin' in the Groove ==
A Phish tribute album, Sharin' in the Groove, features nearly two hours of music from 23 individual acts including The Wailers, Dave Matthews, Jimmy Buffett, John Scofield, Arlo Guthrie, the Stanford Marching Band, The Vermont Youth Orchestra, Tom Marshall, as well as members of the Trey Anastasio's band, Jefferson Airplane, Talking Heads, and Los Lobos. It was produced independently on an all-volunteer basis: none of the artists, managers, studios, or others involved received compensation for their contribution. The tracks are arranged like a live show, including two sets and an encore.

== Phish.net ==
The Foundation formally adopted the fan website Phish.net as a project January 17, 2005. The site had begun in 1991 and served Phish fans for nearly two decades as static HTML pages. It was re-launched as an integrated database of setlists, song histories, reviews, and more in fall 2009.

== Runaway Open ==
The Foundation has held a series of events (poker, poster/art, yoga, road race, wine tasting, and golf), including an annual charity golf tournament for Phish fans starting in 2016. The Runaway Open event name makes reference to several Phish songs, including "Runaway Jim" and "Kung", the latter of which includes the line, "Yes, we can stage a runaway golf cart marathon." The event has taken place at six course in three states (NV, CO, and CA). The 10th Annual Runaway Open was April 27, 2025, at De Bell Golf Club in Burbank

== DeLucia Awards ==
In 2004, the Foundation announced plans to acknowledge innovative work in music education through the institution of the DeLucia Awards, named for Mockingbird founder and originator of The Phish Companion, Craig DeLucia. The first DeLucia Awards were announced in May 2006.

There may be up to five DeLucia Award recipients in a given year; and each year, one recipient will also be awarded the DeLucia Prize, a monetary complement of $1,000. The recipient(s) should have accomplished something which effectively developed musical abilities, made efficient use of available resources, could be replicated in other settings, and might inspire others to seek, provide, and/or support music education. The recipient(s) will have demonstrated a passion for music education such as by teaching in an exceptional, innovative, or unique manner; impacting their communities in a substantial way; or using unconventional techniques, discourse, or concepts in their roles as music educators.
