= Downstream (album) =

Studio album by New Monsoon
- Released: 2003
- Recorded: Feb – Nov 2002
- Genres: Rock, jazz, world
- Label: Sci Fidelity

New Monsoon chronology
Hydrophonic (2001)	Downstream (2003)	Live at the Telluride Bluegrass Festival (2004)

Downstream is the second studio album by the San Francisco, California-based band New Monsoon. It was recorded over a period of months from February to November in 2002 and was released in early 2003.

== Track listing ==
1. Mountain Air
2. Painted Moon
3. Downstream
4. Velvet Pouch
5. Bo's Blues
6. Ladybug
7. Don't Feel Welcome
8. Double Clutch
9. Sunman
10. One of These Days
11. Chakar Dar D'Abaji
12. Liquid Blue
13. Circle

== Personnel ==
New Monsoon:

Brian Carey - percussion, conga, timbales
Heath Carlisle - bass, guitar, vocals, engineer, mixing, photography, cover art
Phil Ferlino - organ, piano, keyboards, vocals, guitar, mixing, engineer
Rajiv Parikh - percussion, tabla, vocals
Bo Carper - acoustic guitar, banjo, dobro
Jeff Miller - guitar (electric), vocals (background)
Marty Ylitalo - drums, didjeridu

John Greenham - mastering
