= Erik Deutsch =

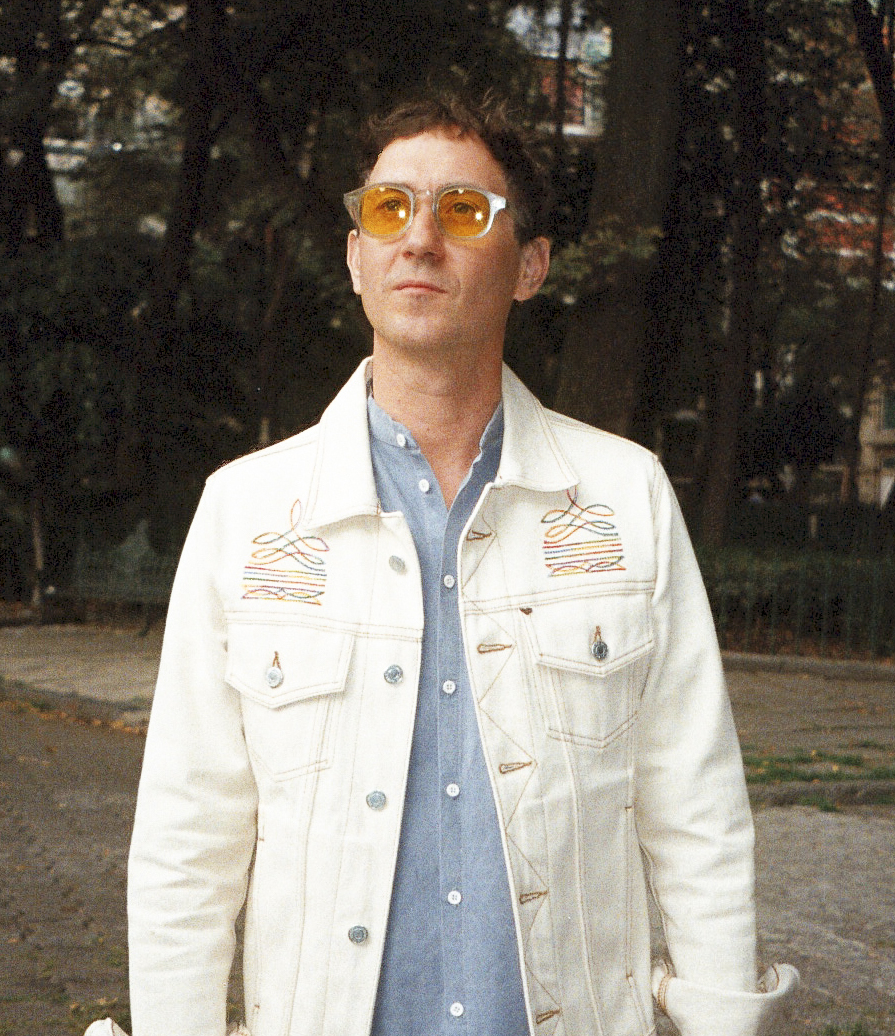
- Erik Deutsch, Mexico City 2020

Background information
- Born: Erik Larson Deutsch; October 26, 1976 (age 49); Washington, D.C.
- Occupations: Keyboardist, composer, producer
- Instruments: Piano, keyboards, guitar
- Years active: 1990s–present
- Website: hammerandstring.com

Erik Deutsch is an American pianist, keyboardist, composer, arranger, bandleader, and educator. He leads his own band and was a founding member of Fat Mama. Deutsch is also known for his work with Charlie Hunter, Leftover Salmon, Dixie Chicks, Shooter Jennings, Citizen Cope and The Black Crowes.

== Early life ==
Deutsch was born in Washington D.C. in 1976. Influenced at an early age by his grandfather (a professional musician), his father (a barroom pianist), and his opera-singing nanny. Deutsch began taking Suzuki piano lessons at Vanderbilt University. After his family relocated to Nashville he studied piano with Tom Koester. In 1985 Deutsch won a school song writing contest that led to his first gig at the Country Music Hall of Fame. While attending High School in Potomac, MD, Deutsch frequented the jazz clubs of Washington D.C. Upon arriving at the University of Colorado Boulder in the fall 1995 he began lessons with pianists Art Lande and joined Fat Mama, a modern jazz/rock/fusion ensemble.

== Career ==
=== 2000s ===
After completing his degree from CU in piano performance, Deutsch stayed in Boulder developing a busy career as a performer and teacher. County Road X, a cinematic Americana ensemble, released two records during this period, County Road X (2002) and From Seed to Stone (2004). Triangle, a piano trio led by Deutsch's musical mentor Art Lande (on drums), released Three Sides to a Question in 2004. He taught and accompanied students frequently and was an adjunct faculty member at the Naropa University.

In the summer of 2005 Deutsch moved to Brooklyn, New York, where he worked at the Queens College, City University of New York Saturday jazz program and in The Bronx public school as a dance accompanist.

In 2007 he joined the Charlie Hunter Trio. His tenure with Hunter lasted 3 years, involving extensive touring all over Europe, Asia, and Africa. They recorded Mistico with drummer Simon Lott and Baboon Strength with drummer Tony Mason.

Deutsch released his first two records as a leader towards the end of the decade. 2007's Fingerprint features fellow Coloradans Ron Miles, Jenny Scheinman, Todd Sickafoose, Allison Miller, Janet Feder and Ross Martin. In a review of 2009's Hush Money The Boston Globe makes mention of the "unmistakable traces of the Alpine air and sweeping CinemaScope views" within Deutsch's music. These efforts also earn him his first feature in Downbeat Magazine.

=== 2010s ===
In 2011 Deutsch collaborated with long-time associate Shooter Jennings for two records, Family Man and The Other Life. Inevitably other similar collaborations ensued including work with Rosanne Cash, John Leventhal, Shelby Lynne, Allison Moorer, Norah Jones, Bob DiPiero and Jim Campilongo.

2012 marked the release of Deutsch’s third release as a leader, Demonio Teclado revealing a new psychedelic soul jazz sound.

In 2014, Deutsch released Outlaw Jazz a critically acclaimed record fusing his brand of jazz with elements of country.

In 2016, Deutsch joined Colorado based jam band Leftover Salmon. His four-year stint as a full-time member included over 400 shows and the release of three records.

Deutsch released his first solo piano album Creatures in 2016. Downbeat Magazine critic Allan Drouot wrote, "Deutsch's pieces are imbued with the same mournfulness and simplicity that inhabits Satie's piano music."

In 2018 Deutsch released another large group project entitled Falling Flowers.

=== 2020s and Mexico ===
Since 2015, Deutsch has hosted a weekly bi-lingual radio show called the Sounds of Brooklyn and Beyond with co-host Sara Valenzuela. The program airs on Jalisco Radio in Guadalajara, Puerto Vallarta, and Ciudad Guzman and is available as a podcast on iTunes and Spotify.

In 2019 Deutsch relocated to Colonia Roma Norte in Mexico City.

In 2020, Deutsch joined The Chicks (formerly Dixie Chicks) as the full-time touring keyboardist. Deutsch released Live at LunÁticoand an improvised solo 7” LP on Piquinique Recordings entitled Chrysanthemum as well as a new project with banjoist Andy Thorn entitled Tangled Sea.

In August 2022, he replaced Joel Robinow in The Black Crowes.

== Awards and honors ==
Deutsch has been nominated consecutively in Downbeat Magazine Critic's Poll Rising Star organ category since 2012.

== Discography ==
=== As leader ===
- 2007 Fingerprint (Sterling Circle)
- 2009 Hush Money (Hammer & String)
- 2012 Demonio Teclado (Hammer & String)
- 2015 Outlaw Jazz (Cumberland Brothers Music)
- 2016 Creatures (Immersive Records)
- 2018 Falling Flowers (LoHi Records)
- 2020 Live at LunÁtico (Hammer & String)
- 2020 Erik Deutsch & Spencer Zahn, Chrysanthemum (Piquenique)
- 2021 Erik Deutsch, Shape of a Monster (Ear Up Records)

=== As co-leader ===
- 1997 Fat Mama, Mamatus
- 1999 Fat Mama, Live †
- 2000 Fat Mama, Load Star (Phoenix Media)
- 2002 County Road X, (Adventure Records)
- 2004 Country Road X, From Seed to Stone (Adventure Records)
- 2004 Triangle, Three Sides to a Question (Synergy Music)
- 2016 Victoria Reed, Chariot
- 2018 Leftover Salmon, Something Higher (LOS Records/Soundly Music)
- 2019 Victoria Reed, Everything for You (single)
- 2019 Leftover Salmon, Live From the Living Room
- 2020 Victoria Reed, Aqua Madre (Fisica Moderna)
- 2020 Leftover Salmon, On the Road: A Tribute to John Hartford (LoHi)
- 2020 Deutsch/Zahn: Chrysanthemum (Pique-nique Recordings)
- 2020 Deutsch & Thorn: Tangled Sea
- 2021 Leftover Salmon, Brand New Good Old Days
- 2022 Leftover Salmon, On the Road: A Tribute to John Hartford (compilation)
- 2021 Victoria Reed, Highway Butterfly: The Songs of Neal Casal
- 2022 Victoria Reed, Door Four (single)
- 2022 Victoria Reed, Forever Ain't Enough Time (single)
- 2023 Victoria Reed, Even When Its Night

=== As sideman and co-producer ===
- 2002 The Motet, Live
- 2006 Ron Miles, Stone/Blossom (Sterling Circle)
- 2006 Mr. V, Welcome Home MR. V (Louie Vega)
- 2006 Roy Ayers Remized (BE)
- 2006 Kerri Chandler & Dennis Ferrer: Soul Heaven (Soul Heaven)
- 2006 Mr. V, Untitled Love Affair (Mr V Sole Channel Dub)
- 2006 Marc Houle, Bay of Figs (Minus)
- 2007 Charlie Hunter Trio, Baboon Strength (Spire)
- 2007 Charlie Hunter Trio, Mistico (Fantasy)
- 2007 Erin McKeown, Lafayette (Signature Sounds)
- 2007 Monday Michiru, Nexus (ArtistShare)
- 2008 Jessica Lurie Ensemble, Shop of Wild Dreams
- 2009 The Junction, Another Link in the Chain (The Junction Inc)
- 2010 Frally Hynes, The Light
- 2012 Jessica Lurie Ensemble, Megaphone Heart
- 2012 Shooter Jennings, Family Man
- 2013 Carrie Rodriguez, Give Me All You've Got (Ninth Street Opus)
- 2013 Shooter Jennings, The Other Life
- 2013 Erin McKeown, Mannifestra (TVP)
- 2013 Frally Hynes, Apis Mellifera
- 2014 Aaron Lee Tasjan, Crooked River Burning (Rockwood Music Hall Recordings)
- 2015 Kristin Andreassen, Gondolier
- 2015 Arielle Dombasle, French Kiss (Universal)
- 2016 Eric Hutchinson, Easy Street (Let's Break)
- 2016 Michael Blake, Red Hook Soul (Ropeadope)
- 2016 Anya Marina, Paper Plane
- 2016 Greg Humphreys, Electric Trio Lucky Guy
- 2016 Hillbilly Moon Explosion, Of Monsters and Gods, Jungle
- 2016 Dori Freeman, Self-titled (Free Dirt)
- 2016 Dori Freeman, Letters Never Read (Free Dirt)
- 2017 Shelby Lynne & Allison Moorer, Not Dark Yet
- 2017 Shooter Jennings, Live at Billy Bob's Texas
- 2020 Teddy Thompson, Heartbreaker Please, Thirty Tigers
- 2021 Shooter Jennings, Gene’s Song (single)
- 2021 Shooter Jennings, Leave These Memories Alone (single)
- 2021 Hawkfather & the Swiss Enigma
- 2021 Destani, Wolf Bye Bye (single)
- 2021 Aliage, Despues de un Dia (single)
- 2021 Erin Mckeown, Kiss Off Kiss
- 2021 Gatos Blancos, Bangkok 45 (single)
- 2021 Simon Kafka, Better Things for Better Living
- 2021 Sunny Ozell, Breathe With Me
- 2022 Sydney Clapp, Chrysalis (single)
- 2022 Love Crushed Velvet, Souls and the Barren Heart
- 2022 Andy Thorn, Song of the Sunrise Fox
- 2022 Brazos, Grab Hold of What Floats (Sudden Records)
- 2022 Dusty Wright, Lonleyville
- 2022 Dusty Wright, Walk on the Wild Side (single)
- 2023 Simon Kafka, Inspired By True Events
- 2023 Dan Rodriguez, Vast Nothing
