= Live at the Telluride Bluegrass Festival =

Live album by New Monsoon
- Released: March 15, 2005
- Recorded: June 17, 2004
- Genre: Rock, jazz, world
- Label: Sci Fidelity

New Monsoon chronology
Downstream (album) (2003)	Live at the Telluride; Bluegrass Festival (2005)	The Sound (2005)

Professional ratings
Review scores
Source	Rating
Allmusic	link

Live at the Telluride Bluegrass Festival is the first live album by the San Francisco, California-based band New Monsoon. It was recorded live on June 17, 2004 at the venerable Telluride Bluegrass Festival. It was released on March 15, 2005.

== Track listing ==
1. Mountain Air – 11:37
2. Painted Moon – 9:09
3. Calypso – 8:52
4. Blue Queen – 5:48
5. Daddy Long Legs – 5:59
6. Rock Springs Road – 5:25
7. Velvet Pouch – 8:19
8. Tabla Solo – 2:58
9. Bridge of the Gods – 9:22

== Personnel ==
New Monsoon:

Benjamin Bernstein – bass
Brian Carey – percussion, conga, vocals
Phil Ferlino – keyboards, vocals
Rajiv Parikh – percussion, tabla, vocals
Bo Carper – acoustic guitar, banjo, vocals
Michael Shrieve – percussion
Marty Ylitalo – drums, didjeridu

Clay Brasher – package design, package concept
Cookie Marenco – editing, mastering
