= Tim Newby =

American Writer, historian, and educator (born 1974)

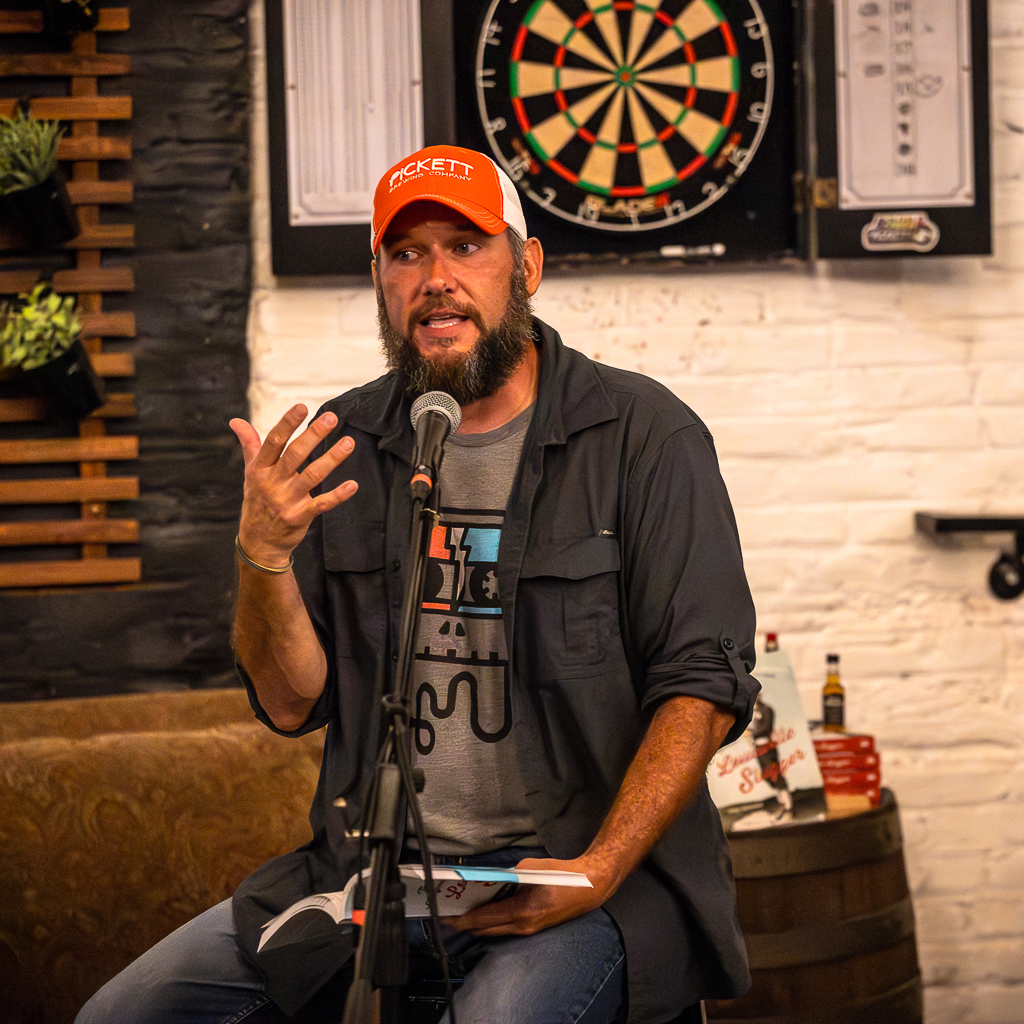
- Newby in 2024
- Born: May 29, 1974 (age 52) Ayer, Massachusetts, U.S.
- Occupation: Educator, writer
- Education: Widener University
- Subjects: music; sports

Timothy Michael Newby (born May 29, 1974) is an American writer and educator. He is the author of three books and his work has appeared in a variety of publications including Bluegrass Unlimited, Paste (magazine), Relix, AmericanaUK, Inside Lacrosse, Society for American Baseball Research, Slide & Banjo, and Honest Tune, where he was the Features Editor. He has been called "one of Baltimore's most beloved historians."

Newby lives in Baltimore, Maryland with his wife and daughter.

== Overview ==
Newby has written three books, 2015's Bluegrass in Baltimore and 2019's Leftover Salmon: Thirty Years of Festival!, and his latest a biography on 19th Century baseball legend Pete Browning, published in Fall 2024 by the University Press of Kentucky. He was also a contributing writer for 2004's The Phish Companion, 2023's One-Win Wonders, and a contributing editor for The 1964 Buffalo Bills: Profiles of the AFL Champions (2025).

Following the release of Bluegrass in Baltimore Newby was featured on the Maryland Morning Radio Show on WYPR in an interview with Tom Hall that examined the unique legacy of Baltimore's rich bluegrass history. The book was hailed as "momentous" by Baltimore (magazine). In November 2016, Bluegrass in Baltimore was awarded a Certificate of Merit from the Association for Recorded Sound Collections for Excellence in Best Research in Recorded Country Music. In January 2017 it was named one of the thirty best books about bluegrass music by About Great Books.

Upon the release of Leftover Salmon: Thirty Years of Festival! in February 2019, Leftover Salmon celebrated its release with a special acoustic tour called the Stories From the Living Room Tour, that featured, "a stripped down version of Leftover Salmon, with a full living room set with lampshades and paintings and all that," as well as a reading from Newby and stories from the band about their thirty years together. In December 2019, the book was named "Best Book of 2019" by Festy GoNuts.

In 2023 Newby co-curated "Ola Belle Reed: I’ve Endured," an exhibition at the Albin O. Kuhn Library Gallery on the campus of the University of Maryland, Baltimore County. The exhibition explored the life and work of nationally recognized Bluegrass musician Ola Belle Reed and contextualized her achievements within a history of migration from rural Appalachia north in the twentieth century. Newby has also appeared in the documentaries Charm City Bluegrass: A Renewed Baltimore Tradition (2018) and I've Endured: The Music and Legacy of Ola Belle Reed (2023).

The Original Louisville Slugger received extremely positive reviews upon release, with Bevis Baseball Research declaring, "Newby has penned one of the best biographies of a 19th century ballplayer ever written. This book is a superlative effort by Newby in which he not only examines Browning’s baseball exploits on the playing field, but more importantly makes the transition from historian to biographer to provide an assessment of the man’s inner character and explore how he coped with the cultural issues of a hearing disability and an alcohol addiction...This biography should receive some consideration in 2025 to be a finalist selection for the prestigious Seymour Medal, to be awarded for the best book on baseball history or biography published in 2024." The release was celebrated with an event at the Louisville Slugger Museum & Factory. The book was announced as a finalist for the Casey Award in November 2024. In March 2025 it was announced as a finalist for the Foreword Indies Book of the Year.

== Bibliography ==
As author

- 2015 – Bluegrass in Baltimore. ISBN 9780786494392
- 2019 – Leftover Salmon: Thirty Years of Festival!. ISBN 1538113295
- 2024 - The Original Louisville Slugger: The Life and Times of Forgotten Baseball Legend Pete Browning. ISBN 198590084X

As contributing writer

- 2004 - The Phish Companion Vol 2. ISBN 9781617134807
- 2024 - One-Win Wonders. ISBN 9781960819130

As contributing editor

- 2025 - The 1964 Buffalo Bills: Profiles of the AFL Champions. ISBN 978-1-4766-8551-9
