= Front Country =

American folk pop band

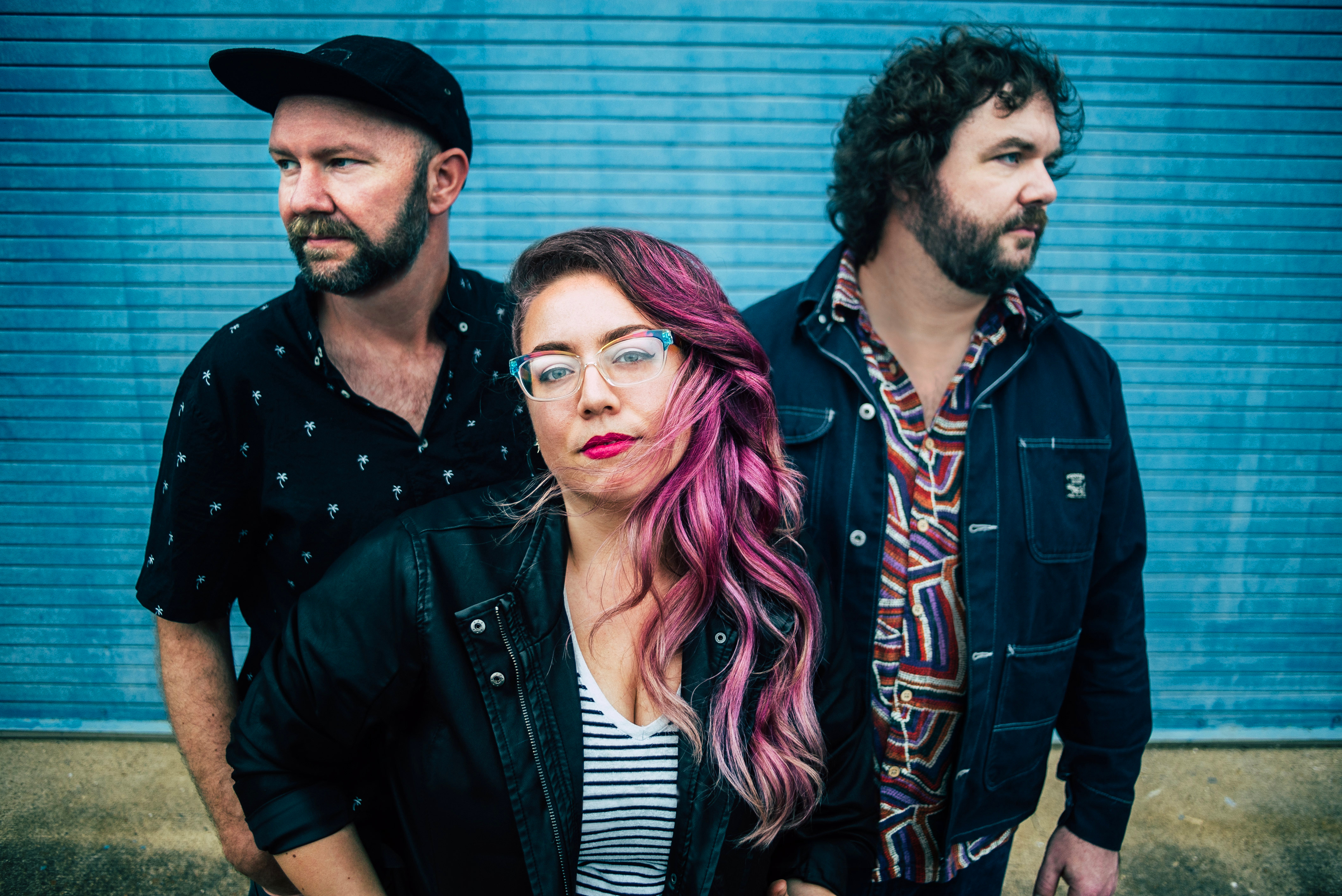
- Front Country in 2020

Background information
- Origin: San Francisco, California
- Genres: Folk pop, Americana
- Years active: 2011–2026
- Labels: Organic Records; Antifragile
- Members: Adam Roszkiewicz; Jacob Groopman; Melody Walker
- Past members: Leif Karlstrom; Jordan Klein; Zach Sharpe
- Website: frontcountryband.com

Front Country was an American folk pop band founded in 2011 in San Francisco, California and subsequently based in Nashville, Tennessee. As of September, 2026, the band's website indicates they are inactive. The band consisted of lead vocalist and songwriter Melody Walker, mandolinist Adam Roszkiewicz, and lead guitarist Jacob Groopman. In a special feature on April 5, 2017, NPR's All Things Considered categorized their music as "String-Band Pop". Wonderland praised their 2020 release Impossible World for "continuing to push the envelope on their sound while staying true to their roots."

== Career ==
The band was initially formed as an acoustic string ensemble in 2011 at a monthly jam at the Atlas Cafe in San Francisco’s Mission District with original members Adam Roszkiewicz (mandolin), Leif Karlstrom (violin), Jacob Groopman (guitar), Melody Walker (vocals), Jordan Klein (banjo) and Zach Sharpe (bass). In 2013 they moved on to play a monthly residency at Mission District bar Amnesia.

In 2012, the band won first place in the RockyGrass Festival Band Competition, and in 2013 they were the winners of the Telluride Bluegrass Festival Band Competition, becoming the third band in history to win both contests.

In 2013, songwriter and lead-vocalist Melody Walker won first place in the Chris Austin Song Contest at MerleFest. She was also named one of "7 Women Smashing the Bluegrass Glass Ceiling" by Paste magazine.

Mandolinist Adam Roszkiewicz was nominated for a Grammy in 2013 for his work with the Modern Mandolin Quartet on their album Americana. He is also a member of the Ger Mandolin Orchestra.

Following the release of their first full-length album Sake of the Sound in the fall of 2014, the band became a full-time national touring act, hiring bassist Jeremy Darrow in 2015.

In 2014, the band appeared on season 3 of nationally syndicated musical television program Music City Roots with their appearance airing throughout 2015 and 2016 on PBS affiliates in the United States.

In 2016, NPR Music named them one of "Nine Artists to Watch For at AmericanaFest".

On April 7, 2017, Front Country released their second full-length album Other Love Songs on Organic Records. The album debuted at #2 on the Billboard Bluegrass Albums Chart.

In an expansion of their previously more acoustic sound, Front Country released their third full-length album Impossible World on October 30, 2020, on indie label Antifragile. The album was named Best of 2020: Indie Roots by Magnet. while Glide Magazine compared the new sound to Cowboy Junkies and Mazzy Star. The album was noted by WMOT and others for being a collection of original "protest songs", and Wonderland lauded Walker's "thought provoking lyricism and messages".

As of September, 2026, the band's website indicates that they are inactive.

== Discography ==
- This Is Front Country EP (2013)
- Sake of the Sound (2014)
- Mixtape EP (2016)
- Other Love Songs (2017)
- Impossible World (2020)
