= The Sound (New Monsoon album) =

Studio album by New Monsoon
- Released: September 6, 2005
- Genre: Rock, jazz, world
- Label: Harmonized
- Producer: Michael Shrieve; Paul Kimble

New Monsoon chronology
Live at the Telluride Bluegrass Festival (2004)	The Sound (2005)	V (2007)

The Sound is the third studio album by the San Francisco, California-based band New Monsoon. It was produced by Michael Shrieve (former drummer for Carlos Santana) and Paul Kimble.

== Track listing ==
1. Journey Man – 5:48
2. Trust In Me – 4:26
3. The Sound – 5:31
4. Sunrise – 0:52
5. Dark Perimeter – 5:12
6. Another Night In Purgatory – 3:56
7. Broken Picture Window – 7:03
8. Rock Springs Road – 5:21
9. Bridge Of The Gods – 8:06
10. Hold On For Now – 4:50
11. Falling Out Of Trees – 2:42

== Personnel ==
New Monsoon:

Jeff Miller - vocals, electric guitars
Benjamin Bernstein - bass
Brian Carey - percussion, conga, timbales
Phil Ferlino - organ, piano, keyboards, vocals
Rajiv Parikh - percussion, tabla, vocals
Bo Carper - acoustic guitar, banjo
Michael Shrieve - percussion
Marty Ylitalo - drums

Steve Armstrong - assistant engineer
Clay Brasher - graphic design
Joe Castwirt - mastering
Jonathan Chi - engineer
Paul Kimble - producer, engineer, mixing, piano, vocals, slide bass
Michael Shrieve - producer
