= Leftover Salmon: Thirty Years of Festival! =

2019 non-fiction book by Tim Newby

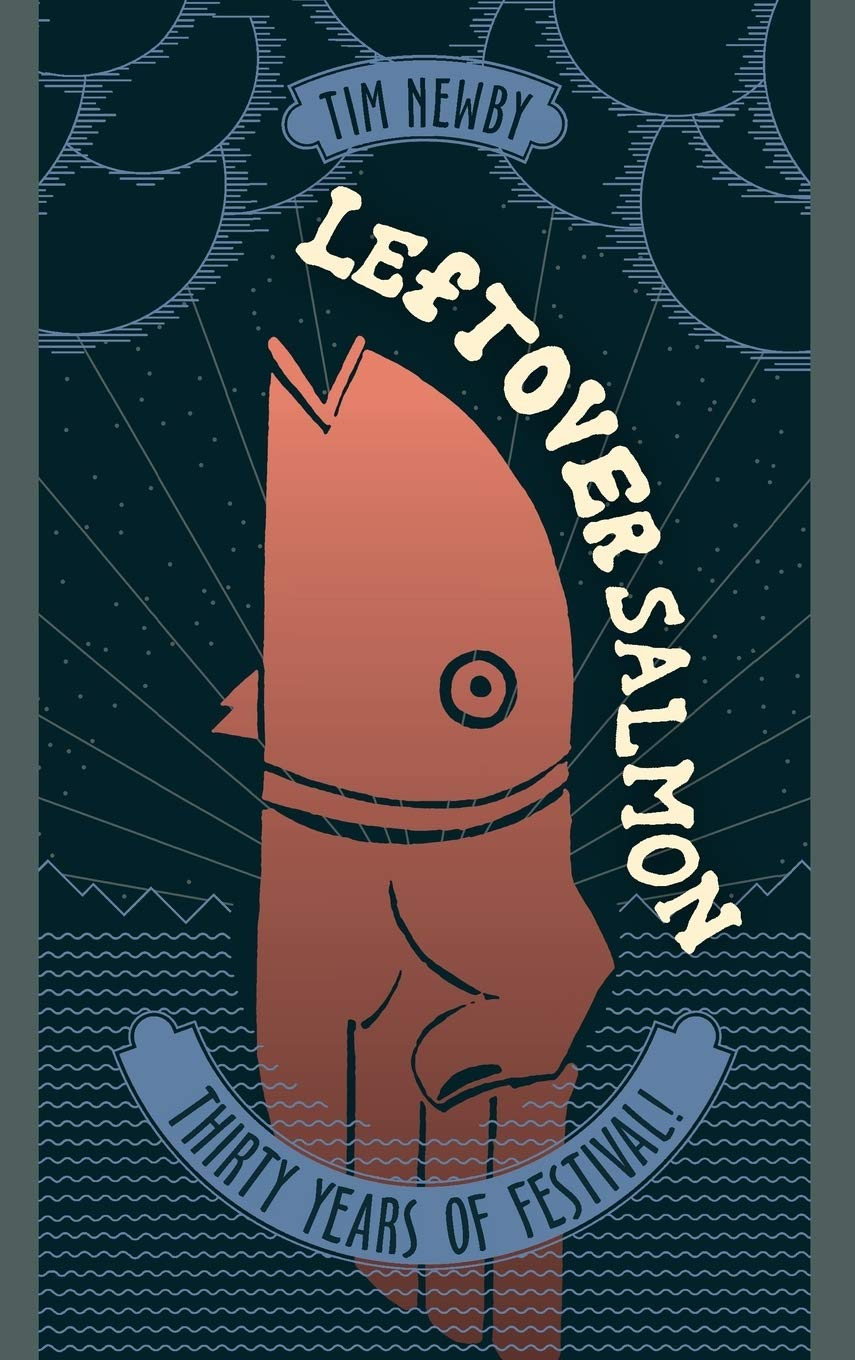
- Author: Tim Newby
- Genre: Non-fiction
- Publisher: Rowman & Littlefield
- Publication date: 2019

Leftover Salmon: Thirty Years of Festival! is a book written by Tim Newby and published by Rowman & Littlefield in 2019.

== Overview ==
Leftover Salmon: Thirty Years of Festival! details the thirty-year history of Leftover Salmon and the influential role they have achieved, despite not always garnering mass recognition. The book is also a wider examination of the Progressive Bluegrass scene in Colorado that Salmon was a key part of, as well as the development of the 1990s Jam band scene and the off-shoot and evolution into jamgrass. Salmon's story is told through the personal recollections of its band members, family, friends, former band-mates, managers, and the musicians they have influenced.

Thirty Years of Festival is the second book by author Tim Newby. His first was 2015's Bluegrass in Baltimore: The Hard Drivin' Sound and its Legacy. Newby is a teacher as well as serving as a writer for various music publications including Paste Magazine, Relix Magazine, Bluegrass Unlimited, and Honest Tune.

The book was released in February 2019 with a special acoustic tour called the Stories From the Living Room Tour, that featured, "a stripped down version of Leftover Salmon, with a full living room set with lampshades and paintings and all that.” In between songs the band told stories from their thirty years together.

In December 2019, the book was named "Best Book of 2019" by Festy GoNuts.

== Reviews ==
The book was received with mostly positive reviews from music critics. Westword described it as "an intimate portrait of the Boulder-hatched jamgrass pioneers" and noted that "Newby has done his homework." Library Journal called Thirty Years of Festival "manna for jam band fans" and the Aspen Times called the book "a meticulous piece of reporting... and a well-argued piece of long-form music criticism that delineates the band's widespread influence on a generation of bluegrass, acoustic and jam bands." The Bluegrass Situation compliments Newby's "deftly treading the line between historian and hardcore fan" and The Bend Bulletin called the book "a meticulous history of the band, from its formation out of the ashes of Salmon Heads and the Left Hand String Band, to the death of banjo player Mark Vann in 2002 and the band’s subsequent hiatus and regrouping." British publication Americana UK described Leftover Salmon: Thirty Years of Festival! as "a real revelation; a window into a different and quite fascinating world."

== See also ==
- Music of Colorado
- List of jam bands
