= Run Boy Run (band) =

Progressive bluegrass band

- Origin: Tucson, Arizona, United States
- Genres: Progressive bluegrass, Americana, acoustic
- Years active: 2009-present
- Members: Matt Rolland; Grace Rolland; Jennifer Sandoval; Bekah Sandoval Rolland
- Past members: Jesse Allen
- Website: Official website

Run Boy Run is a progressive bluegrass and Americana band from Tucson, Arizona. Known for their blend of old-time bluegrass, folk, and classical music as well as for their focus on three-part harmonies, the band first rose to national attention following appearances on Garrison Keillor's A Prairie Home Companion in 2013. Since their 2009 inception, Run Boy Run has garnered a number of accolades, including winning placements at the Telluride Bluegrass Festival and Flagstaff's Pickin' in the Pines.

The quartet is composed of two sets of siblings: Matt and Grace Rolland, and Jennifer Sandoval and Bekah Sandoval Rolland. Matt and Bekah are spouses. They release their music on their own independent imprint, Sky Island Records.

== History ==
Well before the band's formation, the Rolland and Sandoval families had known each other as teenagers as they had often appeared at the same festivals as one another. Each of them went on to attend the University of Arizona in their twenties, where they met bassist Jesse Allen after he had asked to join in on an impromptu jam session. They formally came together under the Run Boy Run moniker in 2009, winning the Pickin' in the Pines Festival band contest mere weeks after their inception.

Two years later, the quintet won the Telluride Bluegrass Festival band contest, joining a winner's list that includes Nickel Creek and the Dixie Chicks. This enabled them to record their self-titled first EP that same year, in spite of their members being split between Phoenix and Tucson. They came together to continue performing at festivals during this time, including Country Thunder and the Ogden Friends of Acoustic Music Festival.

On January 19, 2013, American Public Media's A Prairie Home Companion was broadcast live from Phoenix. Looking for a local act, Run Boy Run was enlisted. Their music and harmonies enchanted Garrison Keillor to the point where he commented on air that they needed to be on the show again. Four weeks later, the band flew to Saint Paul, Minnesota to broadcast with Keillor live from the Fitzgerald Theater for a February 16, 2013 show. Following their appearances on the show, Run Boy Run was susceptible to what fans of the program call the "Prairie effect." In an interview with Standard-Examiner, Matt said, "So many people came to our website that it crashed — that was one of the most exciting things to happen to us."

Keillor went on to write a portion of the liner notes for the band's first full-length release, So Sang the Whippoorwill, released less than a month after their last Prairie Home appearance on March 19. Once again praising Run Boy Run for their harmonies, he said, "I hope they go on forever." Billed as "Arizona meets Appalachia" by the Columbia Daily Tribune, the album went on to earn the sixty-sixth spot on Folk DJ's top albums of May 2013. It was recorded at Jim Brady Recording Studios and funded by fans during a successful Kickstarter campaign.

Run Boy Run released another full-length album, Something to Someone, in 2014. Their subsequent 2016 EP, I Would Fly, features three original songs that were written by the band, as well as a cover of the Carter Family song, "Hello Stranger". I Would Fly marks the first release from the band since Allen's departure that same year. Allen left Run Boy Run in January 2016 to pursue his solo project, Bitters McAllen, which culminated into the release of a solo work entitled Spirits Kill Past. Although the band has yet to release new material, they still get together for live performances, having, for instance, debuted the Temple Emanu-El's ongoing "Music at Emanu-El" concert series to cap off a 2017 summer tour.

In 2018, Bekah released a solo album entitled Seed & Silo under the name Rebekah Rolland, which was co-produced by her and Matt. It was written during a summer stay in Beatrice, Nebraska, where she developed its songs at the Homestead National Monument on behalf of the National Park Service's Centennial. The album has since gone on to garner national praise from publications such as PopMatters, which named it as the third best folk album of 2018. Grace has also developed a solo-collaborative project called Rising Sun Daughter, which embraces acoustic and electric influences. Outside of his work with Run Boy Run and Bekah, Matt plays fiddle with several Arizonan artists such as Freddy Parish and the Old Town String Band and P.D. Ronstadt & the Company.

== Members ==
=== Current members ===
- Matt Rolland - fiddle and guitar
- Grace Rolland - cello and vocals
- Jen Sandoval - mandolin, guitar, octave mandolin, and vocals
- Bekah Sandoval Rolland - fiddle, guitar, and vocals

=== Former Members ===
- Jesse Allen - upright bass

== Discography ==
=== Studio albums ===
Title	Album details
Run Boy Run	Release date: September 15, 2011; Label: Sky Island Records
So Sang the Whippoorwill	Release date: March 19, 2013; Label: Sky Island Records
Something to Someone	Release date: October 28, 2014; Label: Sky Island Records
I Would Fly	Release Date: September 2, 2016; Label: Sky Island Records

== Awards and nominations ==
- 2009 Pickin' in the Pines Band Contest winners
- 2011 Telluride Bluegrass Festival Band Contest winners
