= Vince Herman =

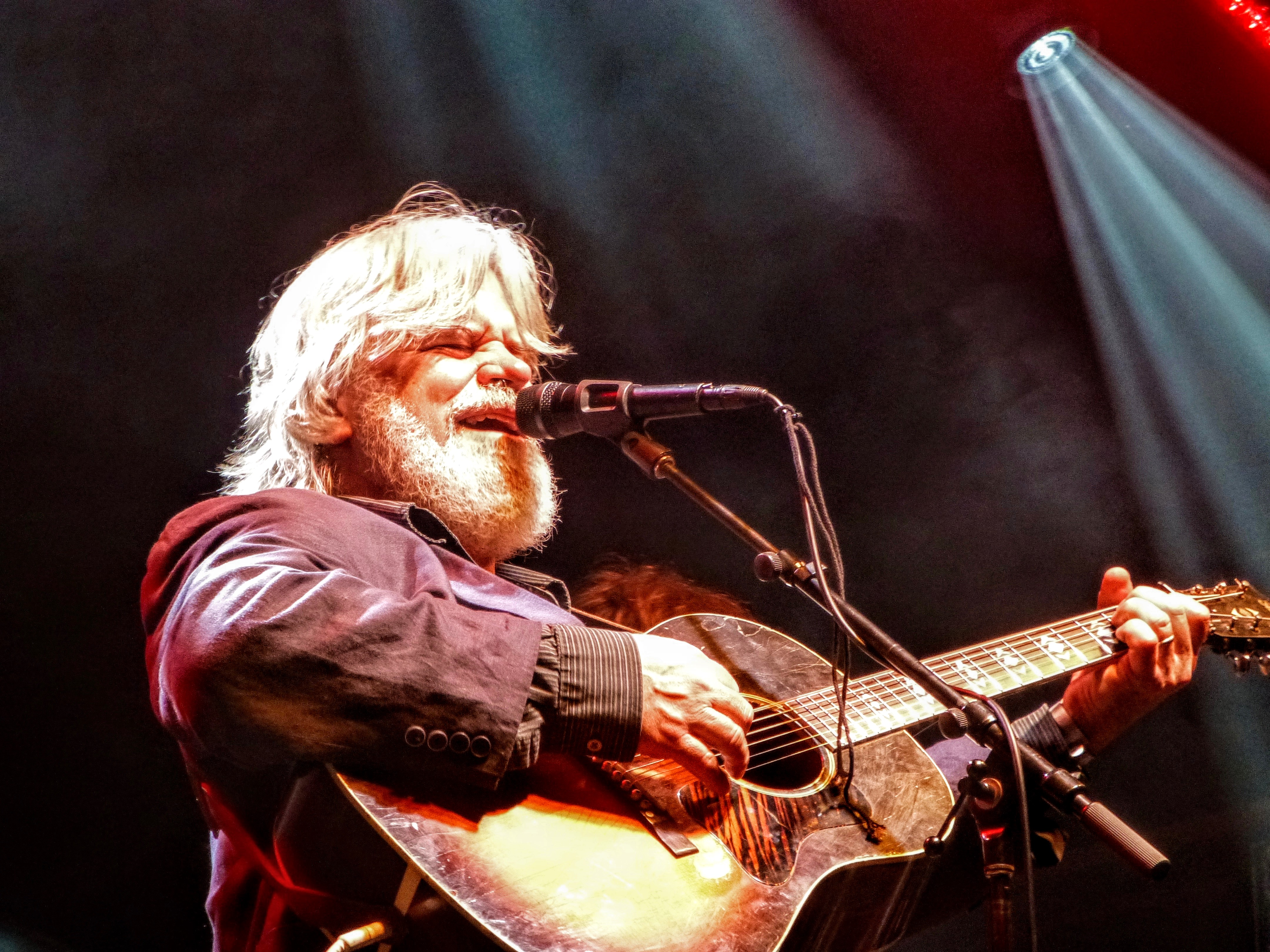

Background information
- Born
- Genres: Progressive bluegrass Jam band
- Instrument: Guitar
- Years active: 1989–present
- Member of: Leftover Salmon; High Hawks
- Formerly of: Great American Taxi; Salmon Heads
- Website: vinceherman.com

Vince Herman is a bluegrass guitarist and singer-songwriter, best known for being one of the founding members of the band Leftover Salmon.

== Biography ==
Herman began playing guitar as a child. He discovered David Bromberg & his Big Band while in ninth grade and says it was at that point he knew music was what he wanted to do with his life. He played his first professional gigs in the eleventh grade with local band Eddie and the Night Riders. Herman went to West Virginia University for college and began his music education by playing in a number of bands. He learned from bluegrass legends like Melvin Wine, Mose Coffman, J.P. Fraley and Dewey Balfa.

After college, Herman moved to Colorado and met future bandmate Drew Emmitt. Over the next few years, Emmitt continued to play with the Left Hand String Band and Herman formed the Salmon Heads. The two formed Leftover Salmon a few years later, in 1989, when they combined Emmitt’s newgrass inspired Left Hand String Band and Herman’s Cajun-jugband Salmon Heads. Over the next 16 years, Leftover Salmon toured extensively, was part of the jamband scene, and played at the influential H.O.R.D.E festivals. The band went on hiatus in 2005 and Herman formed Great American Taxi, who released their debut album, Streets of Gold, in 2007. Great American Taxi toured extensively and released two more albums, 2009's Reckless Habits and 2011's Paradise Lost. Herman played with Great American Taxi until 2013, while Leftover Salmon returned from hiatus in 2007.

In 2019, he formed the super-group High Hawks with keyboardist Chad Staehly (Hard Working Americans, Great American Taxi), guitarist Adam Greuel (Horseshoes & Handgrenades), bassist Brian Adams (Great American Taxi), drummer Will Trask (Great American Taxi), and fiddler Tim Carbone (Railroad Earth). The band released a self-titled debut album in 2021.

Herman released his first solo album, Enjoy the Ride, in 2022.

== Discography ==
=== Leftover Salmon ===
see Leftover Salmon

=== Great American Taxi ===
Year	Title	Label
2007	Streets of Gold	-
2009	Reckless Habits	-
2011	Paradise Lost	-

=== High Hawks ===
Year	Title	Label
2021	The High Hawks	LoHi Records

=== Solo ===
Year	Title	Label
2022	Enjoy the Ride	LoHi Records
