= Hydrophonic (New Monsoon album) =

Studio album by New Monsoon
- Released: 2001
- Genre: Rock, jazz, world

New Monsoon chronology
Hydrophonic (2001)	Downstream (2003)

Hydrophonic is the first studio album by the San Francisco, California, based band New Monsoon.

== Track listing ==
1. On The Sun
2. Drivewheel
3. Before I Begin
4. African Rain
5. Country Interlude
6. Lucky Hour
7. Wagon Train
8. Cypress
9. Mean Poem
10. Vickassippi
11. Transgression

== Personnel ==
New Monsoon:

Brian Carey – percussion, conga, timbales
Heath Carlisle – bass, guitar, vocals, cover art
Phil Ferlino – organ, piano, keyboards
Rajiv Parikh – percussion, tabla, vocals
Bo Carper – acoustic guitar, banjo, dobro
Jeff Miller – guitar (electric), vocals (background)
Marty Ylitalo – drums, didjeridu
