= The Phish Companion =

Book by the Mockingbird Foundation

- First edition
- Author: Mockingbird Foundation
- Language: English
- Series: The Phish Companion
- Subject: Biography, History, Reference
- Publisher: Mockingbird Foundation
- Publication date: 2000
- Publication place: United States
- Media type: Hardcover
- Pages: 915
- ISBN: 978-0-8793063-1-1
- Dewey Decimal: 782.42166/092/2 21

The Phish Companion is an encyclopedia about the band Phish. Three editions have been published: A first in 2000 by Miller Freeman, a second in 2004 (around the time of Phish's "breakup") by Backbeat Books (which bought Miller Freeman and was subsequently bought by Hal Leonard), and a third edition self-published in 2016.

The Companion is produced by fans of the band, on a volunteer-basis and for charity, under the auspices of the nonprofit Mockingbird Foundation. Content has, in one edition or another, included song histories, setlists, reviews, statistics, essays, poetry, guest and sideshow info, an index of lyrics, interviews, and more. Proceeds - of which $1.9M has already been disbursed through 493 grants - benefit music education for children. Created completely by fans, it is the authoritative guide to Phish.

The third edition of The Phish Companion: A Guide to the Band & Their Music is a hard-bound, 898-page, full-color revision containing setlists, song histories, and charts; hundreds of show reviews and fan stories; and 128 pages of Phish photography – most of which has never been published.
