= Leftover Salmon =

American jam band

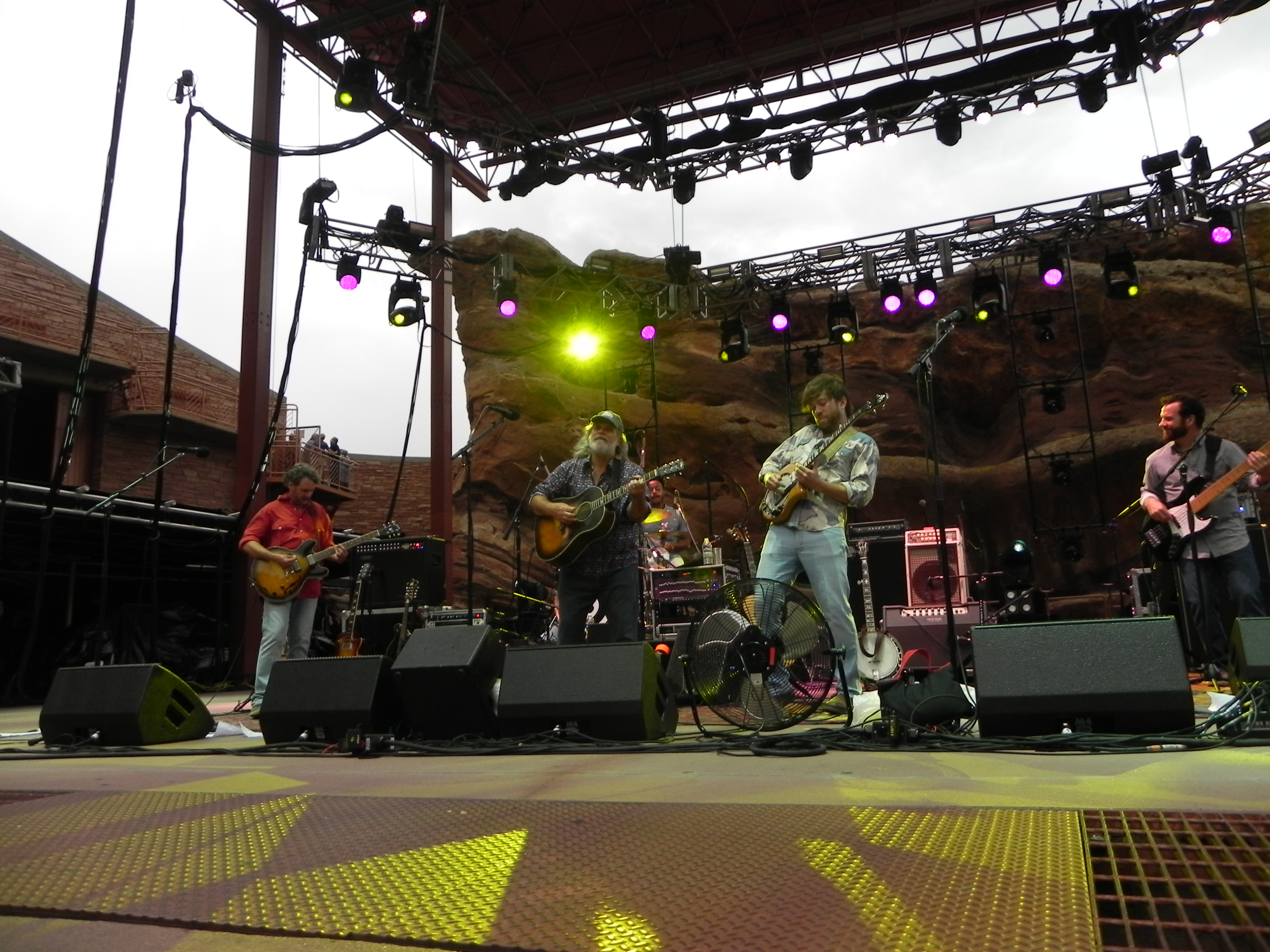
- Leftover Salmon at Red Rocks 2016

Background information
- Origin: Boulder, Colorado, U.S.
- Genres: Cajun; progressive bluegrass; jam band
- Years active: 1989–present
- Labels: Hollywood, Compass, Compendia, Los Records, Whirled Beats
- Members: Vince Herman; Drew Emmitt; Greg Garrison; Andy Thorn; Alwyn Robinson; Jay Starling
- Past members: Mark Vann; Erik Deutsch; Bill McKay; Rob Galloway; Michael Wooten; Gerry Cavagnaro; Glenn Keefe; Joe Jogerst; David Dorian; Jose Martinez; Tye North; Jeff Sipe; Noam Pikelny; Matt Flinner; Bill Payne
- Website: leftoversalmon.com

Leftover Salmon is an American jam band from Boulder, Colorado, formed in 1989. The band's music is a blend of bluegrass, rock, country, and Cajun/Zydeco (Polyethnic Slamgrass). Over their thirty years as a band, Salmon has released seven studio albums and three live albums. The band celebrated their continuing thirty-year career with the release of the biographical book, Leftover Salmon: Thirty Years of Festival! and a vinyl box-set re-release of all of their studio albums.

== History ==
The band formed in 1989 when members of the Salmon Heads (Vince Herman, Dave Dorian, and Gerry Cavagnaro) combined with members of the Left Hand String Band (Drew Emmitt and Glenn Keefe) to play a New Year's Eve show in 1989 at the Eldo in Crested Butte, Colorado. Herman had previously played with Emmitt in the Left Hand String Band and had called on his former bandmates Emmitt and Keefe to fill in for some missing members of the Salmon Heads for the New Year's Eve show. They chose the name Leftover Salmon on the drive to the show.

The synergy worked and the result was Leftover Salmon. The lineup changed significantly over the years, but the "Big Three" – Drew Emmitt, Vince Herman, and Mark Vann — remained the heart of the band until Vann's death in 2002.

After the independent release of Bridges to Bert in 1992 and the 1995 live follow-up Ask the Fish, Leftover Salmon gained a spot on the H.O.R.D.E. festival tour and a contract with Hollywood Records. Their Hollywood debut and second studio album, Euphoria with guest keyboardist Pete Sears, continued to define their eclectic sound and introduced many songs that became their most notable. They released four albums with the Disney Music Group-owned label. In 1999, Nashville Sessions was released, with guests Waylon Jennings, Jerry Douglas, Lucinda Williams, John Bell, Del McCoury, Ronnie McCoury, Béla Fleck, Sam Bush, John Cowan, Todd Park Mohr, Earl Scruggs, Randy Scruggs, Jeff Hanna, Sally Van Meter, Jeff Coffin, Jo-El Sonnier, Taj Mahal, Danny Boone and Reese Wynans. In 2000, Bill McKay, formerly of The Derek Trucks Band, joined the band on keyboards and vocals and the band recorded several of his songs. He remained with the band until late 2011.

In March 2002, founding member and banjoist Mark Vann died from cancer. He was succeeded by Matt Flinner and then Noam Pikelny.

In 2003, the band teamed up with David Lowery and Johnny Hickman of Cracker (and formerly Camper Van Beethoven) to release the critically acclaimed 10-song album, "O' Cracker Where Art Thou?" (Pitch a Tent), 2003, which was a compilation of ten of Cracker's best songs done Leftover Salmon style.

In 2004, the band announced they were going on hiatus at the end of that year.

An award-nominated documentary film of Leftover Salmon, titled Years in Your Ears, was released on DVD in November 2006.

Leftover Salmon reunited in 2007 and played six performances, including the High Sierra Music Festival in Quincy, California, the All Good Festival in West Virginia, as well as Denver and Boulder, Colorado shows in late December. Leftover Salmon marked their unofficial return to the stage with a performance at the Telluride Bluegrass Festival on Sunday, June 24, 2007, as "Drew Emmitt and Vince Herman and Friends." They were introduced by Jeff Austin of Yonder Mountain String Band with the line, "We know what it might say in the program, but I think we all really know what's going on here."

Despite their various successful side projects, Leftover Salmon played seven times during the summer of 2008 and 2009. For a special New Years run, the band celebrated 20 years as a band by returning to the site of their first show in Crested Butte, Colorado: The Eldo. The band played four shows through Denver and Boulder during this run while celebrating their 20th anniversary. Since moving Andy Thorn into the banjo role, the band has been touring more than usual with small runs throughout the country.

On May 22, 2012, the band released their first album since their hiatus. The album was called Aquatic Hitchhiker. An extensive promotional tour followed including the Summer Camp Music Festival and the Telluride Bluegrass Festival.

Starting on June 19, 2012, the band is the featured "house band" at the Whales Tail Bar in Breckenridge, Colorado, on the After the Catch episodes of Deadliest Catch.

In 2014, they released the studio album High Country and the following year released a compilation double album of live performances with the title 25. They released their next studio album, Something Higher, in 2018.

As the band neared their 30th anniversary they were profiled in the book Leftover Salmon: Thirty Years of Festival! by author Tim Newby. The book chronicled the band's long influential history and their role in the development of the jam band and jamgrass scenes. In 2019, keyboardist Erik Deutsch left the group to join The Chicks.

== Band members ==
=== Current members ===
- Vince Herman – vocals, guitar, washboard (1989–present)
- Drew Emmitt – vocals, mandolin, fiddle, electric guitar (1989–present)
- Greg Garrison – bass, vocals (2000–present)
- Andy Thorn – banjo, electric banjo, vocals (2010–present)
- Alwyn Robinson – drums, vocals (2013–present)
- Jay Starling - keyboards, dobro (2022–present)

=== Former members ===
- Mark Vann – banjo, electric banjo (1989–2002) (died 2002)
- Glenn Keefe – bass (1989–1992)
- Gerry Cavagnaro - accordion, concertina, harmonica (1989–1991)
- Dave Dorian - drums (1989–1990)
- Josey Wales - drums (1990–1991)
- Michael Wooten – drums (1991–1997)
- Joe Jogerst – keyboards (1992–1994)
- Rob Galloway - bass (1992–1993)
- Chris Engleman - bass (1993)
- Tye North – bass (1993–2000)
- Jeff Sipe – drums (1997–2000, 2007–2010)
- Bill McKay – keyboards, vocals (2000–2011)
- Jose Martinez – drums (2000–2004, 2009–2013)
- Matt Flinner – banjo (2002, 2004, 2011)
- Noam Pikelny – banjo, electric banjo (2002–2010)
- Bill Payne – keyboards, vocals (2014-2015)
- Erik Deutsch – keyboards (2016–2020)

Featured artists

- Danny Boone, featured in The Nashville Sessions
- Waylon Jennings
- Randy Scruggs

== Selective discography ==
=== Albums ===
==== Leftover Salmon ====
Year	Title	Label
1992	Bridges to Bert	Whirled Beets
1995	Ask the Fish	Bert
1997	Euphoria	Hollywood
1999	The Nashville Sessions	Hollywood
2002	Live	Compass Records
2004	Leftover Salmon	Compendia
2012	Aquatic Hitchhiker	Los Records
2014	High Country	Los Records
2015	25	Los Records
2018	Something Higher	Los Records
2021	Brand New Good Old Days	Compass Records
2023	Grass Roots	Compass Records
2025	Let’s Party About It	Compass Records

==== Collaboration ====
- O' Cracker Where Art Thou? (Pitch a Tent), 2003 (with Cracker)

=== Videos ===
- Years In Your Ears ...a Story of Leftover Salmon (2006, DVD)
