= Caleb Stine =

American singer-songwriter

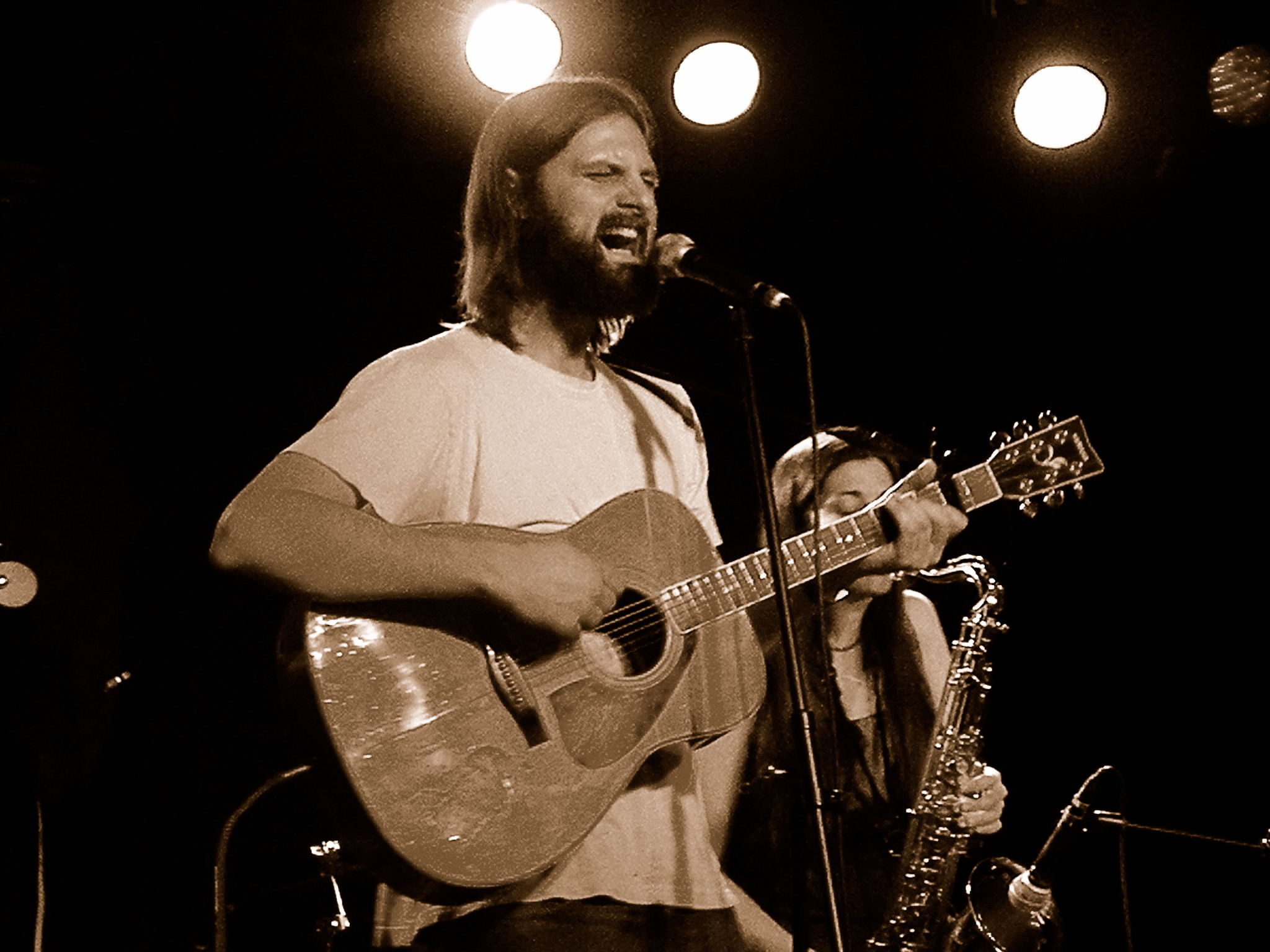
- Caleb Stine live 2010

Background information
- Origin: Baltimore, Md
- Genres: Americana; Folk; Country
- Years active: 2006–present
- Website: Official website

Caleb Stine is an American singer/songwriter from Baltimore, Maryland. He plays both solo and with Americana-rockers The Brakemen. His style and intensely personal lyrics has evoked comparisons to Townes Van Zandt, Kris Kristofferson, and Harvest-era Neil Young.

== History ==
Stine was raised in Colorado, where he started playing guitar when he was twelve. Shortly after, he began playing regular open-mic shows at local coffee houses where he developed his confessional style. He eventually relocated to Baltimore and became a part of its widely divergent scene. His first two albums, 2006's October 29 and 2008's I'll Head West Again, were with the Brakemen, and highlighted a style The New Yorker called "appropriately trainlike—steady and powerful."

His third album, Outgrown These Walls was a collaboration. Paired with rapper Saleem by DJ Sam Sessa from influential radio station WTMD, and challenged to come up with four songs, the pair who had never met, clicked immediately and created an album's worth of material that the Baltimore Sun hailed as "truly compelling." The dark and brooding track "Baltimore" was used by CNN in a piece on prescription drug-abuse in Baltimore in 2010. Outgrown These Walls was followed in 2009 by Eyes So Strong and Clean, and marked the songwriter's first solo album.

Stine released I Wasn't Built For a Life Like This September 25, 2010. The all-acoustic album continues what Stine calls "his exploration in an evolving and eroding America." Upon its release No Depression declared "His honest stories and thoughtful poetry places Caleb among some of the best songwriters of this time and could possibly make him the 21st Century's Townes Van Zandt."

In 2011, following the release of I Wasn't Built For a Life Like This, Stine appeared in the off-Broadway production of Woody Guthrie Dreams. Stine played the role of Cisco Houston as well as serving as the production's musical director.

Stine released Maybe God Is Lonely Too, in 2014. The Baltimore City Paper says the album, "houses Americana-tinged songs about death, falling in love, the prison-industrial complex, institutionalized racism, wanting a dog, and the empowering voice of God...it is ultimately a gritty, tricky record that answers to nobody."

In 2015 Stine released Time I Let It Go with his band the Brakemen. This was followed by a solo album, Moon, in 2018.

His latest album Mystic Country was released in 2019. Slide & Banjo called it, "An album that will stir thought, creativity, discussion, and inspiration."

== Discography ==
- October 29th - 2006
- I'll Head West Again - 2008
- Outgrown These Walls - 2008
- Eyes So Strong And Clean - 2009
- I Wasn't Built For a Life Like This - 2010
- The Fall of the Rebel Angel - 2012
- Maybe God is Lonely Too - 2014
- Time I Let It Go - 2015
- Moon - 2018
- Mystic Country - 2019
- Life and Times of Handyman - 2021
- Outlaw In Your Mind - 2022
