= Drew Emmitt =

American musician

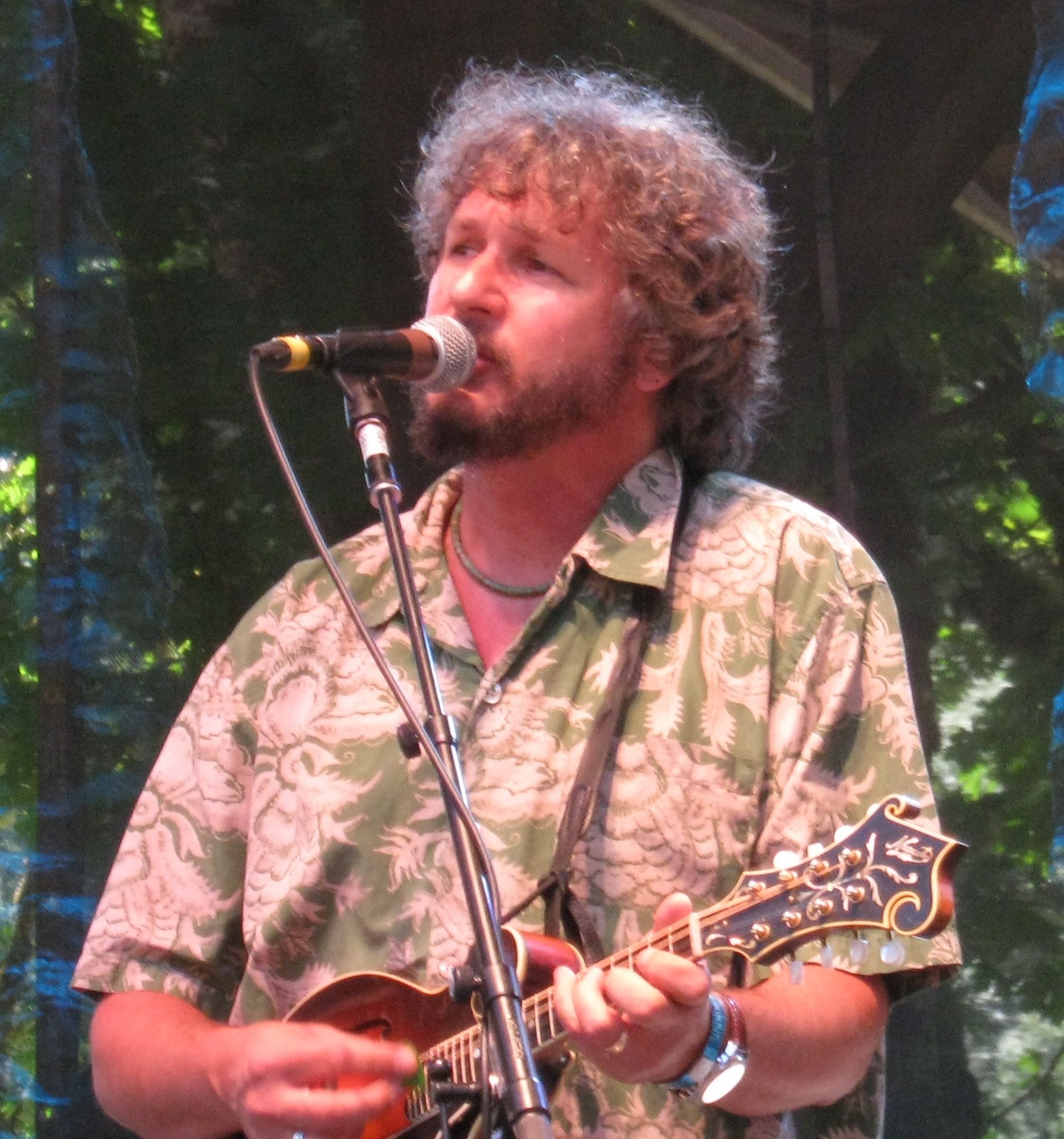
- Drew Emmitt on stage at the Northwest String Summit on July 21, 2013.

Background information
- Genres: Progressive bluegrass, jam band
- Instruments: Mandolin, Guitar, violin, flute
- Years active: 1989–present
- Label: Compass Records
- Website: web.archive.org/web/20080905135147/http://www.drewemmitt.com/

Drew Emmitt is an American mandolinist, guitarist, fiddle player, occasional flutist, and singer, best known for being one of the founding members of Leftover Salmon, as well as being the frontman of the Left Hand String Band, Drew Emmitt Band, and the Emmitt-Nershi Band.

== Bio ==
Drew Emmitt is from Nashville, and later settled in Boulder. He enrolled at the University of Colorado after completing high school. In 1984, he took the initiative to create a bluegrass ensemble named the Left Hand String Band, inspired by a local area in Colorado.

=== 1989–present: Leftover Salmon ===
In 1990, he joined forces with Vince Herman to form the acclaimed jam band, Leftover Salmon, which quickly gained popularity as a dynamic live act.

Renowned for his lightning-fast mandolin playing style, Emmit has collaborated with a diverse range of musicians, including the likes of Peter Rowan, John Cowan, and even Neil Young. In April 2002, he took a solo venture and released his debut album, "Freedom Ride," under the label Compass Records.

=== 2005–present: Side projects ===
At the start of the band's deformation, Emmitt formed the Drew Emmitt Band.

In 2007, Emmitt and Bill Nershi of The String Cheese Incident and Honkytonk Homeslice started a project dubbed the Emmitt-Nershi Band. The band toured a small amount in the fall of 2007, and had a wide-scale tour planned for the duration of that year, including stops at festivals such as the High Sierra Music Festival.

== Personal life ==
Emmitt lives in Crested Butte, Co.

== Discography ==
=== Solo ===
Year	Title	Label
2002	Freedom Ride	Compass Records
2005	Across the Bridge	Compass Records
2008	Long Road	Compass Records

=== Leftover Salmon ===
Year	Title	Label
1993	Bridges to Bert	-
1995	Ask the Fish	-
1997	Euphoria	Hollywood Records
1999	The Nashville Sessions	Hollywood Records
2002	Live	Compass Records
2004	Leftover Salmon	Compendia Records
2012	Aquatic Hitchhiker	

=== Left Hand String Band ===
Year	Title	Label
1991	Get Me Outta This City	Brewglass Records
