= Bluegrass in Baltimore =

2015 book by Tim Newby

- Author: Tim Newby
- Language: English
- Genre: Non-fiction
- Publisher: McFarland & Company
- Publication date: 2015
- Publication place: United States

Bluegrass in Baltimore: The Hard Drivin' Sound and its Legacy is a book written by Tim Newby and published by McFarland & Company in 2015. It was released in June 2015. It had its formal release August 2, 2015 at the Creative Alliance in Baltimore, Maryland.

== Overview ==
Bluegrass in Baltimore looks in detail at the highly-influential scene in Baltimore that contributed to the success of Del McCoury, Earl Taylor, Walt Hensley, Alice Gerrard, Hazel Dickens, Mike Seeger, and Mike Munford and explores the impact the music they made had on a wide range of other musicians including Jerry Garcia, Jorma Kaukonen, Pete Wernick, Sam Bush and Chris Hillman.

Author Tim Newby is a teacher as well as serving as a writer for various music publications including Paste Magazine, Relix Magazine and Honest Tune, where he is a features editor. Following the release of Bluegrass in Baltimore Newby was featured on the Maryland Morning Radio Show on WYPR in an interview with Tom Hall that examined the unique legacy of Baltimore's rich bluegrass history. Newby was also featured on the Bluegrass Byway podcast out of Nashville in an in-depth interview about the book.

Honest Tune Magazine featured an excerpt of the book following its release in June 2015.

In November 2016, the book was awarded a Certificate of Merit from the Association for Recorded Sound Collections for excellence in Best Research in Recorded Country Music. In January 2017 it was named one of the thirty best books about bluegrass music by About Great Books.

== Reviews ==
- Baltimore Magazine, October 2015: "Newby's work is momentous as it is the first compendium to examine this deeply rooted tradition."
- Live for Live Music, October 1, 2015: "The work takes an in-depth look at the way bluegrass and Baltimore's histories coincided, as musicians relied on Americana music to bring people together during the tough, post-War times."
- Baltimore Guide, October 7, 2015: "When you think of the Baltimore music scene, the folksy, Americana melodies of bluegrass might be the last thing that comes to mind. However, Baltimore really did act as a crucial and influential epicenter for this growing music scene. The book, Bluegrass in Baltimore: The Hard Drivin' Sound and its Legacy, by Tim Newby, analyzes and brings to light this rich and hidden history."
- Baltimore City Paper, October 21, 2015: "Easy-to-read journalism, this book takes a broader view of Maryland's string-band scene, both urban and rural, both past and present...Bluegrass in Baltimore: The Hard Drivin' Sound and its Legacy tell[s] those stories in far more detail than they've ever been told in print before."
- Bluegrass Unlimited, December 1, 2015: "Tim Newby has done a good job of documenting Baltimore’s rich bluegrass history. There is plenty of information here along with some highly entertaining stories. Recommended for sure."
- Journal of Southern History, November 2016: "Newby’s book delivers solid contributions to the historiography of bluegrass music, offering a fresh investigation of urban bluegrass in a working-class city. The book effectively expands the biographies of both long-revered artists (Dickens, Gerrard, McCoury, Seeger) and those less recognized (Hensley, Hooper, Taylor). The in-depth profile of Taylor’s career and contextualization of his group’s historic Carnegie Hall concert in 1959 are long overdue. In addition, the chapter on Reed incorporates illuminating discussions of Sunset Park and New River Ranch, two rural parks just outside Baltimore that were critical venues in the early days of bluegrass."
- About Great Books, January 2017: "Author Tim Newby meticulously sculpts the history of the string-band scene in a major industrial city. Newby portrays the essence of Baltimore bluegrass as a melting pot of urban and rural influences. Readers also watch bluegrass’ uphill battle with prejudice against its hillbilly roots."
- Association for Recorded Sound Collections, Fall 2016: "One hopes that there will be future editions, because this is an important book. The level of detail that Tim Newby has reconstructed is very impressive, as is the documentary contribution of his interviews with veterans of the Baltimore bluegrass scene. Bluegrass in Baltimore is a notable contribution to the study of bluegrass music, the folk revival, and the Appalachian diaspora."
- AmericanaUK, October 21, 2021: "Tim Newby paints a colourful picture of an emerging set of folk enthusiasts who are intent on creating an exciting and hard-driving sound."

== See also ==
- History of the Appalachian people in Baltimore
