= Kamiizumi Station =

Railway station in Maebashi, Gunma Prefecture, Japan

Kamiizumi Station 上泉駅
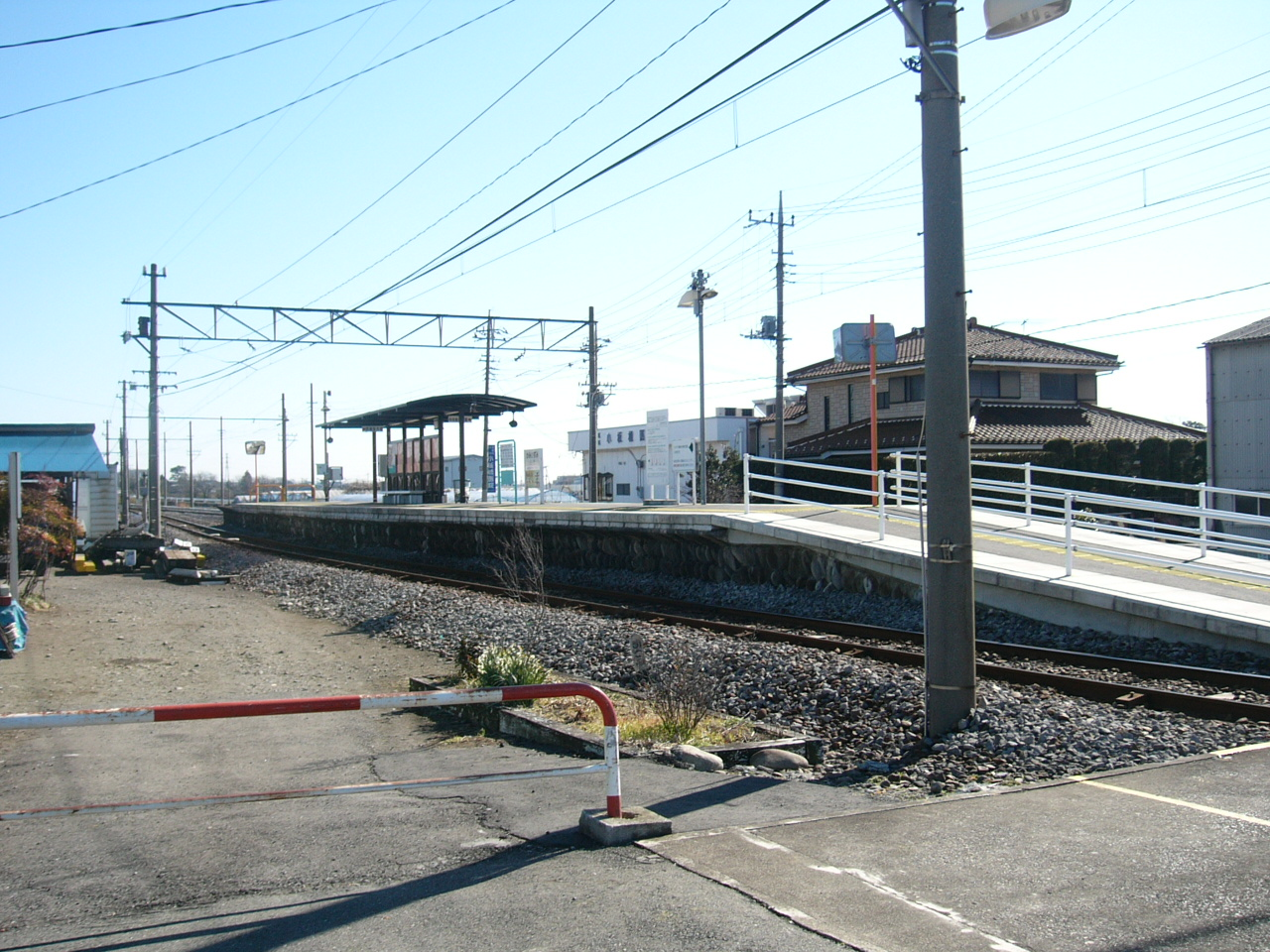
- Kamiizumi Station in February 2004

General information
- Location: Kamiizumimachi 3443-3, Maebashi-shi, Gunma-ken 371-0007; Japan
- Coordinates: 36.3941°N 139.1066°E
- Operator: Jōmō Electric Railway Company
- Line: ■ Jōmō Line
- Distance: 3.2 km from Chūō-Maebashi
- Platforms: 1 island platform

History
- Opened: November 10, 1928

Passengers
- FY2015: 108

Services
Preceding station	Jōmō Electric Railway	Following station
Katakai towards Chūō-Maebashi	Jōmō Line	Akasaka towards Nishi-Kiryū
Location
- Location within Gunma Prefecture Location within Japan

Kamiizumi Station (上泉駅, Kamiizumi-eki) is a passenger railway station in the city of Maebashi, Gunma Prefecture, Japan, operated by the private railway operator Jōmō Electric Railway Company.

== Lines ==
Kamiizumi Station is a station on the Jōmō Line, and is located 3.2 kilometers from the terminus of the line at Chūō-Maebashi.

== Station layout ==
The station consists of a single island platform with a level crossing.

=== Platforms ===
1	■ Jōmō Line	for Akagi and Nishi-Kiryū
2	■ Jōmō Line	for Chūō-Maebashi

== History ==
Kamiizumi Station opened on November 10, 1928.

== Surrounding area ==
- Maebashi Kamiizumi Post Office

== See also ==
- List of railway stations in Japan
