= Zen Station =

Railway station in Maebashi, Gunma Prefecture, Japan

Zen Station 膳駅
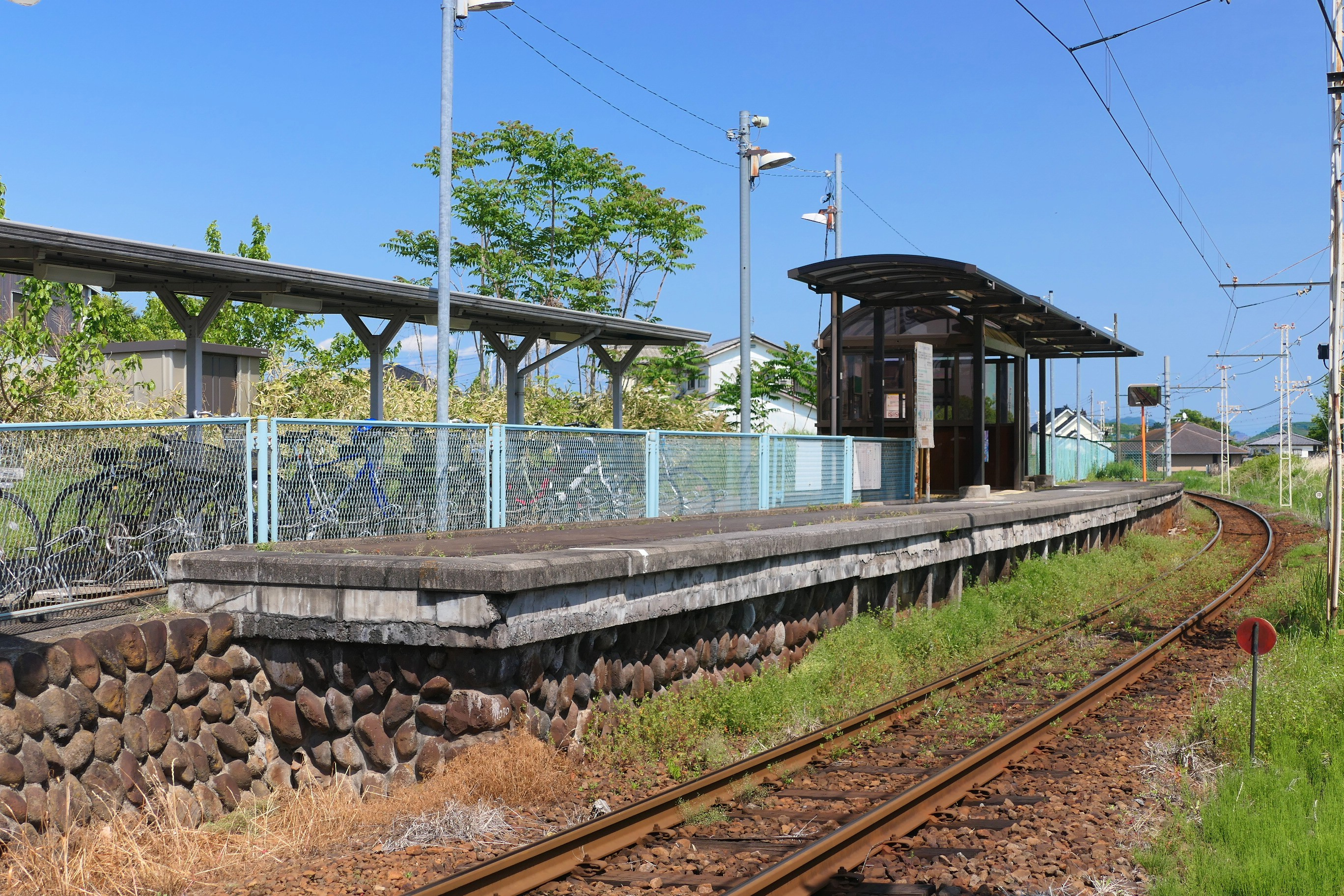
- Zen Station in May 2025

General information
- Location: Kasukawa-cho Zen 568-1, Maebashi-shi, Gunma-ken 371-0204; Japan
- Coordinates: 36.4171°N 139.2219°E
- Operator: Jōmō Electric Railway Company
- Line: ■ Jōmō Line
- Distance: 14.3 km from Chūō-Maebashi
- Platforms: 1 side platform

History
- Opened: November 10, 1928

Passengers
- FY2015: 121

Services
Preceding station	Jōmō Electric Railway	Following station
Kasukawa towards Chūō-Maebashi	Jōmō Line	Niisato towards Nishi-Kiryū
Location
- Location within Gunma Prefecture Location within Japan

Zen Station (膳駅, Zen-eki) is a passenger railway station in the city of Maebashi, Gunma Prefecture, Japan, operated by the private railway operator Jōmō Electric Railway Company.

== Lines ==
Zen Station is a station on the Jōmō Line, and is located 14.3 kilometers from the terminus of the line at Chūō-Maebashi.

== Station layout ==
The station consists of a single side platform serving traffic in both directions. The station is unattended.

=== Platforms ===
1	■ Jōmō Line	for Akagi, Nishi-Kiryū
2	■ Jōmō Line	for Chūō-Maebashi

== History ==
Zen Station was opened on November 10, 1928.

== Surrounding area ==
- Kasukawa Folk Museum
- Chikato Jinja

== See also ==
- List of railway stations in Japan
