= Tennōjuku Station =

Railway station in Kiryū, Gunma Prefecture, Japan

Tennōjuku Station 天王宿駅
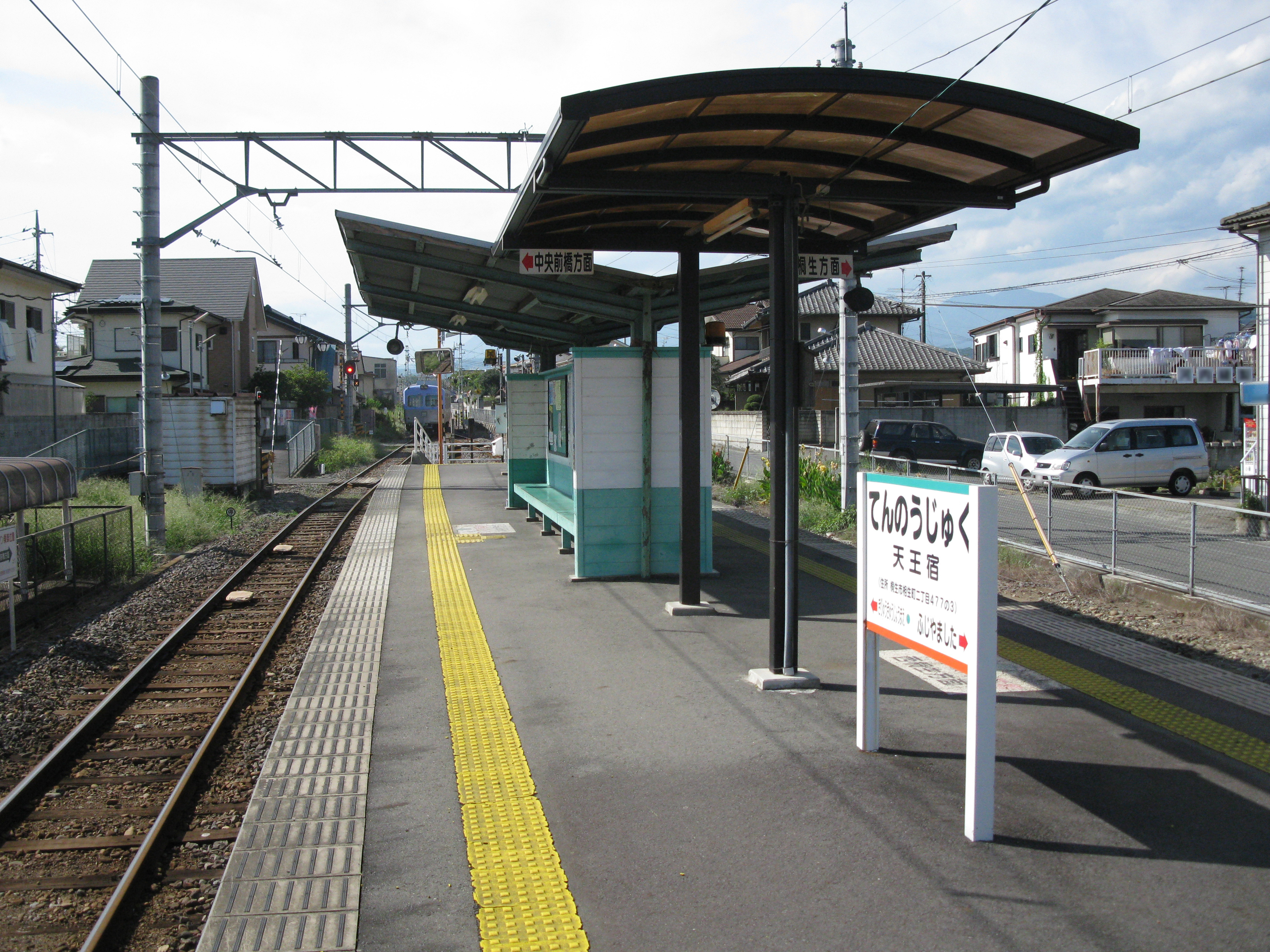
- Tennōjuku Station in September 2010

General information
- Location: Aioi-cho 2-477-3, Kiryū-shi, Gunma-ken 376-0011; Japan
- Coordinates: 36.4149°N 139.3079°E
- Operator: Jōmō Electric Railway Company
- Line: ■ Jōmō Line
- Distance: 22.8 km from Chūō-Maebashi
- Platforms: 1 island platform
- Tracks: 2

Other information
- Status: Unstaffed
- Website: Official website

History
- Opened: March 10, 1938

Passengers
- FY2019: 180

Services
Preceding station	Jōmō Electric Railway	Following station
Kiryū-Kyūjō-Mae towards Chūō-Maebashi	Jōmō Line	Fujiyamashita towards Nishi-Kiryū
Location
- Location within Gunma Prefecture Location within Japan

Tennōjuku Station (天王宿駅, Tennōjuku-eki) is a passenger railway station in the city of Kiryū, Gunma, Japan, operated by the private railway operator Jōmō Electric Railway Company.

== Lines ==
Tennōjuku Station is a station on the Jōmō Line, and is located 22.8 kilometers from the terminus of the line at Chūō-Maebashi .

== Station layout ==
The station has one island platform connected to the station building by a level crossing. The station is unattended.

=== Platforms ===
1	■ Jōmō Line	for Nishi-Kiryū
2	■ Jōmō Line	for Chūō-Maebashi

== History ==
Tennōjuku Station was opened as a signal stop on March 10, 1938. It was later elevated to a full passenger station on December 6, 1957.

== Passenger statistics ==
In fiscal 2019, the station was used by an average of 180 passengers daily (boarding passengers only).

== Surrounding area ==
- Kiryū Aioi Post Office
- Kiryū Meiji-kan (former Aioi village hall)

== See also ==
- List of railway stations in Japan
