= Niisato Station =

Railway station in Kiryū, Gunma Prefecture, Japan

Niisato Station 新里駅
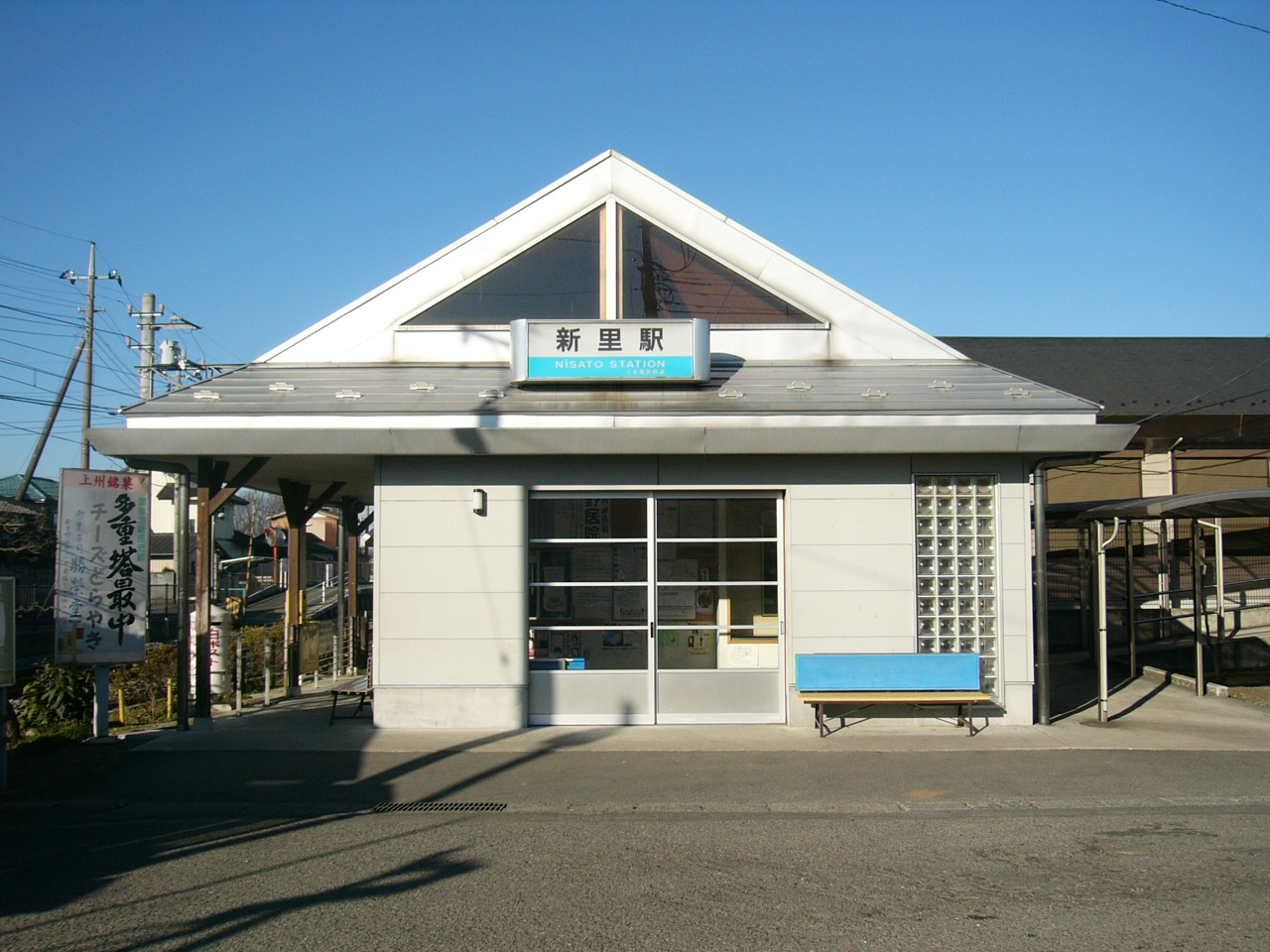
- Niisato Station in February 2004

General information
- Location: Niisato-cho Kobayashi 126-1, Kiryū-shi, Gunma-ken 376-0124; Japan
- Coordinates: 36°25′07″N 139°14′16″E
- Operator: Jōmō Electric Railway Company
- Line: ■ Jōmō Line
- Distance: 15.8 km from Chūō-Maebashi
- Platforms: 2 side platforms

Other information
- Status: Unstaffed
- Website: Official website

History
- Opened: November 10, 1928
- Former names: Takei Station (to 1948)

Passengers
- FY2019: 371

Services
Preceding station	Jōmō Electric Railway	Following station
Zen towards Chūō-Maebashi	Jōmō Line	Nikkawa towards Nishi-Kiryū
Location
- Location within Gunma Prefecture Location within Japan

Niisato Station (新里駅, Niisato-eki) is a passenger railway station in the city of Kiryū, Gunma, Japan, operated by the private railway operator Jōmō Electric Railway Company.

== Lines ==
Niisato Station is a station on the Jōmō Line, and is located 15.8 kilometers from the terminus of the line at Chūō-Maebashi.

== Station layout ==
Niisato Station has two opposed side platforms connected by a level crossing.

=== Platforms ===
1	■ Jōmō Line	for Akagi, Nishi-Kiryū
2	■ Jōmō Line	for Chūō-Maebashi

== History ==
Niisato Station was opened on November 10, 1928. At the time of opening, it was known as Takei Station (武井駅, Takei-eki). It was renamed to its present name on May 1, 1948. A new station building was completed on March 27, 1998.

== Passenger statistics ==
In fiscal 2019, the station was used by an average of 371 passengers daily (boarding passengers only).

== Surrounding area ==
- Niisato Post Office

== See also ==
- List of railway stations in Japan
