= Fujiyamashita Station =

Railway station in Kiryū, Gunma Prefecture, Japan

Fujiyamashita Station 富士山下駅
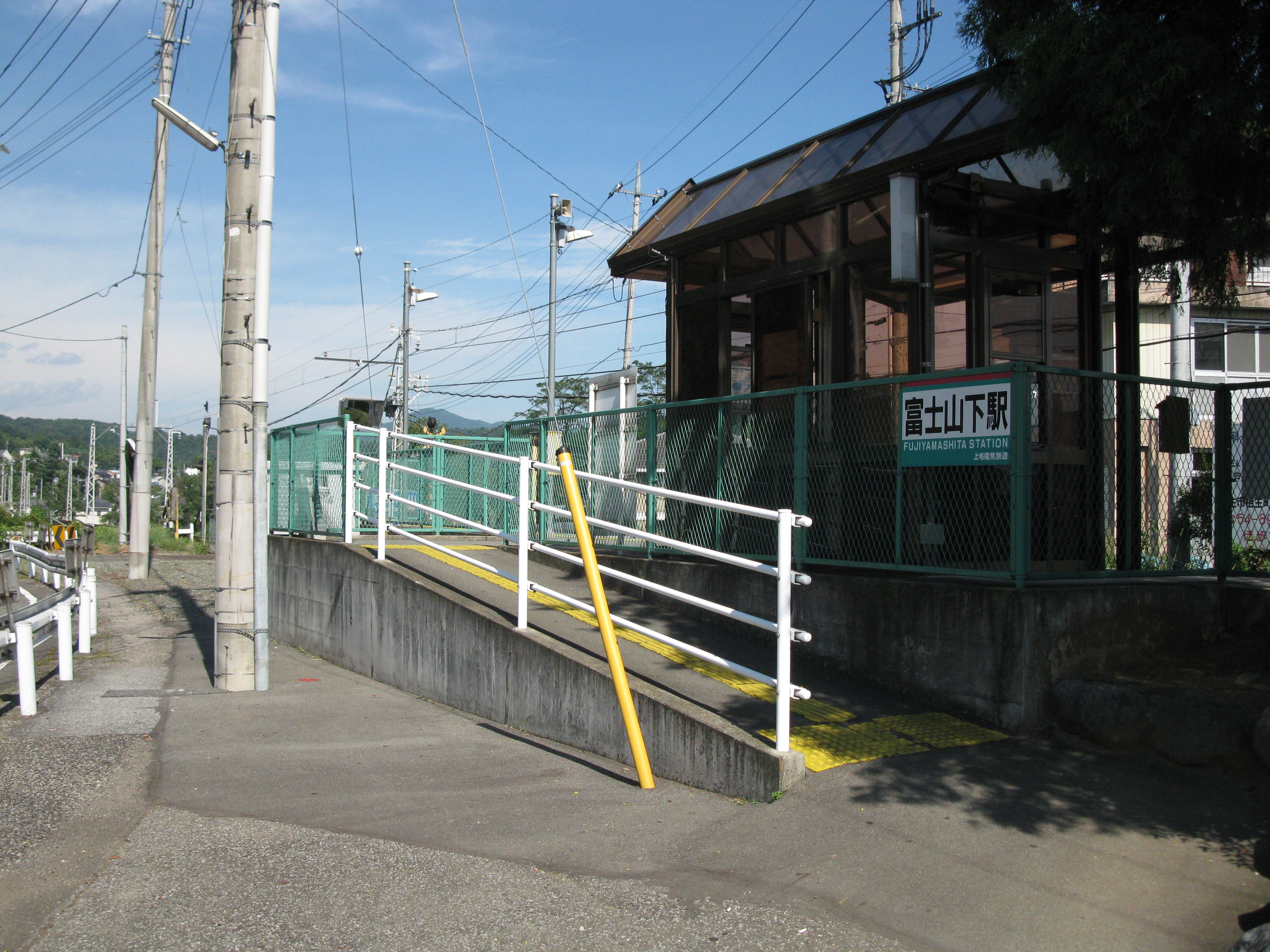
- Fujiyamashita Station in September 2010

General information
- Location: Aioi-cho 2-274-7, Kiryū-shi, Gunma-ken 376-0011; Japan
- Coordinates: 36°24′50.73″N 139°18′57.24″E
- Operator: Jōmō Electric Railway Company
- Line: ■ Jōmō Line
- Distance: 23.7 km from Chūō-Maebashi
- Platforms: 1 side platform
- Tracks: 1

Other information
- Status: Unstaffed
- Website: Official website

History
- Opened: November 10, 1928

Passengers
- FY2019: 85

Services
Preceding station	Jōmō Electric Railway	Following station
Tennōjuku towards Chūō-Maebashi	Jōmō Line	Maruyamashita towards Nishi-Kiryū
Location
- Location within Gunma Prefecture Location within Japan

Fujiyamashita Station (富士山下駅, Fujiyama-shita-eki) is a passenger railway station in the city of Kiryū, Gunma, Japan, operated by the private railway operator Jōmō Electric Railway Company. Travelers looking for Mount Fuji should be careful not to mistakenly come to this station. Fujiyamashita Station is around 200 km and two prefectures away from Japan's most famous mountain. The name means "The bottom of Fuji Mountain" and when written in kanji characters is identical to Mount Fuji, but does not have any relation to the popular tourist destination.

== Lines ==
Fujiyamashita Station is a station on the Jōmō Line, and is located 23.7 kilometers from the terminus of the line at Chūō-Maebashi .

== Station layout ==
Fujiyamashita Station consists of one side platform serving traffic in both directions. The station is unattended.

== History ==
Fujiyamashita Station was opened on November 10, 1928.

== Passenger statistics ==
In fiscal 2019, the station was used by an average of 85 passengers daily (boarding passengers only).

== Surrounding area ==
- Watarase River

== See also ==
- List of railway stations in Japan
