= Kasukawa Station =

Railway station in Maebashi, Gunma Prefecture, Japan

Kasukawa Station 粕川駅
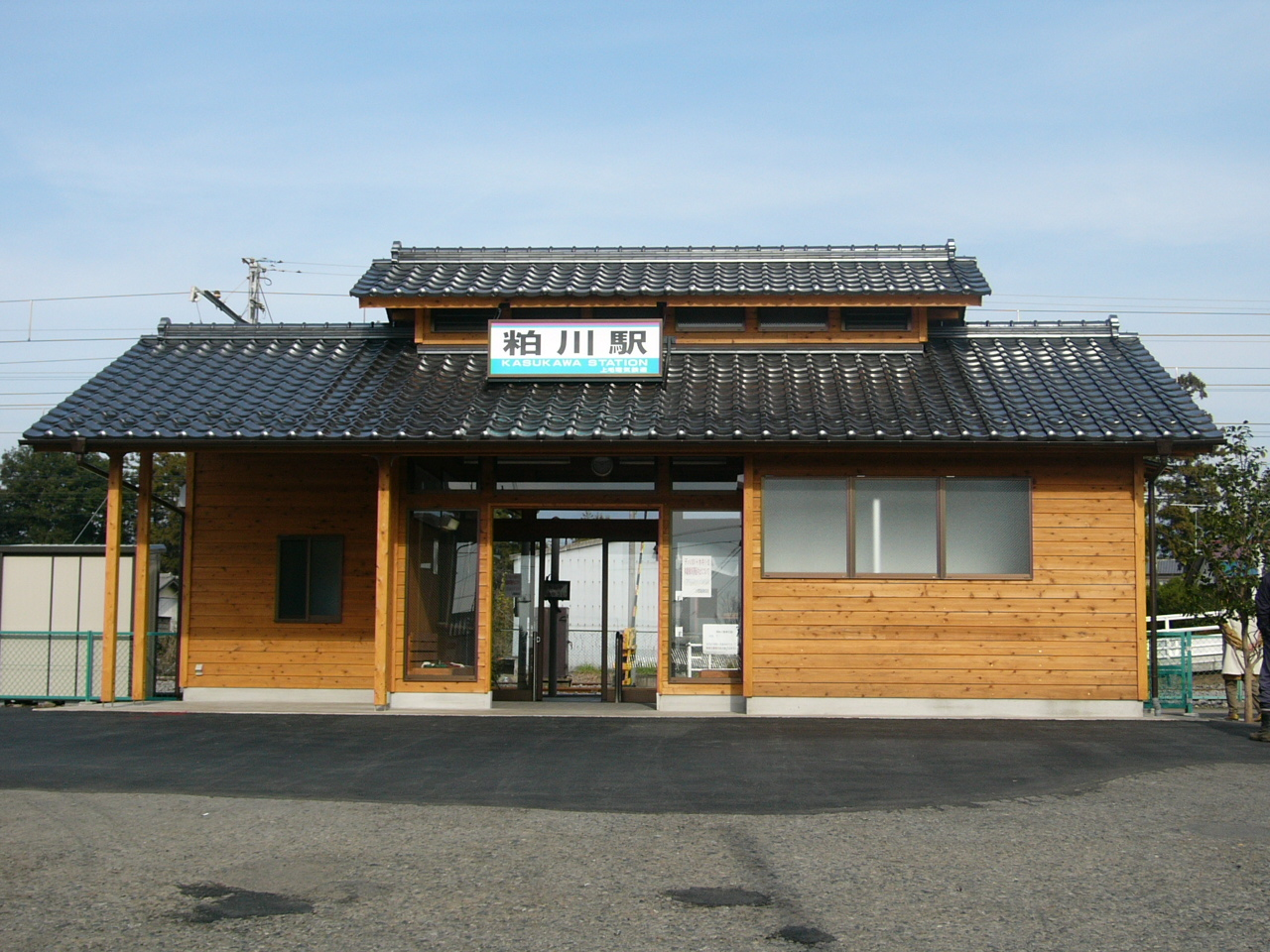
- Kasukawa Station in December 2004

General information
- Location: Kasukawa-machi Nishitanabo 293-2, Maebashi-shi, Gunma-ken 371-0217; Japan
- Coordinates: 36.4167°N 139.2107°E
- Operator: Jōmō Electric Railway Company
- Line: ■ Jōmō Line
- Distance: 13.3 km from Chūō-Maebashi
- Platforms: 1 island platform

History
- Opened: November 10, 1928

Passengers
- FY2015: 286

Services
Preceding station	Jōmō Electric Railway	Following station
Araya towards Chūō-Maebashi	Jōmō Line	Zen towards Nishi-Kiryū
Location
- Location within Gunma Prefecture Location within Japan

Kasukawa Station (粕川駅, Kasukawa-eki) is a passenger railway station in the city of Maebashi, Gunma Prefecture, Japan, operated by the private railway operator Jōmō Electric Railway Company.

== Lines ==
Kasukawa Station is a station on the Jōmō Line, and is located 13.3 kilometers (8.3 mi) from the terminus of the line at Chūō-Maebashi .

== Station layout ==
The station consists of a single island platform connected to the station building by a level crossing.

=== Platforms ===
1	■ Jōmō Line	for Chūō-Maebashi
2	■ Jōmō Line	for Nishi-Kiryū

== History ==
Kasukawa Station was opened on November 10, 1928. A new station building was completed on November 30, 2004.

== See also ==
- List of railway stations in Japan
