= Shinzō-Kekkan Center Station =

Railway station in Maebashi, Gunma Prefecture, Japan

Shinzō-Kekkan Center Station 心臓血管センター駅
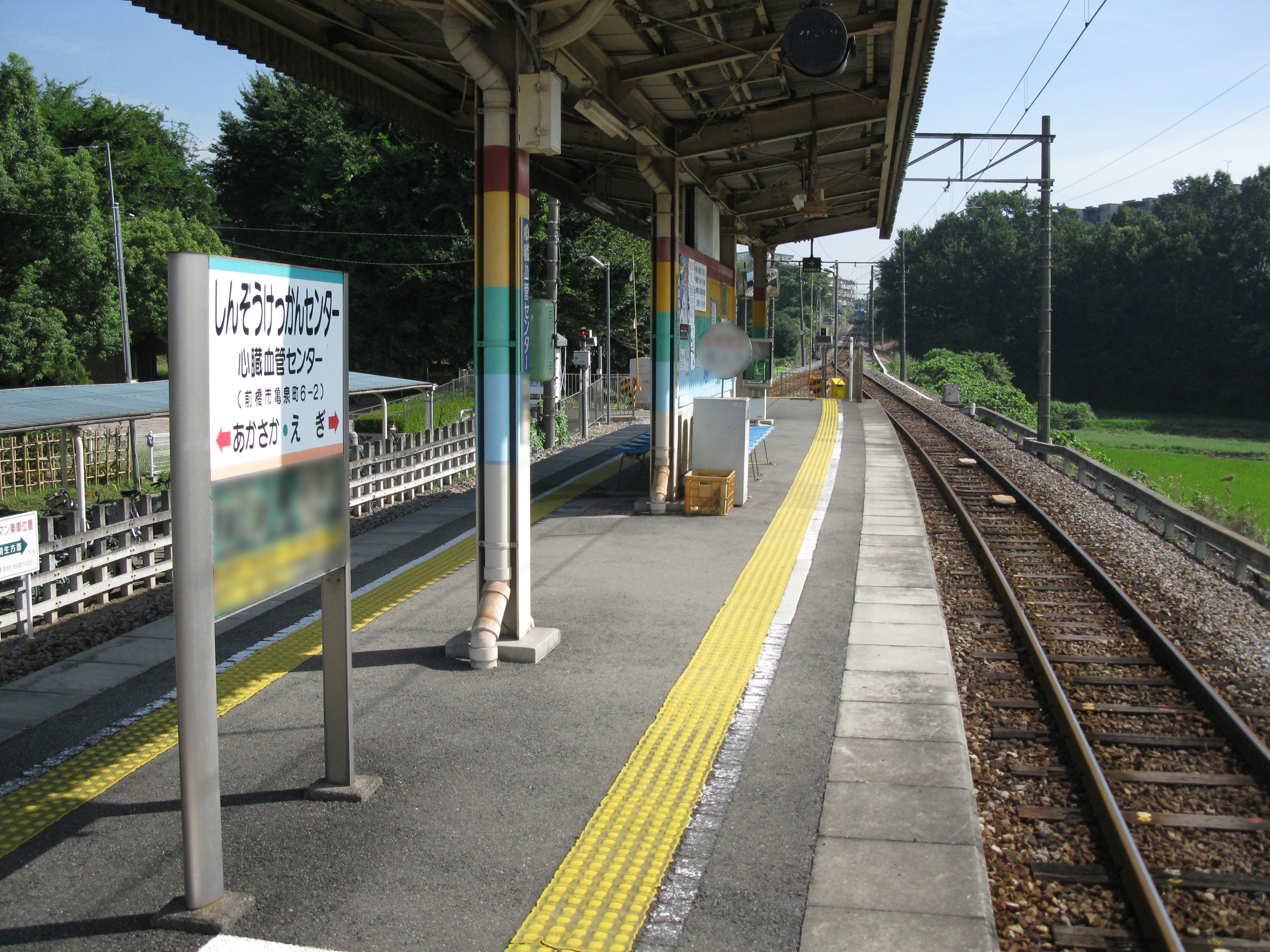
- Shinzō-Kekkan Center Station in September 2010

General information
- Location: Kameizumimachi 6-2, Maebashi-shi, Gunma-ken 371-0004; Japan
- Coordinates: 36°24′19″N 139°07′44″E
- Operator: Jōmō Electric Railway Company
- Line: ■ Jōmō Line
- Distance: 5.6 km from Chūō-Maebashi
- Platforms: 1 island platform

History
- Opened: April 10, 1994
- Former names: Junkankibyo Center (until 2001)

Passengers
- FY2015: 72

Services
Preceding station	Jōmō Electric Railway	Following station
Akasaka towards Chūō-Maebashi	Jōmō Line	Egi towards Nishi-Kiryū
Location
- Location within Gunma Prefecture Location within Japan

Shinzō-Kekkan Center Station (心臓血管センター駅, Shinzō-kekkan-sentā-eki) is a passenger railway station in the city of Maebashi, Gunma Prefecture, Japan, operated by the private railway operator Jōmō Electric Railway Company.

== Lines ==
Shinzō-Kekkan Center Station is a station on the Jōmō Line, and is located 5.6 kilometers from the terminus of the line at Chūō-Maebashi.

== Station layout ==
The station consists of a single island platform with a level crossing.

=== Platforms ===
1	■ Jōmō Line	for Chūō-Maebashi
2	■ Jōmō Line	for Akagi and Nishi-Kiryū

== History ==
Shinzō-Kekkan Center Station was opened as a signal stop named Maebashi Byoinmae shingosho (前橋病院前信号所). It was elevated to a full passenger station named Junkankibyo senta eki (循環器病センター駅) on April 10, 1994 and renamed to its present name on June 1, 2001.

== Surrounding area ==
- Gunma Cardiovascular Center

== See also ==
- List of railway stations in Japan
