= Higoshi Station =

Railway station in Maebashi, Gunma Prefecture, Japan

Higoshi Station 樋越駅
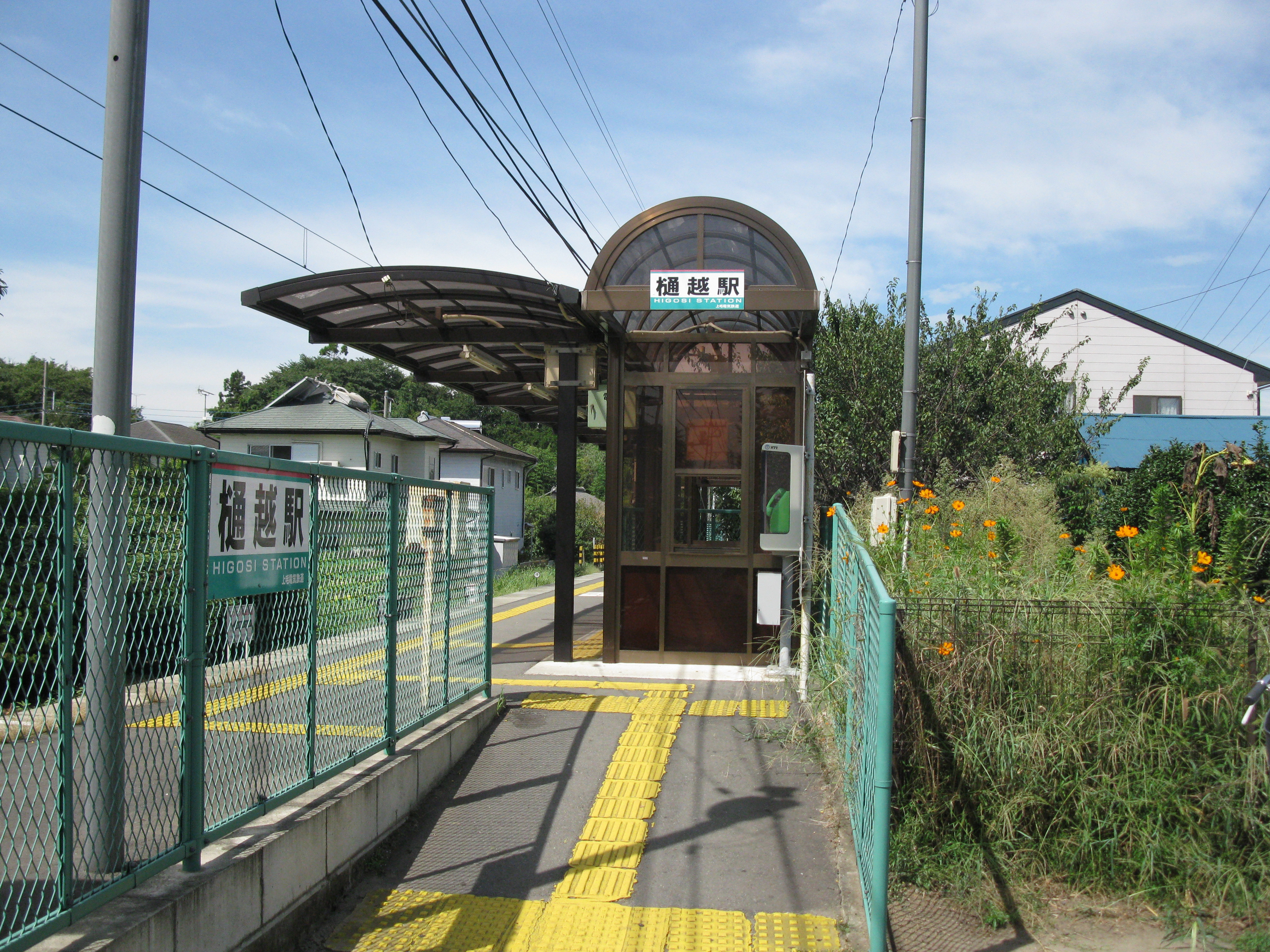
- Higoshi Station in September 2010

General information
- Location: Higoshi-machi 191-4, Maebashi-shi, Gunma-ken 371-0221; Japan
- Coordinates: 36.4155°N 139.1733°E
- Operator: Jōmō Electric Railway Company
- Line: ■ Jōmō Line
- Distance: 9.9 km from Chūō-Maebashi
- Platforms: 1 side platform

History
- Opened: November 10, 1928

Passengers
- FY2015: 201

Services
Preceding station	Jōmō Electric Railway	Following station
Ōgo towards Chūō-Maebashi	Jōmō Line	Kitahara towards Nishi-Kiryū
Location
- Location within Gunma Prefecture Location within Japan

Higoshi Station (樋越駅, Higoshi-eki) is a passenger railway station in the city of Maebashi, Gunma Prefecture, Japan. It is operated by the private railway operator Jōmō Electric Railway Company.

== Lines ==
Higoshi Station is a station on the Jōmō Line, and is located 9.9 kilometers from the terminus of the line at Chūō-Maebashi .

== Station layout ==
The station consists of a single side platform serving traffic in both directions. The station is unattended.

== History ==
Higoshi Station was opened on November 10, 1928.

== Usage status ==
The average daily passenger numbers are as follows:

Daily passenger numbers
Year	Average number of people per day
2011	209
2012	241
2013	240
2014	222
2015	201
2016	199
2017	205
2018	214

== Surrounding area ==
- Higoshi Public Hall

== See also ==
- List of railway stations in Japan
