= Higashi-Nikkawa Station =

Railway station in Kiryū, Gunma Prefecture, Japan

Higashi-Nikkawa Station 東新川駅
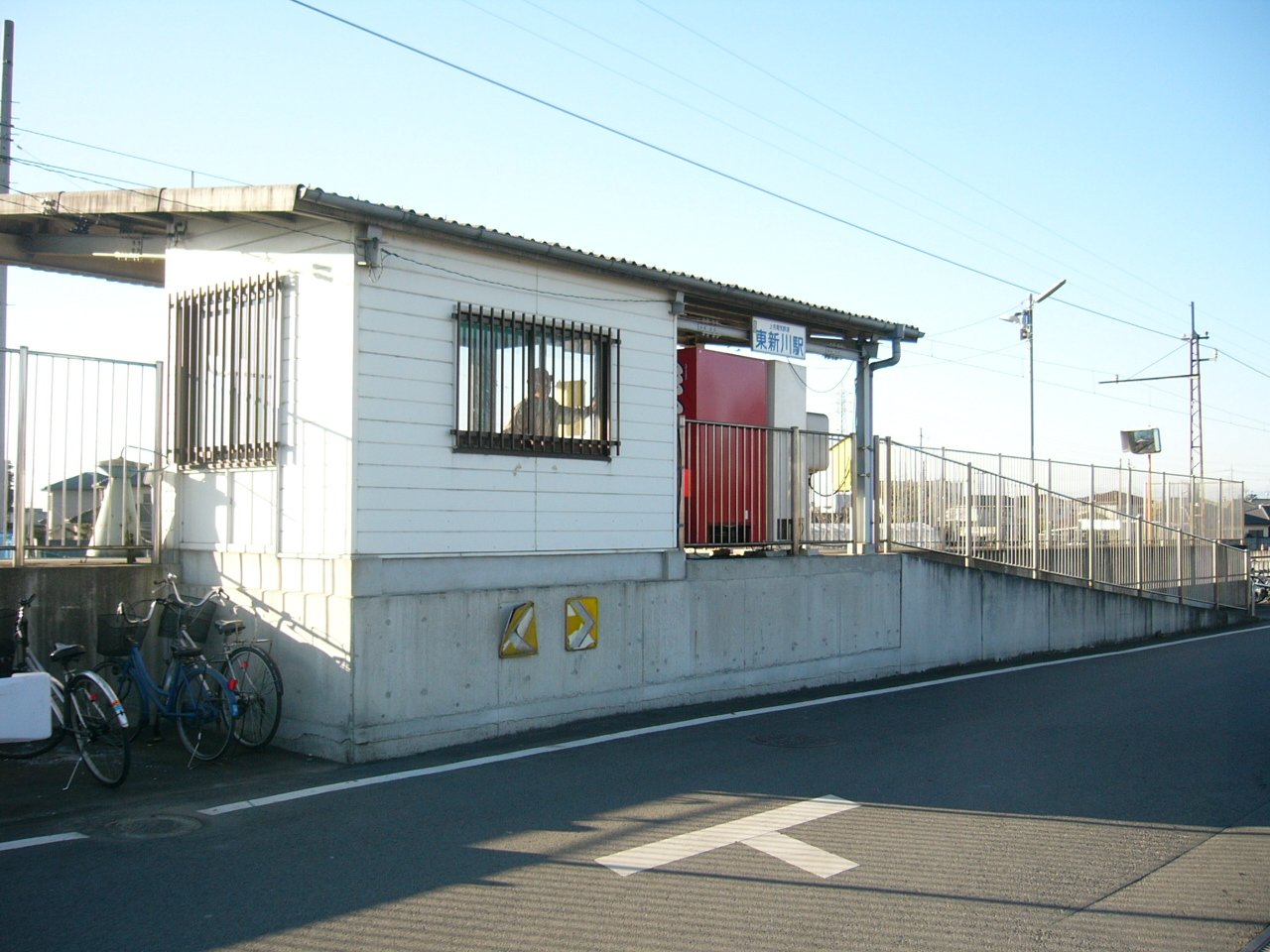
- Higashi-Nikkawa Station in February 2004

General information
- Location: Niisatocho Nikkawa 3906, Kiryū-shi, Gunma-ken 376-0121; Japan
- Coordinates: 36°25′19″N 139°16′03″E
- Operator: Jōmō Electric Railway Company
- Line: ■ Jōmō Line
- Distance: 18.7 km from Chūō-Maebashi
- Platforms: 1 side platform
- Tracks: 1

Other information
- Status: Unstaffed
- Website: Official website

History
- Opened: October 19, 1993.

Passengers
- FY2019: 51

Services
Preceding station	Jōmō Electric Railway	Following station
Nikkawa towards Chūō-Maebashi	Jōmō Line	Akagi towards Nishi-Kiryū
Location
- Location within Gunma Prefecture Location within Japan

Higashi-Nikkawa Station (東新川駅, Higashi-Nikkawa-eki) is a passenger railway station in the city of Kiryū, Gunma, Japan, operated by the private railway operator Jōmō Electric Railway Company.

== Lines ==
Higashi-Nikkawa Station is a station on the Jōmō Line, and is located 18.7 kilometers from the terminus of the line at Chūō-Maebashi .

== Station layout ==
The station consists of one side platform serving traffic in both directions. There is no station building, but only an open-sided weather shelter next to the platform. The station is unattended.

== History ==
Higashi-Nikkawa Station was opened on October 19, 1993.

== Passenger statistics ==
In fiscal 2019, the station was used by an average of 54 passengers daily (boarding passengers only).

== Surrounding area ==
Higashi-Nikkawa Station is located in a suburban residential area.

== See also ==
- List of railway stations in Japan
