= Ōgo Station =

Railway station in Maebashi, Gunma Prefecture, Japan

Ōgo Station 大胡駅
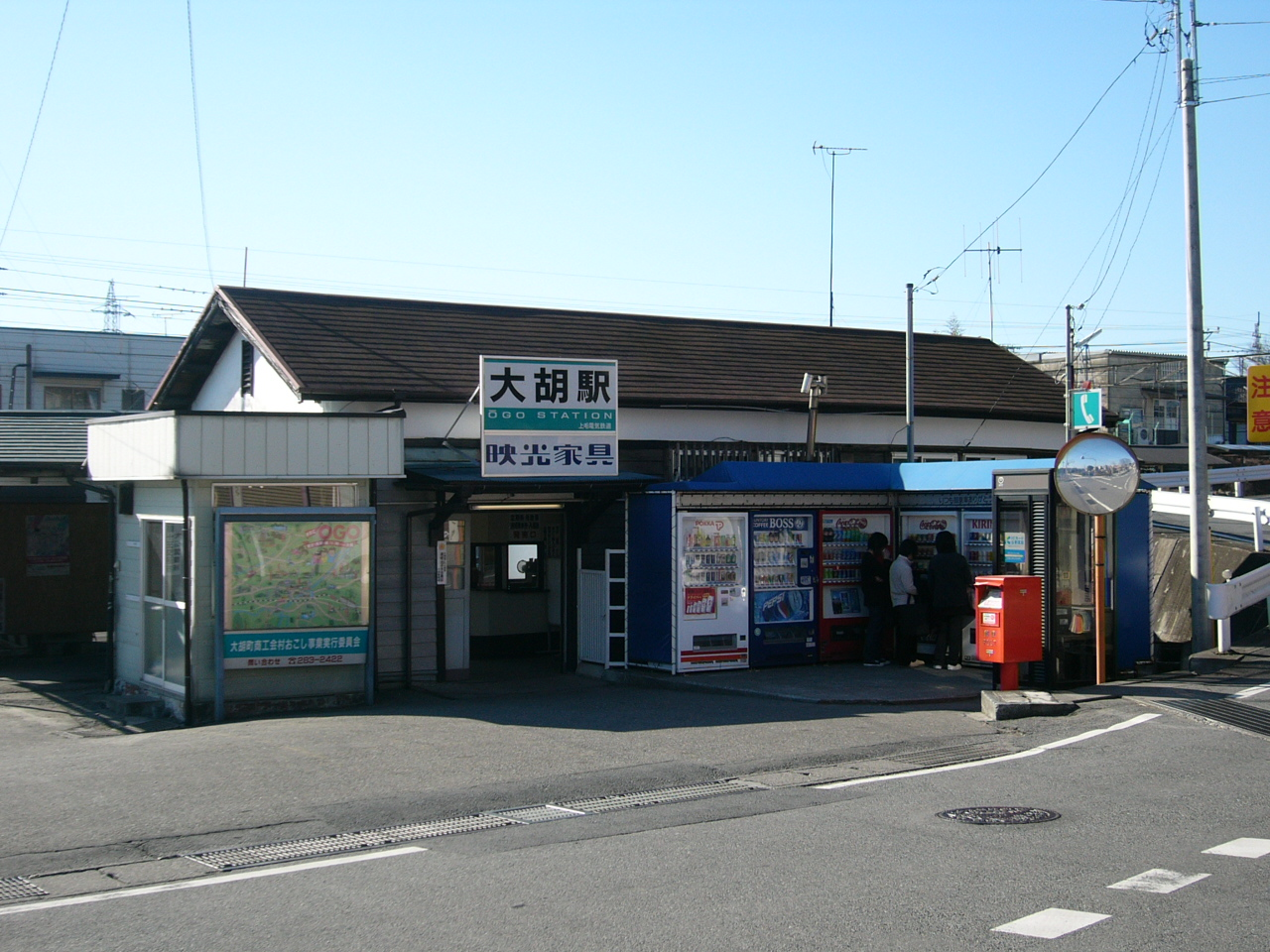
- Ōgo Station in September 2010

General information
- Location: Motogimachi 41-2, Maebashi-shi, Gunma-ken 371-0232; Japan
- Coordinates: 36.4124°N 139.1561°E
- Operator: Jōmō Electric Railway Company
- Line: ■ Jōmō Line
- Distance: 8.3 km from Chūō-Maebashi
- Platforms: 1 island platform

History
- Opened: November 10, 1928

Passengers
- FY2015: 863

Services
Preceding station	Jōmō Electric Railway	Following station
Egi towards Chūō-Maebashi	Jōmō Line	Higoshi towards Nishi-Kiryū
Location
- Location within Gunma Prefecture Location within Japan

Ōgo Station (大胡駅, Ōgo-eki) is a passenger railway station in the city of Maebashi, Gunma Prefecture, Japan, operated by the private railway operator Jōmō Electric Railway Company.

== Lines ==
Ōgo Station is a station on the Jōmō Line, and is located 8.3 kilometers from the terminus of the line at Chūō-Maebashi .

== Station layout ==
The station consists of a single island platform connected to the station building by a level crossing.

=== Platforms ===
1	■ Jōmō Line	for Chūō-Maebashi
2	■ Jōmō Line	for Nishi-Kiryū

== History ==
Ōgo Station was opened on November 10, 1928. The rail facilities at the station were proclaimed Registered Tangible Cultural Properties on July 31, 2007 by the Agency for Cultural Affairs. These include the station building, the train garage, the transformer house, electrical transmission tower, the electrical sub-station, overhead electrical transmission tower and electrical wire retention tower.

== Surrounding area ==
- former Ōgo town hall
- Ōgo Public Hall

== See also ==
- List of railway stations in Japan
