= Kiryū-Kyūjō-Mae Station =

Railway station in Kiryū, Gunma Prefecture, Japan

Kiryū-kyūjō-mae Station 桐生球場前駅
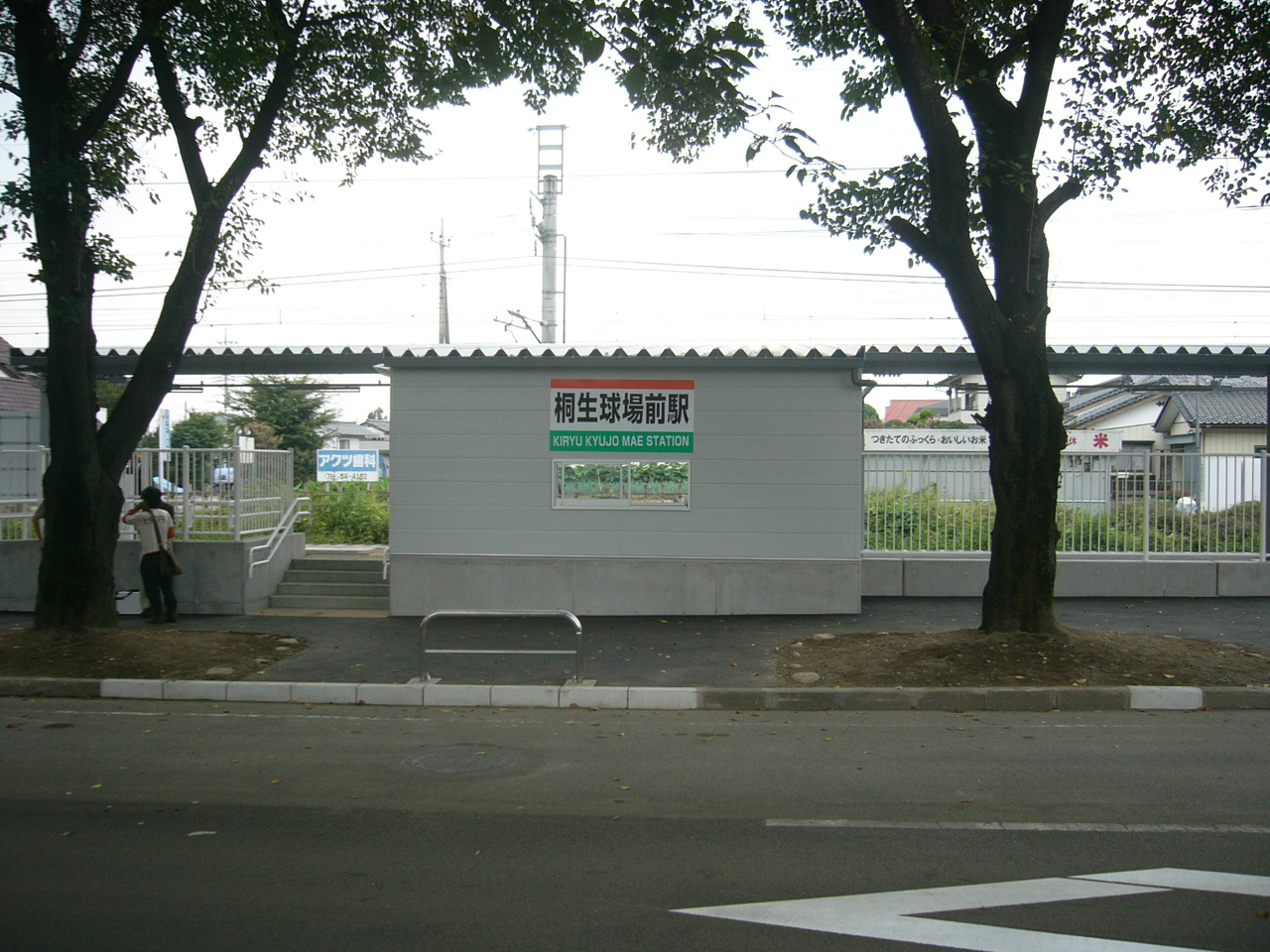
- Kiryū-kyūjō-mae Station in September 2006

General information
- Location: Aioi-cho 2-532-3, Kiryū-shi, Gunma-ken 376-0011; Japan
- Coordinates: 36.4192°N 139.2978°E
- Operator: Jōmō Electric Railway Company
- Line: ■ Jōmō Line
- Distance: 21.8 km from Chūō-Maebashi
- Platforms: 1 side platform
- Tracks: 1

Other information
- Status: Unstaffed
- Website: Official website

History
- Opened: October 1, 2006

Passengers
- FY2019: 127

Services
Preceding station	Jōmō Electric Railway	Following station
Akagi towards Chūō-Maebashi	Jōmō Line	Tennōjuku towards Nishi-Kiryū
Location
- Location within Gunma Prefecture Location within Japan

Kiryū-Kyūjō-Mae Station (桐生球場前駅, Kiryū-kyūjō-mae-eki) is a passenger railway station in the city of Kiryū, Gunma, Japan, operated by the private railway operator Jōmō Electric Railway Company.

== Lines ==
Kiryū-kyūjō-mae Station is a station on the Jōmō Line, and is located 21.8 kilometers from the terminus of the line at Chūō-Maebashi .

== Station layout ==
The station consists of one side platform serving traffic in both directions. There is no station building, but only an open-sided weather shelter next to the platform. The station is unattended.

== History ==
Kiryū-kyūjō-mae Station was opened on October 1, 2006.

== Passenger statistics ==
In fiscal 2019, the station was used by an average of 127 passengers daily (boarding passengers only).

== Surrounding area ==
- Kiryū Sports Park
- Kiryū Baseball Stadium

== See also ==
- List of railway stations in Japan
