= Lake Umeda =

Dam lake in Japan

Coordinates: 36°28′44.4″N 139°24′46.1″E

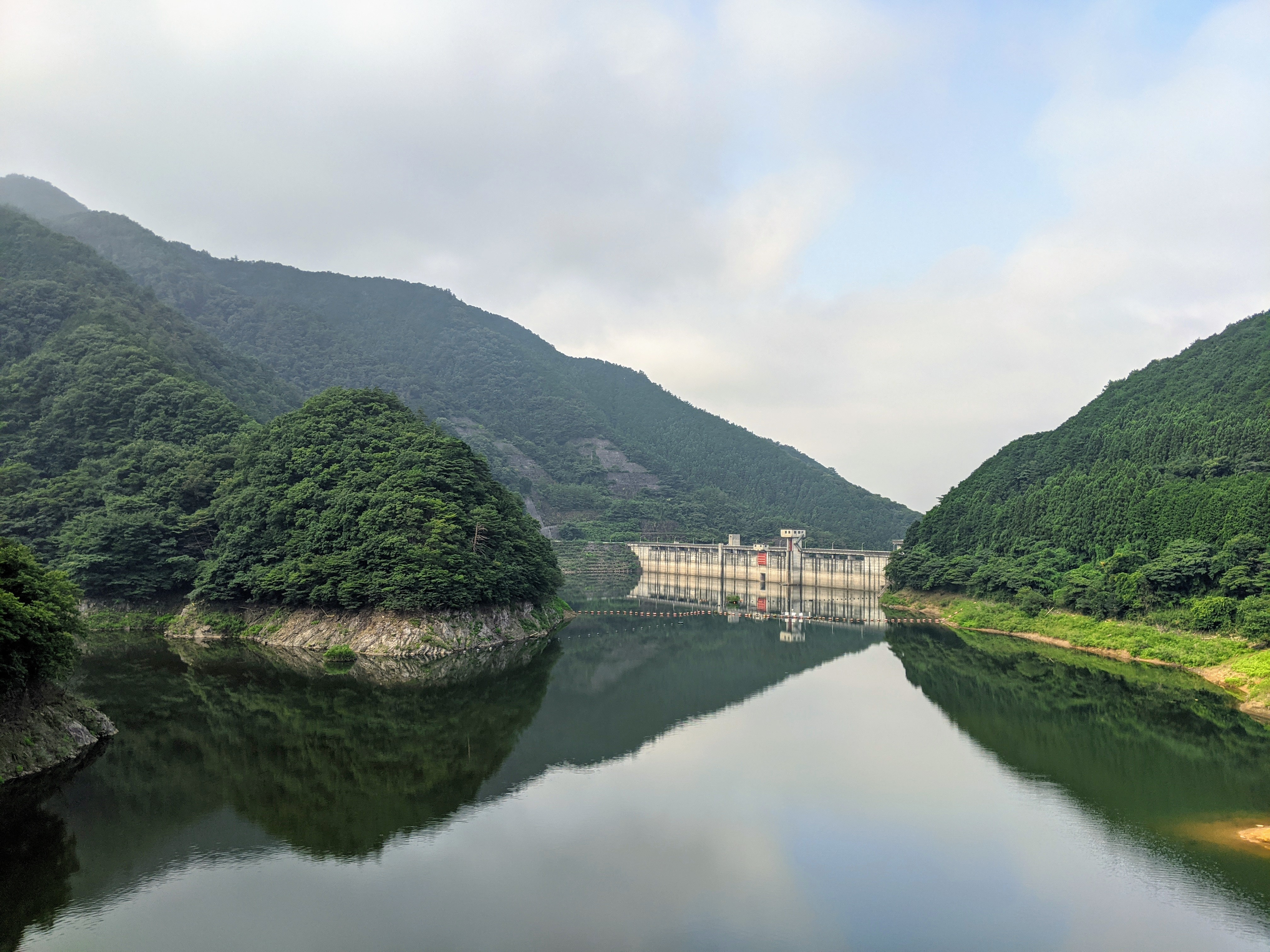
Lake Umeda from the Ohashi Bridge facing south towards the Kiryu Dam

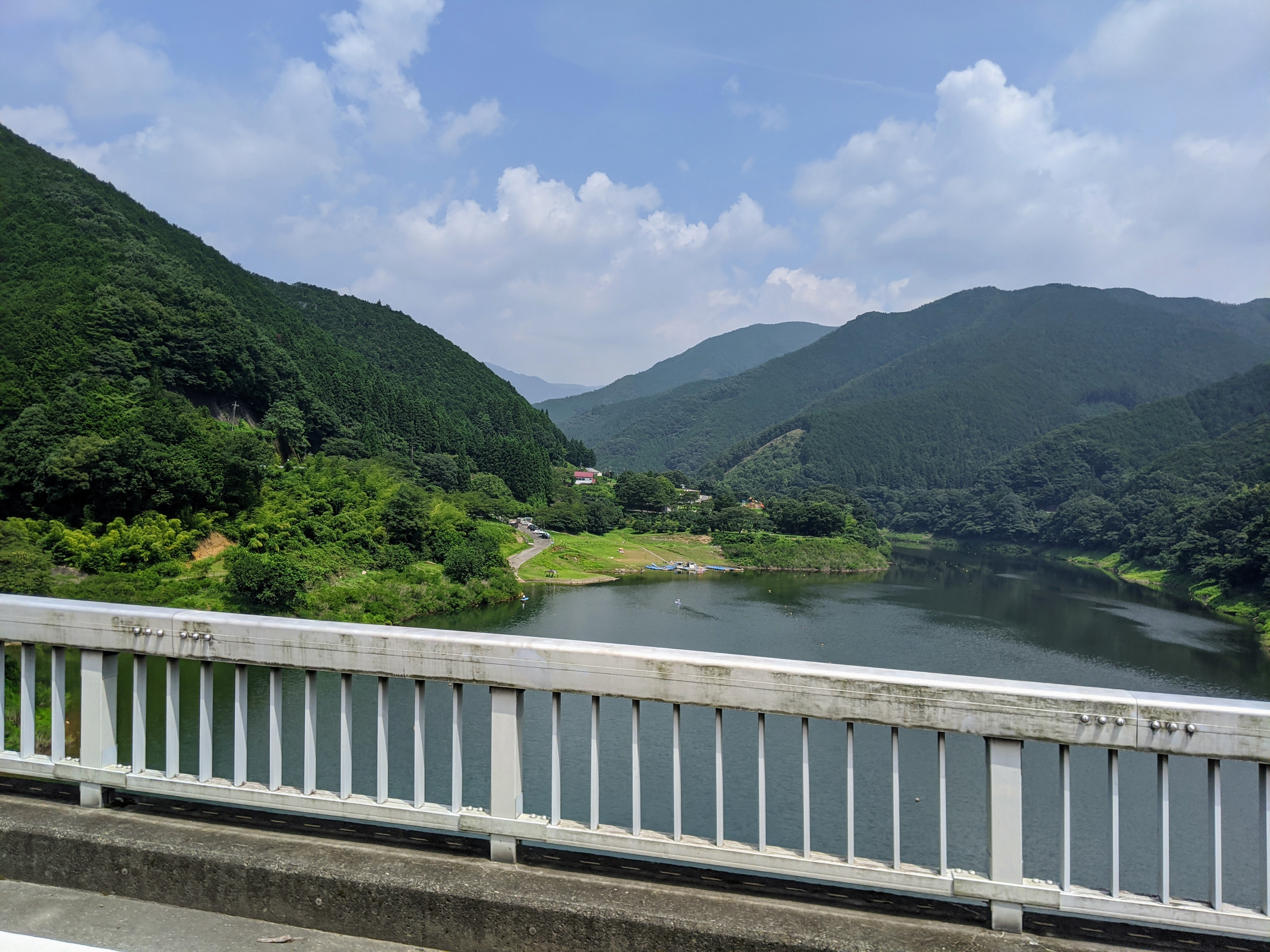
Lake Umeda facing north from the Ohashi Bridge

Lake Umeda (梅田湖 Umeda-ko) is a dam lake on the north side of Kiryu City, Gunma Prefecture, Japan. The name translates to Plum Field Lake, or Plum Lake. Lake Umeda sits at 226m above sea level and the Kiryu Dam that holds the lake is 262m above sea. There is a bridge called Ohashi (大橋 Oohashi) that bisects the lake. The lake is approximately 13 kilometers from Kiryu City and a frequent recreation area for residents in the Kiryu area. Common activities around the lake include fishing, hiking, and cycling.
