= Takei temple ruins =

- 武井廃寺塔跡 (Japanese)
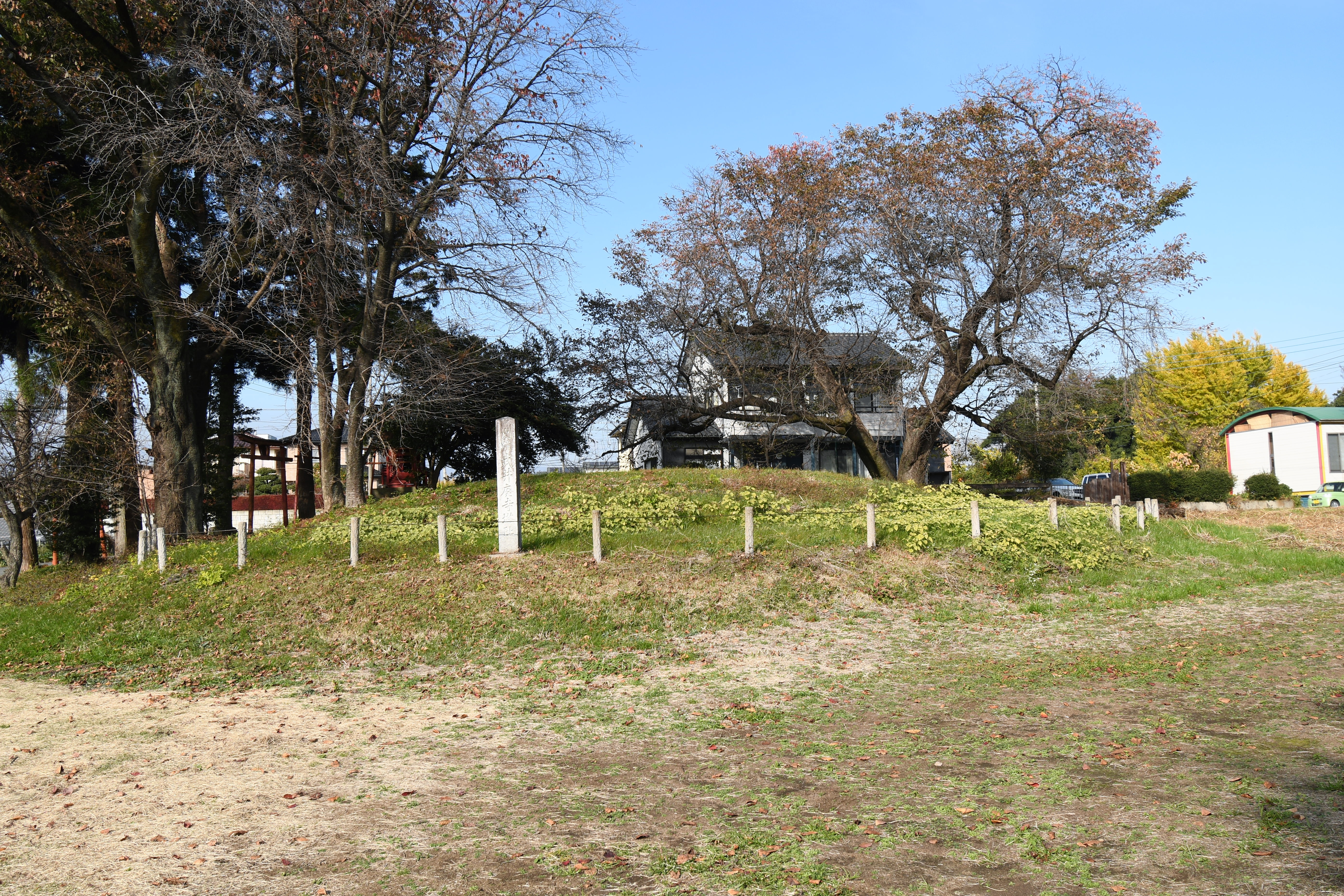

- Takei temple ruins Takei temple ruins (Japan)
- 36°25′26″N 139°14′35″E
- Periods: Nara period
- Location: Kiryū, Gunma, Japan
- Region: Kantō region

History
- Built: late 7th century

Site notes
- Public access: Yes (no facilities)

The Takei temple ruins (武井廃寺塔跡, Takei Haiji tō ato) is an archaeological site with the foundations of what appears to have been a pagoda located in what is now the city of Kiryū, Gunma Prefecture in the northern Kantō region of Japan. It was designated a National Historic Site of Japan in 1941.

== Overview ==
The Takei temple ruins consists of a shaped cornerstone made of andesite with a diameter of 107 centimeters, resting on a soil base. This foundation stone has a hole with a diameter of 42 cm and depth of 38 cm drilled in its center. Since fragments of roof tiles from the Nara period have been found surrounding this foundation stone, was believed to have been the foundation of a pagoda from a now-vanished Nara period Buddhist temple. However, since no other foundation stones were found in the vicinity, and as the terrain is on a slope, it gradually became accepted that this assumption was incorrect. A further archaeological excavation in 1969 revealed that the base of the structure was an octagon, measuring 7.8 meters on each side. It is now believed to have been a structure covering a grave site, as similar burial mounds have been found in the Kinai region of Japan.

The site is located about 15 minutes on foot from Niizato Station on Jōmō Electric Railway.

== See also ==
- List of Historic Sites of Japan (Gunma)
