= Araya Station (Gunma) =

Railway station in Maebashi, Gunma Prefecture, Japan

Araya Station 新屋駅
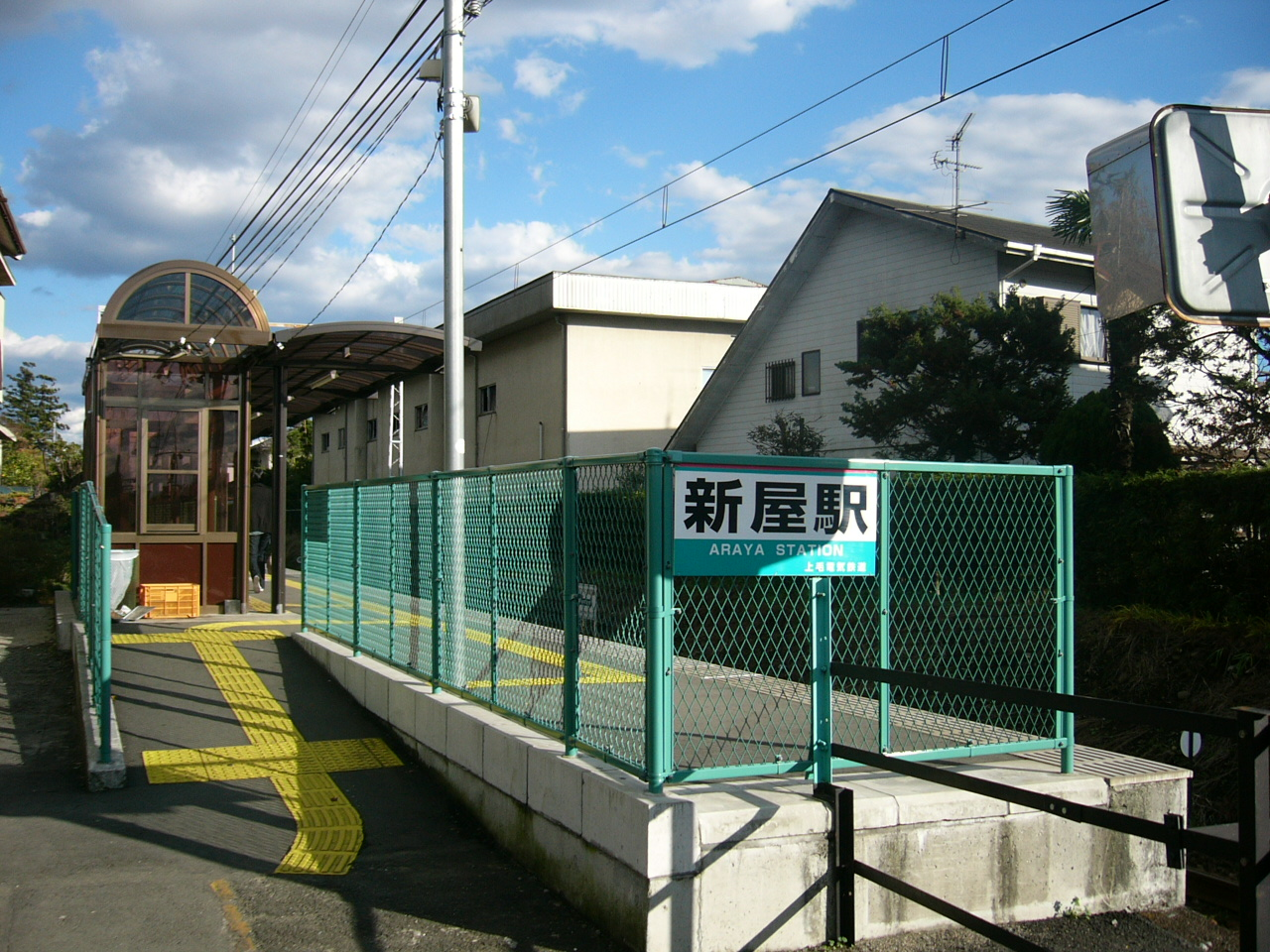
- Araya Station in December 2004

General information
- Location: Kasukawamachi Araya 233-2, Maebashi-shi, Gunma-ken 371-0206; Japan
- Coordinates: 36°24′50″N 139°11′47″E
- Operator: Jōmō Electric Railway Company
- Line: ■ Jōmō Line
- Distance: 12.0 km from Chūō-Maebashi
- Platforms: 1 side platform

History
- Opened: November 10, 1928

Passengers
- FY2015: 243

Services
Preceding station	Jōmō Electric Railway	Following station
Kitahara towards Chūō-Maebashi	Jōmō Line	Kasukawa towards Nishi-Kiryū
Location
- Location within Gunma Prefecture Location within Japan

Araya Station (新屋駅, Araya-eki) is a passenger railway station in the city of Maebashi, Gunma Prefecture, Japan, operated by the private railway operator Jōmō Electric Railway Company.

== Lines ==
Araya Station is a station on the Jōmō Line located 12.0 kilometers from the terminus of the line at Chūō-Maebashi .

== Station layout ==
Araya Station is an unattended station consisting of a single side platform serving traffic in both directions.

== History ==
Araya Station was opened on November 10, 1928.

== Surrounding area ==
The station is located in a suburban residential area.

== See also ==
- List of railway stations in Japan
