= Araya Station =

Araya Station is the name of multiple train stations in Japan.

- Araya Station (Akita) - (新屋駅) in Akita Prefecture
- Araya Station (Gunma) - (新屋駅) in Gunma Prefecture
