= Akasaka Station (Gunma) =

Railway station in Maebashi, Gunma Prefecture, Japan

Akasaka Station 赤坂駅
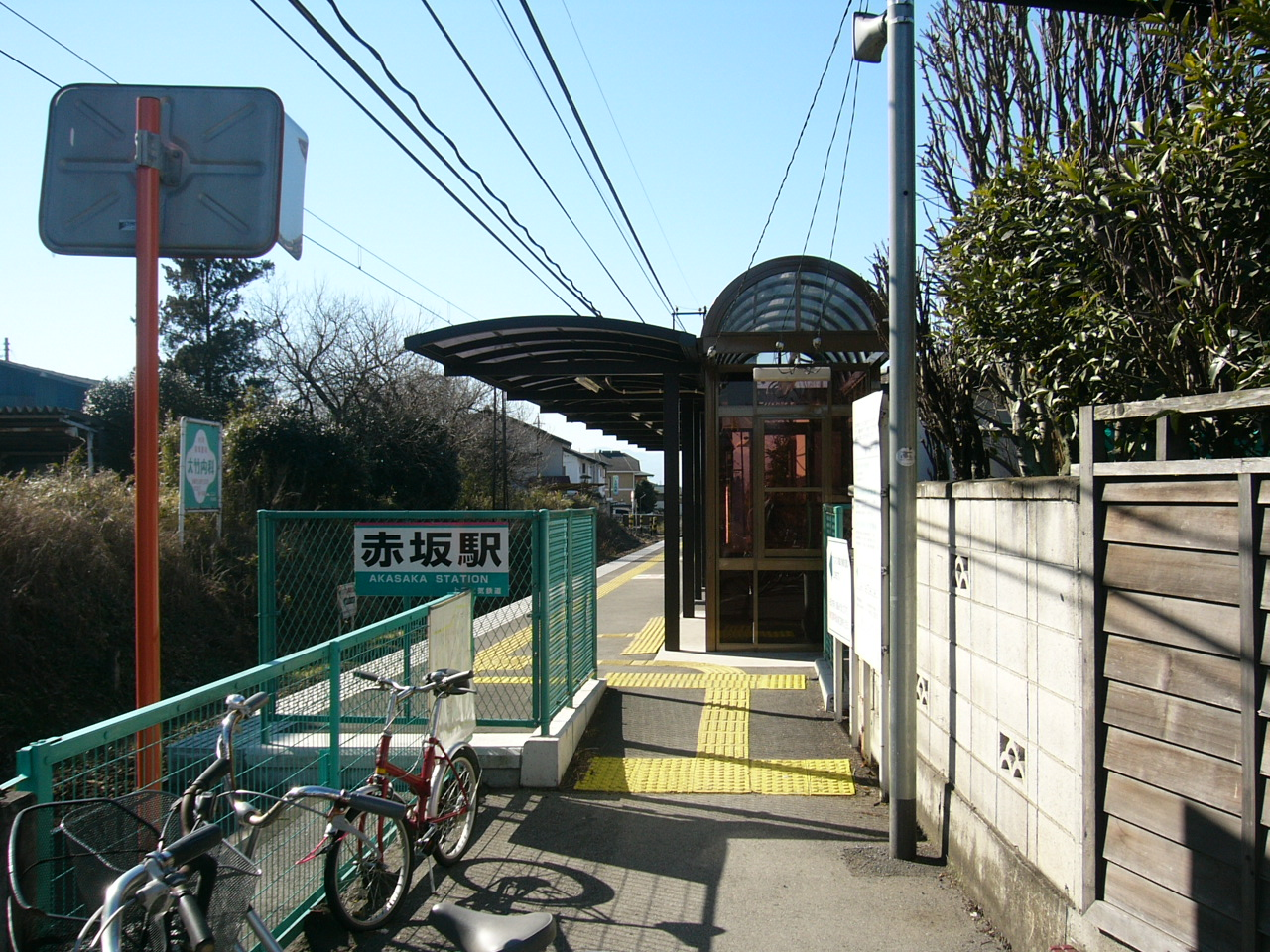
- Akasaka Station in February 2004

General information
- Location: Kamiizumimachi 3443-3, Maebashi-shi, Gunma-ken 371-0007; Japan
- Coordinates: 36°23′51″N 139°07′03″E
- Operator: Jōmō Electric Railway Company
- Line: ■ Jōmō Line
- Distance: 4.3 km from Chūō-Maebashi
- Platforms: 1 side platform

History
- Opened: December 18, 1933

Passengers
- FY2015: 237

Services
Preceding station	Jōmō Electric Railway	Following station
Kamiizumi towards Chūō-Maebashi	Jōmō Line	Shinzō-Kekkan Center towards Nishi-Kiryū
Location
- Location within Gunma Prefecture Location within Japan

Akasaka Station (赤坂駅, Akasaka-eki) is a passenger railway station in the city of Maebashi, Gunma Prefecture, Japan, operated by the private railway operator Jōmō Electric Railway Company.

== Lines ==
Akasaka Station is a station on the Jōmō Line, and is located 4.3 kilometers from the terminus of the line at Chūō-Maebashi.

== Station layout ==
The station consists of a single side platform serving traffic in both directions.

== History ==
Akasaka Station opened on December 18, 1930.

== Surrounding area ==
- Maebashi Fire Department Akasaki sub-station

== See also ==
- List of railway stations in Japan
