= Akasaka Station =

Akasaka Station is the name of several train stations in Japan:

- Akasaka Station (Tokyo) (赤坂駅) in Minato, Tokyo
- Akasaka Station (Gunma) (赤坂駅) in Maebashi, Gunma Prefecture
- Akasaka Station (Yamanashi) (赤坂駅) in Tsuru, Yamanashi Prefecture
- Akasaka Station (Fukuoka) (赤坂駅) in Chūō-ku, Fukuoka, Fukuoka Prefecture

It may also refer to:

- Mino-Akasaka Station (美濃赤坂駅) in Ōgaki, Gifu Prefecture
- Bingo-Akasaka Station (備後赤坂駅) in Fukuyama, Hiroshima Prefecture
- Meiden-Akasaka Station (名電赤坂駅) in Toyokawa, Aichi Prefecture
- Akasaka-mitsuke Station (赤坂見附駅) in Minato, Tokyo
