= Maebashi =

Prefecture Capital and Core city in Kantō, Japan

Maebashi 前橋市
- Prefecture capital and Core city
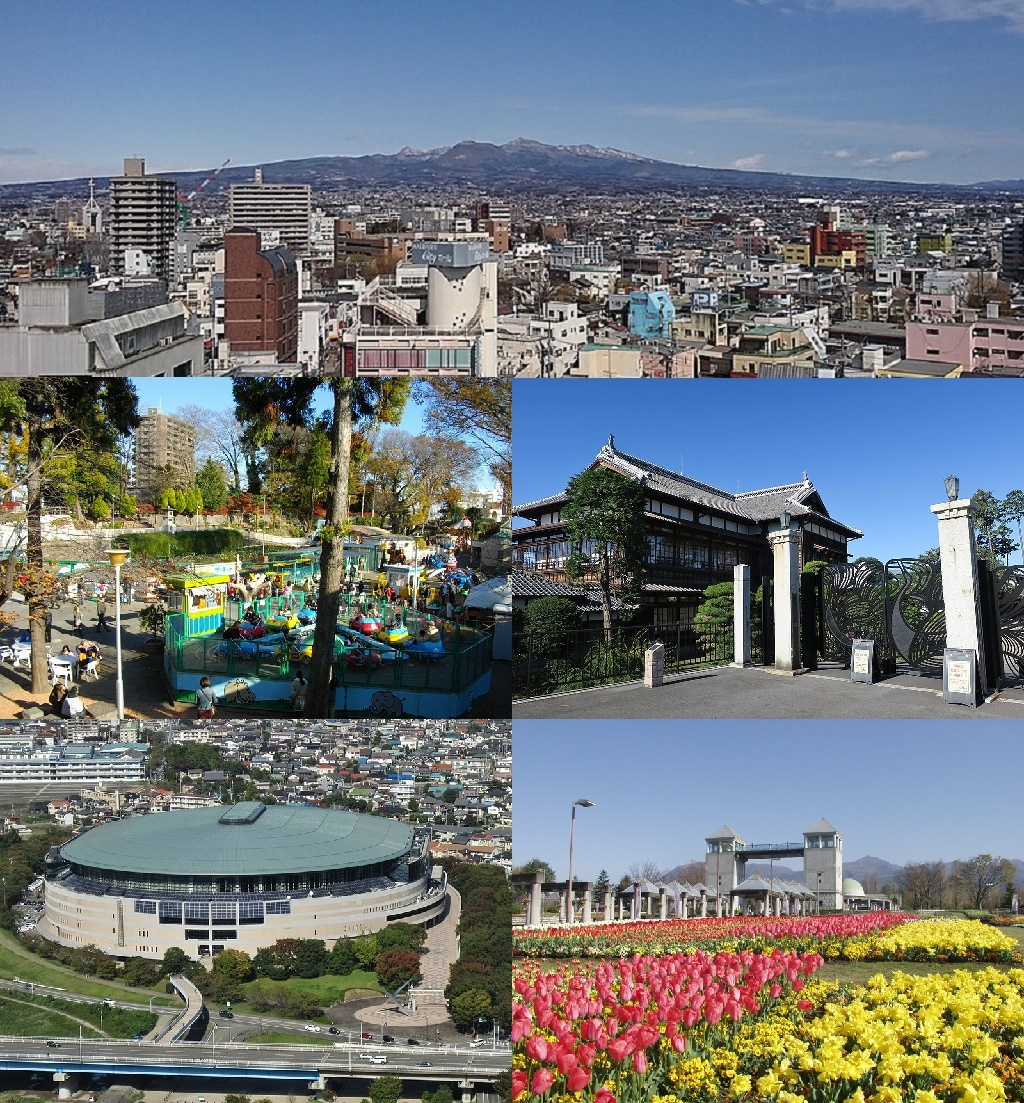

- Flag Seal

- Location of Maebashi in Gunma Prefecture

- Coordinates: 36°23′22.2″N 139°3′48.3″E
- Country: Japan
- Region: Kantō
- Prefecture: Gunma
- First official record: 4th century AD
- City settled: April 1, 1892

Government
  - Mayor: Akira Ogawa (小川晶) (from February 2024)

Area
  - Prefecture capital and Core city: 311.59 km^{2} (120.31 sq mi)

Population (August 31, 2020)
  - Prefecture capital and Core city: 335,352
  - Density: 1,076.3/km^{2} (2,787.5/sq mi)
  - Metro (2015): 1,263,034 (12th)
- Time zone: UTC+9 (Japan Standard Time)
- Tree: Ginkgo & Zelkova
- Flower: Rose & Azalea
- Phone number: 027-224-1111
- Address: 2-12-1, Ote-Machi, Maebashi-shi, Gunma-ken 371-8601
- Website: Official website

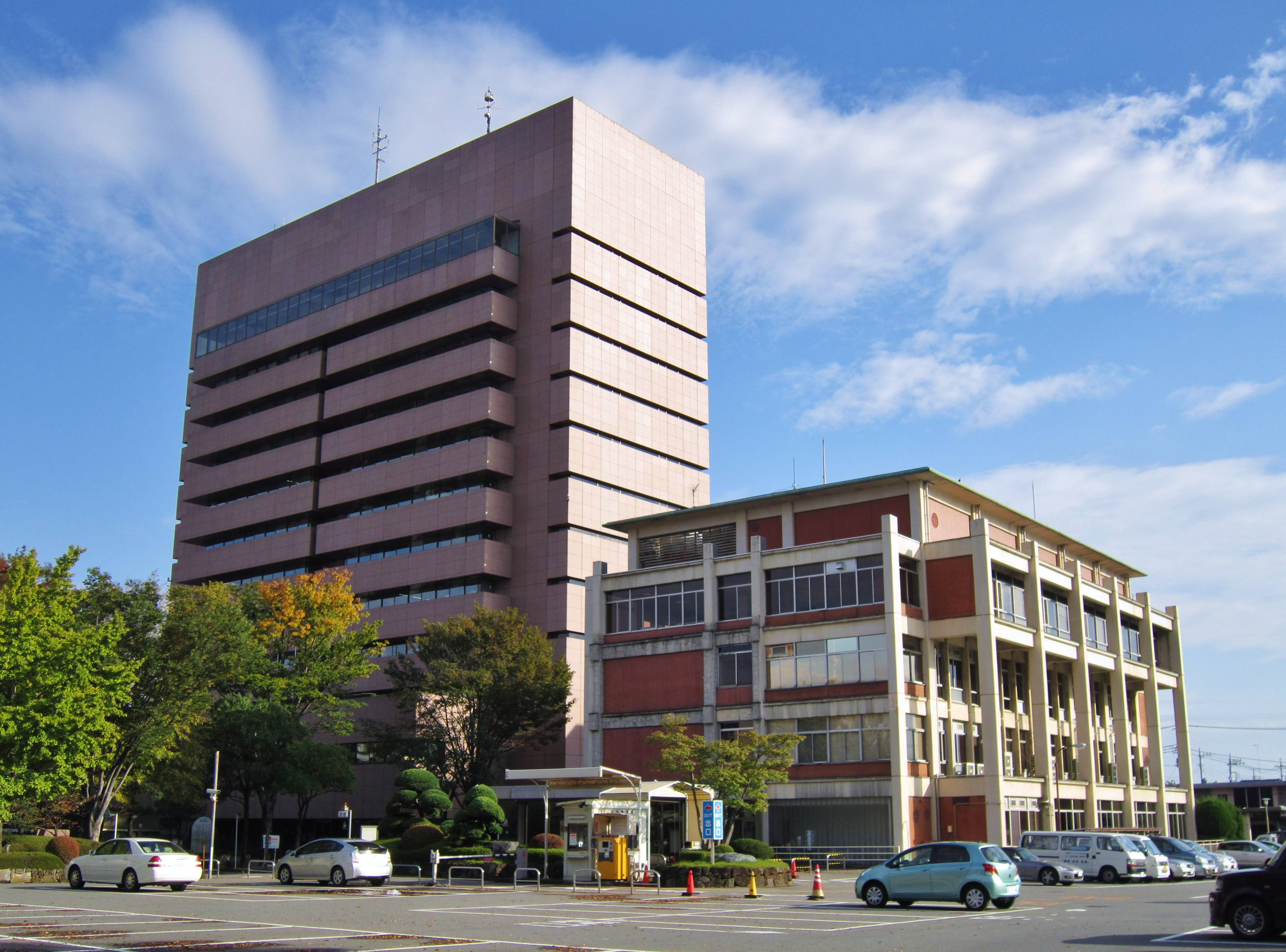
Maebashi City Hall

Maebashi (前橋市, Maebashi-shi; Japanese pronunciation: [mä̀.é̞.bä̀.ɕì, mä́.è̞.bä̀.ɕì, mä̀.é̞.bä́.ɕí.ɕì, -ɕi̥.ɕì]) is the capital city of Gunma Prefecture, in the northern Kantō region of Japan. As of 31 August 2020, the city had an estimated population of 335,352 in 151,171 households, and a population density of 1100 persons per km^{2}. The total area of the city is 311.59 km^{2} (120.31 sq mi). It was the most populous city within Gunma Prefecture until Takasaki merged with nearby towns between 2006 and 2009. Maebashi is known to be the "City of Water, Greenery and Poets" because of its pure waters, its rich nature and because it gave birth to several Japanese contemporary poets, such as Sakutarō Hagiwara.

== Etymology ==
The Maebashi area was called Umayabashi (厩橋) during the Nara period. This name finds its origins in the fact that there was a bridge (hashi, 橋) crossing the Tone River and not far from the bridge there was a small refreshment house with a stable (umaya, 駅家), often used by people travelling on the Tōzan-dō (the road connecting the capital to the eastern regions of Japan). The spelling was officially changed into Maebashi (前橋) in 1649 during the Edo period when Maebashi became a castle town and the center of Maebashi Domain, a feudal domain under the Tokugawa shogunate.

== History ==
The town of Maebashi was established within Higashigunma District, Gunma Prefecture on April 1, 1889, with the creation of the modern municipalities system after the Meiji Restoration. Maebashi was raised to city status on April 1, 1892. In 1901, it annexed a portion of Kamikawabuchi village from Seta District.

On August 5, 1945, approximately 64.2% of the urban core of the city was destroyed during World War II during air raids which followed the dropping of propaganda leaflets warning of the impending attacks.

In 1951, a portion of Kaigaya Village from Seta District was merged into Maebashi. The city expanded further on April 1, 1954, by annexing the villages of Kamikawabuchi, Shimokawabuchi, Azuma, Minamitachibana, Kaigaya, Haga, Motosōja, and Sōja from Seta District, followed by a portion of Jōnan village in 1957. On April 1, 1960, a portion of Tamamura Town and another portion of Jōnan village were merged into Maebashi, which finally annexed the remainder of Jōnan village in 1967.

Maebashi hosted the 1999 IAAF World Indoor Championships.

On April 1, 2001, Maebashi was designated a special city (tokureishi) with increased local autonomy.

On December 5, 2004, the town of Ōgo, as well as the villages of Kasukawa and Miyagi (all from Seta District), were merged into Maebashi. On May 5, 2009, the village of Fujimi (Seta District) was merged into Maebashi. Seta District was dissolved as a result of this merger.

Maebashi became a core city (Chūkakushi) on April 1, 2009.

== Geography ==
Maebashi is located at the foot of Mount Akagi in the northeast corner of the Kantō Plain. It is also surrounded by Mount Haruna and Mount Myōgi. Two rivers run through the city: the Tone River, Japan's second-longest, and the Hirose River. Although it is located inland more than 100 kilometers away from the coast, the elevation of the southern part of the city is only around 100 meters. The highest elevation is 1823 meters above sea level on the south side of Mt. Kurohino, a peak of Mount Akagi. Maebashi is the farthest from the sea (about 120 km) of all Japanese prefectural capitals. The surrounding cities comprise an urban zone of over 1 million people, separated by farmland to the south from the built up areas of Greater Tokyo.

=== Surrounding municipalities ===
Gunma Prefecture

- Isesaki
- Kiryū
- Numata
- Shibukawa
- Shintō
- Takasaki
- Tamamura
- Yoshioka

=== Climate ===
Maebashi has a humid subtropical climate (Köppen climate classification Cfa). In the winter, the karakkaze, or "dry wind" blows through Maebashi from the north. This is due to the snow clouds coming from the Sea of Japan being blocked by the Echigo Mountain Range between Gunma and Niigata Prefectures. Because of this, the city has a dry winter and is one of the sunniest places in Japan at over 2,210 hours of sunshine per year. In the summer, it is hot since the location is inland, although less hot than coastal Tokyo on average. On July 24, 2001, Maebashi hit 40 °C (104 °F), the fifth-hottest temperature ever in Japan.

Climate data for Maebashi (1991−2020 normals, extremes 1896−present)
Month	Jan	Feb	Mar	Apr	May	Jun	Jul	Aug	Sep	Oct	Nov	Dec	Year
Record high °C (°F)	22.0 (71.6)	24.6 (76.3)	27.4 (81.3)	32.4 (90.3)	36.5 (97.7)	39.5 (103.1)	40.0 (104.0)	41.0 (105.8)	38.4 (101.1)	33.0 (91.4)	27.3 (81.1)	25.2 (77.4)	41.0 (105.8)
Mean maximum °C (°F)	15.3 (59.5)	18.3 (64.9)	22.0 (71.6)	27.4 (81.3)	31.4 (88.5)	33.5 (92.3)	37.1 (98.8)	37.2 (99.0)	34.2 (93.6)	28.7 (83.7)	22.8 (73.0)	18.3 (64.9)	38.1 (100.6)
Mean daily maximum °C (°F)	9.1 (48.4)	10.0 (50.0)	13.5 (56.3)	19.3 (66.7)	24.2 (75.6)	26.8 (80.2)	30.5 (86.9)	31.7 (89.1)	27.3 (81.1)	21.7 (71.1)	16.4 (61.5)	11.5 (52.7)	20.2 (68.4)
Daily mean °C (°F)	3.7 (38.7)	4.5 (40.1)	7.9 (46.2)	13.4 (56.1)	18.6 (65.5)	22.1 (71.8)	25.8 (78.4)	26.8 (80.2)	22.9 (73.2)	17.1 (62.8)	11.2 (52.2)	6.1 (43.0)	15.0 (59.0)
Mean daily minimum °C (°F)	−0.5 (31.1)	0.0 (32.0)	3.1 (37.6)	8.2 (46.8)	13.6 (56.5)	18.0 (64.4)	22.0 (71.6)	23.0 (73.4)	19.3 (66.7)	13.2 (55.8)	6.9 (44.4)	1.9 (35.4)	10.7 (51.3)
Mean minimum °C (°F)	−4.4 (24.1)	−4.1 (24.6)	−1.6 (29.1)	1.7 (35.1)	7.6 (45.7)	13.2 (55.8)	18.4 (65.1)	18.9 (66.0)	13.5 (56.3)	7.1 (44.8)	1.4 (34.5)	−2.3 (27.9)	−4.8 (23.4)
Record low °C (°F)	−11.8 (10.8)	−9.0 (15.8)	−7.8 (18.0)	−3.1 (26.4)	0.3 (32.5)	6.0 (42.8)	11.9 (53.4)	13.6 (56.5)	8.4 (47.1)	0.6 (33.1)	−3.5 (25.7)	−7.4 (18.7)	−11.8 (10.8)
Average precipitation mm (inches)	29.7 (1.17)	26.5 (1.04)	58.3 (2.30)	74.8 (2.94)	99.4 (3.91)	147.8 (5.82)	202.1 (7.96)	195.6 (7.70)	204.3 (8.04)	142.2 (5.60)	43.0 (1.69)	23.8 (0.94)	1,247.4 (49.11)
Average snowfall cm (inches)	8 (3.1)	9 (3.5)	2 (0.8)	0 (0)	0 (0)	0 (0)	0 (0)	0 (0)	0 (0)	0 (0)	0 (0)	1 (0.4)	19 (7.5)
Average precipitation days (≥ 0.5 mm)	3.5	4.4	8.3	9.0	10.6	14.5	16.6	14.0	13.4	9.9	6.1	3.8	114.2
Average relative humidity (%)	54	52	52	55	60	70	73	72	72	68	62	57	62
Mean monthly sunshine hours	213.1	201.2	211.0	205.2	197.4	138.5	146.3	167.7	134.9	155.6	181.0	202.0	2,153.7
Source: Japan Meteorological Agency

== Demographics ==
Historical population
Year	Pop.	±%
1920	51,015	—
1930	53,052	+4.0%
1940	52,898	−0.3%
1950	68,710	+29.9%
1960	240,301	+249.7%
1970	273,864	+14.0%
1980	311,121	+13.6%
1990	335,704	+7.9%
2000	341,738	+1.8%
2010	340,390	−0.4%
2020	332,149	−2.4%

Per Japanese census data, the population of Maebashi has recently plateaued after a long period of growth.

== Government ==
Maebashi has a mayor-council form of government with a directly elected mayor and a unicameral city council of 38 members. Maebashi contributes eight members to the Gunma Prefectural Assembly. In terms of national politics, the city is part of Gunma 1st district of the lower house of the Diet of Japan.

== Successive mayors ==
Period	Mayor	Term start	Term end
1	Zentarō Shimomura	May 19, 1892	June 2, 1893
2	Tomojirō Yashiro	July 22, 1893	September 23, 1898
3	Gen Sasaji	November 11, 1898	May 9, 1902
4	ShūSaku Inaba	June 13, 1902	January 14, 1909
5	Keizaburo Ehara	February 28, 1909	September 20, 1911
6	Teppei Kon	October 23, 1911	June 14, 1913
7	Jirō Kimura	August 30, 1913	August 30, 1925
8	Katsuzō Takeuchi	September 16, 1925	October 26, 1930
9	Ineichi Tanaka	November 7, 1930	December 9, 1933
10-11	Keizaburō Ehara	December 24, 1933	December 23, 1941
12	Yasuo Hori	February 23, 1942	November 13, 1946
13-14	SAhikō Sekiguchi	April 5, 1947	May 31, 1958
15-19	Shigemaru Ishii	July 12, 1958	July 11, 1978
20-22	Seiichi Fujii	July 12, 1978	January 11, 1988
23-24	Kiyota Fujishima	February 28, 1988	February 27, 1996
25-26	Yasoji Hagiwara	February 28, 1996	February 27, 2004
27-28	Masao Takagi	February 28, 2004	February 27, 2012
29-31	Ryu Yamamoto	February 28, 2012	February 27, 2024
32	Akira Ogawa	February 28, 2024	ongoing

Source:Maebashi City

== Economy ==
A map showing Maebashi Metropolitan Employment Area.

As of 2010, Greater Maebashi, Maebashi Metropolitan Employment Area, has a GDP of US$59.8 billion. The air conditioning system and compressor manufacturing company Sanden Corporation as well as the tofu and tofu products company Sagamiya Foods have manufacturing sites in the city. The Gunma Bank is headquartered in Maebashi.

== Education ==
=== Universities ===
- Maebashi Institute of Technology
- Maebashi Kyoai Gakuen College
- Gunma Prefectural College of Health Sciences
- Gunma University
- Gunma University of Health and Welfare

=== Primary and secondary schools ===
Maebashi has 54 public elementary schools and 21 public middle schools operated by the city government, and two private elementary and two private middle schools. The city has nine public high schools operated by the Gunma Prefectural Board of Education and one by the city government. There are five private high schools and one private combined middle/high school.

International schools:

- Gunma Korean Elementary and Junior High School (群馬朝鮮初中級学校) – North Korean school

== Transportation ==
=== Railway ===
JR East – Jōetsu Line

- Shin-Maebashi - Gumma-Sōja

JR East – Ryōmō Line

- Komagata - Maebashi-Ōshima - Maebashi - Shin-Maebashi
- Jōmō Electric Railway Company – Jōmō Line
  - Chūō-Maebashi - Jōtō - Mitsumata - Katakai - Kamiizumi - Akasaka - Shinzō-Kekkan Center - Egi - Ōgo - Higoshi - Kitahara - Araya - Kasukawa - Zen

=== Highway ===
- Kan-etsu Expressway – Maebashi Interchange
- Kita-Kantō Expressway – Maebashi-Minami Interchange
- National Route 17
- National Route 50
- National Route 291
- National Route 353

== Sports ==
Thespa Gunma at Shoda Shoyu Stadium Gunma was originally formed in Kusatsu, but plays in Maebashi due to J.League stadium requirements.

== Local attractions ==
Rinkokaku

- Gunma Prefectural Government Building
- Kōzuke Kokubun-ji ruins, a National Historic Site
- Rinkokaku
- Maebashi Castle
- Maebashi Tōshō-gū
- Shikishima Park

=== Festivals ===
- Ogo Gion Festival

== Notable people ==
- Tōru Furusawa, voice actor
- Great-O-Khan, Japanese professional wrestler (Real Name: Tomoyuki Oka, Nihongo: 岡 倫之, Oka Tomoyuki)
- Sakutarō Hagiwara, poet
- Gran Hamada, Japanese professional wrestler (Real Name: Hiroaki Hamada, Nihongo: 浜田 広秋, Hamada Hiroaki)
- Hajime Hosogai, professional football player
- Shigesato Itoi, game designer, copywriter, essayist, lyricist, and actor
- Hiroshi Iizuka, luthier known for innovations in viola design
- Nobuyuki Kojima, professional football player
- Nigo (Real Name: Tomoaki Nagao, Nihongo: 長尾 智明, Nagao Tomoaki), fashion designer, DJ, record producer, and entrepreneur
- Kamiizumi Nobutsuna, founder of Shinkage-ryū martial arts school and master of Yagyū Munetoshi, who later introduced Shinkage-ryū to Tokugawa Ieyasu.
- Kōhei Oguri, film director and screenwriter
- Tetsuya Ota, race car driver
- Sho Sakurai, singer, actor and newscaster
- Genichiro Sata, politician
- Takashi Shimizu, film director and creator of the Ju-On franchise.
- Atsuko Tanaka, voice actress
- Yutaka Yoshie, professional wrestler

== International relations ==
Maebashi is a member of Cittaslow.

=== Sister cities ===
Maebashi is twinned with:

- Birmingham, United States

In addition, Maebashi has friendly relations with Menasha, United States and Orvieto, Italy.
