= Mao Murakami =

Japanese dancer

Mao Murakami (村上 真魚, Murakami Mao, born June 12, 1995 in Kiryu, Gunma), also known by her stage name Strong Machine 2 (ストロングマシン2号, Sutorongu Mashin Ni-gō), is a Japanese J-pop dancer known for her robotic and machine-like dance-style. She currently lives with her family in a Buddhist temple. Her father, who is a priest at the temple, is also known by his stage name of Strong Machine 1. The two often team up to perform.

She has appeared on multiple television programs in Japan, including fifteen appearances on the Super Chample dance variety show on CTV. Murakami was featured in the music video for the 2006 single I My Me Mine by the Japanese new wave band Polysics.

Murakami appeared as a gas flame in a series of promotions for G-line Toyama, a natural gas and propane company in Japan.
