= Kiryū, Gunma =

Kiryū 桐生市
- City
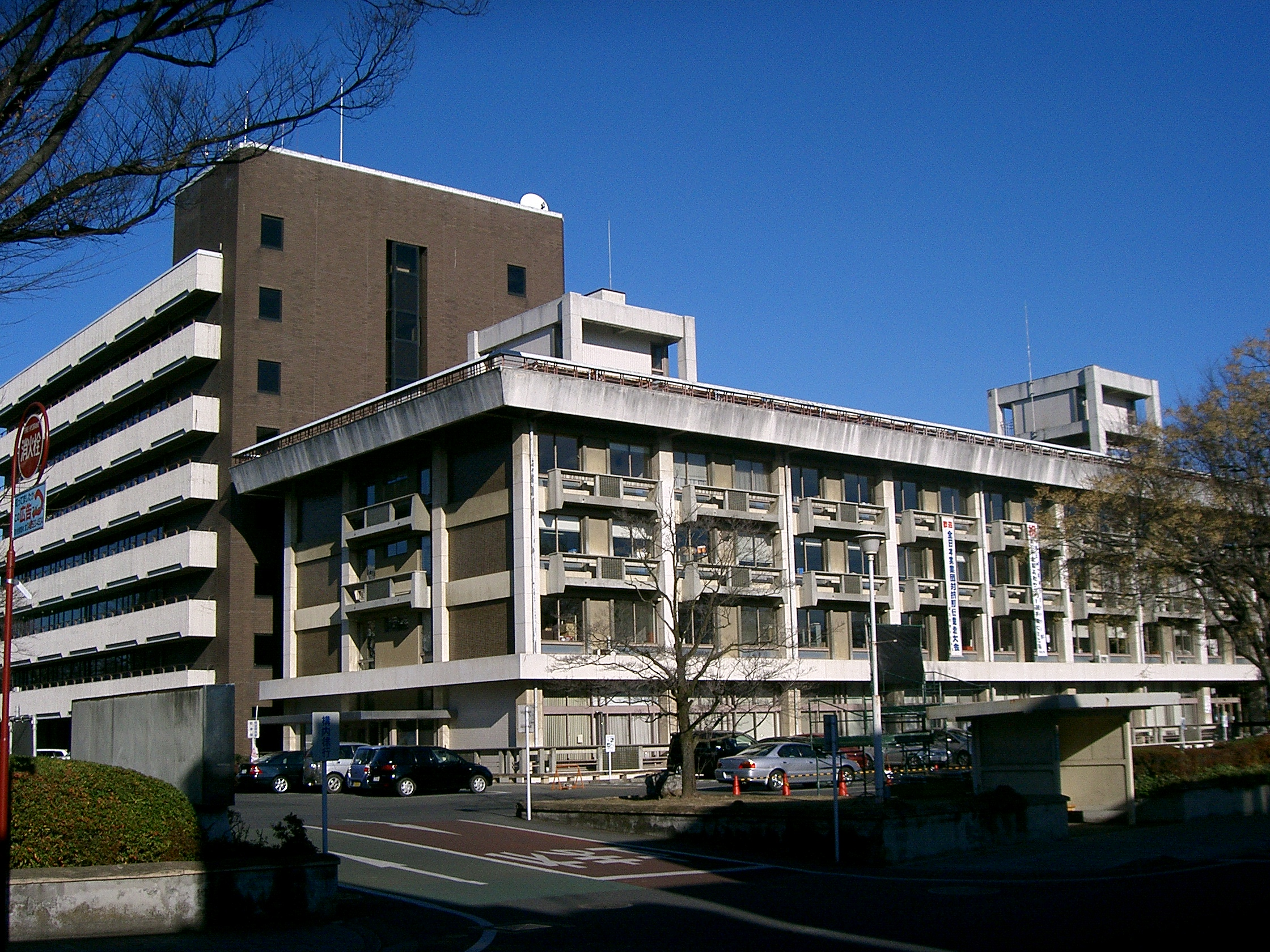
- Kiryū city hall

- Flag Seal

- Location of Kiryū in Gunma Prefecture

- Coordinates: 36°24′18.6″N 139°29′50.1″E
- Country: Japan
- Region: Kantō
- Prefecture: Gunma

Area
  - Total: 274.45 km^{2} (105.97 sq mi)

Population (July 2020)
  - Total: 108,991
  - Density: 397.13/km^{2} (1,028.5/sq mi)
- Time zone: UTC+9 (Japan Standard Time)
- Phone number: 0277-46-1111
- Address: 1-1 Orihimechō, Kiryū-shi, Gunma-ken 376-8501
- Climate: Cfa
- Website: Official website
- Symbols
- Flower: Salvia splendens
- Tree: Sweet Osmanthus

Kiryū (桐生市, Kiryū-shi) is a city located in Gunma Prefecture, Japan. As of 31 July 2020, the city had an estimated population of 108,991 in 49,745 households, and a population density of 400 persons per km^{2}. The total area of the city is 274.45 square kilometres (105.97 sq mi).

== Geography ==
Kiryū is in the southeast part of Gunma, in the northern Kantō Plain near the Tochigi border. It is located approximately 100 kilometres (62 mi) northwest of Tokyo. The city is also not far from Mount Akagi, a large but dormant volcano. The city consists of two separate geographic areas, with the city of Midori sandwiched in between. Situated at the foot of Mount Akagi, the city boasts one of the most beautiful settings in the Kantō region. Two rivers, the Kiryū and the Watarase River, run through the heart of the city and it is likewise surrounded by picturesque mountains to the north. Umeda, a district on the north side of the city, is well known for its cedar trees, while red pines are also common in other areas.

=== Surrounding municipalities ===
Gunma Prefecture

- Isesaki
- Maebashi
- Midori
- Numata
- Ōta

Tochigi Prefecture

- Ashikaga
- Sano

=== Climate ===
Kiryū has a humid subtropical climate (Köppen Cfa) characterized by warm summers and cold winters with heavy snowfall. The average annual temperature in Kiryū is 14.1 °C (57.4 °F). The average annual rainfall is 1,297 mm (51.06 in) with September as the wettest month. The temperatures are highest on average in August, at around 26.4 °C (79.5 °F), and lowest in January, at around 2.8 °C (37.0 °F).

Climate data for Kiryū (1991−2020 normals, extremes 1976−present)
Month	Jan	Feb	Mar	Apr	May	Jun	Jul	Aug	Sep	Oct	Nov	Dec	Year
Record high °C (°F)	18.7 (65.7)	25.0 (77.0)	27.3 (81.1)	32.2 (90.0)	35.4 (95.7)	39.8 (103.6)	40.4 (104.7)	41.2 (106.2)	39.0 (102.2)	33.1 (91.6)	27.6 (81.7)	24.1 (75.4)	39.9 (103.8)
Mean daily maximum °C (°F)	9.0 (48.2)	9.9 (49.8)	13.6 (56.5)	19.2 (66.6)	24.0 (75.2)	26.6 (79.9)	30.2 (86.4)	31.6 (88.9)	27.4 (81.3)	21.7 (71.1)	16.4 (61.5)	11.4 (52.5)	20.1 (68.2)
Daily mean °C (°F)	3.4 (38.1)	4.3 (39.7)	7.8 (46.0)	13.2 (55.8)	18.1 (64.6)	21.5 (70.7)	25.2 (77.4)	26.2 (79.2)	22.5 (72.5)	16.7 (62.1)	10.8 (51.4)	5.7 (42.3)	14.6 (58.3)
Mean daily minimum °C (°F)	−1.8 (28.8)	−1.1 (30.0)	2.3 (36.1)	7.5 (45.5)	12.7 (54.9)	17.2 (63.0)	21.1 (70.0)	22.2 (72.0)	18.6 (65.5)	12.4 (54.3)	5.7 (42.3)	0.5 (32.9)	9.8 (49.6)
Record low °C (°F)	−7.6 (18.3)	−8.6 (16.5)	−8.3 (17.1)	−2.2 (28.0)	3.2 (37.8)	9.5 (49.1)	11.3 (52.3)	14.5 (58.1)	8.3 (46.9)	2.1 (35.8)	−2.7 (27.1)	−7.6 (18.3)	−8.6 (16.5)
Average precipitation mm (inches)	33.2 (1.31)	28.4 (1.12)	63.9 (2.52)	83.9 (3.30)	110.0 (4.33)	152.8 (6.02)	201.3 (7.93)	180.1 (7.09)	178.6 (7.03)	155.3 (6.11)	53.1 (2.09)	28.5 (1.12)	1,269.1 (49.96)
Average precipitation days (≥ 1.0 mm)	3.5	4.0	7.8	8.8	10.3	13.2	14.7	12.1	12.0	9.6	6.0	3.8	105.8
Mean monthly sunshine hours	223.0	210.4	210.5	203.9	194.5	136.2	150.7	177.0	137.9	153.6	183.2	204.3	2,185.1
Source: Japan Meteorological Agency

== Demographics ==
Per Japanese census data, the population of Kiryū peaked around the year 1980 and has declined steadily over the past 50 years.

Historical population
Year	Pop.	±%
1920	37,674	—
1930	52,906	+40.4%
1940	86,086	+62.7%
1950	95,533	+11.0%
1960	138,224	+44.7%
1970	146,489	+6.0%
1980	147,744	+0.9%
1990	142,838	−3.3%
2000	134,298	−6.0%
2010	121,704	−9.4%
2020	106,445	−12.5%

== History ==
Kiryū is located within traditional Kōzuke Province and has been noted since the Nara period for production of fabrics. The place name appears in the Kamakura period Azuma Kagami. During the Edo period, most of the area of present-day Kiryū was part of the tenryō holding under the direct administration of the Tokugawa shogunate, with the exception of the commercial center and temple town of Kiryū-shinmachi, noted for sericulture since the Nara period, which was part of Shōnai Domain of Dewa Province. The area also prospered from its location on the Kiryū and Watarase rivers.

Kiryū Town was created within Yamada District, Gunma Prefecture on April 1, 1889 with the creation of the modern municipalities system after the Meiji Restoration. It was raised to city status on March 1, 1921. Kiryū annexed the neighboring village of Sakaino on April 1, 1933 and village of Hirosawa on April 1, 1937. The city expanded further with the annexation of Umeda, Aioi and part of Kawauchi village on October 1, 1954.

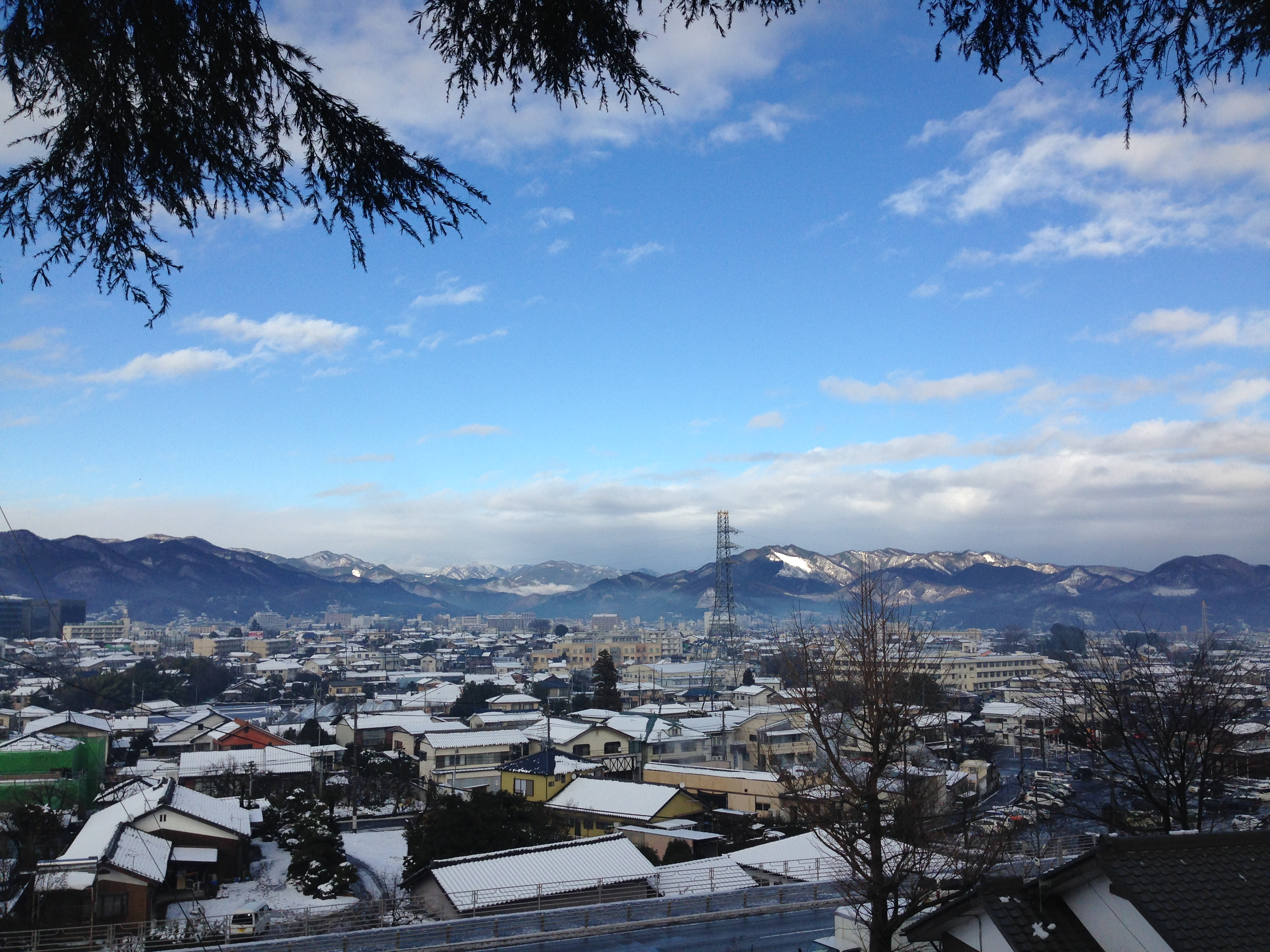
View of Kiryū from the south looking north

On June 13, 2005, Kiryū absorbed the villages of Niisato and Kurohone (both from Seta District).

== Government ==
Kiryū has a mayor-council form of government with a directly elected mayor and a unicameral city council of 22 members. Kiryū contributes three members to the Gunma Prefectural Assembly. In terms of national politics, the city is divided between the Gunma 1st district and the Gunma 2nd district of the lower house of the Diet of Japan.

== Economy ==
Traditionally, Kiryū's principal industry was sericulture and silk textile manufacturing, with records dating silk production as far back as 713 AD. Pachinko manufacturing arrived in Kiryū after World War II, during the period of industrial reconstruction, with the formation of two main companies—the Heiwa Corporation in 1949, and the Sophia Corporation in 1951. Kiryū's factories are responsible for manufacturing 60% of Japan's pachinko machines. However, the decreased demand for silk goods and the closure of several area manufacturing concerns have caused the local economy to suffer.

Mitsuba Corporation, a major manufacturer of automotive parts is headquartered in the city.

== Education ==
Kiryū has 17 public elementary schools and ten public middle schools operated by the city government, and six public high schools operated by the Gunma Prefectural Board of Education. There are also two private middle schools and two private high schools. The prefecture also operates three special education schools for the handicapped. The Engineering department of Gunma University is located in the Tenjin district of the city.

== Transportation ==
=== Railway ===
- JR East – Ryōmō Line
  - Kiryū
- Watarase Keikoku Railway – Watarase Keikoku Line
  - Kiryū - Shimo-Shinden - Aioi - Undō-Kōen – (Ōmama - Kami-Kambai) - Motojuku - Mizunuma
- Jōmō Electric Railway Company - Jōmō Line
  - Niisato - Nikkawa - Higashi-Nikkawa – (Akagi ) - Kiryū-Kyūjō-Mae - Tennōjuku - Fujiyamashita - Maruyamashita - Nishi-Kiryū
- Tōbu Railway – Tōbu Kiryū Line
  - Shin-Kiryū - Aioi

=== Highway ===
- National Route 50
- National Route 122
- National Route 353

== Local attractions ==
Having been virtually untouched by bombs during World War II, the city boasts one of the greatest concentrations of pre-war architecture in all of Japan.

- Gunma Insect World
- Kiryu Motorboat Race Course
- Kiryu Nature Sanctuary
- Kiryugaoka Amusement Park
- Kiryugaoka Zoo
- Okawa Museum of Art
- Takei temple ruins, National Historic Site
- Tenmangu Shrine
- Textile Museum Yukari

=== Saw-tooth roof structures ===
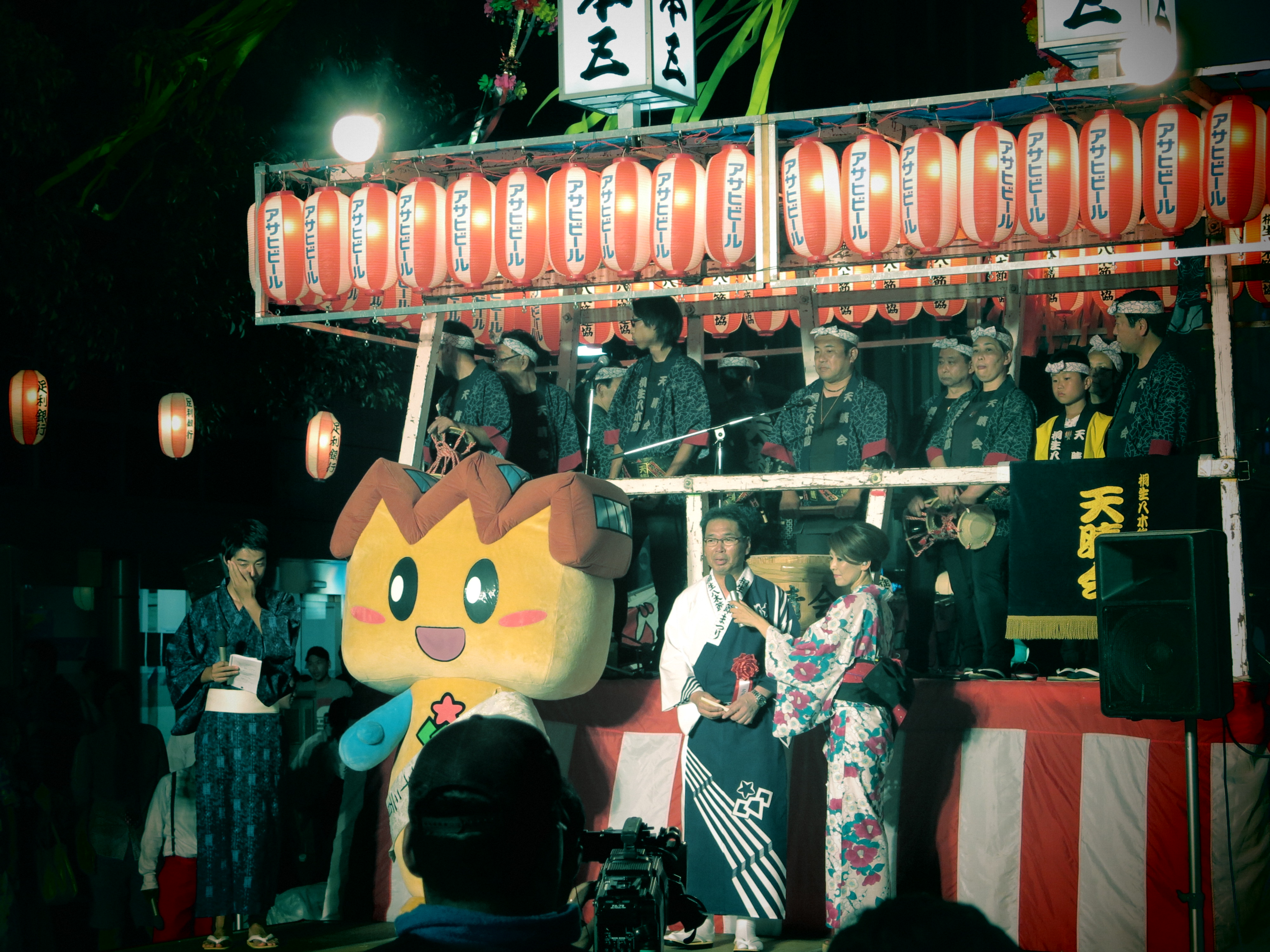
Kinopi, mascot of Kiryu city

Kiryu is especially known in the area for saw-tooth roof structures. The official mascot of Kiryu city is a saw-tooth themed character named Kinopi (キノピー). Many of these saw-tooth structures are still in use today, re-purposed for various businesses.

== The Silk Weaver’s Apprentice and the Kiryu Spirit (Manga Series) ==
Kiryū City officially released a manga titled The Silk Weaver’s Apprentice and the Kiryū Spirit in collaboration with Tokyo-based publisher Manga Planet. The series is being simultaneously released in both English and Japanese on Manga Planet's official website. According to website, in the manga Princess Shirataki, the spirit of the Kiryū traditional weaving art, takes the form of a young girl and appears suddenly before an apprentice of the Kiryū tradition and his childhood friend, a girl going to Tokyo College of Art. These three live together, learn the seven techniques of the Kiryū art and discover how to use it in modern-day fashion.

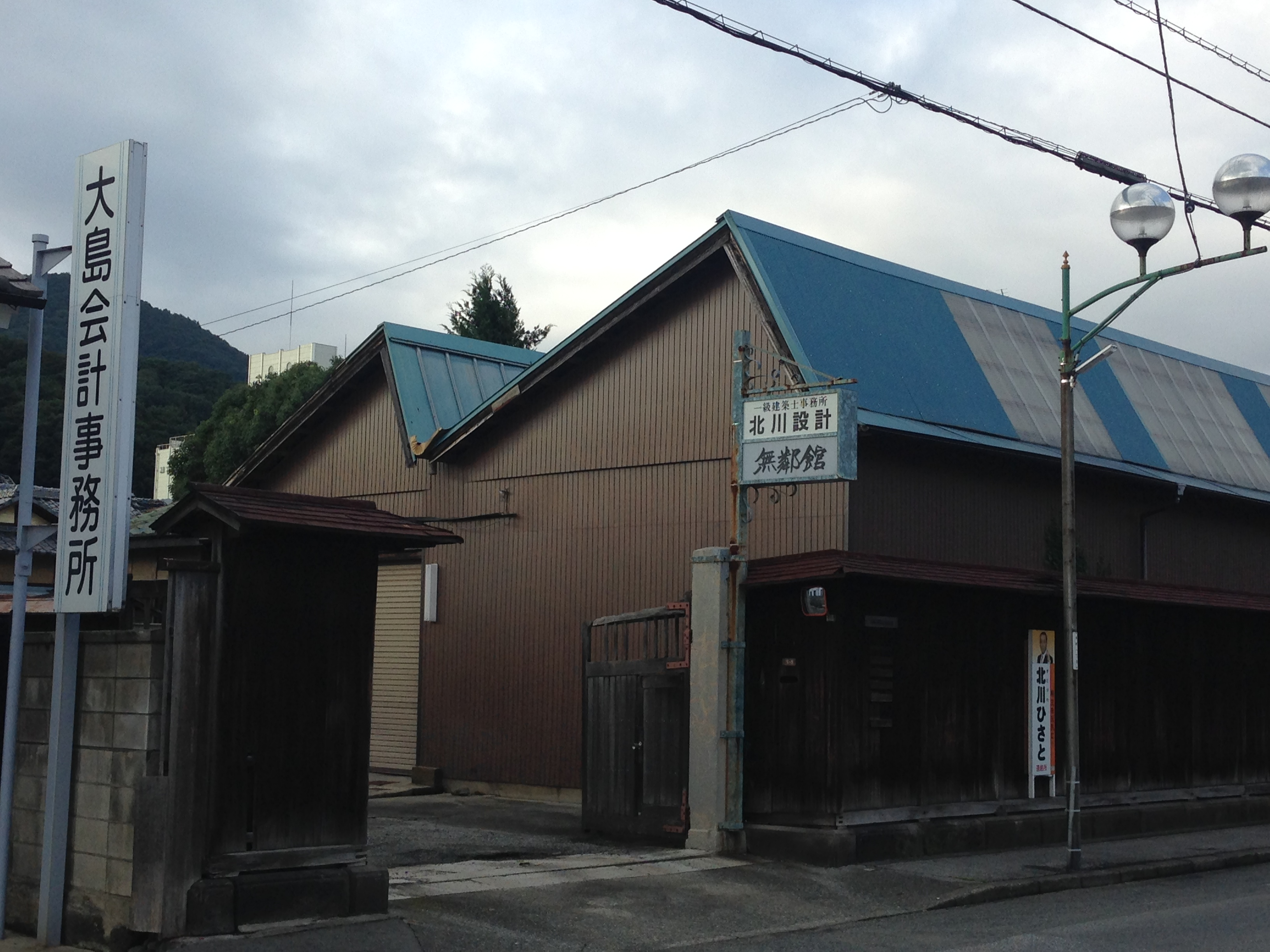
Saw-tooth roof structure in Kiryu, Gunma, Japan

== Sister cities ==
- (Japan) Hitachi, Ibaraki, since June 18, 1965
- Biella, Piemonte, Italy, since October 12, 1963
- Columbus, Georgia, United States, since June 16, 1977
- (Japan) Naruto, Tokushima, since September 18, 1980

== Notable people ==
- Yukio Araki (1928-1945), youngest-known Japanese Kamikaze pilot killed in World War II
- Kenkichi Iwasawa (1917-1998), mathematician
- Naoki Matsuda (1977-2011), professional football player
- Mao Murakami (born 1995), dancer
- Shūzō Oshimi (born 1981), manga writer and artist
- Ryoko Shinohara (born 1973), actress
- Jun Takahashi (born 1969), Japanese fashion designer and founder of UNDERCOVER
- Chihiro Yamanaka (born 1976), pianist
- Saori Yuki (born 1948), singer
