= Jōmō Line =

Railway line in Gunma Prefecture, Japan

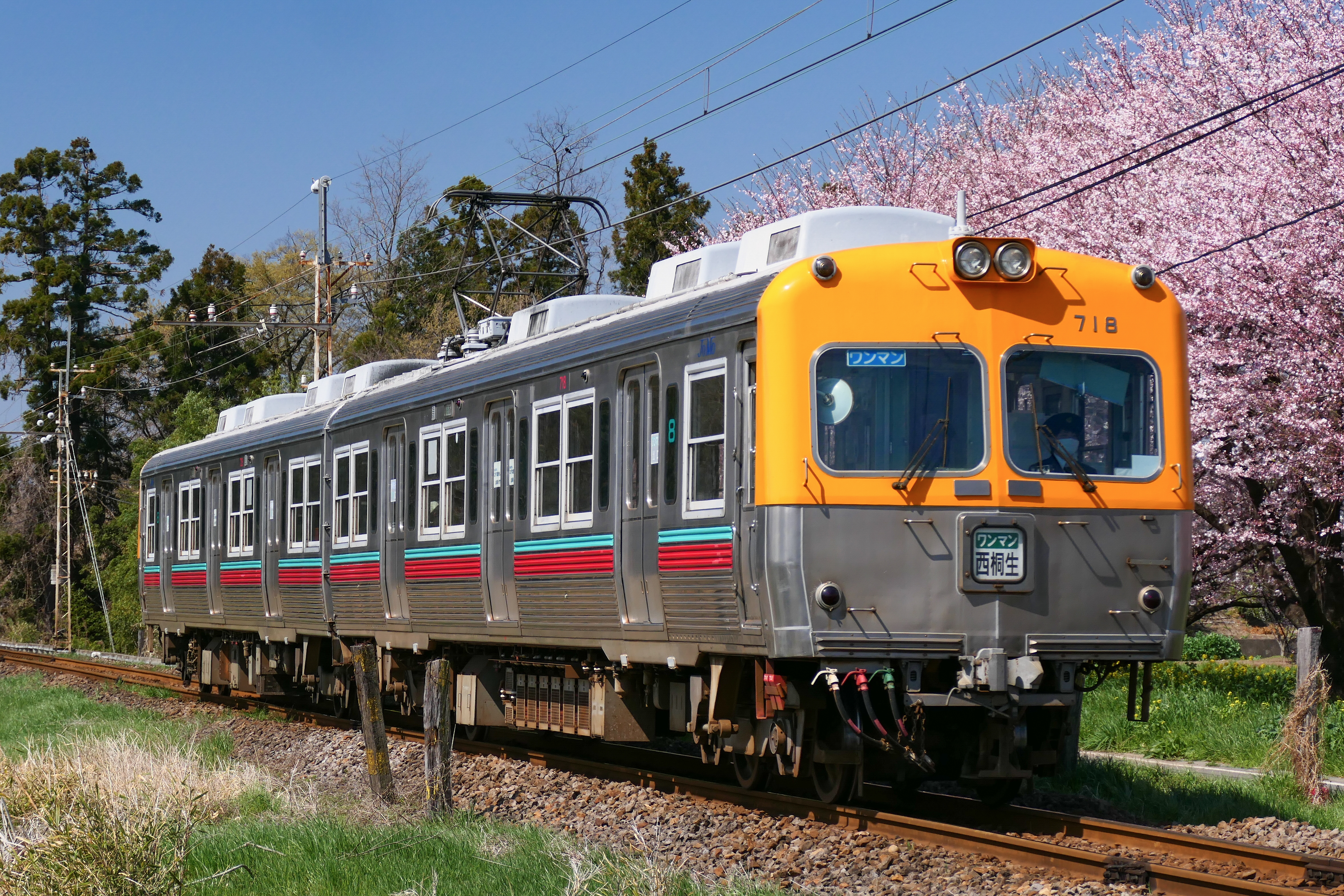
- Jōmō Electric Railway 700 series train in April 2022

Overview
- Native name: 上毛線
- Termini: Chūō-Maebashi; Nishi-Kiryū
- Connecting lines: Tōbu Kiryū Line

History
- Opened: November 10, 1928

Technical
- Line length: 25.4 km (15.8 mi)
- Electrification: Overhead catenary 1,500 V

The Jōmō Line (上毛線, Jōmō-sen) is a railway line in Gunma Prefecture, Japan, operated by Jōmō Electric Railway Company (上毛電気鉃道 Jōmō Denki Tetsudō), also known as Jomo Dentetsu. It runs between Maebashi and Kiryū and is 25.4 km long. Eighteen of its stations opened on November 10, 1928, with one station added in each of the years 1933, 1939, 1993, and 1994.

== History ==
The entire line opened in 1928, electrified at 1500 V DC. Freight services ceased in 1986. In April 2025, the railway aimed to be compatible with IC cards by the next winter. Implementation started on 2026-01-15.

== Station list ==
All stations are in Gunma Prefecture.

Station	Japanese	Distance (km)		Transfers	Location
Station	Japanese	Between stations	Total	Transfers	Location
Chūō-Maebashi	中央前橋	-	0.0	Ryōmō Line (Maebashi)	Maebashi
Jōtō	城東	0.8	0.8		Maebashi
Mitsumata	三俣	0.8	1.6		Maebashi
Katakai	片貝	0.6	2.2		Maebashi
Kamiizumi	上泉	1.0	3.2		Maebashi
Akasaka	赤坂	1.1	4.3		Maebashi
Shinzō-Kekkan Center	心臓血管センター	1.3	5.6		Maebashi
Egi	江木	0.6	6.2		Maebashi
Ōgo	大胡	2.1	8.3		Maebashi
Higoshi	樋越	1.6	9.9		Maebashi
Kitahara	北原	1.0	10.9		Maebashi
Araya	新屋	1.1	12.0		Maebashi
Kasukawa	粕川	1.3	13.3		Maebashi
Zen	膳	1.0	14.3		Maebashi
Niisato	新里	1.5	15.8		Kiryū
Nikkawa	新川	1.9	17.7		Kiryū
Higashi-Nikkawa	東新川	1.0	18.7		Kiryū
Akagi	赤城	0.9	19.6	Tōbu Kiryū Line; Watarase Keikoku Line (Ōmama)	Midori
Kiryū-Kyūjō-Mae	桐生球場前	2.2	21.8	Watarase Keikoku Line (Undō-Kōen)	Kiryū
Tennōjuku	天王宿	1.0	22.8		Kiryū
Fujiyamashita	富士山下	0.9	23.7		Kiryū
Maruyamashita	丸山下	0.6	24.3		Kiryū
Nishi-Kiryū	西桐生	1.1	25.4	Ryōmō Line (Kiryū); Watarase Keikoku Line (Kiryū)	Kiryū

== Rolling stock ==
The line operates using transferred trains from other companies.

- 100 series EMU car (special event use only)
- 700 series 2-car EMUs (x8) (former Keio 3000 series)
- 800 series 2-car EMUs (former Tokyo Metro 03 series)
