= Nishi-Kiryū Station =

Railway station in Kiryū, Gunma Prefecture, Japan

Nishi-Kiryū Station 西桐生駅
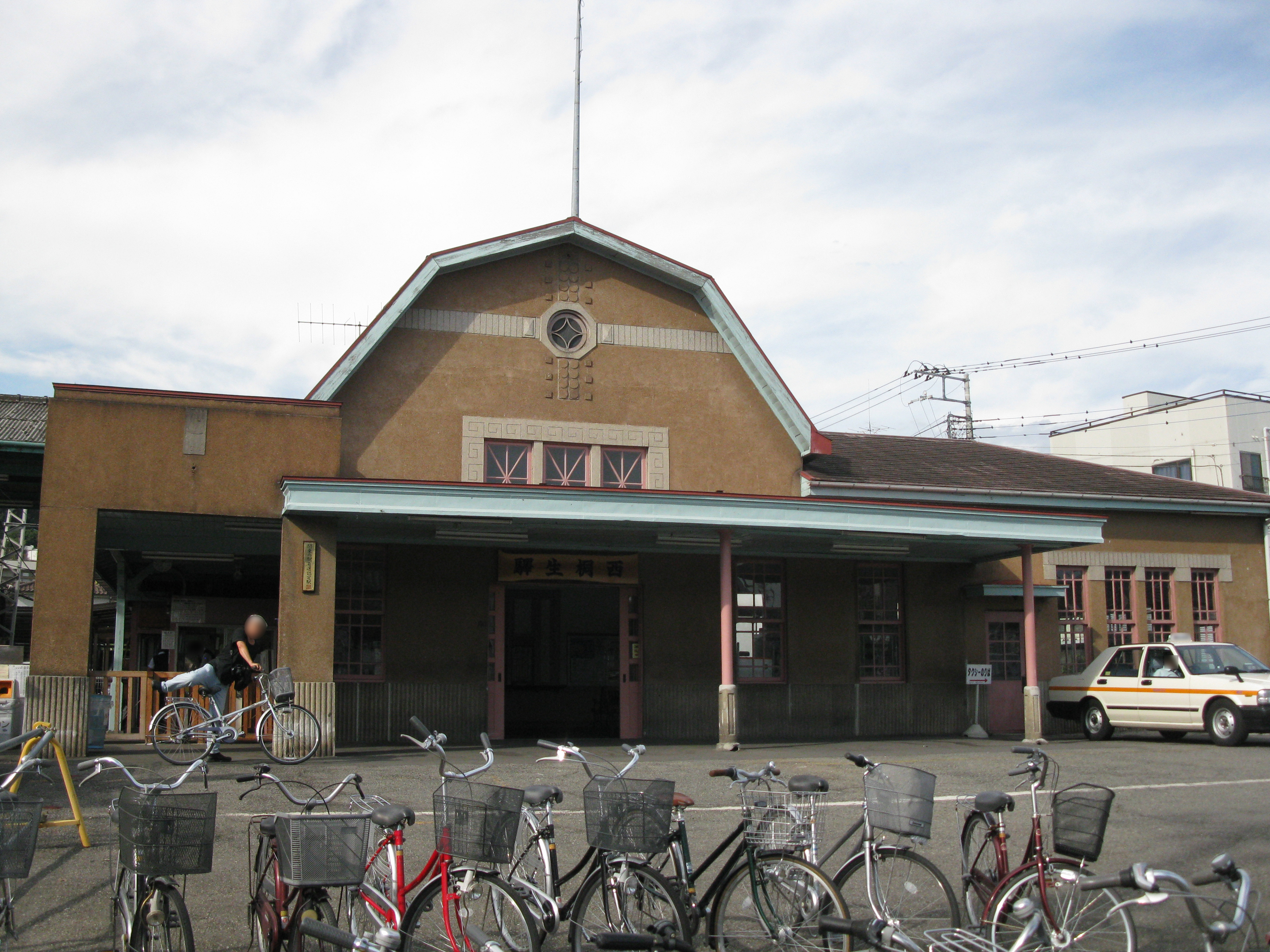
- Nishi-Kiryū Station in September 2010

General information
- Location: 2-1-33 Miyamaechō, Kiryū-shi, Gunma-ken 376-0046; Japan
- Coordinates: 36.4141°N 139.3328°E
- Operator: Jōmō Electric Railway Company
- Line: ■ Jōmō Line
- Distance: 25.4 km from Chūō-Maebashi
- Platforms: 1 island platform
- Tracks: 2

Other information
- Status: Staffed
- Website: Official website

History
- Opened: November 10, 1928

Passengers
- FY2019: 1633

Services
Preceding station	Jōmō Electric Railway	Following station
Maruyamashita towards Chūō-Maebashi	Jōmō Line	Terminus
Location
- Location within Gunma Prefecture Location within Japan

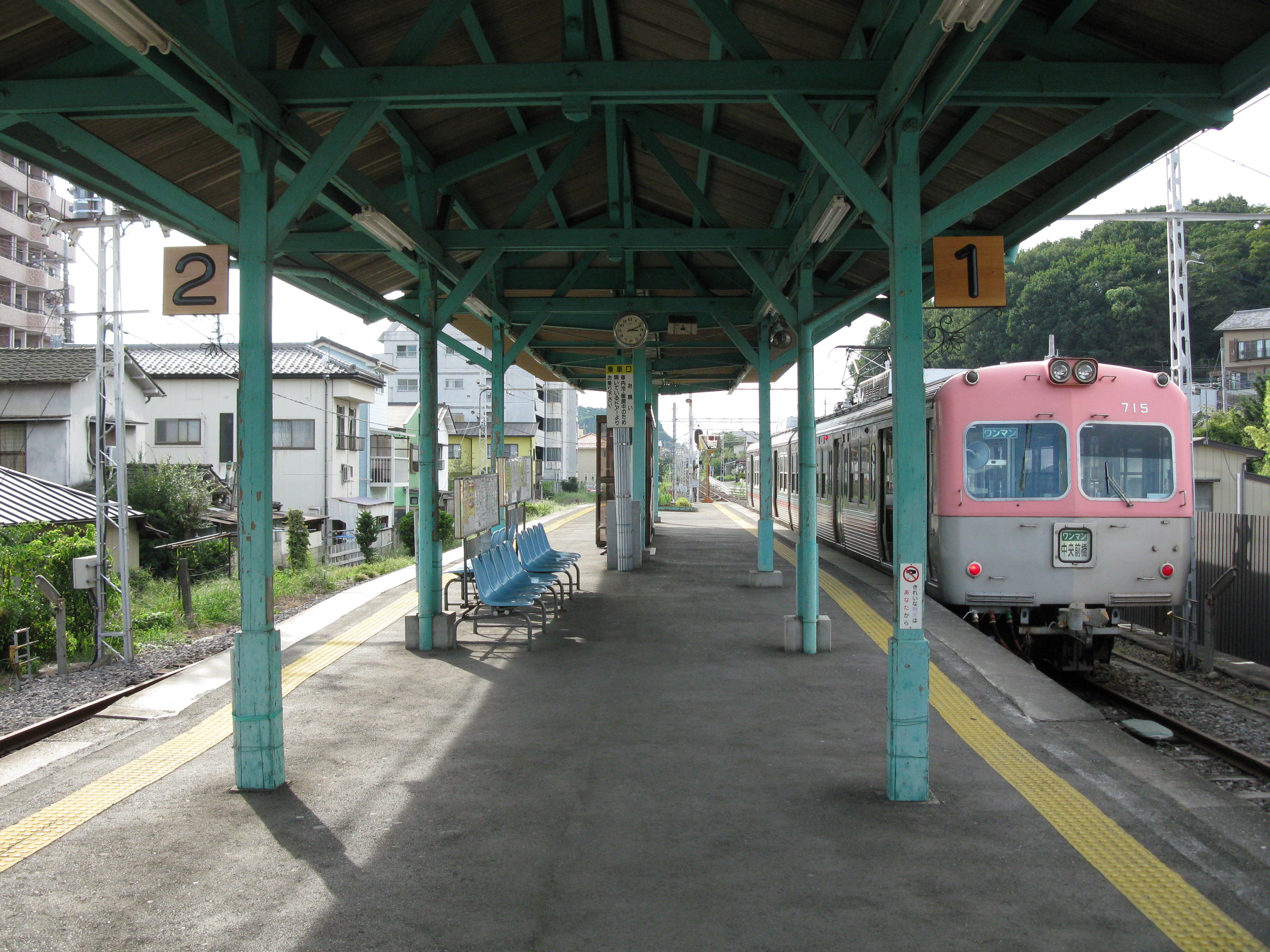
Platform

Nishi-Kiryū Station (西桐生駅, Nishi-Kiryū-eki) is a passenger railway station in the city of Kiryū, Gunma, Japan, operated by the private railway operator Jōmō Electric Railway Company.

== Lines ==
Nishi-Kiryū Station is a terminal station on the Jōmō Line, and is located 25.4 kilometers from the opposing terminus of the line at Chūō-Maebashi.

== Station layout ==
Nishi-Kiryū Station has one island platform serving two dead-headed tracks. The station is attended.

=== Platforms ===
1	■ Jōmō Line	for Chūō-Maebashi
2	■ Jōmō Line	for Chūō-Maebashi

== History ==
Nishi-Kiryū Station was opened on November 10, 1928. The station platform received protection as a Registered Tangible Cultural Property in 2005. and the station building itself also received the same status the same year.

== Passenger statistics ==
In fiscal 2019, the station was used by an average of 1633 passengers daily (boarding passengers only).

== Surrounding area ==
- Kiryū City Hall
- Kiryū Post Office

== See also ==
- List of railway stations in Japan
