= Chūō-Maebashi Station =

Railway station in Maebashi, Gunma Prefecture, Japan

Chūō-Maebashi Station 中央前橋駅
- Chūō-Maebashi Station in January 2026

General information
- Location: Jōtō-machi 3-1-1, Maebashi-shi, Gunma-ken 371-0016; Japan
- Coordinates: 36.3910°N 139.0751°E
- Operator: Jōmō Electric Railway Company
- Line: ■ Jōmō Line
- Distance: 25.4 km from Nishi-Kiryū.
- Platforms: 2 bay platforms

History
- Opened: November 10, 1928

Passengers
- FY2015: 1702

Services
Preceding station	Jōmō Electric Railway	Following station
Terminus	Jōmō Line	Jōtō towards Nishi-Kiryū
Location
- Location within Gunma Prefecture Location within Japan

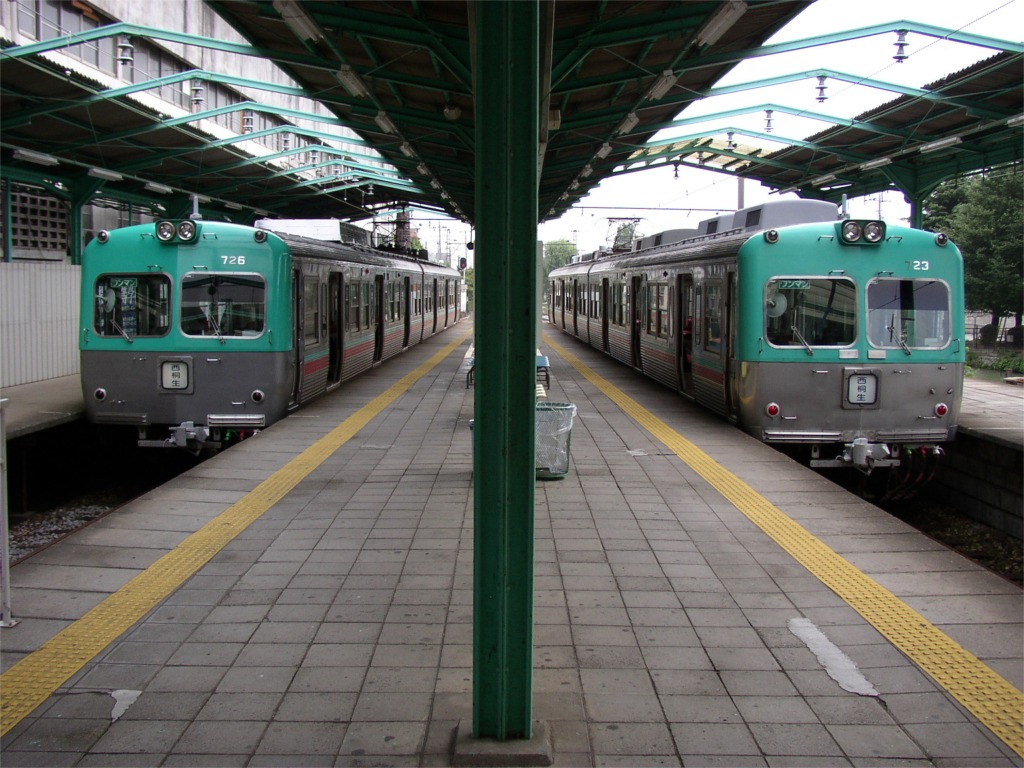
Platform

Chūō-Maebashi Station (中央前橋駅, Chūō-Maebashi-eki) is a passenger railway station in the city of Maebashi, Gunma Prefecture, Japan, operated by the private railway operator Jōmō Electric Railway Company.

== Lines ==
Chūō-Maebashi Station is a terminal station of the Jōmō Line, and is located 25.4 kilometers from the opposing terminus of the line at Nishi-Kiryū.

== Station layout ==
The station consists of a double bay platform serving three tracks.

=== Platforms ===
1,2,3	■ Jōmō Line	for Akagi and Nishi-Kiryū

== History ==
Chūō-Maebashi Station opened on November 10, 1928. The original station building was burned down during the air raid on Maebashi of August 5, 1945.

== Surrounding area ==
- Gunma Prefectural Office
- Maebashi City Hall
- Jōmō Railway company offices
- Maebashi Central Post Office

== See also ==
- List of railway stations in Japan
