= List of high schools in Japan =

The following is a non-comprehensive list of high schools in Japan:

== Prefecture ==
=== Hokkaido ===
- Bushūkan Junior and Senior High School
- Fuji Women's Academy
- Hakodate La Salle Junior High School & Senior High School
- Hokkaido Asahikawa Higashi High School
- Hokkaido Asahikawa Kita High School
- Hokkaido Asahikawa Nishi High School
- Hokkaido Bihoro High School
- Hokkaido Bifuka High School
- Hokkaido Hakodate Chubu High School
- Hokkaido Engaru High School
- Hokkaido Esashi High School
- Hokkaido Iwamizawa Higashi High School
- Hokkaido Kaminokuni High School
- Hokkaido Kitahiroshima High School
- Hokkaido Kitami Hokuto High School
- Hokkaido Korean Primary, Middle and High School
- Hokkaido Kushiro Koryo High School
- Hokkaido Matsumae High School
- Hokkaido Muroran Sakae High School
- Hokkaido Nakashibetsu High School
- Hokkaido Nemuro High School
- Hokkaido Obihiro Hakuyou High School
- Hokkaido Obihiro Sanjyo High School
- Hokkaido Otaru Choryo High school
- Hokkaido Rausu High School
- Hokkaido Rebun High School
- Hokkaido Sapporo Asahigaoka High School
- Hokkaido Sapporo Higashi High School
- Hokkaido Sapporo Intercultural and Technological High School
- Hokkaido Sapporo Kaisei High School
- Hokkaido Sapporo Minami High School
- Hokkaido Sapporo Nishi High School
- Hokkaido Sapporo Teine High School
- Hokkaido Sapporo Tsukisamu High School
- Hokkaido Shibetsu High School
- Hokkaido Sunagawa High School
- Hokkaido Takikawa High School
- Hokkaido Wakkanai High School
- Hokurei Junior & Senior High School
- Iai Joshi Women's Academy
- Sapporo Daiichi High School
- Sapporo Odori High School

=== Aomori ===
- Aomori High School

=== Iwate ===
- List of high schools in Iwate Prefecture

=== Miyagi ===
- List of high schools in Miyagi Prefecture
- Karuma High School

=== Akita ===
- List of high schools in Akita Prefecture
- Akita High School
- Noshiro Technical High School

=== Yamagata ===
- List of high schools in Yamagata Prefecture

=== Fukushima ===
- List of high schools in Fukushima Prefecture

=== Ibaraki ===
- List of high schools in Ibaraki Prefecture

=== Tochigi ===
- List of high schools in Tochigi Prefecture

=== Gunma ===
- List of high schools in Gunma Prefecture

=== Kanagawa ===
- List of high schools in Kanagawa Prefecture

=== Niigata ===
- List of high schools in Niigata Prefecture

=== Toyama ===
- List of high schools in Toyama Prefecture

=== Ishikawa ===
- List of high schools in Ishikawa Prefecture

=== Fukui ===
- List of high schools in Fukui Prefecture

=== Yamanashi ===
- List of high schools in Yamanashi Prefecture

=== Nagano ===
- List of high schools in Nagano Prefecture
- UWC ISAK Japan

=== Gifu ===
- List of high schools in Gifu Prefecture

=== Shizuoka ===
- List of high schools in Shizuoka Prefecture
- Shizuoka Gakuen High School
- Hamamatsu Kaiseikan High School

=== Aichi ===
- List of high schools in Aichi Prefecture

==== Prefectural ====
- Asahigaoka High School
- Meiwa High School
- Chikusa High School
- Tokoname High School
- Yokosuka High School
- Handa High School

=== Mie ===
- List of high schools in Mie Prefecture

==== Public ====
- Mie Prefectural Kuwana Kita High School
- Mie Prefectural Kuwana High School
- Mie Prefectural Kuwana Nishi High School
- Mie Prefectural Kuwana Technical High School
- Mie Prefectural Inabe Sogo Gakuen High School
- Mie Prefectural Asake High School
- Mie Prefectural Kawagoe High School
- Mie Prefectural Yokkaichi High School
- Mie Prefectural Yokkaichi Minami High School
- Mie Prefectural Yokkaichi Nishi High School
- Mie Prefectural Yokkaichi Yogo High School
- Mie Prefectural Yokkaichi Agricultural High School
- Mie Prefectural Yokkaichi Technical High School
- Mie Prefectural Yokkaichi Chuo Technical High School
- Mie Prefectural Yokkaichi Commercial High School
- Mie Prefectural Komono High School
- Mie Prefectural Ishiyakushi High School
- Mie Prefectural Kambe High School
- Mie Prefectural Iino High School
- Mie Prefectural Shiroko High School
- Mie Prefectural Ino High School
- Mie Prefectural Maeyama High School
- Mie Prefectural Tsu High School
- Mie Prefectural Tsu Nishi High School
- Mie Prefectural Tsu Higashi High School
- Mie Prefectural Tsu Technical High School
- Mie Prefectural Tsu Commercial High School
- Mie Prefectural Hisai High School
- Mie Prefectural Hisai Agriculture and Forestry High School
- Mie Prefectural Hakusan High School
- Mie Prefectural Ueno High School
- Mie Prefectural Iga Hakuho High School
- Mie Prefectural Akebo no Gakuen High School
- Mie Prefectural Nabari High School
- Mie Prefectural Nabari Seiho High School
- Mie Prefectural Matsusaka High School
- Mie Prefectural Matsusaka Technical High School
- Mie Prefectural Matsusaka Commercial High School
- Mie Prefectural Iinan High School
- Mie Prefectural Oka High School
- Mie Prefectural Subaru Gakuen High School
- Mie Prefectural Uji-Yamada High School
- Mie Prefectural Ise High School
- Mie Prefectural Ise Technical High School
- Mie Prefectural Uji-Yamada Commercial High School
- Mie Prefectural Akeno High School
- Mie Prefectural Minami-ise High School
  - Mie Prefectural Minami-ise High School Nansei Campus
  - Mie Prefectural Minami-ise High School Watarai Campus
- Mie Prefectural Toba High School
- Mie Prefectural Shima High School
- Mie Prefectural Mie Fisheries High School
- Mie Prefectural Owase High School
- Mie Prefectural Kimoto High School
- Mie Prefectural Kinan High School

==== Private ====
- Wits Aoyama Gakuen High School
- Aino Gakuen Agricultural High School
- Sakuragaoka High School
- Aoyama High School
- Tsuda Gakuen High School
- Akatsuki High School
- Yokkaichi Maryknoll High School
- Kaisei High School
- Suzuka Secondary School
- Suzuka High School
- Takada High School
- St. Joseph Girls' High School
- Mie High School
- Kogakkan High School
- Ise Gakuen High School

==== Correspondence ====
- Hokusei High School
- Matsusaka High School
- Ichishi Gakuen High School
- Ohashi Gakuen High School
- Tokufu High School
- Eishin High School
- Yoyogi High School

=== Shiga ===
- List of high schools in Shiga Prefecture

=== Kyoto ===
- List of high schools in Kyoto Prefecture

==== National ====
- Kyoto University of Education High School

==== Prefectural ====
- Sagano High School

==== Private ====
- Kyoto Gaidai Nishi High School
- Kyoto Tachibana High School
- Nihongo Center Japanese Language School
- Rakunan High School
- Ritsumeikan High School

=== Osaka ===
- List of high schools in Osaka Prefecture

==== National ====
- Osaka Kyoiku University Hirano High School
- Osaka Kyoiku University Ikeda Senior High School
- Osaka Kyoiku University Tennoji High School

==== Prefectural ====
- Osaka Prefectural Kaifukan High School
- Osaka Prefectural Kitano High School
- Osaka Prefectural Shimizudani High School

==== Private ====
- Osaka Seiko Gakuin High School
- PL Gakuen High School
- Seifu High School

=== Hyōgo ===
- List of high schools in Hyogo Prefecture
- Hōtoku Gakuen High School
- Hyogo Prefectural Harima Minami High School
- Hyogo Prefectural Kobe High School

==== Private ====
- Hakuryo Senior High School
- Koyo Gakuin High School
- Nada High School
- Kobe Ryukoku High School

=== Nara ===
- List of high schools in Nara Prefecture
- Todaiji Gakuen

=== Wakayama ===
- List of high schools in Wakayama Prefecture

=== Tottori ===
- List of high schools in Tottori Prefecture

==== Public ====
- Tottori Prefectural Aoya High School
- Tottori Prefectural Tottori Technical High School
- Tottori Prefectural Tottori Koryo High School
- Tottori Prefectural Tottori Commercial High School
- Tottori Prefectural Tottori Nishi High School
- Tottori Prefectural Tottori Higashi High School
- Tottori Prefectural Tottori Ryokufu High School
- Tottori Prefectural Yonago High School
- Tottori Prefectural Yonago Technical High School
- Tottori Prefectural Yonago Nishi High School
- Tottori Prefectural Yonago Hakuho High School
- Tottori Prefectural Yonago Higashi High School
- Tottori Prefectural Yonago Minami High School
- Tottori Prefectural Kurayoshi Sogo Sangyo High School
- Tottori Prefectural Kurayoshi Nishi High School
- Tottori Prefectural Kurayoshi Agricultural High School
- Tottori Prefectural Kurayoshi Higashi High School
- Tottori Prefectural Sakai High School
- Tottori Prefectural Sakaiminato Technical High School
- Tottori Prefectural Iwami High School
- Tottori Prefectural Chizu Agriculture and Forestry High School
- Tottori Prefectural Yazu High School
- Tottori Prefectural Tottori Chuo Ikuei High School
- Tottori Prefectural Hino High School

==== Private ====
- Seisho Kaichi High School
- Tottori Keiai High School
- Tottori Johoku High School
- Yonago Kita High School
- Yonago Shoin High School
- Yonago Hokuto High School
- Kurayoshi Kita High School
- Yurihama Gakuen High School

=== Shimane ===
- List of high schools in Shimane Prefecture

==== Prefectural ====
- Shimane Prefectural Daito High School
- Shimane Prefectural Gotsu High School
- Shimane Prefectural Hamada High School
- Shimane Prefectural Hirata High School
- Shimane Prefectural Iinan High School
- Shimane Prefectural Izumo High School
- Shimane Prefectural Kawamoto High School
- Shimane Prefectural Masuda High School
- Shimane Prefectural Matsue Higashi High School
- Shimane Prefectural Matsue Kita High School
- Shimane Prefectural Matsue Minami High School
- Shimane Prefectural Mitoya High School
- Shimane Prefectural Nima High School
- Shimane Prefectural Ohchi High School
- Shimane Prefectural Ohda High School
- Shimane Prefectural Oki High School
- Shimane Prefectural Oki Shimamae High School
- Shimane Prefectural Taisha High School
- Shimane Prefectural Tsuwano High School
- Shimane Prefectural Yakami High School
- Shimane Prefectural Yasugi High School
- Shimane Prefectural Yokota High School
- Shimane Prefectural Yoshiga High School
- Shimane Prefectural Hamada Commercial High School
- Shimane Prefectural Izumo Commercial High School
- Shimane Prefectural Matsue Commercial High School
- Shimane Prefectural Izumo Technical High School

=== Okayama ===
- List of high schools in Okayama Prefecture

=== Hiroshima ===
- List of high schools in Hiroshima Prefecture

=== Yamaguchi ===
- List of high schools in Yamaguchi Prefecture

=== Tokushima ===
==== Public ====
- List of high schools in Tokushima Prefecture
- Tokushima Prefectural Joto High School
- Tokushima Prefectural Jonan High School
- Tokushima Prefectural Johoku High School
- Tokushima Prefectural Josei High School
- Tokushima Prefectural Jonouchi Secondary School
- Tokushima Prefectural Tokushima Kita High School
- Tokushima Prefectural Tokushima High School of Science and Technology
- Tokushima Prefectural Tokushima Commercial High School
- Tokushima Prefectural Tokushima Chuo High School
- Tokushima Prefectural Naruto High School
- Tokushima Prefectural Naruto Uzushio High School
- Tokushima Prefectural Komatsushima High School
- Tokushima Prefectural Komatsushima Nishi High School
- Tokushima Prefectural Tomioka Higashi High School
- Tokushima Prefectural Tomioka Higashi High School Hanoura Campus
- Tokushima Prefectural Tomioka Nishi High School
- Tokushima Prefectural Ananhikari High School
- Tokushima Prefectural Yoshinogawa High School
- Tokushima Prefectural Kawashima High School
- Tokushima Prefectural Awa High School
- Tokushima Prefectural Awa Nishi High School
- Tokushima Prefectural Anabuki High School
- Tokushima Prefectural Wakimachi High School
- Tokushima Prefectural Ikeda High School
- Tokushima Prefectural Ikeda High School Tsuji Campus
- Tokushima Prefectural Ikeda High School Miyoshi Campus
- Tokushima Prefectural Myozai High School
- Tokushima Prefectural Josei High School Kamiyama Campus
- Tokushima Prefectural Komatsushima Nishi High School Katsuura Campus
- Tokushima Prefectural Naka High School
- Tokushima Prefectural Kaifu High School
- Tokushima Prefectural Itano High School
- Tokushima Prefectural Tsurugi High School
- Tokushima Municipal High School

==== Private ====
- Seiko Gakuen High School
- Koran High School
- Tokushima Bunri High School

=== Kagawa ===
- List of high schools in Kagawa Prefecture

=== Ehime ===
- List of high schools in Ehime Prefecture
- Ehime Prefectural Matsuyama Central High School
- Ehime Prefectural Matsuyama Higashi High School
- Ehime Prefectural Mishima High School
- Ehime Prefectural Uwajima Fisheries High School

=== Kochi ===
- List of high schools in Kochi Prefecture

=== Fukuoka ===
- List of high schools in Fukuoka Prefecture
- Fukuoka Daiichi High School
- Fukuoka Prefectural Fukuoka High School
- Fukuoka Prefectural Shuyukan High School

=== Kumamoto ===
- List of high schools in Kumamoto Prefecture

=== Saga ===
- List of high schools in Saga Prefecture
- Saga Prefectural Chienkan High School
- Saga Prefectural Saga Higashi High School
- Saga Technical High School
- Saga Prefectural Taku High School

=== Nagasaki ===
- List of high schools in Nagasaki Prefecture

=== Oita ===
- List of high schools in Oita Prefecture

=== Miyazaki ===
- List of high schools in Miyazaki Prefecture

=== Kagoshima ===
- List of high schools in Kagoshima Prefecture

==== Public ====
- Kagoshima Prefectural Tsurumaru High School
- Kagoshima Prefectural Konan High School
- Kagoshima Prefectural Kagoshima Chuo High School
- Kagoshima Prefectural Kinkowan High School
- Kagoshima Prefectural Takeokadai High School
- Kagoshima Prefectural Kaiyo High School
- Kagoshima Prefectural Meiokan High School
- Kagoshima Prefectural Shoyo High School
- Kagoshima Prefectural Kagoshima Higashi High School
- Kagoshima Prefectural Technical High School
- Kagoshima Prefectural Kagoshima Minami High School
- Kagoshima Municipal Kagoshima Gyokuryu High School
- Kagoshima Municipal Kagoshima Commercial High School
- Kagoshima Municipal Kagoshima Girls' High School
- Kagoshima Prefectural Fukiage High School
- Kagoshima Prefectural Ijuin High School
- Kagoshima Prefectural Ichiki Agricultural & Horticultural SHigh School
- Kagoshima Prefectural Kushikino High School
- Kagoshima Prefectural Ibusuki High School
- Kagoshima Prefectural Yamakawa High School
- Ibusuki Municipal Ibusuki Commercial High School
- Kagoshima Prefectural Ei High School
- Kagoshima Prefectural Makurazaki High School
- Kagoshima Prefectural Kagoshima Fisheries High School
- Kagoshima Prefectural Kaseda High School
- Kagoshima Prefectural Kaseda Jojun High School
- Kagoshima Prefectural Kawanabe High School
- Kagoshima Prefectural Satsunan Technical High School
- Kagoshima Prefectural Sendai High School
- Kagoshima Prefectural Sendai Shoko High School
- Kagoshima Prefectural Sensatsu Seishukan High School
- Kagoshima Prefectural Satsuma Chuo High School
- Kagoshima Prefectural Kakusho High School
- Kagoshima Prefectural Noda Girls' High School
- Kagoshima Prefectural Izumi High School
- Kagoshima Prefectural Izumi Technical High School
- Izumi Municipal Izumi Shogyo High School
- Kagoshima Prefectural Okuchi High School
- Kagoshima Prefectural Isa Agricultural and Forestry High School
- Kagoshima Prefectural Kajiki High School
- Kagoshima Prefectural Kajiki Technical High School
- Kagoshima Prefectural Kamou High School
- Kagoshima Prefectural Kokubu High School
- Kagoshima Prefectural Fukuyama High School
- Kagoshima Prefectural Kirishima High School
- Kirishima Municipal Kokubu Chuo High School
- Kagoshima Prefectural So High School
- Kagoshima Prefectural Shibushi High School
- Kagoshima Prefectural Kushira Commercial High School
- Kagoshima Prefectural Nanshun High School
- Kagoshima Prefectural Kanoya High School
- Kagoshima Prefectural Kanoya Agricultural High School
- Kagoshima Prefectural Kanoya Technical High School
- Kanoya Municipal Kanoya Girls' High School
- Kagoshima Prefectural Tarumizu High School
- Kagoshima Prefectural Minamiosumi High School
- Kagoshima Prefectural Tanegashima High School
- Kagoshima Prefectural Tanegashima Chuo High School
- Kagoshima Prefectural Yakushima High School
- Kagoshima Prefectural Oshima High School
- Kagoshima Prefectural Amami High School
- Kagoshima Prefectural Oshima Kita High School
- Kagoshima Prefectural Koniya High School
- Kagoshima Prefectural Kikai High School
- Kagoshima Prefectural Tokunoshima High School
- Kagoshima Prefectural Okinoerabu High School
- Kagoshima Prefectural Yoron High School

==== Private ====
- Shonan SHigh School
- Kagoshima Jitsugyo High School
- Kagoshimab High School
- Kagoshima Immaculate Heart Girls' High School
- La Salle High School
- Kagoshima Joho High School
- Ikeda High School
- Kagoshima Shugakukan High School
- Shigakukan High School
- Kagoshima Josei High School
- Kamimura Gakuen High School
- Kagoshima Ikueikan High School
- Hooh High School
- Izumi Chuo High School
- Reimei High School
- Okuchi Meiko Gakuen High School
- Ryuo High School
- Kagoshima Daiichi High School
- Kanoya Chuo High School
- Shoshikan High School
- Shonan Daini High School
- Yakushima Ozora High School

=== Okinawa ===
- List of high schools in Okinawa Prefecture

==== Prefectural ====
- Okinawa Prefectural Chatan High School
- Okinawa Prefectural Futenma High School
- Okinawa Prefectural Ginowan High School
- Okinawa Prefectural Gushikawa High School
- Okinawa Prefectural Ishikawa High School
- Okinawa Prefectural Itoman High School
- Okinawa Prefectural Kadena High School
- Okinawa Prefectural Okinawa Prefectural Okinawa Prefectural Kaiho High School
- Okinawa Prefectural Kitanakagusuku High School
- Okinawa Prefectural Koza High School
- Okinawa Prefectural Kumejima High School
- Okinawa Prefectural Kyuyo High School
- Okinawa Prefectural Maehara High School
- Okinawa Prefectural Mawashi High School
- Okinawa Prefectural Misato High School
- Okinawa Prefectural Miyako High School
- Okinawa Prefectural Nago High School
- Okinawa Prefectural Naha High School
- Okinawa Prefectural Naha Nishi High School
- Okinawa Prefectural Oroku High School
- Okinawa Prefectural Shonan High School
- Okinawa Prefectural Shuri High School
- Okinawa Prefectural Shuri Higashi High School
- Okinawa Prefectural Tomari High School
- Okinawa Prefectural Tominan High School
- Okinawa Prefectural Tomishiro High School
- Okinawa Prefectural Urasoe High School
- Okinawa Prefectural Yaeyama High School
- Okinawa Prefectural Yomei High School
- Okinawa Prefectural Chūbu Agricultural High School
- Okinawa Prefectural Hokubu Agricultural High School
- Okinawa Prefectural Miyako Agricultural High School
- Okinawa Prefectural Nanbu Agricultural High School
- Okinawa Prefectural Yaeyama Agricultural High School
- Okinawa Prefectural Chūbu Commercial High School
- Okinawa Prefectural Gushikawa Commercial High School
- Okinawa Prefectural Nago Commercial High School
- Okinawa Prefectural Naha Commercial High School
- Okinawa Prefectural Urasoe Commercial High School
- Okinawa Prefectural Yaeyama Commercial High School
- Okinawa Prefectural Okinawa Fisheries High School
- Okinawa Prefectural Naha International High School
- Okinawa Prefectural Chūbu Technical High School
- Okinawa Prefectural Hokubu Technical High School
- Okinawa Prefectural Misato Technical High School
- Okinawa Prefectural Miyako Technical High School
- Okinawa Prefectural Naha Technical High School
- Okinawa Prefectural Okinawa Technical High School
- Okinawa Prefectural Urasoe Technical High School

==== Private ====
- Okinawa Shogaku High School
- Konan High School
- Showa Pharmaceutical University High School
- Okinawa Catholic High School

==== Correspondence ====
- Yashima Gakuen University International High School
- Human Campus High School
- N High School
- Tsukuba Kaisei International High School

== See also ==
- Secondary education in Japan
