= 輔仁 =

輔仁 is an East Asian name composed of two characters which individually mean "assistance" and "benevolence".

|輔仁 may refer to:

== People with the given name ==
- Prince Sukehito (輔仁親王), the third prince of Japan's Emperor Go-Sanjō.
- Jeon Bo In (全輔仁), the founding hero of Goryeo.

== Organization name ==
=== Japan ===
- Hojindo (輔仁堂), a private school in Japan's Edo period.
- Gakushuin Hojinkai (学習院輔仁会), Gakushuin University student activities organization.
- Gakushuin Hojinkai Magazine (学習院輔仁会雑誌), an alumni magazine and journal published by the Gakushuin Hojinkai.
- Alumni Association Hojinkai (北海道札幌西高等学校校友会輔仁会), Hokkaido Sapporo Nishi High School Alumni Association.

=== South Korea ===
- Boin High School (輔仁高等學校), a private high school located in Ogeum-dong, Songpa-gu, Seoul.
- Boin Junior High School (輔仁中學校), a private junior school located in Ogeum-dong, Songpa-gu, Seoul.

=== Singapore ===
- Furen International School (FIS, 輔仁国際学校), a 6-year private international high school (middle and high school) in Singapore.

=== Taiwan ===
- Fu Jen Catholic University (輔仁大學), a Catholic university located in New Taipei City.
- Fu Jen Catholic University Hospital (輔仁大學附設醫院), a Catholic university hospital in New Taipei City.
- Fu Jen Catholic High School (嘉義市私立輔仁高級中學), a Catholic high school in Chiayi City.
- Fu Jen Faculty of Theology of St. Robert Bellarmine (輔仁聖博敏神學院), a Catholic seminary located in New Taipei City.
- Fu Jen School (輔仁學派), a Catholic philosophical school in Taiwan.

=== Hong Kong SAR ===
- Furen Literary Society (輔仁文社), was Hong Kong's first anti-Qing revolutionary organization.
- VJ Media (輔仁媒體), a website established in 2012.

=== China ===
- Wuxi Furen High School (无锡辅仁高等学校), a public high school in Jiangsu Province.
- Chongqing Furen Middle School (重庆辅仁中学), a public high school in Chongqing City.

== Building and road names ==
- Hojin Kaikan (輔仁会館), the building of Gakushuin University and Hokkaido Sapporo Nishi High School, Japan.
- Fu Zung Centre (輔仁中心), a building of Shaw College, Chinese University of Hong Kong, Hong Kong SAR.
- Fu Yan Street (輔仁街), a road in Kwun Tong, Hong Kong SAR.
- Furen Road (輔仁路), a road in Kaohsiung City, Taiwan.
