= Joto =

Joto, Jōto, or Jōtō may refer to:

- Jōtō, Tokyo, a former ward in Tokyo City now part of Koto, Tokyo
- Joto High School, Tokushima, Tokushima, Japan, founded in 1902
- Joto language, a dialect of the Banda languages spoken primarily in the Central African Republic
- Jōtō Station (Gunma), a railway station in Japan
- Jōtō Station (Okayama), a railway station in Japan
- Isaiah Crockett, a DC Comics character also known as Joto
- Joto (杖刀), a Japanese swordstick
- Jōtō-ku, Osaka, one of the 24 wards of Osaka, Japan
- Joto, a Spanish pejorative term for homosexual men

== See also ==
- Johto, the setting of Pokémon Gold and Silver
