= Natsuki Taki =

Japanese announcer for Nippon TV (born 1993)

- 滝 菜月
- Born: 11 June 1993 (age 31); Katō District, Hokkaido, Japan
- Citizenship: Japan
- Education: Waseda University School of Commerce
- Years active: 2016–
- Employer: Nippon TV
- Television: Oha! 4 News Live; Shinsō News
- Website: Natsuki Taki Announce Room

Natsuki Taki (滝 菜月, Taki Natsuki, born 11 June 1993) is a Japanese announcer for Nippon TV.

== Biography, personal life ==
She was born in Otofuke, Katō District, Hokkaido. After graduating from Hokkaido Obihiro Hakuyou High School, and Waseda University School of Commerce, she joined Nippon Television in 2016 at the same time as Ren Umezawa and Machiko Sato.

In her college days she won the Grand Prize in the beauty contest Student Heroes! Presents Fresh Campus Contest 2012. Her announcement school was TV Asahi Ask.

== Current appearance programmes ==
Dates	Title	Notes
2 Oct 2017 –	Hirunandesu	Assistant

== Former appearances ==
Dates	Title	Notes
23 Jul – 17 Sep 2016	Ban Repo	
29, 30 Sep 2016	news every.	Ayako Ito's substitute during summer vacation
13 Dec 2016, 13 Feb 2018, 29 Oct 2019	Dancing Sanma Palace	
Sep 2016 – 18 Feb 2017	Audrey no NFL Club	
22 Feb – 27 Sep 2017	Oha! 4 News Live	Newscaster
Jul 2016 – Sep 2017	Shinsō News	Aired on BS NTV; Friday sub-caster
Apr – Sep 2017	Zoom In!! Saturday	News
5 Mar – Sep 2017	Soccer Earth	
7 Jan 2018, 6 Jan 2019	Shōten	

== TV dramas ==
Date	Title	Episode
23 Jul 2017	Aishiteta tte, Himitsu wa aru.	2
