= Mitsumata =

Mitsumata may refer to:

- Edgeworthia chrysantha, known as Mitsumata, a plant used in making Japanese paper
- Mitsumata Station, a rail station in Maebashi, Japan
- 16731 Mitsumata, a main belt asteroid
