= Osaka Evessa =

Professional basketball team in Osaka, Japan

- League: B.League
- Founded: 2004; 22 years ago
- History: 2004–present
- Arena: Ookini Arena Maishima, Edion Arena Osaka, Osaka Municipal Central Gymnasium; Saneiwork Sumiyoshi Sports Center; Ikeda City Satsukiyama Gymnasium
- Capacity: 7,000
- Location: Osaka City (Osaka Prefecture)
- Team colors: Red, Black and Gold
- President: Mitsunori Uehara
- Team manager: Tatsuya Abe
- Head coach: Mathias Fischer
- Ownership: Human Sports Entertainment
- Championships: 3 bj league (2006, 2007, 2008)
- Retired numbers: 1 (44)
- Website: www.evessa.com
Home	Away	3rd

The Osaka Evessa (大阪エヴェッサ, Ōsaka Evessa) are a Japanese professional basketball team based in Osaka. The team competes in the B.League Premier, the highest division of the B.League, as a member of the Western Conference. The team is operated by the Human Group Sports Entertainment Company. The team plays its home games at Ookini Arena Maishima.

The team is named after Ebisu. In July 2015 it was announced that the team will compete in the first division of the new Japan Professional Basketball League, which will commence from October 2016.

== History ==
The team was formed in 2004 with the expansion of the bj league. They have been the most successful team in the league, having won three league championships in the league's first three seasons.

During the 2007-08 season, the team played their home games in seven separate arenas throughout the Osaka Prefecture and Hyogo Prefecture. This was also the first season that the team's game were broadcast live on television (for two games). The total attendance for their home games was 66,069, and the average attendance 3,003. The team finished in first place during the regular season and won the championship for the third consecutive season.

The 2008-09 season was the first season that the team did not use the Namihaya Dome for any of their home games.

=== COVID-19 ===
Thirteen Evessa players and trainers tested positive for COVID-19 in April 2020. Some other Osaka players may be infected.

== Uniform ==
The team jersey colors are black and red. Under Armour is the current supplier of Evessa's uniforms.

The current uniform sponsors are:

- Human Holdings Corporation (chest)
- Abilit Corporation (back)
- Life Creations Corporation (shorts)

== Coaches ==
- Kensaku Tennichi
- Ryan Blackwell (2010–12)
- Zoran Krečković (2012)
- Takao Furuya (2012)
- Bill Cartwright (2013)
- Shunsuke Todo
- Dai Oketani
- Kensuke Hosaka
- Kensaku Tennichi

== Roster ==
Osaka Evessa roster
Players
Coaches

Pos.	No.	Nat.	Name
F	3	(Japan)	Eliet Donley
PG	5	(Japan)	Takumi Ide
G	11	(Japan)	Reiji Hoshino
SG	14	(Japan)	Takuya Hashimoto
F/C	15	(Japan)	Joji Takeuchi (C)
G	20	(Japan)	Rei Goda
G	22	(Japan)	Fumiya Iio
F/C	24	(United States)	Kyle Hunt
G	25	(United States)	D. J. Newbill (C)
G	31	(Japan)	Makoto Kinoshita
F	33	(Japan)	Ira Brown
PG	35	(Japan)	Tatsuya Suzuki
C	54	(United States)	Sean O'mara

Head coach

(Germany) Mathias Fischer

Assistant coach(es)

Ruben Boykin
Kazuya Sasayama

Legend

- (C) Team captain
- Injured

- Roster
Updated: January 26, 2023

== Notable players ==
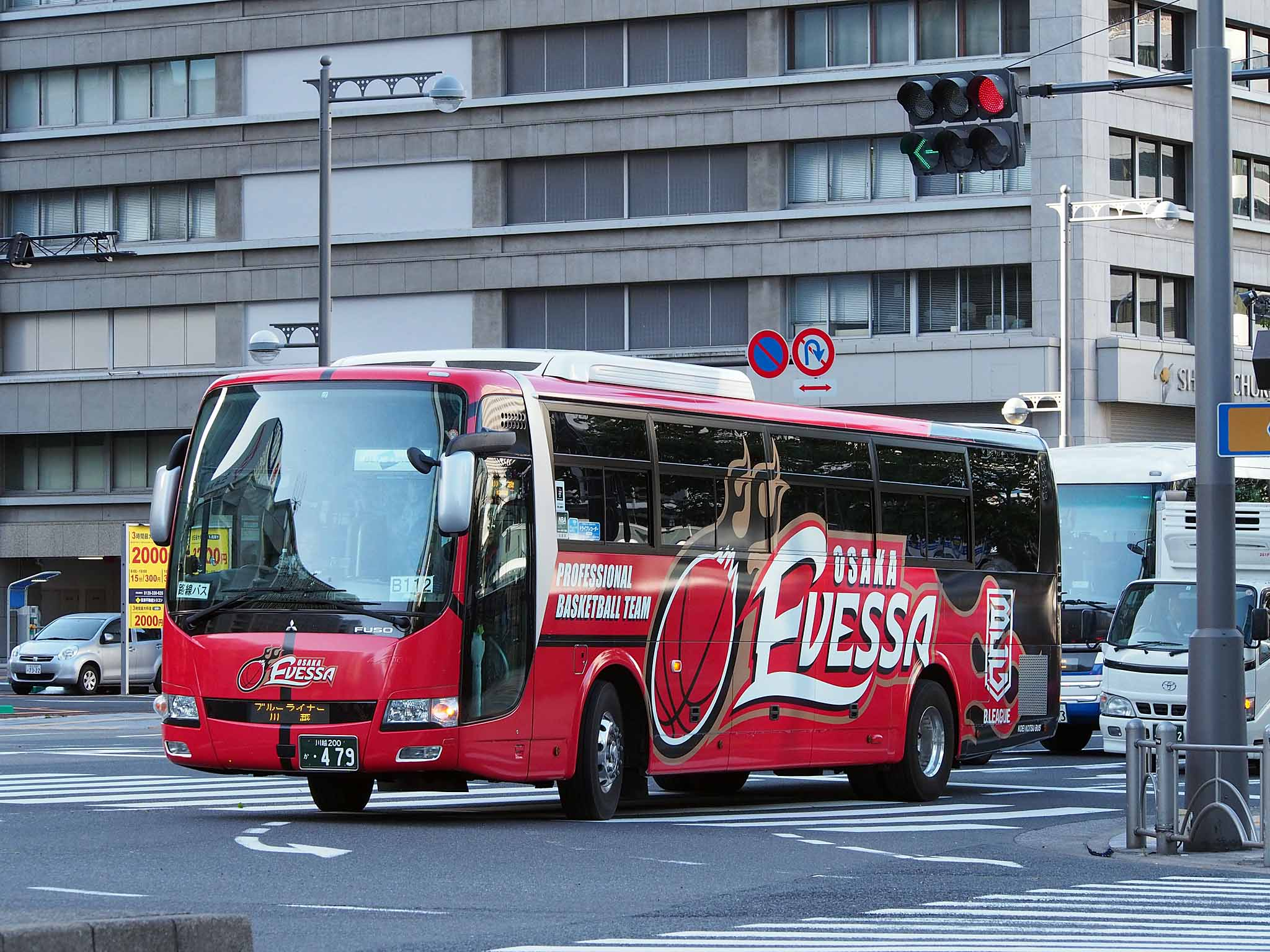
Evessa Bus

- Zach Andrews
- Olu Ashaolu
- Keith Benson
- Marcus Capers
- DeAngelo Casto
- Chen Hsin-an
- Darko Čohadarević
- Josh Dollard
- Nick DeWitz
- Kevin Galloway
- Gary Hamilton
- Josh Harrellson
- Michael Katsuhisa
- Jon Kreft
- Dwayne Lathan
- Matt Lottich
- Trent Plaisted
- Gyno Pomare
- Rick Rickert
- Richard Roby
- Kenny Satterfield
- Hirotaka Sato
- Mike Singletary
- Greg Smith
- Dillion Sneed
- Hirohisa Takada
- Seth Tarver
- Tseng Wen-ting
- Lynn Washington
- David Wear
