= Jōtō Station =

Jōtō Station is the name of two train stations in Japan:

- Jōtō Station (Okayama) (上道駅)
- Jōtō Station (Gunma) (城東駅)
