= Yuna Nagaoka =

Japanese pair skater (born 2005)

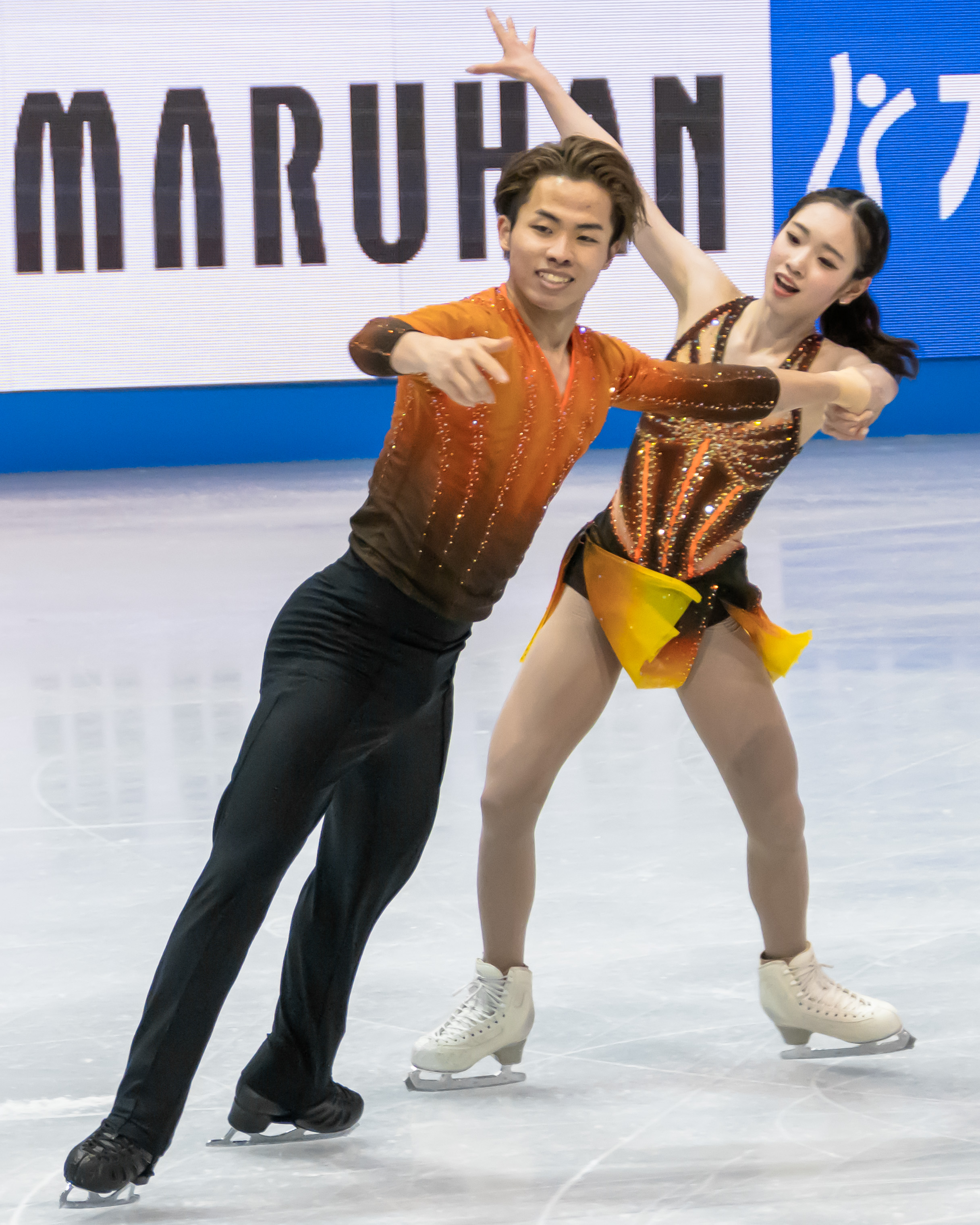
- Nagaoka and Moriguchi at the 2025 World Championships

Personal information
- Native name: 長岡 柚奈
- Born: July 13, 2005 (age 21) Sapporo, Hokkaido, Japan
- Home town: Kyoto, Japan
- Height: 1.56 m (5 ft 1 in)

Figure skating career
- Country: Japan
- Discipline: Pair skating (since 2023); Women's singles (2016–23)
- Partner: Sumitada Moriguchi (since 2023)
- Coach: Dmitri Savin; Fedor Klimov; Sofia Evdokimova; Mie Hamada; Cathy Reed; Satsuki Muramoto; Hiroaki Sato
- Skating club: Kinoshita Academy
- Began skating: 2012
Four Continents Championships
| Bronze medal – third place | 2026 Beijing | Pairs |
Japan Championships
| Gold medal – first place | 2023–24 Nagano | Pairs |
| Gold medal – first place | 2025–26 Tokyo | Pairs |
| Silver medal – second place | 2024–25 Osaka | Pairs |

Yuna Nagaoka (長岡 柚奈, Nagaoka Yuna; born July 13, 2005) is a Japanese pair skater. With partner Sumitada Moriguchi, she is the 2026 Four Continents bronze medalist, the 2025 Asian Winter Games bronze medalist, the 2026 Cup of China bronze medalist, the 2025 CS Kinoshita Group Cup bronze medalist, and a two-time Japanese national champion. She represented Japan at the 2026 Winter Olympics.

== Personal life ==
Nagaoka was born on July 13, 2005 in Sapporo, Hokkaido, Japan.

In 2024, she graduated from Fuji Women's Junior and Senior High School.

== Career ==
=== Early career ===
Nagaoka began figure skating in 2012. Originally a singles skater, she trained at the ROYCE'F･S･C in Sapporo, Hokkaido, coached by Mami Yamada, the childhood coach of Yuzuru Hanyu. Nagaoka got to meet Hanyu when he visited her training rink to personally thank Yamada and have a Q&A session with Yamada's students following his second Olympic gold medal win in 2018.

In 2019, a member of the Japan Skating Federation approached a fourteen-year old Nagaoka, asking if she would be interested in skating in the pairs discipline due to her small stature. Following the encounter, Nagaoka, who did not know much about pair skating at the time, decided to attend the 2019 Japan Eastern Sectional Championships to watch then newly formed team Riku Miura/Ryuichi Kihara compete. The experience made Nagaoka want try competing in the pairs discipline; however, at the time it was difficult to find a Japanese male skater that was interested in teaming up with her. Additionally, the COVID-19 outbreak in early 2020 caused numerous Japanese skating rinks to close down, making pair skating tryout opportunities even more difficult to come by. That same year, remaining in Sapporo, Nagaoka moved her training to Fuji Women's University, where Naomi Takagi became her new coach.

Nagaoka would compete at the 2022–23 Japan Junior Championships in the women's singles event, where she finished twenty-third.

=== Partnership with Moriguchi ===
==== 2023–2024 season: Debut of Nagaoka/Moriguchi, first Japan national title ====
In April 2023, the Japan Skating Federation organized a training camp, which Nagaoka decided to attend. During the camp, she met the pair skating coach of Miura/Kihara, Bruno Marcotte, who immediately noticed her potential as a pair skater. Marcotte ended up introducing Nagaoka to his other student, Sumitada Moriguchi, whose previous pair partnership had recently dissolved. Following a successful tryout, the pair decided to team up with their long-term goal being to compete at the 2026 Winter Olympics. Nagaoka left her hometown of Sapporo and relocated to Uji, Kyoto, the city in which Moriguchi primarily trained. They were officially announced as a pair team in May 2022. It was also announced that Nagaoka/Moriguchi would primarily train at the Kinoshita Academy, where they would work with coaches Mie Hamada, Cathy Reed, Satsuki Muramoto, and Hiroaki Sato, while also making frequent trips to Oakville, Ontario, Canada to work with pair skating coaches Bruno Marcotte and Brian Shales, at the Oakville Skating Club.

Nagaoka/Moriguchi debuted as a pair at the Japan Eastern Sectionals, which they won. Elected as a host pick, Nagaoka/Moriguchi made their Grand Prix debut at the 2023 NHK Trophy. They scored 45.36 for their short program, 90.03 for their free, and 135.39 overall, placing eighth. They went on to win gold at the 2023–24 Japanese National Championships.

They were named to the 2024 World team on the condition that they could obtain their technical minimums at the 2024 Bavarian Open or the 2024 International Challenge Cup. At these events, Nagaoka/Moriguchi finished fourth and sixth respectively. Although the pair scored the scored the minimum technical element score needed for the free skate, they failed to score the minimum technical element score for the short program. As a result, they were unable to compete at the 2024 World Championships.

==== 2024–2025 season: World Championships debut ====
Nagaoka/Moriguchi began their season by competing at the 2024 CS John Nicks International Pairs Competition, where they finished eighth. Going on to compete on the 2024–25 Grand Prix series, Nagaoka/Moriguchi scored personal bests in all competition segments at the 2024 NHK Trophy and finish in seventh place overall. The team would also surpass the minimum technical element score, making them eligible to compete at the World Championships. Initially only assigned one Grand Prix event, Nagaoka/Moriguch were assigned to the 2024 Finlandia Trophy days before the event following the withdrawal of Australian pair team Golubeva/Giotopoulos Moore. At the event, the pair place eighth of the eight pair teams in the short program but would score a personal best free skate by almost eight points, finishing third in that competition segment and moving up to sixth place overall.

In late December, the pair won the silver medal at the 2024–25 Japan Championships behind Miura/Kihara. They were subsequently named to the Four Continents and World teams.

Selected to compete at the 2025 Asian Winter Games in Harbin, China, Nagaoka/Moriguchi won the bronze medal behind Geynish/Chigirev and Ryom/Han.

At the 2025 Four Continents Championships in Seoul, South Korea, Nagaoka/Moriguchi finished in seventh place following a ninth-place short program and a sixth-place free skate. Going on to compete at the 2025 World Championships in Boston, Massachusetts, United States the following month, Nagaoka/Moriguchi placed twenty-second in the short program and did not advance to the free skate segment. Following this disappointing result, Nagaoka considered quitting the sport but decided to continue following the encouragement of Moriguchi.

Feeling the need for a change and hoping to improve their consistency, Nagaoka/Moriguchi decided to make a coaching change from Bruno Marcotte and Brian Shales to Dmitri Savin, Fedor Klimov, and Sofia Evdokimova.

==== 2025–2026 season: Milano Cortina Olympics, Four Continents bronze ====
Nagaoka and Moriguchi kicked off their season by winning the bronze medal at the 2025 CS Kinoshita Group Cup. A couple weeks following that event, they competed at the ISU Skate to Milano, the final qualifying event for the 2026 Winter Olympics. There, they managed to capture the bronze medal thus securing a second Olympic berth for Japanese pair skating.

The following month, Nagaoka and Moriguchi placed fourth at 2025 NHK Trophy, earning new personal bests in the short program, free skate, and total scores in the process. Two weeks later, Nagaoka/Moriguchi finished fourth at 2025 Finlandia Trophy. "We are very glad that the technical score and the PCS were both over 60," Moriguchi said after the free skate. "We know that there is room to improve on the throw jumps and also on the levels."

In December, they competed at the 2025–26 Japan Championships, winning their second national title. Following the event, Nagaoka/Moriguchi were officially selected to Japan's 2026 Winter Olympic team.

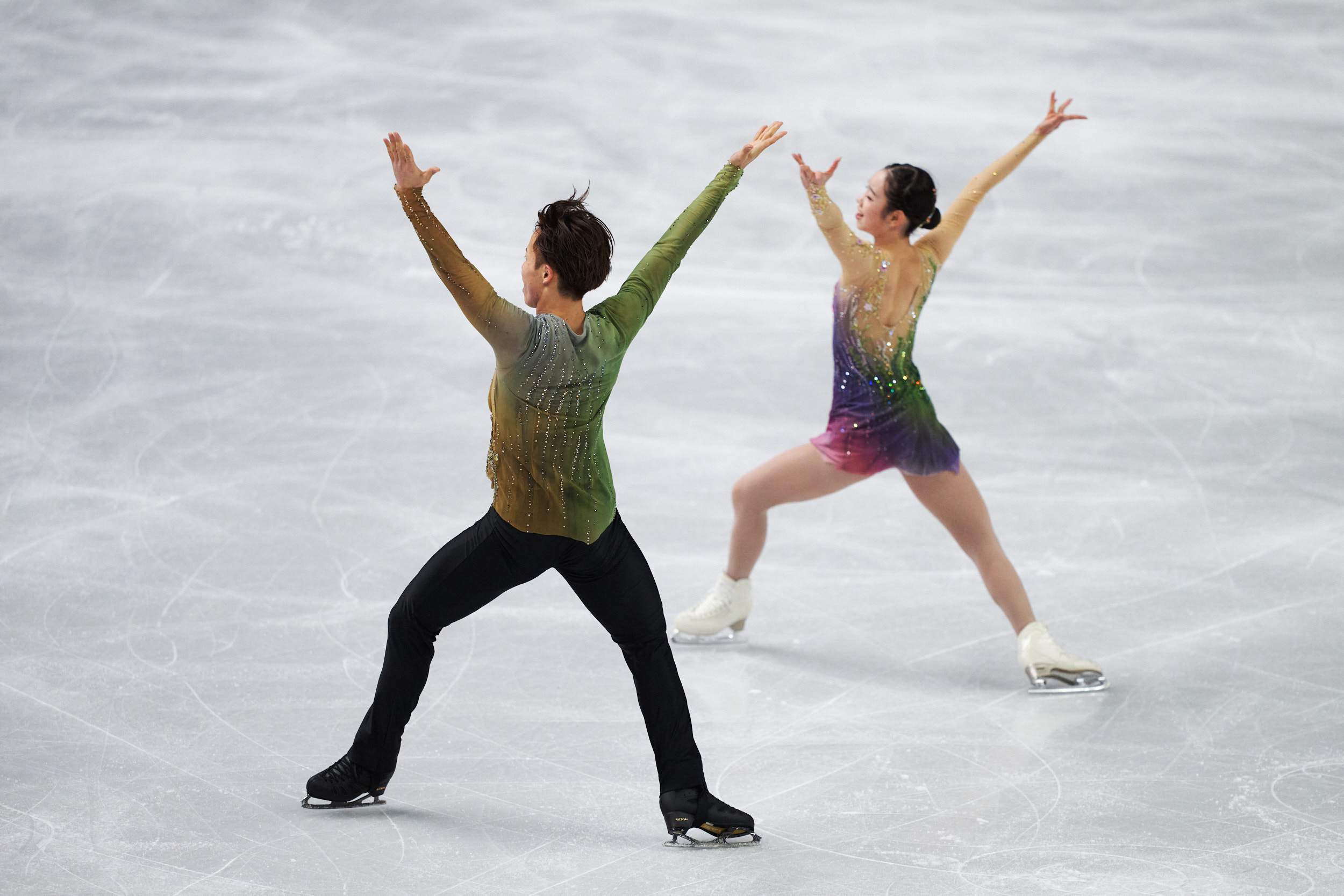
Nagaoka and Morguchi performing side-by-side Ina Bauers at the 2026 World Championships

The following month, Nagaoka and Moriguchi took the bronze medal at the 2026 Four Continents Championships in Beijing, China. "This is our first Four Continents championships medal," noted Moriguchi. "We are generally happy about that. So, this medal will be embedded in our skating career memory."

In February, Nagaoka and Moriguchi competed in the Winter Olympics, their first. They finished 19th of 19 teams after Nagaoka fell on their side-by-side triple loop and throw triple Salchow, which kept them from qualifying for the free skate.

In March, Nagaoka and Moriguchi competed at the 2026 World Figure Skating Championships, where they finished fourth. They were fifth in the short program and third in the free skate. “We’ve been doing our best as a pair to push ourselves to the limit of what we can do,” said Moriguchi. “So, I'm glad we were able to perform in a way that feels like it paid off.”

=== 2026–27 season ===
Nagaoka and Moriguchi opened their season in November at 2026 Cup of China where they finished in third place. “I’m really happy that we were able to win a bronze medal here at the Cup of China,” said Sumitada. “Before this season started, Yuna suffered two serious injuries, so we started preparing for the season very late. We actually only had about one and a half to two months to prepare.”

== Programs ==
=== Pair skating with Sumitada Moriguchi ===
| Season | Short program | Free skating | Exhibition |
|---|---|---|---|
| 2025–2026 | Goodbye Yellow Brick Road (from Ant-Man and the Wasp: Quantumania) by Elton John & Bernie Taupin remixed by Epic Geek & Alala choreo. by Cathy Reed | Tree of Life Suite; V. Figlia del Cielo; I. Sonanze; II. Fiamme; VI. Wild Side by Roberto Cacciapaglia choreo. by Cathy Reed | Pump It Up! by Danzel performed by Endor; Gonna Make You Sweat (Everybody Dance Now) by C+C Music Factory |
| 2024–2025 | Goodbye Yellow Brick Road (from Ant-Man and the Wasp: Quantumania) by Elton John & Bernie Taupin remixed by Epic Geek & Alala choreo. by Cathy Reed | Space Table Symphony by Bernd Breiter & David Garrett choreo. by Cathy Reed | Pump It Up! by Danzel performed by Endor; Gonna Make You Sweat (Everybody Dance Now) by C+C Music Factory |
| 2023–2024 | Can't Take My Eyes Off You by Bob Crewe & Bob Gaudio performed by John Lloyd Young choreo. by Cathy Reed | Space Table Symphony by Bernd Breiter & David Garrett choreo. by Cathy Reed | Pump It Up! by Danzel performed by Endor; Gonna Make You Sweat (Everybody Dance Now) by C+C Music Factory |

=== Women's singles ===
| Season | Short program | Free skating |
|---|---|---|
| 2022–2023 | Madama Butterfly by Giacomo Puccini choreo. by Misao Sato | Winter Symphony by Jennifer Thomas choreo. by Misao Sato |

== Competitive highlights ==
=== Pair skating with Sumitada Moriguchi ===
- GP – Event of the ISU Grand Prix Series
- CS – Event of the ISU Challenger Series
- TBD – Assigned
- WD – Withdrew from competition

Competition placements at senior level
| Season | 2023–24 | 2024–25 | 2025–26 | 2026–27 |
|---|---|---|---|---|
| Winter Olympics | | | 19th | |
| World Championships | | 22nd | 4th | |
| Four Continents Championships | | 7th | 3rd | |
| Japan Championships | 1st | 2nd | 1st | |
| GP Finland | | 6th | 4th | |
| GP NHK Trophy | 8th | 7th | 4th | |
| GP Cup of China | | | | 3rd |
| CS Kinoshita Group Cup | | | 3rd | |
| CS John Nicks Pairs Challenge | | 8th | | |
| Bavarian Open | 4th | | | |
| Challenge Cup | 6th | | | |
| Asian Winter Games | | 3rd | | |
| Skate to Milano | | | 3rd | |

=== Women's singles ===
National
| Event | 22–23 |
|---|---|
| Japan Junior Championships | 23rd |

== Detailed results ==
ISU personal best scores in the +5/-5 GOE System
| Segment | Type | Score | Event |
|---|---|---|---|
| Total | TSS | 209.13 | 2026 World Championships |
| Short program | TSS | 71.52 | 2025 NHK Trophy |
| Short program | TES | 39.94 | 2025 NHK Trophy |
| Short program | PCS | 31.58 | 2025 NHK Trophy |
| Free skating | TSS | 139.58 | 2026 World Championships |
| Free skating | TES | 63.42 | 2026 World Championships |
| Free skating | PCS | 66.16 | 2026 World Championships |

=== Pair skating with Sumitada Moriguchi ===
Results in the 2023–24 season
| Date | Event | SP | | FS | | Total | |
| Date | Event | P | Score | P | Score | P | Score |
|---|---|---|---|---|---|---|---|
| Nov 24–26, 2023 | (Japan) 2023 NHK Trophy | 8 | 45.36 | 8 | 90.03 | 8 | 135.39 |
| Dec 20–24, 2023 | 2023–24 Japan Championships | 1 | 56.07 | 1 | 117.57 | 1 | 173.64 |
| Jan 30–Feb 4, 2024 | (Germany) 2024 Bavarian Open | 5 | 48.90 | 4 | 100.35 | 4 | 149.25 |
| Feb 22–25, 2024 | (Netherlands) 2024 Challenge Cup | 6 | 51.98 | 4 | 106.46 | 6 | 158.44 |

Results in the 2024–25 season
| Date | Event | SP | | FS | | Total | |
| Date | Event | P | Score | P | Score | P | Score |
|---|---|---|---|---|---|---|---|
| Sep 3–4, 2024 | (United States) 2024 CS John Nicks Pairs | 8 | 55.92 | 8 | 102.98 | 8 | 158.90 |
| Nov 8–10, 2024 | (Japan) 2024 NHK Trophy | 5 | 60.32 | 7 | 112.15 | 7 | 172.47 |
| Nov 15–17, 2024 | (Finland) 2024 Finlandia Trophy | 8 | 51.75 | 3 | 120.05 | 6 | 171.80 |
| Dec 19–22, 2024 | 2024–25 Japan Championships | 2 | 61.82 | 2 | 114.86 | 2 | 176.68 |
| Feb 11–13, 2025 | (China) 2025 Asian Winter Games | 2 | 58.49 | 3 | 109.86 | 3 | 168.35 |
| Feb 19–23, 2025 | (South Korea) 2025 Four Continents Championships | 9 | 57.29 | 6 | 117.47 | 7 | 174.76 |
| Mar 25–30, 2025 | (United States) 2025 World Championships | 22 | 51.10 | —N/a | —N/a | 22 | 51.10 |

Results in the 2025–26 season
| Date | Event | SP | | FS | | Total | |
| Date | Event | P | Score | P | Score | P | Score |
|---|---|---|---|---|---|---|---|
| Sep 5–7, 2025 | (Japan) 2025 CS Kinoshita Group Cup | 3 | 66.27 | 3 | 126.50 | 3 | 192.77 |
| Sep 18–21, 2025 | (China) 2025 ISU Skate to Milano | 4 | 62.68 | 3 | 115.98 | 3 | 178.66 |
| Nov 7–9, 2025 | (Japan) 2025 NHK Trophy | 4 | 71.52 | 3 | 130.59 | 4 | 202.11 |
| Nov 21–23, 2025 | (Finland) 2025 Finlandia Trophy | 5 | 67.53 | 4 | 125.59 | 4 | 193.12 |
| Dec 18–21, 2025 | 2025–26 Japan Championships | 2 | 72.91 | 1 | 142.39 | 1 | 215.30 |
| Jan 21–25, 2026 | (China) 2026 Four Continents Championships | 2 | 71.95 | 3 | 125.51 | 3 | 197.46 |
| Feb 15-16, 2026 | (Italy) 2026 Winter Olympics | 19 | 59.62 | - | - | 19 | 59.62 |
| Mar 24–29, 2026 | (Czech Republic) 2026 World Championships | 5 | 69.55 | 3 | 139.58 | 4 | 209.13 |

Results in the 2026–27 season
| Date | Event | SP | | FS | | Total | |
| Date | Event | P | Score | P | Score | P | Score |
|---|---|---|---|---|---|---|---|
| Nov 6–8, 2026 | 2026 Cup of China | 4 | 63.06 | 3 | 118.44 | 3 | 181.50 |

=== Women's singles ===
Results in the 2022–23 season
| Date | Event | SP | | FS | | Total | |
| Date | Event | P | Score | P | Score | P | Score |
|---|---|---|---|---|---|---|---|
| Nov 25 – 27, 2022 | 2022–23 Japan Championships | 22 | 45.20 | 23 | 77.32 | 23 | 122.52 |
