= Hosaka =

Hosaka (written: 保坂) is a Japanese surname. Notable people with the surname include:

- Brian Keith Hosaka, Filipino lawyer
- Choji Hosaka (保坂長治; born 1920), Japanese Olympian and sport shooter
- Edward Yataro Hosaka (1907–1961), American botanist
- Hideki Hosaka (保坂 秀樹; 1971–2021), Japanese professional wrestler
- Kazunari Hosaka (保坂 一成; born 1983), Japanese footballer
- Kazushi Hosaka (保坂 和志; born 1956), Japanese writer
- Kensuke Hosaka (穂坂 健祐), Japanese basketball coach
- Malia Hosaka (born 1969), American professional wrestler
- Nobuto Hosaka (保坂 展人; born 1955), Japanese politician
- Nobuyuki Hosaka (born 1970), Japanese footballer
- Takeshi Hosaka (保坂 武; born 1945), Japanese politician
- Tsukasa Hosaka (保坂 司; 1937–2018), Japanese footballer and manager
