= Katakai Station =

Railway station in Maebashi, Gunma Prefecture, Japan

Katakai Station 片貝駅
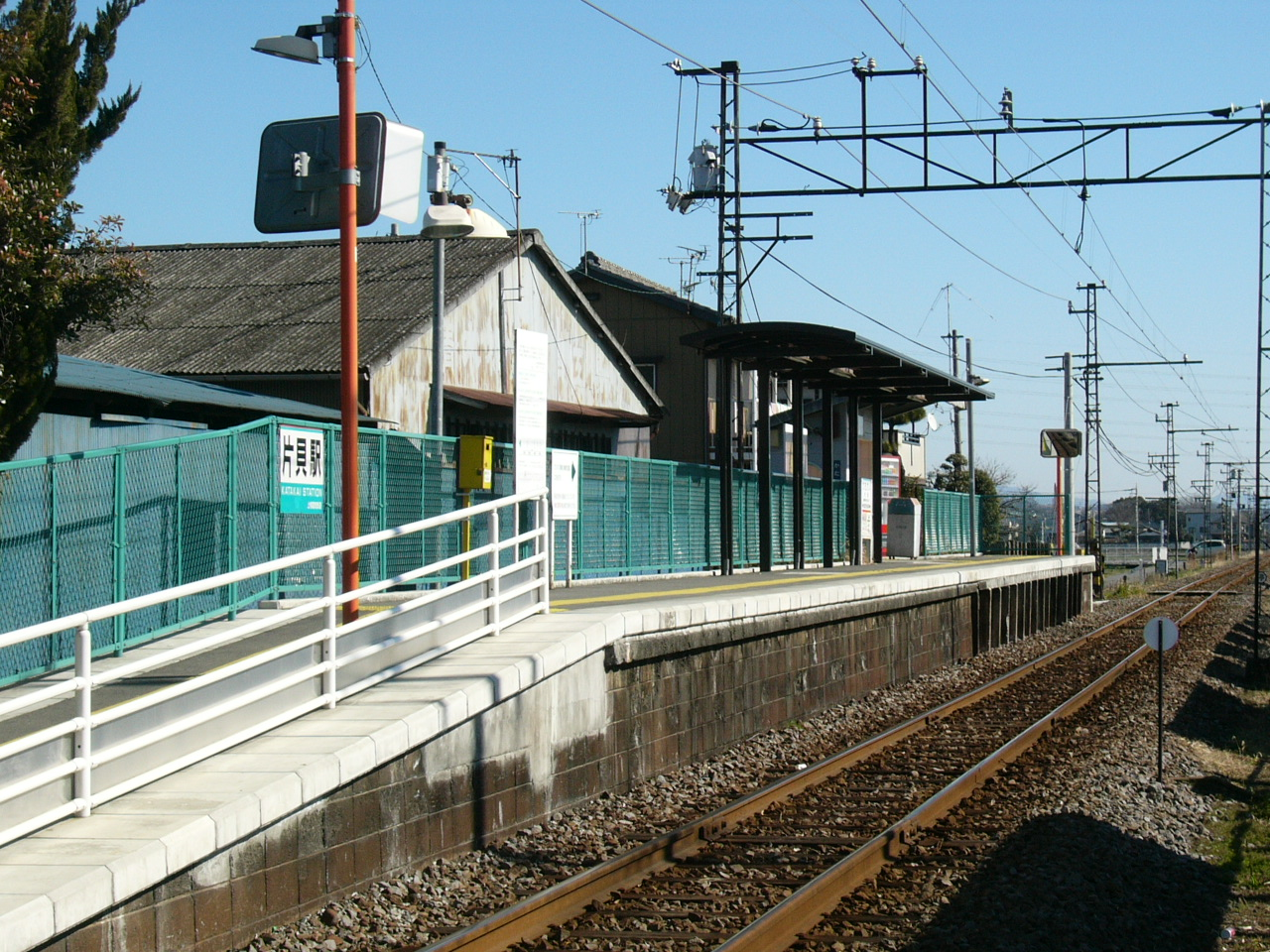
- Katakai Station in February 2004

General information
- Location: Nishikatakai-machi 1-280-5, Maebashi-shi, Gunma-ken 371-0013; Japan
- Coordinates: 36.3942°N 139.0957°E
- Operator: Jōmō Electric Railway Company
- Line: ■ Jōmō Line
- Distance: 2.2 km from Chūō-Maebashi
- Platforms: 1 side platform

History
- Opened: November 10, 1928

Passengers
- FY2015: 335

Services
Preceding station	Jōmō Electric Railway	Following station
Mitsumata towards Chūō-Maebashi	Jōmō Line	Kamiizumi towards Nishi-Kiryū
Location
- Location within Gunma Prefecture Location within Japan

Katakai Station (片貝駅, Katakai-eki) is a passenger railway station in the city of Maebashi, Gunma Prefecture, Japan, operated by the private railway operator Jōmō Electric Railway Company.

== Lines ==
Katakai Station is a station on the Jōmō Line, and is located 2.2 kilometers from the terminus of the line at Chūō-Maebashi.

== Station layout ==
The station consists of a single side platform serving traffic in both directions.

== History ==
Katakai Station opened on November 10, 1928.

== Surrounding area ==
- Maebashi High School

== See also ==
- List of railway stations in Japan
