= Kensaku Tennichi =

Japanese basketball player and coach

Hiroshima Egrets
- Position: Head coach
- League: Women's Japan Basketball League

Personal information
- Born: 21 October 1966 (age 60) Sydney, Australia
- Listed height: 189 cm (6 ft 2 in)

Career information
- High school: Kaifukan (Habikino, Osaka)
- College: Nippon Sport Science University
- Playing career: 1989–2001

Career history

Playing
- 1989–2001: Matsushita Electric

Coaching
- 2001–2003: Matsushita Electric (asst)
- 2003–2005: Matsushita Electric
- 2005–2010: Osaka Evessa
- 2010–2016: Ashiya University
- 2016–2018: Nishinomiya Storks
- 2018–2019: Aisin AW Areions Anjo
- 2019–2022: Osaka Evessa
- 2022–2024: Toyoda Gosei Scorpions
- 2024–present: Hiroshima Egrets

Career highlights
- As player: Japanese college Champions; 2x JBL Champions; 2x Emperors Cup Champions; Emperors Cup Best5; As coach: 3x bj League Champions; B2 Champions

Kensaku Tennichi (天日謙作, Ten-nichi Kensaku) is a Japanese professional basketball coach and former player who is the head coach for the Hiroshima Egrets of the Women's Japan Basketball League (WJBL).

== Head coaching record ==
Legend
Regular season	G	Games coached	W	Games won	L	Games lost	W–L %	Win–loss %
Playoffs	PG	Playoff games	PW	Playoff wins	PL	Playoff losses	PW–L %	Playoff win–loss %

Team	Year	G	W	L	W–L%	Finish	PG	PW	PL	PW–L%	Result
Matsushita Kangaroos	2003	28	14	14	.500	4th	2	0	2	.000	4th in JBL
Matsushita Kangaroos	2004	28	14	14	.500	5th	-	-	-	–	5th in JBL
Osaka Evessa	2005-06	40	31	9	.775	1st	2	2	0	1.000	Bj Champions
Osaka Evessa	2006-07	40	29	11	.725	1st	2	2	0	1.000	Bj Champions
Osaka Evessa	2007-08	44	31	13	.705	1st in Western	2	2	0	1.000	Bj Champions
Osaka Evessa	2008-09	52	35	17	.673	2nd in Western	5	2	3	.400	4th place
Osaka Evessa	2009-10	52	34	18	.654	1st	4	3	1	.750	Western Champions
Nishinomiya Storks	2016-17	60	43	17	.717	1st in B2 Central	3	3	0	1.000	B2 Champions
Nishinomiya Storks	2017-18	60	12	48	.200	5th in Western	-	-	-	–	
Osaka Evessa	2019-20	41	26	15	.634	2nd in Western	-	-	-	–	
