= Hiroshima Egrets =

Women's Japan Basketball League team in Hiroshima, Japan

Hiroshima Egrets 広島イーグレッツ
- League: Women's Japan Basketball League (WJBL)
- Founded: 2013
- Location: Hiroshima, Hiroshima
- Team colors: White and Teal
- Head coach: Kensaku Tennichi
- Website: egrets.jp

The Hiroshima Egrets (広島イーグレッツ, Hiroshima Īgurettsu) are a Japanese professional basketball team based in Hiroshima, Japan. The Egrets compete in the "Future" second division of the Women's Japan Basketball League (WJBL). Founded in 2013 in Himeji, Hyōgo, the team's name is a reference to Himeji Castle's nickname, Shirasagi-jō ("White Egret Castle"). The team retained the name after being purchased by the Hiroshima Dragonflies ownership group and relocating to Hiroshima in 2026.

== Notable players ==
- Mina Uenaga
- Moe Shida
- Cyesha Goree

== Coaches ==
- Yoshihiro Iyoda
- Kensaku Tennichi
