= Takao Furuya =

Japanese basketball coach

Osaka Evessa
- Position: Coach/ General Manager
- League: B.League

Career information
- College: Osaka University of Health and Sport Sciences (1999-2005)
- Coaching career: 2012–present

Career history

Coaching
- 2012-2013: Osaka Evessa (General Manager [Dual Role])
- 2013: Osaka Evessa (asst)
- 2013−2014: Osaka Evessa (asst)
- 2015−2016: Osaka Evessa (General Manager)

Takao Furuya (古屋 孝生, Furuya Takao) is the former head coach of the Osaka Evessa in the Japanese Bj League.

== Head coaching record ==
Legend
Regular season	G	Games coached	W	Games won	L	Games lost	W–L %	Win–loss %
Playoffs	PG	Playoff games	PW	Playoff wins	PL	Playoff losses	PW–L %	Playoff win–loss %

Team	Year	G	W	L	W–L%	Finish	PG	PW	PL	PW–L%	Result
Osaka Evessa	2012-2013	20	5	15	.250	Transitioned	-	-	-	–	-
