= Izumi Chuo High School =

Private school in Izumi, Kagoshima, Japan

Location
- Izumi (Nishi-Izumi), Kagoshima; Japan
- Coordinates: 32°04′38″N 130°20′20″E

Information
- Type: Private school
- Established: 1950
- Grades: 10-12 (Japanese High School Grades 1-3)
- Enrollment: Approximately 600
- Colors: Navy, maroon
- Website: izumi.ac.jp

Izumi Chuo High School (Japanese: 出水中央高等学校, Hepburn: Izumi Chūō Kōtōgakkō) is a private, co-educational high school in Nishi Izumi, Izumi, Kagoshima Prefecture, Japan. Izumi Chuo was founded in 1950 and renamed Izumi Chuo High School in 1985. There are students from farther away (including Kumamoto Prefecture); so there are dormitories for both female and male students. Students usually refer to Izumi Chuo High School as "Chuo" or Izumi Chuo" outside of school.

== Departments ==
General Department

- General Studies

- Students focus on general education and sports.

- Liberal Arts Studies

- Students focus on both sports and studies, especially English studies.
- The Liberal Art Studies Department has been hosting exchange students since 1988.
- Most of the exchange students have been from Australia.
- The 2nd-year class has a 12-day class trip to Australia (Brisbane and sometimes Sydney) each year.
- The Liberal Arts Department also has a partnership with Santa Monica College in the U.S.
- In the early 1990s, the Liberal Arts Department hosted faculty members from Santa Monica College.

- Special Advanced Studies

- Students rarely join any other clubs, for they focus most of their time at school (including club time) on studying.

Department of Health and Welfare

- Health and Welfare Studies

- Students study a branch of nursing.

Nursing Department

- Foundation Courses (high school)
- Specialized Courses (post-high school, 2-year program)

== Gallery ==
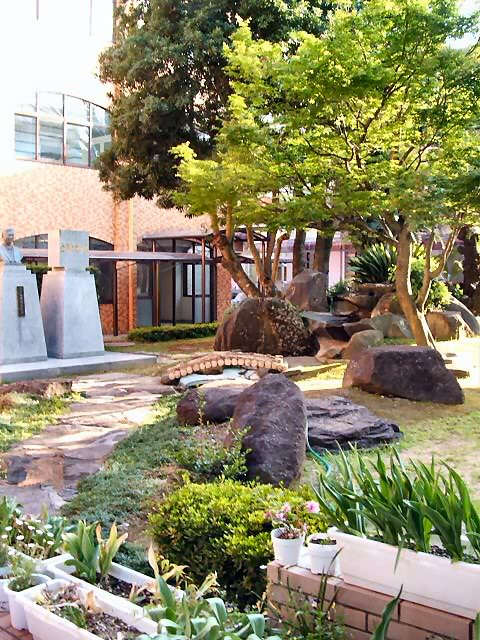
One of Izumi Chuo's Gardens

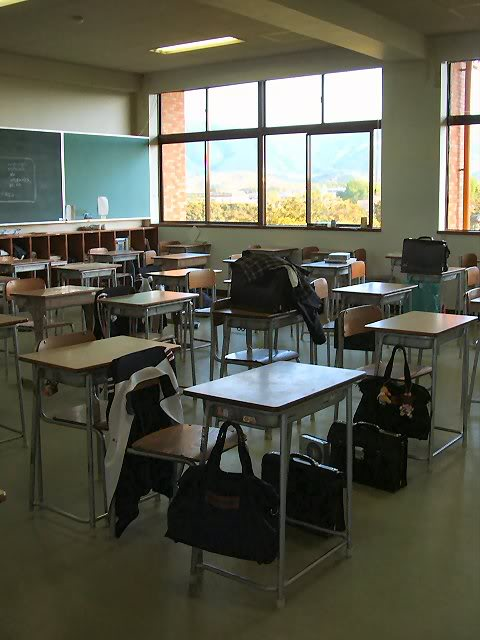
One of Izumi Chuo's Classrooms

== See also ==
- List of high schools in Japan
- Chronology of high schools in Kagoshima (in Japanese)
- List of High Schools that offer nursing training (in Japanese)
