= Osaka Prefectural Kaifukan High School =

High school in Habikino, Japan

- 大阪府立懐風館高等学校

Location
- 766 Oguro; Habikino, Osaka, 583-0847; Japan
- 34°32′22.2″N 135°37′20.2″E

Information
- Type: Public secondary, Co-educational
- Motto: Be ambitious and make a contribution (高志貢献). Study together and make progress together (倶学倶進).
- Established: January 1, 2009
- Grades: 16–18
- Website: Official Web Site
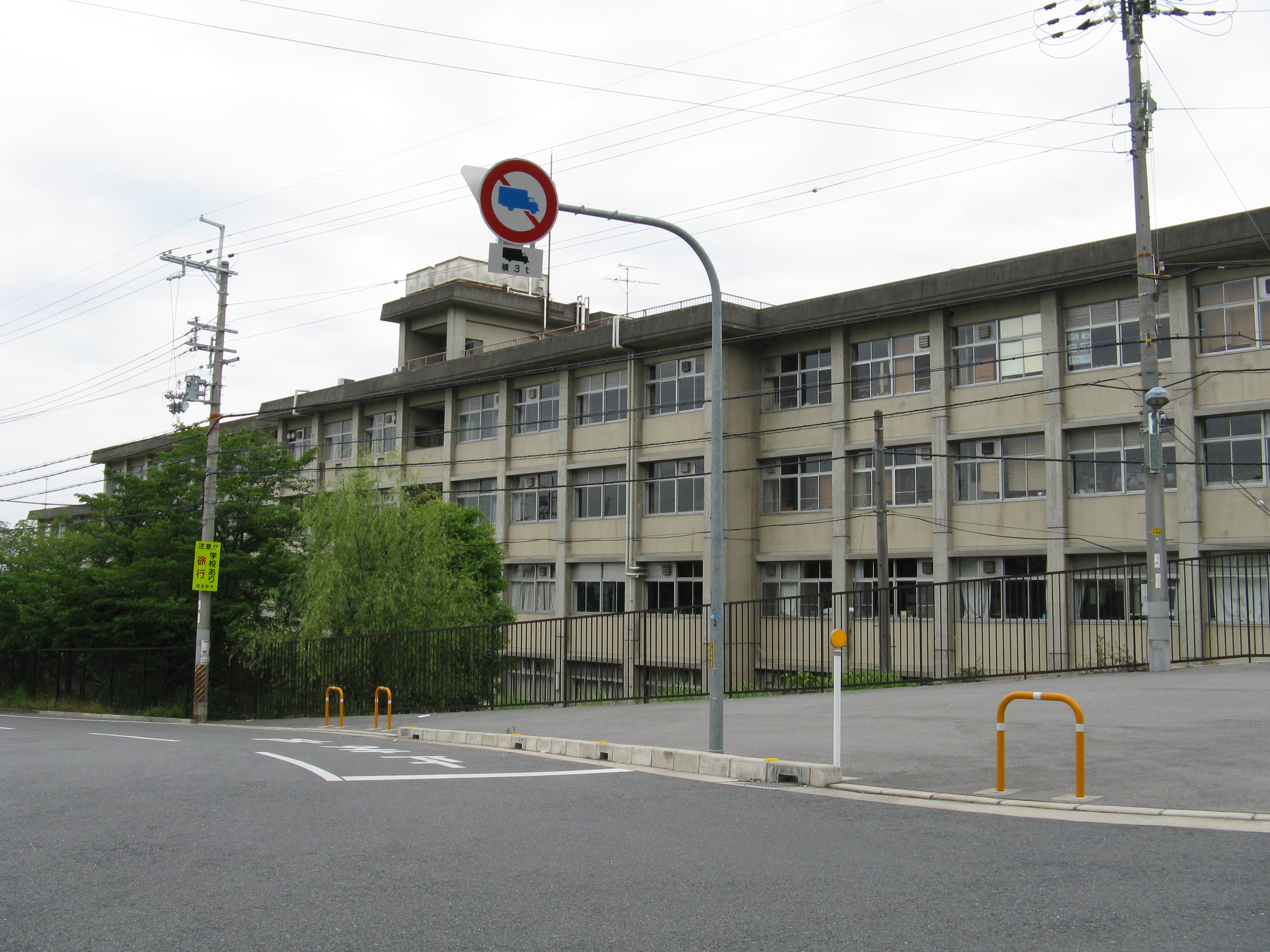
- Former Habikino High School, the predecessor of Kaifukan High School. Photographed in 2008.

Osaka Prefectural Kaifukan High School (Japanese: 大阪府立懐風館高等学校) is a public secondary school located in Habikino, Osaka, Japan.

It was established and opened in 2009 after Osaka Prefectural Habikino High School and Osaka Prefectural Nishiura High School were merged. The school is located in the site of former Habikino High School.

The school name Kaifukan (懐風館) implies respecting the precursors' advice grounded on the history and the ethos of the local area, which is associated with the ancient history and culture of Japan e.g. Furuichi kofungun. The school emblem was designed after the tachibana and two birds flying abreast. The tachibana is a symbol for Habikino City. The birds imply Habikino City itself (Note: The Kanji "羽" of Habikino (羽曳野) stands for a wing of bird in Japanese.) as well as the two predecessor schools.

== History ==
This section will explain not only the history of Kaifukan High School but that of Habikino High School and Nishiura High School, which are its predecessors.

The project office for Habikino High School was founded in 1970. The school was open in 1971 and had a full-time general course. In 1978, Nishiura High school opened in Nishiura of Habikino City, and had a full-time general course as well.

In 2007 the board of education of Osaka Prefecture announced the policy that both Habikino High School and Nishiura High School would be integrated to become a new high school with general selection system. (Note: According to school's homepage, general selection system allows the students to choose various elective subjects corresponding to their interests.) The new school named Kaifukan High School was open in 2009. Both Habikino High School and Nishiura High School stopped accepting applications accordingly, and were closed in March 2011, when the last generation students were to graduate.

=== Timeline ===
- April 1971 – Osaka Prefectural Habikino High School was open.
- April 1978 – Osaka Prefectural Nishiura High School was open.
- April 2009 – Osaka Prefectural Kaifukan High School was open. Both Habikino High School and Nishiura High School stopped accepting applications accordingly.
- March 2011 – Both Habikino High School and Nishiura High School were closed.

== Curriculum ==
As of 2017 the school offers two professional courses including sports youth leaders course and child care leaders course as well as three other courses including humanities course, science course and medical course. The freshmen need to take the common curriculum, and the sophomores are required to choose one of the five courses. Any course is designed to help the students to go up to higher education or to get a job.

== Lawsuit over hair dyeing ==
In 2017 an 18-year-old female student of Kaifukan High School sued the prefecture at Osaka District Court, stating that she suffered mental pain after she had been forced to dye her hair black by the school, seeking compensation for her damages. She claims that she was bullied by the educators under their guidance.

According to the lawsuit, the school forced her to dye her hair black repeatedly on the grounds of the school regulations, even though her mother had told the school beforehand that the student's hair is naturally-brown. She had been forced to dye her hair frequently since her entrance, and as a result her skin and hair was damaged. In addition an educator insulted her merely because she was brought up in a fatherless family. The school forbid her from attending classes as well as school trips and school festivals, blaming her for not dyeing her hair black adequately. In April 2017, the school removed her name from the list of the students arbitrarily and neglected to assign her seating in the classroom. She has not attended a class since September 2016.

The prefecture is asking the court to reject the claim, stating that some of the claims are contrary to the fact. Both the prefecture and the school refused to comment on the case. The head teacher did not declare whether "dyeing one's brown hair black" is a breach of the regulation or not, which prohibits the students from coloring or bleaching their hair. Meanwhile, the student claims that the school told her mother, (Note: Mainichi Shimbun reports that the school told not her mother but the lawyer.) "even an oversea student with natural fair hair would be required to dye his/her hair black in accordance with the rule".

In 2021, in a split ruling, a court in Osaka ordered the school to pay damages for emotional distress. The court ruled that the school rule that students’ hair must be black did not violate regulations.

== Notable alumni ==
Alumni of former Habikino High School are listed.

- Kensaku Tennichi – a basketball coach of Nishinomiya Storks
- Koji Yukawa – a racer of Kyōtei, professional hydroplane racing
- Hirofumi Sawai – Mayor of Matsubara City

== Access ==
- 13 minutes' walk from Komagatani Station on Minami Osaka Line

== See also ==
- List of high schools in Japan
