= Hyogo Prefectural Harima-Minami High School =

Coordinates: 34°42′26″N 134°52′19″E

Hyogo Prefectural Harima-Minami Prefectural Senior High School (兵庫県立播磨南高等学校)
- Harima, Hyogo Prefecture; Japan

Information
- Established: 1984
- Principal: Akiko Tanimoto
- Grades: 1–3
- Website: http://www.hyogo-c.ed.jp/~harimaminami-hs/index.html

Hyogo Prefectural Harima-Minami High School (兵庫県立播磨南高等学校, Hyōgo kenritsu Harima Minami Kōtō Gakkō) is a high school in Harima, Hyogo, Japan. The school opened in 1984 and is the only high school in Harima.

== History ==
The school was founded on 1 April 1984, with a total of 376 students in eight classes.

== School principals ==
- 1984–1988: Koji Kishimoto
- 1988–1990: Tsutomu Umada
- 1990–1992: Tadashi Kitahara
- 1992–1995: Kiyoji Kawahara
- 1995–1997: Makoto Nakayasu
- 1997–1999: Isao Komai
- 1999–2001: Tatsuo Nishiyama
- 2001–2003: Yasuyuki Hashimoto
- 2003–2004: Toru Nirooka
- 2004–2006: Kazuaki Fujii
- 2006–2008: Masafumi Fujimoto
- 2008–present: Akiko Tanimoto
