= Hokkaido Sapporo Asahigaoka High School =

High school in Sapporo, Japan

Coordinates: 43.0377°N 141.3199°E

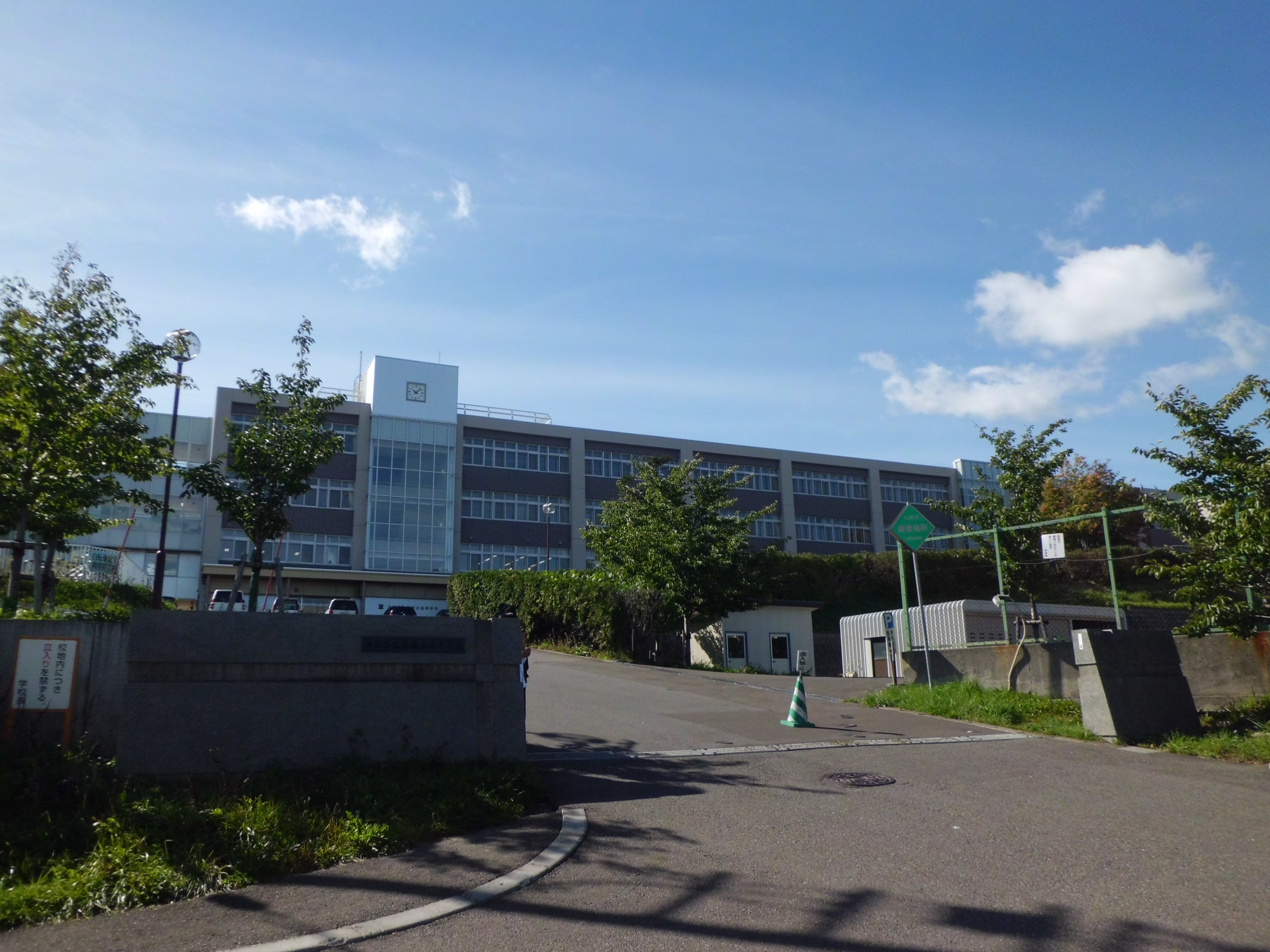
Hokkaido Sapporo Asahigaoka High School

Hokkaido Sapporo Asahigaoka High School (北海道札幌旭丘高等学校, Hokkaidō Sapporo Asahigaoka Kōtō Gakkō) is a high school in Sapporo, Hokkaido, Japan, founded in 1958.

== Notable alumni ==
- Ryoko Yamagishi (山岸 凉子) Japanese manga artist.
- Yumiko Igarashi (いがらし ゆみこ) Japanese manga artist.

== Address ==
- Address: Asahigaoka 6-5-18, Chūō-ku, Hokkaido, Japan
