= Hokkaido Sapporo Higashi High School =

High school in Japan

Coordinates: 43.0598°N 141.3851°E

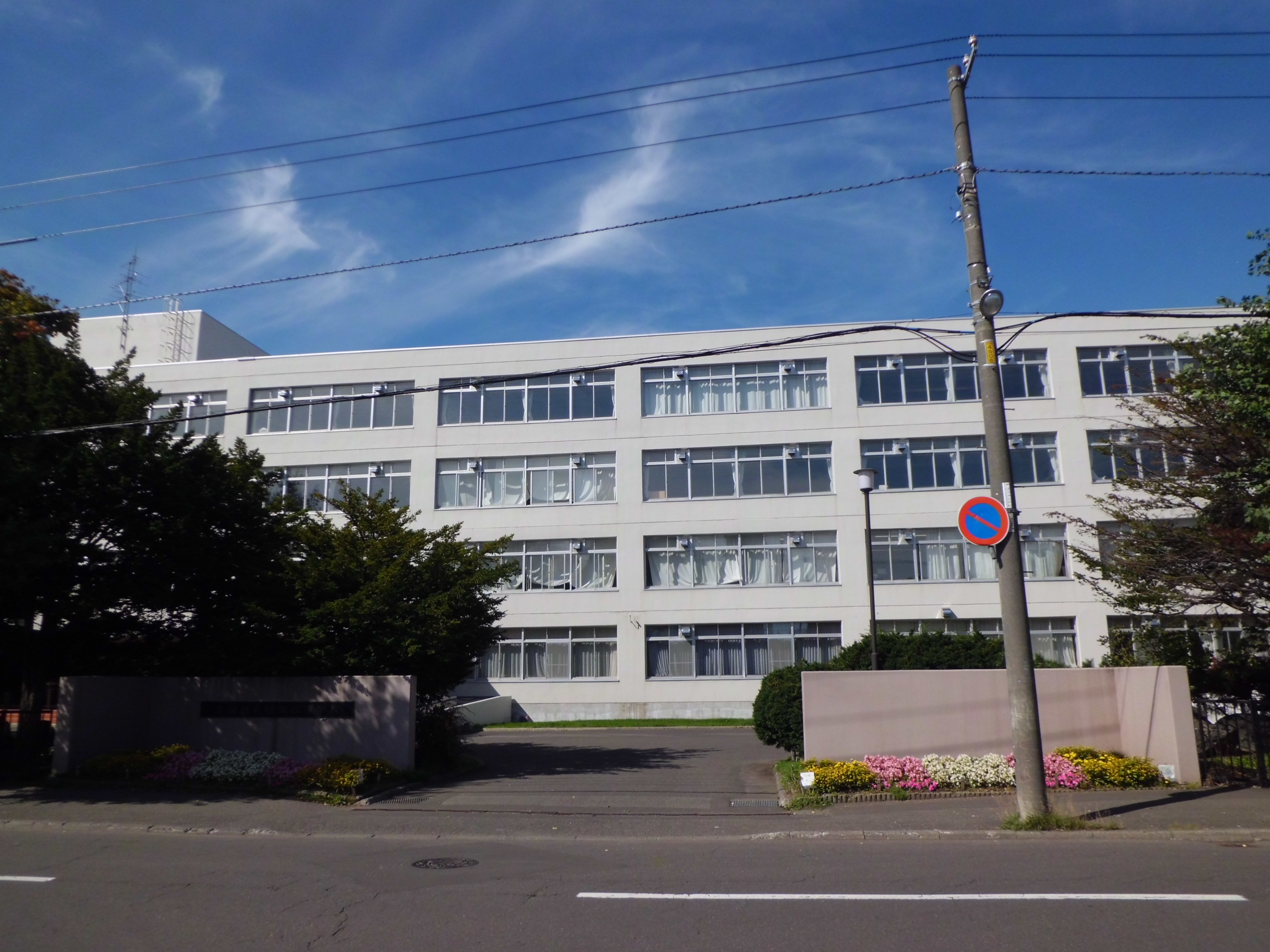
Hokkaido Sapporo Higashi High School

Hokkaido Sapporo Higashi High School (北海道札幌東高等学校, Hokkaidō Sapporo Higashi Kōtō Gakkō) is a high school in Sapporo, Hokkaido, Japan, founded in 1907. Hokkaido Sapporo Higashi High School is one of high schools administered by Hokkaido.

The school is operated by the Hokkaido Prefectural Board of Education.

== Notable alumni ==
- Kazuko Fujita (藤田 和子) Manga Artist; representative works: Momoka Typhoon 『桃花タイフーン!!』 This Japanese manga "Momoka Typhoon" is base of a foreign drama Momo Love.
- Hideo Murota (室田 日出男) Actor; representative works: Battles Without Honor and Humanity: Police Tactics 『仁義なき戦い 頂上作戦』, Karate for Life 『空手バカ一代』 etc.
