= Wuxi Furen High School =

Wuxi Furen High School (Chinese: 无锡辅仁中学)
- Jiangsu Wuxi Yinxiu road (Chinese: 江苏省无锡市隐秀路)

Information
- Type: Private high school
- Motto: "Realizing Ethics, Enhancing Virtue" (Chinese: 明道进德)
- Established: 1918 by Episcopal Church in the United States of America
- School district: Jiangsu, Wuxi
- Principal: Chenxi (Chinese: 陈曦)
- Grades: 6
- Enrollment: 5,000
- Website: http://www.wxfr.net

Wuxi Furen High School was founded in the fall of 1918. The original name of the school was "Wuxi Private Furen Middle School", the preparatory school of Saint John's University in Shanghai. The name Furen (lit. "Helping Charity") is from The Analects of Confucius – Yanyuan :- "meeting friends with articles, helping charity with friends" (Chinese: 以文会友，以友辅仁). The motto is "Realizing Ethics, Enhancing Virtue".

The original location was the east gate of Wuxi old city. Now the school has moved to Yinxiu road, Lihu new district, west of Wuxi.

== History ==
=== Founding ===
On 31 July 1918, the Shanghai Saint John's University Wuxi alumni association member Tang Jiyun and Yang Sijian suggested to set up a private preparatory school for the university. The association was able to collect 4,000 silver taels to set it up. It opened on 14 September 1918. The first principal was an American missionary, Mu Gaowen(Chinese: 慕高文) from Episcopal Church in the United States of America. At first, the school rented JP Liu's house on Shuyuan Lane. After more students entered the school, in 1924, the school built 50 dormitories near Jiangjun bridge, Sujia lane, the east part of Wuxi city. The school was considered the most advanced middle school in the region with modern physics and chemistry laboratories, and amphitheaters.

=== Shanghai campus ===
During Sino-Japanese War, the school was forced to move to Shanghai Concession and rent part houses of Cishu mansion near Shandong road and Nanjing road. After the war is over, school returned to Wuxi.

=== Donglin campus ===
After People's Republic of China was founded, in 1953, school's ownership was altered from private, to public, and the school name changed to "Wuxi No.2 Middle School" (abbr. Wuxi 2nd School). Some elite teachers were dismissed from the school and were ordered to found the Wuxi No.1 High School near the Grand Canal of Wuxi. In January 1971, the second Middle School combined "Donglin primary school" and changed the school's name to "Donglin School". In 1982, they separated again, and the middle school was confirmed as one of the key provincial middle schools.

=== Qinyuan campus ===
On 11 March 1992, to expand from original 12 acres campus area, the school moved to Qinyuan area in the southern suburb. New school occupied 65 acres. In 1994 it changed from middle school to high school. In 1998 it passed national key-school acceptance check. In February 2003, Wuxi government approved Wuxi No.2 High School, Wuxi No.2 Experimental Campus, and Wuxi Furen Private Middle School form up one "Furen Education Corp." The Wuxi No.2 Middle School changed back to its old name "Wuxi Furen High School". In 2004 school was selected as first batch of 4-Star high school.

=== Lihu campus ===
In 2007 decision was made by education bureau to move the school again, to newly built Lihu new city near the Yinxiu road and Hubin road, the original site of Taide International School. On 16 August 2008 new campus started to build. On 15 July 2009, the senior grades moved to new address in Lihu campus, while the junior grades remain in Qinyuan campus.。

== Campus ==
Nowadays the newest campus has 158 acres with building area more than 80,000 square meters. In total of 66 classes and approx. 5,000 teachers and students.

== Notable people ==
Qian Zhongshu, Qian Zhonghan, Tang Xinyuan, Xu Zhihong, Qin Boyi

== Gallery ==
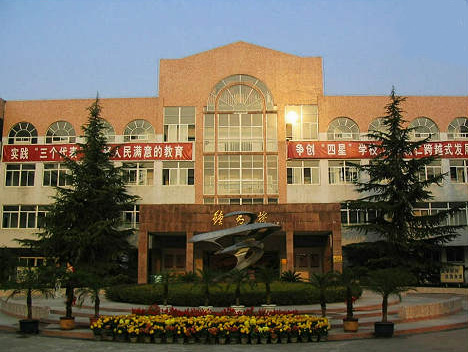
Gate of previous No.2 high school in Qinyuan campus (1992–2008)

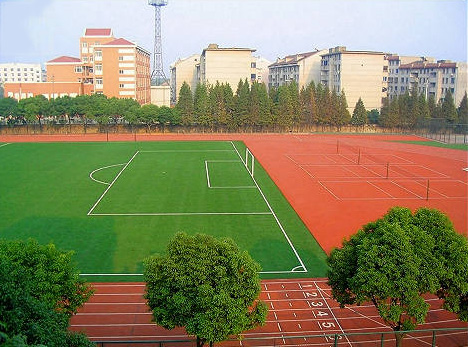
Playground of previous No.2 high school in Qinyuan campus (1992–2008)
