= Kensuke Hosaka =

Japanese basketball coach

Kensuke Hosaka 穂坂健祐
Ryukyu Golden Kings
- Positions: Associate Coach and Head Coach
- League: B.League

Personal information
- Born: April 4, 1985 (age 41) Hyogo Prefecture

Career information
- High school: Higashiyama (Kyoto, Kyoto); Waitaki Boys' (Oamaru, New Zealand)
- College: National Institute of Fitness and Sports in Kanoya
- Coaching career: 2011–present

Career history

Coaching
- 2011–2016: Iwate Big Bulls (asst.)
- 2016–2018: Osaka Evessa (asst.)
- 2018–2019: Osaka Evessa
- 2019–2023: Kawasaki Brave Thunders (asst.)
- 2023–2026: Ryukyu Golden Kings (asst.)
- 2026–present: Ryukyu Golden Kings (associate coach and head coach)

Kensuke Hosaka (穂坂 健祐, Hosaka Kensuke) is the associate coach and head coach of the Ryukyu Golden Kings in the Japanese B.League.

== Head coaching record ==
Legend
Regular season	G	Games coached	W	Games won	L	Games lost	W–L %	Win–loss %
Playoffs	PG	Playoff games	PW	Playoff wins	PL	Playoff losses	PW–L %	Playoff win–loss %

Team	Year	G	W	L	W–L%	Finish	PG	PW	PL	PW–L%	Result
Osaka Evessa	2018-19	60	23	37	.383	4th in Western	-	-	-	–	-
