= Mitsumata Station =

Railway station in Maebashi, Gunma Prefecture, Japan

Mitsumata Station 三俣駅
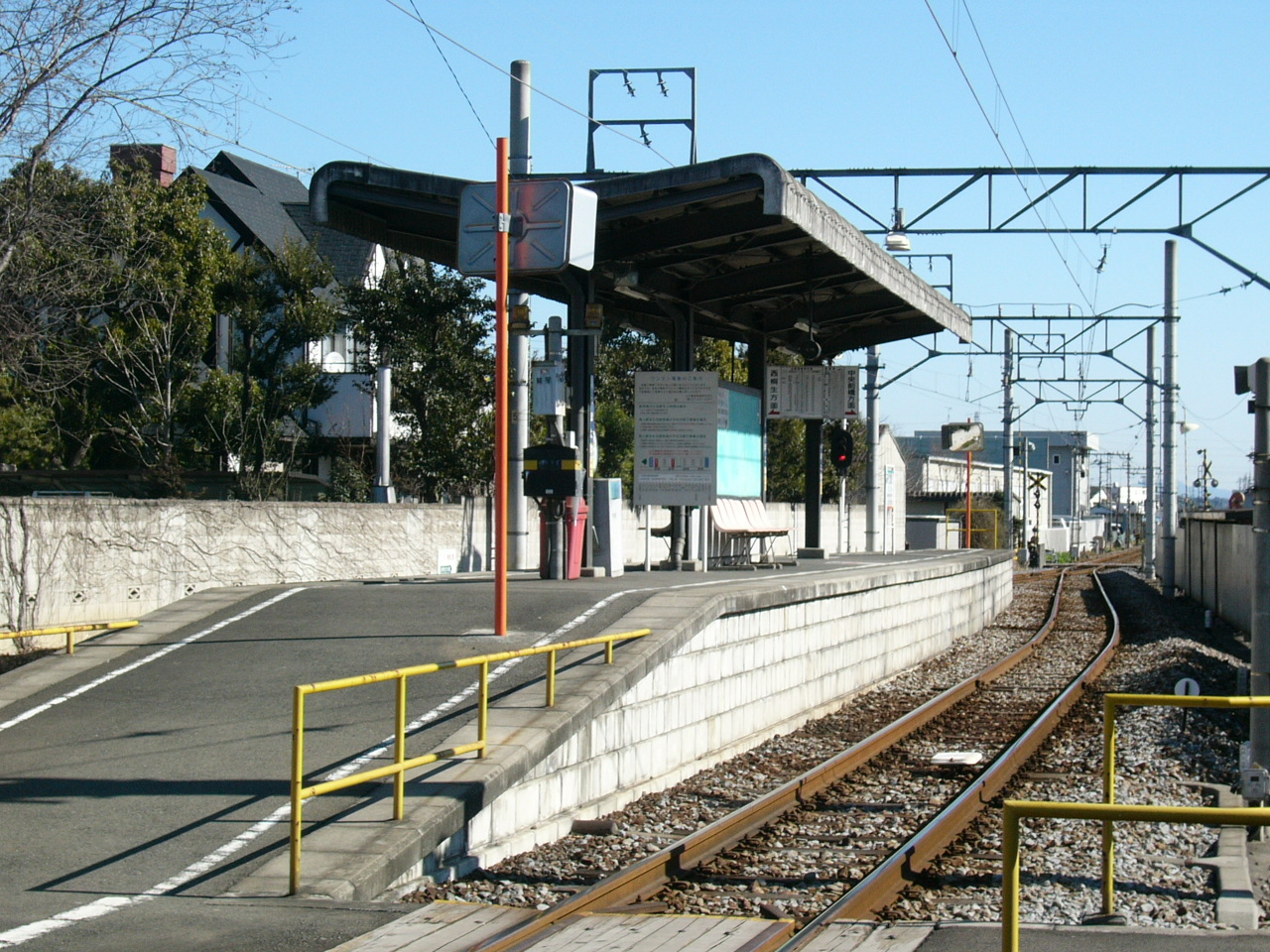
- Mitsumata Station in February 2004

General information
- Location: Mitsumata-machi1-32-5, Maebashi-shi, Gunma-ken 371-0018; Japan
- Coordinates: 36.3935°N 139.0893°E
- Operator: Jōmō Electric Railway Company
- Line: ■ Jōmō Line
- Distance: 1.6 km from Chūō-Maebashi
- Platforms: 1 island platform

History
- Opened: August 25, 1956

Passengers
- FY2015: 189

Services
| Preceding station | Jōmō Electric Railway | Following station |
|---|---|---|
| Jōtō towards Chūō-Maebashi | Jōmō Line | Katakai towards Nishi-Kiryū |
Location
- Location within Gunma Prefecture Location within Japan

Mitsumata Station (三俣駅, Mitsumata-eki) is a passenger railway station in the city of Maebashi, Gunma Prefecture, Japan, operated by the private railway operator Jōmō Electric Railway Company.

== Lines ==
Mitsumata Station is a station on the Jōmō Line, and is located 1.6 kilometers from the terminus of the line at Chūō-Maebashi.

== Station layout ==
The station consists of a single island platform with a level crossing. The station is not attended.

=== Platforms ===
| 1 | ■ Jōmō Line | for Akagi and Nishi-Kiryū |
| 2 | ■ Jōmō Line | for Chūō-Maebashi |

== History ==
Mitsumata Station opened as a signal stop on November 10, 1928. It was relocated 300 meters towards Nishi-Kiryū Station on August 25, 1956 and elevated to a full station.

== Surrounding area ==
- Maebashi Mitsumata Post Office

== See also ==
- List of railway stations in Japan
