= Hokkaido Iwamizawa Higashi High School =

High school in Hokkaido, Japan

Coordinates: 43.1923°N 141.7882°E

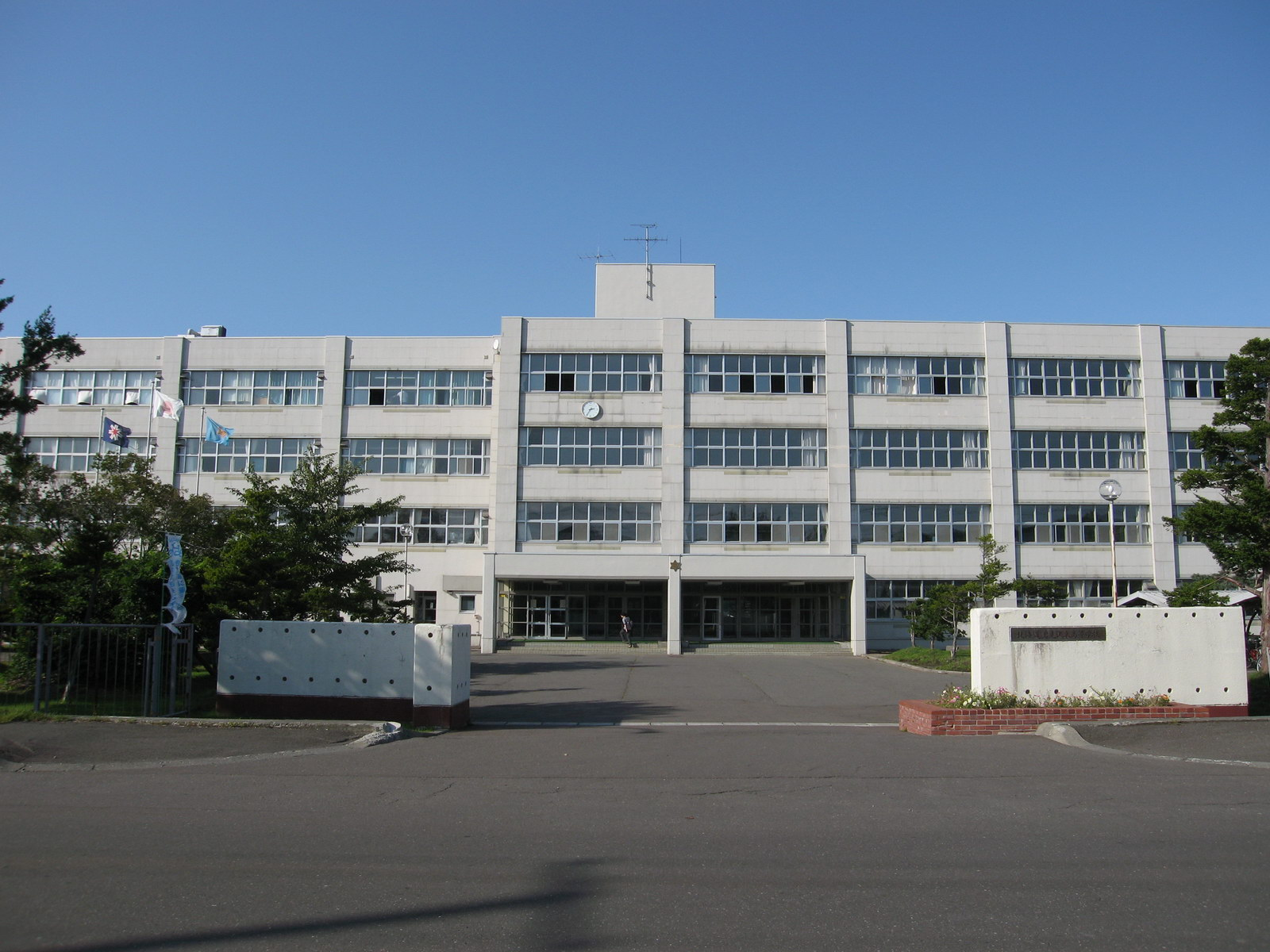
Hokkaido Iwamizawa Higashi High School

Hokkaido Iwamizawa Higashi High School (北海道岩見沢東高等学校, Hokkaidō Iwamizawa Higashi Kōtō Gakkō) is a high school in Iwamizawa, Hokkaido, Japan, founded in 1922. Hokkaido Iwamizawa Higashi High School is one of high schools administrated by Hokkaido.

The school is operated by the Hokkaido Prefectural Board of Education.

== Address ==
- Address: Higashiyama 8-1-1, Iwamizawa, Hokkaido, Japan
