= Hokkaido Sapporo Intercultural and Technological High School =

School in Sapporo, Japan

Coordinates: 43.1202°N 141.2975°E

Hokkaido Sapporo Intercultural and Technological High School (北海道札幌国際情報高等学校, Hokkaidō Sapporo Kokusai Jōhō Kōtō Gakkō) is a high school in Sapporo, Hokkaidō, Japan, founded in 1995. Hokkaido Sapporo Intercultural and Technological High School is one of high schools administered by Hokkaido.

The school is operated by the Hokkaido Prefectural Board of Education.

== Notable alumni ==
- Tatsuki Nara (奈良 竜樹) Japanese footballer who plays in J1 League club Kawasaki Frontale.
- Hidenari Kanayama (金山 英勢) Japanese luger who competed at the 2014 Winter Olympics.
- Ami Kusakari (草刈 愛美) Japanese musician, and the bassist of Sakanaction.

== Address ==
- Address: Shinkawa 717-1, Kita-ku, Sapporo, Hokkaido, Japan
