= Ikeda City Satsukiyama Gymnasium =

Sports arena in Osaka, Japan

Coordinates: 34°49′42″N 135°25′43.3″E

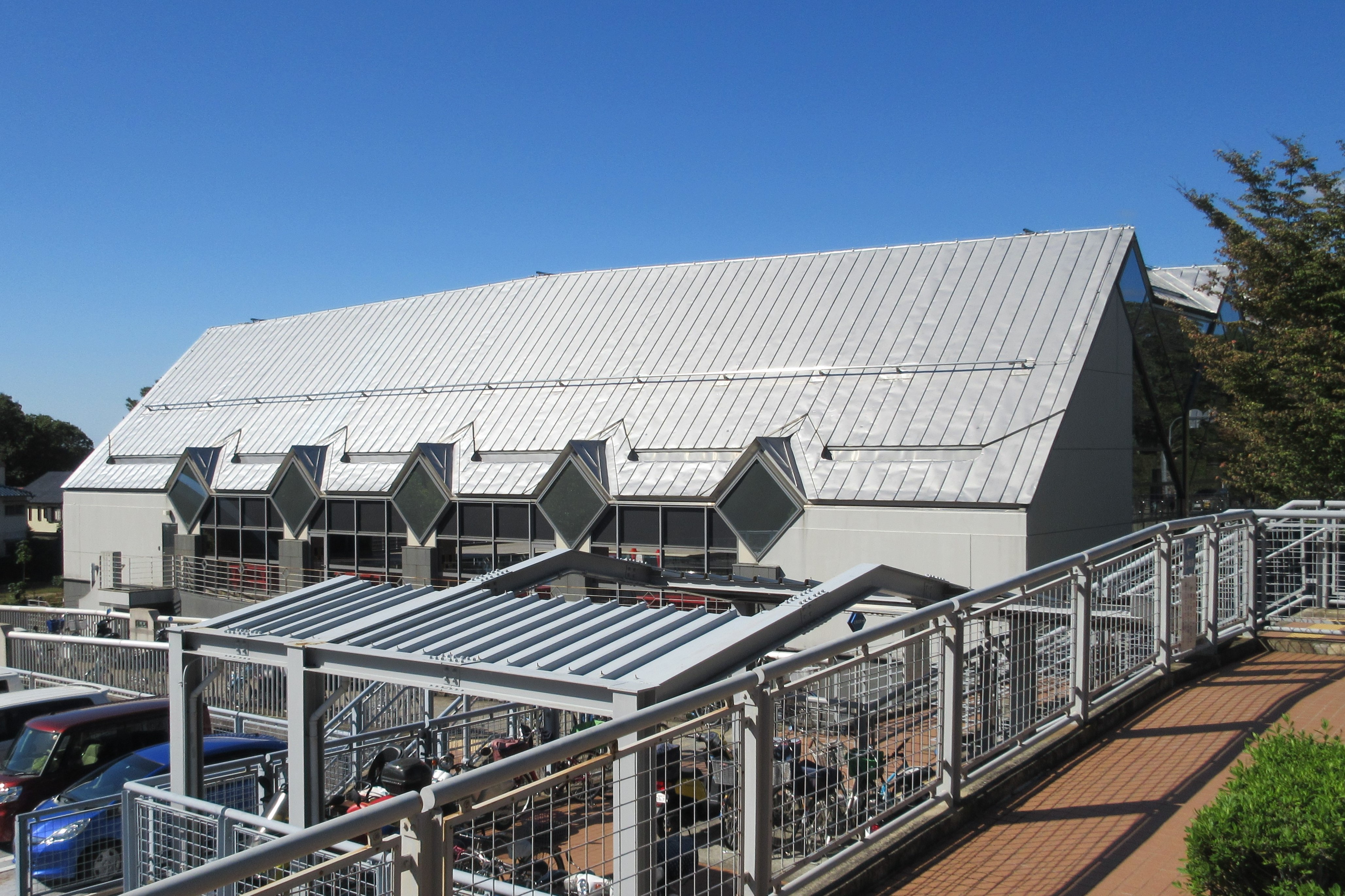
- Interactive map of Ikeda City Satsukiyama Gymnasium
- Full name: Ikeda City Satsukiyama Gymnasium
- Location: Ikeda, Osaka, Japan
- Owner: Ikeda city
- Operator: Ikeda city

Construction
- Opened: October 4, 1996
- Cost

Website
- http://www.satsukiyama-taiikukan.jp/

Ikeda City Satsukiyama Gymnasium is an arena in Ikeda, Osaka, Japan.

== Facilities ==
- Arena 1,680 m^{2}（35×48m）
- Swimming pools 25m x 7 courses
- Training room
