= Kobe Ryukoku Junior and Senior High School =

Private Japanese Buddhist schools in Kobe, Japan

Coordinates: 34°42′44″N 135°12′17″E

Kobe Ryūkoku Junior High School and Kobe Ryūkoku High School (神戸龍谷中学校・高等学校, Kōbe Ryūkoku Chūgakkō・Kōtōgakkō) are private Japanese Buddhist schools located in Kobe, Japan. In 2002 the schools took on their current name and both boys and girls were allowed to matriculate for the first time. The school uniform was also changed to the COMME CA DU MODE (in Japanese) School Label.

== History ==
- 1921 Seitoku Women's Practical School is established in a location other than the current one.
- 1924 Name changed to Kobe Seitoku Women's High School.
- 1926 Moved to the current location in Chuo-ku, Kobe.
- 1948 A new school government is established and the name is changed to Seitoku Gakuen Junior High School & Seitoku Gakuen High School, respectively.
- 1983 General English Course is established.
- 1990 General Arts & Sciences Course is established.
- 2002 Both boys and girls are allowed to matriculate. School name is changed to Kobe Ryūkoku. Special Arts & Sciences Course is established.
- 2003 Both boys and girls are allowed to apply for the Special English Course.
- 2006 Special Arts & Sciences S Course is established.

== Subjects ==
- Daily Curriculum
  - General College Preparatory Comprehensive Course (girls only)
  - General Special Arts & Sciences Course
  - General Special Arts & Sciences S Course
  - General Special English Course
