= Hokkaido Asahikawa Kita High School =

- 北海道旭川北高等学校
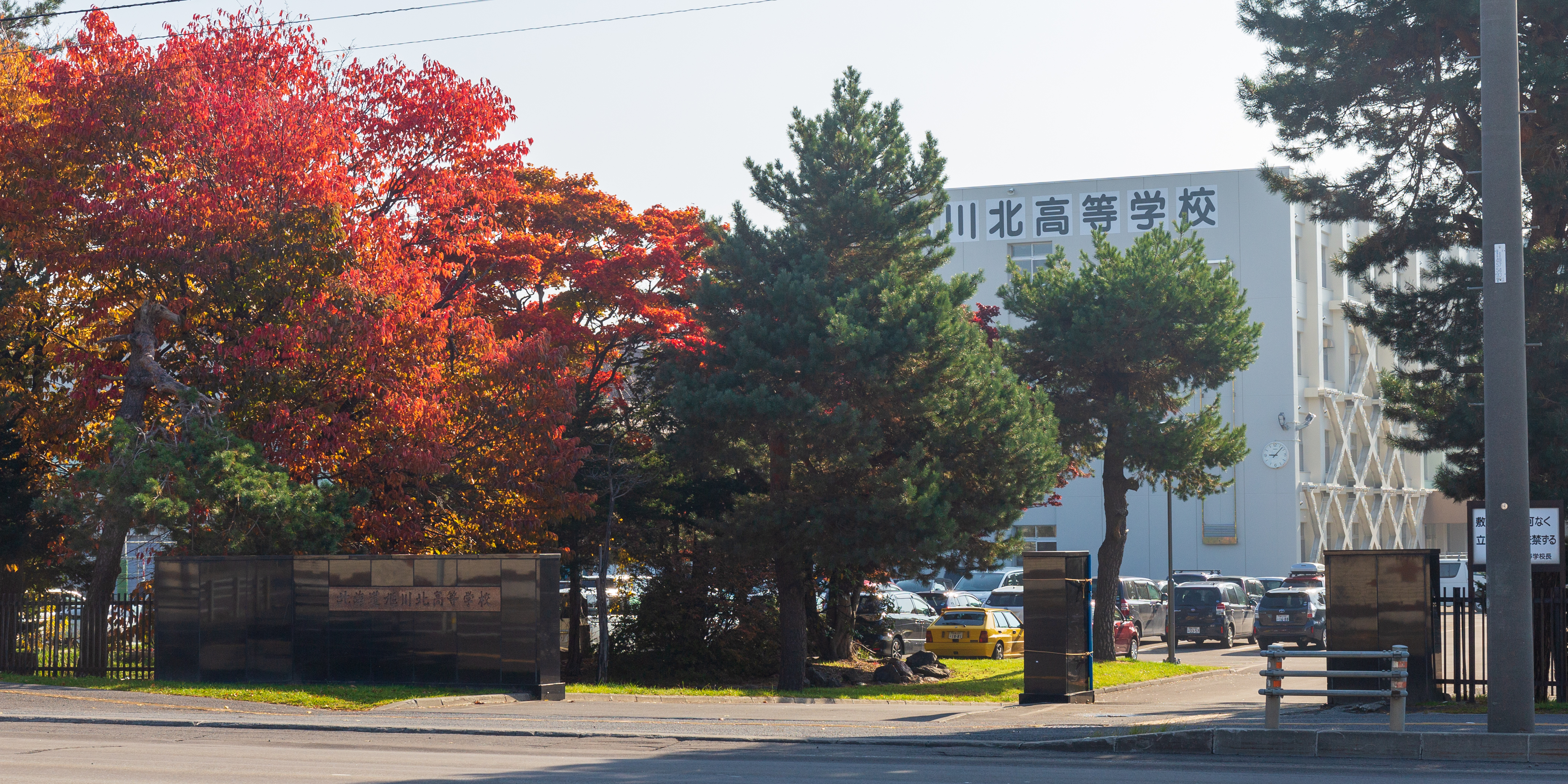

Location
- Asahikawa, Hokkaidō, Japan
- Coordinates: 43.7897°N 142.3701°E

Information
- Founded: 1940
- Website: http://www.asahikawakita.hokkaido-c.ed.jp/

Hokkaido Asahikawa Kita High School (北海道旭川北高等学校, Hokkaidō Asahikawa Kita Kōtō Gakkō) is a high school in Asahikawa, Hokkaidō, Japan, founded in 1940. Hokkaido Asahikawa Kita High School is one of high schools administered by Hokkaido.

The school is operated by the Hokkaido Prefectural Board of Education.

== Notable alumni ==
- Sakurako Terada (寺田 桜子) Japanese curler.
- Satomi Kubokura (久保倉 里美) Japanese olympic athlete of track and field.

== Address and access ==
- Address: Hanasakicho 3, Asahikawa, Hokkaido, Japan
- Access: a 10 minutes' walk from Kitakō-mae (北高前) bus stop in bus-lines of Dohoku Bus or Asahikawa Denkikidou.
