= Hokkaido Obihiro Hakuyou High School =

School in Obihiro, Japan

Coordinates: 42.9321°N 143.2117°E

Hokkaido Obihiro Hakuyou High School (北海道帯広柏葉高等学校, Hokkaidō Obihiro Hakuyō Kōtō Gakkō) is a high school in Obihiro, Hokkaido, Japan, founded in 1923. Hokkaido Kushiro High School is one of the high schools administered by Hokkaido.

The school is operated by the Hokkaido Prefectural Board of Education.

== Notable alumni ==
- Miyuki Nakajima (中島 みゆき) Singer-Songwriter and Radio Personality
- Miwa Yoshida (吉田 美和) Musician, and The Lead Singer for The Band Dreams Come True
- Kazuyoshi Kumakiri (熊切 和嘉) Film Director
- Hiromu Arakawa (荒川 弘) Manga artist and writer, best known for the series Fullmetal Alchemist

== Address ==
- Address: Higashi-5jyo-Minami-1choume-1banchi, Obihiro, Hokkaido, Japan
