= Hokkaido Sapporo Nishi High School =

School in Japan

Coordinates: 43°2′12″N 141°21′11″E

Hokkaido Sapporo Nishi High School Japanese: 北海道札幌西高等学校
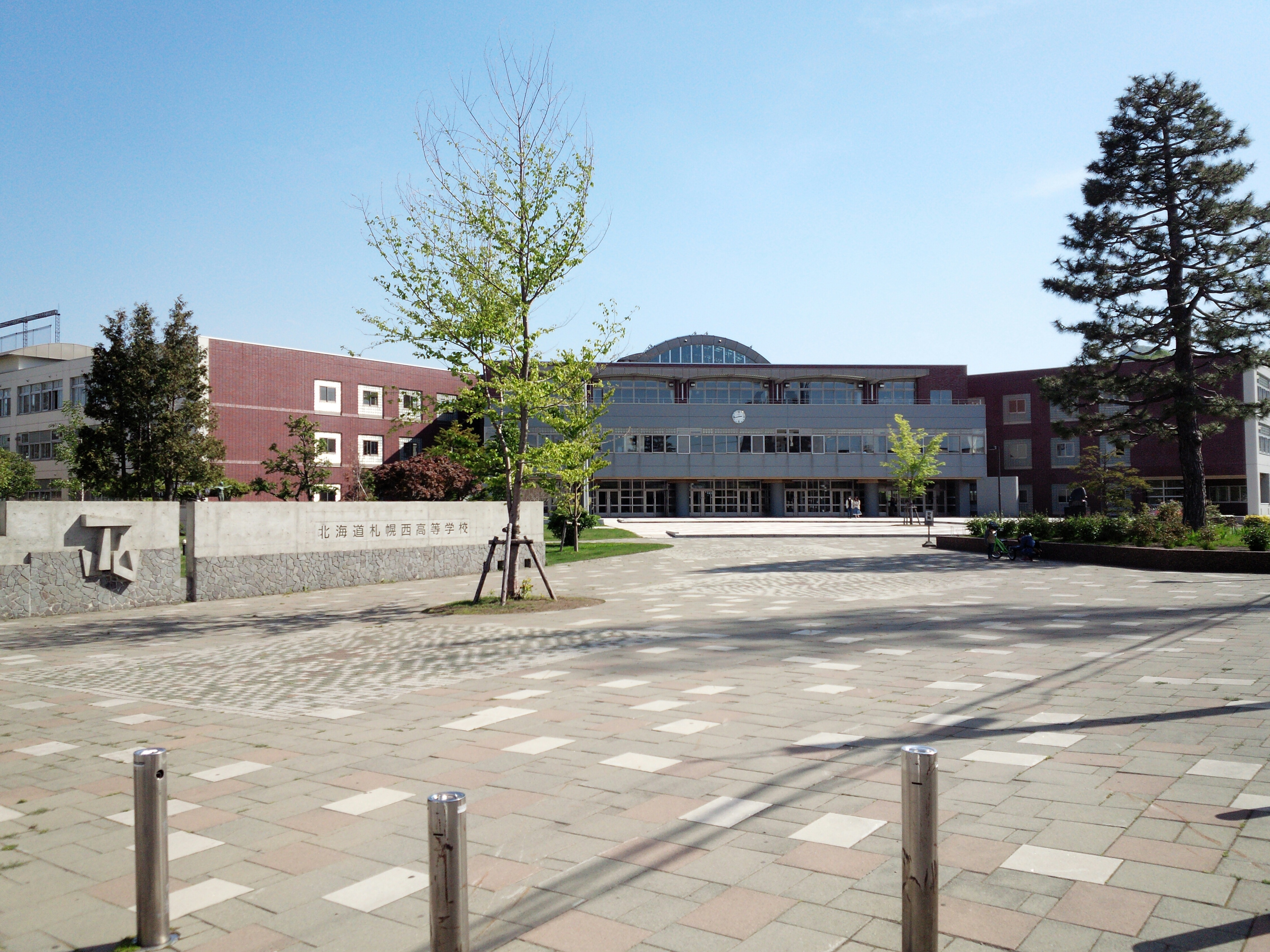

Information
- Established: 1912; 113 years ago
- Website: www.sapporonishi.hokkaido-c.ed.jp

Hokkaido Sapporo Nishi High School (Japanese: 北海道札幌西高等学校, romanized: Hokkaidō Sapporo Nishi Kōtō Gakkō) is a high school in Sapporo, Hokkaido, Japan, founded in 1912. The school is operated by the Hokkaido Prefectural Board of Education.

== Notable alumni ==
- Takashi Kawamura (川村 隆) Businessman; a past chairman of the board of directors at Hitachi
- Akira Ifukube (伊福部 昭) Composer of Classical Music and Film Scores; well known works: the soundtracks of the Godzilla movies by Toho. 映画『ゴジラ』音楽の作曲家
- Shūhō Satō (佐藤 秀峰) Manga Artist; representative works: Umizaru 『海猿』, Say Hello to Black Jack 『ブラックジャックによろしく』
- Yūko Tanaka (田中 裕子) Actress; representative works: Oshin 『おしん』, Tora-san, the Expert 『男はつらいよ 花も嵐も寅次郎』, Mother (TV series)
- Tetsuya Mizuguchi (水口 哲也) Video Game Designer and Co-Founder (along with ex-Sega developers) of the Video Game Development Firm Q Entertainment; representative works: Sega Rally Championship, Lumines, Ninety-Nine Nights, Child of Eden, Meteos, Every Extend Extra, etc.
