= Jōtō Station (Gunma) =

Railway station in Maebashi, Gunma Prefecture, Japan

Jōtō Station 城東駅
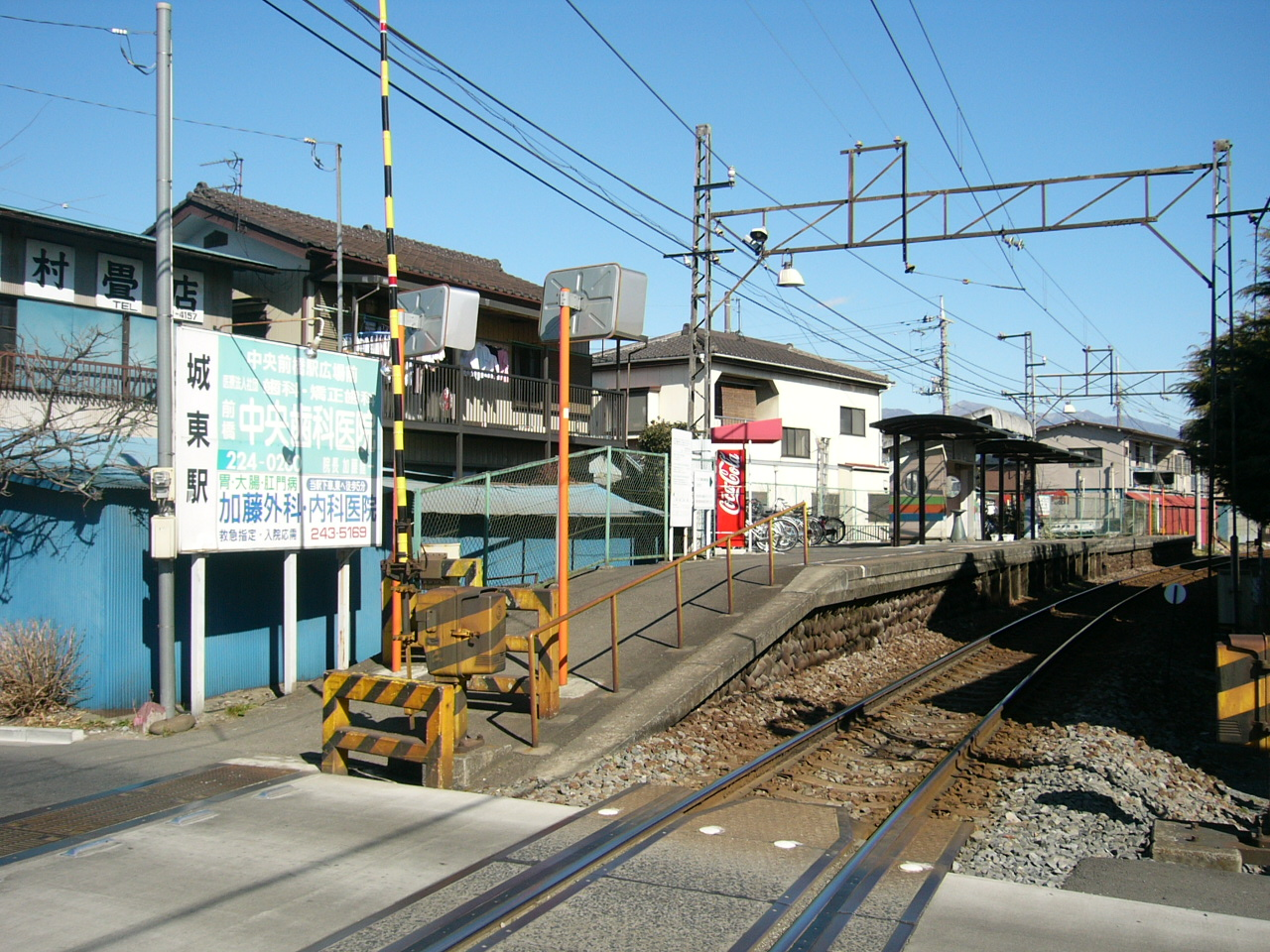
- Jōtō Station in February 2004

General information
- Location: Jōtō-machi 4-23-1, Maebashi-shi, Gunma-ken 371-0016; Japan
- Coordinates: 36.3913°N 139.0813°E
- Operator: Jōmō Electric Railway Company
- Line: ■ Jōmō Line
- Distance: 0.8 km from Chūō-Maebashi
- Platforms: 1 side platform

History
- Opened: November 10, 1928
- Former names: Ikkemachi (until 1994)

Passengers
- FY2015: 138

Services
Preceding station	Jōmō Electric Railway	Following station
Chūō-Maebashi Terminus	Jōmō Line	Mitsumata towards Nishi-Kiryū
Location
- Location within Gunma Prefecture Location within Japan

Jōtō Station (城東駅, Jōtō-eki) is a passenger railway station in the city of Maebashi, Gunma Prefecture, Japan, operated by the private railway operator Jōmō Electric Railway Company.

== Lines ==
Jōtō Station is a station on the Jōmō Line, and is located 0.8 kilometers from the terminus of the line at Chūō-Maebashi.

== Station layout ==
Jōtō Station consists of a single side platform serving traffic in both directions. The station is not attended.

== History ==
Jōtō Station opened as Ikkemachi Station (一毛町駅, Ikkemachi eki) on November 10, 1928. It was renamed to its present name on April 10, 1994.

== Surrounding area ==
- Maebashi Red Cross Hospital

== See also ==
- List of railway stations in Japan
