= Fuji Women's Academy =

Coordinates: 43.0799°N 141.3498°E

- 藤女子中学校・高等学校
- Sapporo, Hokkaido, Japan

Information
- Type: Private
- Established: 1925

Fuji Women's Academy (藤女子中学校・高等学校) is a girls' school in Sapporo, Hokkaido, Japan. It consists of a senior high school and junior high school.

== History ==
The school was established in 1925 in Sapporo.
