= Joto High School =

Coordinates: 34°4′21″N 134°33′32″E

- Tokushima Kenritsu Jōtō Kōtō Gakkō
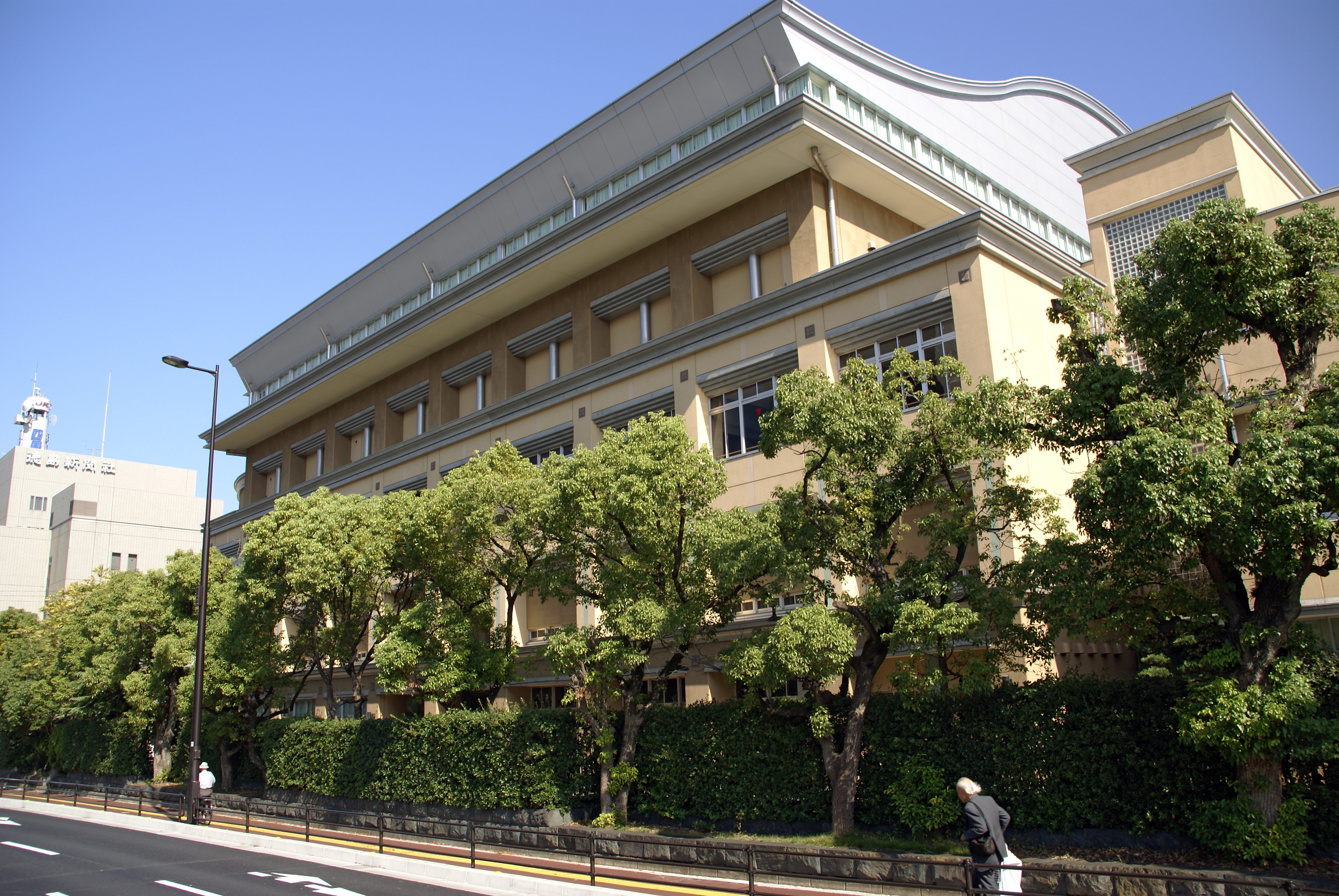
- Tokushima, Tokushima; Japan

Information
- Founded: 1902
- Specialist: Super Global High School
- Gender: Co-educational

Tokushima Prefectural Joto High School (徳島県立城東高等学校, Tokushima Kenritsu Jōtō Kōtō Gakkō) is a secondary school in Tokushima, Tokushima, Japan, founded in 1902. It is one of the top high schools in Tokushima Prefecture. Approximately 1,100 students attend the school.

The school is operated by the Tokushima Prefectural Board of Education. In 2004, the school replaced its old school building with a newer facility.

In 2014, Joto High School was designated as a Super Global High School (スーパーグローバルハイスクール) by the Ministry of Education, Culture, Sports, Science and Technology (MEXT). Joto is one of 56 schools across Japan to participate in the program, which aims to encourage students to become global leaders.

== Notable alumni ==
- Jakucho Setouchi
- Keiko Takemiya

== Surrounding area ==
- Tokushima Shimbun Headquarters
- Shikoku Broadcasting
- Route 11
- Tokushima District Public Prosecutors Office
- Roman Catholic Church
- Tokushimahoncho Intersection
- Tokushima District Court
- Tokushima Central Park
- Tokushima Station
