= FloydFest =

Music and arts festival in Virginia, United States

- The entrance to FloydFest
- Genre: Various: rock, bluegrass, reggae, folk, Yiddish, Cajun, or Zydeco, African, Appalachian, world music
- Locations: Blue Ridge Mountains; Floyd, Virginia
- Years active: 2002–19, 2021–present
- Website: floydfest.com

FloydFest is a music and arts festival held annually near Floyd, Virginia, in the Blue Ridge Mountains.

== History ==
The event began in 2002, and spans four to five days each year with on-site camping and multiple stages featuring rock, bluegrass, reggae, folk, Yiddish, Cajun, or Zydeco, African, Appalachian, and world music performers. The event was cancelled in 2020 due to the COVID-19 pandemic; the 19th edition was deferred to 2021.

After the 2022 festival, organizers moved the festival to a site in the community of Check, Virginia, in Floyd County a dozen miles northeast of the town of Floyd. However, due to environmental concerns about the site, it could not be used for the 2023 festival, which had to be canceled.

In addition to music, the festival features local arts and crafts, morning yoga lessons, story telling, Outdoor Adventure, and a Children's Universe.

Each year, FloydFest features a theme:

- 2002: Floyd County World Music Festival
- 2003: Out Of This World Music
- 2004: Midsummer's Dream
- 2005: Rock of Ages
- 2006: Roots Alive
- 2007: It's in the Mix
- 2008: Family Affair
- 2009: Revival
- 2010: Breaking Ground
- 2011: The eXperience
- 2012: Lovers Rock
- 2013: Rise & Shine
- 2014: Revolutionary
- 2015: Fire on the Mountain
- 2016: Dreamweavin'
- 2017: Freedom
- 2018: Wild
- 2019: Voyage Home
- 2020: -No Event-
- 2021: Odyssey
- 2022: Heartbeat
- 2023: Forever (No Event)
- 2024: Horizon
- 2025: Aurora
- 2026: Daydream
- 2027: Echoes

== Performers ==
Each of the following sections has a list of notable performers for that year.

=== 2002: Floyd County World Music Festival ===
- African Showboyz
- Doc Watson
- John Scofield
- Rhonda Vincent
- Sam Bush
- The Neville Brothers
- Lucky Dube
- Karsh Kale
- Culture
- David Grisman Quintet
- King Chang
- Garmarna
- Stacey Earle
- Peter Rowan & Tony Rice
- DJ Cheb I Sabba
- Acoustic Syndicate
- Rhonda Vincent
- Lonesome River Band
- Solazo

=== 2003: Out Of This World Music ===
- Baka Beyond
- David Grisman Quintet
- Garaj Mahal
- Nickel Creek
- Old & In the Gray w/ Vassar Clements
- Reeltime Travelers
- The Hackensaw Boys
- Donna The Buffalo
- Morgan Heritage
- Yonder Mountain String Band
- John Brown's Body
- Garaj Mahal featuring Fareed Haque
- Kaki King
- Acoustic Syndicate
- Peter Rowan's Texas Trio w/ special guest
- Spookie Daly Pride
- Jim Lauderdale
- Special DGQ 70's Reunion w/ Tony Rice, Mike Marshall and Daryl Anger
- Speech of Arrested development
- DJ Cheb i Sabbah
- Mamadou Diabete
- Granoloa Funk Express
- Nii Tettey Tetteh & Kusan Ensemble
- The African Showboyz plus Man Alive!
- Foundation Stone
- True Sound

=== 2004: Midsummer's Dream ===
- Acoustic Syndicate
- Culture
- Dar Williams
- Del McCoury Band
- Donna the Buffalo
- Railroad Earth
- Sam Bush
- Steep Canyon Rangers
- Tempest
- Culture
- Eek-a-Mouse
- New Monsoon
- Mountain Heart
- Lost and Found
- Larry Keel Experience
- Keith Frank & the Soileau Zydeco Band
- Enter the Haggis
- Cyro Baptista & Beat the Donkey
- TruMystic
- Jim Donovan of Rusted Root
- The African Showboyz
- Hoorah Cloggers
- Foundation Stone
- Darrel Rose
- Mood Cultivation
- Jan Smith
- Kat Mills
- Laura Blackley Band
- Poplar Hollow
- Poverty Creek
- Blue Mule
- None the Wiser
- Wild Turkeys
- Tricia Carter
- Acoustinova
- DJ Williams
- Vulgar Bulgars
- Susan Greenbaum
- Phil Woodail
- Michael Farr
- New Roanoke Jug Band
- Beggers Circus
- Green Lemon
- Steep Canyon Rangers
- Crow Greenspan Band
- Soul Focus
- Slight Departure
- Zen Fisherman
- True Sound

=== 2005: Rock of Ages ===
- African Showboyz
- Ani DiFranco
- Akoya Afrobeat Ensemble
- Asylum Street Spankers
- Blueground Undergrass
- Corey Harris
- Discordian Society
- DJ Williams
- Donna the Buffalo
- Hot Tuna
- J. D. Crowe
- Jackass Flats
- Jan Smith
- Jim Lauderdale
- Kruger Brothers
- Larry Keel
- Michael Farr
- Old School Freight Train
- Railroad Earth
- Scott Miller and the Commonwealth
- Snake Oil Médecine Show
- Soldiers of Jah Army
- Steve Riley & the Mamou Playboys
- The Avett Brothers
- Tortured Soul
- TruMystic
- Xavier Rudd

=== 2006: Roots Alive ===
- Balfa Toujours
- Cyro Baptista & Beat the Donkey
- Eddie From Ohio
- Iris Dement
- Los Lobos
- Rory Block
- The Avett Brothers
- Tim O'Brien
- Akoya Afrobeat
- Rhythm Taxi
- Donna the Buffalo
- Gabby La La
- Drew Emmitt of Leftover Salmon
- Campbell Brothers
- Jake Shimabukuro
- Toubab Krewe
- Garaj Mahal
- Balfa Toujours
- David Bromberg and the Angel Band
- The Lee Boys
- Adrienne Young and Little Sadie
- Lamine Toure
- William Walter and Co.
- Scott Perry
- Devon Sproule
- Kat Mills
- Blue Mule
- Still WIlliss
- Kill Basa Bill's Roadshow
- Charivari
- Dirk Powell
- Appalachian Roots
- Jan Smith Band
- No Speed Limit
- Morwenna Lasso and Jay Pun
- Vulgar Bulgars
- Smooth Kentucky
- Sun Dried Opossum

=== 2007: It's in the Mix ===
- Carolina Chocolate Drops
- DeVotchKa
- North Mississippi Allstars
- Red Stick Ramblers
- Rose's Pawn Shop
- Sons of Bill
- The Duhks
- The Hackensaw Boys
- Andy Palacio & the Garifuna Collective
- Sam Bush
- Donna the Buffalo
- Cat Empire
- Railroad Earth
- Midnite
- Waybacks
- Toubab Krewe
- Blue Highway
- Langhorn Slim
- Kusan Ensemble
- Feufollet
- Lil' Brian and the Zydeco Travelers
- 3 Fox Drive
- Erik Mongrain
- Appalachian Roots
- Scythian
- American Dumpster
- Church
- Infamous Stringdusters
- Carolina Chocolate Drops
- Spiral
- Jan Smith
- Sol Creech Band
- Strut
- The Seed
- Morwenna Lasko & Jay Punn
- William Walter & Co.
- Devon Sproule
- Paul Curreri
- The Wiyos
- Smooth Kentucky
- The Old Ceremony
- Possum Jenkins Band
- Wild Turkeys
- Kat Mills
- Kill Basa Bills Roadshow
- Carbon Culture
- Blue Mule
- Anya & Jackson
- Scott Perry
- Bombadil
- Musicians from the Crooked Road
- Telepath
- The Barrel House Mamas
- Mood Cultivation
- Hope Massive
- Capoeirista

=== 2008: Family Affair ===
- Amos Lee
- Rusted Root
- Avett Brothers
- Railroad Earth
- Tea Leaf Green
- David Grisman Quintet
- Oliver Mtukudzi
- Ivan Neville's Dumpstaphunk
- Donna the Buffalo
- New Monsoon
- Crooked Still
- Chatham County Line
- Golem
- Tony Trischka & Double Banjo Bluegrass Spectacular
- The Rev Peyton's Big Damn Band
- Michael Cleveland & Flamekeeper
- Laura Reed & Deep Pocket
- Jamie McLean
- DJ Williams Projekt
- Yo Mama's Big Fat Booty Band
- The Superpowers
- Bombadil
- Giant Panda Guerrilla Dub Squad
- Gokh-bi System
- Blueground Undergrass
- The Speckers
- Cadillac Sky
- Kill Basa Bill's Roadshow
- Ananda
- 3 minute Lovin'
- Blue Mule
- Mr. Mojo
- Wild Turkeys
- Jan Smith Band
- Spiral
- The Blue Fairy & Prince of Pipes
- Indigenous Gourd Orchestra
- Oneside-Bucktown Kickback
- Lynx
- Sons of Bill
- Junior League
- Katie Pearlman Band
- Buzz Universe
- Segway
- Kristi Emmons
- M02
- Stop Drop & Roll
- Kat Mills
- Eli Cook & Electric Holy Firewater
- Paleface
- Jordan Harmon Band
- Izzy & Chris
- The Aliens
- Curious Strange
- Shane Gamble & the Gentlemen
- the everybodyfields
- iRon Lion
- Thunderdrums
- Blind Corn Liquor Pickers
- Cashmere Jungle Lords
- My Radio
- Jennie Arnau
- Turbo Project
- David Shultz
- Kings of Belmont
- Sci Fi
- Moossa
- HuDost
- Stephanie Rocker
- William Walter & Co.

=== 2009: Revival ===
- Blues Traveler (with special guest "Survivorman" Les Stroud)
- Blues and Lasers
- Donna the Buffalo
- EOTO
- Folk Soul Revival
- Forro in the Dark
- Grace Potter and the Nocturnals
- Stop Drop & Roll
- Grupo Fantasma
- Holy Ghost Tent Revival
- Hot 8 Brass Band
- Lee Boys
- Luminescent Orchestrii
- My Radio
- Nathan Moore
- Ollabelle
- Railroad Earth
- Raw Dawg
- Rooster Blues
- Rose's Pawn Shop
- Sxip Shirey
- The Belleville Outfit
- The Bittersweets
- The Duhks
- The Felice Brothers
- The Horse Flies
- The Old Ceremony
- The Sadies
- Toubab Krewe
- Yard Dogs Road Show

=== 2010: Breaking Ground ===
- The Levon Helm Band
- Old Crow Medicine Show
- Grace Potter & the Nocturnals
- Galactic featuring Corey Henry of The Rebirth Brass Band
- Railroad Earth
- JJ Grey & Mofro
- Karl Denson's Tiny Universe
- Soulive
- Bassekou Kouyate & Ngoni ba
- Konono No1
- Deer Tick
- Tift Merritt
- The Low Anthem
- Hackensaw Boys
- Cornmeal
- Eric Krasno & Chapter 2
- Pimps of Joytime
- Mountain Heart
- Flam Chen
- Budos Band
- Joe Pug
- Bearfoot
- Rockridge Brothers
- WIYOS
- Solas
- Spiral
- Rising Appalachia
- Dangermuffin
- Miss Tess & the Bon Ton Parade
- Christabel & the Jons
- Boulder Acoustic Society
- Holy Ghost Tent Revival
- Packway Handle Band
- Alexis P Suter Band
- Soulhound
- Two Man Gentleman Band
- Butch Robins
- Imagicnation
- The Mantras
- Sol Driven Train
- William Walter & Co
- Thunderdrums
- Papadosio
- Folk Soul Revival
- The Barefoot Movement
- Kat Mills
- 3 Minute Lovin, *Adrienne Young
- The Steel Wheels
- American Dumpster
- Dirty Horse
- Blue Mule
- Scintillation Fire Troupe
- Old Sledge
- Kill Basa Bill's Roadshow
- JP Harris & the Tough Choices
- The Hot Seats
- Dance Afire
- White Top Mountain Band
- My Radio
- Sauerkraut Band
- Danny Knicely
- Farm Use Only
- Hoorah Cloggers
- JuggleThis!
- Rocknoceros
- Miss Kitty's Society for Wayward Cosmonauts
- Charles Eisenstein
- Dharma Rebel w/ Jason Murphy
- James Justin & Co.
- Musicians of the Crooked Road.

=== 2012: Lovers Rock ===
- ALO
- Alison Krauss & Union Station (feat. Jerry Douglas)
- American Aquarium
- Anders Osborne
- Chris Thile
- Brandi Carlile
- Bruce Hornsby & the Noisemakers
- David Wax Museum
- Dawes
- Drew Emmitt Band
- Drive-By Truckers
- Galactic (with special guest Corey Henry)
- Garage A Trois
- Gary Clark Jr.
- Gregory Alan Isakov
- Ha Ha Tonka
- Hoots & Hellmouth
- Jackson Browne
- Jonathan Wilson
- Leftover Salmon
- Locos Por Juana
- MarchFourth Marching Band
- Marco Benevento
- Matisyahu
- Michael Franti & Spearhead
- Orgone
- Ozomatli
- Punch Brothers
- Ricky Skaggs & Kentucky Thunder
- SOJA
- Steep Canyon Rangers
- Toubab Krewe

=== 2013: Rise & Shine ===
- Ben Sollee
- Blitzen Trapper
- Bombino
- Brandi Carlile
- Bronze Radio Return
- Citizen Cope
- Delta Rae
- Donavon Frankenreiter
- Edward Sharpe and the Magnetic Zeros
- Field Report
- GAUDI
- Gigamesh
- Gogol Bordello
- Hogmaw
- Hot Tuna
- Jason Isbell and The 400 Unit
- John Butler Trio
- Lake Street Dive
- Larry and His Flask
- Lizzy Ross Band
- Megan Jean & The KFB
- Michael Kiwanuka
- Nahko and Medicine for the People
- Nick Driver Band
- No BS! Brass Band
- North Mississippi Allstars
- Old Crow Medicine Show
- Option 22
- Primate Fiasco
- Railroad Earth
- Rising Appalachia
- Sanctum Sully
- Spirit Family Reunion
- Tauk
- The Devil Makes Three
- The Hackensaw Boys
- The Infamous Stringdusters
- The Last Bison
- The Lumineers
- The Manx
- Trampled by Turtles
- Xavier Rudd
- Yonder Mountain String Band

=== 2014: Revolutionary ===
- Ben Harper & Charlie Musselwhite
- Ben Miller Band
- Buddy Guy
- Carolina Chocolate Drops
- Conspirator
- Crystal Bright & the Silver Hands
- Donna the Buffalo
- Groundation
- JJ Grey & MOFRO
- Lauryn Hill
- Lettuce
- Michael Franti & Spearhead
- Paper Bird
- Quinn Sullivan
- Ray LaMontagne
- Rising Appalachia
- Robert Randolph and the Family Band
- The Campbell Brothers
- The Duhks
- The Hackensaw Boys
- The Lee Boys
- The London Souls
- Thievery Corporation
- Ziggy Marley
- Mighty Joshua

=== 2015: Fire on the Mountain ===
- American Aquarium
- Blair Crimmins & The Hookers
- Brandi Carlile
- Chris Robinson Brotherhood
- Driftwood
- Drive-by Truckers
- Emmylou Harris & Rodney Crowell
- Fear of Music
- First Aid Kit
- Folk Soul Revival
- Grace Potter and the Nocturnals
- Greensky Bluegrass
- Jerry Douglas Presents The Earls of Leicester
- Keller Williams
- Keller Williams' Grateful Grass with Jeff Austin & Others
- Leftover Salmon
- Lord Huron
- Nicki Bluhm & The Gramblers
- Peter Rowan's Twang 'An Groove
- Rayland Baxter
- Shovels & Rope
- Sirsy
- Sister Sparrow & the Dirty Birds
- The Devil Makes Three
- The Oh Hellos
- Trampled by Turtles
- Trigger Hippy

=== 2016: Dreamweavin' ===
- Gregg Allman
- Bruce Hornsby & The Noisemakers
- Leftover Salmon
- Nahko & Medicine for the People
- Railroad Earth
- Keller Williams w/ More Than A Little+
- Femi Kuti & Positive Force
- Shakey Graves
- The Wood Brothers
- Greensky Bluegrass
- Elephant Revival
- Anders Osborne
- Pimps of Joytime
- Rich Robinson
- Bombino
- Monophonics
- Otis Taylor Band
- The Larry Keel Experience
- Love Canon
- Con Brio
- The Legendary Shack Shakers
- Head for the Hills
- Liz Vice
- Los Colognes
- Roosterfoot
- Look Homeward
- The Midatlantic
- Bloodkin
- The Steepwater Band
- Dead 27s
- Mingo Fishtrap
- The Show Ponies
- Honey Island Swamp Band
- Polyrhythmics
- The Congress
- Banditos
- Caravan of Thieves
- Dead Winter Carpenters
- Dustbowl Revival
- TigermanWOAH!
- These Wild Plains
- Dirty Bangs
- Cask Mouse
- Cactus Attack
- The Hip Abduction

=== 2017: Freedom ===
- Thievery Corporation
- Michael Franti & Spearhead
- St. Paul & the Broken Bones
- Rising Appalachia
- Leftover Salmon
- Steel Pulse
- Railroad Earth
- Shovels & Rope
- Marty Stuart & His Fabulous Superlatives
- Buffalo Mountain Jam
- Xavier Rudd
- White Denim
- Turkuaz
- Fruition
- Keller Williams
- TAUK
- The Steel Wheels
- Larry Keel Experience
- Nicola Cruz
- honeyhoney
- Vurro
- BIG Something
- Shook Twins
- The Hip Abduction
- Baskery
- Zach Deputy
- The Mantras
- Aaron Lee Tasjan
- Fémina
- That 1 Guy
- Dave Eggar Band feat. Sasha Lazard
- The Lil’ Smokies
- People’s Blues of Richmond
- Rebekah Todd & the Odyssey
- Jack Broadbent
- Black Masala
- Hillbilly Casino
- Urban Soil
- Blue Mule
- Che Apalache
- Jordan Harman Band
- M.C. Broom & the Jam
- T Sisters
- Banditos
- Jon Stickley Trio
- The Tillers
- Alanna Royale
- The Stash! Band
- Strange Americans
- Whiskerman
- The Brother Brothers
- Honey Island Swamp Band
- Edward David Anderson
- Dead 27s
- Davy Knowles
- McLovins
- Hayley Jane and the Primates
- Broccoli Samurai
- The Drunken Hearts
- Strange Machines
- Trae Pierce & the T-Stones
- Liver Down The River
- Sol Searchers
- G.O.T.E.
- Black Mountain Revival
- The Wildmans
- Fernandez Sisters
- Einstein’s Monkey
- Girls Rock Roanoke
- Community High School Band
- Jefferson Center Music Lab
- Howard Falco
- Dixon’s Violin
- Miss Kitty’s Cosmonauts
- Luna
- Party Liberation Front

=== 2018: Wild ===
- Foster the People
- Jason Isbell and the 400 Unit
- Old Crow Medecine Show
- Gov't Mule
- The Infamous Stringdusters
- Leftover Salmon
- Tyler Childers
- ZZ Ward
- Hiss Golden Messenger
- Greta Van Fleet
- Keller Williams Petty Grass feat. The Hillbenders
- Antibalas
- Buffalo Mountain Jam
- Nikki Lane
- Lukas Nelson & Promise of the Real
- The Steel Wheels
- Nicki Bluhm
- Langhorne Slim
- Son Little
- The Lil Smokies
- Horses & Hand Grenades
- The Mother Hips
- Lindsay Lou
- No BS! Brass Band
- Devon Gilfillian
- Songs from the Road Band
- Mr. Jennings
- Kaleta & Super Yamba Band
- South Hill Banks
- The Virginia Gentlemen
- Dharma Bombs
- Mapache
- The National Reserve
- The Native Howl
- The Broadcast
- Erin & the Wildfire
- Travis Meadows
- Mama Said String Band
- Che Apalache
- The Harmed Brothers
- The Floorboards
- Fireside Collective
- Sol Searchers
- Blue Mule
- Black Mountain Revival
- My Radio
- Dead Reckoning
- Omegawolfe
- Los Chupacabras
- Gote
- Morgan Wade & the Stepbrothers
- Jordan Harman
- The Jam
- The Mad Iguanas
- Andrew Scottie & the River Rats
- The Antecedents
- Common Center
- The Company Stores
- Dalton Dash
- The Dirty Grass Players
- The Freeway Revival
- Frenchie & the Holy Gems
- Graham Stone Music
- Gryzzle
- The Harwell Grice Band
- The Highballers
- The Hills and the Rivers
- Jesse Daniel Edwards
- Kendall Street Company
- Kid Brother
- Magnolia Boulevard
- Metaphonia
- Old Heavy Hands
- Sid Kingsley
- Stray Local
- Striking Copper
- Travers Brothership
- Vintage Pistol
- Virginia Ground
- Wille De Band
- The Change
- Miss Kitty's Cosmonauts

=== 2019: Voyage Home ===
- The String Cheese Incident
- Brandi Carlile
- Phil Lesh & The Terrapin Family Band
- Kacey Musgraves
- Tyler Childers
- Lukas Nelson & Promise of Real
- Margo Price
- Leftover Salmon
- Fantastic Negrito
- Hot Tuna
- Keller Williams grateful grass ft. Love Cannon
- Karl Denson's Tiny Universe
- The Motet
- Jade Bird
- The War & Treaty
- Kyle Hollingsworth Band
- American Aquarium
- DJ Williams Shots Fired
- New Orleans Suspects
- Acoustic Syndicate
- Buffalo Mountain Jam
- Songs from the Road Band
- The Saturators
- Lillie Mae
- Kaleta & Super Yamba Band
- Becca Mancari
- Trout Steak Revival
- Jon Stickley Trio
- The Works
- Mountain Heart
- Yarn
- Nora Jane Struthers
- Front Country
- Pert Near Sandstone
- Old Salt Union
- The Yawpers
- Bella's Bartock
- Circus No.9
- Honeysuckle
- The Broadcast
- Erin & the Wildfire
- The Virginia Gentlemen
- Sean McConnell
- Pumphouse Blues
- Elise Davis
- L.A. Edwards
- Magnolia Boulevard
- Travers Brothership
- Blue Mule
- Chupacabras
- Dead Reckoning
- Dharma Bombs
- Gote
- Jordan Harman
- Morgan Wade & the Stepbrothers
- Music Road Co.
- My Radio
- Solacoustix
- The Floorboards
- The Jam
- The Wildmans
- Acid Cats
- Arkansauce
- Dark Moon Hollow
- Downtown Abbey & the Echoes
- Driftwood Gypsy
- Mason Via & Hot Trail Mix
- If Birds Could Fly
- Marvelous Funkshun
- The Northerners
- The Volts
- Tuatha Dea
- Vintage Pistol
- Becki the Balloon Lady
- Blackberry Jam
- Cane Mill Road
- Ella & Mary
- Fluidity Performance Troupe
- Gravity Check Juggling
- Gypsy Geoff
- Hoot & Holler Stories
- Hunter Rhodes Medic
- Maya Burgess & Friends
- Miss Ellie's String Band
- Miss Kitty's Cosmonauts
- Community High School Band
- Music Lab at Jefferson Center
- The New River Jam Band
- The World of Good Puppets

=== 2021: Odyssey ===
- The Avett Brothers
- Billy Strings
- Old Crow Medecine Show
- Turkuaz w/ Jerry Harrison & Adrian Belew Remain in Light
- Whiskey Myers
- Goose
- Leftover Salmon
- Keller Williams
- Molly Tuttle
- The Band of Heathens
- Nicole Atkins
- Devon Gilfillian
- Brent Cobb
- Keller & the Keels
- Andy Frasco & the U.N.
- Katie Pruitt
- Acoustic Syndicate
- Buffalo Mountain Jam
- Nicole Atkins All-Star Jam
- Hogslop String Band
- Rebekah Todd & the Odyssey
- Stephen Lewis & the Big Band of Fun
- Mama Said String Band
- Big Daddy Love
- L Shape Lot
- Tara Dente
- Melt
- The Josephines
- Goodnight, Texas
- The GoodFellers
- Lance Thomas
- Abby Bryant & the Echoes
- Hot Trail Mix
- 49 Winchester
- Ashley Heath and Her Heathens
- Bailey Bigger
- Bandits on the Run
- Big Atomic
- Casey Noel
- Chance McCoy
- Christian Lopez
- Darzo
- Dr. Bacon
- Free Union
- Grizzly Goat
- Into the Fog
- Music Road Co.
- Nicholas Jameson & the Morning Jays
- Pressing Strings
- Restless Leg String Band
- Sexbruise?
- Short & Company
- Taylor Scott Band
- Thunder and Rain
- Unaka Prong
- The Ambassador
- Apex
- Blue Mule
- Chupacabras
- The Dead Reckoning
- Dharma Bombs
- Empty Bottles
- Exit 109 Bluegrass
- The Floorboards
- Gote
- Isaac Hadden Project
- The Jam
- James Lagueux Band
- John Mcbroom
- Jordan Harman
- Lazy Man Dub Band
- Mike Mitchell Band
- My Radio
- Orange Culture
- Becki the Balloon Lady
- Black Mountain Revival
- The Blue Ridge Girls
- Community High School Band
- Dylan Underwood
- Einstein's Monkey
- Fluidity Performance Troupe
- Gravity Check Juggling
- Gypsy Geoff
- Hoot & Holler Stories
- Hunter Rhodes Magic
- Magician of Life
- McBurgess
- Miss Kitty's Cosmonauts
- Music Lab at Jefferson Center
- The New River Jam Band
- One Fret Over
- Sara Ernst
- Taryn Collinsworth
- World of Good Puppets

=== 2023:~Forever~ ===
- The Black Crowes
- My Morning Jacket
- Sheryl Crow
- Goose
- Elle King
- Yelawolf and Shooter Jennings Present: Sometimes Y
- Ripe
- Shane Smith and the Saints
- Altin Gün
- Nikki Lane
- The Hip Abduction
- Ian Noe
- Neighbor
- Eggy
- The Wilder Blue
- Palmyra
- The Jared Stout Band

=== 2024:~Horizon~ ===
- Joe Russo's Almost Dead
- Black Pumas
- Charley Crockett
- Sierra Ferrell
- Allen Stone
- The Record Company
- Victor Wooten & The Wooten Brothers
- Sierra Hull
- Circles Around the Sun
- Leftover Salmon
- KellerGrass ft. The HillBenders
- The Heavy Heavy
- Maggie Rose
- Jupiter & Okwess
- Drayton Farley
- Little Stranger
- Orgone
- Sons of the East
- The Nude Party
- S.G. Goodman
- Vincent Neil Emerson
- The Hip Abduction
- Town Mountain
- Cat Clyde
- Eggy
- Neighbor
- The Wilder Blue
- Jaime Wyatt
- Hogslop String Band
- Proxima Parada
- Joe Hertler & The Rainbow Seekers
- Easy Star All-Stars
- The Commonheart
- Sam Burchfield & The Scoundrels
- The Vegabonds
- Caitlin Krisko & The Broadcast
- Ben Chapman
- J & The Causeways
- Grace Bowers
- Sexbruise?
- Colby T. Helms & The Virginia Creepers
- Empire Strikes Brass
- Isaac Hadden Organ Trio
- The Wilson Springs Hotel
- Shawn Mullins
- Hank, Pattie & The Current
- Music Road Co.
- The Tree of Forgiveness Band - A John Prine Tribute
- The Dead Reckoning plays the Allman Brothers
- Palmyra (FF22 On-the-Rise Winner)
- The Jared Stout Band (FF22 On-the-Rise Runner-Up)
- FloydFest 24~Horizon On-the-Rise Competition Class of 2024 - Sponsored by Peluso Microphone Lab & Press Press Merch:
- Boa Boys
- Coral Moons
- Drew Foust & The Wheelhouse
- Happy Landing
- Houseplant
- Mackenzie Roark and The Hotpants
- Ranford Almond
- Swim in the Wild
- The Plate Scrapers
- Virginia Man
- Wood & Bone
- Wyatt Ellis
- FloydFest 24~Horizon 'Local love' Artists:
- Addie Levy
- Annalyse Marie
- Appalachian Space Train
- Blue Mule
- Chad Nickell & The Loose Change
- Cinémathèque
- GOTE
- The Hillside Chaotics
- Isaac Hadden Project
- Leonard Blush & the Camelcals
- Phat Anchovies
- Pumphouse Blues
- Sugarbush
- War Chile
- Bitchin’ Music Group Series:
- Jade Jackson
- Jesse Daniel Edwards
- L.A. Edwards
- Landon Pigg
- The Master Speed
- Floyd Country Store Workshop Porch Artists:
- DeShawn Hickman Presents Sacred Steel
- Dori Freeman
- Handmade Music School
- Justin Golden & Devil’s Coattails
- Larry Sigmon & The Virginia Girls
- Lonesome River Band
- Martha Spencer
- Nobody’s Business
- Raistlin Brabson & Margo MacSweeney
- Sarah Kate Morgan
- Twin Creeks Stringband

=== 2025:~Aurora~ ===
- The Black Crowes
- Dallan carbone
- Gov't Mule
- JJ Grey & Mofro
- The California Honeydrops
- Futurebirds
- Femi Kuti & The Positive Force
- Cimafunk
- Geese
- The Travelin’ McCourys Presents The Grateful Ball
- Maggie Rose
- LA LOM (Los Angeles League of Musicians)
- The Brothers Comatose
- Big Something
- LaMP (Russ Lawton, Scott Metzger, Ray Paczkowski)
- Aly & AJ
- Hans Williams
- Toubab Krewe
- Caitlin Krisko & The Broadcast
- Chaparelle
- The Free Label
- Theo Lawrence
- Sam Morrow
- Kelsey Waldon
- Big Richard
- Eddie 9V
- Nat Myers
- Diggin Dirt
- Isaac Hadden
- Bella's Bartok
- Seth James
- The Point
- Cha Wa
- Hippies & Cowboys
- Lady Couch
- Tan & Sober Gentlemen
- Brass Queens
- Mackenzie Roark & the Hotpants (2024 On-the-Rise Winner)
- Ranford Almond (2024 On-the-Rise Runner-Up)
- Jeremie Albino
- Chris Smither
- Clover Country
- Palm Palm
- Abby Bryant
- Red Panda
- Peen
- Paul Cauthen
- The Original Wailers Feat. Al Anderson
- The Last Revel
- Chuck Prophet and His Cumbia Shoes
- Crowe Boys
- Holy Roller
- The Jared Stout Band
- Stimulator Jones
- Marc Ridge & The Revelers
- Blue Mule
- Christian Quesenberry
- Cinémathèque
- Empty Bottles
- Father Sun
- Freak Rangers
- GOTE
- Jatoba
- Kerosene Willy
- Leonard Blush & The Camelcals
- Mountain Walrus
- Ripejive
- Solacoustix
- The Sugar Hollows
- HASH the Band

=== 2026:~Daydream~ ===
- Tedeschi Trucks Band
- My Morning Jacket
- Stephen Wilson Jr
- Lukas Nelson
- Larkin Poe
- The Word
- Andy Frasco & The UN
- AMBLE
- AJ Lee & Blue Summit
- Railroad Earth
- The Dip
- The Creekers
- Penelope Road
- Chuck Prophet & His Cumbia Shoes
- Tyler Ramsey & Carl Broemel
- Caitlin Krisko & The Bropadcast
- Jason Scott & The High Heat
- LESPECIAL
- Bronwyn Keith-Hynes
- Tyler Ramsey & Carl Broemel
- Parlor Greens
- MT Jones
- Zion Marley
- Zach Person
- Cruz Contreras & The BHlack Lillies
- Coyote Island
- Johnny Mullenax
- Supertaste
- Brother Wallace
- The Animeros
- Denitia
- Isaac Hadden
- Can Clark & His Orchestra
- Joslyn & The Sweet Compression
- Mama Said String Band
- Canyon Lights
- Bella Rayne
- The Weird Sisters
- Music Road Co
- Big Daddy Love plays MO-GRASS
- William Seyomour's Songwriter Showcase
- Florencia & The Feeling (2025 ON-THE-RISE Winner)
- HASH The Band (2025 ON-THE-RISE Runner Up)
- Free Whenever
- Frute (
- Late Night Special
- Moga Family Band
- New Translations
- Renee Christine
- Stone Throwers
- Tand
- Teddy & The Rough Riders
- Blue Mule
- Cassidy Snider & The Wranglers
- Corey Hunley & The Millionaires
- Father Sun
- Freak Rangers
- Jatoba
- John & Friends
- Kerosene Willy
- Leonard Blush & The Camelcals
- RIPEJIVE
- Solacoustix
- The Sugar Hollows
- Virginia Electric

=== 2027: Echoes ===
Announced performers include:

- Ziggy Marley
- Marcus King Band
- Jesse Welles
- Evan Honer
- Kashus Culpepper
- Mo Lowda & the Humble
- The Band Loula
- Shadowgrass
- Eggy
- Hannah Dasher
- Magoo
- Johnny Mullenax
- Jacoozy (2026 On-the-Rise Winner)
- Frute (2026 On-the-Rise Runner-Up)

== Reviews ==
FloydFest

Voted "Best Large Music Venue in Southwestern Virginia" by Virginia Living

FloydFest '04

"Some larger festivals boast a similar peace, love and music philosophy, but Floyd actually lives it, not just for one weekend, but throughout the entire year."

FloydFest '05

"Floyd sits in a timeless, beautiful section of Virginia, far enough from bigger cities like Roanoke and Danville to feel like it's truly in the middle of nowhere."

"The only thing constant on the festival grounds was the flow of culturally powerful music and mud covered feet."

FloydFest '08

"Floydfest is an epicenter of culture for Southwest Virginia" - Virginia Senator, Mark Warner
