= Egy =

Egy may be:

- the ISO 639 code for the Egyptian language
- an abbreviation of Egypt

== See also ==
- Eggy (disambiguation)
- Egi (disambiguation)
- Quartetto Egie
