= Foundation Stone (disambiguation) =

Foundation Stone is the name of the rock situated under the Dome of the Rock on Temple Mount in Jerusalem.

== Music ==
Foundation Stone, the name of a music band; see FloydFest

== See also ==
- Foundation stone or cornerstone, the first stone of a structure
