= Blue laser (disambiguation) =

A blue laser is a laser that emits electromagnetic radiation with a wavelength 360–480nm, which the human eye sees as blue or violet.

Blue laser may also refer to:

- Blue Laser, an evil organization from the Cheat Commandos cartoon series

== See also ==
- Blu-ray, a digital optical disc data storage format
- Blues and Lasers, an American band
- Laser (disambiguation)
