= Holy Ghost Tent Revival =

American rock and roll band

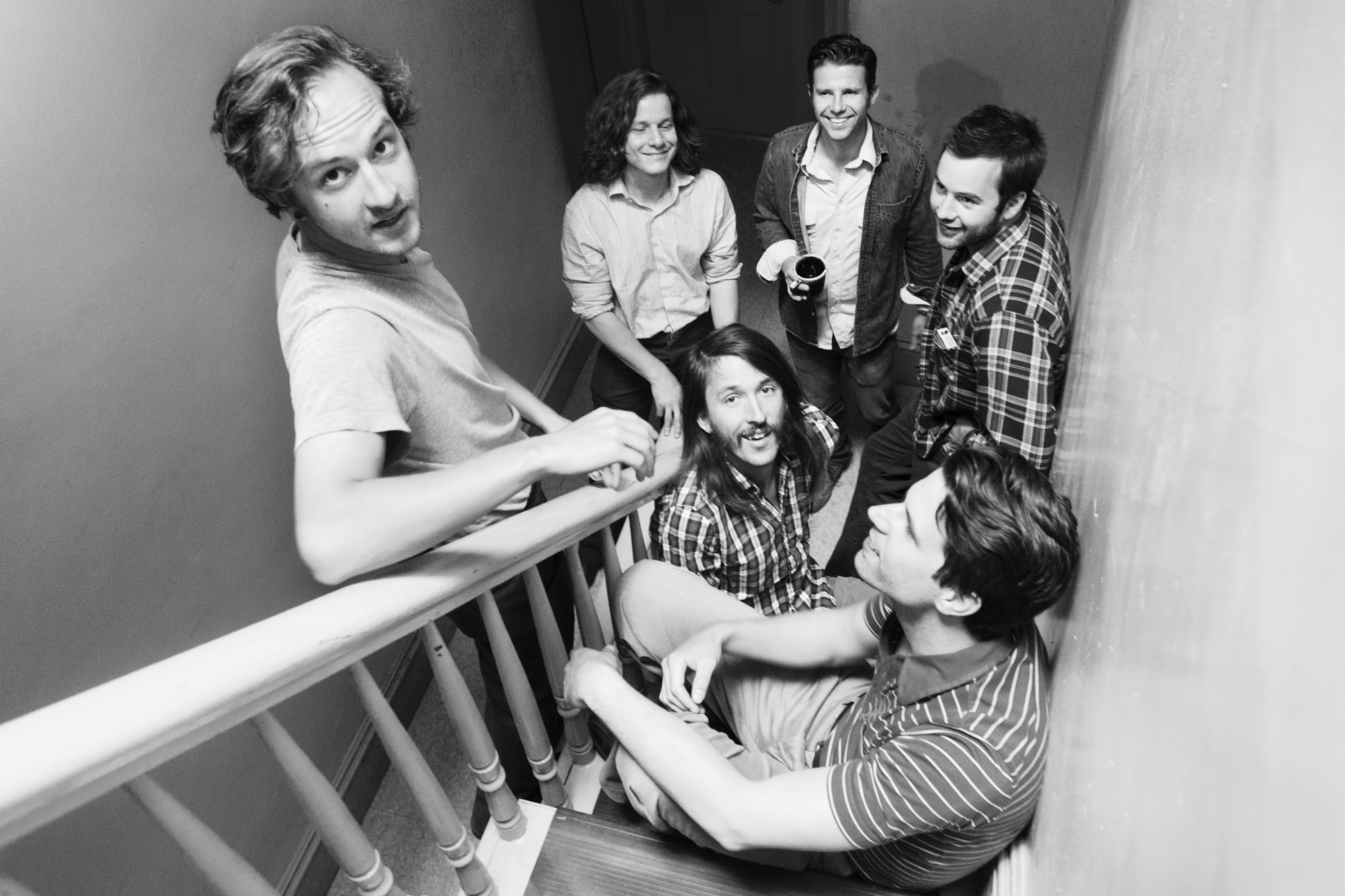
- The band in 2014

Background information
- Origin: Greensboro, North Carolina
- Genres: Rock and roll, soul, folk rock, blues, ragtime
- Years active: 2007–present
- Members: Stephen Murray, Dulci Ellenberger, Kevin Williams, Matt Martin, James "Ross" Montsinger, Henry Widmer, Charlie Humphrey
- Past members: Richard Sprecker, Josh Lovings, Mike O'Malley, Patrick “PJ” Leslie
- Website: http://www.holyghosttentrevival.com

Holy Ghost Tent Revival (now known as Moves or Big Sound Harbor) is an American horn-driven rock and roll band with blues and folk leanings. Formed in North Carolina in 2008, current members are Stephen Murray, Dulci Ellenberger, Kevin Williams, Matt Martin, Ross Montsinger, Henry Widmer and Charlie Humphrey. They've released three studio albums, and the band tours frequently; in 2010 that included approximately 300 shows per year, including festivals such as Shakori Hills Grassroots Festival, Bristol Rhythm & Roots, Floyd Fest and Wakarusa. Paste Magazine described their style as "soul-inspired rock that maintains a rootsy sound, brightened by warm swells of horns and rich harmonies.”

== History ==
=== Founding ===
Holy Ghost Tent Revival was first founded in Greensboro, North Carolina in February 2007. The original founding members, Stephen Murray (vocals, guitar) and Matt Martin (lead guitar, vocals), began writing music together while both pursued acting degrees at Greensboro College. In the beginning, they casually wrote songs together, and it wasn't long before Hank Widmer (trombone, clarinet) and Josh Lovings (trumpet) joined the group. After starting to perform around campus, they added bass player PJ Leslie and finally Ross Montsinger on drums, then spent several years with a changing lineup, adding piano into the instrumental lineup. The band began touring in earnest in the summer of 2007, once most of the members had graduated.

=== Touring, early releases ===
So Long I Screamed (2008)

"With the mischievous air of a Mark Twain yarn, So Long I Screamed conjures images of eras spent rambling from town to town, hopping between riverboats and trains, joshing with the locals, romancing with their daughters, and throwing back whiskey on the sly."
— IndyWeek

Their debut full-length album So Long I Screamed was released on December 14, 2008. Allmusic gave So Long I Screamed a score of 4/5, stating that "the songs, although they initially seem like loosely constructed affairs, are actually tightly crafted pop gems with timeless melodies, great harmonies, and subject matter that more often than not circles around the craziness of love, all delivered with an immediate and organic rush of joy."

The album incorporates multiple genres, blending various instruments traditionally used across those genres. Indy Week stated that "Holy Ghost punctuates ragtime with horns, pierces jump blues with shouts, and peppers folk with barbershop style. IndyWeek also praised the imagery and storytelling, much of which refers to antiquated American scenes.

Touring, live albums

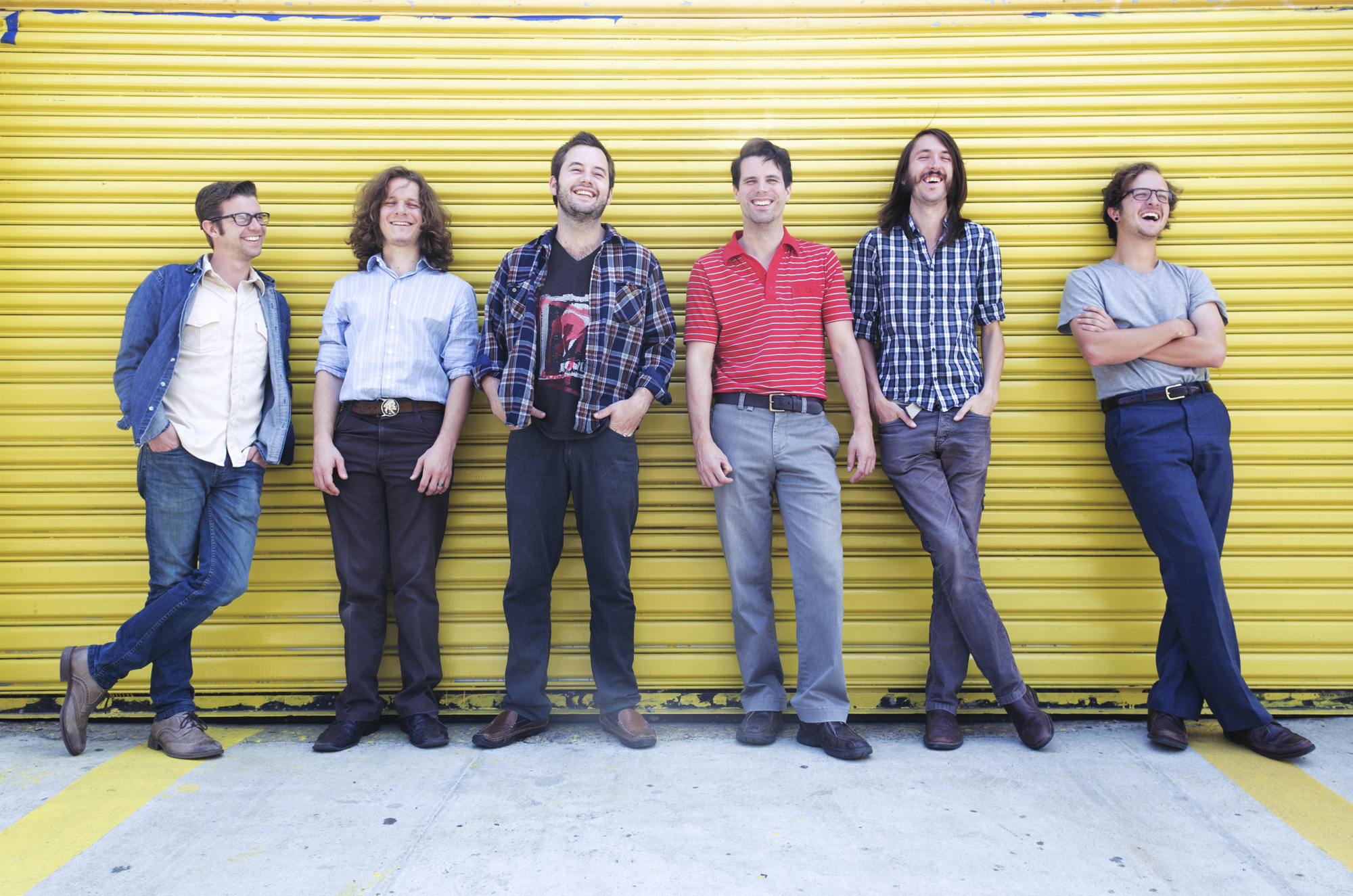
The band in 2014

Since 2011 the band has played around 150 shows annually, with festivals including Shakori Hills Grassroots Festival, Bristol Rhythm & Roots, Floyd Fest and Wakarusa. They toured the most heavily in 2009 and 2010 playing nearly 300 shows annually.

Family EP (2009)

The band's first EP and follow-up to So Long I Screamed is titled Family, and was recorded with contributions from several local guest musicians. This collective of contributors is credited as The Lovely Hot Starving Street Band on the album, which is an anagram of the name Holy Ghost Tent Revival. Family was released on September 18, 2009 on Good Ship Records.

Northbound at Southpaw (2010)

On July 24, 2010 they released the live album Northbound at Southpaw, recorded at the Brooklyn venue Southpaw in 2009. New York Music Daily stated, "On their live album rambunctious electric piano mingles with Hank Widmer’s trombone to add a jaunty ragtime flavor over the electric guitars, bass and drums. A lot of the songs here sound like the Wiyos gone electric, with a brisk shuffle beat, tasteful high-energy playing and lots of vocal harmonies. This isn’t particularly dark music but it’s smart and it’s a lot of fun – and it’s absolutely original."

=== Recent albums and projects ===
Sweat Like The Old Days (2012)

Holy Ghost Tent Revival's second full-length album Sweat Like The Old Days was released on September 4, 2012. The Daily Tarheel stated the album showed growth from their first 2008 release, and that Sweat Like the Old Days "melds the goodness of Bourbon Street-style jazz and Appalachian folk into a solid toe-tapping release. Timeless as the record sounds, it maintains the lush animation and instrumentation of contemporary indie rock, providing an invigorating modernity that prevents the album from sounding the least bit stale. It’s a celebration of times and relationships come and gone, delving into a musical box of memories with effortless style." Around 2012 trumpeter Charlie Humphrey joined the group.

Alive at the Southern and The Blood Beneath (2013)

In 2013, the band released two digital-only albums, one live and one previously unreleased studio album (originally slated for release in 2010). Alive at the Southern, a live album recorded in November 2012, at the Southern in Charlottesville, where the band opened for Charleston, SC duo Shovels & Rope was released in April. The Blood Beneath was released in June, and according to the release description on the band's bandcamp, "contains in it the voices and musical stylings of our old buds Patrick Leslie and Mike O'Malley and was recorded over the course of some blistery days, in January of 2010."

"Right State Of Mind" (2014)

In 2014, the band raised nearly $23,000 in a successful Kickstarter for their album Right State of Mind, which was released on September 16. It was recorded in Philadelphia with producer Bill Moriarty (who has worked with Dr. Dog, Man Man, and The Sheepdogs amongst others). and brings a refined maturity to their unique tone.

"Summer Jelly EP" (2016)

This pay-what-you-want/can EP contains recording of four of the band's jams.

== Style ==
Initial albums

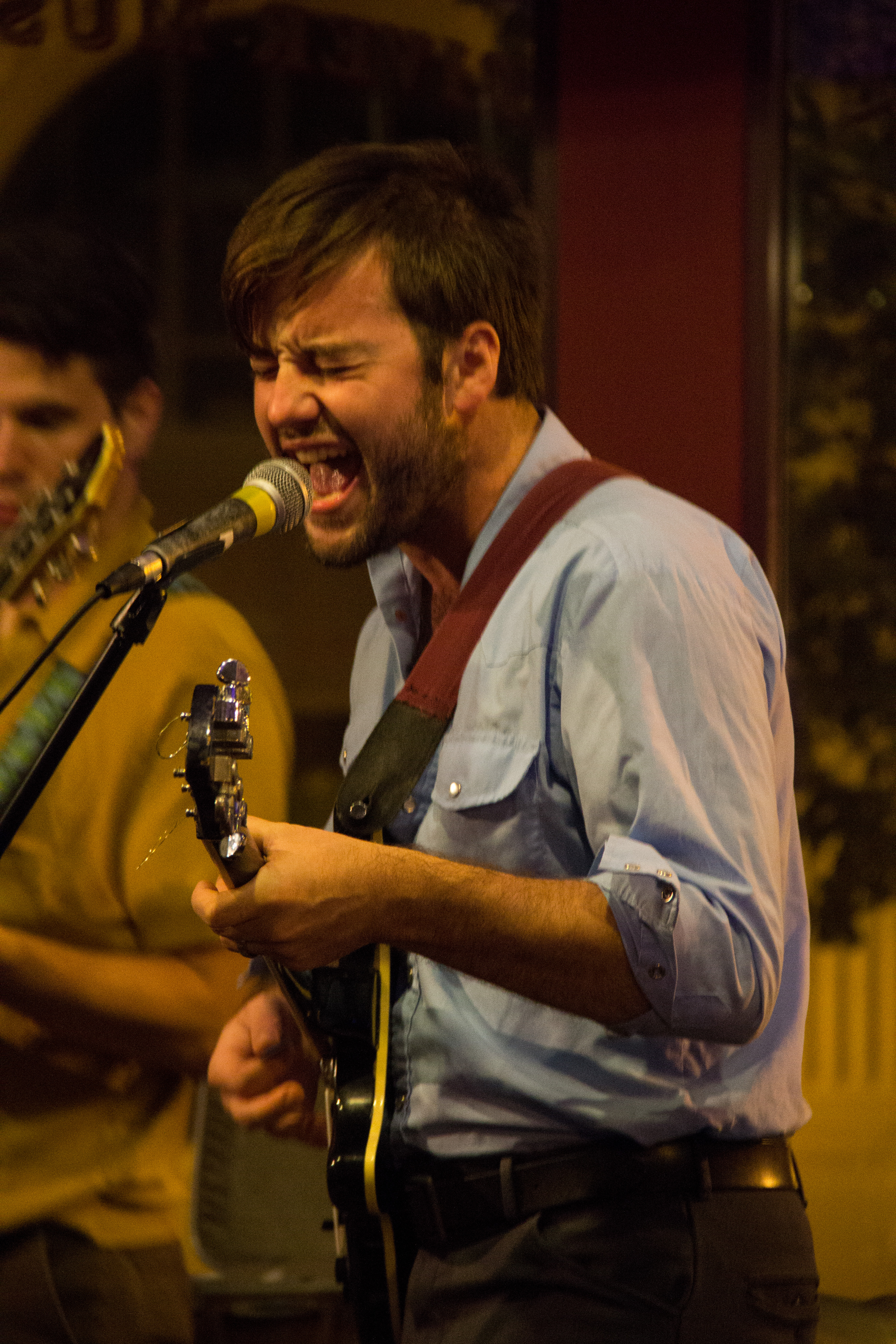
Holy Ghost Tent Revival

The group members write the music together, using a rotating and diverse array of instruments in a style the band self-defines as "horn-driven rock and roll experience." Allmusic stated early on that "The raucous six-piece band plays a lot on the bluegrass festival circuit, but they sure aren't bluegrass...although they do play essentially acoustic and there are banjos aboard. They're sort of like a jug band, too, but with a rock and pop sensibility...gone south into the land of indie rock."

NPR described them as "a soul-rock horn band that recalls '60s and '70s classic-rock influences such as The Band and The Flying Burrito Brothers, contemporary indie-rock acts like Dr. Dog, and New Orleans brass-band jazz." Paste Magazine described their sound as "soul-inspired rock that maintains a rootsy sound, brightened by warm swells of horns and rich harmonies.”

Later sound

In an interview with No Depression in 2013, member Stephen Murray stated,"It started off very Dixieland and ragtime, and right now we’re so much into the ‘60s and ‘70s, like horn-rock, The Band and The Stones and The Beatles, kind of just like really groovy. R&B is starting to be a huge influence on us now, with the newer tunes. So yeah, I tell people we’re a ‘60s rock band with horns."

After the members started listening heavily to bands such as The Band and 1960s rock such as The Kinks, their sound naturally began to change. Lead guitarist Matt Martin stated "We got caught up in the whole bluegrass and acoustic thing a few years ago, but we never knew that we were actually a rock and roll band in disguise. I’ve wanted to expand my sound and go more electric...you fill the room up with sound a lot more with two electric guitars, as opposed to an acoustic guitar and a banjo."

Several critics noted the change in the band's sound, stating the band "has morphed from an eclectic and fun quintet that mixed bluegrass influences with ragtime into a horn-driven soul and rock group with New Orleans-influenced grooves. Gone is the banjo, as electric guitars have taken center stage in the band’s sound, which is backed by a steady and upbeat horn section."

== Members ==
Current as of 2014

- Stephen Niall Murray - vocals, guitar
- Dulci Ellenberger - vocals, guitar, aux per
- Kevin Williams - vocals, bass guitar, piano
- Matthew Elliott Martin - lead guitar, vocals
- James "Ross" Montsinger - drums
- Henry Napheys Widmer - trombone, euphonium, clarinet, piano, vocals
- Charles Perkins Humphrey - trumpet, piano

Past

- Patrick “PJ” Leslie - bass
- Richard Sprecker
- Josh Lovings
- Mike O'Malley

== Discography ==
=== Albums ===
List of studio and live albums by Holy Ghost Tent Revival
Year	Album title	Release details
2008	So Long I Screamed	Released: Dec 14, 2008, 2013; Label: self-released/Soul Step Records (SSR-004); Format: Vinyl, digital, CD
2010	Northbound at Southpaw (live album)	Released: July 24, 2010; Label: self-released/Good Ship Records; Format: Digital, CD
2012	Sweat Like The Old Days	Released: Sep 4, 2012; Label: self-released/Good Ship Records; Format: Vinyl, digital, CD
2013	Alive at the Southern (live album)	Released: April 23, 2013; Label: self-released; Format: Digital
2013	The Blood Beneath	Released: June 10, 2013; Label: self-released; Format: Digital
2014	Right State Of Mind	Released: Sep 16, 2014; Label: self-released/Who Is We Are; Format: Vinyl, digital, CD

=== EPs ===
List of EPs by Holy Ghost Tent Revival
Year	EP title	Release details
2009	Family (with The Lovely Hot Starving Street Band)	Released: Sep 18, 2009; Label: Good Ship Records; Format: 12" vinyl, CD
2016	Summer Jelly	Released: June 3, 2016; Format: CD

=== Singles ===
Incomplete list of songs by Holy Ghost Tent Revival
Year	Title	Album	Release notes
2012	"Alpha Dogs"	Promo single/Sweat Like the Old Days	Released Aug 1, 2012
2013	"Broken Spirit"	Promo single/Alive at the Southern	Released April 24, 2013
2014	"Right State Of Mind"	Promo single/Right State Of Mind	Released August 5, 2014
