= Moonsville Collective =

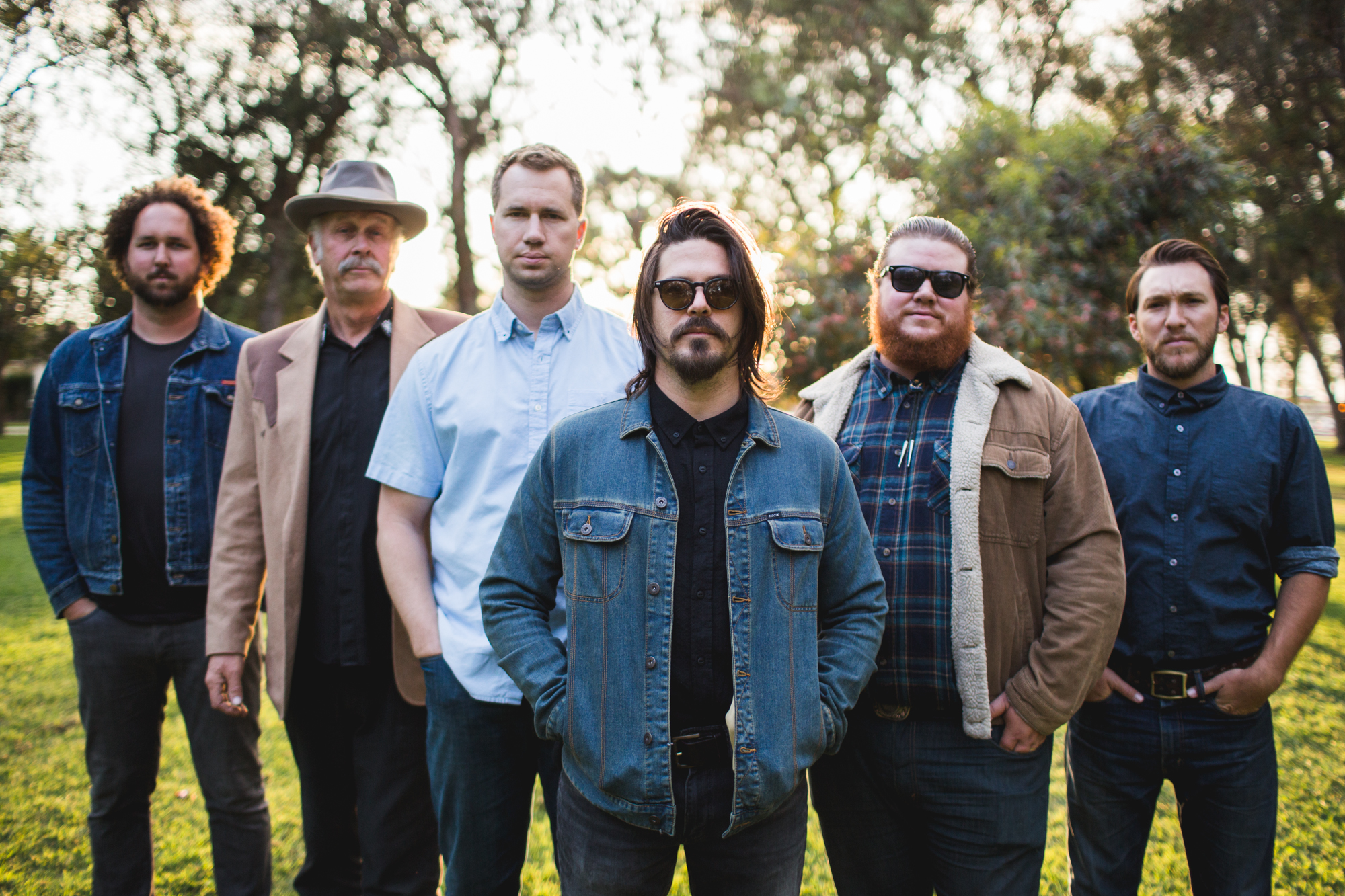

Background information
- Origin: Orange County, California, United States
- Genres: Americana, old-time, string band
- Years active: 2011–present
- Label: Rock Ridge Music
- Members: Corey Adams, Seth Richardson, Dan Richardson, Matt McQueen, Phillip Glenn
- Past members: Sean Kibler, Drew Martin, Bill Bell, Ryan Welch
- Website: http://www.moonsvillecollective.com

Moonsville Collective is an Americana string band based out of Los Angeles, California

== Background ==
Born out of community jam sessions, Moonsville Collective launched in 2011 as a roots "supergroup" in Orange County, California, playing over 250 shows in California, Nevada and Utah during their first two years. They have shared the stage with many well known acts such as Willie Watson (Old Crow Medicine Show), Donavon Frankenreiter, The White Buffalo, Wanda Jackson, Frank Fairfield, Rose's Pawn Shop, Restaurant & The Dustbowl Revival. Moonsville Collective has headlined many of the local music festivals in Orange County, Los Angeles, Long Beach and Ojai, and have become a consistent fixture in the Southern California Americana community.

=== Awards ===
The band won “Best Country/Americana Band” at the 2013 OC Music Awards, as well as being named both “2012 Best Live Band” by OC Weekly and “Best Bluegrass/Americana Band in Orange County” by CBS Los Angeles.

=== Members ===
Moonsville Collective has five members: Father and son team "Dobro" Dan Richardson and upright bass Seth Richardson, lead vocalists & Guitar Corey Adams, mandolinist Matthew McQueen, & Phil Glenn on Fiddle & Vocals. The original lineup featured Ryan Welch, fiddle player Bill Bell and long-time drummer Drew Martin, and fiddle player Sean Kibler.

== Albums ==
The group self-released two albums in early 2013, "Cradle to the Grave" (January, 2013) and "Salamander Sessions" (February, 2013), the latter of which is a live album of mostly traditional songs. Both albums were re-released as a double disc set under Nashville based Indie label Rock Ridge Music, whom they signed with in November 2014. In October 2015 the band released the long awaited full length album "Heavy Howl" to critical acclaim. Also released through Rock Ridge Music, Heavy Howl showcased many of the group's strong instrumental abilities alongside the timeless songwriting styles of singers Ryan Welch and Corey Adams. The band followed up Heavy with a series of self titled EP's known as Moonsville I-V that saw the band exercise a more electric folk sound, incorporating much more piano and electric guitar than prior releases. In 2023, Moonsville announced the arrival of a new full length record, A Hundred Highways, to be released in April of 2024 on Rock Ridge Music.
