= Mama Said String Band =

American bluegrass band

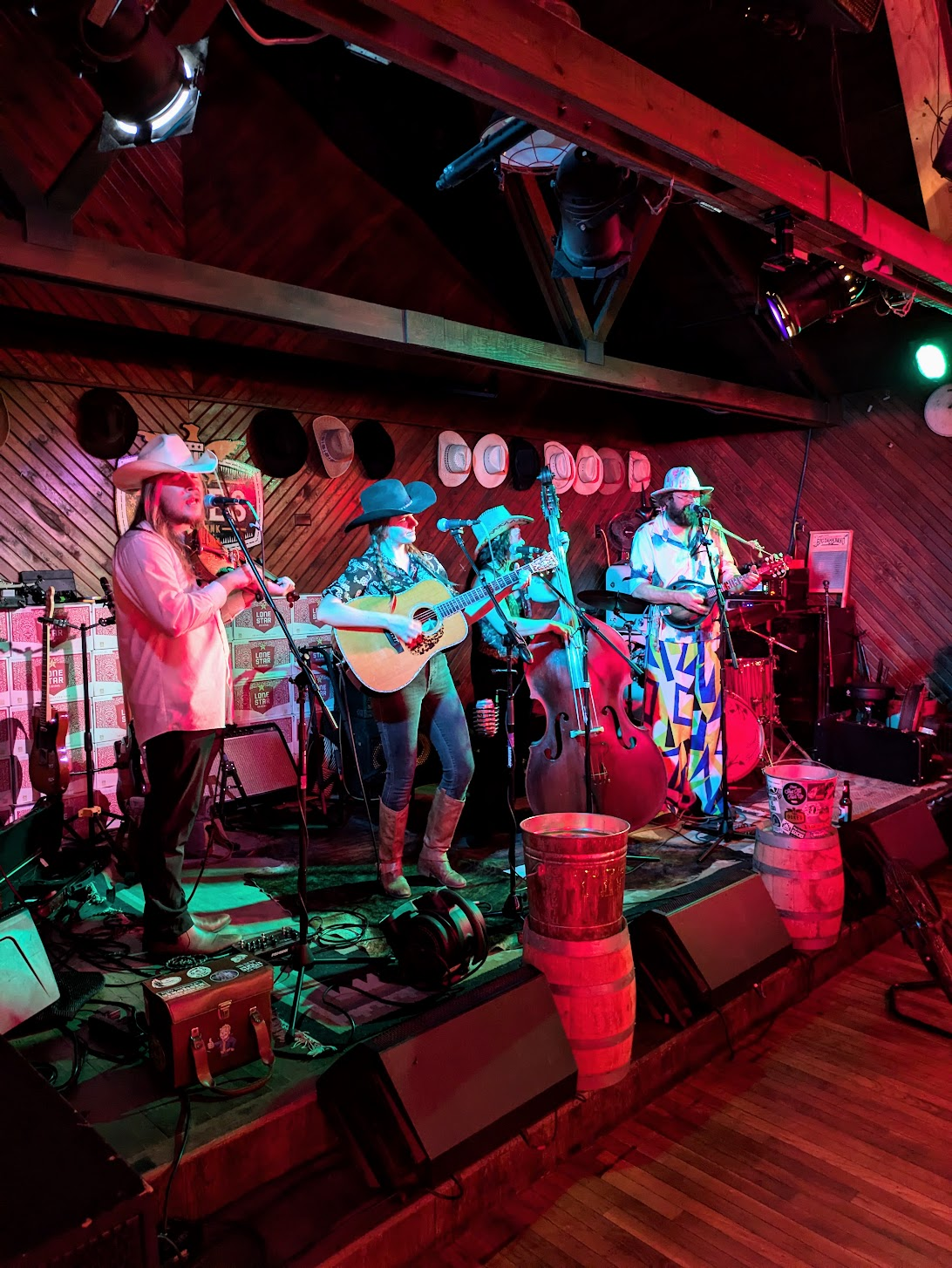

Background information
- Origin: Louisville, Kentucky, U.S.
- Genres: Bluegrass, Americana, Folk
- Years active: 2016–present
- Members: David O'Neal; Katie "Didit" Caudill; Kaitlen Farmer; Kris Potts
- Website: www.mamasaidstringband.com

Mama Said String Band is an American bluegrass band formed in 2016 and based in Louisville, Kentucky. The band's current members are David O'Neal on vocals and strings, Katie "Didit" Caudill (vocals and upright bass), Kaitlen Farmer (vocals and guitar), and Kris Potts (vocals and mandolin). Their music incorporates elements of Bluegrass, Folk, and Americana. In 2020, the band was awarded best album of the year for their sophomore album Carry the Water by the Lexington Music Awards. They were also the named Best Bluegrass Band in the Appalachian Arts and Entertainment Awards and, in 2025, Bluegrass Artist of the Year in the Lexington Music Awards.

== History ==
Two years after their formation, in 2018, Mama Said String Band released their self-titled debut album.

In 2020, the band became a four-piece group after two founding members departed and banjo player Taylor Shuck joined the lineup. On February 5, 2021, they released Mariah, a four-song EP recorded and produced at Nitrosonic Studios in Lexington, Kentucky.

In 2023, Mama Said released the full-length, 12-track album Seasons of Change featuring guest artists Jonathan Goodwin (piano), Chris Cupp (cello), and Logan Henry (pedal steel). The album was recorded at Darkhorse Recording in Franklin, Tennessee and produced by Jonathon Goodwin at Good1 Productions in Lexington, Kentucky.

Mama Said has performed at numerous regional and national music festivals, including Railbird Festival, FloydFest, ROMP Bluegrass Festival, Moonshiner's Ball, Blue Ox Music Festival, Hookahville, the John Hartford Memorial Festival, and others.

In late 2020, they performed at the Kentucky Music Hall of Fame's Artist-in-Residence series.

=== Previous members ===
- Taylor Shuck – banjo
- Aldai Filiatreau – guitar
- Stephanie Kidd – guitar

=== Current members ===
- Katie "Didit" Caudill – bass, vocals
- David O'Neal – strings, vocals
- Kaitlen Farmer – guitar, vocals
- Kris Potts – mandolin

== Style and influences ==
Mama Said String Band's music is informed by American grassroots traditions, blending elements of Bluegrass, Folk, and Americana with an emphasis on vocal harmonies since all four band members perform as vocalists. While they draw on traditional Kentucky Bluegrass, the band is also known for their contemporary arrangements and genre-bending performances. Their style has been described as a creative reinvention of grassroots string music, combining tight harmonies with instrumental interplay that appeals to both traditionalists and newer audiences.

== Discography ==
=== Albums ===
- Mama Said String Band (2018)
- Carry the Water (2023)

=== EPs and singles ===
- Mariah (2021)
- "Feel This Blue" (2023)
- "Buy the Ticket, Take the Ride" (2024)
- "Don't Sweat the Small Stuff" (2025)
- "SnowDrops" (2025)
- "Numb Goodbyes" (2025)
