= EGI =

Egi or EGI may refer to:

== Organizations ==
- Editors Guild of India, an Indian journalism organisation
- Europe-Georgia Institute, a Georgian non-governmental organisation
- Edward Grey Institute of Field Ornithology at Oxford University, England
- Euzko Gaztedi, the youth wing of the Basque Nationalist Party
- Excel Group Institutions, an Indian educational institution

== People ==
- Egi Kazuyuki (1853–1932), Japanese politician
- Egi Melgiansyah (born 1990), Indonesian footballer

== Other uses ==
- Duke Field (IATA: EGI), a military airport in Florida, United States
- Egi Station, in Maebashi, Gunma, Japan
- European Grid Infrastructure, a European high-throughput computing effort
