= Jatobá =

Jatobá may refer to:

- Hymenaea courbaril, tree common to the Caribbean, Central, and South America
- Jatobá, Maranhão, municipality in Brazil
- Jatobá, Pernambuco, city in Brazil
- Jatobá Hydroelectric Power Plant, planned hydroelectric plant on the Tapajós river in Brazil
- Jatobá do Piauí, municipality in Brazil
- Jatobá River, river in eastern Brazil
- Jatobá (footballer, born 1963), Carlos Roberto Jatobá, Brazilian footballer
- Jatobá (footballer, born 1995), Carlos Eduardo Bacila Jatobá, Brazilian footballer
- Anna Carolina Jatobá, perpetrator of the Isabella Nardoni case
