= Big Richard =

Colorado bluegrass supergroup

- Origin: Colorado
- Genres: Bluegrass
- Years active: 2021–present
- Label: Signature Sounds
- Members: Bonnie Sims; Eve Panning; Hazel Royer; Joy Adams
- Past members: Emma Rose

Big Richard is a bluegrass quartet supergroup from Colorado. They have played Cavern Sessions, World Cafe, Telluride Bluegrass Festival, Delfest, Bourbon and Beyond, Jam Cruise, and the Ryman in Nashville.

== Discography ==
- Live from Telluride (2022)
- Girl Dinner (2025)
- Pet (2026)

== Band members ==
=== Current members ===
- Bonnie Sims - Mandolin
- Eve Panning - Violin
- Hazel Royer - Bass
- Joy Adams - Cello

=== Former members ===
- Emma Rose - Bass, guitar
