= Jatobá do Piauí =

Coordinates: 4.77083°S 41.8178°W

- Municipality
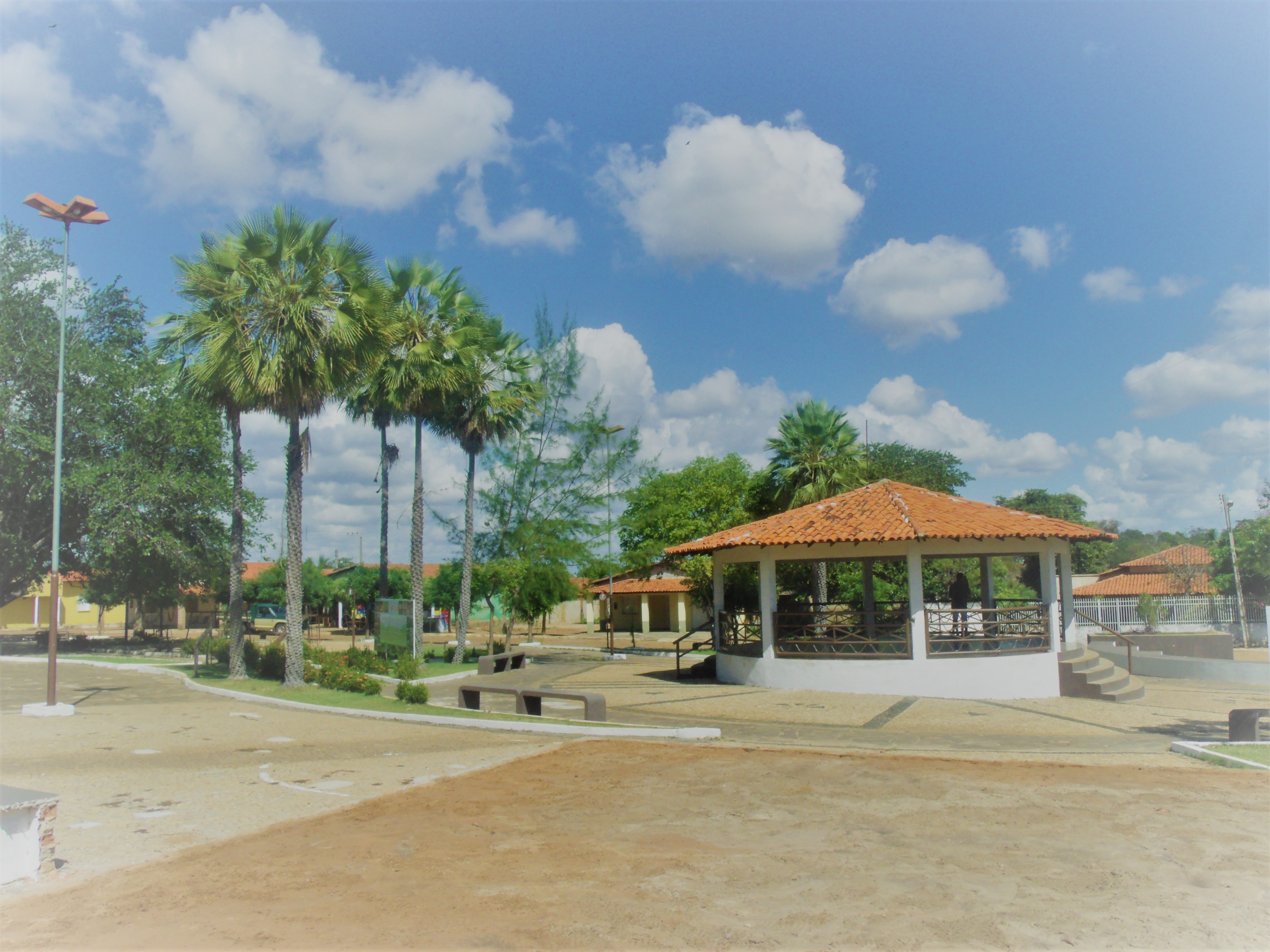

- Flag
- Nickname: Terra da Melancia (Watermelon Land)
- Location of Jatobá do Piauí in the State of Piauí
- Country: Brazil
- Region: Northeast
- State: Piauí
- Mesoregion: Centro-Norte Piauiense
- Founded: December 14, 1995

Government
  - Mayor: José Carlos Gomes Bandeira PT

Population (2020)
  - Total: 4,875
- Time zone: UTC−3 (BRT)

Jatobá do Piauí is a municipality in the state of Piauí in the Northeast region of Brazil.

== See also ==
- List of municipalities in Piauí
