= Howard Falco =

Author

- Education: Arizona State University
- Occupations: Author, speaker and spiritual teacher
- Notable work: I AM: The Power of Discovering Who You Really Are
- Website: howardfalco.com

Howard Falco is an American self empowerment expert, author, speaker and spiritual teacher who specializes in the power of the mind as it relates to the creation of life experiences. He is the author of I AM: The Power of Discovering Who You Really Are. He currently resides in Arizona with his wife and two children.

== Early career and spiritual awakening ==
Originally from the suburbs of Chicago, Falco has said that during his childhood he wasn't connected to any religion or spiritual upbringing. He attended Arizona State University, graduated with a business degree and entered the finance world. At the age of 35, he had what he describes as an "expansion in awareness," when he realized that money wouldn't solve his problems and he wanted to know the source of true happiness. He has said this awakening wasn't the result of one event, but rather a collection of things that had happened in his life, leading up to a breakthrough.

Over the period of six months he had two life-changing experiences, the first being "a realization of his infinite nature" that was triggered at a financial seminar he attended on the concept of belief, which made him realize he was in control of the experiences of his life, which lead him to ask more questions about the nature of life. This resulted in a second experience which he has said was "a radical and profound expansion of consciousness that revealed the reasons for all human behavior, actions and reactions, joy and suffering." This event resulted in the writing of his book.

== I AM ==
I AM: The Power of Discovering Who You Really Are was published by the Penguin Group on September 2, 2010. The book is intended as a guide to giving people their own expanded awareness regarding their creative natures and purpose, with advice on managing and dealing with stressful situations, overcoming any addictions or challenges and how to take conscious control over the experience of one's life. It's laid out in a progressive movement, divided into "what," "why", "how" and "who", in order to establish a foundation of an identity for the reader, concluding with a question and answer process for readers to learn more about themselves and what is possible for them. The book has also been published in Spanish under the title Yo Soy: El Poder de Descubrir Quien Eres. It's now available in 11 countries.

Tampa Bay Rays pitcher Chris Archer has credited the book with his success in major league pitching. He first mentioned in an interview for MLB.com that he was reading I AM. Following this interview, he met with Falco over dinner to discuss the book and ask questions, saying "it was like a meeting of the minds."

== Time in a Bottle: Mastering the Experience of Life ==
Falco's second book, entitled Time in a Bottle: Mastering the Experience of Life, was scheduled to be released in April 2014.

== Speaking, coaching and writing ==
Falco conducts speaking engagements on the topics addressed in I AM. He works with individuals to improvement their performance in sports, business and their personal lives. He also writes regularly for MindBodyGreen.

== Bibliography ==
- Howard Falco, I AM: The Power of Discovering Who You Really Are, Penguin Group (USA) Incorporated, 2010
- Howard Falco, Yo Soy: El Poder de Descubrir Quien Eres, Grupo Edit Norma, 2011
