= Banditos (band) =

American rock and roll band

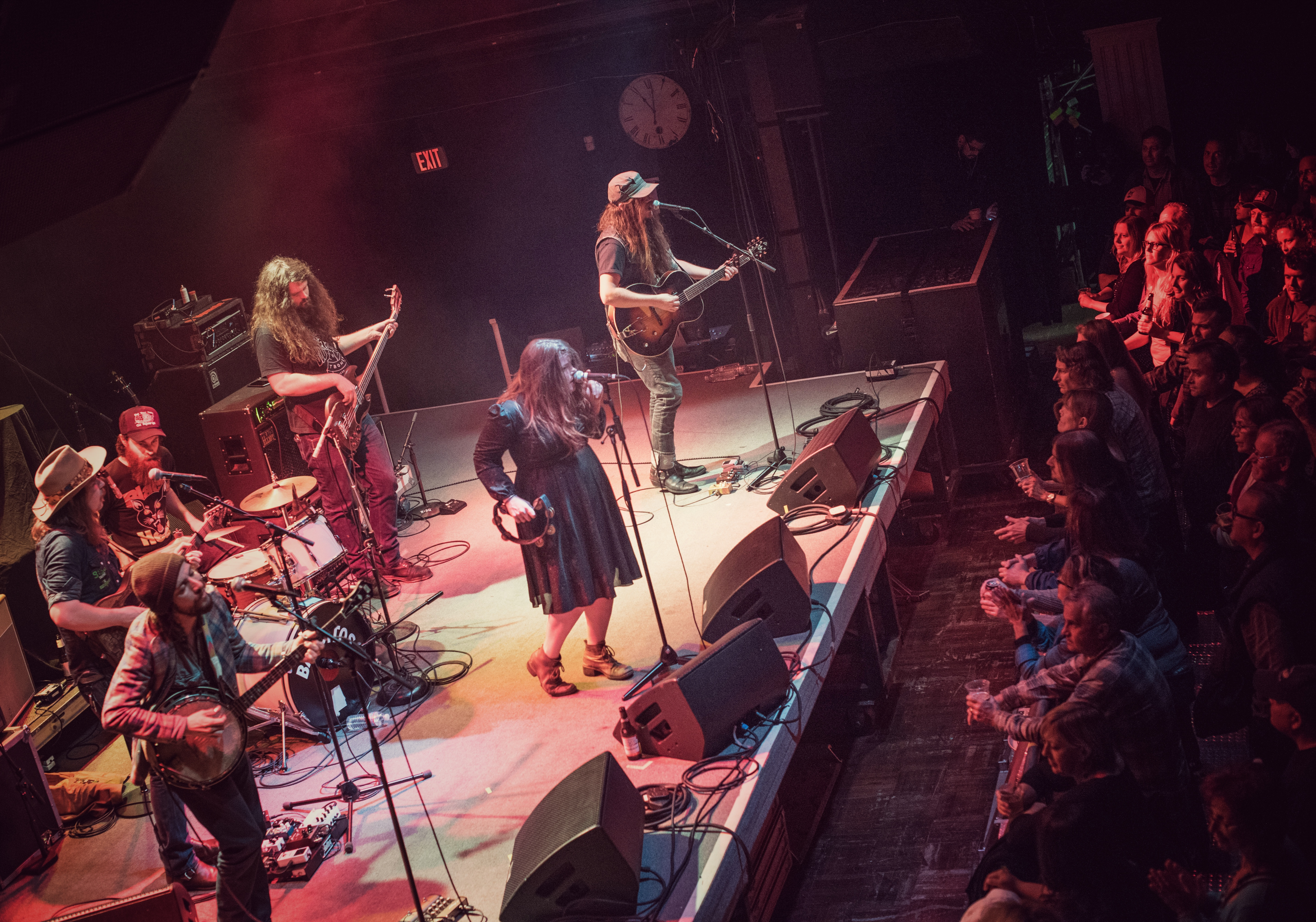
- Banditos at the 9:30 Club in Washington, DC. Fall 2015

Background information
- Origin: Birmingham, Alabama US
- Genres: Rock and roll, garage rock
- Years active: 2010–present
- Label: Bloodshot Records
- Members: Timothy Steven Corey Parsons; Stephen Alan Pierce II; Mary Beth Richardson; Randy Taylor Wade; Jeffery Daniel Vines; Jeffery David Salter
- Website: banditosband.com

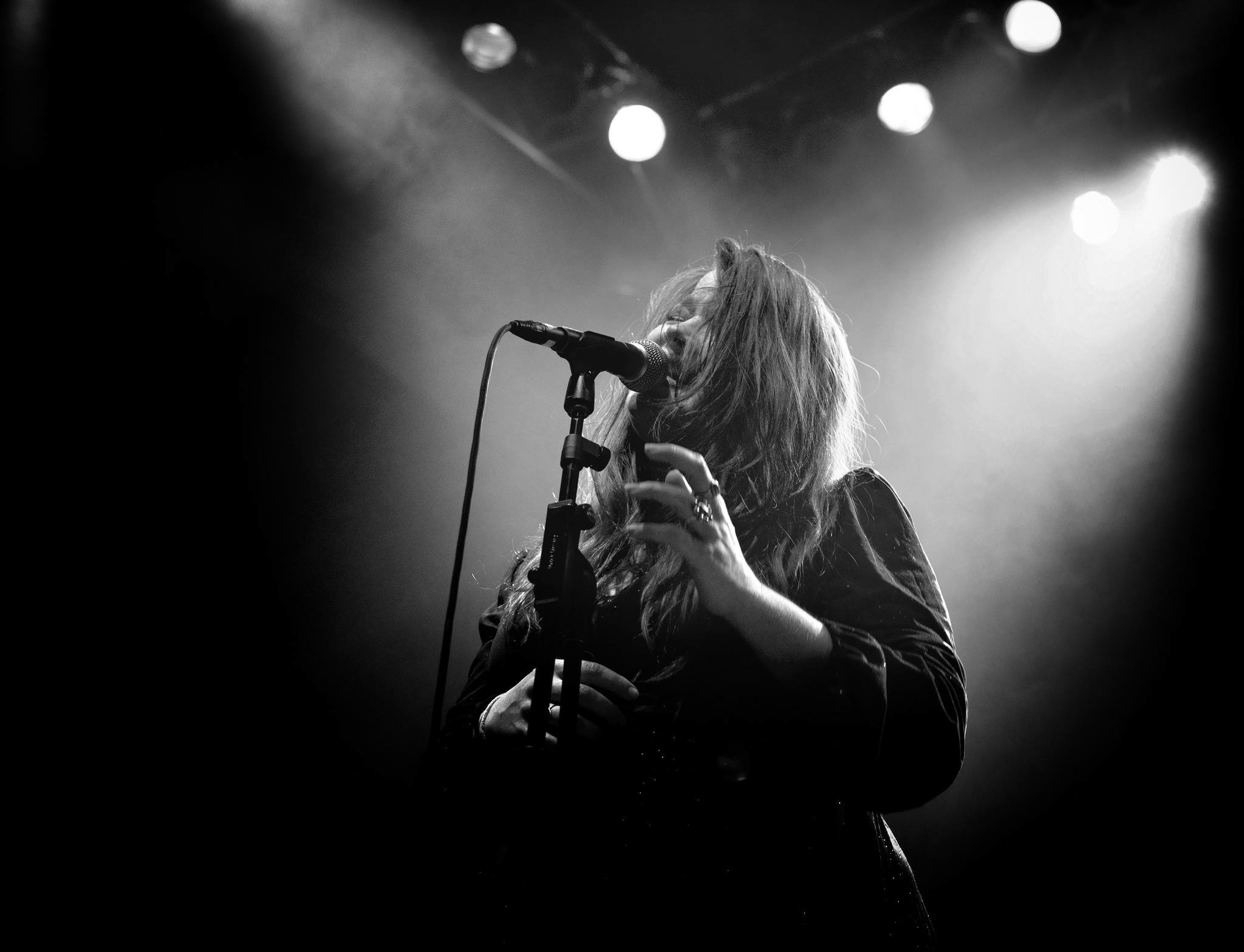
Mary Beth Richardson

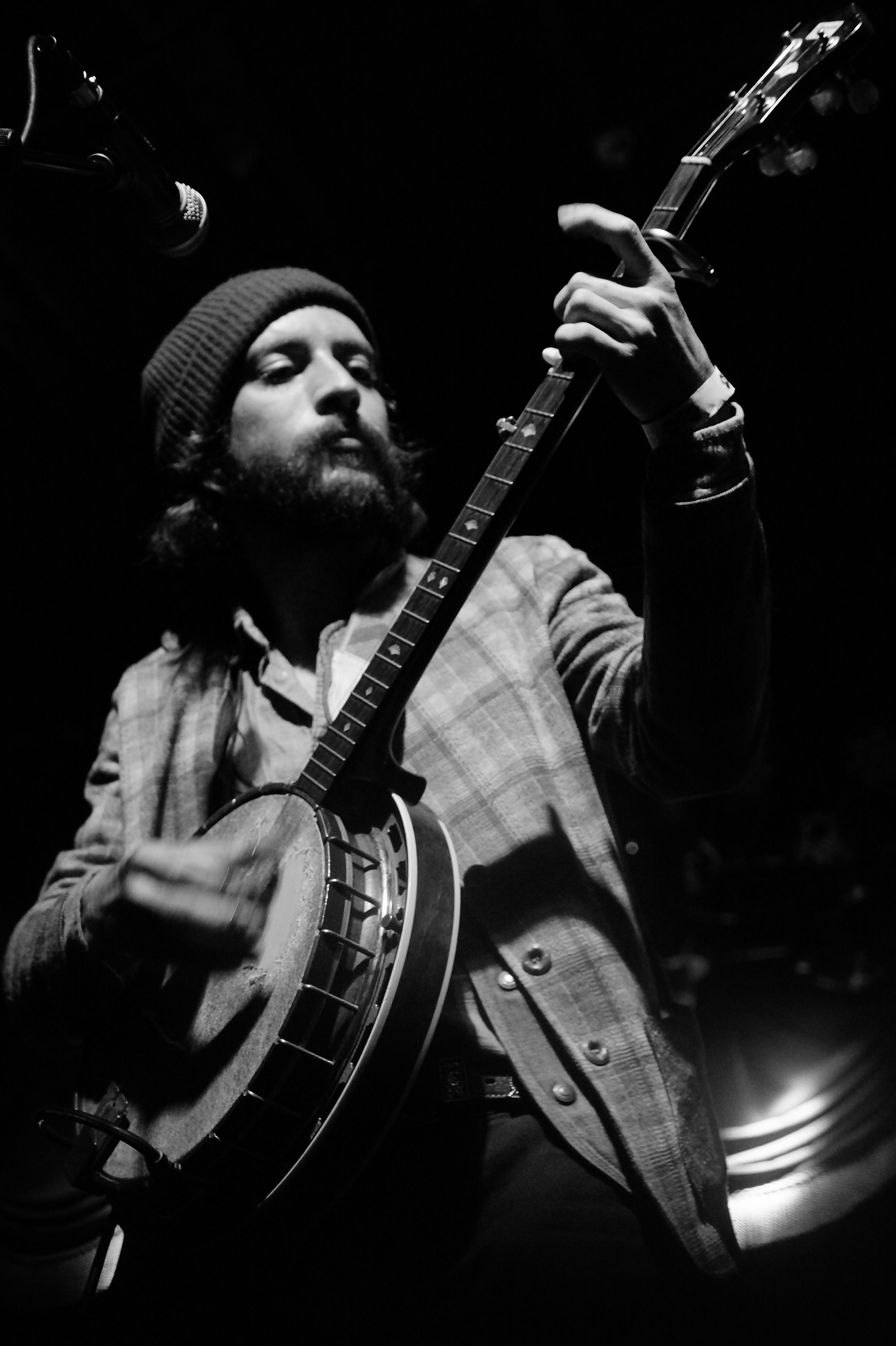
Stephen Pierce

Banditos is an American six-piece rock and roll band led by singers Corey Parsons, Stephen Pierce, and Mary Beth Richardson with honky tonk, country, soul and garage rock influences. The band originally hails from Birmingham, Alabama, but is currently based in Nashville, Tennessee. Formed in 2010, Banditos toured the United States for four years before they signed to Bloodshot Records.

== History ==
Banditos began in 2010 when singer/guitarist Corey Parsons and singer/banjo player Stephen Pierce starting playing acoustic music in Birmingham's local indie/rock scene. They busked around the city and were eventually invited to play a show at their favorite local saloon. They added Mary Beth Richardson on vocals and percussion, Randy Wade on drums, Danny Vines on bass, and Jeffery Salter playing lead guitar. Pierce's non-traditional banjo playing throughout their music adds to the honky-tonk and garage elements of their sound. Lead guitarist Salter, who grew up with Parsons and Vines in Hueytown, Alabama, is trained in jazz and classical guitar from University of Alabama at Birmingham and works as a luthier, building custom guitars as part of his company, Pyrose Wood Works. The band's name comes from the idea of a band of friends getting together. The band's name is not associated with the Bandidos Motorcycle Club, although Bandidos members have come to see the band play a few times.

From their early days in Birmingham, the band lived together in the Crestwood neighborhood, writing songs together, and touring heavily. While on tour, the group found themselves constantly playing shows in Nashville, so after about two years in Birmingham, they decided to relocate to East Nashville. Over the next three years Banditos played over 600 shows, and in 2014, the group played South by Southwest, where they caught the eye of Bloodshot Records, and were signed to the label soon after. Marah Eakin of The A.V. Club says "The perfect soundtrack to a rowdy hang, the band blends traditional instruments like banjo and pedal steel with modern sensibilities, resulting in something that’s both uniquely now and uniquely American. In March 2015, Banditos played at Rachael Ray's 8th annual Feedback in Austin Banditos have played Scandinavia, winning a place in the competitive Sweden Rock Festival in Sölvesborg.

=== Banditos (2015) ===
On May 12, 2015, Banditos debuted their self-titled album that was produced by Andrija Tokic, whose work includes fellow southern rock artists Alabama Shakes and Hurray for the Riff Raff. The record was recorded almost all live, and was recorded at Tokic's the Bomb Shelter studio in Nashville. The initial record, made around 2013, was not officially released, was just sold on tour as merchandise, so the Banditos went back into the studio to rework much of the road-tested material, adding a bunch of new songs, which resulted in the official 2015 Bloodshot release.

After the album was released, the band was featured in Taco Bell's Feed the Beat campaign, a program that helps feed touring musicians and allows fans to discover new bands. Banditos debuted their music video for "The Breeze" via Rolling Stone's website in the summer of 2015. Rolling Stone writer Andrew Leahey said the record is "Equal parts alt-country twang and garage rock bang, the album wears its influences proudly, recalling everything from ZZ Top's greasy boogie to the Alabama Shakes' coed soul." NPR listed the song,"Waitin'," on its Favorite Songs of 2015.

Banditos are working on their second album follow-up, which will incorporate a psychedelic feel. It will be released in 2016.

The band released a third album, Right On, in May 2022. Its lead single is "Here Tonight".

== Discography ==
=== Albums ===
- 2013: The Breeze (self released, tour only record)
- 2015: Banditos (Bloodshot Records)
- 2017: Visionland (Bloodshot Records)
- 2022: “On My Way” single (Egghunt Records)
- 2022: “Right On” (Egghunt Records)

=== Singles ===
- 2015: "Cry Baby Cry" (Bloodshot Records)
