= The Brothers Comatose =

American bluegrass band

- Origin: San Francisco, United States
- Genres: Bluegrass, folk-rock
- Years active: 2009–present
- Members: Ben Morrison (vocals, guitar); Alex Morrison (vocals, banjo, guitar); Addie Levy (vocals, mandolin); Steve Height (bass); Philip Brezina (violin)
- Website: http://www.thebrotherscomatose.com/

The Brothers Comatose is a five-piece bluegrass band based out of San Francisco, California. The band consists of brothers Ben and Alex Morrison, who play guitar and banjo, respectively, along with Steve Height on the bass, Philip Brezina with the violin, and Addie Levy on the mandolin.

== History ==
Born in Petaluma, California, frontman Ben Morrison along with his brother, Alex Morrison began playing guitar and singing songs at age 12, taking a liking to Rock and Roll. The brothers grew up around music, hosting music parties.

“The Morrison house was a gathering place for local musicians – everyone would bring an instrument, call out tunes, call out changes, and just play for hours” says former Brothers Comatose bassist, Giovanni Benedetti

The band began with the two brothers doing arrangements of songs by bands such as Led Zeppelin, the Rolling Stones, and Creedence Clearwater Revival.

Since then, the group has released numerous albums, including: Songs From The Stoop (2010), Respect the Van (2012), City Painted Gold (2016), Ink, Dust and Luck (2018), Turning Up the Ground (2022) and Golden Grass (2025). They have played and headlined bluegrass festivals like Hardly Strictly Bluegrass, High Sierra Music Festival, Outside Lands Music and Arts Festival, and Kate Wolf Music Festival. The Brothers Comatose have also led extended tours with The Devil Makes Three, Yonder Mountain String Band and Lake Street Dive.

== Musical style and influences ==
The Brothers Comatose's style is often described as a high-energy, foot-stompin', "rowdy" folk-rock string band. The Acoustic Guitar Magazine describes their music as an "upbeat brand of Americana with lots of twang, a dash of wit, and a splash of surrealism." At many of their shows, the Brothers Comatose would encourage crowd participation, including clapping, sing-along, and passing around chopsticks to use as percussion instruments. The band redefines bluegrass music as a blend of contemporary rock and traditional bluegrass. Glide Magazine claims that the Brothers Comatose "bows both to tradition and contemporary designs. Theirs is a rugged, rustic sound that’s implied in each of these eleven songs, one that allows their old timey string band approach to ring with an air of authenticity."

Both the Morrison brothers' parents were musicians. They were inspired mostly by their mother, who was in a folk band, harmonizing with other singers in their living room. They have re-created that in their string band with three-part harmonies, with Ben Morrison's warm, gritty baritone usually taking the lead.

== Discography ==
=== Albums ===
| Year | Title | Label |
|---|---|---|
| 2010 | Songs from the Stoop | Swamp Jam Records |
| 2012 | Respect the Van | Swamp Jam Records |
| 2016 | City Painted Gold | Swamp Jam Records |
| 2018 | Ink, Dust, and Luck | AntiFragile Music |
| 2022 | Turning Up the Ground | Swamp Jam Records |
| 2023 | Ear Snacks | Swamp Jam Records |
| 2025 | Golden Grass | Swamp Jam Records |

=== EPs ===
| Year | Title | Label |
|---|---|---|
| 2012 | The Covers EP | Swamp Jam Records |
| 2016 | The Metal EP | Swamp Jam Records |
| 2016 | The Covers EP: Vol. 2 | Swamp Jam Records |
| 2017 | The Punk EP | Swamp Jam Records |

=== Singles ===
| Year | Title | Label |
|---|---|---|
| 2017 | "Don't Make Me Get Up And Go" | Swamp Jam Records |
| 2018 | "Sugar Please (feat. Nicki Bluhm)" | AntiFragile Music |
| 2020 | "Enjoy the Silence" | Swamp Jam Records |
| 2020 | "Strangers" | Swamp Jam Records |
| 2020 | "No Quarter (SongAid)" | SongAid |
| 2021 | "Steel Driver" | Swamp Jam Records |
| 2021 | "Soft and Blue" | Swamp Jam Records |
| 2021 | "Too Many Places" | Swamp Jam Records |
| 2021 | "Gone Gone Gone" | Swamp Jam Records |
| 2021 | "Are You Waiting?" | Swamp Jam Records |
| 2022 | "Hole in my Pocket" | Swamp Jam Records |
| 2022 | "18 Years" | Swamp Jam Records |
| 2022 | "When It All Falls Apart" | Swamp Jam Records |
| 2022 | "Harvest Moon (feat. AJ Lee) | Swamp Jam Records |
| 2023 | "The IPA Song (feat. Ronnie McCoury) | Swamp Jam Records |
| 2024 | "Run Boy Run" | Swamp Jam Records |
| 2024 | "Running On Back To You" | Swamp Jam Records |
| 2024 | "These Days" | Swamp Jam Records |

=== Live Albums ===
| Year | Title | Label |
|---|---|---|
| 2023 | Kickin' Up the Dust (Live at Moe's Alley) | Swamp Jam Records |
