= Susan Greenbaum =

American professor

Susan D. Greenbaum
- Education: University of Kansas
- Occupations: Anthropologist, professor
- Employer: University of Florida
- Known for: Research on Afro-Cubans in Tampa, studies on poverty
- Notable work: More Than Black: Afro-Cubans in Tampa, Blaming the Poor
- Title: Emerita Professor of Anthropology

Susan D. Greenbaum is an emerita professor of Anthropology at the University of Florida.

She received her B.A., M.A., and Ph.D degrees from the University of Kansas. The University of Kansas has a collection of her papers.

She wrote a book about Afro-Cubans in Tampa. She wrote a book titled Blaming the Poor about Daniel Patrick Moynihan's report "Negro Family" and its long term affects. She gave an oral history interview in 2001.

== Writings ==
- The Afro-American Community in Kansas City, Kansas
- Afro-Cubans in Ybor City; A centennial history
- More than Black: Afro-Cubans in Tampa
- Blaming the Poor; The Long Shadow of the Moynihan Report on Cruel Images About Poverty Rutgers University Press (2015)
