= Egi Station =

Railway station in Maebashi, Gunma Prefecture, Japan

Egi Station 江木駅
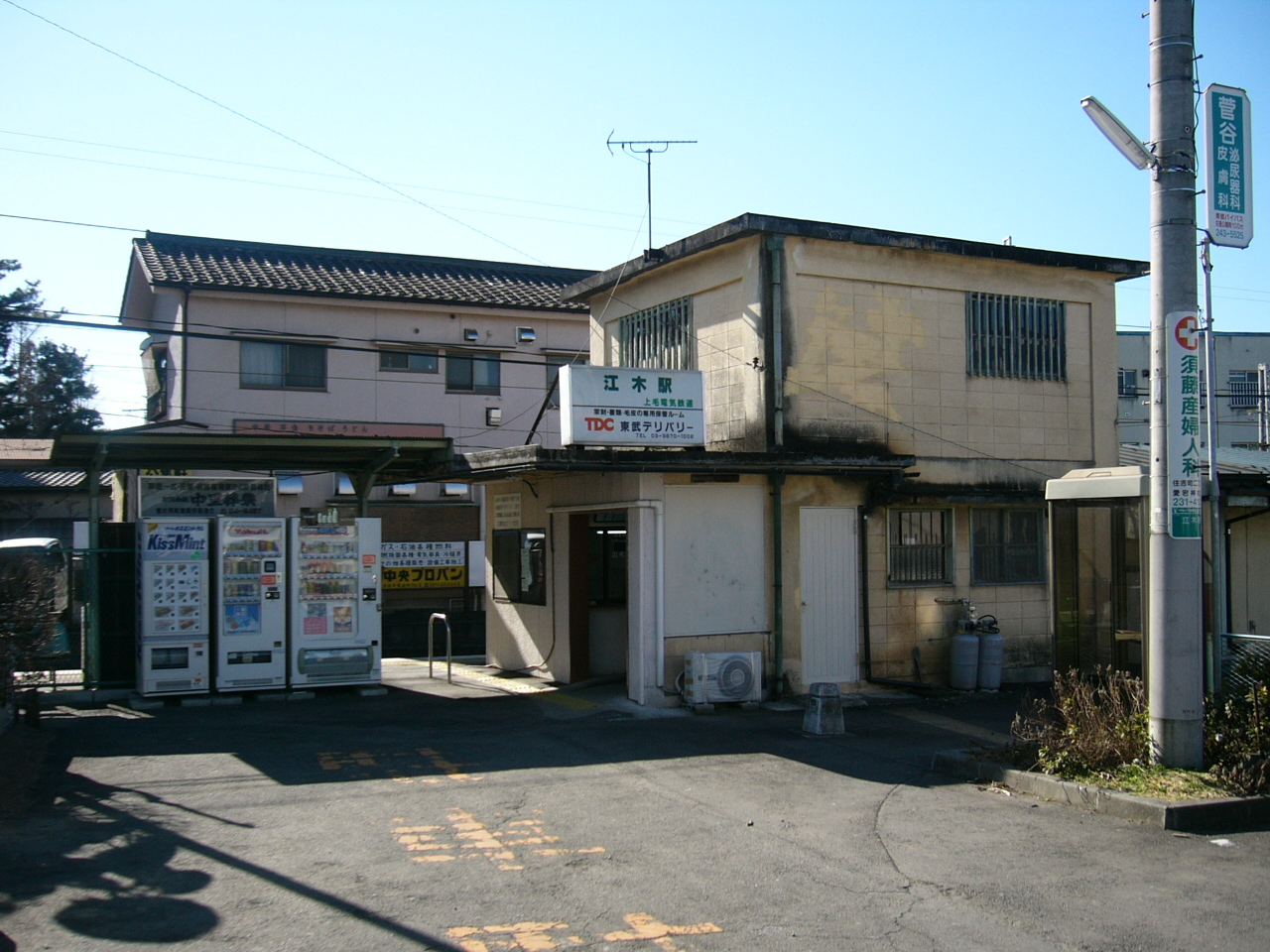
- Egi Station in February 2004

General information
- Location: Egimachi 1223-4, Maebashi-shi, Gunma-ken 371-0002; Japan
- Coordinates: 36.4070°N 139.1332°E
- Operator: Jōmō Electric Railway Company
- Line: ■ Jōmō Line
- Distance: 6.2 km from Chūō-Maebashi
- Platforms: 1 side platform

History
- Opened: November 10, 1928

Passengers
- FY2015: 277

Services
Preceding station	Jōmō Electric Railway	Following station
Shinzō-Kekkan Center towards Chūō-Maebashi	Jōmō Line	Ōgo towards Nishi-Kiryū
Location
- Location within Gunma Prefecture Location within Japan

Egi Station (江木駅, Egi-eki) is a passenger railway station in the city of Maebashi, Gunma Prefecture, Japan, operated by the private railway operator Jōmō Electric Railway Company.

== Lines ==
Egi Station is a station on the Jōmō Line, and is located 6.2 kilometers from the terminus of the line at Chūō-Maebashi.

== Station layout ==
The station consists of a single side platform serving traffic in both directions.

== History ==
Egi Station was opened on November 10, 1928.

== Surrounding area ==
- Maebashi Egi Post Office

== See also ==
- List of railway stations in Japan
