= HogMaw =

American band

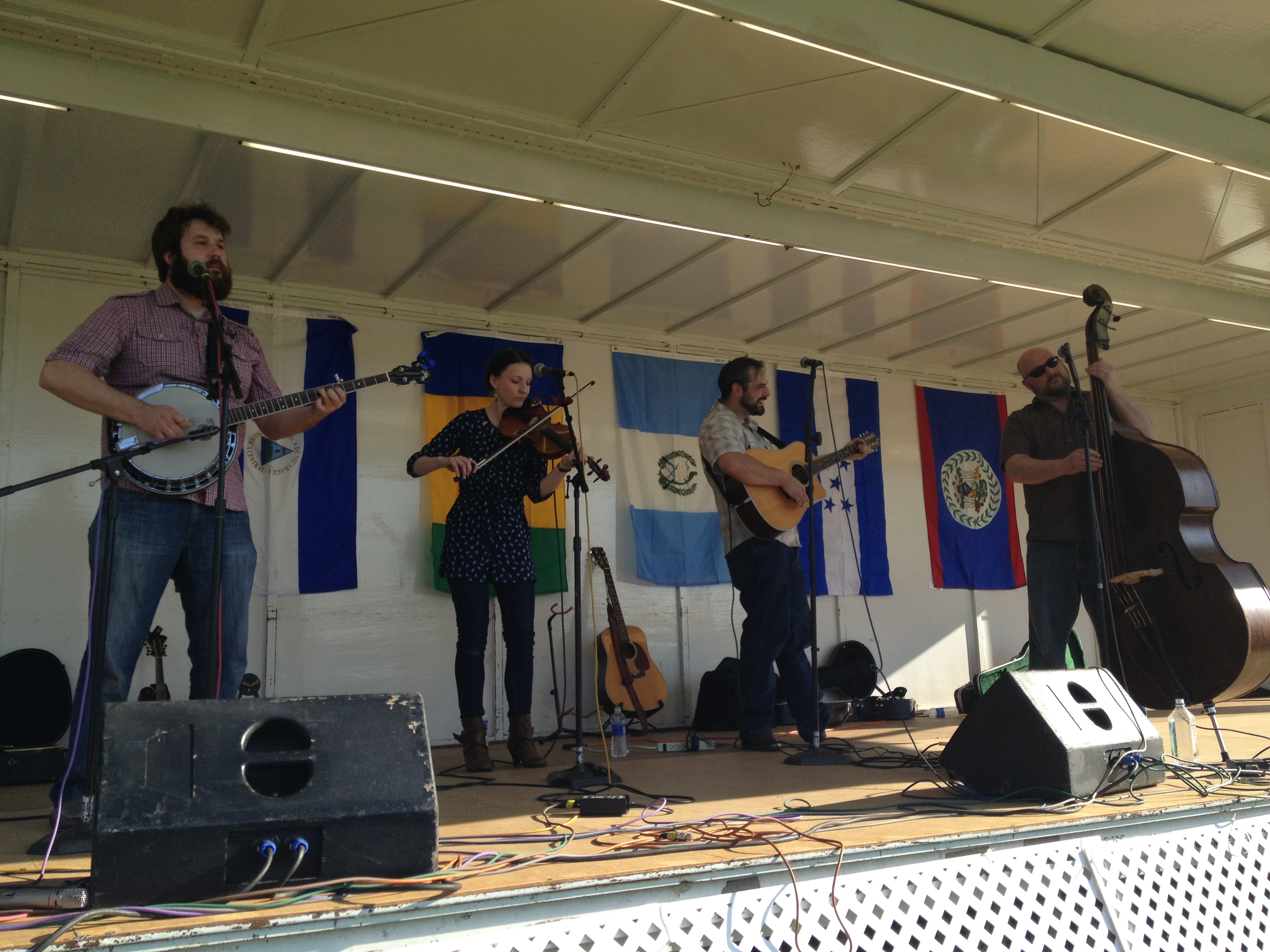
- HogMaw performing at the New Jersey Folk Festival

Background information
- Origin: York, Pennsylvania, United States
- Genres: Folk; Bluegrass; Progressive bluegrass
- Years active: 2008–present
- Label: unsigned
- Members: Matt Baldwin; Colin Reeves; Ryann Lynch; Johnny Calimari
- Past members: Garry Slick
- Website: Official website

HogMaw is an American band from York, Pennsylvania, United States. The band's music has been described as a combination of bluegrass, folk, funk, and heavy metal called "thundergrass".

== History ==
HogMaw formed in 2008 when fiddler Ryann Lynch met guitarist Matt Baldwin and banjo and mandolin player Colin Reeves at a folk music festival in rural New Jersey. HogMaw has appeared as a featured group on Philadelphia-area public radio station WXPN's Folk Show. In June 2011, the band entered a band competition sponsored by the Philadelphia Folksong Society, which invited campground musicians from its annual music festival to compete for a chance to perform on stage. HogMaw was one of two bands who won, and later that August they opened on the main stage of the annual 50th Philadelphia Folk Festival, one of the largest in North America.

Hogmaw performed at the Bucks County Bluegrass Festival in 2011.

HogMaw is also featured in the independent film At Fest. The music and members of HogMaw are included in the 2013 trailer for the feature-length documentary.

HogMaw released its first album, Wake, in July 2012. To raise money for the project, they used crowdfunding website Kickstarter ultimately doubling their goal and raising $2,400 from supporters of the band. The album received a positive review at Tristate. The group entered the studio in early 2013 and recorded a second album, Ideal Proof with producer Dom Flemons.

In 2014, Hogmaw performed at the Little Buffalo Festival and the Spring Pickin' Bluegrass Festival in Pennsylvania. In 2015 they performed at the Camp Jam in the Pines Music Festival in New Jersey.

== Members ==
- Matt Baldwin - guitar, vocals
- Colin Reeves - mandolin, banjo, vocals
- Ryann Lynch - fiddle, vocals
- Johnny Calimari - upright bass

== Discography ==
- Wake (2012)
- Ideal Proof (2013)
