= Shadowgrass =

American progressive bluegrass band

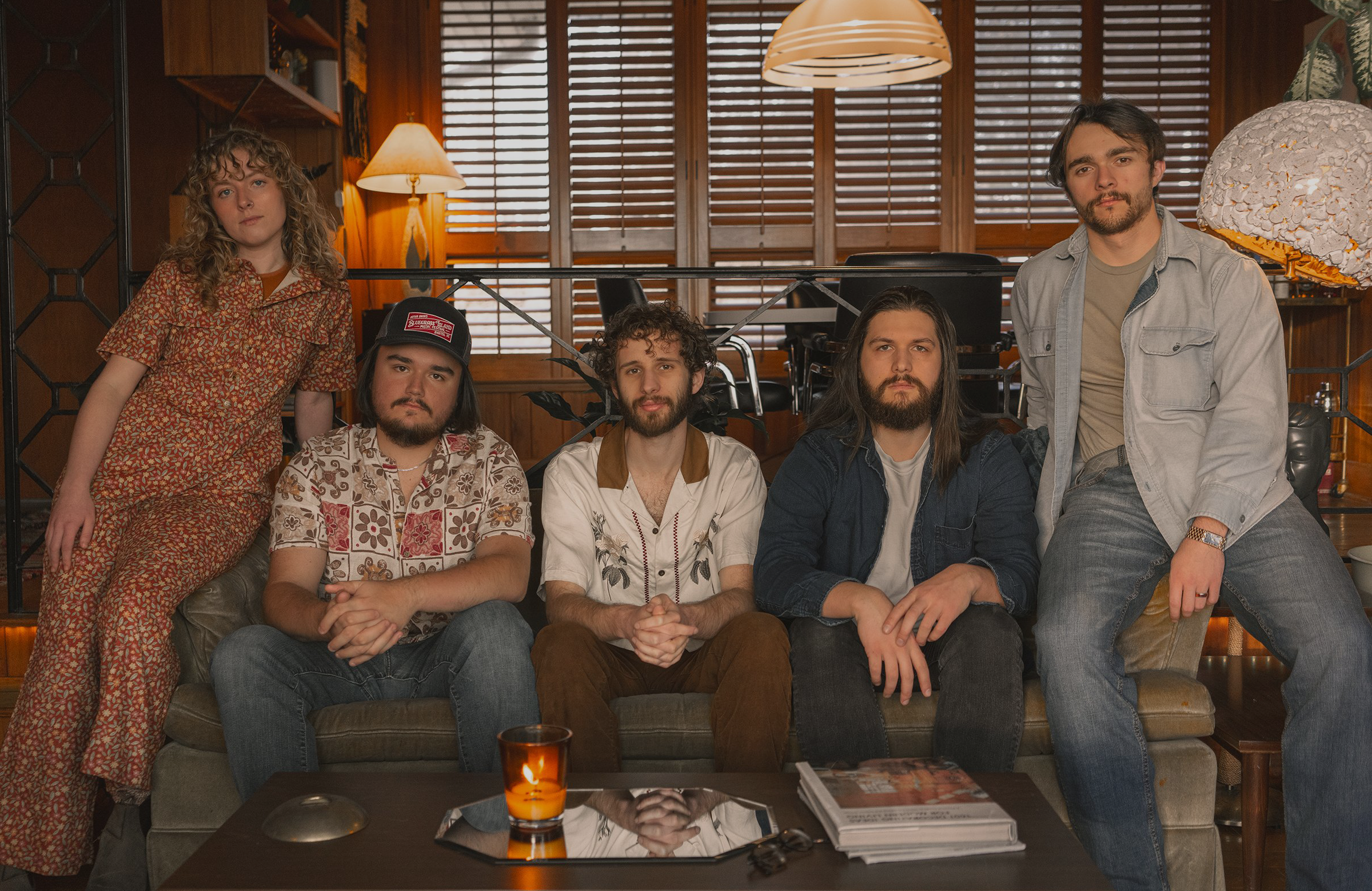

Background information
- Origin: Blue Ridge Mountains, Virginia/North Carolina, U.S.
- Genres: Progressive bluegrass
- Years active: 2014–present
- Members: Clay Russell – banjo; Luke Morris – mandolin, lead vocals; Kyser George – guitar; Madison Morris – fiddle, vocals; Evan Campfield – upright bass
- Website: Official website

Shadowgrass is an American progressive bluegrass band formed in 2014 in the Blue Ridge Mountains region of Virginia and North Carolina. Composed of childhood friends who began playing together as preteens, Shadowgrass has released two studio albums and toured across the United States.

== History ==
Shadowgrass was founded in 2014 by banjoist Clay Russell, mandolinist Luke Morris, and guitarist Kyser George (then aged 9–14) during a jam session at the Grayson County Fiddlers Convention in Elk Creek, Virginia. They changed band names several times before settling on Shadowgrass. They opened for Billy Strings at the Rives Theatre in 2017.

By 2019 the band had been featured on the public radio program American Routes as one of the brightest young acts in bluegrass. The lineup later expanded to include fiddler Madison Morris and bassist Evan Campfield. Their self-titled debut album was released in 2022, followed by All That Will in 2024.

== Members ==
- Clay Russell – banjo
- Luke Morris – mandolin, lead vocals
- Kyser George – guitar
- Madison Morris – fiddle, vocals
- Evan Campfield – upright bass

== Awards and nominations ==
Guitarist Kyser George has received the following individual awards for his flatpicking and instrumental work:

- 2025: IBMA Momentum Award – Instrumentalist of the Year (shared with Rainy Miatke)
- 2021: North Carolina State Flatpicking Guitar Championship (1st place)

The band was selected as the official IBMA Youth Council Showcase band in 2016.

== Discography ==
=== Studio albums ===
- Shadowgrass (2022)
- All That Will (2024)

=== Singles ===
- "Mr. Charlie" (2022)
- "Rich Girl" (2022)
- "Pleasantly Aimless" (2024)
- "Uncertain Times" (2024)
