= Bristol Rhythm & Roots Reunion =

- Promotional poster for the 2009 Bristol Rhythm & Roots Reunion Festival
- Genre: americana, folk, blues-rock, folk rock, country, and bluegrass.
- Locations: USA: Bristol, Virginia; Bristol, Tennessee
- Years active: 2001-Present
- Website: Bristol Rhythm & Roots Reunion

Bristol Rhythm and Roots Reunion a non-profit organization which hosts an annual 3-day Americana music festival in the twin cities of Bristol, Virginia and Bristol, Tennessee.

Celebrating Bristol's heritage as the "Birthplace of Country Music" (a designation recognizing the early Jimmie Rogers and Carter Family recordings made there in the 1920s collectively known as the Bristol Sessions), Rhythm & Roots has hosted musicians such as Ralph Stanley, Sam Bush, Doc Watson, The Avett Brothers, John Cowan, Langhorne Slim, and Del McCoury. Since the first festival in 2001, Rhythm and Roots has grown to include 4 main stages (3 of which are outdoors), a dance tent, and 12 smaller stages inside the various shops, restaurants, and bars in the 4-block festival area. In 2008, the festival hosted over 50 bands and received an audience of over 30,000 people from across the United States. In 2009, the September festival received the award from the Virginia Association of Convention and Visitors Bureaus for "Best Destination Event of 2009." Besides the annual festival, this reunion also hosts events such as the monthly Border Bash concert series and the weekly Great On State concert series during the summer.

2009 headliners included Justin Townes Earle, Dr. Dog, Patty Loveless, John Cowan, Webb Wilder, and Dan Tyminski. 2010 marked the 10th anniversary of the festival.

In 2010, Bristol Rhythm & Roots' 10th reunion achieved its largest audience to date with a record number of 45,000 people in attendance.

What would've been the 20th reunion in 2020 saw the first time that it went on hiatus.
