= Rose's Pawn Shop =

American musical group

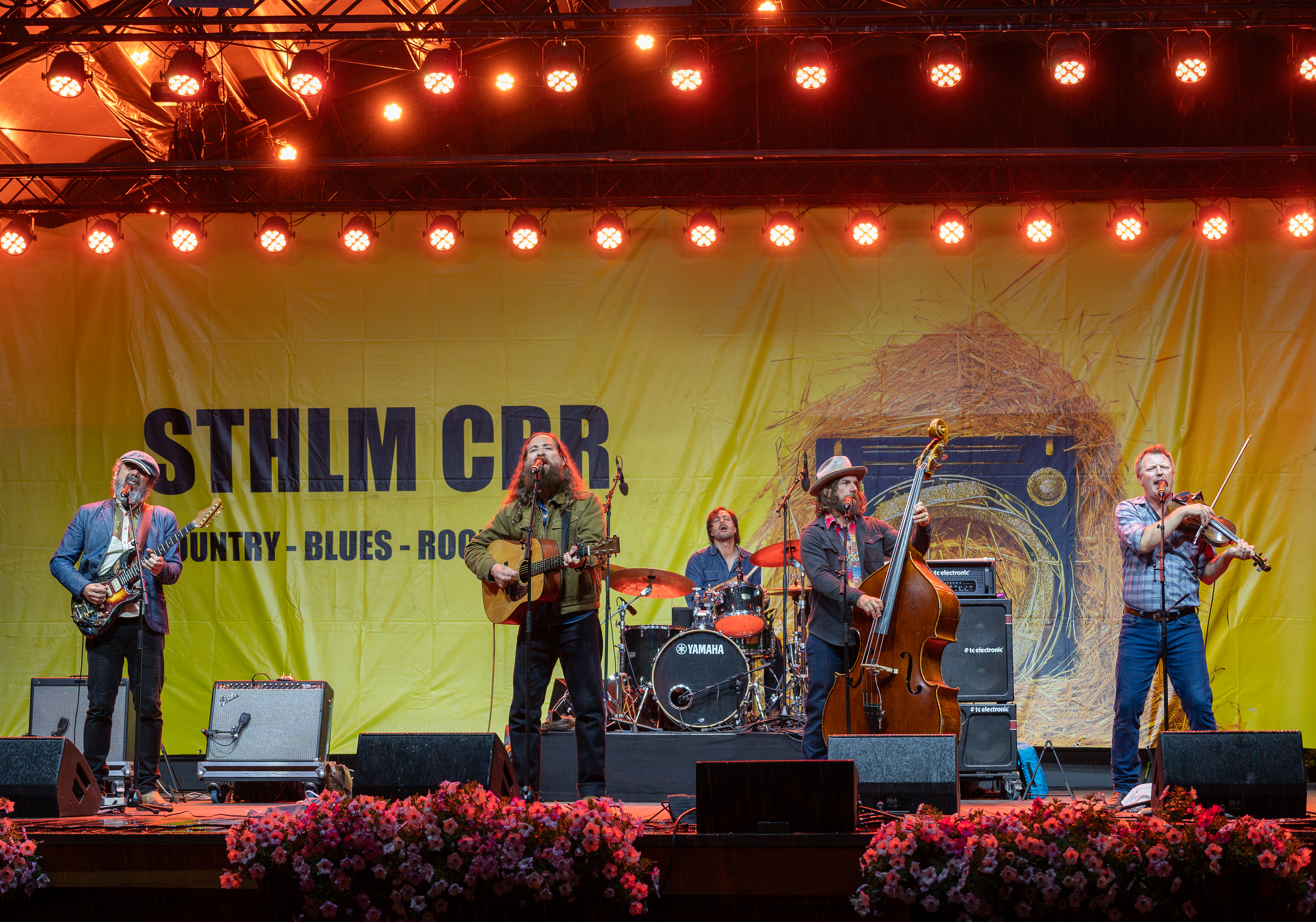
Rose's Pawn Shop during the CBR (Country, Blues, Rock) event in Kungsträdgården in Stockholm in July 2026.

Rose's Pawn Shop is an Americana, rock, folk and bluegrass band from Los Angeles, California. Their debut album, The Arsonist, was released in May 2006. The band tours several times each year throughout the United States.

Rose's Pawn Shop released their 4th album "Punch-Drunk Life" on February 24, 2023 on KZZ Music.

Rose's Pawn Shop released their 5th album "American Seams" on February 27, 2026 on Copaco Records/Blue Elan Records.

== Formation ==
Formed in August 2005, Rose's Pawn Shop is a five-piece band consisting of:

- Paul Givant - lead vocals, guitar and banjo
- Stephen Andrews - Upright and Electric bass
- Zachary Ross - Electric guitar
- Deacon Marrquin - drums
- Jesse Olema - fiddle

Former members:

- Sebastian St. John - fiddle, mandolin, accordion, Bouzouki, Greek lyra and vocals
- Bill Clark - banjo, pedal steel, guitar and vocals
- Derek Asuan-O'Brien - upright and gut bucket basses
- Derek Swenson - drums and vocals
- Dave Weinstein - original drummer, left the band to pursue a modeling career
- Ulf Geist - drums
- Christian Hogan - drums
- Tim Weed - fiddle, mandolin and vocals
- John Kraus - banjo, electric guitar and vocals
- Matt Lesser - drums

They have also recorded and performed with: "Soda"- banjo, guitars and vocals, Jimmy Stelling of The Hackensaw Boys, Wayne Hancock, Junior Brown, Flogging Molly, Th' Legendary Shack Shakers, The Scotch Greens, Jack White and The Raconteurs, Grace Potter & The Nocturnals, Ghostland Observatory, Blues Traveler, DeVotchka, Old Crow Medicine Show, Levon Helm, Blue Rodeo, Conor Oberst and the Mystic River Band, Railroad Earth, The Sadies, and The Duhks, and many others.

== Awards ==
In 2006, Rose's Pawn Shop was awarded the 2006 Best Band in the West title in the Billboard Magazine/Disc Makers Independent Music World Series. They were also selected as Amoeba Records homegrown artist of the month for June 2006. Following these awards Rose's Pawn Shop embarked on a three-month cross-country tour.

== Press highlights ==
Rolling Stone premiered “What Were You Waiting For” music video in September 2014. American Songwriter premiered “What Were You Waiting For” in July 2014.

== Discography ==
Album:	The Arsonist
Label:	Self-released
Released:	May 23, 2006

Track listing:
1. "The Arsonist"
2. "Funeral Pyre"
3. "Deep Red Clay"
4. "One-Man Show"
5. "Lone Rider"
6. "Long Way to Fall"
7. "Reckoning"
8. "My Old Valentine"
9. "Down the Line"
10. "Blood Running River"

Album:	Dancing On The Gallows
Label:	Self-released
Released:	June 8, 2010

Track listing:
1. "Dancing on the Gallows"
2. "Danger Behind the Wheel"
3. "The Well"
4. "Pine Box"
5. "Ball of Flames"
6. "Patiently"
7. "The Bed in Which You Lie"
8. "Straw Man"
9. "Strangers"
10. "One Last Glass of Whiskey"
11. "The Garden"
12. "Debt Collector"

Album:	Gravity Well
Label:	inGrooves
Released:	September 9, 2014

Track listing:
1. "What Were You Waiting For"
2. "Staring At The Door"
3. "Go Get Gone"
4. "Stay All Night"
5. "Country Blues"
6. "Town Crier"
7. "On the Brink"
8. "Mountains"
9. "Traveler"
10. "After This Fall"
11. "Gravity Well"
12. "Don't Let Me Down"

Album:	Punch-Drunk Life
Label:	KZZ Music
Released:	February 24, 2023

Track listing:
1. "Old Time Pugilist"
2. "Ghost Town"
3. "Gratitude"
4. "Better Now"
5. "Fugitive"
6. "Miss Tennessee"
7. "Boomerang"
8. "The Lonely One"
9. "High Lonsesome"
10. "Satellite"
11. "Halfway Down The Road"
12. "Life By Misadventure"

Album:	American Seams
Label:	Copaco Records/Blue Elan Records
Released:	February 27, 2026

Track listing:
1. "American Seams"
2. "Where The Horizon Has a Light"
3. "Darken My Door"
4. "The Summer's Over"
5. "What If We Run"
6. "Escape Artist"
7. "Going Out In The Wild"
8. "Fare Thee Well"
9. "Ain't No Way"
10. "Autumn Eyes"
