= Eggy =

Eggy or Eggie may refer to:

== Nicknames ==
- Nathan Eglington (born 1980), Australian field hockey player
- Eugenia Apostol (born 1925), Filipino publisher who played pivotal roles in the peaceful overthrow of Philippine presidents Ferdinand Marcos and Joseph Estrada
- Eggie Dallard, American baseball player

== Fictional characters ==
- a character in the novel Laughing Gas by P. G. Wodehouse
- a character from the fourth season of Battle for Dream Island, an animated web series
- a character in the BBC TV series Count Arthur Strong
- a character in the video game Eggy Party
- a recurring character in the animated TV series The Penguins of Madagascar

== Other uses ==
- Eggy the Ram, mascot of the Ryerson Rams, the athletic teams of Ryerson University in Toronto, Ontario, Canada
- the 1970 winner of the Gardenia Stakes (Garden State Park) American Thoroughbred horse race
- a Gogo's Crazy Bones collectible figurine
- Eggie (brand), a brand of clothing

== See also ==
- Gary "Eggsy" Unwin, main character of the Kingsman franchise
- Eggsy, a member of the Welsh comedic rap music group Goldie Lookin Chain
