= Blues and Lasers =

American Delta blues rock band

- Origin: Burlington, Vermont; United States
- Genres: Delta blues, blues rock
- Years active: 2007—present
- Members: Scott Tournet; Benny Yurco; Matt Burr; John Rogone; Steve Sharon
- Past members: Bryan Dondero
- Website: www.bluesandlasers.com

Blues and Lasers is an American Delta blues rock band from Burlington, Vermont.

== Career ==
Blues and Lasers formed in 2007 in Burlington, Vermont out of The Scott Tournet Band. Scott Tournet set out to create another band with a Delta blues and classic rock sound. Tournet (guitar and vocals), who is also the guitarist for Grace Potter and the Nocturnals, added fellow Nocturnals Matt Burr (drums) and Bryan Dondero (bass) along with college friend Steve Sharon (drums) to form the band. The addition of Benny Yurco (guitar and vocals) finished out the lineup (Yurco later joined Grace Potter and the Nocturnals as well). In 2009 Bryan Dondero left the band and was replaced with John Rogone. The name Blues and Lasers came from a daylong jam session that sounded like blues with lasers.

In 2008 Blues and Lasers released a self-titled EP. Blues and Lasers was recorded at Club Metronome in Burlington over a two-day period. After recording, the band went to the studio to mix the album. It resulted in a 5-song, 40 minute “monster.” Reviews stated that the album “joyously resurrects the blues-based rock and roll that populated AOR radio in the Seventies. The songs have a juju swagger; birthed from tortured blues singers who had haunted souls and bad intentions the back door men who had hell hounds on their trail.”

In 2010 Blues and Lasers released their second record, After All We’re Only Human, which was recorded at Tank Studios in Burlington. Tournet stated that the approach to recording the album was dictated by time and money. “We did two days of basic tracks last summer where we tracked all nine songs. Once we had played a couple more shows, we took the money we’d earned and went in to begin completing the tracks. We pretty much went tune by tune until it was almost complete.” After release, the record was praised as needing “no qualification and finds few equals.” Other reviews said that “By having an ear attuned to the greats of the past, B&L gloriously usher classic rock and roll into the next decade. After All We’re Only Human lets the world know that the art of creating an album hasn’t been lost in the age of the 99 cent download. This is the classic rock record of the year.” Another said “Blues & Lasers have the right instincts to know how to say their piece‚ vocally and instrumentally‚ then move on. So the nine cuts are over before you know it and beg to be played right over again‚ If there's anything more infectious than a pop hook‚ it's a well-crafted guitar riff and After All is full of 'em.”

Since three of the bands’ members are also in Grace Potter and the Nocturnals, a lot of what goes into Blues and Lasers has to be built around the GPN schedule, including recording and concerts. Blues and Lasers often open for Grace Potter and the Nocturnals. During live shows they perform with two lead guitarists and two drummers.

== Musical style ==
The sound of Blues and Lasers is rooted in the past, but is still able to draw from more modern influences for a classic, but distinctive sound. According to Tournet Blues and Lasers “wanted something heavier, bluesier, and riskier, the force of Led Zeppelin, the swampy groove of the Delta blues, the guitars of the late '60's and '70's, juxtaposed with the sounds of our generation... like blips and bleeps and weird noises and feedback swirling around.” Cited influences range from Crazy Horse to Wilco to Muddy Waters.

== Discography ==
- Blues and Lasers EP (2008)
- After All We’re Only Human (2010)
