= Music of Colorado =

The American state of Colorado has many music scenes and venues, especially in the larger cities like Denver and Colorado Springs.

Colorado's orchestras include the Colorado Symphony Orchestra, Boulder Philharmonic Orchestra, and the Colorado Springs Philharmonic, among others.

Folk and traditional music in Colorado has been an integral part of the local popular culture in the last century. The Colorado Bluegrass Music Society exists to promote Coloradan bluegrass music, and publishes a magazine called Pow'r Pickin'.

Denver has a growing Emo scene.

== Colorado bands and artists ==
Local bands and musicians as well as those often associated with Colorado include:

- The Red Iron Push (Country/Rock)
- 16 Horsepower (Alternative/Country/Rock)
- 3OH!3 (Pop)
- Air Dubai (Alternative Hip-Hop)
- All (Punk)
- Allegaeon (Extreme Metal)
- Anti-Scrunti Faction (Punk)
- A Place For Owls (Indie/Emo)
- The Apples in Stereo (Indie/Pop)
- A Shoreline Dream (Rock)
- The Astronauts (Surf)
- Philip Bailey (R&B/Funk)
- Ginger Baker (Jazz)
- Big Gigantic (Instrumental Electronica)
- Big Head Todd and the Monsters (Rock/Blues)
- Bloodstrike (Metal)
- Tommy Bolin (1960s-1970s)
- Joe Bonner (Jazz)
- Breathe Carolina (Electronic Rock)
- Antonia Brico (Classical)
- Mark Brooks
- Calm (hip hop)
- Cellador (Heavy Metal)
- Cephalic Carnage (Extreme Metal)
- Cheap Perfume (Punk)
- Christie Front Drive (Post-hardcore, Indie, Emo)
- Churchill (Acoustic/Bluegrass/Folk Rock)
- The Czars (Rock/Alternative)
- Rachel Crow (Pop/R&B)
- Jack Stein (Country/Rock)
- Judy Collins (Folk)
- John Denver (Folk/Country) 4 No. 1 Billboard Hot 100 songs (d. 1997)
- Devon Again (Indie/Pop)
- DeVotchKa (Indie/Alternative)
- Dressy Bessy (Indie)
- The Drood (Electronic Rock)
- Drop Dead, Gorgeous (Rock)
- Earth, Wind & Fire (R&B)
- Elephant Revival (Folk)
- Fear Before the March of Flames (Post Hardcore/Metalcore)
- Firefall (Rock)
- Five Iron Frenzy (Ska)
- Flash Cadillac & the Continental Kids (Rock)
- Flobots (Rap-Rock)
- The Fluid (Rock)
- Stelth Ulvang (Folk Rock)
- Josephine Foster (Folk)
- The Fray (Adult Contemporary/Soft Rock). No. 1 Billboard 200 album with The Fray in 2009. Isaac Slade graduated from the University of Colorado Denver.
- Frogs Gone Fishin' (Funk)
- The Gamits (Pop/Punk)
- Miriam Gideon (composer)
- Dave Grusin (composer). 10-time Grammy award winner.
- Tom Hamilton, Aerosmith bassist (rock)
- Havok (Metal)
- Hit and Run (Bluegrass)
- Idlewhile (Indie/Americana)
- Illenium (Future Bass/Dubstep)
- India.Arie (R&B/Soul). Had a No. 1 Billboard 200 album in 2006.
- Javon Jackson (Jazz)
- Jag Panzer (Heavy Metal)
- Mike Johnson (guitarist)
- Andy Kirk (Jazz)
- Leftover Salmon (Jam)
- Willie Lewis (Rockabilly)
- The Lumineers (Folk/Alternative). Had a No. 1 Billboard 200 album, folk rock Cleopatra in 2016.
- Meese (Alternative)
- Ron Miles (Jazz)
- Glenn Miller (Jazz) his "In the Mood" became the best-selling swing instrumental (d. 1944)
- The Minders (Indie)
- Mr. J. Medeiros (Hip-Hop)
- Michael Martin Murphey (Pop/Country Western)
- The Motet (American funk, soul and jazz)
- Neutral Milk Hotel (Indie/Folk/Lo-Fi) Relocated to Denver to record On Avery Island and In the Aeroplane Over the Sea.
- OneRepublic (Pop/Rock/Alternative/Folk) Two No. 2 Hot 100 hits, including "Apologize".
- Opera Colorado (Opera)
- Paper Bird (Americana/Folk)
- Matt Pike
- Playalitical (Rap/Hip-Hop)
- The Photo Atlas (Pop/Rock)
- Roy Porter (Jazz drummer)
- Pretty Lights (Electronic)
- Primitive Man (Metal)
- Tag Team (duo) (Hip-Hop)
- The Procussions (Hip-Hop)
- Paul Quinichette (Jazz)
- Nathaniel Rateliff
- Dean Reed (Rock 'n' Roll)
- Dianne Reeves (Jazz)
- Rivulets (Indie/Singer-Songwriter)
- Roper (Pop/Punk)
- Rose Hill Drive (Rock)
- The Samples (Jam/Rock)
- SHEL (Folk/Pop)
- Single File (Pop)
- Slim Cessna's Auto Club (Alternative/Country/Rock)
- Jill Sobule (Folk)
- The String Cheese Incident (Jam)
- Sugarloaf (Rock)
- Sweet Lillies (Bluegrass)
- Dallas Taylor (drummer)
- Otis Taylor (musician)
- Sally Taylor (musician)
- Tennis (Alternative)
- Thinking Plague (Avant/Progressive)
- Tickle Me Pink (Pop)
- Time (indie hip hop)
- Vaux (Alternative, 1990s-2000s)
- Laura Veirs (Folk)
- Velvet Acid Christ (Electronic/Industrial, 1990s-2000s)
- The VSS (Post-hardcore/Experimental Rock)
- Mary Watkins (Folk and Jazz pianist)
- Paul Whiteman (Jazz bandleader, composer, violinist)
- Wendy Woo (Singer/Songwriter)
- Wovenhand (Alternative/Country/Rock)
- Yonder Mountain String Band (Bluegrass)
- Zephyr (Rock)

== List of notable Colorado music venues ==
Fort Collins

- Washington's, 132 Laporte Ave.
- The Armory, 314 East Mountain Ave.
- Aggie Theater, 204 S College Ave.

=== Boulder ===
- Fox Theatre, 1135 13th St.
- Macky Auditorium, CU-Boulder campus
- Boulder Theater, 2032 14th St.
- Chautauqua Auditorium

=== Broomfield ===
- 1stBank Center

=== Colorado Springs ===
- World Arena, 3185 Venetucci Blvd.
- Pikes Peak Center for the Performing Arts, 190 S. Cascade Ave.
- The Black Sheep, 2106 E Platte Ave
- Sunshine Studios Live, 3970 Clearview Frontage Rd.

=== Denver ===
- Fillmore Auditorium, 1510 Clarkson St.
- Ogden Theatre, 935 E. Colfax Ave.
- Ball Arena, 1000 Chopper Pl.
- Bluebird Theater, 3317 E. Colfax Ave.
- Paramount Theater, 1621 Glenarm Pl.
- Gothic Theater, 3263 S Broadway
- Cervantes, 2637 Welton St.
- Summit Music Hall, 1902 Blake St.
- Mission Ballroom

=== Greenwood Village ===
- Fiddler's Green Amphitheatre

=== Longmont ===
- Dickens Opera House

=== Loveland ===
- Budweiser Events Center

=== Morrison ===
- Red Rocks Amphitheatre has the Colorado Music Hall of Fame (which features the John Denver "Spirit" statue)

=== Bellvue ===
- Mishawaka Amphitheatre, 13714 Poudre Canyon Highway

== See also ==
- Arapaho music
- Indigenous music of North America
- Music of Denver
- State of Colorado
- Leftover Salmon: Thirty Years of Festival! (Book)
