= WinterWonderGrass =

Annual bluegrass and roots music festival in the U.S.

- Genre: bluegrass; jam music; folk; Americana
- Frequency: Annually
- Locations: Steamboat Springs, Colorado; Squaw Valley, California; Stratton, Vermont
- Years active: 2012–present
- Founders: Scott Stoughton
- Website: winterwondergrass.com

WinterWonderGrass is a multi-day bluegrass and roots music festival that takes place at a variety of ski resorts in the towns of Steamboat Springs, Colorado; Olympic Valley, California; and Manchester, Vermont. The festival incorporates multiple stages, day and evening performances, local and regional craft beer tastings, sustainable event production practices, and kids areas, with a portion of proceeds donated to local charitable organizations.

Regular performers at WinterWonderGrass include The Infamous Stringdusters, Greensky Bluegrass, Billy Strings and Elephant Revival, among others. An offshoot of the event includes WinterWonderWoman, an all-female bluegrass ensemble featuring a rotating cast of musicians from the festival lineup.

== History ==
=== Background ===
Scotty Stoughton, who grew up skiing in Vermont, eventually taking up ski racing around the state, moved to Colorado when he was 24. There he started a band, known in its current incarnation as Bonfire Dub, which performed in the Vail area for 20 years, while Stoughton also acted as a music promoter of concerts as part of his own production company Bonfire Entertainment.

In early 2013, Stoughton produced the inaugural WinterWonderGrass, which started as a bluegrass festival in the parking lot of Crazy Mountain Brewery in Edwards, Colorado. With only grassroots marketing, the two-day event dubbed WinterWonderGrass drew 1,400 people.

Headliners included The Infamous Stringdusters, Greensky Bluegrass, and Head for the Hills with additional artists including Grant Farm, MilkDrive, Drunken Hearts, State Bridge All Stars, Olora Brothers, Old Town Pickers, Magic Beans, Hardscrabble and She Said String Band. The first WinterWonderGrass also featured eight breweries who gave away free samples, an activity that became a mainstay of its festival from this year forward.

=== Early versions ===
For the next three years, Stoughton presented WinterWonderGrass at Notthingham Park in Avon, Colorado, before launching the festival at other locations utilizing the same format.

"For this festival, I wanted to get back to my roots and roots of the Colorado music scene, to take on an event to promote and produce acoustic roots music. It’s Americana, a little country, but primarily bluegrass," said Stoughton.

== New concert sites ==
=== Olympic Valley, California ===
In 2015, WinterWonderGrass premiered at the base Squaw Valley Alpine Meadows ski resort in Olympic Valley, California. The three-day festival was headlined by Trampled by Turtles, Greensky Bluegrass, The Infamous Stringdusters, Elephant Revival, Grammy Award-winning Sam Bush, Nicki Bluhm and the Gramblers, Dead Winter Carpenters, and The California Honeydrops.

A Kids Zone was established for children under 12 to attend for free.

With the Tahoe festival, WinterWonderGrass began the support of local non-profits such as the Rex Foundation, an organization founded by the Grateful Dead to promote arts, sciences and education. On site, the festival set up composting and recycling stations as part of its philosophy of sustainable living.

The next year, the Squaw Valley WinterWonderGrass expanded donations to more organizations and increased its on-site sustainability. The festival adopted a "zero waste" mentality and goal, limiting plastic bottles and providing compostable cups and recycling stations. The musical lineup included jam bands Railroad Earth and Leftover Salmon, as well as its hallmark bluegrass bands Greensky Bluegrass and Elephant Revival, and Primus's Les Claypool with his bluegrass band, Duo de Twang, all performing in heavy snowfall.

=== Steamboat Springs, Colorado ===
For the 5th annual WinterWonderGrass, the festival moved to Steamboat Springs, Colorado in early 2017. Thousands of fans from over 40 states attended the sold-out three-day music and brew event, featuring performances by Railroad Earth, Leftover Salmon, Elephant Revival, The Infamous Stringdusters, Sam Bush, Steep Canyon Rangers, Fruition and nineteen other bands.

Over $20,000 of the concerts' proceeds were donated to the charities United Way of Routt County, Yampatika, Educational Foundation of Eagle County, Partners of Routt Country and the Snowboard Outreach Society. An on-site food drive resulted in a donation of over 385 pounds of food to LiftUp of Routt County. The week prior to WinterWonderGrass, some of the participating artists performed at Casey's Pond Assisted Living Community.

WinterWonderGrass's composting, recycling and donation efforts in 2017 saved 13,321 pounds from heading to landfills.

In 2019, with temperatures below freezing, WinterWonderGrass returned to Steamboat Springs for another sell-out event. On the bill were Trampled by Turtles, Railroad Earth, The Infamous Stringdusters, Jeff Austin Band, Fruition, The California Honeydrops, The Lil Smokies, Billy Strings, The Shook Twins, Lindsay Lou, Sweet Lillies, Love Canon, River Whyless and more.

=== Manchester, Vermont ===
In 2018, WinterWonderGrass debuted at the base of Stratton Mountain in Manchester, Vermont, bringing headliners The Infamous Stringdusters, Railroad Earth and Billy Strings to the three-day event.

== 2019 to present ==
For 5th time, the 2019 festival appeared at Squaw Valley attracting over 4,000 people with regulars Greensky Bluegrass, Trampled by Turtles and Leftover Salmon, with the addition of 2019 winner of the Grammy Award for Best Bluegrass Album, The Travelin' McCourys added to the bill. Additional performers included Sam Bush, Dead Winter Carpenters, Animal Liberation Orchestra, Fruition, and Billy Strings.

The 2020 WinterWonderGrass in Steamboat Springs, Colorado had headliners Molly Tuttle, Greensky Bluegrass, and Grammy-nominated country singer-songwriter Margo Price.

There were WinterWonderGrass festivals scheduled at all the regular sites for 2020, but all except for Steamboat Springs were cancelled as a result of the global COVID-19 pandemic with its safe distancing and stay at home orders in each corresponding event state. According to Stoughton, the Tahoe-edition will be rescheduled for April 2021 with same lineup confirmed.

== Expansion ==
=== WinterWonderWomen ===
In 2018, to promote the proliferation of women in the bluegrass genre, a group made up of female members from other male-dominated bands and ladies from various road crews, evolved from WinterWonderGrass's stages. Called WinterWonderWomen, the group was led by Bridget Law of Elephant Revival, and Lindsay Lou, members of Della Mae, Pixie and The Partygrass Boys, Driftwood, Sweet Lillies, and Upstate.

WinterWonderWomen's mission is "to showcase top female musicians and to improve opportunities for women and girls through advocacy, mentorship, programming, and performance." The band debuted with three sets at Steamboat Springs that year.

=== WWG TV ===
WinterWonderGrass produced three episodes of WWG TV, which debuted on Facebook and on YouTube in 2020. The three-part series featured live footage captured during past festivals in all three locations.
