= Chemical Warfare Brigade =

Rock opera

Chemical Warfare Brigade is a rock opera created by Marc Brownstein of the trance fusion band Disco Biscuits. While some of the songs were written prior to Brownstein's dismissal from the band in January 2000, the opera was finished with and debuted by Electron. The most recent full performance of the Chemical Warfare Brigade rock opera was on May 24, 2026, at the Mishawaka Amphitheatre in Colorado.

== Performance History ==
The Chemical Warfare Brigade has been performed twelve times. All performances were performed by The Disco Biscuits except as noted.

- August 18, 2000 at Trocadero Theatre in Philadelphia, Pennsylvania (performed by Electron)
- December 30, 2000, at The Vanderbilt in Plainview, New York
- April 26, 2001, at Roxy Theatre in Atlanta, Georgia
- November 6, 2002, at The Odeon in Cleveland, Ohio
- November 28, 2003, at Webster Theater in Hartford, Connecticut
- May 11, 2008, at Cervantes Masterpiece Ballroom in Denver, Colorado (performed by Electron)
- June 3, 2009, at Lupo's Heartbreak Hotel in Providence, Rhode Island
- May 11, 2013, at Toad's Place in New Haven, Connecticut (performed by Electron)
- December 31, 2013, at the Theater at Madison Square Garden
- April 21, 2017, at the Highline Ballroom in New York City (performed by Electron)
- March 26, 2017, at the Barkley Ballroom in Frisco, Colorado (performed by Electron)
- May 24, 2026, at the Mishawaka Amphitheatre in Colorado

== Characters ==
=== Amos Anderson ===
Amos Anderson is a high school dropout from rural Tennessee who is struggling to find employment. His most recent job was working as a carpenter for Albert Lai a few summers before the story begins. He is physically imposing but lacks confidence, particularly around women, and spends much of his time drinking. He considers himself a loyal friend to Lai, a feeling Lai appears to share.

=== Albert Lai ===
Albert “Bert” Lai has lived outside town for three years but no one knows what he does for a living. He does not appear to have a job or need any more money. Bert’s residence has an extensive security system, especially for the area, a crime-free district. He hosts large and popular parties, and there are lots of alcohol and women at his compound.

Bert has numerous residences, but has spent most of his adult life running a money laundering operation out of a Newark, New Jersey restaurant called Empire Hunan, and has strong connections to organized crime families in New York, New Jersey, Pennsylvania, Chicago, and Kansas City.

=== Doctor Edwin Von Statdt ===
Doctor Edwin “Doc” Von Statdt is of German descent but born and raised in New York. He has been a chemist for around thirty years. Doc has a twenty-year-old son named Lukas whom he has not seen in five years, after Lukas' mother, his common law wife, took Lukas and left. Doc transferred to the local university in the country several years ago after many years without tenure at City College of New York. He does not have a great deal of money, but he had never really wanted any. However, living in the country changed Doc’s mind. He liked the country, but began to wish he lived somewhere a little warmer. He believed he would be much better off on the beaches of a faraway place like Fiji, Micronesia, or the Galapagos.

=== Amy Willard ===
Amy is a thirty-three-year-old agent for the Federal Bureau of Investigation who looks much younger than she is. Amy had always wanted to go into law enforcement. After graduating from Georgetown, she went to the FBI training center. She graduated from the training program six years earlier and qualified for undercover work when she was twenty-five. Amy works on undercover operations involving the illegal use of drugs. On one such operation, she was sent to the local university, where it was believed that a young man had gotten involved in a large operation that produced and distributed amphetamines. In her second month at the school, under the alias of Shelby Rose, Amy attended a party at Albert Lai's compound, where rumor had it, several ounces of the drug were going to be transferred from one person to another. It was at this party that she began to realize there was something larger going on than she has previously suspected. The drug ring she was investigating seemed to have links to several other major metropolitan areas, and she suspected possible mafia ties. Amy thought that hanging around at Bert’s place would be in her best interest.

== Plot ==
=== The Plan ===
The Plan was simple. Amos knew what was going on over at Bert's. When the construction jobs dried up, Bert had told Amos that he could come to him if he ever needed anything. It was when he repeated himself and said emphatically, "anything", that Amos understood. Amos always turned down Bert's offer for "legal" work. But one night in a drunken conversation with the doctor at a local bar, Amos finds out about a chemical that Doc is working with at the University. The research indicates that the chemical kills anything that it comes into contact with, but that it leaves virtually no trace of itself. The research project on the chemical, which the University had named Veritin-22, was originally funded to see if there could be possible uses for it as a pesticide, but the research indicates that there is no control over what it kills. It kills everything that it comes into contact with, and the doctor speculates in passing that even a small amount could kill a large population of buffalo, elephants, monkeys, or even people. And as a product of the chemical decomposition, it would not leave a trace of itself. They decide to have a meeting with Albert Lai to see if any of his friends could use such a powerful stealth weapon. Their new chemical could sell for hundreds of thousands of dollars.

=== The Meeting ===
The Meeting took place at the compound, which Amos was happy about, as any trip to the compound was more exciting than his average day. And considering that he helped build it, he knew the ins and outs of the place, which made him feel smart (which he liked a lot). The idea intrigued Lai and he liked the fact that a scientist was involved. Actually, his first thought was that the Doctor may be involved with the authorities, but he knew a quick background check would clear up any of his concerns. He figured that they could all make millions with his connections in China and Nicaragua, and the Doctor indicated that he could basically produce an endless supply of this as long as the "research project" continued. Lai was definitely interested, as long as everything checked out okay. He insisted that the Doctor and Amos stick around for one of his patented shindigs, which was already going on outside the cabana at the pool. When the meeting adjourned, they allowed themselves the pleasure of a few drinks and some casual flirting with some of the local college ladies.

=== The Party ===
The party was fantastic, from the viewpoint of Amos. They left the meeting and went to the bar. Of course, the parties, although large and exciting, were invite only. Bert insisted that they meet some of the girls that were mulling around. He introduces Amos to Shelby as a business associate, which made Amos feel important. Shelby acted really interested in everything that Amos said, as he was the first business associate of Lai's that she had met who seemed vulnerable. In the two months that she had been hanging around Lai's there was never any talk of business around the ladies. She could not seem to penetrate his business dealings, until she met Amos. She sensed his weakness and figured she would go even deeper undercover than her job had ever required. But that was Amy, always going the extra distance, and besides, this guy actually seemed really innocent. And he was attractive. And she had not had any sexual relations in some time. So Amy, or Shelby as Amos knew her, engaged Amos in the time of his life. He was in love immediately. A beautiful, smart, funny girl, and she was young, and best of all, she seemed to like him. When the Doctor was passing out near the guest house, Shelby and Amos were sitting quietly by the pool getting to know each other.

=== The Deception ===
What seemed like weeks went by and Amos could not believe it. This was his first real girlfriend, truly amazing. Walks in the park, hikes that led to waterfalls, and trips to the zoo packed Amos' next few days. He spent all of his free time (which was most of his time) with Shelby. He even let on to her that they would take a vacation together to the islands as soon as some money came in, which would be soon. You see, the future was bright. He was nervous that she would get bored of him, and so he told her how rich he was going to be, hoping that she would stay with him. It was not before long, and not without ample prodding by Shelby that Amos told her all about the plan to make the chemical weapon and sell it and retire to the islands. The Chemical Warfare Brigade, he called the three of them. She finally had some insider information into Albert Lai's dealings. And it just so happened that her knowledge of the plan could save potentially hundreds of thousands of lives. But then the plan changed. Amos ultimately convinced Doctor Von Stadt that if they left Lai alive they would end up dead, and if they made the chemical, thousands of people would die. Amos was able to convince the Doctor that killing Lai was absolutely necessary. They could always back out, but they were already knee deep in this thing. And the truth was, however they could get the money, they would at this point. So they revamped their plan yet again. It was official. Plan B. Go in shooting, take the money, and get the hell out of there.

=== The Confrontation ===
Everything went exactly as planned. Amos knew all about the security systems on the compound. He had installed most of them. They came in and took out one guard, and then went for the security mainframe. When it was disengaged, they waited at the bottom of the stairs for the second guard. As he came down the stairs, they took him out. They went up the stairs to Lai's office. Before he could even say anything, he was shot. A shootout with the three bodyguards that were remaining ensued, and Amos and the Doctor were the last men standing.

=== The Outcome ===
As they left the house, they heard the helicopters, and saw the floodlights. They heard the sirens in the distance. The cops were there. Already. The Doctor never told anybody about this. Who had Amos told? Before Amos could even give a reason for why it was okay that he told Shelby what he was doing that evening, the Doctor, formally a meek man, turned his gun on Amos, and at once, removed his face from what was once his head. And then he started to run. He ran for his life. And as he ran, all of the facts of the story started to flash randomly through his mind. Flashbacks. He is running so hard, he starts to hallucinate. The lights are shining from the sky. There is faint screaming in the distance, and he knew that the law was on his tail. He has always stayed in good shape, but he was never prepared for this kind of a chase. The Doctor, when backed against the wall by a group of screaming agents, knows that there is only one thing that he can do. He realized that he can not live through the horror of a trial and a life in prison with a possible death penalty. He knew the truth. Death was an inevitable part of life. Everyone's time would come, and his had. He had had fantasies for many years. Big dreams. Maybe in another life. The doctor turns the gun on himself and pulls the trigger.

== Songs ==
=== Plan B ===
P.O.V. of the Doctor. It sets up a flashback situation. The story starts with the Doctor running down a narrow path during the night, setting up the theme of the story, life and death, and the preparedness for the inevitable. The verses of the song explain a little history of the main characters. The Doctor never thought that he would ever become the type of man to be involved with something such as this. He was a scientist. That was his talent. He never imagined doing anything illegal, although for some reason he also thought he would never get caught.

=== Little Lai ===
A story about Amos, the Doctor, and their connections to Bert, the quiet and calm leader of an organized crime group in New Jersey. The first verse is a recount from the Doctors perspective, explaining the fact that he leads a simple and frugal life. It is not until he sees the inside of Bert's compound that he truly got excited about the money that they were going to make. The story of the meeting and the party are referenced in this song.

=== And the Ladies Were the Rest of the Night ===
The Ladies is told from Amy Willard's point of view. He would not give it up‚ she could not seem to get any information on Albert Lai, and she knew he was at least involved in her drug investigation. She tried to get a tap into the compound, but the security was too tough. And Lai never spoke business around the Ladies. She knew upon meeting Amos that he was the weak link. Just a hunch. She pursued him and went beyond the call of duty, shall we say, DEEP undercover.

=== Floodlights ===
This song serves as a reminder to the listener that as the story is being told, the Doctor is still being chased. The lights are swinging back and forth from above, and he continues to run for his life. In the distance are sirens, faint yelling, and dogs barking. The Doctor is coming to grips with the fact that he is, for the first time ever, actually facing death. And it is during Floodlights that the Doctor first realizes that he has the power to end this all.

=== Shelby Rose ===
The lust song. Amos, thinking that he is in love, recounts the excitement he feels for his new relationship. For Amos, every night with Shelby truly is Heaven sent. The irony is that this relationship is the best and worst thing that has ever happened to him.

=== Chemical Warfare Brigade ===
Back to the Doctors point of view. More thoughts from the Doctor about his present situation. The Chemical Warfare Brigade, as he and Amos jokingly called the three of them in a drunken stupor one night, actually did represent the only chance that these guys ever had for prosperity. At one point, the future was bright, but now the Doctor knows what the outcome of this all is going to be...

=== Three Wishes ===
This song is a side bar to the main plot, and flashes forward several weeks past the end of the story‚ it is told from the perspective of the Doctors estranged son, right after he received the news that his father had passed. The son had not seen him since he left for Tennessee several years earlier. They were not extraordinarily close. Lukas was a musician in an aspiring band. His father did not disapprove, but did not necessarily approve of this decision. Doctor Von Stadt started to grow distant after his son's mother had left with him eight years earlier. But his son had actually planned a surprise visit to his dad, when his band was taking his first national tour, which was taking them through Nashville and Memphis. He never had the chance...

=== Confrontation ===
This is the story of the end. This song explains why the Doctor had to take the life of Amos. It is among the Doctor's last moment alive. In the end chorus he claims, "And for the moments time I wish I had the nerve." And in the next moment he finds the nerve, and with the pull of the trigger, the story ends.
