= They Missed the Perfume =

Studio album by Disco Biscuits
- Released: April 3, 2001 (US) (CD)
- Studio: Belyea Power Plant Studios, Easton, Pennsylvania
- Genre: Electronica
- Length: 51:20
- Label: Megaforce
- Producer: Jon Lesser, The Disco Biscuits

Disco Biscuits chronology
Uncivilized Area (1998)	They Missed the Perfume (2001)	Señor Boombox (2002)

They Missed the Perfume is a Disco Biscuits studio album from 2001.

== Reception ==
Professional ratings
Review scores
Source	Rating
Allmusic	3/5 stars

Allmusic gave the album a generally positive review. Admitting that "Occasionally, the arrangements venture into trite post-hippie anthemia", they nonetheless concluded that "the disc continues to yield surprises far beyond most studio releases of the genre."

== Track listing ==
No.	Title	Writer(s)	Length
1.	"Highwire"	Sam Altman, Marc Brownstein, Jon Gutwillig, Aron Magner	3:57
2.	"Spacebirdmatingcall"	Altman, Brownstein, Gutwillig, Magner	8:24
3.	"Haleakala Crater"	Gutwillig	11:20
4.	"Home Again"	Brownstein	5:44
5.	"Mindless Dribble"	Gutwillig	13:41
6.	"I Remember When"	Altman, Brownstein, Gutwillig, Magner	8:14

== Personnel ==
The Disco Biscuits

- Jon Gutwillig – guitar, vocals
- Aron Magner – keyboards, vocals
- Marc Brownstein – bass, vocals
- Sam Altman – drum programming, vocals

Additional musician

- Erica Lynn Gruenberg – additional vocals on "Home Again"

Production

- Jon Lesser – producer, engineer
- The Disco Biscuits – producer, engineer, mixing
- Charles Scott IV – mixing
- Andy Action – mixing assistant
- Keith Grewell – mastering
- Dean Chamberlain – photography
- Stefano Giovannini – photography
