= Idlewhile =

Idlewhile is a Longmont, Colorado based Americana folk band, described as pop infused country/bluegrass.

Formed by Steven Phoenix, Giselle Collazo, Miguel Ramos (formerly of the Boulder, CO band Cabaret Diosa])and songwriter friend Doug Holden in May 2010. Paul Tedesco joined the project on double bass and Matthew Lawlor stepped in to take over drums, banjo and harmony vocals in November 2010. Holden left the group in October 2011, and was replaced by Chad Granoff on guitar and mandolin before being replaced by Seth Goodman (formerly of the Boulder, CO band 18 Switchbacks.) in August 2012.

Their focus has been on live performances with 50 live performances throughout Colorado in their first 18 months together. Idlewhile released their first album in 2011 on iTunes with a blend of original studio-produced and live songs. Idlewhile’s musical style has been called “richly acoustic on one hand, seductively rock on the other.” by the Longmont Times-Call.

Their music has been compared to Colorado bands Elephant Revival and Paper Bird

== History ==
Phoenix and Collazo began writing and playing music together at the end of the workweek. Phoenix named their collaboration Idlewhile to celebrate this idle and peaceful time. In 2012, a violin player, Ramos heard their tunes and suggested they take it seriously and bring their music to the public. Together they set out to recruit “musician friends who shared the vision.”

== Recording History ==
Albums:
Idlewhile – Postcard 2011 Released February 12, 2011
Featured on Adventure Records Cuvee 7 Compilation, with their pop/folk song "Monkeys" alongside tracks from The Yawpers, SuperCollider, Tommy & The Tangerines, Dechen Hawk and Mr. Anonymous

== Members ==
Giselle Collazo: Lead vocals, guitar, percussion and keys
Steven Phoenix: Vocals and guitar
Miguel Ramos: Violin, lap steel and piano arrangements
Paul Tedesco: Double Bass
Matthew Lawlor: Drums, backup vocals and banjo

== Idlewhile Shows ==
2011
1/10 - KGNU 88.5 Live Broadcast
4/22 - Rock and Soul – Boulder with Themes
8/14 - Larimer Lounge – Denver with Varlet (Lilly Scott’s band – a top-2 finalist on American Idol)
11/13 - Larimer Lounge – Denver with Chimney Choir
2012
1/21 – KZMU 90.1 Live Feature
6/4 - KGNU 88.5 Live Broadcast
4/12 – Hi Dive – Denver with Shon Sullivan of Goldenboy played w/Elliot Smith
7/29 - Larimer Lounge with Sonia Leigh
