= Disco biscuits =

Disco biscuits or Disco Biscuits may refer to:

- Disco Biscuits, an American band
- Disco biscuits, slang for several recreational drugs:
  - Methaqualone or Quaalude, popularised in the 1960s
  - MDMA or ecstasy, popularised in the 1980s
