= Esmé Patterson =

American singer-songwriter

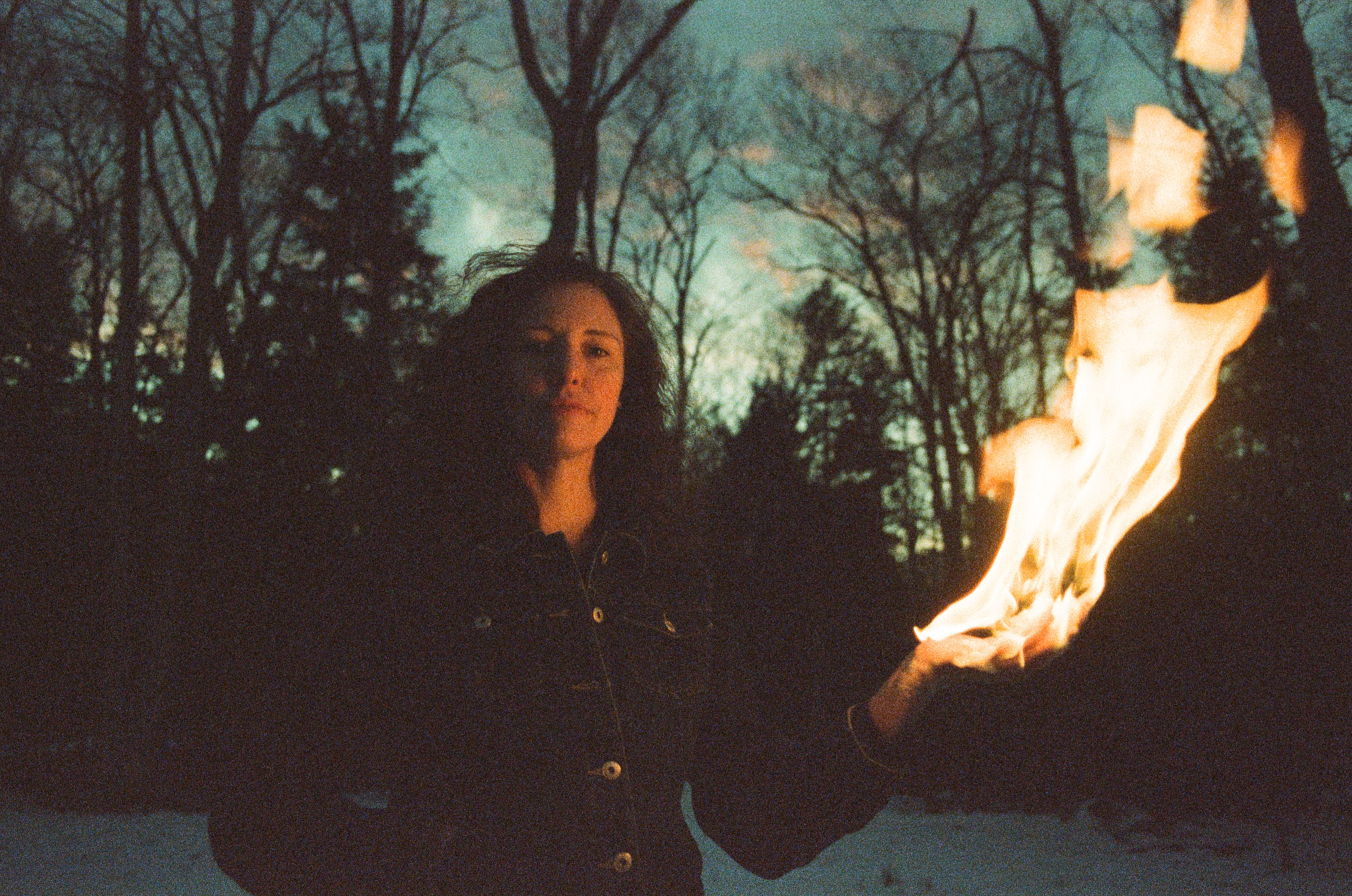
- Esmé Patterson on the cover of Notes from Nowhere

Background information
- Born: October 20, 1985 (age 40); Boulder, Colorado
- Origin: Denver, Colorado
- Genres: Folk; Indie rock; Dream pop
- Instruments: Vocals; guitar
- Years active: 2006–present
- Labels: Sony/BMG, Illegal Pete's Greater Than Collective, Xtra Mile Recordings, Grand Jury, Fat Possum Records
- Formerly of: Paper Bird
- Website: esmepattersonmusic.com

Esmé Patterson is an American gold-selling recording artist in the US and Canada, originally from Denver, Colorado, and currently residing in Nashville, Tennessee. She is a founding former member of the indie folk band Paper Bird and has released five full-length studio albums as a solo artist.

== Career ==
Founding Paper Bird, Ballet Commission, & Beginning of Solo Career

Patterson began her career in her hometown of Boulder, Colorado, co-founding Paper Bird, but exited the band after pursuing her own solo career, and the remaining six members disbanded the group soon thereafter.

Patterson and Paper Bird were commissioned by Ballet Nouveau Colorado in 2010 to compose and perform the music for a ballet entitled "Carry On", which debuted in 2011 and found acclaim among Colorado audiences. "I would generally say it is joyful," Patterson told the Colorado Daily of the ballet in 2011. "Carry On", an associated live album of the musical performances of the ballet, was mixed by Jeremy Averitt and released on 11 June 2011. Averitt would later join the band backing Patterson's solo career as its bassist.

In 2012, Patterson signed with Greater Than Collective, a Denver-based independent label funded by Illegal Pete's, and released her debut album entitled All Princes, I, for which she received favorable critical reviews from American Songwriter and Colorado's 5280 Magazine.

The album was officially released on 20 October 2012 with a corresponding release performance at L2 Arts & Culture Center in Denver, Colorado with Patterson backed by a thirteen-piece orchestral ensemble. Westword's Josiah Hesse described the album as "an authentic and infectious gift," but the grueling touring schedule of Paper Bird kept Patterson from performing her own solo tour on the album. She later told an interviewer that she was given an ultimatum by the members of Paper Bird to either quit pursuing her solo career or quit the band: “The band gave me an ultimatum: Quit doing your solo thing, or quit the band,” Patterson told The Denver Post's interviewer, Dylan Owens in 2016, “So I quit the band.” Paper Bird disbanded following Patterson's departure, and Patterson continued to tour, performing her own work.

First of TED Talks Concerning Women in Popular Songs

During a 2013 interview with Colorado Daily regarding an upcoming TEDxTalk she was asked to present on the subject of a woman's experiences in music, Patterson confided that she was prompted by her own experiences to begin writing songs that told the other side of the story from the perspective of the objectified female characters in hit songs, of which she previewed a few in her TEDxTalk at the Newman Center for the Performing Arts on 15 November 2013. The songs would later appear on her second full-length solo album Woman to Woman.

Co-Writing "Dearly Departed" and Gold Record Certifications

Prior to signing with Dualtone Records, artist Shakey Graves (Alejandro Rose-Garcia) was a frequent opening act for Paper Bird on their US tours, and Patterson co-wrote three songs for his debut 2014 label release And the War Came, one of which, "Dearly Departed", reached No. 5 on the Billboard Adult Alternative Airplay chart, No. 49 on the Billboard Hot Rock & Alternative Songs chart, and No. 49 on the Alternative 30 of the Canadian Rock Music Charts. Patterson performed the song on Conan and The Late Show with David Letterman in late 2014 and early 2015, respectively. Her 2014 performance of the song broadcast from the SXSW Pandora House garnered 9.5 million viewers. The song earned Patterson RIAA Gold Certification in the US and Music Canada Gold Certification in 2020 and 2021, respectively, and was nominated for Song of the Year at the 2015 Americana Music Awards held at Nashville's Ryman Auditorium, at which she gave a broadcast performance of the song.

Release of Woman to Woman and Second TEDx Appearance

In 2015, Patterson released her second full-length album titled Woman to Woman, a collection of original response songs to "male-gaze" hits from the perspective of the female subject of each song, on the UK label Xtra Mile Recordings in the UK and US, gaining wide acclaim from the international critics for several music publications including Vice Magazine, The Guardian, and Bust Magazine. "The Glow" was premiered by Spin Magazine online and Patterson made an associated music video in which she portrays a version of the female main character Caroline from The Beach Boys' hit song "Caroline, No". "Valentine" tells an alternate story from the perspective of the title female character in Elvis Costello's hit song "Alison", and was premiered online by American Songwriter. "Never Chase a Man" proffers the thoughts and feelings of Jolene, the female subject of Dolly Parton's hit song of the same name, and was premiered by Austin, TX Public Radio station KUTX.

The album's popularity and theme gained the attention of TEDx organizers, who tapped Patterson for another TED Talk, this time at Ellie Caulkins Opera House on the topic "Ideas Unbridled: Revisiting Her Side of the Story", discussing the need to recognize and respond to the problematic themes of hit songs that objectify and demean their main female characters.

We Were Wild and NPR Tiny Desk Appearance

Patterson released her third full-length album in 2016 entitled We Were Wild, her first for Fat Possum Records, which caught the attention of Rolling Stone and The New York Times, who reviewed the album as a stark departure from her previous efforts yet recommended its selections within their published playlists. The album was recorded and mixed in Portland, Oregon after Patterson relocated there in 2015, and she performed its lead single "No River" and other selections on NPR's Tiny Desk Concerts of 10 February 2017.

In the same year, Patterson recorded a duet with UK recording artist Frank Turner, a fellow Xtra Mile -signed artist, which appeared on his album Positive Songs for Negative People.

Also in 2016, Patterson worked with Bloodshot Records artist William Elliott Whitmore, whom she had toured with in 2015, to create a record in which each played a song written by the other on each side of a split 7-inch double-sided single released by Bloodshot Records in November, 2016 and acquired by Rough Trade Records as a limited edition printing. Entitled Play Each Other's Songs, the A side features Whitmore covering Patterson's song "Elysium", and Patterson in turn covering Whitmore's "Not Feeling Any Pain" on the B side. The record garnered favorable reviews by critics and a video shot in downtown Los Angeles featuring Patterson dancing to "Not Feeling Any Pain".

BMG Contract, There Will Come Soft Rains, and COVID19 Tour Cancellation

Patterson released her fourth record on March 6, 2020, titled There Will Come Soft Rains, after an apocalypse-themed Ray Bradbury work of the same name., her first on the BMG label with which she signed a multi-album contract. Coincidentally, this apocalypse-referencing album saw its March 6, 2020 release coincide with the first COVID-19 quarantine lockdowns throughout Patterson's home state of Colorado that same week. Patterson subsequently decided to cancel the scheduled release tour for the album, including her much-anticipated South by Southwest (SXSW) appearance, citing safety concerns for her band members and audiences alike during the COVID-19 Global Pandemic.

The album was favorably reviewed in Paste Magazine, who called it a "study in swagger and contrast" and noted its sudden pop sensibilities as yet another departure for Patterson from her previous work.

Tour with Os Mutantes' U.S. Return & Upcoming Album Hints

In 2022 and 2023, Patterson supported the influential group of the late 1960s Tropicália Brazilian art movement Os Mutantes during their first tour of the United States since 2006.

She told the audience during her opening set on 1 March 2023 at the Third Man Records Blue Room in Nashville, Tennessee that she had recorded an album on her farm in Tennessee, and began the set by performing one of the songs she had written for it.

Records indicate that the publishing rights of her catalog continue to be administered by BMG Rights Management as of July, 2023.

Patterson's official WikiMedia Commons account uploaded a photograph on July 30, 2023, captioned as the cover photo of her upcoming album entitled Notes from Nowhere, though no release date was given nor announcement made, and mentions that her husband helped stage the stunt photography.

The Nashville Scene premiered the video for 'Coming Down', the second of two pre-release singles from her forthcoming album Notes from Nowhere on 7 September 2023, and identified the release date of the album to coincide with a release party at East Nashville's The 5 Spot live music venue on 10 October 2023 with support from Ziona Riley and Abby Johnson. In reviewing the video premiere, Stephen Trageser, Music Editor for the Nashville Scene, described the single as "a quiet meditation on living in the moment."

== Discography ==
Studio albums

- All Princes, I (2012)
- Woman to Woman (2015)
- We Were Wild (2016)
- There Will Come Soft Rains (2020)
- Notes from Nowhere (2023)
