= Head for the Hills (band) =

US musical group

Head for the Hills is an American four-piece from Fort Collins, Colorado.

Formed in 2003, Head for the Hills consists of Adam Kinghorn (guitar/vocals), Joe Lessard (violin/vocals), Matt Loewen (upright bass/vocals), and Riley Williams (drums/vocals).

Head for the Hills' style of music is described as progressive bluegrass but it also explores Americana to jazz, indie rock, and hip-hop. All members contribute to songwriting and material arrangement, with the primary vocalists being Kinghorn and Lessard.

== History ==
Kinghorn, Lessard, Loewen, and founding member, Mike Chappell (mandolin) first formed the band during their freshman year of college at Colorado State University. Prior to this, Kinghorn and Chappell played music together as high school students in Golden, Colorado. Upon meeting Lessard and Loewen, they decided to pursue their mutual interest of bluegrass music. In 2003 and 2004 they played house parties and small local venues throughout the Front Range of Colorado.

Head for the Hills' first official show was at Higher Grounds Cafe in Golden, Colorado, in February 2004. In 2005, the band went on their first out-of-state tour to the Midwest. That same year the band played their inaugural season opening show at the Mishawaka Amphitheatre near Fort Collins, Colorado.

In 2007, Head for the Hills released their first studio album, Robber’s Roost, produced by Sally Van Meter. and most notably Telluride Bluegrass Festival in 2012. The summer of 2007, the band won the Northwest String Summit band competition at Horning's Hideout, an acoustic music festival outside Portland, Oregon. In the following years the band played the Wakarusa Music Festival, DelFest, High Sierra Music Festival, SXSW, Summer Camp Music Festival, RockyGrass, Mulberry Mountain Harvest Music Festival, and FloydFest

Head for the Hills has also performed on NPR's Ideastream and eTown.

In 2010, Head for the Hills released a self-titled album produced by Drew Emmitt at the home studio of Bill Nershi, The album was engineered by Gus Skinas, known for his work digitally remastered Pink Floyd's Dark Side of the Moon. In addition, Vance Powell mixed the record.

In 2014, Head for the Hills released their third studio album entitled Blue Ruin. This album was less focused on traditional bluegrass sounds and explored influences of hip-hop and gypsy jazz.

In 2015, Chappell left Head for the Hills. Sam Parks began playing with the group during the summer of 2015 and became a member in January 2016.

In February 2019, Head for the Hills announced the March 22 release of their Say Your Mind EP, Spring tour dates and music video for Never Does from new EP.

On March 28, 2019, Todd Patrick Livingston announced that he was joining Head for the Hills, Riley Williams followed soon after.

== Band members ==
- Adam Kinghorn (guitar/vocals)
- Joe Lessard (violin/octave violin/vocals)
- Matt Loewen (upright bass/clarinet/vocals)
- Riley Williams (drums/vocals)

=== Former members ===
- Mike Chappell (mandolin) 2003-2015
- Sam Parks (mandolin/violin/guitar/vocals)
- Todd Patrick Livingston (resophonic guitar/vocals)

== Additional references ==
- Brian F. Johnson (December 2012) Head for the Hills . Marquee Magazine. Retrieved March 29, 2016 (January 2014)
- Head for the Hills Interview. Telluride.com. Retrieved March 29, 2016
- Crescent Vale (July 2013) Fort Collins Bluegrass Kings Return to Throne. Retrieved March 30, 2016
- Kathrine Warren (December 2011) Colorado Bluegrass - Head for the Hills Plays Opera House Friday. Telluride News. Retrieved March 29, 2016
- A.H. Goldstein (June 2013) Head for the Hills. Denver Westword. Retrieved March 30, 2016
- Melissa Mylchreest (February 2010) Head for the Hills. . Missoula Independent. Retrieved March 30, 2016
- Scott Bernstein (August 2015) Head for the Hills Announce Fall Tour and Collaborative Beer. Jambase. Retrieved March 30, 2016
- Brian T. Atkinson (July 2013) Head for the Hills Are Destined for Blue Ruin . CMT Edge. Retrieved February 5, 2016
- Dreamspider Publication (May 2013) Head for the Hills Set to Release Blue Ruin on July 9th. The Grateful Web. Retrieved February 18, 2016
- John Curtis Goad (July 2013) Blue Ruin - Head for the Hills, Bluegrass Today. Retrieved February 15, 2016
- Rachel Hergett (November 2013) Head for the Hills heads to Filling Station.. Bozeman Daily Chronicle. Retrieved March 14, 2016
- John Sweigert (August 2012) Head for the Hills Meets Paws and Peaks. Tahoe Daily Tribune. Retrieved February 20, 2016
- Andrew Tuckman (July 2010) Head for the Hills at the Top of Their Game. Jam Band Friendly. Retrieved February 1, 2016
- Stephen Elliott (January 2016) Two Telluride Veterans Headline Weekend Sheridan Opera House Shows. .Telluride News. Retrieved February 18, 2016
- Mike Bookey (July 2009) Dorm Ditties: Head for the Hills on Breaking the Freshman Band Curse . Weekly Source. Retrieved February 20, 2016
- Andy Kahn (February 2016) Head for the Hills & Pert Near Sandstone Announce 2016 Spring Tour. Jambase. Retrieved March 30, 2016
- Lee Zimmerman (August 2013) Random Pickings with Lee Zimmerman The Bluegrass Situation. Retrieved March 30, 2016
- Head for the Hills Official Website
- Amazon - Head for the Hills
- Lisa Snedeker (July 2016) Don't Miss These Acts at FloydFest 16 The Huffington Post. Retrieved July 28, 2016
- Jackson Hole News and Guide (July 2016) Events Retrieved July 28, 2016
- Krista Driscoll (July 2016) Head for the Hills Performs July 20 as Part of Vail Summer Bluegrass Concert Series. The Vail Daily. Retrieved July 28, 2016.
