= We Were Wild =

Studio album by Esmé Patterson
- Released: June 10, 2016
- Studio: Type Foundry Studios (Portland, Oregon)
- Length: 38:12
- Label: Grand Jury Music
- Producer: Adam Thompson

Esmé Patterson chronology
Woman to Woman (2015)	We Were Wild (2016)	There Will Come Soft Rains (2020)

We Were Wild is the third studio album by the American singer-songwriter Esmé Patterson, released on June 10, 2016, via Grand Jury Music.

== Release ==
We Were Wild was released on June 10, 2016. A music video for the single "No River" directed by David Fishel was released alongside the album.

== Critical reception ==
Professional ratings
Review scores
Source	Rating
Paste	7.4/10
PopMatters	8/10
Rolling Stone	3.5/5 stars

The album was met with positive reviews from music critics. Jonathan Frahm of PopMatters praised the album, calling it "a comeback worthy of celebration."

== Track listing ==
We Were Wild track listing
No.	Title	Length
1.	"Feel Right"	3:01
2.	"No River"	2:50
3.	"Francine"	3:43
4.	"Moth Song"	3:38
5.	"The Waves"	2:54
6.	"Guadalupe"	3:53
7.	"Wantin' Ain't Gettin'"	2:51
8.	"Come See Me"	2:33
9.	"We Were Wild"	3:15
10.	"Find It"	3:17
11.	"Yours and Mine"	2:48
12.	"Alone"	3:29
Total length:		38:12

== Personnel ==
Credits are adapted from the We Were Wild liner notes.

Musicians

- Esmé Patterson – vocals; electric and acoustic guitars; backup vocals; vocal effects
- Adam Thompson – bass; synthesizer; mono/poly; sampler; processing; guitar
- Brian Wright – drums and percussion
- Charlie Glenn – lead electric guitar; 12-string guitar
- Philippe Bronchtein – acoustic guitar; Wurlitzer; piano; organ; MIDI keys
- Johanna Kunin – backup vocals
- Sean Flinn – additional electric guitar
- Martin Gonzalez – sampling
- Paul Brainard – pedal steel

Production and artwork

- Esmé Patterson – writing; arrangement
- Adam Thompson – producer; arrangement; additional tracking
- Martin Gonzalez – post-production assistance
- Adam Selzer – mixing
- Howie Weinberg – mastering
- Gentry Studer – mastering assistant
- Rodrigo Melgarejo – cover photograph
- Devvon Simpson – interior layout photographs
- Michael Buchmiller – album layout
