= The Wind at Four to Fly =

Live album by The Disco Biscuits
- Released: April 18, 2006
- Recorded: December 27–31, 2004
- Genre: Trance fusion
- Label: SCI Fidelity

The Disco Biscuits chronology
TranceFusion Radio Broadcast Vol. 1-4 (2004)	The Wind at Four to Fly (2006)

Professional ratings
Review scores
Source	Rating
Allmusic	3.5/5 stars
JamBase	
Okayplayer	3.5/5 stars

The Wind at Four to Fly is a 2006 live release by the trance fusion band Disco Biscuits. It was released on SCI Fidelity on April 18, 2006. It is the second to last album with the original line-up (Rocket 3 being the last) and contains songs from shows recorded between December 27–31, 2004. The vocals, however, were re-recorded in the studio, in single takes to replicate a live performance.

The album's two discs are divided thematically: Disc One contains shorter songs while Disc Two was intended to showcase the band's longer jamming capabilities. "Little Shimmy in a Conga Line" segues seamlessly into "Pat and Dex," resulting in 25 minutes of uninterrupted music.

== Track listing ==
Disc one
No.	Title	Writer(s)	Date/venue	Length
1.	"World Is Spinning"	Jon Gutwillig	Dec. 31, 2004 Hammerstein Ballroom, New York, NY	3:52
2.	"Voices Insane"	Gutwillig	Dec. 27, 2004 Palace Theater, Albany, NY	11:43
3.	"Caterpillar"	Marc Brownstein	Dec. 31, 2004 Hammerstein Ballroom, New York, NY	12:50
4.	"Kitchen Mitts"	Gutwillig	Dec. 29, 2004 Electric Factory, Philadelphia, PA	9:42
5.	"Sweating Bullets"	Gutwillig	Dec. 30, 2004 Electric Factory, Philadelphia, PA	7:56
6.	"Wet"	Brownstein	Dec. 28, 2004 Avalon Ballroom, Boston, MA	5:36
7.	"Spy"	Aron Magner	Dec. 29, 2004 Electric Factory, Philadelphia, PA	12:46
8.	"Morph Dusseldorf"	Brownstein	Dec. 30, 2004 Electric Factory, Philadelphia, PA	12:37
Total length:				77:02

Disc two
No.	Title	Writer(s)	Date/venue	Length
1.	"Story of the World"	Gutwillig	Dec. 30, 2004 Electric Factory, Philadelphia, PA	17:25
2.	"Basis for a Day"	Gutwillig, Kevin Abrahms	Dec. 29, 2004 Electric Factory, Philadelphia, PA	29:28
3.	"Little Shimmy in a Conga Line"	Gutwillig	Dec. 29, 2004 Electric Factory, Philadelphia, PA	17:08
4.	"Pat and Dex"	Gutwillig, Brownstein, Ben Hayflick	Dec. 29, 2004 Electric Factory, Philadelphia, PA	8:30
Total length:				72:31

== Personnel ==
- Jon Gutwillig – Guitar, Vocals
- Marc Brownstein – Bass, Vocals
- Aron Magner – Keyboards, Vocals
- Sam Altman – Drums
