= Frogs Gone Fishin' =

American rock band

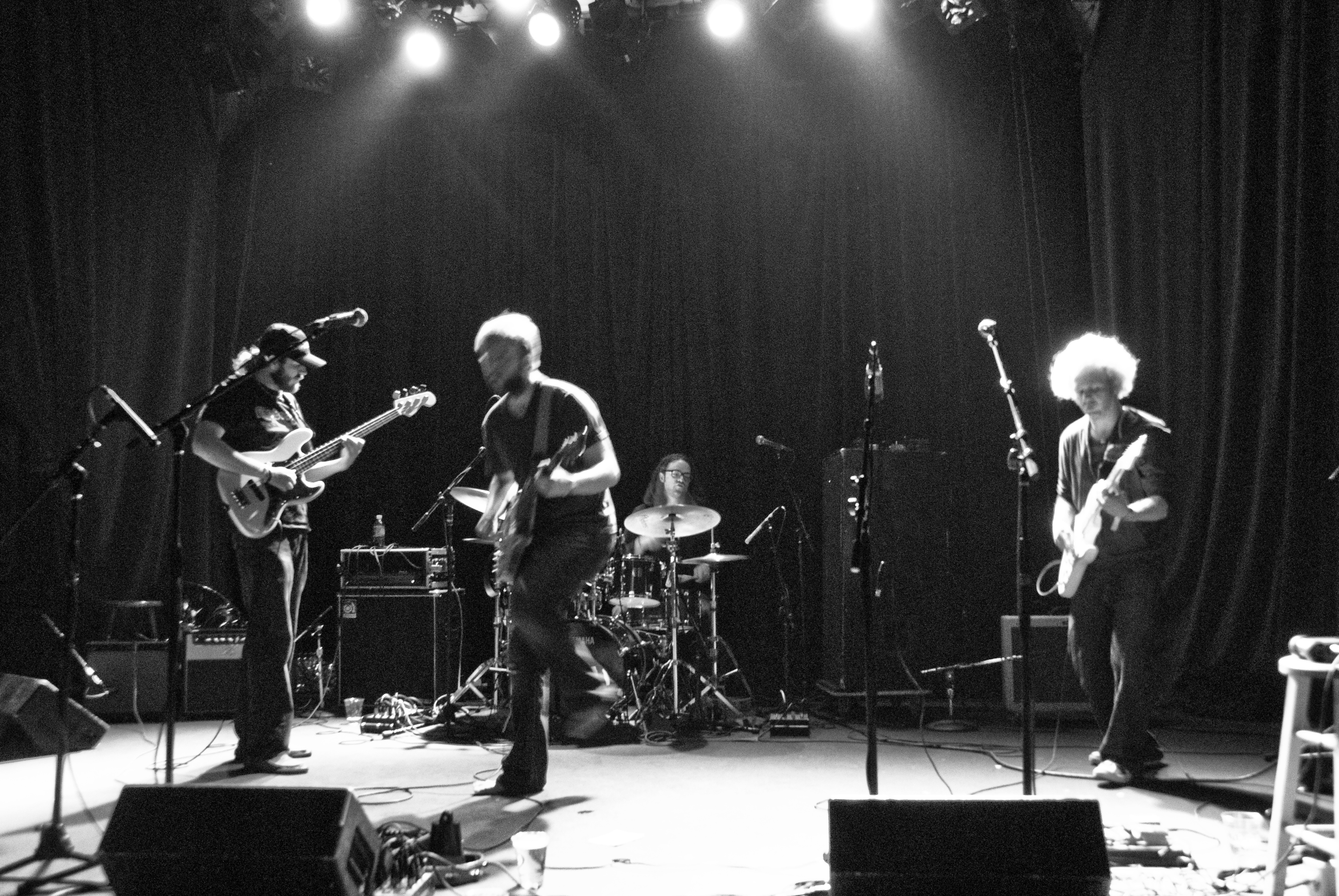

Background information
- Origin: Nashville, Tennessee, USA
- Genres: Progressive rock, funk
- Years active: 2005–present
- Labels: Oh/Ya Records, Mountain Size Records
- Members: Andrew Portwood; Trevor Jones; Alex Scott; Jeff Jani
- Past members: Steve Rogers; Mark Levy; Dax Hunter; Wes Baily; Billy Twibell; Ari Michaeli; Stephen Kraft; Zander Masser; Philip Mistretta; Carl Gatti; Zack Mayernik
- Website: www.frogsgonefishin.com

Frogs Gone Fishin' is an American rock band. Andrew Portwood (singer–songwriter and guitarist), Trevor Jones (guitarist/singer-songwriter), Alex Scott (bass), and Jeff Jani (drums) make up the four piece rock quartet.

== History ==
Frogs Gone Fishin' was formed in 2005 in Nashville by guitarists/singer-songwriters Trevor Jones and Andrew Portwood. Hurricane Katrina forced Jones to relocate to Nashville from New Orleans. The band's first line-up consisted of Nashville music students including Wes Baily (keyboards/vocalist) from the band Moon Taxi and various Katrina evacuees including members of New Orleans–based band The Zoo. Frogs Gone Fishin' performed its first show at "3 Crow Bar" in East-Nashville in October 2005 and continued to perform in small clubs and venues in Nashville, until Jones returned to New Orleans in winter 2006. Original bass guitarist Billy Twibell died in May 2006 in a car accident in Savannah. The group had various members from 2006 to 2007 when Portwood reconnected with Jones, Boston musician Mark Levy (drummer/percussionist), and friend Steve Rogers (bass guitar/vocalist) in August 2007 and signed to Oh/Ya Records.

=== Formation ===
Frogs Gone Fishin' began writing and rehearsing tunes with Mark Levy and Steve Rogers in a Nashville upstairs loft in July and August 2007. The band began writing, recording, and experimenting with sounds and instruments while living together in the loft for over a month and focused on getting enough songs written and rehearsed to record their first album on indie label Oh/Ya Records. Levy returned to Boston and Jones returned to New Orleans until May 2008, when the band members moved to their home state of Colorado.

== Tell Me True ==
In 2007, Frogs Gone Fishin' recorded their debut album Tell Me True in Colorado and Nashville. The band all lived in a Nashville house while recording the album. Tell Me True was released on June 17, 2008 on indie label Oh/Ya Records. The band released the record in Colorado and began to tour the album with some local radio play with the song "Mexico" and "Life in a Magazine".

=== Colorado ===
The band relocated to Colorado in May 2008. The Tell Me True tour of 2008 led the band into the Midwest and southern regions of America and exposed the group to life on the road. The Frogs played over 50 shows in 35 cities that autumn with stops in Chicago, Nashville, Austin, and New Orleans. The members of Frogs Gone Fishin' have their roots in Colorado and all attended grade school together and were in various music groups before they formed the group. The group has performed with other Colorado-based bands like The Samples, Kinetix, Polytoxic, Springdale Quartet, and Elephant Revival. In July 2009 the band performed at Ford Amphitheater in Vail for a sold-out crowd. Throughout 2010 and 2011, Frogs Gone Fishin' toured around the United States and attended several festivals, including the remodeled State Bridge Amphitheater in Bond, Colorado.

=== New Orleans ===
Frogs Gone Fishin' moved to New Orleans in early 2009 for a few months. The group performed with George Porter Jr. during a Mardi Gras celebration concert in the French Quarter that spring. The band began to expand their music and performances playing over 30 shows in New Orleans in the spring of 2009. The band played two post-Jazz Fest shows at the Balcony Music Club and stamped a place in the New Orleans music scene sitting in with personalities like Johnny Sketch, Dirty Notes, Walter "Wolfman" Washington, Papa Grows Funk, Jonny Vidacovich, Stanton Moore, and other musicians from New Orleans. The Frogs wrapped up their stay in New Orleans with two shows on Oak St. in front of Frenchy's art gallery. On every year, they travel to the Crescent City to write and perform original and traditional music.

== Mountain Size Records ==
The band signed to Colorado-based label Mountain Size Records in October 2009. The label is run by Brad Smalling (engineer/producer) and Eric McLennan (songwriter/musician). They went into Evergroove Studio in Evergreen, Colorado in October 2009 to begin work on their second album, Actual Natural. The Frogs continued to play shows in Colorado during the winter months and wrapped up recording in February 2010. During the mix and production of the album, the band traveled back to New Orleans to perform and write.

=== Actual Natural ===
This album was released on May 8, 2010. The band's single "Actual Natural" was featured on the CD of the Relix Magazine on July as a promotion single. During the recording process, Hollywood director and screenwriter Travis Milloy produced and directed two music videos for the band.

=== Membership changes ===
After the supporting tours for Actual Natural, drummer Dax Hunter was brought on to replace Mark Levy. Dax toured with the band until late 2011, when he was replaced by current drummer Jeff Jani. Steve Rogers (bass) also left the group in mid-2011, and left a rotating bass chair until now full-time bassist Alex Scott joined in December 2011. The band occasionally features "The Horny Toads" horn section.

== Members ==
=== Current members ===
- Andrew Portwood - vocals, rhythm guitars (2005–present)
- Trevor Jones - vocals, lead guitars, keyboards (2005–present)
- Alex Scott - bass guitars (2011–present)
- Jeff Jani - drums, percussion, electronics (2011–present)

=== Former members ===
- Steve Rogers - bass (2006-2011)
- Mark Levy - drums (2006-2010)
- Dax Hunter - drums (2011)
- Wes Baily - keyboards, vocals (2005–2006)
- Billy Twibell - bass guitars (2005)
- Stephen Kraft - drums (2005)
- Zander Masser - guitars (2006)
- Philip Mistretta - saxophones (2006)
- Carl Gatti - bass trombones (2006)
- Jack Mayernik - drums/percussion (2005–2006)

== Discography ==
=== Studio albums ===
*Tell Me True- 2007

- Actual Natural- 2010

=== Live albums ===
- Caught Live, Vol. 1
- Live in Telluride - NYE
