= Shakey Graves =

American Americana musician

- Shakey Graves performs at the Longhorn City Limits stage in 2021

Background information
- Born: Alejandro Rose-Garcia; June 4, 1987 (age 39); Austin, Texas
- Genre: Americana
- Occupations: Musician, singer, actor
- Instrument: Guitar
- Years active: 2007–present
- Label: Dualtone
- Spouse: Stephanie Hunt
- Website: shakeygraves.com

Shakey Graves (born Alejandro Rose-Garcia; June 4, 1987) is an American musician and actor from Austin, Texas.

His music combines blues, folk, country, and rock and roll. Rose-Garcia received his stage name at Old Settler's Music Festival in 2007 after a stranger, apparently high on LSD, rambled "spooky wagons". Then he and his friends jokingly gave each other Native American guide names over a campfire. After an inspired night of playing music, he decided to keep the name.

Rose-Garcia married fellow musician Stephanie Hunt in April 2023, and the couple had their first child, a girl, in 2024.

Both Rose Garcia and Hunt appeared in the TV series Friday Night Lights.

== Career ==
Before being known as Shakey Graves, Rose-Garcia had acting roles in Friday Night Lights and the Spy Kids franchise.

Shakey Graves became known for his one-man band set up and most of his 2011 self-released debut album Roll the Bones features him playing solo. This set up originated after he grew tired of having to borrow kick drums and high hats in order to perform. His solution consisted of a modified suitcase that functions as both a kick drum and a tambourine stand built by a close friend.

His unique style of performance led to him being asked to be the official “busker” for the Edward Sharpe and Mumford & Sons Railroad Revival Tour in 2011, where he played music for patrons entering each venue. His follow-up EP The Donor Blues was released in 2012, and features a collection of recordings from 2009.

After being courted by multiple labels, Shakey Graves signed with Dualtone Records. When he began working on the album, he added other musicians to his recording process and live set, including multi-instrumentalists Patrick O'Connor, Jon Shaw, and Chris Boosahda, who produced the album. Three of the songs, including "Dearly Departed", were co-written by Esmé Patterson, and Patterson additionally appeared on the album as the featured artist on the studio recordings of all songs she co-wrote for the album. The album, titled And the War Came, was released on October 7, 2014.

Shakey Graves then began touring as a three-piece band. The band made their television debut on October 14, 2014, with Esmé Patterson, on Conan, and then appeared on the Late Show with David Letterman, performing "Dearly Departed" with the song's co-writer Esmé Patterson. The band performed their next single, "The Perfect Parts", on Late Night with Seth Meyers. On May 6, 2015, the band performed on Austin City Limits. In December of 2015, the band appeared on the highly regarded Tiny Desk Concert by NPR Music, performing select songs from And the War Came.

In September 2015, Shakey Graves won the Best Emerging Artist award at the 2015 Americana Music Awards.

On February 9, 2012, Lee Leffingwell, the Mayor of Austin at the time, proclaimed a "Shakey Graves Day". Every year on February 9 through the 11th, Shakey Graves offers all of his music, including unreleased albums such as The State of Texas vs. Alejandro Rose-Garcia, Story of My Life, As Per Request, and West of Calgary on Bandcamp for pay-what-you-want prices. Exclusive merchandise and content is also created and released with each Shakey Graves Day. A portion of the proceeds made from sales through Bandcamp and the Shakey Graves Day concerts are donated to a charity of Shakey Graves' choice.

On June 30, 2017, the band released The Donor Blues and Nobody's Fool as a collection titled Shakey Graves and the Horse He Rode In On on vinyl and streaming services under the Dualtone label.

Shakey Graves released his third studio album, Can't Wake Up, on May 4, 2018, on Dualtone Records. On May 8, 2020, Shakey Graves released the Look Alive EP.

On April 2, 2021, Shakey Graves re-released his debut album Roll the Bones on Dualtone Records for its 10-year anniversary. The album was originally self-released on CD-R. Entitled Roll the Bones X, the re-release includes additional songs not included on the original. The album reached number 136 on the US Billboard 200.

On May 31, 2022, Shakey Graves appeared on Jimmy Kimmel Live! performing "This Town" with Trixie Mattel.

On February 9, 2023, Shakey Graves released Deadstock - A Shakey Graves Day Anthology, an "anthology" of previously unreleased material. On September 15, 2023, Shakey Graves released Movie of the Week through Dualtone. The album featured an innovative digital rollout where fans could use an AI-driven tool on Shakey Graves' website to shuffle unreleased masters and generate their own custom, unique version of the soundtrack.

On May 15, 2026, Shakey Graves released his fifth studio album, Fondness, Etc.

== Discography ==
=== Studio albums ===
List of albums, with selected chart positions
Title	Album details	Peak chart positions				
Title	Album details	US	US Folk	US Indie	US Rock	AUS Hit.
Roll the Bones	Released: January 1, 2011; Re-released: April 2, 2021; Labels: self-released, Dualtone	136 (Note: Roll the Bones charted in USA upon the release of Roll the Bones X in 2021.)	5	21	22	—
And the War Came	Released: October 7, 2014; Label: Dualtone	44	4	8	11	12
Can't Wake Up	Released: May 4, 2018; Label: Dualtone	154	9	13	32	—
Movie of the Week	Released: September 15, 2023; Label: Dualtone	— (Note: Movie of the Week did not enter the US Billboard 200, but peaked at number 48 on the US Top Album Sales Chart.)	—	—	—	—
Fondness, Etc.	Released: May 15, 2026; Label: Secret Identity / Dualtone; Formats: CD, LP, digital download, streaming	—	—	—	—	—
"—" denotes a recording that did not chart or was not released in that territory.

=== Compilation albums ===
List of albums, with selected chart positions
Title	Album details	Peak chart positions		
Title	Album details	US Sales	US Folk	US Indie
Shakey Graves and the Horse He Rode In On	Released: June 30, 2017; Label: Dualtone	85	13	10
Deadstock - A Shakey Graves Day Anthology	Released: February 9, 2023; Label: Self-released	—	—	—
"—" denotes a recording that did not chart or was not released in that territory.

=== EPs ===
- The Donor Blues EP (2012)
- Nobody's Fool (Dualtone, 2015)
- The Sleep EP (2018)
- Night Owl Sessions (2018)
- Look Alive EP (2020)

=== Singles ===
Single	Year	Peak chart positions			Certifications	Album
Single	Year	US AAA	US Rock Air.	CAN Rock	Certifications	Album
"Dearly Departed" (co-written by Esmé Patterson)	2014	5	49	49	RIAA: Gold; MC: Gold	And the War Came
"Tomorrow"	2016	—	—	—	RIAA: Gold	Non-album single
"Kids These Days"	2018	40	—	—		Can't Wake Up
"Mansion Door"	2018	37	—	—		Can't Wake Up
"A World So Full of Love"	2019	—	—	—		Non-album singles
"Cheers"	2021	—	—	—		Non-album singles
"Ready or Not" (featuring Sierra Ferrell)	2023	15	—	—		Movie of the Week
"—" denotes a recording that did not chart or was not released in that territory.

==== As featured artist ====
Single	Year	Album
"This Town" (Trixie Mattel featuring Shakey Graves)	2022	The Blonde & Pink Albums

== Filmography ==
=== Film ===
Year	Title	Role	Notes
2003	Spy Kids 3-D: Game Over	Edog	
2005	Desperate Hippies	Spike	
2006	Open Window	Carlos	
2006	Material Girls	Phone Repairman	
2009	Shorts	John / Boyfriend	
2010	Dance with the One	Skater	
2011	Slacker 2011	Steve	
2012	Somebody Up There Likes Me	Bus Boy #1	
2012	Abel's Field	New Bartender	
2013	Love & Air Sex	Freak Dancing Guy	
2014	Thank You a Lot	Gavin Martinez	
2014	Sin City: A Dame to Kill For	Buzz	
2020	The Get Together	Caleb	
2024	Waterloo Sunset	Sergio	

=== Television ===
Year	Title	Role	Notes
2005	Complete Savages	Boy No. 2	Episode: "Teen Things I Hate About You"
2007	Friday Night Lights	The Swede	4 episodes
2009	Midnight Bayou	Julian Manet	Television film
2012	Dallas	Eric	2 episodes
