= Uncivilized Area =

Studio album by The Disco Biscuits
- Released: May 19, 1998
- Studio: Groundhog Studios, Holland, Pennsylvania
- Genre: Trance fusion
- Length: 71:55
- Label: Megaforce Records
- Producer: Rob Hunter

The Disco Biscuits chronology
Encephalous Crime (1996)	Uncivilized Area (1998)	They Missed the Perfume (2001)

Professional ratings
Review scores
Source	Rating
AllMusic	2.5/5 stars

Uncivilized Area is an album by the trance fusion band the Disco Biscuits. It was released in 1998 on Megaforce Records.

The album was among the earliest examples of "trance fusion" or "livetronica," a mixture of electronic music and traditional jam band music.

== Critical reception ==
Dean Budnick, in his book Jambands: The Complete Guide to the Players, Music, & Scene, gave the album a 4-star review, calling it "one of the most influential discs within these pages."

== Track listing ==
No.	Title	Writer(s)	Length
1.	"Vassillios"	Jon Gutwillig	6:18
2.	"Aceetobee"	Gutwillig	10:55
3.	"Jamillia"	Marc Brownstein	7:39
4.	"Little Betty Boop"	Gutwillig	15:11
5.	"M.E.M.P.H.I.S."	Brownstein	4:59
6.	"Morph Dusseldorf"	Brownstein	7:56
7.	"I-Man"	Gutwillig	13:13
8.	"Awol's Blues"	Gutwillig	5:44

== Personnel ==
The Disco Biscuits

- Jon Gutwillig – guitar & vocals
- Aron Magner – keys & vocals
- Marc Brownstein – bass & vocals
- Sam Altman – drums & vocals

Production

- Rob "Wacko" Hunter – producer, engineer, mixer
- Jon Zazula – executive producer
- Marsha Zazula – executive producer
- Gary King – mastering
- Jon Lesser – live sound engineer
- Kevin "Radar" Cunningham – booklet art & design
- Layout – Sam Altman
- Layout – Ian R. Brand
