= Encephalous Crime =

Studio album by The Disco Biscuits
- Released: January 2, 1996
- Recorded: 3rd Story Recording Philadelphia PA
- Genre: Trance fusion
- Length: 64:02
- Label: Self-recorded
- Producer: The Disco Biscuits, Scotty Herzog

The Disco Biscuits chronology
Encephalous Crime (1996)	Uncivilized Area (1998)

Professional ratings
Review scores
Source	Rating
Allmusic	2/5 stars

Encephalous Crime is the first album by trance fusion band The Disco Biscuits. It was self-released in 1996.

== Track listing ==
No.	Title	Writer(s)	Length
1.	"Mr. Don"	Jon Gutwillig	6:17
2.	"Rainbow Song"	Marc Brownstein	3:35
3.	"Stone"	Gutwillig, Matt O'Brien	3:32
4.	"The Devil's Waltz"	Gutwillig	4:34
5.	"El Camino del Gordissimo (S.O.B.P. Interlude)"	Sam Altman	0:24
6.	"Radiator"	Brownstein	5:41
7.	"Trooper McCue"	Brownstein	5:13
8.	"Pat and Dex"	Brownstein, Gutwillig, Ben Hayflick	8:11
9.	"Barfly"	Gutwillig, A. Braff	4:44
10.	"Pygmy Twylyte" (Live 08-07-96)	Frank Zappa	7:00
11.	"Basis for a Day" (Live 08-07-96)	Gutwillig, Kevin Abrams	14:51

== Personnel ==
The Disco Biscuits

- Jon "Barber" Gutwillig – guitar, vocals
- Aron Magner – piano, organ, keyboards, vocals
- Marc Brownstein – bass, vocals
- Sam Altman – drums, percussion

Additional musicians

- Nadirah Baba – backing vocals (1, 2, 6, 7, 8)
- Nia Bey Al-Rasul – backing vocals (1, 2, 6, 7, 8)
- Anita Barnes Cauthorn – backing vocals (1)
- Elliot Levin – flute, soprano saxophone, alto saxophone (3)

Production

- The Disco Biscuits – producer, mixer
- Scotty Herzog – producer, recording engineer, mixer
- Mark Sarisky – recording engineer, mixer
- Mike Goldstein – executive producer
- Layla Revis – photography
