= Can't Wake Up =

Studio album by Shakey Graves
- Released: May 4, 2018
- Length: 52:40
- Label: Dualtone

Shakey Graves chronology
Nobody's Fool (2015)	Can't Wake Up (2018)

Professional ratings
Aggregate scores
Source	Rating
Metacritic	82/100
Review scores
Source	Rating
AllMusic	3.5/5 stars

Can't Wake Up is the fifth studio album by American musician Shakey Graves. It was released in May 2018 under Dualtone Records.

== Track listing ==
No.	Title	Length
1.	"Counting Sheep"	4:55
2.	"Kids These Days"	3:42
3.	"Climb on the Cross"	4:08
4.	"Dining Alone"	4:05
5.	"My Neighbor"	3:07
6.	"Excuses"	4:17
7.	"Cops and Robbers"	3:28
8.	"Mansion Door"	4:30
9.	"Aibohphobia"	3:53
10.	"Big Bad Wolf"	3:16
11.	"Backseat Driver"	4:30
12.	"Foot of Your Bed"	4:25
13.	"Tin Man"	4:24

== Charts ==
Chart (2018)	Peak position
US Billboard 200	154
US Top Rock Albums (Billboard)	32
US Top Alternative Albums (Billboard)	15
US Folk Albums (Billboard)	9
