= Disco Biscuits =

American jam band

The Disco Biscuits
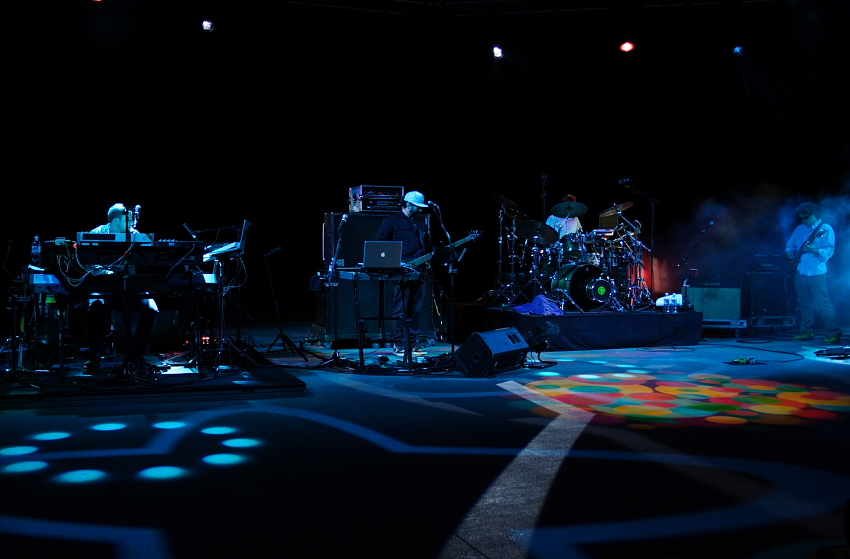
- The Disco Biscuits performing at Red Rocks Amphitheatre 2010

Background information
- Origin: Philadelphia, Pennsylvania, U.S.
- Genres: Trancefusion; Livetronica; Psytrance; Jam band
- Years active: 1995–present
- Label: Independent Label Group/Megaforce Records
- Members: Marc Brownstein; Aron Magner; Jon Gutwillig; Marlon B. Lewis
- Past members: Sam Altman; Allen Aucoin
- Website: discobiscuits.com

The Disco Biscuits are an American jam band from Philadelphia. The band consists of Marc "Brownie" Brownstein (bass guitar, vocals), Jon "The Barber" Gutwillig (guitar, vocals), Aron Magner (keyboards, synths, vocals), and Marlon B. Lewis (drums). The band incorporates elements from a variety of musical genres with a base of electronic and rock. Their style has been described as trance fusion.

== History ==
The Disco Biscuits formed in 1995 at the University of Pennsylvania. Brownstein, Gutwillig, Magner, and the original drummer, Sam "Sammy" Altman, bonded over a shared affinity for psychedelic rock, electronic music, soul, blues, jazz and classical music. This eclectic mix of interests helped inspire their style of live electronic music, which is sometimes called 'trance fusion'. The term references the band's choice to incorporate elements of trance music - specifically the driving, rhythmically repetitive drum beats and melodic sections that repeat and evolve over time - into the instrumentation and conventions of a live jamband where guitar, bass, keyboards, and drums play structured songs with sections for exploratory improvisation.

The band honed their style while playing at bars and fraternity-house shows in the Philadelphia area in the mid-1990s. Bassist Marc Brownstein credits the improvisational ingenuity demonstrated by the jamband Phish during the 95-97 tours as a particular inspiration for the Disco Biscuits' sound.

The first inklings of what ultimately became trance-fusion emerged during shows played by the band shortly after keyboardist Aron Magner incorporated a Roland JP-8000 into his live setup in late 1997. This analog-modeling synthesizer supplied sounds that lent a distinctly electronic flavor to jams that were in most other ways typical Phish-inspired blues-rock improvisations.

In 2005 drummer Sammy Altman left the band to pursue a career in medicine. The band began a search for their next drummer ending with a two-night, sold-out drum-off concert at the Borgata's Music Box in Atlantic City. In December 2005 Allen Aucoin was announced as the new member of the band. Aucoin knew members of the Biscuits' road crew and had opened for the Biscuits with his previous band, Skydog Gypsy, in the past. In 2006 the band purchased the Old City Philadelphia studio space that had previously belonged to DJ Jazzy Jeff. The space became a place for local musicians to congregate and work, culminating in the collaborations recorded in recording studio efforts known as the Planet Anthem sessions. Around the time Planet Anthem was released, the Biscuits also collaborated with hip-hop producer Damon Dash working on a variety of projects.

The band has created live, improvised scores to films on occasions throughout their career, including Akira in 1999, Tron in 2015, The Fifth Element in 2023, and 2001 A Space Odyssey in 2024.

=== Lineup change (2025) ===
In October 2025, drummer Allen Aucoin departed The Disco Biscuits after more than twenty years with the band. In a statement released jointly by Jon Gutwillig, Marc Brownstein, and Aron Magner, the group said that the decision "came after many years of reflection, conversations, and attempts to work through challenges," emphasizing that it was "not financially driven" but related to "communication, creative direction, and the ability to connect on and off stage". The statement also noted the band's appreciation for Aucoin's contributions over more than a thousand shows and announced that Marlon B. Lewis would join as drummer for the remainder of the year, with all tour dates moving forward as planned.

Aucoin released his own statement confirming his departure, writing, "After 20 incredible years with The Disco Biscuits, the band is moving forward without me." He added that while there were "multiple reasons for this decision by the band," it was "not solely financially driven". Aucoin thanked fans, crew, and bandmates for two decades of touring and recording, saying he remained "deeply grateful".

== Camp Bisco ==
Camp Bisco
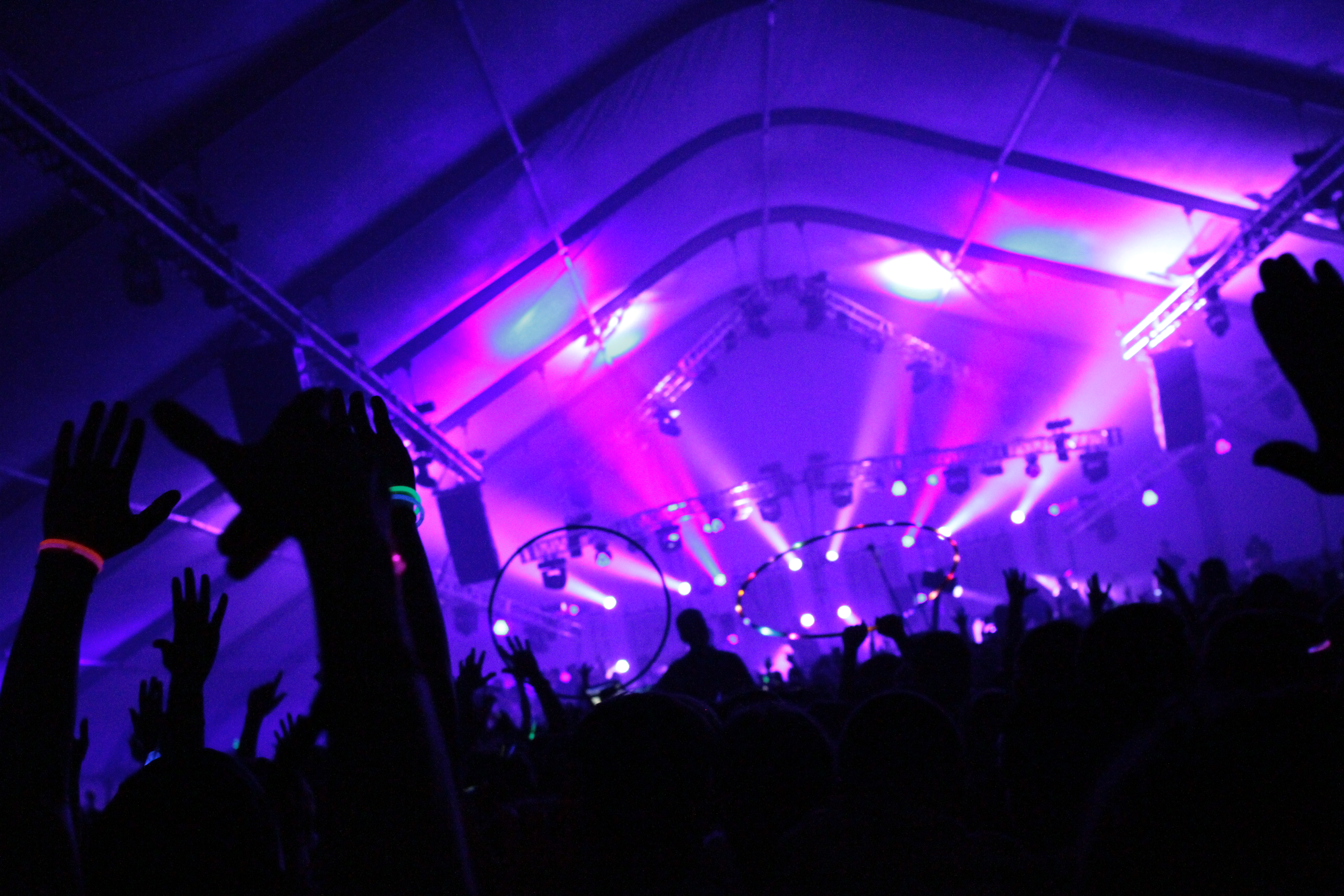
- Genre: Electronic music,
- Locations: Indian Lookout Country Club in upstate New York, Montage Mountain in Scranton PA
- Years active: 1999-2021
- Founders: The Disco Biscuits

The first Camp Bisco took place in August 1999 in Cherrytree Township, Pennsylvania, with the band seeking to combine the creative effects of electronic DJs with improvisational rock. Camp Bisco grew over its 17 years of festivities, with the lineup expanding to include acts such as Shpongle, Lotus, Pretty Lights, Bassnectar, Gramatik, and STS9. The band celebrated the fifteenth anniversary of the festival during July 2017 at Montage Mountain in Scranton, Pennsylvania.

Camp Bisco was canceled in 2020 due to the COVID-19 pandemic. The band participated in the drive-in "Pavement Rave" concert series at the same venue as a replacement event. The 2021 festival was also canceled, citing that it could not be organized in time without compromising the experience. Two concert dates in Philadelphia were organized as a replacement, headlined by the band and Lotus.

== Biscoland (2023–2024) ==
Biscoland is a festival-style event curated and hosted by the band The Disco Biscuits, held at Wonderland Forest in LaFayette, New York. The festival ran for two consecutive years, 2023 and 2024, and marked the band’s return to large-scale festival production following earlier events such as Camp Bisco and City Bisco.

=== History and format ===
The inaugural Biscoland took place on October 6–7, 2023, as a two-day event at Wonderland Forest. The venue, described by organizers as being set amid “the rolling hills of Central New York’s Apple Valley,” offered fans a camping-based festival featuring performances surrounded by forest and natural scenery. The 2023 lineup featured four sets by The Disco Biscuits, two sets by Lotus, and appearances by Emancipator, Papadosio, Sunsquabi, The Floozies, Eggy, and Spaga Plays Dead (Aron Magner’s side project). In 2024, Biscoland returned for an expanded three-day event from July 4–6, shifting from autumn to Independence Day weekend. The 2024 event again featured four sets by The Disco Biscuits, along with a performance by their improvisational alter-ego act, Tractorbeam. The lineup included Lettuce, Nora En Pure, Break Science, Kitchen Dwellers, Manic Focus, and RAQ. The 2024 event also featured extended improvisational performances, including the debut of a 33-minute version of “Another Spin” and other new material.

== Rock operas ==
Brownstein and Gutwillig have each written rock operas. Gutwillig was first, writing the Hot Air Balloon sometime before it debuted on December 31, 1998, at Silk City in Philadelphia. Brownstein wrote the Chemical Warfare Brigade in early 2000 while on hiatus from the band. It debuted at the Trocadero Theater in Philadelphia on August 19, 2000 along with his side project Electron. The Disco Biscuits played the Chemical Warfare Brigade for the first time at the Vanderbilt in Plainview, New York on December 30, 2000. In 2022 the band begun to debut parts of a third opera entitled Revolution in Motion which was released March 29, 2024.

== Philanthropy ==
The Disco Biscuits are involved in a number of charitable efforts including food drives and raising money for hurricane relief. In 2004, Brownstein (along with Andy Bernstein, author of The Pharmer's Almanac) founded HeadCount, a national, nonpartisan, non-profit, organization that partners with musicians to promote participation in democracy in the United States by registering voters at concerts. In 2010, the keyboardist Aron Magner was named to the Board of Directors for the Philadelphia Young Playwrights theatre arts program.

== Band members ==
Current members

- Jon Gutwillig – guitar, vocals
- Marc Brownstein – bass, vocals
- Aron Magner – keyboards, vocals
- Marlon Lewis – drums

Former members

- Sam Altman – drums (1995–2005)
- Allen Aucoin – drums (2005–2025)

== Discography ==
=== Studio albums ===
List of studio albums
Title	Details
Encephalous Crime	Released: January 2, 1996; Label: self-released
Uncivilized Area	Released: May 19, 1998; Label: Megaforce Records
They Missed the Perfume	Released: April 3, 2001; Label: Megaforce Records
Señor Boombox	Released: September 17, 2002; Label: Megaforce Records
Planet Anthem	Released: February 2, 2010; Label: Diamond Riggs Records; US #157 Heatseekers #5
Otherwise Law Abiding Citizens	Released: July 7, 2011; Label: Diamond Riggs Records
Revolution in Motion	Released: March 29, 2024; Label: Megaforce Records

=== Other albums ===
- Bisco Lives (2000)
- Bisco Lives 2: Freedom Boulevard (2002)
- Trance Fusion Radio Broadcast Vol. 1-4 (2003)
- Under the Influence: A Jam Band Tribute to Lynyrd Skynyrd (2004)
- The Wind at Four to Fly (2006)
- Rocket 3 (11/14/2006)
- On Time EP (10/29/2009)
- Widgets EP (11/18/2009)
- The Classical Set (11/24/2014)
- Another Plan of Attack EP (12/09/2022)
- Shocked (02/03/2023)
- Live From Austin, TX (September 16, 2023) (2023)
- Revolution in Motion, Pt. 1 EP (01/19/2024)

== Filmography ==
- Live at the Palladium (2004)
- Camp Bisco IV (2005)
- Jam in the Dam (2006)
- Progressions (2007)
- Bisco Inferno 09/10 (2011)

== See also ==
- List of electronic music festivals
- List of jam band music festivals
