= Dead Winter Carpenters =

American alternative country band

- Origin: Lake Tahoe, California, United States
- Genres: Alternative country; Americana; progressive bluegrass; roots rock; jam band
- Years active: 2010–present
- Label: Independent
- Members: Jenni Charles; Jesse Dunn; Dave Lockhart; Bryan Daines; Brian Huston
- Past members: Ryan Davis; Sean Duerr; Justin Kruger
- Website: deadwintercarpenters.com

Dead Winter Carpenters is a five-piece alternative country band from North Lake Tahoe, California, whose music has been described as an Americana blend of progressive bluegrass, roots rock, and folk with an influence from the Bakersfield Sound. They have performed at prominent venues such as The Fillmore and Great American Music Hall in San Francisco, the Fox Theater in Boulder, Colorado, and the Variety Playhouse in Atlanta, Georgia, as well as playing notable music festivals like High Sierra in California, YarmonyGrass in Colorado, the Northwest String Summit in Oregon, and the Summer Meltdown in Washington. They have also appeared on stage with the likes of Yonder Mountain String Band, Railroad Earth, The Infamous Stringdusters, Sam Bush, The Travelin' McCourys, and Chris Shiflett.

== Members ==
- Jenni Charles - fiddle, vocals
- Jesse Dunn - rhythm guitar, vocals
- Dave Lockhart - upright and electric bass, vocals
- Bryan Daines - lead guitar, vocals
- Brian Huston - drums, vocals

Past Members

- Ryan Davis, Sean Duerr, Justin Kruger

== History ==
The band consists of members of three previous Northern California bands. Jesse Dunn, Sean Duerr, and Dave Lockhart played in the Montana Slim String Band, while Jenni Charles and Ryan Davis were from both The Rusty Strings and Truckee Tribe. After meeting at a music festival during the previous summer, they began playing some informal shows together in November 2009. The opportunity to play before a larger audience came in March 2010 as the after party band of a Yonder Mountain String Band show at the Crystal Bay Club in Lake Tahoe. This was their first show billed as Dead Winter Carpenters.

During a summer of touring the western United States, the band paused for three days to record their first studio album. The self-titled "D.W.C.," released in August 2010, was followed by a larger tour that covered 22 states in 35 days.

Over the course of 2011, the band played over 175 shows and performed at High Sierra Music Festival and Hangtown Halloween Ball. The increased exposure led to a successful Kickstarter campaign for a new album. The $12,000 in funding allowed the band to improve their productions values and take a more relaxed approach to the project. The recording session took place in January 2012 at Prairie Sun Recording Studios with Chief Engineer Matt Wright, while the mastering was performed by famed engineer, John Cuniberti. Released in May 2012, "Ain't It Strange" was followed by several national tours, including opening slots for The Infamous Stringdusters and Yonder Mountain String Band. The band also performed at YarmonyGrass and The Northwest String Summit, in addition to a second High Sierra.

Heading into 2013, the band saw the departure of drummer Ryan Davis and lead guitarist Sean Duerr. Replacing the respective instruments, the band brought in Justin Kruger and Bryan Daines, both graduates of the University of Nevada, Reno's music program. Touring continued, albeit at a slower pace as the band worked in the new members. The spring was highlighted by the opportunity to play at the famed San Francisco venue, The Fillmore, supporting for Railroad Earth. By the summer, the drummer was again replaced, this time with Brian Huston. This lineup went into the studio in the latter half of the year, recording at the new Heavenly Tracks studio in South Lake Tahoe, CA. Matt Wright and John Cuniberti again provided engineering and mastering services. The six track EP, "Dirt Nap," reflected the alt-country directions the new lineup was headed in as they "slowly soft-pedaled their jam influences, tightened the songcraft and continued to sharpen their harmonies." It was released in January 2014 as a free/pay what you want download on Bandcamp.

== Discography ==
Year	Title	Label
2010	D.W.C.	Independent
2012	Ain't It Strange	Independent
2014	Dirt Nap - EP	Independent
