= Cervantes' Masterpiece Ballroom =

Concert venue in Denver, Colorado

Coordinates: 39°45′16″N 104°58′43″W

- Cervantes’ Ballroom, Cervantes’ Other Side, The Other Side
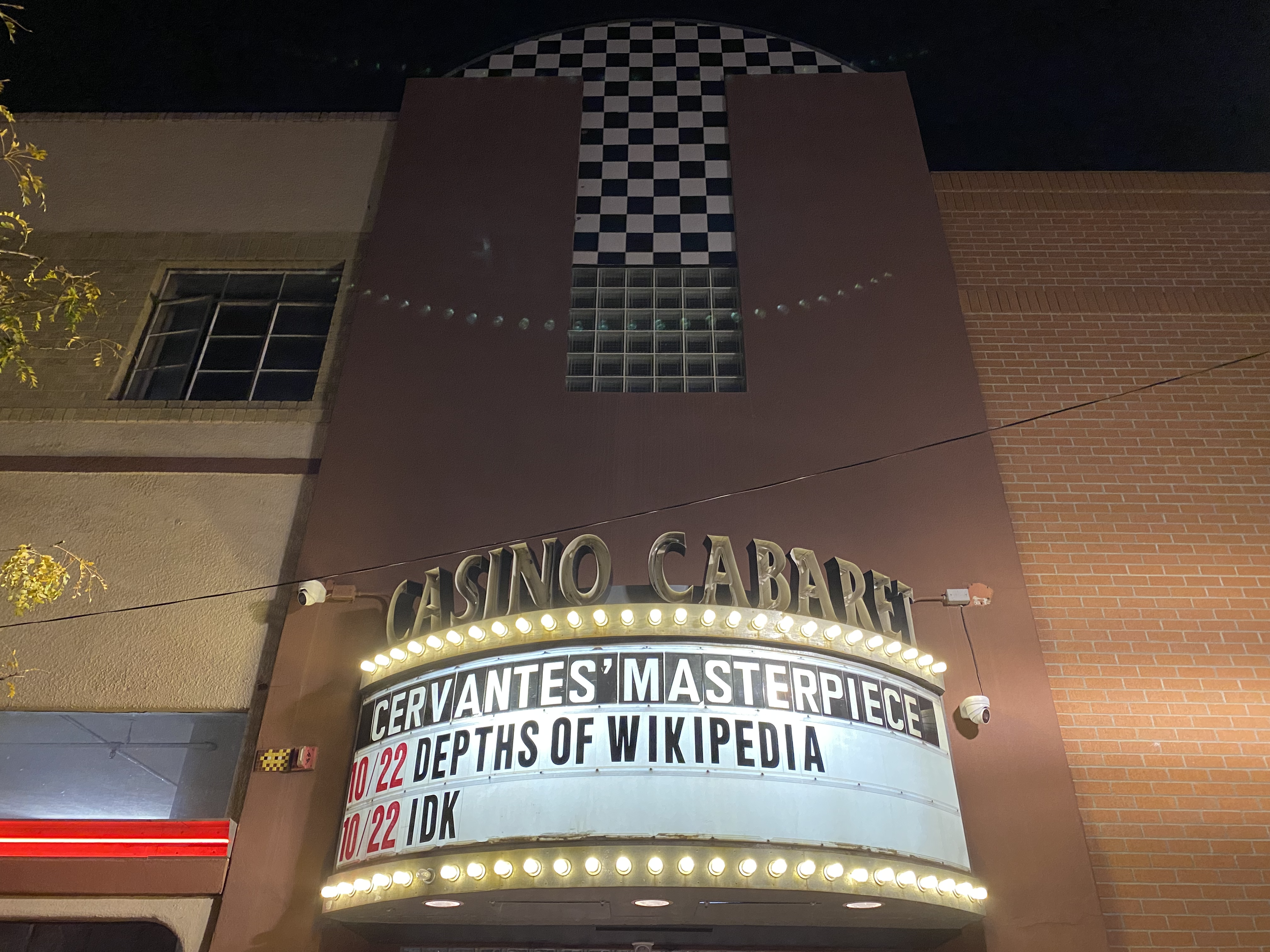
- Venue marquee from the Welton Street entrance, 2023
- Interactive map of Cervantes' Masterpiece Ballroom
- Former names: Casino Ballroom, Casino Cabaret, Club Pure
- Address: 2637 Welton Street; Denver, CO 80205
- Location: Five Points
- Owner: Duncan Goodman, Diana Azab

Construction
- Opened: Mid-1920s
- Renovated: 2003

Website
- https://cervantesmasterpiece.com/

Cervantes' Masterpiece Ballroom is an independent live music venue in Denver, Colorado, with two rooms (Cervantes’ Ballroom and Cervantes’ Other Side) that offer live music and events simultaneously. It is located in Denvers' historic Five Points neighborhood. It was originally a live jazz venue by Benny Hooper called the Ex-Servicemen's Club.

== History ==
Over the years, the venue hosted famous musicians like Duke Ellington, Count Basie, Benny Goodman, B.B. King, Ray Charles and Ike and Tina Turner, and many more.

Renovated in 2003, Cervantes' is known for featuring dubstep, electronica, hip-hop acts and DJs, along with bluegrass and jam-centric bands. More recent artists include the likes of Gov't Mule's Warren Haynes, Phish's Page McConnell, and Branford Marsalis, to name a few.

Recent renovations were not without controversy. In particular, the Casino Cabaret's famous glass doorway was demolished, which led to pushback from community advocates. However, the iconic glass door entrance was restored in partnership with the Denver Landmark Preservation, while retaining the change from one doors to two.
