= Señor Boombox =

Studio album by The Disco Biscuits
- Released: 2002
- Genre: Trance fusion
- Label: Megaforce Records

Professional ratings
Review scores
Source	Rating
AllMusic	2.5/5 stars
Rolling Stone	3/5 stars

Señor Boombox (2002) is an album by Disco Biscuits.

The album charted on two Billboard lists: Top Electronic Albums at #13 and Top Independent Albums at #46.

== Track listing ==
1. "Hope" (Jon Gutwillig, David Murray) – 4:35
2. "Float Like a Butterfly" (Sam Altman, Marc Brownstein, Gutwillig, Aron Magner, E.D. Clay) – 4:27
3. "In the Sky" (Brownstein) – 0:46
4. "Floodlights" (Brownstein) – 2:40
5. "Jigsaw Earth" (Gutwillig, Dan Glimcher) – 7:15
6. "Sugarcane" (Altman, Brownstein, Gutwillig, Magner, Audley Freed)– 1:08
7. "Sound One" (Altman) – 3:30
8. "The Tunnel" (Brownstein, Jerry Goldsmith) – 7:46
9. "Sprawl" (Altman, Brownstein, Gutwillig, Magner) – 0:29
10. "Floes" (Altman) – 7:24
11. "Triumph" (Brownstein) – 3:33
12. "Hope II" (Jon Gutwillig, David Murray) – 4:15
13. "Hope III" (Jon Gutwillig, David Murray) – 15:37
