= Sweet Lillies =

American bluegrass/American band

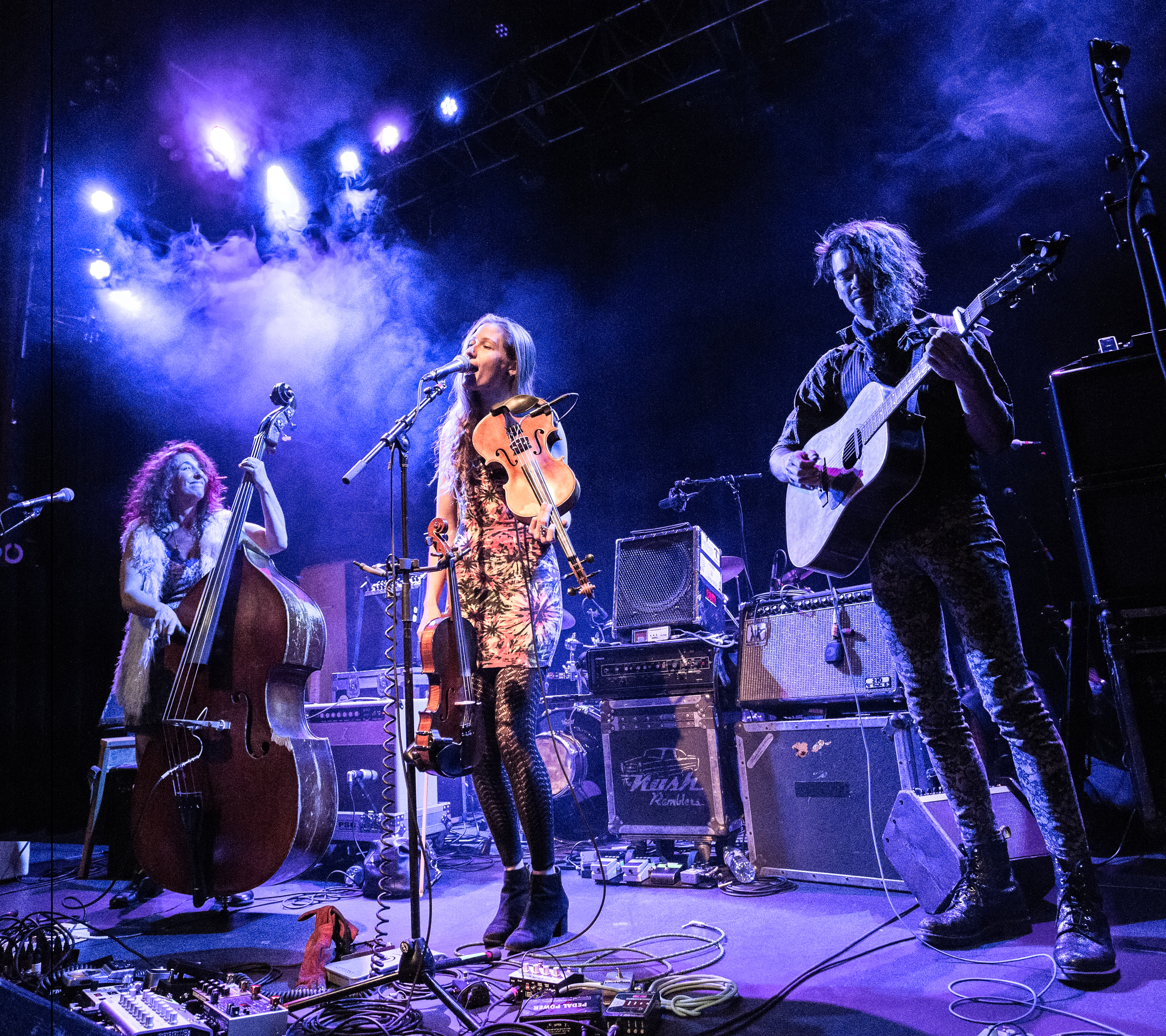
- Sweet Lillies live 2020

Background information
- Origin: Boulder, Colorado
- Genres: Americana, bluegrass
- Years active: 2014-present
- Members: Becca Bisque; Julie Gussaroff; Jones Maynard; Dustin Rohleder
- Past members: Danjo Birnberg; Melly Sponselee
- Website: www.sweetlillies.com

The Sweet Lillies are an Americana/bluegrass band from Boulder, Colorado

== History ==
The Sweet Lillies formed in 2013 when classically trained vocalist Julie Gussaroff met classically trained violist Becca Bisque at a bluegrass jam in Golden, Colorado. The two wished to start a band, Gussaroff said, would be "a female vocally led group with high-level instrumentation and original songwriting." They added Danjo Lynn Birnberng in 2014 and Melly Frances Sponselee in 2016 to complete the lineup and released their debut, self-titled album in 2016.

Birnberg left the band in 2017, and the Sweet Lillies continued as a trio. They recorded their second album, A Lighter Hue, produced by Leftover Salmon's Vince Herman the following year. Following the release of A Lighter Hue, the band added guitarist Dustin Rohleder. Rohleder had first met the Sweet Lillies in 2017 at the Hangtown Festival when they crossed paths at a campground jam. "The three of us played in the campground for eleven hours straight," says Gusssaroff. "It was incredibly wild." Sponselee left the band the following year in 2019.

The band entered the studio in early 2020 to begin working on their next album, Common Ground with producer Tim Carbone from Railroad Earth. They will release the album in 2021.

== Discography ==
- Sweet Lillies - 2016
- A Lighter Hue - 2018
- Common Ground - 2021
- Equality - 2023
- Cover to Cover - 2024
