= Paper Bird =

American indie folk band

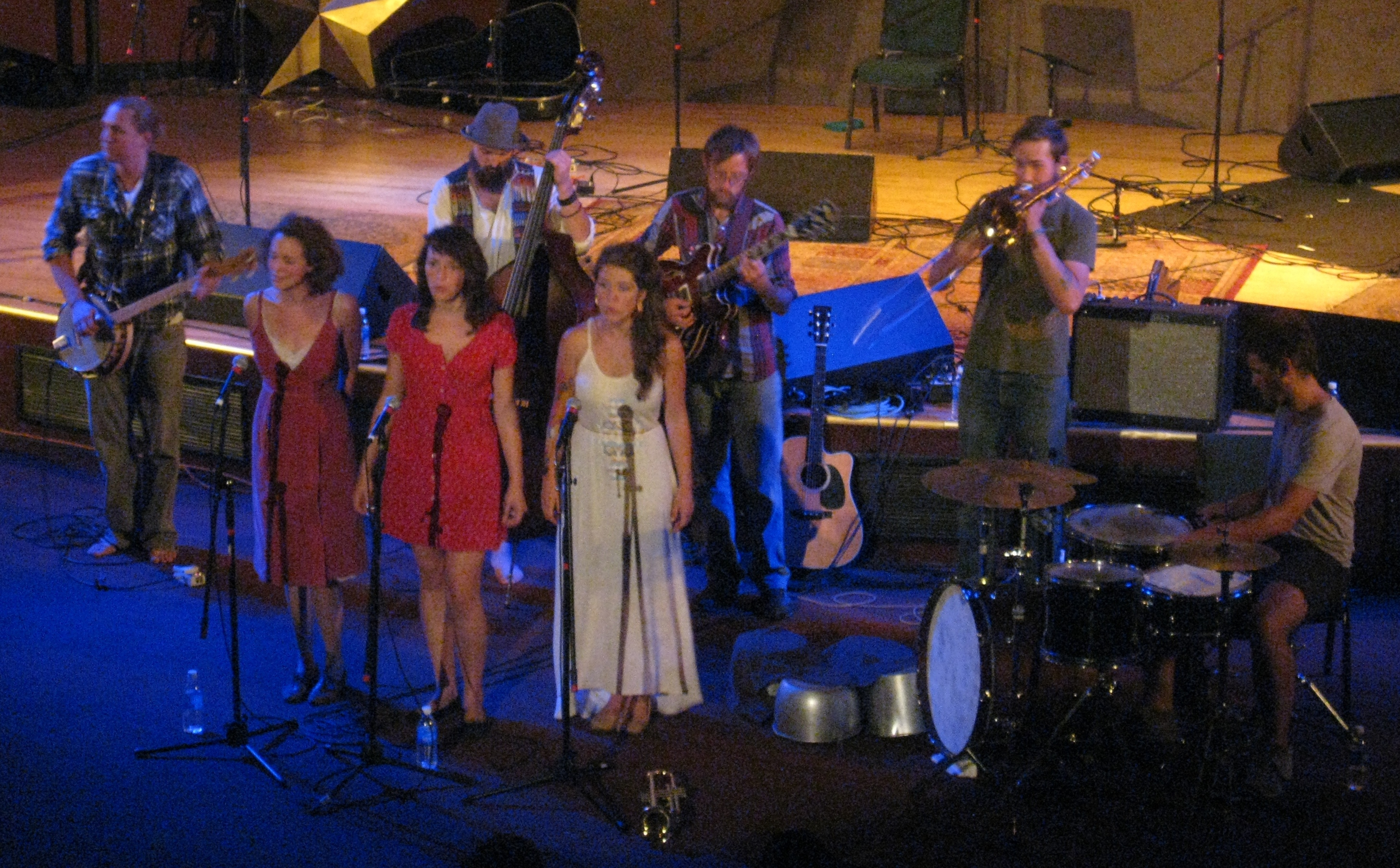
- Performing in Colorado Springs in 2011

Background information
- Origin: Denver, Colorado, U.S.
- Genres: Folk, indie
- Years active: 2007–2017
- Label: Thirty Tigers
- Members: Sarah Anderson; Carleigh Aikins; Mark Anderson; Caleb Summeril; Paul DeHaven
- Past members: Esmé Patterson; Macon Terry; Tyler Archuletta; Genny Patterson
- Website: www.paperbirdband.com

Paper Bird was an American six-piece indie folk band based in Denver. The band was composed of Carleigh Aikins (vocals), brother and sister Mark (drums) and Sarah Anderson (vocals, cornet, trumpet), Paul DeHaven (guitar), and Caleb Summeril (bass, banjo, guitar, harmonica).

== History ==
Paper Bird formed in 2006, and their self-released first album, Anything Nameless and Joymaking, appeared in 2007. In the summer of 2008, Paper Bird went on their first national tour with New Belgium Brewery's "Tour de Fat". On their East Coast tour, they had numerous sold-out venues, including some in Philadelphia and New York City. They were successful locally and were voted "top band" by 5280 magazine, as well as one of the top ten best bands by the Denver Post. On June 24, 2009, Paper Bird's first EP titled "A Sky Underground" was released, followed by a summer tour which included stops at High Sierra Music Festival, Oregon Country Fair, Mile High Music Festival and 10,000 Lakes Festival.

Paper Bird shared the stage with Hall & Oates, Edward Sharpe and the Magnetic Zeros, Nathaniel Rateliff, Neko Case, DeVotchKa, the Lumineers and others. The EP A Sky Underground was picked up and re-released digitally April 2010 by Park The Van Records. and the live EP Live at Twist & Shout. In July 2010, the band again self-released their second full-length album When the River Took Flight.

In the fall of 2010, Paper Bird began working with Ballet Nouveau Colorado. The band composed the music for a ballet entitled Carry On. Their music was then combined with the choreography and films by Garrett Ammon, it thus became a multi-media performance which debuted at the Lakewood Cultural Center on February 4, 2011, and was played to sold-out houses in February. Carry On was released as a full-length, two-act live album on June 11, 2011. They recorded it live onstage with the ballerinas. Paper Bird hired Mark Anderson and Stelth Ulvang to perform the ballet. Anderson was inducted to the band's roster after the ballet.

In September 2012, the band released a remix album entitled Carry On RMXD: Paper Bird Reimagined. It is an eclectic and electronic exploration of their typically organic sound.

After touring in 2012, Paper Bird returned to the studio to craft their fourth full-length album, Rooms, released March 26, 2013. Produced by William Ryan Fritch, Rooms was written in October/November 2012 and recorded at Mighty Fine Audio in Denver in December. It is their first recording without a trombone, and with Mark Anderson's percussion playing a greater role.

The band toured extensively throughout North America in 2013 and 2014 and, in-mid 2014, parted ways with vocalist Esmé Patterson. Toronto-based singer Carleigh Aikins (Bahamas, Foxjaws) joined Paper Bird. Their fifth record was produced by John Oates and recorded at Addiction Studios in Nashville.

In 2017, the band broke up, as its members all decided it was time to pursue other projects.

== Musical style ==
Paper Bird was a five-piece band composed of three female lead vocals, guitar, bass, and drums. Unlike most bands, which tend to play exclusively four-beat or three-beat, they often played in odd meters, such as seven-beat and five-beat. Having three lead singers allowed them to have rich multi-part vocal harmonies. While their sound has been described as "vintage" and "timeless", their sound evolved significantly after the band's inception. Paper Bird focused on the vocal harmonies of their music, which have been described as "velvety and sweet". Rooms found them digging deeper into their influences: gospel, soul, rock and roll, shoe-gaze, African rhythms, indie pop, folk, R&B, and jazz.

== Albums ==
- Anything Nameless and Joymaking (2007 - self released)
- A Sky Underground (2009 - self released) (2010 - Park The Van Records)
- Live at Twist and Shout (2009 - Twist & Shout Records)
- When the River Took Flight (2010 - self released)
- Carry On (2011 - self released)
- Carry On RMXD: (Paper Bird Reimagined) (2012 - self released)
- Rooms (2013 - self released)
- Paper Bird (2016 - Thirty Tigers/Sons of Thunder)
