= Mishawaka Amphitheatre =

Concert venue in Fort Collins, Colorado, US

Coordinates: 40°41′15″N 105°21′57″W

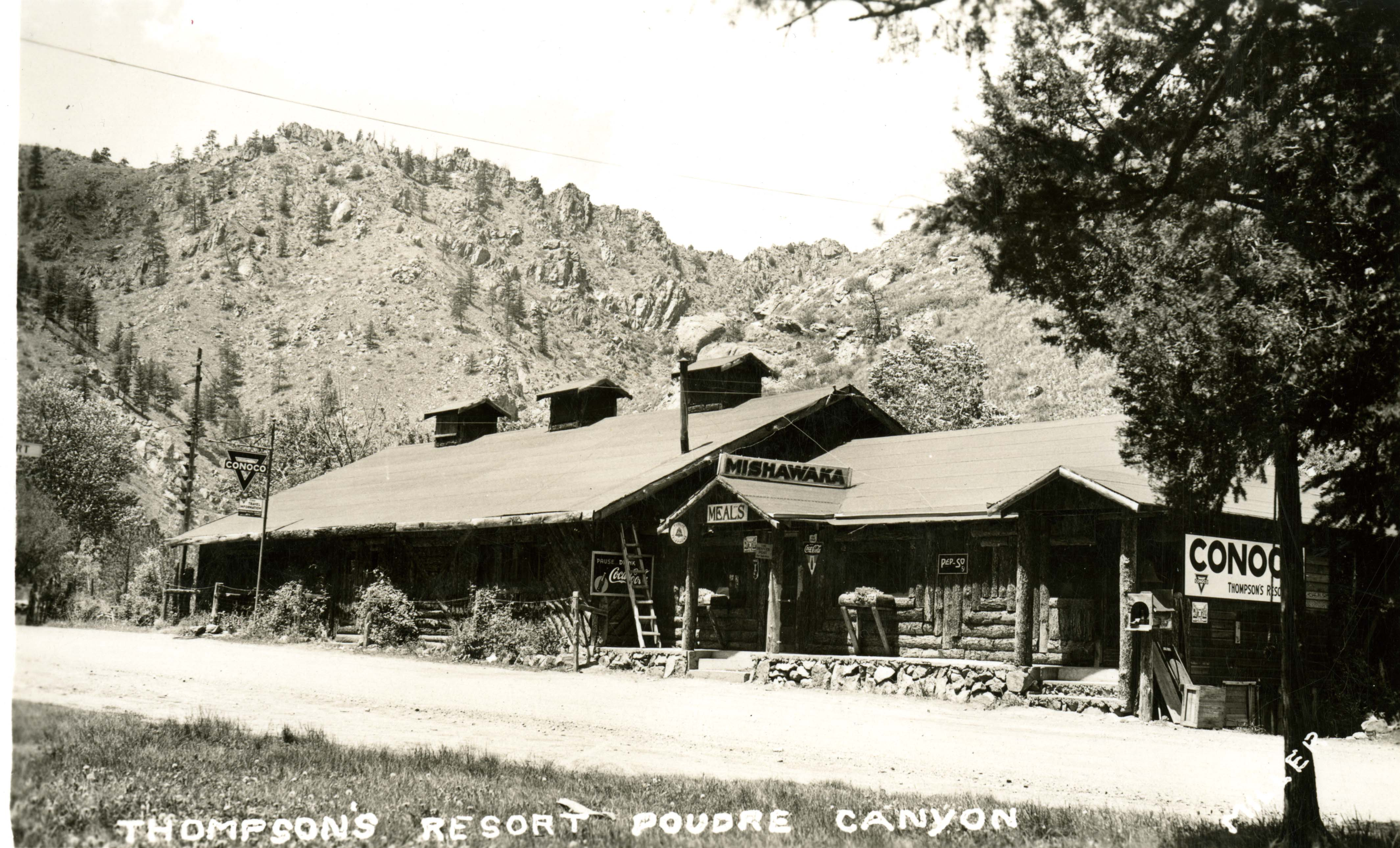
The Mishawaka, circa 1921

The Mishawaka Amphitheatre is an American single stage 1000 person outdoor concert venue located approximately 25 mi (40 km) northwest of Fort Collins, Colorado, on Colorado State Highway 14. It is on the banks of the Poudre River. The restaurant is open year-round and the amphitheatre is open from May to September.

The Mishawaka celebrated its 100th anniversary in 2016 and is currently owned by Dani Grant, who bought it in 2010 from Robin Jones. Jones bought it in 1991 "to keep it from being torn down and turned into a parking lot," but was forced to sell it after being caught with 280 lb (130 kg) of marijuana. Nevertheless, Jones wanted to sell the venue to "someone who would keep it a musical amphitheatre." Before taking ownership of the amphitheatre, Grant ran an artist non-profit that worked to bring musicians to places like Mishawaka. After buying the property Grant worked on fixing up the place, she updated the electrical system, renovated the outdoor deck, and upgraded the kitchen.

== History ==
The Mishawaka was founded in 1916 by Walter Thompson, who was a musician and musical teacher. The Mishawaka was an outpost of Fort Collins and included a dance hall whose focus was music. The Thompson family provided all the music for the dances.

The Mishawaka used to be known as Thompson's Resort. Walter Thompson, who found the site while on a motorcycle trip, was a piano tuner from Denver. The Resort had six cabins to rent and a store. In the mid-1950s, Thompson began to have health issues and sold the business.

One of the next owners of Mishwaka, Jim Corr, a former Colorado State University student, built the balcony that overhangs the Poudre River. He started to manage the place in 1974.

Robin Jones bought the property in 1992 for $175,000.

== Restaurant ==
The Mishawaka has a full restaurant and bar with seating that overlooks the Poudre Canyon and river. They offer casual American-style food like burgers and sandwiches, pub-style items such as fish & chips, reuben sandwiches, salads, and other appetizers. Additionally, they have vegetarian-friendly options on their menu.

They serve a full bar with local craft beers, including brews from Odell Brewery, and wines from The OCB Wine Project, they also have some crafted non alcoholic cocktails.

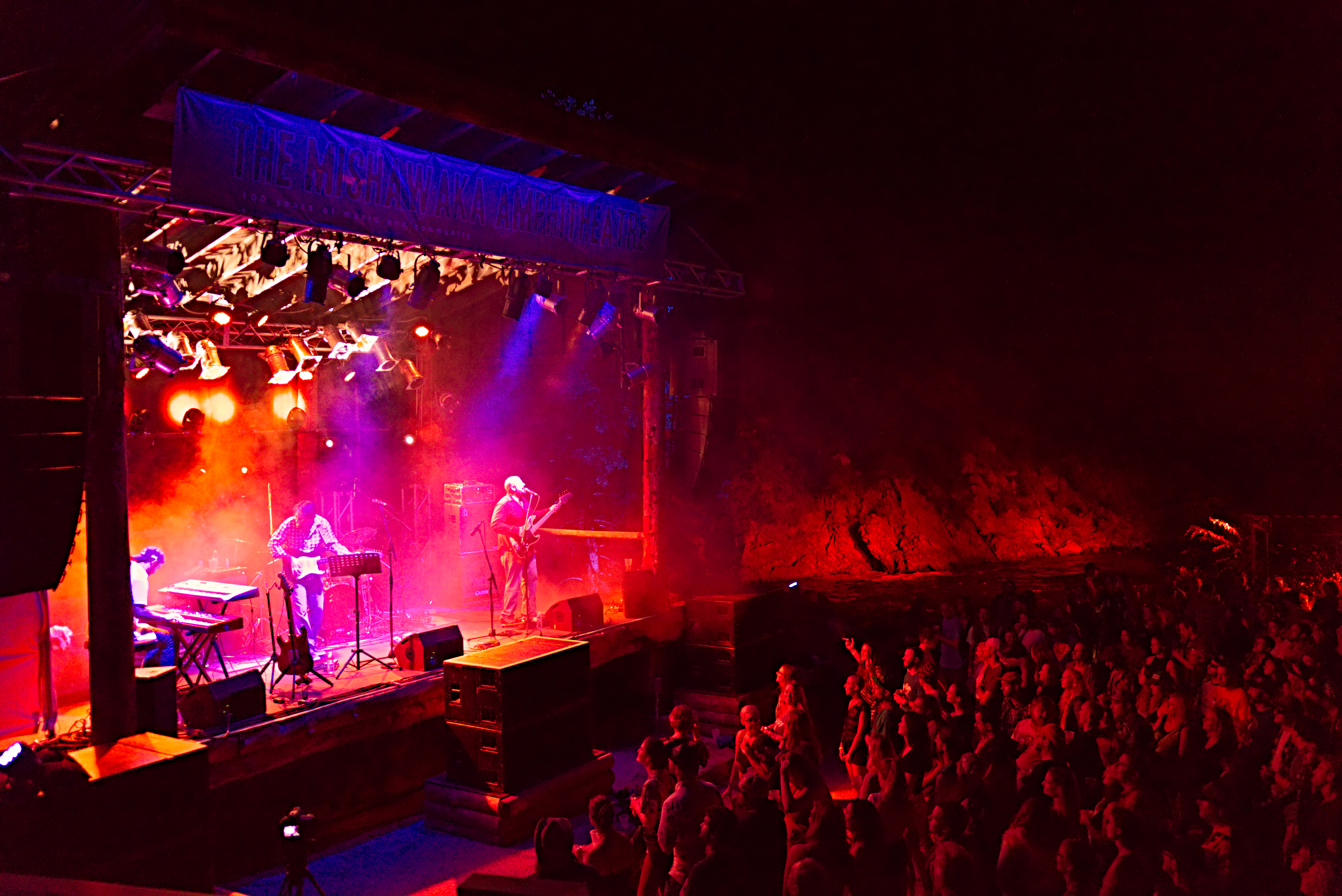
The Dead Floyd performing in 2017

== Notable performances ==
Past performers include Buckethead, Bela Fleck & the Flecktones, Israel Vibration, Medeski, Martin, and Wood, Blackalicious, George Clinton, Sound Tribe Sector Nine, and many others.
