= Elephant Revival =

American folk-music group

- Origin: Nederland, Colorado, United States
- Genres: Folk; bluegrass; indie rock
- Years active: 2006-2018, 2022–present
- Labels: Rough Shod Records, Itz Evolving
- Members: Bonnie Paine; Bridget Law; Dango Rose; Darren Garvey
- Past members: Sage Cook; Daniel Rodriguez
- Website: elephantrevival.com

Elephant Revival is a folk music group from Nederland, Colorado, formed in 2006. The band currently consists of Bonnie Paine, Bridget Law, Dango Rose, and Darren Garvey, and has previously included Sage Cook and Daniel Rodriguez.

The band has referred to their style of music as "transcendental folk," because it transcends several musical categories and incorporates elements of Scottish/Celtic fiddle tunes, original folk pieces, traditional ballads, bluegrass, and indie rock. All members of the band are multi-instrumentalists and contribute vocals and to songwriting.

Individually and collectively, the band members have performed with or opened for Dispatch, Bela Fleck, John Paul Jones, Devotchka, Michael Franti, Little Feat, Yonder Mountain String Band, Nickel Creek, George Clinton and Parliament Funkadelic, Leftover Salmon, Railroad Earth, State Radio, String Cheese Incident, Shanti Groove, and Trampled by Turtles, among others.

== History ==
The band members originate from many parts of the country but have roots in both Colorado and Tahlequah, Oklahoma, Paine's hometown. Several members of the band began playing together in the summer of 2006 in various group combinations in Oklahoma and Colorado. The first show where all five members played together was in Colorado in October 2006 at the Gold Hill Inn, performing as Elephant Revival Concept. After solidifying the group, "Concept" was soon dropped from the name. Elephant Revival's debut, self-titled recording was released in 2008 and produced by David Tiller of Taarka. In the summer of 2010, Elephant Revival was signed to Ruff Shod Records, an independent label started by Chad Stokes of State Radio and Dispatch. Elephant Revival's second CD Break In the Clouds, also produced by Tiller, was released on November 22, 2010.

On June 17, 2016, the band narrowly escaped a bus fire the morning before a show at Music at the Mill in Hickory, North Carolina. Several unique instruments and belongings were destroyed in the fire, but the band members were unharmed and played the show that night with borrowed instruments and donated clothes.

On February 9, 2018, the band announced they would take an indefinite hiatus "due to family matters." Their farewell show was on May 20, 2018.

In fall 2020, Rodriguez announced that he would be releasing an album titled Sojourn of a Burning Sun, produced by bandmate Garvey. In interviews, he explained that the break-up of the band coincided with the ending of a romance between him and another band member.

After a four-year hiatus, Elephant Revival reunited without Rodriguez for a performance in Lyons, Colorado in August 2022. As of 2026, they continue to perform infrequently in the U.S.

== Band members ==
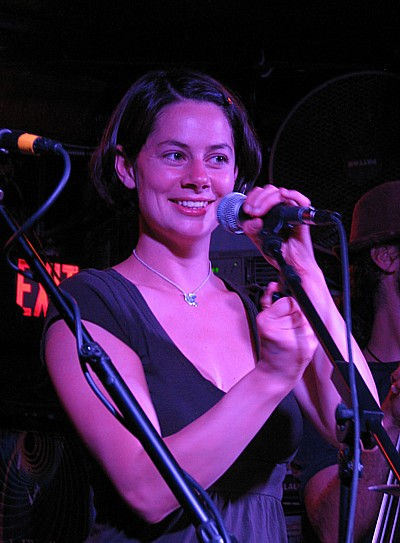
Bonnie Paine, during performance at The Saint, Asbury Park, NJ, June 2011

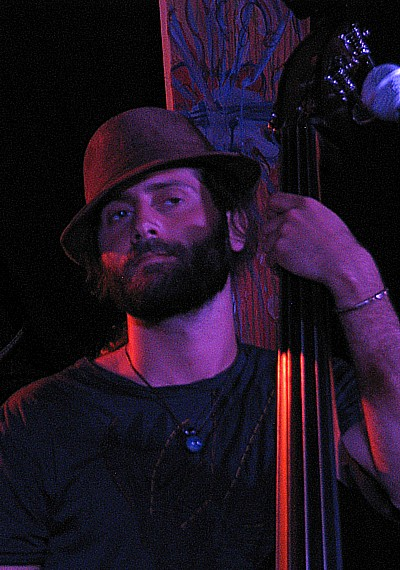
Dango Rose at The Saint, June 2011

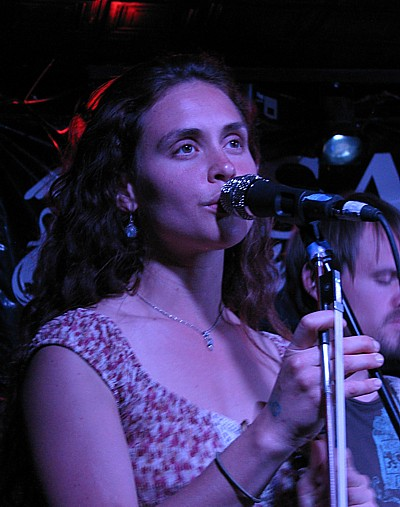
Bridget Law at The Saint, June 2011

- Bridget Law - founding member (fiddle and vocals)
- Bonnie Paine (vocals, stomp box, washboard, djembe, musical saw, cello)
- Charlie Rose (vocals, pedal steel, banjo, cello, trumpet, trombone)
- Dango Rose (double bass, mandolin, banjo, vocals)
- Darren Garvey (percussion)
- Daniel Sproul (guitars, vocals)

=== Former members ===
- Daniel Rodriguez (acoustic guitar, electric guitar/banjo, vocals)
- Sage Cook - founding member (electric banjo/guitar, acoustic guitar, mandolin, viola, vocals)

== Discography ==
- Elephant Revival (2008)
- Break In The Clouds (2010)
- It's Alive (EP) (2012)
- These Changing Skies (2013)
- Sands of Now (Live at the Boulder Theater CD & DVD set) (2015)
- Petals (2016)
