= Phish discography =

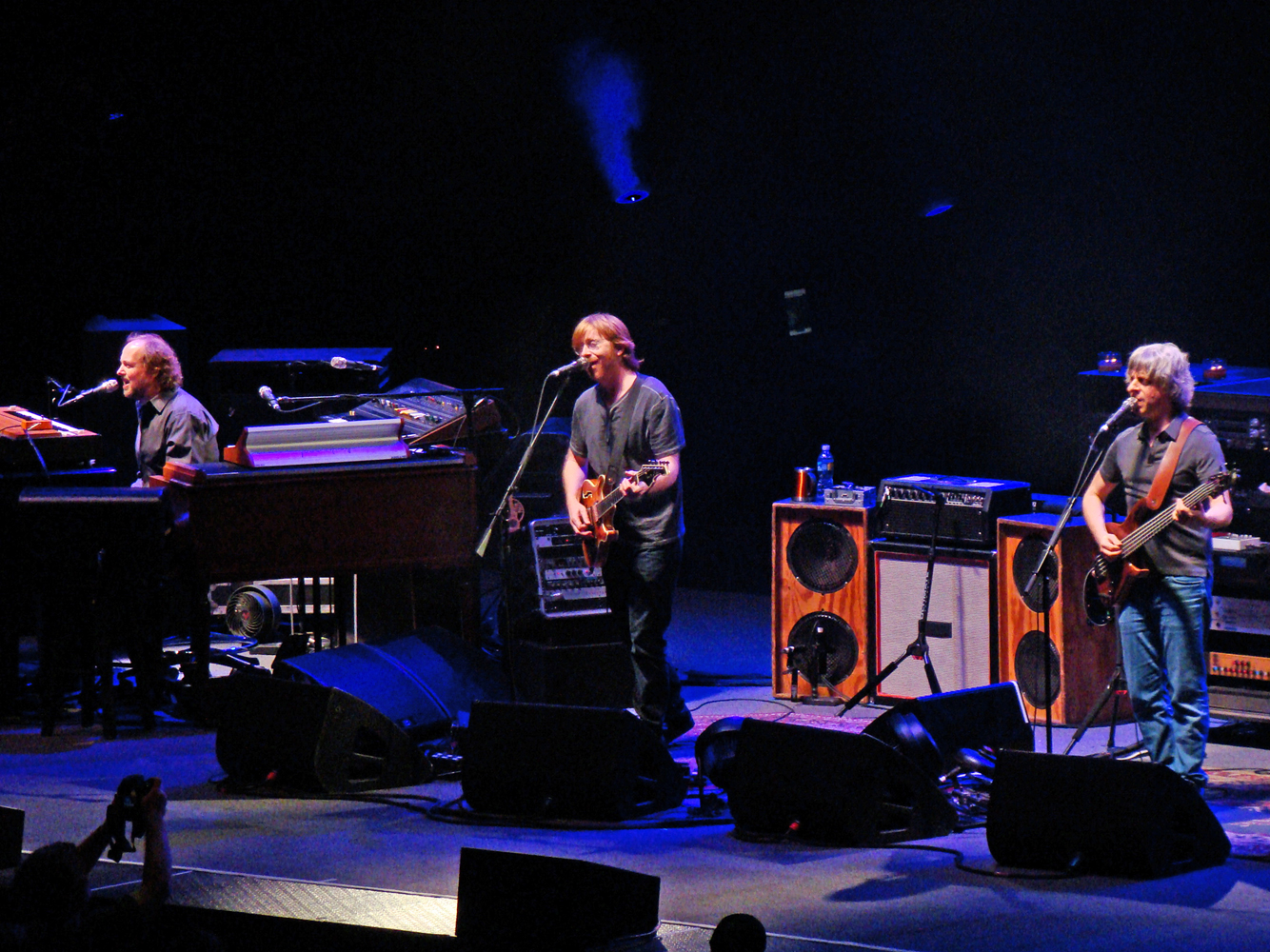
- Phish performing at American Airlines Arena in Miami on December 30, 2009. Left to right: Page McConnell, Trey Anastasio, Mike Gordon; not pictured: Jon Fishman.
- Studio albums: 16
- Live albums: 26
- Compilation albums: 1
- Singles: 29
- Video albums: 11
- Live Phish series: 27
- Archival releases: 31
- Live Bait series: 23

Phish is an American rock band noted for their live concerts and improvisational jamming. Audience recordings of Phish's live shows have been traded among fans since the band's earliest days. In addition to numerous studio albums and projects, Phish has maintained a steady output of live releases and albums, including the Live Phish series, the Live Bait series, the Live Phish Downloads series, along with numerous box sets and stand-alone archival releases. The band has also officially released every show they've performed since 2002, which are available at LivePhish

== Albums ==
=== Studio albums ===
Phish recorded and/or released several albums before being signed to Elektra Records in 1991; they remained with Elektra through 2004, before founding their own label, JEMP Records. Phish's albums all feature the quartet of Trey Anastasio (guitar), Mike Gordon (bass guitar), Jon Fishman (drums), and Page McConnell (keyboards), often joined by a number of guest musicians.

List of studio albums, with selected details, peak chart positions and certifications
Year	Title	Album details	Peak chart positions	Certifications
Year	Title	Album details	US	Certifications
1989	Junta	Released: May 8, 1989; Label: Self-released; Format: CC; Re-released: October 26, 1992; Label: Elektra; Format: 2×CD, CC; Re-released: April 21, 2012; Label: JEMP; Format: Vinyl	—	US: Platinum
1990	Lawn Boy	Released: September 21, 1990; Label: Absolute a Go Go, Rough Trade; Format: CD, CC, vinyl; Re-released: June 30, 1992; Label: Elektra; Format: CD, CC; Re-released: April 20, 2013; Label: JEMP; Format: Vinyl	—	US: Gold
1992	A Picture of Nectar	Released: February 12, 1992; Label: Elektra; Format: CD, CC; Re-released: July 11, 2014; Label: JEMP; Format: Vinyl	110	US: Gold
1993	Rift	Released: February 2, 1993; Label: Elektra; Format: CD, CC; Re-released: August 21, 2015; Label: JEMP; Format: Vinyl	51	US: Gold
1994	Hoist	Released: March 29, 1994; Label: Elektra; Format: CD, CC; Re-released: April 16, 2016; Label: JEMP; Format: Vinyl	34	US: Gold
1996	Billy Breathes	Released: October 15, 1996; Label: Elektra; Format: CD, CC, vinyl	7	US: Gold
1998	The Story of the Ghost	Released: October 27, 1998; Label: Elektra; Format: CD, CC, vinyl	8	—
1999	The Siket Disc	Released: June 3, 1999; Label: Phish Archives; Re-released: November 7, 2000; Label: Elektra; Format: CD; Re-released: December 18, 2015; Label: JEMP; Format: Vinyl	—	—
2000	Farmhouse	Released: May 16, 2000; Label: Elektra; Format: CD, vinyl	12	US: Gold
2002	Round Room	Released: December 10, 2002; Label: Elektra; Format: CD; Re-released: February 2, 2024; Label: JEMP; Format: Vinyl	46	—
2004	Undermind	Released: June 15, 2004; Label: Elektra; Format: CD	13	—
2009	Joy	Released: September 8, 2009; Label: JEMP; Format: CD, vinyl	13	—
2014	Fuego	Released: June 24, 2014; Label: JEMP; Format: CD, vinyl	7	—
2016	Big Boat	Released: October 7, 2016; Label: JEMP; Format: CD, vinyl	19	—
2020	Sigma Oasis	Released: April 2, 2020; Label: JEMP; Format: Digital, CD, vinyl	116	—
2024	Evolve	Released: July 12, 2024; Label: JEMP	69	—
"—" denotes releases that did not chart.

==== Other albums ====
Year	Title	Album details
1986	Phish (The White Tape)	Released: 1986; Label: Self-released; Format: CC; Re-released: 1998; Label: Phish Archives; Format: CD; Re-released: 2010; Label: JEMP; Format: CD; Re-released: 2011, 2012; Label: JEMP; Format: Vinyl
2006	Headphones Jam	Released: 2006; Label: JEMP; Format: Digital
2009	Party Time	Released: September 8, 2009; Label: JEMP; Format: CD, vinyl (limited)
2022	Get More Down (as Sci-Fi Soldier)	Released: October 31, 2022; Format: Digital

==== Unreleased albums ====
List of unreleased albums, with selected details and notes
Year	Title	Album details	Notes
1987	The Man Who Stepped into Yesterday	Recorded: 1987	Student project concept album, never officially released
1990	The Wendell Sessions	Recorded: June 17, 1990	Live, in-studio, early renditions of fan favorites, rarities and jazz covers, not officially released
2002	The Victor Disc	Recorded: December 19, 2002	In-studio jam session, not officially released

=== Live albums ===
List of live albums, with selected details, peak chart positions and certifications
Year	Title	Album details	Peak chart positions	Certifications
Year	Title	Album details	US	Certifications
1995	A Live One	Released: June 27, 1995; Label: Elektra; Format: 2×CD, 2×CC; Recorded: July 8–December 31, 1994	18	US: Platinum
1997	Slip Stitch and Pass	Released: October 28, 1997; Label: Elektra; Format: CD, CC; Recorded: March 1, 1997, Markthalle Club, Hamburg, Germany	17	—
1999	Hampton Comes Alive	Released: November 23, 1999; Label: Elektra; Format: 6×CD box set; Recorded: November 20 & 21, 1998, Hampton Coliseum, Hampton, Virginia	120	US: Gold
2005	New Year's Eve 1995	Released: December 20, 2005; Label: Rhino; Format: 3×CD; Re-released: April 18, 2015; Label: JEMP; Format: 6×LP box set; Recorded: December 31, 1995, Madison Square Garden, New York	—	—
2006	Live in Brooklyn	Released: July 11, 2006; Label: Rhino; Format: 3×CD; Recorded: June 17, 2004, KeySpan Park, Brooklyn, New York	162	—
2006	Colorado '88	Released: October 31, 2006; Label: JEMP; Format: 3×CD; Recorded: July 28–August 5, 1988, Telluride & Aspen, Colorado	—	—
2007	Vegas 96	Released: November 20, 2007; Label: JEMP; Format: 3×CD+DVD box set, 3×CD; Recorded: December 6, 1996, Aladdin Theatre, Las Vegas, Nevada	—	—
2008	At the Roxy	Released: November 18, 2008; Label: JEMP; Format: 8×CD box set; Recorded: February 19, 20 & 21, 1993, Roxy Theatre, Atlanta	148	—
2011	Hampton/Winston-Salem '97	Released: December 6, 2011; Label: JEMP; Format: 7×CD box set; Recorded: November 21, 22 & 23, 1997, Hampton Coliseum, Hampton, Virginia & LJVM Coliseum, Winston-Salem, North Carolina	—	—
2012	Chicago '94	Released: July 31, 2012; Label: JEMP; Format: 6×CD box set; Recorded: June 18 & November 25, 1994, UIC Pavilion, Chicago	121	—
2013	Ventura	Released: June 18, 2013; Label: JEMP; Format: 6×CD box set; Recorded: July 30, 1997 & July 20, 1998, Ventura County Fairgrounds, Ventura, California	123	—
2013	Niagara Falls	Released: November 12, 2013; Label: JEMP; Format: 3×CD; Recorded: December 7, 1995, Niagara Falls Convention Center, Niagara Falls, New York	—	—
2015	Amsterdam	Released: June 16, 2015; Label: JEMP; Format: 8×CD box set; Recorded: February 17, July 1–2, 1997, Paradiso, Amsterdam, Netherlands	—	—
2017	St. Louis '93	Released: March 31, 2017; Label: JEMP; Format: 6×CD box set; Recorded: April 14, August 16, 1993, American Theater, St. Louis, Missouri	—	—
2018	Kasvot Växt: í rokk	Released: November 9, 2018; Label: JEMP; Format: Digital download, streaming; Recorded: October 31, 2018, MGM Grand Garden Arena, Las Vegas, Nevada	—	—
2018	The Complete Baker's Dozen	Released: October 30, 2018; Label: JEMP/Phish Dry Goods; Format: 36×CD box set; Recorded: July 21–August 6, 2017, Madison Square Garden, New York, New York	—	—
2018	The Baker's Dozen: Live at Madison Square Garden	Released: November 30, 2018; Label: JEMP/Phish Dry Goods; Format: 3×CD, 6×LP box set; Recorded: July 21–August 6, 2017, Madison Square Garden, New York, New York	—	—
2021	LP on LP 01	Released: June 18, 2021; Label: JEMP/Phish Dry Goods; Format: LP, streaming; Recorded: July 14, 2019, Alpine Valley Music Theatre, East Troy, Wisconsin	134	—
2021	LP on LP 02	Released: June 18, 2021; Label: JEMP/Phish Dry Goods; Format: LP, streaming; Recorded: May 26, 2011, Bethel Woods Center for the Arts, Bethel, New York	138	—
2022	The Clifford Ball	Released: March 4, 2022; Label: JEMP/Phish Dry Goods; Format: LP, streaming; Recorded: August 16–17, 1996, Plattsburgh Air Force Base, Plattsburgh, New York	—	—
2022	LP on LP 03	Released: August 5, 2022; Label: JEMP/Phish Dry Goods; Format: LP, streaming; Recorded: August 22, 2015, Watkins Glen International, Watkins Glen, New York	—	—
2022	The Gorge '98	Released: December 9, 2022; Label: JEMP/Phish Dry Goods; Format: CD, streaming; Recorded: July 16–17, 1998, The Gorge Amphitheatre, Grant County, Washington	—	—
2023	LP on LP 04	Released: January 13, 2023; Label: JEMP/Phish Dry Goods; Format: LP, streaming; Recorded: May 22, 2000, Radio City Music Hall, New York, New York	—	—
2024	The Spectrum '97	Released: March 15, 2024; Label: JEMP/Phish Dry Goods; Format: CD, streaming; Recorded: December 2–3, 1997, The Spectrum, Philadelphia, Pennsylvania	—	—
2025	LP on LP 05	Released: February 7, 2025; Label: JEMP/Phish Dry Goods; Format: LP, streaming; Recorded: April 2, 1998, Nassau Coliseum, Uniondale, New York	—	—
2025	LP on LP 06	Released: February 7, 2025; Label: JEMP/Phish Dry Goods; Format: LP, streaming; Recorded: August 6, 2021, Ruoff Music Center, Noblesville, Indiana	—	—
2026	New Year's Eve 1993 / Live at Worcester Centrum	Released: February 20, 2026; Label: JEMP/Phish Dry Goods; Format: LP, CD, streaming; Recorded: December 31, 1993, Worcester Centrum Center, Worcester, Massachusetts	—	—
2026	Live in Saratoga Springs 2025	Released: June 26, 2026; Label: JEMP; Format: streaming; Recorded: July 25–27, 2025, Saratoga Performing Arts Center, Saratoga Springs, New York	—	—
2026	LP on LP 07	Released: November 20, 2026; Label: JEMP; Format: LP; Recorded: November 28, 1994, MSU Field House, Bozeman, Montana	—	—
2026	LP on LP 08	Released: November 20, 2026; Label: JEMP; Format: LP; Recorded: September 14, 1999, BSU Pavilion, Boise, Idaho	—	—
"—" denotes releases that did not chart.

==== Live Phish series ====
Beginning in late 2001, the "Live Phish" series are multi-CD sets chronicling complete shows picked by the band spanning their entire career. ^{[A]} The original twenty-volume "Live Phish" series was released by Elektra Records and launched while Phish was on hiatus from recording and touring (October 2000 to December 2002). Numbered 01 through 20, each multi-disc set was made available individually and featured innovative packaging: a cardboard slipcase containing the compact discs housed in a foldable plastic page that could be stored in a ShowCase binder that was sold separately or with select copies of Volume 06. The first six volumes were simultaneously released on September 18, 2001. The rest of the series was then released in sporadic batches through May 2003. Among the initial twenty volumes, there are four two-disc sets, twelve three-disc sets and four quadruple-disc sets totaling over forty-seven and a half hours of live recordings ranging from 1989 to 2000. The original plastic fold-out CD pages eventually began leaking a sticky liquid goo that often ruined the CDs within the covers. Elektra Records thus began re-issuing several Live Phish Volumes 1 through 20 in clamshell CD cases in the mid-2000s.

List of Live Phish albums, with selected details and peak chart positions
Year	Title	Album details	Peak chart positions
Year	Title	Album details	US
2001	Live Phish Volume 1	Released: September 18, 2001; Recorded: December 14, 1995, Broome County Arena, Binghamton, New York	97
2001	Live Phish Volume 2	Released: September 18, 2001; Recorded: July 16, 1994, Sugarbush Summerstage, North Fayston, Vermont	93
2001	Live Phish Volume 3	Released: September 18, 2001; Recorded: September 14, 2000, Darien Lake Performing Arts Center, Darien Center, New York	118
2001	Live Phish Volume 4	Released: September 18, 2001; Recorded: June 14, 2000, Drum Logos, Fukuoka, Japan	127
2001	Live Phish Volume 5	Released: September 18, 2001; Recorded: July 8, 2000, Alpine Valley Music Theater, East Troy, Wisconsin	115
2001	Live Phish Volume 6	Released: October 30, 2001; Recorded: November 27, 1998, The Centrum, Worcester, Massachusetts	105
2002	Live Phish Volume 7	Released: April 16, 2002; Recorded: August 14, 1993, World Music Theatre, Tinley Park, Illinois	128
2002	Live Phish Volume 8	Released: April 16, 2002; Recorded: July 10, 1999, E Centre, Camden, New Jersey	154
2002	Live Phish Volume 9	Released: April 16, 2002; Recorded: August 26, 1989, Townshend Family Park, Townshend, Vermont	141
2002	Live Phish Volume 10	Released: April 16, 2002; Recorded: June 22, 1994, Veterans Memorial Auditorium, Columbus, Ohio	147
2002	Live Phish Volume 11	Released: April 16, 2002; Recorded: November 17, 1997, McNichols Sports Arena, Denver, Colorado	145
2002	Live Phish Volume 12	Released: April 16, 2002; Recorded: August 13, 1996, Deer Creek Music Center, Noblesville, Indiana	138
2002	Live Phish Volume 13	Released: October 29, 2002; Recorded: October 31, 1994, Glens Falls Civic Center, Glens Falls, New York	112
2002	Live Phish Volume 14	Released: October 29, 2002; Recorded: October 31, 1995, Rosemont Horizon, Rosemont, Illinois	146
2002	Live Phish Volume 15	Released: October 29, 2002; Recorded: October 31, 1996, The Omni, Atlanta, Georgia	144
2002	Live Phish Volume 16	Released: October 29, 2002; Recorded: October 31, 1998, Thomas & Mack Center, Las Vegas, Nevada	139
2003	Live Phish Volume 17	Released: May 20, 2003; Recorded: July 15, 1998, Portland Meadows, Portland, Oregon	—
2003	Live Phish Volume 18	Released: May 20, 2003; Recorded: May 7, 1994, The Bomb Factory, Dallas, Texas	—
2003	Live Phish Volume 19	Released: May 20, 2003; Recorded: July 12, 1991, Colonial Theatre, Keene, New Hampshire	—
2003	Live Phish Volume 20	Released: May 20, 2003; Recorded: December 29, 1994, Providence Civic Center, Providence, Rhode Island	—
2004	Live Phish 02.28.03	Released: February 24, 2004; Recorded: February 28, 2003, Nassau Coliseum, Uniondale, New York	—
2004	Live Phish 07.15.03	Released: February 24, 2004; Recorded: July 15, 2003, USANA Amphitheatre, West Valley City, Utah	—
2004	Live Phish 07.29.03	Released: February 24, 2004; Recorded: July 29, 2003, Post-Gazette Pavilion at Star Lake, Burgettstown, Pennsylvania	—
2005	Live Phish 04.02.98	Released: July 20, 2005; Recorded: April 2, 1998, Nassau Coliseum, Uniondale, New York	—
2005	Live Phish 04.03.98	Released: July 20, 2005; Recorded: April 3, 1998, Nassau Coliseum, Uniondale, New York	—
2005	Live Phish 04.04.98	Released: July 20, 2005; Recorded: April 4, 1998, Providence Civic Center, Providence, Rhode Island	—
2005	Live Phish 04.05.98	Released: July 20, 2005; Recorded: April 5, 1998, Providence Civic Center, Providence, Rhode Island	—
"—" denotes releases that did not chart.

==== Live Phish Downloads: Archival releases ====
A: The Live Phish Downloads Series is regularly updated with shows both old and new, available as downloads in various formats, with select shows* made available on CD

Year	Title	Album details
2003	Live Phish Downloads 10.31.90	Released: 2003; Recorded: October 31, 1990, Armstrong Hall, Colorado College, Colorado
2003	Live Phish Downloads 12.01.92	Released: 2003; Recorded: December 1, 1992, Denison University, Granville, Ohio
2003	Live Phish Downloads 05.08.93	Released: 2003 *; Recorded: May 8, 1993, UNH Fieldhouse, Durham, New Hampshire
2003	Live Phish Downloads 10.07.00	Released: 2003; Recorded: October 7, 2000, Shoreline Amphitheatre, Mountain View, California
2004	Live Phish Downloads 12.07.97	Released: 2004 *; Recorded: December 7, 1997, Nutter Center, Dayton, Ohio
2005	Live Phish Downloads 11.30.94	Released: 2005; Recorded: November 30, 1994, Campus Recreation Center, Olympia, Washington
2005	Live Phish Downloads 12.01.94	Released: 2005; Recorded: December 1, 1994, Salem Armory, Salem, Oregon
2005	Live Phish New Orleans Relief	Released: 2005; Recorded: April 26, 1996 and November 7, 1991, New Orleans
2006	Live Phish Downloads 12.29.97	Released: 2006 *; Recorded: December 29, 1997, Madison Square Garden, New York
2007	Live Phish Downloads 08.13.93	Released: 2007 *; Recorded: August 13, 1993, Murat Theatre, Indianapolis
2007	Live Phish Downloads 10.21.95	Released: 2007 *; Recorded: October 21, 1995, Pershing Auditorium, Lincoln, Nebraska
2007	Live Phish Downloads 11.14.95	Released: 2007 *; Recorded: November 14, 1995, University of Central Florida Arena, Orlando, Florida
2007	Live Phish Downloads 12.01.95	Released: 2007 *; Recorded: December 1, 1995, Hersheypark Arena, Hershey, Pennsylvania
2007	Live Phish Downloads 03.18.97	Released: 2007; Recorded: March 18, 1997, Flynn Theatre, Burlington, Vermont
2008	Live Phish Downloads 12.30.97	Released: 2008 *; Recorded: December 30, 1997, Madison Square Garden, New York
2008	Live Phish Downloads 07.06.98	Released: 2008 *; Recorded: July 6, 1998, Lucerna Theatre, Prague, Czech Republic
2008	Live Phish Downloads 07.22.97	Released: August 5, 2008; Recorded: July 22, 1997, Walnut Creek Amphitheatre, Raleigh, North Carolina
2010	Live Phish Downloads 11.19.92	Released: January 2010; Recorded: November 19, 1992, Ross, Arena Colchester, Vermont
2010	Live Phish Downloads 11.02.96	Released: October 19, 2010 *; Recorded: November 2, 1996, Coral Sky Amphitheatre, West Palm Beach, Florida
2011	Live Phish Japan Relief	Released: April 15, 2011 *; Recorded: July 31, 1999, Field of Heaven, Fuji Rock Festival, Japan
2011	Live Phish Downloads 12.31.91	Released: December 31, 2011 *; Recorded: December 31, 1991, Worcester Memorial Auditorium, Worcester, Massachusetts
2012	Live Phish Downloads 12.06.97	Released: September 25, 2012 *; Recorded: December 6, 1997, The Palace at Auburn Hills, Auburn Hills, Michigan
2012	Live Phish Downloads 08.11.98	Released: December 11, 2012; Recorded: August 11, 1998, Star Lake Amphitheatre, Burgettstown, Pennsylvania
2013	Live Phish Downloads 05.03.93	Released: 2013; Recorded: May 3, 1993, State Theatre, New Brunswick, New Jersey
2013	Live Phish Downloads 06.20.95	Released: April 30, 2013; Recorded: June 20, 1995, Blossom Music Center, Cuyahoga Falls, Ohio
2014	Live Phish Downloads 08.07.93	Released: 2014; Recorded: August 7, 1993, Darien Lake Performing Arts Center, Darien Center, New York
2015	Live Phish Downloads 12.16.99	Released: February 24, 2015; Recorded: December 16, 1999, Reynolds Coliseum, Raleigh, North Carolina
2015	Live Phish Downloads 12.12.92	Released: April 14, 2015; Recorded: December 12, 1992, The Spectrum, Toronto, Ontario
2015	Live Phish Downloads 11.22.94	Released: September 25, 2015; Recorded: November 22, 1994, Jesse Auditorium – University of Missouri, Columbia, Missouri
2016	Live Phish Downloads 11.07.96	Released: March 7, 2016; Recorded: November 7, 1996, Rupp Arena, Lexington, Kentucky
2016	Live Phish Downloads 09.14.99	Released: May 12, 2016; Recorded: September 14, 1999, Boise State University Pavilion, Boise, Idaho
2017	Live Phish Downloads 06.26.95	Released: February 23, 2017; Recorded: June 26, 1995, Saratoga Performing Arts Center, Saratoga Springs, New York
2017	Live Phish Downloads 05.17.92	Released: May 15, 2017; Recorded: May 17, 1992, Achilles Rink – Union College, Schenectady, New York
2017	Live Phish Downloads 06.17.94	Released: June 29, 2017; Recorded: June 17, 1994, Eagles Ballroom, Milwaukee, Wisconsin
2018	Live Phish Downloads 08.12.98	Released: February 13, 2018; Recorded: August 12, 1998, Vernon Downs, Vernon, New York
2018	Live Phish Downloads 08.26.93	Released: April 12, 2018; Recorded: August 26, 1993, Arlene Schnitzer Concert Hall, Portland, Oregon
2018	Live Phish Downloads 09.18.99	Released: June 15, 2018; Recorded: September 18, 1999, Coors Amphitheatre, Chula Vista, California
2019	Live Phish Downloads 07.19.91	Released: March 4, 2019; Recorded: July 19, 1991, Somerville Theater, Somerville, Massachusetts
2019	Live Phish Downloads 11.11.98	Released: April 22, 2019; Recorded: November 11, 1998, Van Andel Arena, Grand Rapids, Michigan
2019	Live Phish Downloads 11.30.95	Released: October 4, 2019; Recorded: November 30, 1995, Ervin J. Nutter Center – Wright State University, Dayton, Ohio
2019	Live Phish Downloads 07.23.99	Released: November 25, 2019; Recorded: July 23, 1999, Polaris Amphitheatre, Columbus, Ohio
2020	Live Phish Downloads 11.12.94	Released: March 12, 2020; Recorded: November 12, 1994, MAC Center, Kent State University, Kent, Ohio
2020	Live Phish Downloads 03.08.93	Released: May 15, 2020; Recorded: March 8, 1993, Sweeney Center, Santa Fe, New Mexico
2020	Live Phish Downloads 08.01.98	Released: June 19, 2020; Recorded: August 1, 1998, Alpine Valley Music Theatre, East Troy, Wisconsin
2020	Live Phish Downloads 07.21.97	Released: July 24, 2020; Recorded: July 21, 1997, Virginia Beach Amphitheatre, Virginia Beach, Virginia
2020	Live Phish Downloads 07.08.94	Released: August 21, 2020; Recorded: July 8, 1994, Great Woods Performing Arts Center, Mansfield, Massachusetts
2020	Live Phish Downloads 06.14.95	Released: October 2, 2020; Recorded: June 14, 1995, Mud Island Amphitheatre, Memphis, Tennessee
2020	Live Phish Downloads 12.02.99	Released: November 13, 2020; Recorded: December 2, 1999, The Palace of Auburn Hills, Auburn Hills, Michigan
2020	Live Phish Downloads 11.28.94	Released: December 18, 2020; Recorded: November 28, 1994, Field House – Montana State University, Bozeman, Montana
2021	Live Phish Downloads 08.17.93	Released: January 29, 2021; Recorded: August 17, 1993, Memorial Hall, Kansas City, Kansas
2021	Live Phish Downloads 07.23.97	Released: March 12, 2021; Recorded: July 23, 1997, Lakewood Amphitheatre, Atlanta, Georgia
2021	Live Phish Downloads 06.19.95	Released: April 23, 2021; Recorded: June 19, 1995, Deer Creek Music Center, Noblesville, Indiana
2021	Live Phish Downloads 07.24.93	Released: May 28, 2021; Recorded: July 24, 1993, Great Woods Center for the Performing Arts, Mansfield, Massachusetts
2021	Live Phish Downloads 11.27.96	Released: July 2, 2021; Recorded: November 27, 1996, Key Arena, Seattle, Washington
2022	Live Phish Downloads 09.29.99	Released: March 18, 2022; Recorded: September 29, 1999, Pyramid Arena, Memphis, Tennessee
2022	Live Phish Downloads 12.02.95	Released: November 11, 2022; Recorded: December 2, 1995, New Haven Colisseum, New Haven, Connecticut
2023	Live Phish Downloads 10.29.94	Released: May 26, 2023; Recorded: October 29, 1994, Spartanburg Memorial Auditorium, Spartanburg, South Carolina
2023	Live Phish Downloads 06.16.00	Released: June 30, 2023; Recorded: June 16, 2000, Zepp Osaka, Osaka, Japan
2023	Live Phish Downloads 11.14.97	Released: November 17, 2023; Recorded: November 14, 1997, "E" Center, West Valley City, Utah
2024	Live Phish Downloads 11.30.96	Released: January 12, 2024; Recorded: November 30, 1996, ARCO Arena, Sacramento, California
2024	Live Phish Downloads 08.02.93	Released: November 14, 2024; Recorded: August 2, 1993, Ritz Theatre, Tampa, Florida
2024	Live Phish Downloads 10.26.94	Released: November 14, 2024; Recorded: October 26, 1994, Varsity Gym, Appalachian State University, Boone, North Carolina
2025	Live Phish Downloads 05.16.94	Released: March 21, 2025; Recorded: May 16, 1994, The Wiltern, Los Angeles, California
2025	Live Phish Downloads 09.12.99	Released: June 6, 2025; Recorded: September 12, 1999, Portland Meadows, Portland, Oregon
2025	Live Phish Downloads 12.28.90	Released: November 14, 2025; Recorded: December 28, 1990, The Marquee, New York, New York

=== Compilation albums ===
List of compilation albums, with selected details
Year	Title	Album details
1996	Stash	Released: Spring 1996 (Europe); Label: Elektra; Format: CD

==== Live Bait series ====
List of Live Bait albums, with selected details
Year	Title	Album details
2010	Live Bait Vol. 01 – Summer 2010 Leg 1	Released: August 2010; Recorded: June 12 – July 3, 2010
2010	Live Bait Vol. 02 – Summer 2010 Leg 2	Released: October 2010; Recorded: August 7 – 17, 2010
2010	Live Bait Vol. 03 – Worcester Sampler	Released: November 2010; Recorded: December 31, 1991 – November 29, 1997
2011	Live Bait Vol. 04 – Past Summers	Released: May 2011; Recorded: July 28, 1993 – July 4, 2000
2011	Live Bait Vol. 05 – Festival Sampler	Released: June 2011; Recorded: August 21, 1987 – November 1, 2009
2011	Live Bait Vol. 06 – Colorado Sampler	Released: August 2011; Recorded: March 13, 1993 – February 8, 2003
2012	Live Bait Vol. 07 – 2012 Leg 1 Past Summers Compilation	Released: May 2012; Recorded: July 27, 1992 – October 31, 2010
2012	Live Bait Vol. 08 – 2012 Leg 2 Past Summers Compilation	Released: August 2012; Recorded: August 6, 1993 – September 3, 2011
2013	Live Bait Vol. 09	Released: June 2013; Recorded: June 15, 1995 – August 31, 2012
2014	Live Bait Vol. 10	Released: June 2014; Recorded: March 27, 1992 – August 31, 2012
2015	Live Bait Vol. 11	Released: June 2015; Recorded: November 8, 1991 – September 1, 2012
2016	Live Bait Vol. 12	Released: June 2016; Recorded: July 14, 1993 – September 5, 2015
2017	Live Bait Vol. 13	Released: July 2017; Recorded: June 17, 1993 – December 30, 2016
2018	Live Bait Vol. 14	Released: July 2018; Recorded: August 2, 1997 – August 22, 2015
2018	Live Bait Vol. 15	Released: October 2018; Recorded: January 15, 2016 – January 15, 2017
2019	Live Bait Vol. 16	Released: June 2019; Recorded: December 4, 1992 – September 17, 2000
2021	Live Bait Vol. 17	Released: July 2021; Recorded: October 25, 1994 – August 29, 2014
2021	Live Bait Vol. 18	Released: October 2021; Recorded: April 16, 1992 – February 14, 2003
2022	Live Bait Vol. 19	Released May 2022; Recorded August 12, 1993 – June 19, 2019
2023	Live Bait Vol. 20	Released April 2023; Recorded November 22, 1992 – August 3, 2018
2024	Live Bait Vol. 21	Released June 2024; Recorded February 13, 1993 – May 27, 2011
2025	Live Bait Vol. 22	Released April 2025; Recorded December 15, 1989 – June 20, 2004
2025	Live Bait Vol. 23	Released June 2025; Recorded August 15, 1993 – December 18, 1999
2026	Live Bait Vol. 24	Released May 2026; Recorded November 14, 1991 – November 6, 1998

== Singles ==
From 1992 to 2004 Phish was signed with Elektra Records and released seventeen CD promo singles for radio DJs and one commercial cassette single, "Down with Disease". In 2005 Phish started their own record label, JEMP Records (in association with Rhino for a year) and have released one promo single and four digital singles since.

List of singles, with selected peak chart positions
Year	Title	Peak chart positions				Album
Year	Title	US Alt.	US Main.	US Adult Pop	US Triple A	Album
1992	"Chalk Dust Torture"	—	— (Note: "Chalk Dust Torture" reached number 53 on the AOR chart published by Radio & Records dated May 15, 1992.)	—	—	A Picture of Nectar
1992	"Cavern"	—	—	—	—	A Picture of Nectar
1993	"Fast Enough for You"	—	— (Note: "Fast Enough for You" reached number 50 on the AOR chart published by Radio & Records dated March 19, 1993.)	—	—	Rift
1993	"The Wedge"	—	—	—	—	Rift
1994	"Down with Disease"	—	33	—	—	Hoist
1994	"Sample in a Jar"	—	—	—	—	Hoist
1994	"Julius"	—	—	—	—	Hoist
1995	"Bouncing Around the Room" (Live)	—	— (Note: "Bouncing Around the Room" reached number 34 on the rock chart published by Radio & Records dated August 18, 1995.)	—	— (Note: "Bouncing Around the Room" reached number 27 on the adult alternative chart published by Radio & Records dated September 22, 1995.)	A Live One
1995	"Gumbo" (Live)	—	—	—	—	A Live One
1996	"Free"	24	11	—	7	Billy Breathes
1997	"Character Zero"	—	—	—	—	Billy Breathes
1998	"Birds of a Feather"	—	—	—	14	The Story of the Ghost
1998	"Wading in the Velvet Sea"	—	—	—	—	The Story of the Ghost
2000	"Heavy Things"	—	—	29	2	Farmhouse
2000	"Back on the Train"	—	—	—	32	Farmhouse
2002	"46 Days"	—	—	—	—	Round Room
2004	"The Connection"	—	—	—	2	Undermind
2005	"Strange Design" (Live)	—	—	—	—	New Year's Eve 1995
2009	"Time Turns Elastic"	—	—	—	—	Joy
2009	"Backwards Down the Number Line"	—	—	—	9	Joy
2014	"Waiting All Night"	—	—	—	—	Fuego
2014	"The Line"	—	—	—	16	Fuego
2014	"555"	—	—	—	—	Fuego
2016	"Breath and Burning"	—	—	—	23	Big Boat
2016	"Blaze On"	—	—	—	—	Big Boat
2024	"Evolve"	—	—	—	39	Evolve
2024	"Oblivion"	—	—	—	—	Evolve
2024	"Hey Stranger"	—	—	—	—	Evolve
2024	"Life Saving Gun"	—	—	—	—	Evolve
"—" denotes releases that did not chart.

== Video releases ==
List of video releases, with selected details and certifications
Year	Title	Details	RIAA certification
1994	Tracking	Released: October 1, 1994; Recorded: 1993, Los Angeles; Format: VHS	—
2001	Bittersweet Motel	Released: March 6, 2001; Recorded: 1997–1998, various locations; Format: DVD	—
2002	Live in Vegas	Released: November 12, 2002; Recorded: September 30, 2000, Thomas & Mack Center, Las Vegas; Format: DVD	Gold: February 13, 2003
2004	It	Released: October 12, 2004; Recorded: August 2–3, 2003, Loring Air Force Base, Limestone, Maine; Format: DVD	Gold: January 26, 2005; Platinum: January 26, 2005
2004	Specimens of Beauty	Released: June 15, 2004; Recorded: 2004, The Barn, Burlington, Vermont; Format: DVD	—
2006	Live in Brooklyn	Released: July 11, 2006; Recorded: June 17, 2004, KeySpan Park, Brooklyn, New York; Format: DVD	—
2008	Walnut Creek	Released: August 5, 2008; Recorded: July 22, 1997, Walnut Creek Amphitheatre, Raleigh, North Carolina; Format: DVD	—
2009	The Clifford Ball	Released: March 3, 2009; Recorded: August 16–17, 1996, Plattsburgh Air Force Base, Plattsburgh, New York; Format: DVD	—
2010	Phish 3D	Released: April 20, 2010; Recorded: October 29–November 1, 2009, Festival 8, Indio, California; Format: Film	—
2010	Coral Sky	Released: October 19, 2010; Recorded: November 2, 1996, Coral Sky Amphitheatre, West Palm Beach, Florida; Format: DVD	—
2010	Alpine Valley 2010	Released: December 14, 2010; Recorded: August 14–15, 2010, Alpine Valley Music Theatre, East Troy, Wisconsin; Format: DVD/CD set	—
2011	Live in Utica	Released: May 17, 2011; Recorded: October 20, 2010, Utica Memorial Auditorium, Utica, New York; Format: DVD/CD set	—
2012	Star Lake 98	Released: December 11, 2012; Recorded: August 11, 1998, Star Lake Amphitheatre, Burgettstown, Pennsylvania; Format: DVD	—

== Phish tributes discography ==
Since 2000, various artists have recorded a number of tribute albums dedicated to the rock band Phish. Like Phish's music, the albums cover a wide range of genres including reggae, bluegrass, classical music, and more. The first Phish tribute album - Sharin' in the Groove - was a double album created by a non-profit group of fans called The Mockingbird Foundation, who also published The Phish Companion. The album features a number of high-profile musicians performing Phish songs, including Jimmy Buffett, The Wailers, Dave Matthews, Arlo Guthrie, Hot Tuna, Tom Tom Club, and members of Pavement and Los Lobos. The members of Phish officially endorsed this album, which also featured an album release concert at the Great American Music Hall in San Francisco led by Merl Saunders. In 2002, members of the Birmingham, Alabama bluegrass group Rollin' In The Hay collaborated with a number of other bluegrass musicians to release Gone Phishin: A Bluegrass Tribute to Phish, featuring all instrumental versions of Phish classics. The album was a success, and a sequel followed later in the year with a song list that included more obscure Phish songs. In 2004, Phish became one of over a hundred bands to have their songs interpreted by a string quartet (joining the ranks of Tool, Radiohead, and U2). Another bluegrass tribute (this time with vocals) by a group of Nashville-based musicians was released later in the year.

- Gone Phishin: A Bluegrass Tribute to Phish (2000)
- Sharin' in the Groove: Celebrating the Music of Phish (2001)
- Still Phishin: A Bluegrass Tribute to Phish 2 (2002)
- JamGrass (Progressive Bluegrass Jams on a Band Called Phish) (2004)
- The String Quartet Tribute to Phish (2004)
- High Neighbors: Dub Tribute to Phish (2006)
- Dub Like an Antelope - Legends of Reggae Celebrate Phish (2009)

== Books ==
- The Phish Book (official biography written by Phish and Richard Gehr – 1998)
- Phish: The Biography (non-official biography written by Parke Puterbaugh – 2009)

== Live albums by recording date ==
This is a list of live Phish albums released on CD or LP, in recording date order.

- Colorado '88 – July 28 – August 5, 1988
- Live Phish 09 – August 26, 1989
- Live Phish 19 – July 12, 1991
- At the Roxy – February 19 – 21, 1993
- St. Louis '93 – April 14 – August 16, 1993
- Live Phish 07 – August 14, 1993
- New Year's Eve 1993 – December 31, 1993
- Live Phish 18 – May 7, 1994
- Chicago '94 – June 18 – November 25, 1994
- Live Phish 10 – June 22, 1994
- A Live One – July 8 – December 31, 1994
- Live Phish 02 – July 16, 1994
- Live Phish 13 – October 31, 1994
- Live Phish 20 – December 29, 1994
- Live Phish 14 – October 31, 1995
- Niagara Falls – December 7, 1995
- Live Phish 01 – December 14, 1995
- New Year's Eve 1995 – December 31, 1995
- Live Phish 12 – August 13, 1996
- The Clifford Ball – August 16 – 17, 1996
- Live Phish 15 – October 31, 1996
- Vegas 96 – December 6, 1996
- Amsterdam – February 17 – July 2, 1997
- Slip Stitch and Pass – March 1, 1997
- Ventura – July 30, 1997 – July 20, 1998
- Live Phish 11 – November 17, 1997
- Hampton/Winston-Salem '97 – November 21 – 23, 1997
- The Spectrum '97 – December 2 – 3, 1997
- LP on LP 05 – April 2, 1998
- Live Phish 04.02.98 – April 2, 1998
- Live Phish 04.03.98 – April 3, 1998
- Live Phish 04.04.98 – April 4, 1998
- Live Phish 04.05.98 – April 5, 1998
- Live Phish 17 – July 15, 1998
- The Gorge '98 – July 16 – 17, 1998
- Live Phish 16 – October 31, 1998
- Hampton Comes Alive – November 20 – 21, 1998
- Live Phish 06 – November 27, 1998
- Live Phish 08 – July 10, 1999
- LP on LP 04 – May 22, 2000
- Live Phish 04 – June 14, 2000
- Live Phish 05 – July 8, 2000
- Live Phish 03 – September 14, 2000
- Live Phish 02.28.03 – February 28, 2003
- Live Phish 07.15.03 – July 15, 2003
- Live Phish 07.29.03 – July 29, 2003
- Live in Brooklyn – June 17, 2004
- LP on LP 02 – May 26, 2011
- LP on LP 03 – August 22, 2015
- The Complete Baker's Dozen – July 21 – August 6, 2017
- The Baker's Dozen: Live at Madison Square Garden – July 21 – August 6, 2017
- Kasvot Växt: í rokk – October 31, 2018
- LP on LP 01 – July 14, 2019
- LP on LP 06 – August 6, 2021
- Phish: Live In Saratoga Springs 2025 – July 25 – 27, 2025
