= Live Phish Volume 8 =

Live Phish Vol. 8

Live album by Phish
- Released: April 16, 2002
- Recorded: July 10, 1999
- Genre: Rock
- Length: 2:26:47
- Label: Elektra
- Producer: Phish

Live Phish Series chronology
Live Phish Volume 7 (2002)	Live Phish Volume 8 (2002)	Live Phish Volume 9 (2002)

Professional ratings
Review scores
Source	Rating
Allmusic	2.5/5 stars

Live Phish Vol. 8 was recorded live at the E Centre in Camden, New Jersey, on July 10, 1999.

This show is known specifically for the superlative version of "Chalk Dust Torture," which guitarist Trey Anastasio has referred to as one of the greatest Phish jams of all time. Upon hearing the song, drummer Jon Fishman lobbied for this show release as part of the Live Phish Series.

Much like Live Phish Volume 5, fan reaction was mixed upon the show's release, as many felt the concert was released primarily for the version of "Chalk Dust Torture" and that the rest of the show was only fairly average for 1999, a year punctuated by numerous standout shows. Aside from the album's most famous jam, the highly regarded first set includes a cover of jazz-organist Jimmy Smith's funky instrumental "Back at the Chicken Shack." In the second set the band heads into deep funk territory during a twenty-minute "Tweezer" and closes the show with a cover of The Beatles' "While My Guitar Gently Weeps".

== Track listing ==
=== Disc one ===
Set one:

1. "Wilson" (Anastasio, Marshall, Woolf) - 7:38
2. "Chalk Dust Torture" (Anastasio, Marshall) - 14:09
3. "Roggae" (Anastasio, Fishman, Gordon, Marshall, McConnell) - 8:15
4. "Water in the Sky" (Anastasio, Marshall) - 5:57
5. "Back at the Chicken Shack" (Smith) - 7:18
6. "Sparkle" (Anastasio, Marshall) - 3:59
7. "Bathtub Gin" (Anastasio, Goodman) - 16:15
8. "Golgi Apparatus" (Anastasio, Marshall, Szuter, Woolf) - 5:05

=== Disc two ===
Set two:

1. "Tweezer" (Anastasio, Fishman, Gordon, McConnell) - 20:32
2. "Mountains in the Mist" (Anastasio, Marshall) - 7:21
3. "Birds of a Feather" (Anastasio, Fishman, Gordon, Marshall, McConnell) - 14:09
4. "When the Circus Comes" (Hidalgo, Pérez) - 7:07
5. "Fluffhead" (Anastasio, Pollak) - 18:30

Encore:

6. "While My Guitar Gently Weeps" (Harrison) - 6:02
7. "Tweezer Reprise" (Anastasio, Fishman, Gordon, McConnell) - 4:30

== Personnel ==
- Trey Anastasio - guitars, lead vocals, co-lead vocals on "Roggae"
- Page McConnell - piano, organ, backing vocals, co-lead vocals on "Roggae"
- Mike Gordon - bass, backing vocals, co-lead vocals on "Roggae"
- Jon Fishman - drums, backing vocals, co-lead vocals on "Roggae"
