= Live Phish Volume 13 =

Live Phish Vol. 13

Live album by Phish
- Released: October 29, 2002
- Recorded: October 31–November 1, 1994
- Genre: Rock
- Length: 4:06:00
- Label: Elektra
- Producer: Phish

Live Phish Series chronology
Live Phish Volume 12 (2002)	Live Phish Volume 13 (2002)	Live Phish Volume 14 (2002)

Professional ratings
Review scores
Source	Rating
Allmusic	3.5/5 stars

Live Phish Vol. 13 is a live album by American rock band Phish, which was recorded live at the Glens Falls Civic Center in Glens Falls, New York on Halloween night, 1994. It was released on October 29, 2002, along with Volume 14, Volume 15, and Volume 16.

It marks the first of seven Halloween shows in which Phish dressed up in a "musical costume" by performing an album from another artist in its entirety. The band took votes from fans via snail mail (50 votes), leading to a complete performance of the 30-song, self-titled Beatles double album, also known as the White Album, sandwiched in between two sets of Phish's own music. The album's final number, "Good Night", is not included on this release, as it was not actually played by Phish, but rather the studio recording was played over the PA at the conclusion of the set.

Phish took few liberties in covering the album with the exception of "Don't Pass Me By" and "Birthday". "Don't Pass Me By" was played in double-time while "Birthday" was slowed down and played in a minor key without lyrics as the band presented a birthday cake on stage to Phish road manager Brad Sands. "Helter Skelter" concludes with the line "I've got blisters on my fingers" sung in barbershop harmony.

The concert had a stated start time of 9:30 p.m. and ended at 3:20 a.m.—the longest Phish concert up to that point. This is also the longest volume in the Live Phish Series consisting of material from one night (Volume 16 is the longest including filler) clocking in at just over four hours.

This album is one of 10 "live jam releases of this century" according to the August 2006 issue of Guitar One magazine.

== Track listing ==
=== Disc one ===
Set one:

1. "Frankenstein" (Winter) - 4:57
2. "Sparkle" (Anastasio, Marshall) - 3:45
3. "Simple" (Gordon) - 8:25
4. "Divided Sky" (Anastasio) - 16:49
5. "Harpua" (contains a partial cover of "War Pigs") (Anastasio, Fishman) - 14:53
6. "Julius" (Anastasio, Marshall) - 7:51
7. "The Horse" (Anastasio, Marshall) - 1:30
8. "Silent in the Morning" (Anastasio, Marshall) - 5:06

=== Disc two ===
Set one, continued:

1. "Reba" (Anastasio) - 15:38
2. "Golgi Apparatus" (Anastasio, Marshall, Szuter, Woolf) - 5:10

Set two:

3. "Ed Sullivan Intro" (Sullivan) - 0:18
4. "Back in the U.S.S.R." (Lennon, McCartney) - 2:28
5. "Dear Prudence" (Lennon, McCartney) - 4:02
6. "Glass Onion" (Lennon, McCartney) - 2:10
7. "Ob-La-Di, Ob-La-Da" (Lennon, McCartney) - 2:43
8. "Wild Honey Pie" (Lennon, McCartney) - 0:54
9. "The Continuing Story of Bungalow Bill" (Lennon, McCartney) - 2:54
10. "While My Guitar Gently Weeps" (Harrison) - 5:58
11. "Happiness is a Warm Gun" (Lennon, McCartney) - 2:46
12. "Martha My Dear" (Lennon, McCartney) - 2:15
13. "I'm So Tired" (Lennon, McCartney) - 2:02
14. "Blackbird" (Lennon, McCartney) - 2:18
15. "Piggies" (Harrison) - 1:59
16. "Rocky Raccoon" (Lennon, McCartney) - 3:26
17. "Don't Pass Me By" (Starkey) - 2:54

=== Disc three ===
Set two, continued:

1. "Why Don't We Do It in the Road?" (Lennon, McCartney) - 2:19
2. "I Will" (Lennon, McCartney) - 1:42
3. "Julia" (Lennon, McCartney) - 2:46
4. "Birthday" (Lennon, McCartney) - 2:11
5. "Yer Blues" (Lennon, McCartney) - 3:44
6. "Mother Nature's Son" (Lennon, McCartney) - 2:35
7. "Everybody's Got Something to Hide Except Me and My Monkey" (Lennon, McCartney) - 3:15
8. "Sexy Sadie" (Lennon, McCartney) - 2:55
9. "Helter Skelter" (Lennon, McCartney) - 4:24
10. "Long, Long, Long" (Harrison) - 2:30
11. "Revolution 1" (Lennon, McCartney) - 5:23
12. "Honey Pie" (Lennon, McCartney) - 2:35
13. "Savoy Truffle" (Harrison) - 2:42
14. "Cry Baby Cry" (Lennon, McCartney) - 5:45
15. "Revolution 9" (Lennon, McCartney) - 4:27

=== Disc four ===
Set three:

1. "David Bowie" (Anastasio) - 13:41
2. "Bouncing Around the Room" (Anastasio, Marshall) - 3:42
3. "Slave to the Traffic Light" (Abrahams, Anastasio, Pollak) - 10:49
4. "Rift" (Anastasio, Marshall) - 5:38
5. "Sleeping Monkey" (Anastasio, Marshall) - 5:30
6. "Poor Heart" (Gordon) - 2:13
7. "Run Like an Antelope" - (Anastasio, Marshall, Pollak) - 11:52

Encore:

8. "Amazing Grace" (Newton) - 2:14
9. "Costume Contest" - 7:19
10. "The Squirming Coil" (Anastasio, Marshall) - 10:41

== Personnel ==
- Trey Anastasio - guitars, lead vocals, narration on "Harpua", drums on "Why Don't We Do It in the Road?", acapella vocals on "Amazing Grace"
- Page McConnell - piano, organ, backing vocals, lead vocals on "Silent in the Morning", "Dear Prudence", "Ob-La-Di, Ob-La-Da", "I Will", "Mother Nature's Son" and "Sexy Sadie", co-lead vocals on "Rift", acapella vocals on "Amazing Grace"
- Mike Gordon - bass, backing vocals, lead vocals on "I'm So Tired", "Blackbird", "Don't Pass Me By", "Julia", "Yer Blues", "Honey Pie" and "Poor Heart", acapella vocals on "Amazing Grace"
- Jon Fishman - drums, backing vocals, lead vocals on "Why Don't We Do It in the Road?", vacuum on "Cry Baby Cry" and "Revolution 9", acapella vocals on "Amazing Grace"

== See also ==
- Phish and their musical costumes
