= Live in Brooklyn =

Live in Brooklyn may refer to:

- Live in Brooklyn (EP), a 2012 EP by Jay-Z
- Live in Brooklyn (They Might Be Giants album), a 2016 live album by They Might Be Giants
- Phish: Live in Brooklyn, a 2006 album by Phish
- Phish: Live in Brooklyn (DVD), a 2006 concert DVD by Phish
- Live in Brooklyn, 2009 album by Mock Orange (band)
