= Harpua =

Song by Phish

Song by Phish

from the album Colorado '88
- Released: 2006
- Genre: Rock
- Length: 12:27 (on Colorado '88)
- Label: JEMP Records
- Songwriters: Trey Anastasio, Jon Fishman
- Producer: Phish

"Harpua" is a Phish song that was a staple of their live concerts, but has now become a rarity and has only been performed live. Its first appearance on an album was on Live Phish Volume 2, a 2001 release featuring a concert from 1994. Though it follows the same basic structure in every performance (see The Divided Sky and You Enjoy Myself for other examples of songs in which variation occurs within a fixed structure), Trey Anastasio narrates a different story at every concert.

The song's introduction is an a cappella "oom pah pah" melody sung by all members of the band.

After its first appearance on record, the song later appeared on Live Phish Volume 13 (2002, recorded 1994), Live Phish Volume 14 (2002, recorded 1995), Colorado '88 (2006, recorded 1988), Vegas 96 (2007, recorded 1996 and featuring Les Claypool and Larry LaLonde), The Clifford Ball (2009, recorded 1996) and Chicago '94 (2012, recorded 1994).

== "Harpua" section ==
A section of Gamehendge-related lyrics, concerning "me and Harpua", follows the a cappella introduction. They are occasionally improvised upon, but the melody remains the same. The Harpua section is composed in 7/8 time.

== The story ==
A new guitar lick follows the end of the "Harpua" section, introducing a unique story that Trey Anastasio tells at every performance of the song. Rarely, Jon Fishman interjects with humorous asides during the narration.

It is often (more clearly) revealed in this section that Harpua is a dog. Also, a character named Jimmy (through several performances it revealed that Jimmy is really Fishman i.e. 12/06/1996, 07/29/2003), who owns a cat called Poster Nutbag is always featured. Poster Nutbag will always be dead by the end of the story, often as a result of a disastrous occurrence (see below.) Other recurring themes included:

- A village (usually in Gamehenge or a Utopian state, surrounded by forest and mountains)
- Characters from Gamehenge (such as Wilson)
- Making a reference to the venue and date of the concert
- A very brief cover of another song to complement the plot of the story
  - "Voodoo Chile" by Jimi Hendrix on 6/17/94
  - "Also Sprach Zarathustra" [better known as the theme from 2001: A Space Odyssey] by Richard Strauss on 7/16/94
  - "War Pigs" by Black Sabbath on 10/31/94
  - "Beat It" by Michael Jackson on 10/31/95
  - "I Want to Be a Cowboy's Sweetheart" and "Suspicious Minds" by Elvis on 12/06/96
  - "Champagne Supernova" by Oasis on 12/29/96
  - "I'm Gonna Be (500 Miles)" by The Proclaimers on 12/30/97
  - The band also performed the entire Dark Side of the Moon (Pink Floyd) album on 11/02/98
  - "Fooled Around and Fell in Love" by Elvin Bishop on 7/29/03
  - "I Kissed A Girl" by Katy Perry on 8/16/09
  - "Killing in the Name" by Rage Against the Machine on 7/4/10 (this song was covered in its entirety)
  - ""After Midnight" by JJ Cale on 9/6/15 (this song was covered in its entirety)
  - "Once in a Lifetime" by Talking Heads on 9/6/15 (this song was covered in its entirety)
  - "United We Stand" by Tony Hiller and Peter Simmons on 9/6/15 (this song was covered in its entirety)

== The end of the storm ==
It is usual in “Harpua” for there to be some kind of storm or other disastrous weather condition to occur. This will more than likely occur when something happens with Jimmy or Poster Nutbag, in which an outside force will conjure a natural disaster to happen. This usually takes place in the form of a giant rainstorm or typhoon. However, on the 10/31/1995 version, the “Vibration of Death” (conjured by Harpua’s owner) sucks Poster Nutbag into the depths of hell.

== The death of Poster Nutbag ==
One way or another, Trey will kill off Poster Nutbag at or near the very end of the story using the aforementioned storm or some other form of death. This results in a conversation between Jimmy (narrated by Page McConnell) and his father (narrated by Mike Gordon) that is generally the same every time it is performed.

Father: Jimmy?
Jimmy: Yes, dad?
Father: Jimmy, I have bad news.
Jimmy: What is it, dad?
Father: It's about your cat... Poster.
Jimmy: Poster Nutbag?
Father: Your cat died!

Poster is dead (2x)
Poster's so dead 

Father: How about a goldfish?
Jimmy: I don't want a goldfish (3x), I want a dog... A dog...

== A Dog in the Station ==
This request on Jimmy's part provokes the beginning of the next section, which is a new song in a poppish format.:

There's a dog in the station
With an ugly mutation
And it needs lubrication each day
There's a dog in the station
Contemplating rotation
As a form of recreation and play

A dog...

At this point there is a blues jam on the piano by Page McConnell. Then:

There's a dog in the station
With a bad reputation
It's a sign of the nation's decay
But the dog in the station
Doesn't need a vacation
As the people rush by dressed in gray...

A dog...

A final jam through the melody of "Dog in the Station" and a recapitulation of the lick that introduced the "story" section on top of a final "A dog...." ends the song.
