= Live Phish Volume 4 =

Live Phish Vol. 4

Live album by Phish
- Released: September 18, 2001
- Recorded: June 14, 2000
- Genre: Rock
- Length: 2:38:02
- Label: Elektra
- Producer: Phish

Live Phish Series chronology
Live Phish Volume 3 (2001)	Live Phish Volume 4 (2001)	Live Phish Volume 5 (2001)

Professional ratings
Review scores
Source	Rating
Allmusic	2/5 stars

Live Phish Vol. 4 was recorded live at the Drum Logos club in Fukuoka, Japan on June 14, 2000.

At the time, Phish was one of the biggest live bands in America, consistently selling out amphitheaters and arenas. However, in Japan, the shows were smaller and much more intimate than the usual Phish concert. The overall mood of the music at the Fukuoka show was quiet and mellow. Most of the second set was tied together with extended excursions into quiet, ambient improvisation, especially on the half-hour version of "Twist." The audience remains dead silent through most of the band's performances but erupts at the end of each song.

Users of Phish.net, the largest and quasi-official Phish fan website, rank the June 14, 2000 concert as the second highest rated concert in the band's history. The concert is usually the highest rated Phish show on the website that was performed outside of the United States.

The release reached a peak position of #127 on the Billboard 200 chart.

== Track listing ==
=== Disc one ===
Set one:

1. "Carini" (Anastasio, Fishman, Gordon, McConnell) - 9:53
2. "The Curtain" (Anastasio, Daubert) - 6:37
3. "Cities" (Byrne) - 9:36
4. "Gumbo" (Anastasio, Fishman) - 12:17
5. "Llama" (Anastasio) - 5:09
6. "Fee" (Anastasio) - 6:40
7. "Heavy Things" (Anastasio, Herman, Marshall) - 5:28
8. "Split Open and Melt" (Anastasio) - 15:00

=== Disc two ===
Set two:

1. "Back on the Train" (Anastasio, Marshall) - 13:33
2. "Twist" (Anastasio, Marshall) - 18:01
3. "Fukuoka Jam #1" (Anastasio, Fishman, Gordon, McConnell) - 16:19
4. "Walk Away" (Walsh) - 4:44
5. "Fukuoka Jam #2" (Anastasio, Fishman, Gordon, McConnell) - 6:46

=== Disc three ===
Set two, continued:

1. "2001" (Deodato) - 14:12

Encore:

2. "Sleep" (Anastasio, Marshall) - 3:15
3. "The Squirming Coil" (Anastasio, Marshall) - 10:32

== Personnel ==
- Trey Anastasio - guitars, lead vocals
- Page McConnell - piano, organ, backing vocals, lead vocals on "Walk Away"
- Mike Gordon - bass, backing vocals
- Jon Fishman - drums, backing vocals
