= Harry Hood (song) =

Song by Phish

from the album A Live One
- Released: 27 June 1995
- Genre: Progressive rock, neo-psychedelia
- Length: 15:11
- Label: Elektra
- Songwriters: Trey Anastasio; Jon Fishman; Mike Gordon; Brian Long; Page McConnell
- Producer: Phish

"Harry Hood" is a song that is commonly performed live by the American band Phish, first released on their 1995 live album A Live One. It is one of Phish's most frequently performed songs, featuring in over 400 live performances since its debut on October 30, 1985.

== Background ==
"Harry Hood" refers to the Hood Dairy Co., a New England dairy company based in Boston. While the band was living with Brian Long in Burlington, Vermont next to a Hood milk plant, "Harry Hood" was the company mascot of the Hood Milk Co., and this character was featured in a 1970s television commercial in which people opened their refrigerator to find Harry Hood standing inside. The lyric, "Where do you go when the lights go out?" most likely refers to this advertisement, and to the automatic light in a refrigerator. A "Mr. Miner" is also mentioned in the song, a reference to a previous tenant of the house. While living in Mr. Minor's former apartment, calls for Mr. Miner by debt collectors and such would frequently interrupt band rehearsals. For that, the band added the line "Thank You, Mr. Miner."

The music for the song was written during Trey Anastasio and Jon Fishman's 1985 travels in Europe. While on Pelekas Beach in Greece, they took LSD and decided to swim out to a raft just offshore. A violent storm came in and almost drowned Anastasio. After the near-death experience, Trey sat on the beach and wrote the music to "Harry Hood".

== Structure ==
The song opens with a loose reggae section prominently featuring the bass, then moves through several contrasting themes before culminating in an improvised section that begins with a I-V-IV chord progression in D major.

== "Glowstick wars" ==
"Harry Hood" is famous among the band's fans for its association with the spontaneous emergence of "glowstick wars," a Phish-created audience and band interaction in which multicolored glowsticks were tossed from all points in the crowd, such as during the 1997 "Great Went" performance featured in the film Bittersweet Motel.

"Harry Hood" was performed at Phish's supposed "farewell" Coventry two-day gig in 2004 on the rocks in the front of the stage. The rocks were placed in an effort to help control the massive flooding that turned the Coventry event into a muddy mess. Guitarist Trey Anastasio noted that the band was much further away, and so they performed closer to the fans in order to start a conversation among fans who would presumably return to their campsites and discuss whether or not the proximity of the band to the stage affected the "flowage of the notes." At the end, the band stopped playing, allowing the audience to sing the “You can feel good, good, good about Hood” refrain.

== Album appearances ==
Although the song has never appeared on a Phish studio album, concerts performances of the song appear on several of the band's live albums. "Harry Hood" made its first album appearance on the 1995 release A Live One, which includes a performance from an October 1994 concert in Gainesville, Florida. The song subsequently appeared on Hampton Comes Alive (1999; recorded 1998), Live Phish Volume 2 (2001; recorded 1994), Live Phish Volume 9 (2002; recorded 1989), Live Phish Volume 17 (2003; recorded 1998), Live Phish 02.28.03 (recorded and released 2003), Live Phish 04.04.98 (2005; recorded 1998), Colorado '88 (2006; recorded 1988), Vegas 96 (2007; recorded 1996), At the Roxy (2008; recorded 1993), Hampton/Winston-Salem '97 (2011; recorded 1997) and Ventura (2013; recorded 1998). The song has also appeared on concert recordings released by the band through their LivePhish website and on the DVDs Phish: Walnut Creek (released 2008; recorded 1997) and The Clifford Ball (released 2009; recorded 1996).
