= Live Phish 02.28.03 =

Live album by Phish
- Released: 2003
- Recorded: February 28, 2003
- Length: 2:49:44
- Label: Phish Dry Goods
- Producer: Phish

Phish chronology
Live Phish Volume 20 (2003)	Live Phish 02.28.03 (2003)	Live Phish 07.15.03 (2003)

LivePhish.com Downloads series chronology
Live Phish Downloads: 02.26.03 (2003)	Live Phish Downloads: 02.28.03 (2003)	Live Phish Downloads: 03.01.03 (2003)

Alternative covers
- LivePhish.com Downloads cover

Live Phish 2.28.03 is a live album by American rock band Phish. It was recorded February 28, 2003 at the Nassau Coliseum in Uniondale, New York.

This show marks the return of one of the most beloved and requested Phish songs ever – Mike Gordon's "Destiny Unbound" – which had not been played since December 1991. The song's lengthy absence from the rotation fueled its legendary status (much like Grateful Dead's "Unbroken Chain") to the point where fans would go to extreme lengths to encourage the band to perform the song, such as having the entire front row recite the first verse via flyers passed out to concertgoers by eager fans. The performance, having not been performed for the previous 796 shows, was considered the ultimate retirement breakout in the band's history (although at the time, 12 other songs had breakouts with gaps of longer duration. The only original composition among these 12 songs was "The Curtain With", which the band performed on July 12, 2000 after having not performed the song in 1092 consecutive shows).

Aside from the "Destiny Unbound" breakout, exceptional jams in "Bathtub Gin", "Back on the Train", "Tweezer" and "Soul Shakedown Party" helped make this performance one of the most celebrated concert of Phish's post-hiatus "2.0" period (2002–2004). The version of "Tweezer," known to fans as the "Nassau Tweezer," is particularly highlighted as one of the best jams of that era.

This show was also among a small batch of the 2003 live shows to be released in CD form, and marked the first time that "Destiny Unbound" had appeared on an official Phish release.

== Track listing ==
Disc one

Set one:

1. "Birds of a Feather" (Trey Anastasio, Jon Fishman, Mike Gordon, Page McConnell, Tom Marshall) – 8:50
2. "Destiny Unbound" (Gordon) – 7:21
3. "Horn" (Anastasio, Marshall) – 3:38
4. "Bathtub Gin" (Anastasio, Suzanne Goodman) – 21:43
5. "Sleep" (Anastasio, Marshall) – 2:17
6. "Back on the Train" (Anastasio, Marshall) – 12:31
7. "Bouncing Around the Room" (Anastasio, Marshall) – 4:14
8. "Walls of the Cave" (Anastasio, Marshall) – 14:43

Disc two

Set two:

1. "Tweezer" (Anastasio, Fishman, Gordon, McConnell) – 27:08 >
2. "Soul Shakedown Party" (Bob Marley) – 8:16 >
3. "David Bowie" (Anastasio) – 19:02

Disc three

Set two, continued:

1. "Round Room" (Gordon, Joseph Linitz) – 7:17 >
2. "Harry Hood" (Anastasio, Fishman, Gordon, McConnell, Brian Long) – 15:14

Encore:

3. "Contact" (Gordon) – 7:41
4. "Mexican Cousin" (Anastasio, Marshall) – 5:05 >
5. "Tweezer Reprise" (Anastasio, Fishman, Gordon, McConnell) – 4:44

== Personnel ==
- Trey Anastasio - guitars, lead vocals
- Page McConnell - piano, organ, backing vocals
- Mike Gordon - bass, backing vocals, lead vocals on "Destiny Unbound", "Round Room" and "Contact"
- Jon Fishman - drums, backing vocals
