= Live Phish Volume 11 =

Live Phish Vol. 11

Live album by Phish
- Released: April 16, 2002
- Recorded: November 17, 1997
- Genres: Jam band; funk rock; jazz fusion; progressive rock
- Length: 2:28:35; 39:14 (Filler)
- Label: Elektra
- Producer: Phish

Live Phish Series chronology
Live Phish Volume 10 (2002)	Live Phish Volume 11 (2002)	Live Phish Volume 12 (2002)

Professional ratings
Review scores
Source	Rating
Allmusic	3/5 stars

Live Phish Vol. 11 is a live album by American rock band Phish, which was recorded live at the McNichols Sports Arena in Denver, Colorado on November 17, 1997.

The 1997 fall tour will always be remembered by fans as the funky era of Phish, during which the band de-emphasized their often technical approach in favor of more ambient, groove-based jams and extended space improvisations. Some of this was predicated on their transition from a club band, then to medium theaters, and finally to arena rock which required a change in the band's approach and overall sound. This show from Denver was instantly a band and fan favorite, and Phish had plans to release the show as an album long before the Live Phish Series was conceived.

The concert is considered to be one of the best of Phish's career by the band's fans. On the website Phish.net, the largest Phish fan community on the internet, the show is rated the band's sixth best out of the nearly 1500 concerts they have played since 1983.

Bonus tracks include two songs from the concert at Assembly Hall in Champaign, Illinois on November 19, 1997, featuring a 28-minute version of "Wolfman's Brother".

== Track listing ==
=== Disc one ===
Set one:

1. "Tweezer" (Anastasio, Fishman, Gordon, McConnell) - 18:00
2. "Reba" (Anastasio) - 14:09
3. "Train Song" (Gordon, Linitz) - 3:37
4. "Ghost" (Anastasio, Marshall) - 21:24
5. "Fire" (Hendrix) - 5:27

=== Disc two ===
Set two:

1. "Down with Disease" (Anastasio, Marshall) - 16:18
2. "Olivia's Pool" (Anastasio, Marshall) - 2:18
3. "Johnny B. Goode" (Berry) - 5:02
4. "Denver Jam" (Anastasio, Fishman, Gordon, McConnell) - 12:01
5. "Jesus Just Left Chicago" (Beard, Gibbons, Hill) - 14:06
6. "When the Circus Comes To Town" (Hidalgo, Pérez) - 5:16

=== Disc three ===
Set two, continued:

1. "You Enjoy Myself" (Anastasio) - 23:09

Encore:

2. "Character Zero" (Anastasio, Marshall) - 7:48

Filler (November 19, 1997, Assembly Hall, Champaign, Illinois):

3. "Wolfman's Brother" (Anastasio, Fishman, Gordon, Marshall, McConnell) - 28:21
4. "Makisupa Policeman" (Anastasio, Marshall) - 10:53

== Personnel ==
- Trey Anastasio - guitars, lead vocals
- Page McConnell - piano, organ, backing vocals, lead vocals on "Jesus Just Left Chicago"
- Mike Gordon - bass, backing vocals, lead vocals on "Train Song"
- Jon Fishman - drums, backing vocals

== Setlist from the 'Helping Phriendly Book' ==
- 'The Helping Phriendly Book' (HPB) is a detailed setlist archive maintained by fans at phish.net.
- Set 1: Tweezer, Reba^{[1]}, Train Song, Ghost > Fire
- Set 2: Down with Disease^{[2]} -> Olivia's Pool > Johnny B. Goode -> Jesus Just Left Chicago, When the Circus Comes, You Enjoy Myself
- Encore: Character Zero [1] No whistling. [2] Unfinished.
- Teases: · Super Bad tease in Ghost · Dave's Energy Guide tease in Johnny B. Goode
- Noteworthy Jams: Tweezer, Ghost (highly recommended), Johnny B. Goode (highly recommended), Jesus Just Left Chicago (highly recommended), You Enjoy Myself
- Average Song Gap: 8
- Performers: Trey Anastasio, Page McConnell, Jon Fishman, Mike Gordon
- Notes: Reba did not have the whistling ending and Disease was unfinished. Ghost included a Super Bad (James Brown) tease and Johnny B. Goode contained DEG teases. This show was officially released as Live Phish 11.
