= Live Phish Volume 2 =

Live Phish Vol. 2

Live album by Phish
- Released: September 18, 2001
- Recorded: July 16, 1994
- Genre: Rock
- Length: 2:35:22
- Label: Elektra
- Producer: Phish

Live Phish Series chronology
Live Phish Volume 1 (2001)	Live Phish Volume 2 (2001)	Live Phish Volume 3 (2001)

Professional ratings
Review scores
Source	Rating
Allmusic	2.5/5 stars

Live Phish Vol. 2 was recorded live on July 16, 1994, and was released on September 18, 2001, as part of the Live Phish Series. The show was performed on the side of a ski slope at the Sugarbush Resort in the town of North Fayston, located in Phish's home state of Vermont. It was the final concert of the band's highly successful 1994 summer tour. Earlier in the year, the band had released its highest selling album to date (Hoist) and the size of the Phish audience had expanded greatly by the summer. The Sugarbush concert, which included overnight camping on the ski slope under the stars, was slated as the grand finale of the tour.

The concert's setlist included the standard high-energy favorites from 1994 plus a few surprises, including a rare performance of Mike Gordon's "NO2", which appears on the band's 1986 self-titled debut album known as The White Tape (the band would not perform the song for another five years). During "Catapult" there is banter between Trey Anastasio and Jon Fishman after the line "there ain't gonna be no wedding" since Anastasio's wedding was set to occur soon. Also, during the middle of "Harpua", a giant comet could be seen overhead, prompting the band to launch into "Also sprach Zarathustra", better known as the theme to 2001: A Space Odyssey and often simply referred to as "2001". Phish play Eumir Deodato's version of the song from the 1979 movie Being There with Peter Sellers. Deodato's version went platinum.

This release reached a peak of #93 on the Billboard 200 chart. The album marked the first time that longtime Phish concert staples "The Lizards" and "Harpua" appeared on a commercially released compact disc.

== Track listing ==
Disc one

Set one:

1. "Golgi Apparatus" (Trey Anastasio, Tom Marshall, Brian Szuter, Aaron Woolf) – 5:38 →
2. "Down with Disease" (Anastasio, Marshall) – 6:01 →
3. "NO_{2}" (Mike Gordon) – 1:53 →
4. "Stash" (Anastasio, Marshall) – 10:23
5. "The Lizards" (Anastasio) – 9:59
6. "Cavern" (Anastasio, Marshall, Scott Herman) – 4:21 →
7. "The Horse" (Anastasio, Marshall) – 1:38 →
8. "Silent in the Morning" (Anastasio, Marshall) – 4:52 →
9. "Maze" (Anastasio, Marshall) – 10:38 →
10. "Sparkle" (Anastasio, Marshall) – 3:43 →
11. "Sample in a Jar" (Anastasio, Marshall) – 4:57

Disc two

Set two:

1. "Run Like an Antelope" (Anastasio, Marshall, Steve Pollak) – 9:23 →
2. "Catapult" (Gordon) – 1:45 →
3. "Run Like an Antelope" (Anastasio, Marshall, Pollak) – 8:07
4. "Harpua" (Anastasio, Jon Fishman) – 8:14 →
5. "2001" (Richard Strauss) – 3:07 →
6. "Harpua" (Anastasio, Fishman) – 6:11 →
7. "AC/DC Bag" (Anastasio) – 7:47 →
8. "Scent of a Mule" (Gordon) – 8:03

Disc three

Set two, continued:

1. "Harry Hood" (Anastasio, Fishman, Gordon, Page McConnell, Brian Long) – 16:08
2. "Contact" (Gordon) – 6:17 →
3. "Chalk Dust Torture" (Anastasio, Marshall) – 9:28

Encore:

4. "Suzy Greenberg" (Anastasio, Pollak) – 6:50

== Personnel ==
- Trey Anastasio - guitars, lead vocals, narration on "Harpua"
- Page McConnell - piano, organ, backing vocals, lead vocals on "Silent in the Morning"
- Mike Gordon - bass, backing vocals, lead vocals on "NO_{2}", "Catapult", "Scent of a Mule" and "Contact"
- Jon Fishman - drums, backing vocals, vacuum cleaner on "NO_{2}"

== Setlist from Phish.net ==
- Phish.net hosts a detailed setlist archive maintained by fans.

Saturday, 16 July 1994 Summer Stage at Sugarbush, North Fayston, VT

SET 1: Golgi Apparatus > Down with Disease -> NO_{2} > Stash, The Lizards, Cavern > The Horse > Silent in the Morning > Maze > Sparkle > Sample in a Jar

SET 2: Run Like an Antelope -> Catapult -> Run Like an Antelope, Harpua -> 2001 > Harpua > AC/DC Bag > Scent of a Mule, Harry Hood, Contact > Chalk Dust Torture

ENCORE: Suzy Greenberg

Notes: Golgi was preceded by an a cappella line of Back in My Hometown. Down With Disease was unfinished. NO_{2} featured Fishman on vacuum. The sounds were a simulation of a dentist drill and inspired pain. But the track should have been titled N_{2}O for nitrous oxide as used by dentists. Harpua included a narration about the comet that crashed into Jupiter. Antelope included a Simpsons signal and Trey running around the stage with a megaphone. Catapult saw Fishman take a verbal jab at Trey and his upcoming wedding before quickly recanting. Chalk Dust included a Barracuda tease.
