= Live Phish Volume 3 =

Live Phish Vol. 3

Live album by Phish
- Released: September 18, 2001
- Recorded: September 14, 2000
- Venue: Darien Lake Performing Arts Center (Darien)
- Length: 2:22:35
- Label: Elektra
- Producer: Phish

Live Phish Series chronology
Live Phish Volume 2 (2001)	Live Phish Volume 3 (2001)	Live Phish Volume 4 (2001)

Professional ratings
Review scores
Source	Rating
Allmusic	2.5/5 stars

Live Phish Vol. 3 is a live album by American rock band Phish, which was recorded live at the Darien Lake Performing Arts Center in Darien, New York, on September 14, 2000. The show was part of the band's final tour before taking an indefinite extended hiatus three weeks later.

The show is known for three improvisational excursions that made it popular among fans. The first is an extended funk version of "Suzy Greenberg" that closes the first set with an extended jam the likes of which had not been heard since the band rocked the tune with The Giant Country Horns on Halloween 1995. In response to the downpour that ensued during the set break, the band also performed a half-hour version of The Who's "Drowned," at times channeling a Brian Eno-influenced ambient jamming style more common during Phish's 1998-1999 tours. The band followed "Drowned" with an extended performance of Talking Heads' "Crosseyed and Painless," sung by drummer Jon Fishman.

In addition, in a 2001 Relix Magazine interview, Trey Anastasio explained that this show was chosen for the Live Phish Series due to the eclectic first-set song selection and what he considers a standout version of "Carini": "It's a complete metal meltdown. It's the bass and drumming in the background that I really liked. It's really strange. Nobody's playing the beat at all. Those guys are playing in quarter time and the guitar and keyboards are just creating this wash of color on top of this heavy booming."

This is the shortest volume in the Live Phish Series, running just over two hours and twenty minutes. The release reached a peak position of #118 on the Billboard 200 chart. The album marked the first time that concert staples "Punch You in the Eye" and "Carini" had appeared on an official Phish release.

== Track listing ==
Disc one

Set one:

1. "Punch You in the Eye" (Trey Anastasio) – 8:59 →
2. "Reba" (Anastasio) – 13:53
3. "Albuquerque" (Neil Young) – 4:32
4. "Carini" (Anastasio, Jon Fishman, Mike Gordon, Page McConnell) – 11:07
5. "The Oh Kee Pah Ceremony" (Anastasio) – 1:42 →
6. "Suzy Greenberg" (Anastasio, Steve Pollak) – 9:18 →
7. "Darien Jam #1" (Anastasio, Fishman, Gordon, McConnell) – 11:58

Disc two

Set two:

1. "Drowned" (Pete Townshend) – 6:46 →
2. "Darien Jam #2" (Anastasio, Fishman, Gordon, McConnell) – 25:01 →
3. "Crosseyed and Painless" (David Byrne, Brian Eno, Chris Frantz, Jerry Harrison, Tina Weymouth) – 5:42 →
4. "Darien Jam #3" (Anastasio, Fishman, Gordon, McConnell) – 6:12 →
5. "Dog-Faced Boy" (Anastasio, Fishman, McConnell, Tom Marshall) – 2:36

Disc three

Set two, continued:

1. "Prince Caspian" (Anastasio, Marshall) – 11:35 →
2. "Loving Cup" (Mick Jagger, Keith Richards) – 9:58

Encore:

3. "Driver" (Anastasio, Marshall) – 3:48
4. "The Inlaw Josie Wales" (Anastasio) – 3:51
5. "Sample in a Jar" (Anastasio, Marshall) – 5:37

== Personnel ==
- Trey Anastasio - guitars, lead vocals
- Page McConnell - piano, organ, backing vocals, co-lead vocals on "Loving Cup"
- Mike Gordon - bass, backing vocals, lead vocals on "Drowned"
- Jon Fishman - drums, backing vocals

== Setlist from Phish.net ==
Phish.net hosts a detailed setlist archive maintained by fans.

Thursday, 14 September 2000 Darien Lake Performing Arts Center, Darien Center, NY

SET 1: Punch You In the Eye > Reba, Albuquerque, Carini, The Oh Kee Pa Ceremony > Suzy Greenberg > Jam

SET 2: Drowned > Crosseyed and Painless > Dog Faced Boy, Prince Caspian > Loving Cup

ENCORE: Driver, The Inlaw Josie Wales, Sample in a Jar

Notes: Reba did not have the whistling ending.
