= Live Phish Volume 7 =

Live Phish Vol. 7

Live album by Phish
- Released: April 16, 2002
- Recorded: August 14, 1993
- Genre: Rock
- Length: 2:47:48; 29:43 (Filler)
- Label: Elektra
- Producer: Phish

Live Phish Series chronology
Live Phish Volume 6 (2001)	Live Phish Volume 7 (2002)	Live Phish Volume 8 (2002)

Professional ratings
Review scores
Source	Rating
Allmusic	4/5 stars

Live Phish Vol. 7 was recorded live at the World Music Theater in Tinley Park, Illinois, United States, on August 14, 1993.

Almost immediately, this concert became a sought-after collector's item on the Phish bootleg circuit, as it seemed to define an era when Phish began breaking down many of its live performance boundaries. Whereas most shows before 1993 contained a distinct set of songs with specifically placed jams, many concerts in the summer of 1993 saw Phish experimenting with song segues and improvisation within sections of songs that were once tightly structured.

Here, the band floats in and out of "Run Like an Antelope" through most of the second set, switching from on-the-spot instrumental forays to unique and rare cover songs, all within the context of "Run Like an Antelope." Shortly after a massive jam session in "You Enjoy Myself," drummer Jon Fishman provides a bit of comic relief with a performance of Prince's "Purple Rain."

== Track listing ==
=== Disc one ===
Set one:

1. "Chalk Dust Torture" (Anastasio, Marshall) - 6:16
2. "Guelah Papyrus" (Anastasio, Marshall) - 6:07
3. "The Divided Sky" (Anastasio) - 15:01
4. "The Horse" (Anastasio, Marshall) - 2:06
5. "Silent in the Morning" (Anastasio, Marshall) - 4:51
6. "It's Ice" (Anastasio, Marshall) - 9:01
7. "Sparkle" (Anastasio, Marshall) - 3:46
8. "Split Open and Melt" (Anastasio) - 12:35
9. "Esther" (Anastasio) - 8:42
10. "Poor Heart" (Gordon) - 3:02
11. "Cavern" (Anastasio, Herman, Marshall) - 4:30

=== Disc two ===
Set two:

1. "2001" (Deodato) - 4:20
2. "Run Like an Antelope" (Anastasio, Marshall, Pollak) - 12:50
3. "Sparks" (Townshend) - 2:39
4. "Walk Away" (Walsh) - 3:37
5. "Tinley Park Jam" (Anastasio, Fishman, Gordon, McConnell) - 4:21
6. "Run Like an Antelope" (Anastasio, Marshall, Pollak) - 2:14
7. "Have Mercy" (Ferguson, Shaw, Simpson) - 3:05
8. "Run Like an Antelope" (Anastasio, Marshall, Pollak) - 2:00
9. "Mound" (Gordon) - 5:44
10. "The Squirming Coil" (Anastasio, Marshall) - 9:53
11. "Daniel Saw the Stone" (Traditional) - 3:20

=== Disc three ===
Set two, continued:

1. "You Enjoy Myself" (Anastasio) - 20:16
2. "Purple Rain" (Prince) - 6:52
3. "Golgi Apparatus" (Anastasio, Marshall, Szuter, Woolf) - 5:42

Encore:

4. "La Grange" (Beard, Gibbons, Hill) - 4:58

Filler (August 11, 1993, Club Eastbrook, Grand Rapids, Michigan):

5. "Mike's Song" (Gordon) - 12:19
6. "The Great Gig in the Sky" (Torry, Wright) - 5:27
7. "Weekapaug Groove" (Anastasio, Fishman, Gordon, McConnell) - 11:57

== Personnel ==
- Trey Anastasio - guitars, acoustic guitar on "The Horse", backing vocals
- Page McConnell - piano, organ, backing vocals, lead vocals on "Silent in the Morning", "It's Ice" and "Walk Away"
- Mike Gordon - bass, backing vocals, lead vocals on "Poor Heart", "Mound" and "Mike's Song"
- Jon Fishman - drums, backing vocals, lead vocals on "Purple Rain" and "The Great Gig in the Sky"
