= Vegas 96 =

Live album by Phish
- Released: November 20, 2007 (US)
- Recorded: December 6, 1996
- Genre: Rock
- Label: JEMP
- Producer: Phish

Phish chronology
| Colorado '88 (2006 - recorded live in 1988) (2004) | Vegas 96 (2007) | At the Roxy (2008) |

Professional ratings
Review scores
| Source | Rating |
|---|---|
| Rolling Stone | 3/5 stars |

Vegas 96 is a triple live album from the American jam band Phish, recorded live at the Aladdin Theatre in Las Vegas, Nevada, on December 6, 1996. In addition to the 3-CD set, a limited edition box version also includes a DVD with archival footage from the show and an extensive 40-page bound-book featuring photos and notes.

The show features a large amount of extended improvisation on Phish classics such as "Harry Hood" and "Weekapaug Groove", as well as a cover of Frank Zappa's "Peaches en Regalia". The encore features a half-hour version of "Harpua" with guest appearances from Les Claypool and Larry LaLonde of the band Primus, actor Courtney Gains from Children of the Corn, a group of Elvis impersonators, and a pair known as the "Yodeling Cowgirls", who performed "I Want to Be a Cowboy's Sweetheart", accompanied by John McEuen of the Nitty Gritty Dirt Band on a pedal-steel guitar.

The Yodeling Cowgirls, from Phoenix, Arizona, are Heather August and Anamieke Carrozza, who had met Phish at their Phoenix concert days earlier.

In addition to being a CD release, this concert is available as a download in FLAC and MP3 formats at LivePhish.com. Selected songs are available for MPEG-4 download.

== Track listing ==
Disc one

Set one:

1. "Wilson" (Trey Anastasio, Tom Marshall, Aaron Woolf) – 6:22
2. "Peaches en Regalia" (Frank Zappa) – 3:10 →
3. "Poor Heart" (Mike Gordon) – 3:18 →
4. "2001" (Eumir Deodato) – 9:27 →
5. "Llama" (Anastasio) – 5:26
6. "You Enjoy Myself" (Anastasio) – 26:00
7. "Cars Trucks Buses" (Page McConnell) – 4:09 →
8. "Down with Disease" (Anastasio, Marshall) – 11:04 →
9. "Frankenstein" (Edgar Winter) – 4:55

Disc two

Set two:

1. "Julius" (Anastasio, Marshall) – 9:34
2. "Sparkle" (Anastasio, Marshall) – 3:37 →
3. "Mike's Song" (Gordon) – 10:53 →
4. "Simple" (Gordon) – 18:33 →
5. "Harry Hood" (Anastasio, Jon Fishman, Gordon, McConnell, Brian Long) – 15:40 →
6. "Weekapaug Groove" (Anastasio, Fishman, Gordon, McConnell) – 11:35
7. "Sweet Adeline" (Henry W. Armstrong, Richard Gerard) – 1:54
8. "Good Times Bad Times" (John Bonham, John Paul Jones, Jimmy Page, Robert Plant) – 7:18

Disc three

Encore:

1. "Harpua" (Anastasio, Fishman) – 4:03 →
2. "Wildwood Weed" (Don Bowman) – 2:43 →
3. "Harpua" (Anastasio, Fishman) – 4:21
4. "I Want to Be a Cowboy's Sweetheart" (Patsy Montana) – 2:17 →
5. "Harpua" (Anastasio, Fishman) – 1:55 →
6. "Suspicious Minds" (Mark James) – 4:28 →
7. "Harpua" (Anastasio, Fishman) – 8:47 →
8. "Suzy Greenberg" (Anastasio, Steve Pollak) – 6:52 →
9. "Susie Q" (Dale Hawkins, Robert Chaisson, Stan Lewis, Eleanor Broadwater) – 2:47

=== Bonus disc - Road to Vegas ===
1. "Split Open and Melt" (Anastasio) - 11:04
  - recorded November 9, 1996
2. "Tweezer" (Anastasio, Fishman, Gordon, McConnell) - 16:58
  - recorded November 3, 1996
3. "Bathtub Gin" (Anastasio, Goodman) - 26:31
  - recorded November 7, 1996
4. "Simple" (Gordon) - 16:37
  - recorded November 18, 1996
5. "Amazing Grace" (Traditional) - 6:07
  - recorded November 30, 1996

== Personnel ==
Phish

- Trey Anastasio - guitars, lead vocals, acapella vocals on "Sweet Adeline"
- Page McConnell - keyboards, backing vocals, acapella vocals on "Sweet Adeline"
- Mike Gordon - bass guitar, backing vocals, lead vocals on "Poor Heart" and "Mike's Song", acapella vocals on "Sweet Adeline"
- Jon Fishman - drums, backing vocals, acapella vocals on "Sweet Adeline"

=== Guests ===
- Les Claypool - bass guitar on "Harpua", "Wildwood Weed", "Suspicious Minds", "Suzy Greenberg" and "Susie Q", lead vocals on "Wildwood Weed"
- Larry LaLonde - guitar on "Harpua", "Wildwood Weed", "Suspicious Minds", "Suzy Greenberg" and "Susie Q"
- John McEuen - slide guitar on "I Want to Be a Cowboy's Sweetheart"
- Heather August and Anamieke Carrozza - vocals on "I Want to Be a Cowboy's Sweetheart"
- Courtney Gains - percussion on "Suzy Greenberg"

=== Guests on Road to Vegas ===
- Karl Perazzo - percussion on "Tweezer"
- Peter Apfelbaum - tenor saxophone on "Amazing Grace"
- John McEuen - slide guitar on "Amazing Grace"
