= It (Phish video) =

- Directed by: Mary Wharton
- Starring: Phish
- Cinematography: Charles Libin
- Edited by: Alexander Hall; Thom Zimny
- Release date: October 12, 2004

It is a two-disc DVD set chronicling Phish's two-day summer festival in Limestone, Maine on August 2–3, 2003. The first disc contains a full-length documentary originally aired on PBS in 2004, featuring interviews with the band, song excerpts, and images from the concert grounds and festival events. This was the sixth of ten major outdoor summer festivals held by Phish.

The second disc features complete performances of ten songs from the festival. It does not contain the entire festival, nor any of the concerts they played there, in their uninterrupted entirety.

The DVD set, which clocks in at over four hours, was certified platinum in 2005.

== Track listing ==
=== Disc one ===
Phish: It's a PBS concert special (documentary)

1. "What is IT?" (Good Times, Bad Times ending)
2. "46 Days"
3. "Birds of a Feather"
4. "Sunk City" (Punch You In The Eye)
5. "David Bowie"
6. "46 Days Jam"
7. "Ghost Jam"
8. "Chalk Dust Torture"
9. "The Tower (Tower Jam Set)"
10. "Bug"
11. "You Enjoy Myself"
12. "Rock and Roll"
13. "Run like an Antelope"
14. "The Lizards" (Ending/Credits)

=== Disc two ===
1. "Reba"
2. "Limb By Limb"
3. "Chalk Dust Torture"
4. "NICU"
5. "Waves"
6. "David Bowie"
7. "Seven Below"
8. "Pebbles and Marbles"
9. "Julius"
10. "The Lizards"

== Personnel ==
Phish

- Trey Anastasio - guitar, vocals
- Jon Fishman - drums, vocals
- Mike Gordon - bass, vocals
- Page McConnell - piano, vocals
