= Live Phish Volume 6 =

Live Phish Vol. 6

Live album by Phish
- Released: October 30, 2001
- Recorded: November 27, 1998
- Genre: Rock
- Length: 2:55:56
- Label: Elektra
- Producer: Phish

Live Phish Series chronology
Live Phish Volume 5 (2001)	Live Phish Volume 6 (2001)	Live Phish Volume 7 (2002)

Professional ratings
Review scores
Source	Rating
Allmusic	3/5 stars

Live Phish Vol. 6 is a live album by American rock band Phish, which was recorded live on the first night of a three night stand at the Worcester Centrum in Worcester, Massachusetts, on November 27, 1998.

The show is best known for its repeated relapses into the classic Surfaris favorite "Wipeout," which made two appearances by itself during the concert and one during the middle of "Weekapaug Groove." The band was extremely loose and playful on this night, launching into a spontaneous version of The English Beat's 1980 ska hit "Mirror in the Bathroom" while still in the middle of "Chalk Dust Torture," and also breaking out the only blues version of "Dog Log" in the song's history.

Also, the band extended the ending of "Weekapaug Groove" into its own individual jam, resulting in the entire "Weekapaug Groove" segment clocking in at over twenty minutes.

This concert remains one of Phish's most popular performances from the 1998 fall tour.

Live Phish Vol. 6 marked the first time that "Runaway Jim" had appeared on an official Phish release, despite having been part of the band's concert repertoire since 1990. "Vultures", "Buried Alive", "Dog Log", "I Am Hydrogen", "Buffalo Bill" and the band's cover of The Mustangs' "Ya Mar" all also made their debut on a commercially available Phish recording.

== Track listing ==
=== Disc one ===
Set one:

1. "Funky Bitch" (Seals) - 6:56
2. "Ya Mar" (Ferguson) - 10:40
3. "Carini" (Anastasio, Fishman, Gordon, McConnell) - 5:51
4. "Runaway Jim" (Abrahams, Anastasio) - 9:21
5. "Meat" (Anastasio, Fishman, Gordon, Marshall, McConnell) - 4:52
6. "Reba" (Anastasio) - 15:48
7. "Old Home Place" (Jayne, Webb) - 3:58
8. "Dogs Stole Things" (Anastasio, Marshall) - 4:39

=== Disc two ===
Set one, continued:

1. "Vultures" (Anastasio, Herman, Marshall) - 7:13
2. "When the Circus Comes" (Hidalgo, Pérez) - 5:29
3. "Birds of a Feather" (Anastasio, Fishman, Gordon, Marshall, McConnell) - 9:01

Set two:

4. "Buried Alive" (Anastasio) - 3:37
5. "Wipeout" (Berryhill, Connolly, Fuller, Wilson) - 2:01
6. "Chalk Dust Torture" (Anastasio, Marshall) - 3:33
7. "Mirror in the Bathroom" (Charlery, Cox, Morton, Steele, Wakeling) - 0:58
8. "Chalk Dust Torture" (Anastasio, Marshall) - 4:09
9. "Dog Log" (Anastasio) - 2:46
10. "Sanity" (Anastasio, Fishman, Gordon, McConnell, Pollak) - 4:52
11. "Buffalo Bill" (Anastasio, Marshall) - 3:35

=== Disc three ===
Set two, continued:

1. "Mike's Song" (Gordon) - 10:28
2. "I Am Hydrogen" (Anastasio, Daubert, Marshall) - 6:48
3. "Weekapaug Groove" (Anastasio, Fishman, Gordon, McConnell) - 20:13
4. "Run Like an Antelope" (Anastasio, Marshall, Pollak) - 15:47

Encore:

5. "Wading in the Velvet Sea" (Anastasio, Marshall) - 6:47
6. "Golgi Apparatus" (Anastasio, Marshall, Szuter, Woolf) - 4:33
7. "Wipeout" (Berryhill, Connolly, Fuller, Wilson) - 2:02

== Personnel ==
- Trey Anastasio - guitars, lead vocals
- Page McConnell - piano, organ, backing vocals, lead vocals on "Wading in the Velvet Sea"
- Mike Gordon - bass, backing vocals, lead vocals on "Funky Bitch", "Ya Mar", "Old Home Place" and "Mike's Song"
- Jon Fishman - drums, backing vocals

== Setlist from the 'Helping Phriendly Book' ==
- 'The Helping Phriendly Book' (HPB) is a detailed setlist archive maintained by fans at phish.net.

Friday, 27 November 1998 Worcester Centrum Centre, Worcester, MA

SET 1: Funky Bitch, Ya Mar, Carini, Runaway Jim, Meat, Reba*, The Old Home Place, Dogs Stole Things, Vultures, When the Circus Comes, Birds of a Feather (1:23)

SET 2: Buried Alive, Wipe Out+, Chalk Dust Torture** > Mirror in the Bathroom# > Chalk Dust Torture > Dog Log## > Chalk Dust Torture > Sanity, Buffalo Bill, Mike's Song^ > I Am Hydrogen > Weekapaug Groove^^, Run Like an Antelope (1:18)

ENCORE: Wading in the Velvet Sea, Golgi Apparatus > Wipe Out+ (0:13)

*With whistling. +Trey introduced Fish. **With "Wipe Out" teases. #First time played (The Beat (later known as The English Beat) cover from their debut LP "I Just Can't Stop It"); two verses played. ##Possibly inspired by a dog show taking place next door to the Centrum; very bluesy. ^With ambient jamming. ^^With recurring "Wipe Out" jamming and ambient jamming (especially in the latter portion). +After a drum solo by Fish, Trey introduced him again and then they finished "Wipe Out."
