= Live Phish Volume 5 =

Live Phish Vol. 5

Live album by Phish
- Released: September 18, 2001
- Recorded: July 8, 2000
- Length: 2:32:17
- Label: Elektra
- Producer: Phish

Live Phish Series chronology
Live Phish Volume 4 (2001)	Live Phish Volume 5 (2001)	Live Phish Volume 6 (2001)

Professional ratings
Review scores
Source	Rating
Allmusic	2.5/5 stars

Live Phish Vol. 5 is a live album by American rock band Phish, which was recorded live at Alpine Valley in East Troy, Wisconsin, a small town that is located 40 miles (64 km) southwest of Milwaukee on July 8, 2000.

At the time of its release, the album received a mixed reaction from fans, as it seemed to be a rather standard Phish concert compared to other shows from the band's 2000 summer tour. Moreover, the band was known for playing a special setlist of songs at Alpine Valley, ranging from rare covers and first-time performances.

Regardless of the somewhat basic setlist, the band embarks on several improvisational flights, including the 15-minute "Piper" and an extended, bluesy solo from Trey Anastasio on an 11-minute version of Jeff Holdsworth's "Possum".

Three months later, the band would take an indefinite hiatus from recording and touring. They returned for a New Year's Eve performance in 2002 at Madison Square Garden (NY, NY), MSG being their home venue for past and present NYE throwdowns.

== Track listing ==
=== Disc one ===
Set one:

1. "Punch You in the Eye" (Anastasio) - 8:53
2. "NICU" (Anastasio, Marshall) - 5:28
3. "My Soul" (Chenier) - 7:43
4. "Poor Heart" (Gordon) - 2:57
5. "Wolfman's Brother" (Anastasio, Fishman, Gordon, Marshall, McConnell) - 9:50
6. "First Tube" (Anastasio, Lawton, Markellis) - 8:14
7. "Llama" (Anastasio) - 5:21
8. "Guyute" (Anastasio, Marshall) - 10:30
9. "Run Like an Antelope" (Anastasio, Marshall, Pollak) - 13:48

=== Disc two ===
Set two:

1. "Heavy Things" (Anastasio, Herman, Marshall) - 5:36
2. "Piper" (Anastasio, Marshall) - 14:49
3. "Rock & Roll" (Reed) - 7:08
4. "Tweezer" (Anastasio, Fishman, Gordon, McConnell) - 11:42
5. "Walk Away" (Walsh) - 3:48

=== Disc three ===
Set two, continued:

1. "Twist" (Anastasio, Marshall) - 9:53
2. "The Horse" (Anastasio, Marshall) - 0:48
3. "Silent in the Morning" (Anastasio, Marshall) - 5:11
4. "Possum" (Holdsworth) - 11:06

Encore:

5. "Suzy Greenberg" (Anastasio, Pollak) - 5:04
6. "Tweezer Reprise" (Anastasio, Fishman, Gordon, McConnell) - 4:28

== Personnel ==
- Trey Anastasio - guitars, lead vocals
- Page McConnell - piano, organ, backing vocals, lead vocals on "Rock & Roll", "Walk Away" and "Silent in the Morning"
- Mike Gordon - bass, backing vocals, lead vocals on "Poor Heart" and "Possum"
- Jon Fishman - drums, backing vocals
