= The Gorge '98 =

Live album by Phish
- Released: December 9, 2022
- Recorded: July 16–17, 1998
- Venue: The Gorge Amphitheatre (Grant County, Washington)
- Genre: Jam band
- Length: 323:03
- Label: JEMP
- Producer: Phish

Phish chronology
Get More Down (2022)	The Gorge '98 (2022)	LP on LP 04 (2023)

The Gorge '98 is a live box set by Vermont-based jam band Phish. Released on December 9, 2022, it documents their performances at the Gorge Amphitheatre in Grant County, Washington on July 16 and 17, 1998.

== Background ==
The band's summer 1998 tour saw them add songs into their repertoire that would later be included on that year's The Story of the Ghost album (including setlist staples "Roggae" and "The Moma Dance", (Note: An early version of "The Moma Dance" without lyrics, entitled "Black-Eyed Katy" was performed by the band throughout November and December of 1997.) the latter of which was performed during the second set of the July 16 show) and continue the funk-influenced improvisational style that came to the forefront the previous year. Additionally, the 1997-1998 era saw the band's jams increase in their average length by a wide margin, exemplified by the second set of the July 17 show, which lasts over an hour despite being made up of only four songs.

Other shows from the band's summer '98 tour appear on Live Phish Volume 17, Ventura, and Star Lake '98.

Songs performed during these shows include an extended jam on the normally-compact "Tube" on July 16, and the band's longest ever performance of "Also sprach Zarathustra" (entitled "2001" on Phish releases) on July 17. Additionally, performances from the soundcheck of the July 16 concert are included as filler on the third disc.

Performances of "Tube" → "Slave to the Traffic Light" from July 16 and "Divided Sky" from July 17 were posted on the band's official YouTube channel in October to promote the release.

== Track listing ==
=== July 16 ===
Disc one

Set one:

1. "The Squirming Coil" (Trey Anastasio, Tom Marshall) – 11:17
2. "NICU" (Anastasio, Marshall) – 5:51
3. "Stash" (Anastasio, Marshall) – 13:02
4. "Reba" (Note: No whistling.) (Anastasio) – 17:04 →
5. "Fast Enough for You" (Anastasio, Marshall) – 7:23 →
6. "When the Circus Comes" (David Hidalgo, Louie Pérez) – 4:56
7. "Run Like an Antelope" (Anastasio, Marshall, Steve Pollak) – 13:47

Disc two

Set two:

1. "Julius" (Anastasio, Marshall) – 12:20
2. "The Moma Dance" (Anastasio, Jon Fishman, Mike Gordon, Page McConnell, Marshall) – 11:58 →
3. "Piper" (Anastasio, Marshall) – 7:56
4. "Axilla" (Anastasio, Marshall, Scott Herman) – 5:49 →
5. "David Bowie" (Anastasio) – 19:13

Disc three

Set two, continued:

1. "Tube" (Anastasio, Fishman) – 10:04 →
2. "Slave to the Traffic Light" (Anastasio, Dave Abrahams, Pollak) – 13:26

Encore:

3. "Sample in a Jar" (Anastasio, Marshall) – 5:51

Soundcheck:

4. "Gorge '98 Soundcheck Jam" (Anastasio, Fishman, Gordon, McConnell) – 11:03 →
5. "Dog Log" (Anastasio) – 5:39

=== July 17 ===
Disc four

Set one:

1. "Makisupa Policeman" (Anastasio, Marshall) – 7:25 →
2. "Ya Mar" (Cyril Ferguson) – 13:05
3. "Gumbo" (Anastasio, Fishman) – 12:34
4. "Divided Sky" (Anastasio) – 17:31
5. "Waste" (Anastasio, Marshall) – 7:15 →
6. "My Mind's Got a Mind of its Own" (Butch Hancock) – 2:30 →
7. "My Soul" (Clifton Chenier) – 8:22

Disc five

Set two:

1. "2001" (Richard Strauss) – 24:49 →
2. "Mike's Song" (Gordon) – 18:39 →
3. "Weekapaug Groove" (Note: Unfinished.) (Anastasio, Fishman, Gordon, McConnell) – 13:23 →
4. "Character Zero" (Anastasio, Marshall) – 9:21

Encore:

5. "Punch You in the Eye" (Anastasio) – 8:20 →
6. "Rocky Top" (Felice Bryant, Boudleaux Bryant) – 3:10

== Personnel ==
- Trey Anastasio – guitar, lead vocals, backing vocals
- Mike Gordon – bass, backing vocals, lead vocals ("Ya Mar", "My Mind's Got a Mind of its Own", "Mike's Song", "Rocky Top")
- Jon Fishman – drums, backing vocals, lead vocals ("The Moma Dance")
- Page McConnell – keyboards, piano, backing vocals
