= Live Phish Volume 9 =

Live Phish Vol. 9

Live album by Phish
- Released: April 16, 2002
- Recorded: August 26, 1989
- Genre: Rock
- Length: 3:10:54
- Label: Elektra
- Producer: Phish

Live Phish Series chronology
Live Phish Volume 8 (2002)	Live Phish Volume 9 (2002)	Live Phish Volume 10 (2002)

Professional ratings
Review scores
Source	Rating
Allmusic	3.5/5 stars

Live Phish Vol. 9 was recorded live at the Townshend Family Park in Townshend, Vermont on August 26, 1989.

When the band begin choosing concerts for the Live Phish Series, guitarist Trey Anastasio required at least one release from the 1980s. This three-set concert, performed late on a summer afternoon in August, seems to be the most fitting representation of 1980s Phish since almost all of the band's concert staples from the era are represented. Live Phish Vol. 9 marked the first time that "Colonel Forbin's Ascent", "Fly Famous Mockingbird", "McGrupp and the Watchful Hosemasters" (as filler), and "The Man Who Stepped Into Yesterday" had appeared on a commercially available Phish release.

This 1989 show saw Phish enmeshed in a progressive rock phase, as many multi-part epics and large scale compositions are littered throughout, beginning with the show-opening "Fluffhead" suite. At the end of the second set, Anastasio announces that the band is going to "let the sun go down a little" before returning to the stage for the final set, which ends with a blazing version of ZZ Top's "La Grange ."

This concert, one of the longest Phish concerts of 1989, is seen by many fans as a defining record of the band's tightly-structured progressive rock period.

== Track listing ==
=== Disc one ===
Set one:

1. "Fluffhead" (Anastasio, Pollak) - 15:23
2. "Colonel Forbin's Ascent" (Anastasio) - 7:13
3. "Fly Famous Mockingbird" (Anastasio) - 7:20
4. "Harry Hood" (Anastasio, Fishman, Gordon, Long, McConnell) - 10:21
5. "Split Open and Melt" (Anastasio) - 7:13
6. "The Divided Sky" (Anastasio) - 12:08

=== Disc two ===
Set one, continued:

1. "You Enjoy Myself" (Anastasio) - 14:50
2. "Possum" (Holdsworth) - 7:18

Set two:

3. "Andy Griffith Theme" (Hagen, Spencer) - 1:53
4. "Bold as Love" (Hendrix) - 4:59
5. "Ya Mar" (Ferguson) - 6:34
6. "Slave to the Traffic Light" (Abrahams, Anastasio, Pollak) - 6:20
7. "AC/DC Bag" (Anastasio) - 6:41
8. "Donna Lee" (Parker) - 4:29
9. "Funky Bitch" (Seals) - 5:09
10. "Foam" (Anastasio) - 6:34

=== Disc three ===
Set two, continued:

1. "David Bowie" (Anastasio) - 14:45

Set three:

2. "The Man Who Stepped Into Yesterday" (Anastasio) - 3:31
3. "Avenu Malcanu" (Traditional) - 3:32
4. "Suzy Greenberg" (Anastasio, Pollak) - 6:20
5. "Dinner and a Movie" (Anastasio, Pollak) - 3:57
6. "Run Like an Antelope" (Anastasio, Marshall, Pollak) - 13:47

Encore:

7. "Contact" (Gordon) - 6:12
8. "The Lizards" (Anastasio) - 9:35
9. "La Grange" (Beard, Gibbons, Hill) - 4:50

Filler from 9/12/89:

1. "McGrupp and the Watchful Hosemasters" (Anastasio, Marshall) - 9:29

== Personnel ==
- Trey Anastasio - guitars, lead vocals, narration on "Fly Famous Mockingbird"
- Page McConnell - organ, backing vocals, lead vocals on "Bold as Love"
- Mike Gordon - bass, backing vocals, lead vocals on "Possum", "Funky Bitch" and "Contact"
- Jon Fishman - drums, backing vocals
