= LP on LP =

Series of records by Phish

LP on LP (Live Phish on Long Play) is a series of live albums by Vermont-based jam band Phish. The albums contain highlights from different Phish concerts, released on vinyl records. Due to the length of the typical Phish jam, all the albums so far have featured only one or two songs. Eight volumes have been released thus far, with the first two being released on June 18, 2021, the third on August 5, 2022, the fourth on January 13, 2023, the fifth and sixth on February 7, 2025, and the seventh and eighth released on November 20, 2026.

== LP on LP 01 ==
LP on LP 01

Live album by Phish
- Released: June 18, 2021
- Recorded: July 14, 2019
- Venue: Alpine Valley Music Theatre (East Troy, Wisconsin)
- Genre: Jam band
- Length: 38:46
- Label: JEMP
- Producer: Phish

Phish chronology
Sigma Oasis (2020)	LP on LP 01 (2021)	LP on LP 02 (2021)

The first release in the series, LP on LP 01, contains a performance of "Ruby Waves" recorded on July 14, 2019, during a concert at Alpine Valley Music Theatre in East Troy, Wisconsin. "Ruby Waves" first appeared on Ghosts of the Forest, a side project by Phish guitarist Trey Anastasio, and the 38-minute-plus version featured here is one of Phish's all-time longest jams. Made up of several distinct movements, the jam became known by fans as the "Alpine 'Ruby Waves'" and is the longest singular performance of the band's "3.0" era. The album was pressed on "ruby waves" colored vinyl. LP on LP 01 reached number 134 on the Billboard 200 and topped the magazine's Vinyl Albums chart.

=== Track listing ===
All tracks written by Trey Anastasio.

Side one

1. "Ruby Waves" – 20:24

Side two

1. "Ruby Waves (cont'd)" – 18:22

== LP on LP 02 ==
LP on LP 02

Live album by Phish
- Released: June 18, 2021
- Recorded: May 26, 2011
- Venue: Bethel Woods Center for the Arts (Bethel, New York)
- Genre: Jam band
- Length: 28:38
- Label: JEMP
- Producer: Phish

Phish chronology
LP on LP 01 (2021)	LP on LP 02 (2021)	The Clifford Ball (2022)

The second release in the series, LP on LP 02, contains a performance of "Waves" recorded on May 26, 2011, at Bethel Woods Center for the Arts in Bethel, New York. The jam, which quotes elements of John Coltrane's A Love Supreme, was not performed in front of an audience; rather it was the tech rehearsal for the band's run at the New York venue. LP on LP 02 reached number 138 on the Billboard 200 and number two on the Vinyl Albums chart.

=== Track listing ===
All tracks written by Anastasio, Scott Herman, and Tom Marshall.

Side one

1. "Waves" – 14:15

Side two

1. "Waves (cont'd)" – 14:23

== LP on LP 03 ==
LP on LP 03

Live album by Phish
- Released: August 5, 2022
- Recorded: August 22, 2015
- Venue: Watkins Glen International (Watkins Glen, New York)
- Genre: Jam band
- Length: 34:40
- Label: JEMP
- Producer: Phish

Phish chronology
The Clifford Ball (2022)	LP on LP 03 (2022)	Get More Down (2022)

LP on LP 03 contains a performance of "Tweezer" → "Prince Caspian" recorded on August 22, 2015, at Watkins Glen International in Watkins Glen, New York, as part of the band's "Magnaball" festival. The first in the series to contain more than one song, it was released on August 5, 2022, and was pressed on purple and light-blue "ferris wheel" colored vinyl. The release was less successful than the previous two installments, missing the Billboard 200 completely, but did reach number five on the Vinyl Albums chart.

=== Track listing ===
Side one

1. "Tweezer" (Anastasio, Jon Fishman, Mike Gordon, Page McConnell) – 17:52 →

Side two

1. "Prince Caspian" (Anastasio, Marshall) – 16:48

== LP on LP 04 ==
LP on LP 04

Live album by Phish
- Released: January 13, 2023
- Recorded: May 22, 2000
- Venues: Radio City Music Hall (New York, New York)
- Genre: Jam band
- Length: 28:02
- Label: JEMP
- Producer: Phish

Phish chronology
The Gorge '98 (2022)	LP on LP 04 (2023)	The Spectrum '97 (2024)

LP on LP 04 was released on January 13, 2023, and contains the band's performance of "Ghost" from Radio City Music Hall in New York, New York on May 22, 2000. The release is the first in the series to come from a show occurring before the band's hiatus and 2004 breakup. Clocking in at just over 28 minutes, it is the shortest release in the series thus far.

=== Track listing ===
All songs written by Anastasio and Marshall.

Side one

1. "Ghost" – 16:10

Side two

1. "Ghost (cont'd)" – 11:52

== LP on LP 05 ==
LP on LP 05

Live album by Phish
- Released: February 7, 2025
- Recorded: April 2, 1998
- Venues: Nassau Coliseum (Uniondale, New York)
- Genre: Jam band
- Length: 38:38
- Label: JEMP
- Producer: Phish

Phish chronology
The Spectrum '97 (2024)	LP on LP 05 (2025)	LP on LP 06 (2025)

LP on LP 05 was released on February 7, 2025, in conjunction with LP on LP 06. It contains performances of the songs "Twist" and "Stash" from the band's April 2, 1998 show at the Nassau Coliseum in Uniondale, New York. The show was the first of the four night "Island Tour". The entire show was previously released as Live Phish 04.02.98. Coming from 1998, LP on LP 05 is the oldest recording released in the series thus far.

=== Track listing ===
All songs written by Anastasio and Marshall.

Side one

1. "Twist" – 18:45

Side two

1. "Stash" – 19:53

== LP on LP 06 ==
LP on LP 06

Live album by Phish
- Released: February 7, 2025
- Recorded: August 6, 2021
- Venues: Ruoff Music Center (Noblesville, Indiana)
- Genre: Jam band
- Length: 51:23
- Label: JEMP
- Producer: Phish

Phish chronology
LP on LP 05 (2024)	LP on LP 06 (2025)

LP on LP 06 was released on February 7, 2025, in conjunction with LP on LP 05. It contains performances of the songs "Simple" and "Blaze On" from the band's August 6, 2021 concert at the Ruoff Music Center in Noblesville, Indiana. Clocking in at over 50 minutes, it is the longest release in the series so far. This performance of "Blaze On" is the longest performance of the song to date.

=== Track listing ===
Side one

1. "Simple" (Gordon) – 23:43

Side two

1. "Blaze On" (Anastasio, Marshall) – 27:40

== LP on LP 07 ==
LP on LP 07

Live album by Phish
- Released: November 20, 2026
- Recorded: November 28, 1994
- Venues: Field House (Bozeman, Montana)
- Genre: Jam band
- Length: 45:10
- Label: JEMP
- Producer: Phish

Phish chronology
LP on LP 06 (2025)	LP on LP 07 (2026)

LP on LP 07 was released on November 20, 2026, in conjunction with LP on LP 08. It contains a performance of the song "Tweezer" from the band's November 28, 1994 concert at the Field House at Montana State University in Bozeman, MT. A snippet of this performance as included on the 1995 album A Live One as "Montana."

=== Track listing ===
Side one

1. "Tweezer" (Phish) – 23:40

Side two

1. "Tweezer" (Phish) – 20:30

== LP on LP 08 ==
LP on LP 08

Live album by Phish
- Released: November 20, 2026
- Recorded: September 14, 1999
- Venues: BSU Pavilion (Boise, Idaho)
- Genre: Jam band
- Length: 47:47
- Label: JEMP
- Producer: Phish

Phish chronology
LP on LP 07 (2026)	LP on LP 08 (2026)

LP on LP 08 was released on November 20, 2026, in conjunction with LP on LP 07. It contains a performance of the songs "AC/DC Bag" and "Gumbo" from the band's September 14, 1999 concert at the BSU Pavilion in Boise, ID. The song performance of AC/DC Bag is well known enough among fans that it came to be know as the "Bowie Bag."

=== Track listing ===
Side one

1. "AC/DC Bag" (Anastasio) – 24:15

Side two

1. "Gumbo" (Anastasio, Fishman) – 13:32

== Personnel ==
- Trey Anastasio – guitar, vocals
- Mike Gordon – bass, vocals
- Jon Fishman – drums, vocals
- Page McConnell – piano, keyboards, vocals
