= Live Phish Downloads: Headphones Jam =

Live album by Phish
- Released: January 16, 2007
- Recorded: February 2004
- Genre: Rock
- Length: 47:32

LivePhish.com Downloads series chronology
Live Phish Downloads: 12.29.97 (2006)	Live Phish Downloads: Headphones Jam (2007)	Live Phish Downloads: 11.14.95 (2007)

Headphones Jam is an in-studio improvisational jam session by the American rock band Phish, recorded during sessions for the band's 2004 album Undermind.

Like The Siket Disc and The Victor Disc (unreleased), the Headphones Jam provides a snapshot of Phish's creative process during a particular period in the band's recording career. The Headphones Jam is unique because the session was released in its unedited entirety.

The Jam was recorded with producer Tchad Blake in The Barn, frontman Trey Anastasio's studio, and so named because it was captured while the monitors (in this case headphones) settings were dialed in for the session. Two excerpts from the Headphones Jam were used for the Undermind album: "Maggie's Revenge" and "Tiny" (an internet-only bonus track).

The Jam was first presented in November 2006 to the winner of the Phish / Sirius "Live in Brooklyn" Barn Tour Contest. The contest winner was given the option to hold on to the track or share it with the rest of the community. The winner decided to make the jam available to the public and asked LivePhish.com to help distribute it, requesting that proceeds be donated to a designated charity, the Ocean's Harbor House.

The Headphones Jam won the Jammy Award for Download of the Year, 2008.

This studio jam is available as a download in FLAC and MP3 formats at LivePhish.com.

== Track listing ==
1. "Headphones Jam" (Anastasio, Fishman, Gordon, McConnell) - 47:32

== Personnel ==
Phish

- Trey Anastasio - guitars, vocals
- Page McConnell - piano, organ, vocals
- Mike Gordon - bass, vocals
- Jon Fishman - drums, vocals
