= You Enjoy Myself =

Song by Phish

from the album Junta
- Released: 1988
- Genre: Jazz fusion; funk rock; progressive rock; jam
- Length: 9:47
- Songwriter: Trey Anastasio
- Producer: Phish

"You Enjoy Myself", commonly abbreviated to "YEM", is a Phish song written by Trey Anastasio from their 1988 debut album Junta. It is the band's most frequently performed song.

== History ==
Trey Anastasio wrote "You Enjoy Myself" in Florence, Italy, in the midst of a European busking trip. The title came from an Italian man befriended by Anastasio and Jon Fishman, who wrapped his arms around them near the Uffizi museum and exclaimed: "You know, when I am with you, you enjoy myself!" The song was first performed live on February 3, 1986. A short, a cappella version of "You Enjoy Myself" appeared on The White Tape, Phish's 1986 demo album. A longer, full-band version appeared on their album full-length debut, 1988's Junta.

Fans have dubbed the sections of the song "Pre-Nirvana," "Nirvana," "The Note," "The Second Note" and "The Charge." The song's mysterious single lyric, the couplet "Boy. Man. God. Shit / Wash Uffizi drive me to Firenze," has been such an intense topic of discussion that Phish internet message boards refer to it by the acronym "WATSIYEM" ("What are they saying in 'You Enjoy Myself'?")

When the song is performed live, one section features Anastasio and bassist Mike Gordon jumping on trampolines in tandem. Performances of the song regularly exceed 15 minutes, with some approaching 40 minutes.

== Legacy ==
The song was ranked No. 85 in the list of the 100 Greatest Guitar Songs of All Time of Rolling Stone, who considered the version on A Live One to be definitive. "You Enjoy Myself" is keyboardist Page McConnell's favorite Phish song.

== Appears on ==
- Phish (The White Tape) (1986)
- Junta (1989)
- Stash (1996)
- A Live One (1995)
- Live Phish Volume 7 (2002)
- Live Phish Volume 9 (2002)
- Live Phish Volume 11 (2002)
- Live Phish Volume 14 (2002)
- Live Phish Volume 15 (2002)
- Live Phish 04.05.98 (2005)
- New Year's Eve 1995 (2005)
- Colorado '88 (2006)
- Live Phish 11.14.95 (2007)
- Vegas 96 (2007)
- At the Roxy (2008)
- Chicago '94 (2012)
- St. Louis '93 (2017)
- The Spectrum '97 (2024)
- New Year’s Eve 1993 / Live At Worcester Centrum (2026)

== See also ==
- List of Phish songs
- Phish discography
