= Colorado '88 =

Live album by Phish
- Released: October 31, 2006 (US)
- Recorded: July 28–July 30 & August 4–5, 1988 at The Roma, Telluride, Colorado & August 3, 1988 at Fly Me to the Moon Saloon, Telluride, Colorado
- Genre: Rock
- Label: JEMP
- Producer: Phish

Phish chronology
Live in Brooklyn (2006)	Colorado '88 (2006)	Vegas 96 (2007)

Professional ratings
Review scores
Source	Rating
Rolling Stone	3/5 stars

Colorado '88 is a 3-CD live album by American rock band Phish, recorded over several nights in summer 1988. Despite having only traveled outside Vermont occasionally, in the New England college and club circuit, Phish embarked on a tour in the west. The band played seven shows in ten days to tiny crowds in small bars and restaurants in the ski towns of Telluride and Aspen. Colorado '88 collects, in chronological order, the best of those shows, providing a vivid glimpse into the days before the three and four-night stands at amphitheaters and arenas that would distinguish Phish in the years to come.

Mastered from the original analog cassette tapes, Colorado '88 contains recordings of songs that had not previously been widely traded or heard with such clarity. Several of the tracks in the collection had never before appeared on an official Phish release.

In 2018, new tapes of these shows were found, all of which were in full.

== History ==
When Phish arrived in Colorado, they made the most of the opportunity, managing to improvise bookings for seven shows over the course of ten days - six of which were in the small mountain town of Telluride.

According to Mike Gordon in The Phish Book: "My fiance Cilla Foster was responsible for our first tour. In 1988 she was waitressing in Telluride for a guy named Warren Stickney. I didn't know her very well at the time, but one day she called and said Stickney wanted us to come play in his bar. We'd never played further away from home than New Hampshire at the time, but Stickney promised to book a monthlong tour across the country. It took another six months to get him on the phone again, but I finally spoke with him about a week before we were supposed to hit the road. He said something like, 'I don't know if I can get you any other gigs, but you can play my place and I'll pay you a thousand bucks.' I couldn't get him on the phone after that, so the six of us - including Paul Languedoc and Tim Rogers, who was doing lights - decided to go for it anyway.

"We finished playing a Nectar's gig at 2am, took a vote, and decided to head west then and there. Our friends Ninja Custodian subbed for us the next night at Nectar's, and we took off across the country with turkey ham, cheese, and apple butter. It was the middle of summer, and we were traveling in a windowless truck with only a foam mattress on the floor. We didn't even stop at a rest area for forty hours, so the truck got pretty disgusting."

== Track listing ==
=== Disc one ===
1. "The Curtain With" (Anastasio, Daubert) - 17:34
2. "The Sloth" (Anastasio) - 3:08
3. "Icculus" (Anastasio, Marshall) - 4:48
4. "Colonel Forbin's Ascent" (Anastasio) - 5:43
5. "Fly Famous Mockingbird" (Anastasio) - 9:14
6. "I Didn't Know" (Wright) - 5:38
7. "Maiden Voyage" (Hancock) - 9:29
8. "Timber" (White) - 11:23
9. "Harpua" (Anastasio, Fishman) - 12:27

=== Disc two ===
1. "Fluffhead" (Anastasio, Pollak) - 14:54
2. "Run Like an Antelope" (Anastasio, Marshall, Pollak) - 10:58
3. "Sneakin' Sally Thru the Alley" (Toussaint) - 6:47
4. "Light Up or Leave Me Alone" (Capaldi) - 7:27
5. "The Lizards" (Anastasio) - 10:21
6. "I Know a Little" (Gaines) - 2:59
7. "The Man Who Stepped Into Yesterday" (Anastasio) - 3:18
8. "Avenu Malcanu" (Traditional) - 3:08
9. "The Man Who Stepped Into Yesterday" (Anastasio) - 1:35
10. "Flat Fee" (Anastasio) - 2:22
11. "McGrupp and the Watchful Hosemasters" (Anastasio, Marshall) - 9:32
12. "Alumni Blues" (Anastasio) - 4:32
13. "Letter To Jimmy Page" (Anastasio) - 1:00
14. "Alumni Blues" (Anastasio) - :44

=== Disc three ===
1. "Camel Walk" (Holdsworth) - 5:39
2. "Wilson" (Anastasio, Marshall, Woolf) - 5:47
3. "No Dogs Allowed" (Anastasio) - 13:50
4. "Mike's Song" (Gordon) - 4:55
5. "I Am Hydrogen" (Anastasio, Daubert, Marshall) - 2:06
6. "Weekapaug Groove" (Anastasio, Fishman, Gordon, McConnell) - 4:20
7. "You Enjoy Myself" (Anastasio) - 17:31
8. "Cities" (Byrne) - 4:44
9. "Dave's Energy Guide" (Abrahams, Anastasio) - 1:25
10. "Cities" (Byrne) - :41
11. "AC/DC Bag" (Anastasio) - 10:06
12. "Corinna" (Davis, Taj Mahal) - 4:33
13. "Thank You" - 3:37

=== Bonus tracks ===
==== LivePhish.com download ====
1. "Sanity" (Anastasio, Fishman, Gordon, McConnell, Pollak) - 7:41
2. "Dog Log" (Anastasio) - 4:30
3. "Big Black Furry Creature From Mars" (Gordon) - 3:52
4. "Slave to the Traffic Light" (Abrahams, Anastasio, Pollak) - 10:27
5. "Harry Hood" (Anastasio, Fishman, Gordon, Long, McConnell) - 13:39

==== LivePhish.com pre-order (MP3 only) ====
1. "Tela" (Anastasio) - 11:43
2. "Possum" (Holdsworth) - 6:17

== Personnel ==
Phish

- Trey Anastasio - lead vocals, guitars, drums
- Page McConnell - keyboards, vocals
- Mike Gordon - bass guitar, vocals
- Jon Fishman - drums, vocals
