= Live Phish Volume 14 =

Live Phish Vol. 14

Live album by Phish
- Released: October 29, 2002
- Recorded: October 31, 1995
- Length: 3:57:05
- Label: Elektra
- Producer: Phish

Live Phish Series chronology
Live Phish Volume 13 (2002)	Live Phish Volume 14 (2002)	Live Phish Volume 15 (2002)

Professional ratings
Review scores
Source	Rating
Allmusic	3/5 stars

Live Phish Vol. 14 is a live album by American rock group Phish, which was recorded live at the Rosemont Horizon (now the Allstate Arena) in Rosemont, Illinois, near Chicago, on Halloween night, 1995.

It marks the second Halloween show in which Phish dressed up in a "musical costume" by performing an album from another artist in its entirety. The band, along with a horn section, unveiled a complete performance of The Who's Quadrophenia, led by keyboardist Page McConnell, sandwiched between two sets of Phish's own music. During their performance of "Harpua" Trey Anastasio told the story of Jimmy listening to his favorite album, which happened to be "the very same album that Phish was playing as their Halloween album at Rosemont Horizon that night." At this point they broke into a brief segment of "Beat It" by Michael Jackson, which led to fans believing they were going to play Thriller. They also played a loop of "Wanna Be Startin' Somethin'" over the PA at the beginning of set two before the ocean sounds of "I Am the Sea" overtook it. At the end of the show, the band encored with "My Generation" and destroyed their instruments just like The Who had done thirty years earlier.

== Track listing ==
=== Disc one ===
Set one:

1. "Icculus" (Anastasio, Marshall) – 4:22
2. "The Divided Sky" (Anastasio) – 15:07
3. "Wilson" (Anastasio, Marshall, Woolf) – 4:41
4. "Ya Mar" (Ferguson) – 8:16
5. "Sparkle" (Anastasio, Marshall) – 3:45
6. "Free" (Anastasio, Marshall) – 9:39
7. "Guyute" (Anastasio, Marshall) – 10:38

=== Disc two ===
Set one, continued:

1. "Run Like an Antelope" (Anastasio, Marshall, Pollak) – 12:51
2. "Harpua" (Anastasio, Fishman) – 14:17

Set two:

3. "I Am the Sea" (Townshend) – 3:28
4. "The Real Me" (Townshend) – 3:22
5. "Quadrophenia" (Townshend) – 6:08
6. "Cut My Hair" (Townshend) – 3:49
7. "The Punk and the Godfather" (Townshend) – 4:54
8. "I'm One" (Townshend) – 3:12

=== Disc three ===
Set two, continued:

1. "The Dirty Jobs" (Townshend) – 5:45
2. "Helpless Dancer" (Townshend) – 2:20
3. "Is It in My Head" (Townshend) – 3:37
4. "I've Had Enough" (Townshend) – 5:47
5. "5:15" (Townshend) – 6:20
6. "Sea and Sand" (Townshend) – 3:30
7. "Drowned" (Townshend) – 4:58
8. "Bell Boy" (Townshend) – 4:32
9. "Doctor Jimmy" (Townshend) – 8:35
10. "The Rock" (Townshend) – 6:35
11. "Love, Reign O'er Me" (Townshend) – 6:37

=== Disc four ===
Set three:

1. "Audience Chess Move" – 2:28
2. "You Enjoy Myself" (Anastasio) – 40:33
3. "Jesus Just Left Chicago" (Beard, Gibbons, Hill) – 9:18
4. "A Day in the Life" (Lennon, McCartney) – 4:31
5. "Suzy Greenberg" (Anastasio, Pollak) – 8:30

Encore:

6. "My Generation" (Townshend) – 4:40

== Personnel ==
=== Phish ===
- Trey Anastasio – guitars, lead vocals, narration on "Harpua", acoustic guitar on "My Generation"
- Page McConnell – piano, organ, backing vocals, lead vocals on "Cut My Hair", "The Punk Meets the Godfather", "The Dirty Jobs", "Is It In My Head?", "I've Had Enough", "Sea and Sand", "Doctor Jimmy" and "Jesus Just Left Chicago", co-lead vocals on "A Day in the Life", upright bass on "My Generation"
- Mike Gordon – bass, backing vocals, narration on "Harpua", lead vocals on "Ya Mar" and "Drowned", banjo on "My Generation"
- Jon Fishman – drums, backing vocals, lead vocals on "Love, Reign O'er Me"

=== Horn section ===
- Dave Grippo – alto saxophone
- Carl Gerhard – trumpet
- Joey Somerville Jr. – trumpet
- Chris Peterman – tenor saxophone
- Mike Hewitt – baritone saxophone
- Don Glasgo – trombone, French horn

=== Additional personnel ===
- Leigh Fordham - co-lead vocals on "Bell Boy"
