= High Neighbors: Dub Tribute to Phish =

Studio album by Various Artists (Phish Tribute)
- Released: August 8, 2006
- Genre: Various
- Label: Vitamin Records
- Producer: Enrico Cacace

Various Artists (Phish Tribute) chronology
The String Quartet Tribute To Phish (2004)	High Neighbors: Dub Tribute to Phish (2006)

High Neighbors: Dub Tribute to Phish is a tribute album to the rock band Phish featuring instrumental reggae and dub versions of several Phish classics. With the exception of percussionist Mario Calandrelli, all of the music on the album is performed by project leader Martino Campobasso.

The album features all new arrangements conceived by Campobasso, with only hints of the songs' original themes.

== Track listing ==
1. "Bouncing Around the Room" - 4:10
2. "First Tube" - 4:47
3. "Maze" - 4:01
4. "Chalk Dust Torture" - 3:46
5. "Wolfman’s Brother" - 3:44
6. "Makisupa Policeman" - 4:26
7. "Mike’s Song" - 4:06
8. "Sample in a Jar" - 3:35
9. "Run Like an Antelope" - 3:55
10. "Stash" - 4:02
11. "The Wedge" - 3:46
12. "Tweezer" - 4:33

== Personnel ==
- Martino Campobasso: guitar, keyboards, sequencing
- Mario Calandrelli: percussion
