= Cavern (song) =

Single by Phish

from the album A Picture of Nectar
- Released: 1992
- Recorded: June–August 1991, White Crow Studios, Burlington, Vermont
- Genre: Rock, funk rock
- Length: 4:24
- Label: Elektra PRCD 8607-2
- Songwriter(s): Trey Anastasio, Scott Herman, Tom Marshall
- Producer(s): Phish, Kevin Halpin

Phish singles chronology
"Chalk Dust Torture" (1992)	"Cavern" (1992)	"Fast Enough for You" (1993)

"Cavern" is a 1992 song by the American band Phish. It is the third track from their 1992 album A Picture of Nectar and was also released as their second promotional single by Elektra Records. The song is a beat-driven funk rock song written by Phish guitarist and lead vocalist Trey Anastasio and lyricist Scott Herman and Tom Marshall.

“Cavern” has been a rock in Phish’s rotation since early 1990. While most fans have become accustomed to the song as a set-closer or encore, initially it was much more versatile, appearing just about everywhere in the setlist. It was only beginning in 1992 that the band began utilizing it in its current role. In fact, beginning in fall 1992, well over half of the performances of “Cavern” have come either at the close of a set or during an encore. And no wonder: the song’s straight-up rock feel and fist-pumping climax make it a fitting exclamation point on the end of an evening of more excursionary jamming.

== Track listing ==
1. "Cavern" (Trey Anastasio, Scott Herman, Tom Marshall) - 4:24

== Personnel ==
Phish

Trey Anastasio – guitars, vocals
Page McConnell – keyboards, vocals
Mike Gordon – bass guitar, vocals
Jon Fishman – drums, vocals

== Also appears on ==
- Hampton Comes Alive (1999)
- Live Phish Volume 2 (2001)
- Live Phish Volume 7 (2002)
- Live Phish Volume 10 (2002)
- Live Phish Volume 19 (2003)
- Live Phish 04.05.98 (2005)
- At the Roxy (2008)
- Coral Sky (DVD) (2010)
