= Fast Enough for You =

- Cover of promo single

Single by Phish

from the album Rift
- Released: 1993
- Recorded: September–October 1992, White Crow Studios, Burlington, Vermont and October–November 1992, The Castle, Nashville, Tennessee
- Genre: Rock, jazz fusion
- Length: 4:51
- Label: Elektra PRCD 8707-2
- Songwriters: Trey Anastasio, Tom Marshall
- Producer: Barry Beckett

Phish singles chronology
"Cavern" (1992)	"Fast Enough for You" (1993)	"The Wedge" (1993)

"Fast Enough for You" is a 1993 song by the American band Phish. It is the second track from their 1993 concept album Rift and was released as their third promotional single by Elektra Records. The song is a slow-tempo ballad written by Phish guitarist and lead vocalist Trey Anastasio and lyricist Tom Marshall. The studio recording features a pedal steel guitar performed by Gordon Stone.

In "Fast Enough for You," Tom Marshall (lyricist) supposes that we wouldn’t burden each other as we do with weighty expectations and needs unmet, and things would be a whole lot happier. But that’s not the way it is, and the lover to whom our narrator speaks is not content with the pace of the affair. He is thus a target for her scorn.

The song was performed by Phish the most during the year of and the year following its release. It has since become a scarcity among live shows and turns up about twice a year.

== Track listing ==
1. "Fast Enough for You" (Edit of LP Version) (Trey Anastasio, Tom Marshall) - 4:01

== Chart performance ==
"Fast Enough for You" peaked at No. 50 on the Radio & Records Album-oriented rock chart in 1993.

== Personnel ==
Musicians

Trey Anastasio – guitars, vocals
Page McConnell – keyboards, vocals
Mike Gordon – bass guitar, vocals
Jon Fishman – drums, vocals
Gordon Stone – pedal steel

== Also appears on ==
- Live Phish Volume 12 (2002)
- Live Phish Volume 18 (2003)
- At the Roxy (2008)
- The Gorge '98 (2022)
