= Live Phish Volume 15 =

Live Phish Vol. 15

Live album by Phish
- Released: October 29, 2002
- Recorded: October 31, 1996
- Genre: Rock
- Length: 219:07
- Label: Elektra
- Producer: Phish

Live Phish Series chronology
Live Phish Volume 14 (2002)	Live Phish Volume 15 (2002)	Live Phish Volume 16 (2002)

Professional ratings
Review scores
Source	Rating
AllMusic	4/5 stars

Live Phish Vol. 15 was recorded live at The Omni in Atlanta, Georgia, on Halloween night, 1996.

This show marks the third in a series of Halloween shows in which Phish dressed up in a "musical costume" by performing an album from another artist in its entirety. The band, along with a horn section and Santana percussionist Karl Perazzo, unveiled a complete performance of Talking Heads' Remain in Light sandwiched between two sets of Phish's own music. Unlike previous Halloween shows, where they kept their album choice a secret until the set began, they revealed the choice of Remain in Light in a Playbill distributed to fans upon arriving at the venue.

The performance is noted by the band as their favorite Halloween show. The band has subsequently included "Crosseyed and Painless" in their live show song rotation, beginning with a 20-minute version performed at their next concert on November 2, which also featured Perazzo and was later released as the live DVD Coral Sky.

== Track listing ==
=== Disc one ===
Set one:

1. "Sanity" (Anastasio, Fishman, Gordon, McConnell, Pollak) – 5:48
2. "Highway to Hell" (Scott, Young, Young) – 3:39
3. "Down with Disease" (Anastasio, Marshall) – 11:06
4. "You Enjoy Myself" (Anastasio) – 22:54
5. "Prince Caspian" (Anastasio, Marshall) – 7:07

=== Disc two ===
Set one, continued:

1. "Reba" (Anastasio) – 15:40
2. "Colonel Forbin's Ascent" (Anastasio) – 5:29
3. "Fly Famous Mockingbird" (Anastasio) – 10:07
4. "Character Zero" (Anastasio, Marshall) – 7:34
5. "The Star-Spangled Banner" (Key, Smith) – 1:33

=== Disc three ===
Set two: (Talking Heads' Remain in Light album performed)

1. "Born Under Punches (The Heat Goes On)" (Byrne, Eno, Frantz, Harrison, Weymouth) – 6:40
2. "Crosseyed and Painless" (Byrne, Eno, Frantz, Harrison, Weymouth) – 9:59
3. "The Great Curve" (Byrne, Eno, Frantz, Harrison, Weymouth) – 9:07
4. "Once in a Lifetime" (Byrne, Eno, Frantz, Harrison, Weymouth) – 5:08
5. "Houses in Motion" (Byrne, Eno, Frantz, Harrison, Weymouth) – 8:57
6. "Seen and Not Seen" (Byrne, Eno, Frantz, Harrison, Weymouth) – 4:30
7. "Listening Wind" (Byrne, Eno, Frantz, Harrison, Weymouth) – 8:08
8. "The Overload" (Byrne, Eno, Frantz, Harrison, Weymouth) – 10:56

=== Disc four ===
Set three:

1. "Brother" (Anastasio, Fishman, Gordon, McConnell) – 5:56
2. "2001" (Deodato) – 6:51
3. "Maze" (Anastasio, Marshall) – 12:38
4. "Simple" (Gordon) – 15:03
5. "Swept Away" (Anastasio, Marshall) – 1:09
6. "Steep" (Anastasio, Fishman, Gordon, Marshall, McConnell) – 1:56
7. "Jesus Just Left Chicago" (Beard, Gibbons, Hill) – 7:49
8. "Suzy Greenberg" (Anastasio, Pollak) – 8:00

Encore:

9. "Frankenstein" (Winter) – 5:23

== Personnel ==
Phish

- Trey Anastasio – guitars, lead vocals, bass guitar on "Seen and Not Seen", narration on "Fly Famous Mockingbird"
- Jon Fishman – drums, backing vocals, lead vocals on "Crosseyed and Painless" and "The Overload"
- Mike Gordon – bass guitar, backing vocals, lead vocals on "Seen and Not Seen"
- Page McConnell – piano, organ, backing vocals, lead vocals on "The Great Curve", "Houses in Motion", "Listening Wind" and "Jesus Just Left Chicago"

Remain in Light set

- Gary Gazaway – trumpet (also played on "Jesus Just Left Chicago," "Suzy Greenberg," and "Frankenstein")
- Dave Grippo – saxophone (also played on "Jesus Just Left Chicago," "Suzy Greenberg," and "Frankenstein")
- Karl Perazzo – percussion (also played throughout third set)

== Setlist from Phish.net ==
- Phish.net hosts a detailed setlist archive maintained by fans and supported by the Mockingbird Foundation.

Set 1

1. "Sanity"
2. "Highway to Hell"
3. "Down with Disease"
4. "You Enjoy Myself"
5. "Prince Caspian"
6. "Reba"
7. "Colonel Forbin's Ascent" → "Fly Famous Mockingbird"
8. "Character Zero"
9. "The Star Spangled Banner"

Set 2

1. "Born Under Punches (The Heat Goes On)" → "Crosseyed and Painless" → "The Great Curve"
2. "Once in a Lifetime" → "Houses in Motion" → "Seen and Not Seen" → "Listening Wind" → "The Overload"

Set 3

1. "Brother"
2. "2001" → "Maze"
3. "Simple" → "Swept Away" → "Steep"
4. "Jesus Just Left Chicago"
5. "Suzy Greenberg"

Encore

1. "Frankenstein"
