= Phish: Live in Brooklyn (video) =

- DVD cover
- Directed by: Eli Tishberg
- Starring: Phish
- Music by: Phish
- Distributed by: JEMP
- Release date: July 11, 2006
- Country: United States
- Language: English

Live in Brooklyn is the name of a concert DVD and CD released on July 11, 2006, by the rock band Phish. Performed on June 17, 2004, at the minor league baseball field KeySpan Park in Brooklyn, New York, it was the opening night of what was then intended as the band's final tour. The concert was originally recorded for a simulcast in movie theatres. The concert features the debuts of "A Song I Heard the Ocean Sing" and "Nothing", both of which recorded on their most recent album, "Undermind". Also, "Dinner and a Movie" and "The Curtain With" had not been played since their Las Vegas 2000 run shortly before their hiatus.

The following night, at the same venue, the band performed again, with a surprise appearance from rapper Jay-Z. The recording includes some songs from this concert, but not those featuring Jay-Z.

This was the second release from Phish's record label, JEMP Records.

== Track listing ==
=== Disc one ===
1. "A Song I Heard the Ocean Sing" - 6:35
2. "Dinner and a Movie" - 3:52
3. "The Curtain With" - 13:43
4. "Sample in a Jar" - 4:58
5. "The Moma Dance" - 15:00
6. "Free" - 10:27
7. "Nothing" - 5:34
8. "Maze" - 10:21
9. "Frankenstein" - 5:00

=== Disc two ===
1. "46 Days" - 17:23
2. "Possum" - 8:16
3. "The Oh Kee Pa Ceremony" - 1:46
4. "Suzy Greenberg" - 18:24
5. "Axilla I" - 3:23
6. "2001" - 9:00
7. "Birds of a Feather" - 7:04
8. "Kung" - 3:00
9. "Mike's Song" - 9:04
10. "I Am Hydrogen" - 2:41
11. "Weekapaug Groove" - 12:43
12. "Divided Sky" - 15:35

=== Bonus DVD material ===
1. "Excerpts from 6/17/04 Soundcheck"
2. "Taste" (6/18/04, Keyspan Park, Brooklyn, NY)
3. "Bug" (6/18/04, Keyspan Park, Brooklyn, NY)
4. "Tweezer Reprise" (6/18/04, Keyspan Park, Brooklyn, NY)

== Personnel ==
Phish

- Trey Anastasio - lead vocals, guitars
- Page McConnell - keyboards, vocals
- Mike Gordon - bass, vocals, lead vocals on "Mike's Song"
- Jon Fishman - drums, percussion, vocals, co-lead vocals on "The Moma Dance"
