= Alpine Valley Music Theatre =

Concert venue in East Troy, Wisconsin

- Alpine Valley
- Interactive map of Alpine Valley Music Theatre
- Location: County Highway D East Troy, Wisconsin
- Coordinates: 42°44′16″N 88°26′01″W
- Owner: Consolidated-Tomoka Land Company
- Operator: Live Nation
- Seating type: Reserved, Lawn
- Capacity: 30,000
- Type: Outdoor amphitheater

Construction
- Opened: 1977

Website
- Venue Info

Alpine Valley Music Theatre is a 30,000-capacity amphitheater located on County Highway D in East Troy, Wisconsin. The seasonal venue was built in 1977 and it features a wooden roof, covering the 7,500-seat pavilion and a sprawling lawn. It was the largest amphitheater in the United States until 1993, when the Glen Helen Pavilion (now known as the Glen Helen Amphitheater) was built in California.

The amphitheater was purchased by Nederlander Concerts in 1993, and later acquired by SFX (now Live Nation) in 1999. In 2019 the venue was sold to Consolidated-Tomoka Land Company for $7.5M with Live Nation retaining its lease.

== Notable performances ==
The amphitheater has played host to many concerts and music festivals, including Family Values Tour, Furthur Festival, H.O.R.D.E. Festival, Lollapalooza, Monsters of Rock Festival, Ozzfest, PJ20 Festival, Projekt Revolution, Tibetan Freedom Concert, World Series of Rock Festival, and Farm Aid 2019.

Boz Scaggs headlined the venue's inaugural event on June 30, 1977. Jimmy Buffett & The Coral Reefer Band played during its inaugural summer of 1977 and every subsequent year since 1995, with the exception of 2005, 2017, and 2018. Aerosmith also performed during the venue's inaugural season in 1977, and has appeared there fourteen times.

The Grateful Dead played at Alpine Valley 20 times from 1980 through 1989. Their album, Dick's Picks Volume 32, was recorded here in 1982 and their concert performance video, Downhill From Here, documents concerts from 1989.

Journey recorded a live album here on September 5, 1981 called "Rollin' On", and had a live broadcast to WLS-FM in Chicago, and KCRW-FM in Los Angeles, California.

Mötley Crüe filmed their music video for "Same Ol' Situation" at a concert here on July 7, 1990.

On August 26, 1990, Stevie Ray Vaughan & Double Trouble played at the amphitheater along with other blues greats Robert Cray, Buddy Guy, Eric Clapton and his brother Jimmie Vaughan. After the concert, Vaughan left the area on a helicopter to return to Chicago and he and four others were killed, when the helicopter crashed into a ski hill, within the Alpine Valley resort.

The Rolling Stones performed 3 nights at Alpine Valley (Sept. 8, 9 & 11, 1989). These were the bands' first performances in Wisconsin since 1975 at Milwaukee County Stadium. The band was interviewed by ABC's 20/20 during their stay in East Troy, WI.

Phish has played Alpine Valley 26 times; their live album, entitled, Live Phish Volume 5, was recorded here on July 8, 2000. In 2010 Phish released a two DVD two CD set of their August 14 performance at the venue that year. Phish has performed two of their longest post-2009 hiatus jams at the venue, playing a version of the song "Ruby Waves" lasting 38 minutes on 07/14/2019 and a version of "Simple" eclipsing 40 minutes on 07/27/2024.

The Ozzfest tour came here almost every year and the CD, Ozzfest 2001: The Second Millennium, is culled from performances here.

The Dave Matthews Band has played a two night stand at Alpine Valley numerous times since 1999. Their live releases, Live Trax Vol. 8 was recorded on August 7, 2004, Live Trax Vol. 15 was recorded on August 9, 2008, and Live Trax Vol. 36 was recorded on July 26, 2015. In 2024, the band's second night of their two night stand was evacuated and postponed due to a severe thunderstorm and a nearby tornado. The band returned the following week to play the show.

Korn recorded the music video for their song "Politics", during the Alpine Valley stop of the Family Values Tour on August 26, 2006.

Rage Against the Machine played a concert at Alpine Valley, with Queens of the Stone Age, for their only announced solo show, on August 24, 2007. Rage Against the Machine would later use the venue to kick off their twice-delayed Public Service Announcement Tour on July 9, 2022 - their first performance in almost 11 years.

The Black Crowes filmed their "Hard to Handle" music video here.

Pearl Jam, Dave Matthews Band, Rush and Phish have all regarded Alpine Valley as one of their favorite venues to play. Former Phish road manager Brad Sands regards Alpine Valley as his favorite venue to see the band. Pearl Jam also played their only scheduled U.S. dates at the venue in 2011, as part of their 20th anniversary celebrations.

== See also ==
- List of contemporary amphitheatres
