= A Picture of Nectar =

Studio album by Phish
- Released: February 18, 1992
- Recorded: June–August 1991
- Studios: White Crow Studios, Burlington, VT
- Genres: Psychedelia; jazz; bluegrass; rock
- Length: 60:25
- Label: Elektra
- Producers: Phish; Kevin Halpin

Phish chronology
Lawn Boy (1990)	A Picture of Nectar (1992)	Rift (1993)

Singles from A Picture of Nectar
- 1. "Chalk Dust Torture" Released: 1992; 2. "Cavern" Released: 1992

A Picture of Nectar is the third studio album by the American rock band Phish. The album was released on February 18, 1992, by Elektra Records and was the band's debut release for a major record label.

The album is dedicated to Nector Rorris, the proprietor of Nectar's in Burlington, Vermont, where Phish played their first bar gig followed by a series of monthly three-night stands, saying that the experience "taught us how to play".

There are two versions of the album's cover. The first printings of the CD were issued in longbox format, and the title of the album was not printed on the CD insert itself. Later printings came in shrink-wrap format and had the band's name and album title printed directly on the insert.

The songs on A Picture of Nectar explore a variety of musical genres, including jazz, country, calypso, rock and roll and neo-psychedelia. Tracks 2, 8, 9, and 14 are instrumentals. The song "Manteca" is a cover of the song by jazz trumpeter Dizzy Gillespie; in Phish's short version, the melody line is sung as a goofy nonsense phrase. "Poor Heart" is written in a hybrid of bluegrass and "hot licks" country styles. The Latin jazz instrumental "The Landlady" is performed in concert as both a segment of the longer piece "Punch You in the Eye" and as a separate song.

All songs on the album have been performed live by the band, though the instrumental tracks have become relative rarities after the mid-1990s. The short instrumental, "Faht", written by drummer Jon Fishman, has only been performed live twelve times, the last in 1995.

The album was certified gold by the RIAA on November 15, 2001.

After its vinyl reissue in 2014, A Picture of Nectar charted on the Billboard 200 for the first time (22 years after its release), peaking at number 110.

== Critical reception ==
Professional ratings
Review scores
Source	Rating
Allmusic	4.5/5 stars

Allmusic staff writer Jim Smith gave the album four and a half stars out of five, noting the variety of musical genres explored on the album and calling it "a surprisingly tight record for a band that built its reputation on endless concert jams".

In an April 2, 1992, review, Billboard magazine raved that A Picture of Nectar "...should be required on all college listening lists. The songs are all over the place from whacked-out rock to bluegrass to jazz. The constant is the high quality of musicianship and spirit that runs from track to track."

== Track listing ==
A Picture of Nectar
No.	Title	Writer(s)	Lead vocals	Length
1.	"Llama"	Trey Anastasio	Anastasio	3:32
2.	"Eliza"	Anastasio	instrumental	1:32
3.	"Cavern"	Anastasio; Tom Marshall; Scott Herman	Anastasio	4:24
4.	"Poor Heart"	Mike Gordon	Gordon	2:45
5.	"Stash"	Anastasio; Marshall	Anastasio	7:11
6.	"Manteca"	Gil Fuller; Dizzy Gillespie; Chano Pozo	Anastasio; Jon Fishman; Gordon; Page McConnell	0:29
7.	"Guelah Papyrus"	Anastasio; Marshall	Anastasio	5:22
8.	"Magilla"	McConnell	instrumental	2:46
9.	"The Landlady"	Anastasio	instrumental	2:56
10.	"Glide"	Anastasio; Fishman; Gordon; McConnell; Marshall	Anastasio; Gordon; McConnell	4:13
11.	"Tweezer"	Anastasio; Fishman; Gordon; McConnell	Anastasio; Fishman; Gordon; McConnell	8:42
12.	"The Mango Song"	Anastasio	Anastasio	6:24
13.	"Chalk Dust Torture"	Anastasio; Marshall	Anastasio	4:36
14.	"Faht"	Fishman	instrumental	2:21
15.	"Catapult"	Gordon	Gordon	0:32
16.	"Tweezer Reprise"	Anastasio; Fishman; Gordon; McConnell	Anastasio; Fishman; Gordon; McConnell	2:40
Total length:				60:25

== Personnel ==
Phish

- Trey Anastasio – guitar, lead vocals
- Page McConnell – keyboard, organ, backing vocals
- Mike Gordon – bass guitar, vocals, lead vocals on "Poor Heart" and "Catapult"
- Jon Fishman – drums, backing vocals

Additional

- Gordon Stone – pedal steel, banjo
- Michael Mills – art direction
- Tom Walters – assistant engineer
- Jon Altschiller – engineer
- Bob Ludwig – mastering
- B.C. Kagan – photography
- Joe Witkop – photography
- Kevin Halpin – producer, engineer

== In popular culture ==
The song "Llama" is included in the music video game Rock Band 3, where it is the second song in the main-game series (not including DLC) to have full Impossible rating for all band members (Painkiller from Rock Band 2 being the first). However, it is the first to have a full Impossible rating with keyboard included. "Stash" and "Tweezer" were also released as downloadable content for Rock Band 3 in 2011.

"Tweezer Reprise" was used in a Michael Phelps montage following his 19th Olympic medal in 2012. It was also used by the Atlanta Falcons in their introduction video at Super Bowl 51.

"Catapult" features a sample from "I Remember Now" by Queensrÿche off of the album Operation: Mindcrime.

== Charts ==
Chart (1992)	Peak position
US Top Heatseekers (Billboard)	30
