= The Clifford Ball (video) =

- Directed by: Martin Pitts
- Starring: Phish
- Music by: Phish
- Distributed by: JEMP
- Release date: March 3, 2009
- Running time: 600 minutes

The Clifford Ball is a seven-DVD box set released on March 3, 2009 by the rock band Phish. It was performed on August 16 and August 17, 1996 at Plattsburgh Air Force Base in Plattsburgh, NY, chronicling the first of eleven Phish festivals, as of 2025. The collection received a nomination for the Grammy Award for Best Boxed or Special Limited Edition Package in 2009.

Additional footage in this set includes documentaries, the soundcheck from August 15, and footage of the early morning performance of "The Flatbed Jam".

Phish issued the entirety of The Clifford Ball on a 12 LP box set on March 4, 2022. The Flatbad Jam was also made available on a separate LP. The same day as the box set's release, the official audio recordings of the festival were also made available for digital purchase and streaming on the band's LivePhish website.

The event was named after aviator Clifford Ball. The band reportedly learned of Ball from a plaque in a Pittsburgh airport which described him as a "Beacon of light in the world of flight". Phish had previously used the name "The Clifford Ball" as the recording location of the tracks that appeared on their 1995 live album A Live One, as they were unable to secure the recording rights from every venue on the album at the time of its release.

== Track listing ==
=== Disc one (August 16, 1996 – Set one) ===
1. "Chalk Dust Torture" (Anastasio, Marshall) – 7:05
2. "Bathtub Gin" (Anastasio, Goodman) – 10:30
3. "Ya Mar" (Ferguson) – 8:51
4. "AC/DC Bag" (Anastasio) – 9:11
5. "Esther" (Anastasio) – 9:07
6. "The Divided Sky" (Anastasio) – 16:35
7. "Halley's Comet" (Wright) – 7:01
8. "David Bowie" (Anastasio) – 14:52

=== Disc two (August 16, 1996 – Set two) ===
1. "Split Open and Melt" (Anastasio) – 13:46
2. "Sparkle" (Anastasio, Marshall) – 3:48
3. "Free" (Anastasio, Marshall) – 8:48
4. "The Squirming Coil" (Anastasio, Marshall) – 10:30
5. "Waste" (Anastasio, Marshall) – 4:59
6. "Talk" (Anastasio, Marshall) – 3:41
7. "Train Song" (Gordon, Linitz) – 3:14
8. "Strange Design" (Anastasio, Marshall) – 3:47
9. "Hello My Baby" (Emerson, Howard, Singer) – 1:48
10. "Mike's Song" (Gordon) – 16:00
11. "Simple" (Gordon) – 6:03
12. "Contact" (Gordon) – 6:09
13. "Weekapaug Groove" (Anastasio, Fishman, Gordon, McConnell) – 10:02

=== Disc three (August 16, 1996 – Set three) ===
1. "Makisupa Policeman" (Anastasio, Marshall) – 8:17
2. "2001" (Deodato) – 6:13
3. "Down with Disease" (Anastasio, Marshall) – 15:34
4. "NICU" (Anastasio, Marshall) – 5:17
5. "Life on Mars?" (Bowie) – 3:23
6. "Harry Hood" (Anastasio, Fishman, Gordon, Long, McConnell) – 19:58
7. "Amazing Grace" (Traditional) – 2:34

=== Disc four (August 17, 1996 – Set one) ===
1. "The Old Home Place" (Jayne, Webb) – 3:37
2. "Punch You in the Eye" (Anastasio) – 8:11
3. "Reba" (Anastasio) – 16:19
4. "Cars Trucks Buses" (McConnell) – 3:41
5. "The Lizards" (Anastasio) – 10:35
6. "Sample in a Jar" (Anastasio, Marshall) – 4:59
7. "Taste" (Anastasio, Fishman, Gordon, Marshall, McConnell) – 7:02
8. "Fee" (Anastasio) – 5:52
9. "Maze" (Anastasio, Marshall) – 12:50
10. "Suzy Greenberg" (Pollak) – 7:06

=== Disc five (August 17, 1996 – Set two) ===
1. "The Curtain" (Anastasio, Daubert) – 7:39
2. "Runaway Jim" (Abrahams, Anastasio) – 12:26
3. "It's Ice" (Anastasio, Marshall) – 9:03
4. "Brother" (Anastasio, Fishman, Gordon, McConnell) – 6:19
5. "Fluffhead" (Anastasio, Pollak) – 14:42
6. "Run Like an Antelope" (Anastasio, Pollak) – 10:09
7. "Golgi Apparatus" (Anastasio, Marshall, Szuter, Woolf) – 4:44
8. "Slave to the Traffic Light" (Abrahams, Anastasio, Pollak) – 13:03

=== Disc six (August 17, 1996 – Set three) ===
1. "Wilson" – (Anastasio, Marshall, Woolf) – 6:14
2. "Frankenstein" (Winter) – 4:49
3. "Scent of a Mule" (Gordon) – 15:22
4. "Tweezer" (Anastasio, Fishman, Gordon, McConnell) – 11:56
5. "A Day in the Life" (Lennon, McCartney) – 5:35
6. "Possum" (Holdsworth) – 13:23
7. "Tweezer Reprise" (Anastasio, Fishman, Gordon, McConnell) – 4:46
8. "Harpua" (Anastasio, Fishman) – 8:53

=== Disc seven ===
1. "The Clifford Ball: A Beacon of Light"
2. "The Flatbed Jam" (Anastasio, Fishman, Gordon, McConnell) – 39:22
3. "Soundcheck" (Anastasio, Fishman, Gordon, McConnell) – 52:56
4. "An Interview with Jim Pollock"
5. "Chris Kuroda Split-Screen"
6. "Phish: On Jamming"
7. "Phish: The LG"

== Album release ==
The Clifford Ball

Live album by Phish
- Released: March 4, 2022
- Recorded: August 16–17, 1996
- Venue: Plattsburgh Air Force Base (Plattsburgh, New York)
- Label: JEMP
- Producer: Phish

Phish chronology
LP on LP 02 (2021)	The Clifford Ball (2022)	LP on LP 03 (2022)

The Clifford Ball was later released in album form on LP and streaming on March 4, 2022.

=== Track listing ===
August 16, 1996 – Set one:

Side A

1. "Chalk Dust Torture" (Anastasio, Marshall) – 7:05
2. "Bathtub Gin" (Anastasio, Goodman) – 10:30

Side B

1. "Ya Mar" (Ferguson) – 8:51
2. "AC/DC Bag" (Anastasio) – 9:11

Side C

1. "Esther" (Anastasio) – 9:07
2. "The Divided Sky" (Anastasio) – 16:35

Side D

1. "Halley's Comet" (Wright) – 7:01
2. "David Bowie" (Anastasio) – 14:52

August 16, 1996 – Set two:

Side E

1. "Split Open and Melt" (Anastasio) – 13:46

Side F

1. "Sparkle" (Anastasio, Marshall) – 3:48
2. "Free" (Anastasio, Marshall) – 8:48
3. "The Squirming Coil" (Anastasio, Marshall) – 10:30

Side G

1. "Waste" (Anastasio, Marshall) – 4:59
2. "Talk" (Anastasio, Marshall) – 3:41
3. "Train Song" (Gordon, Linitz) – 3:14
4. "Strange Design" (Anastasio, Marshall) – 3:47
5. "Hello My Baby" (Emerson, Howard, Singer) – 1:48

Side H

1. "Mike's Song" (Gordon) – 16:00
2. "Simple" (Gordon) – 6:03

Side I

1. "Contact" (Gordon) – 6:09
2. "Weekapaug Groove" (Anastasio, Fishman, Gordon, McConnell) – 10:02

August 16, 1996 – Set three:

Side J

1. "Makisupa Policeman" (Anastasio, Marshall) – 8:17
2. "2001" (Deodato) – 6:13

Side K

1. "Down with Disease" (Anastasio, Marshall) – 15:34
2. "NICU" (Anastasio, Marshall) – 5:17

Side L

1. "Life on Mars?" (Bowie) – 3:23
2. "Harry Hood" (Anastasio, Fishman, Gordon, Long, McConnell) – 19:58
3. "Amazing Grace" (Traditional) – 2:34

August 17, 1996 – Set one:

Side M

1. "The Old Home Place" (Jayne, Webb) – 3:37
2. "Punch You in the Eye" (Anastasio) – 8:11

Side N

1. "Reba" (Anastasio) – 16:19
2. "Cars Trucks Buses" (McConnell) – 3:41

Side O

1. "The Lizards" (Anastasio) – 10:35
2. "Sample in a Jar" (Anastasio, Marshall) – 4:59
3. "Taste" (Anastasio, Fishman, Gordon, Marshall, McConnell) – 7:02

Side P

1. "Fee" (Anastasio) – 5:52
2. "Maze" (Anastasio, Marshall) – 12:50
3. "Suzy Greenberg" (Pollak) – 7:06

August 17, 1996 – Set two:

Side Q

1. "The Curtain" (Anastasio, Daubert) – 7:39
2. "Runaway Jim" (Abrahams, Anastasio) – 12:26

Side R

1. "It's Ice" (Anastasio, Marshall) – 9:03
2. "Brother" (Anastasio, Fishman, Gordon, McConnell) – 6:19

Side S

1. "Fluffhead" (Anastasio, Pollak) – 14:42
2. "Run Like an Antelope" (Anastasio, Pollak) – 10:09

Side T

1. "Golgi Apparatus" (Anastasio, Marshall, Szuter, Woolf) – 4:44
2. "Slave to the Traffic Light" (Abrahams, Anastasio, Pollak) – 13:03

August 17, 1996 – Set three:

Side U

1. "Wilson" – (Anastasio, Marshall, Woolf) – 6:14
2. "Frankenstein" (Winter) – 4:49

Side V

1. "Scent of a Mule" (Gordon) – 15:22

Side W

1. "Tweezer" (Anastasio, Fishman, Gordon, McConnell) – 11:56
2. "A Day in the Life" (Lennon, McCartney) – 5:35

Side X

1. "Possum" (Holdsworth) – 13:23
2. "Tweezer Reprise" (Anastasio, Fishman, Gordon, McConnell) – 4:46
3. "Harpua" (Anastasio, Fishman) – 8:53

== Personnel ==
Phish

- Trey Anastasio – guitars, lead vocals, acapella vocals on "Hello My Baby" and "Amazing Grace", narration on "Harpua"
- Page McConnell – keyboards, backing vocals, lead vocals on "Strange Design", "Life on Mars?", "It's Ice" and "A Day in the Life", acapella vocals on "Hello My Baby" and "Amazing Grace"
- Mike Gordon – bass, backing vocals, lead vocals on "Ya Mar", "Train Song", "Mike's Song", "Contact", "The Old Home Place" and "Scent of a Mule", acapella vocals on "Hello My Baby" and "Amazing Grace"
- Jon Fishman – drums, backing vocals, acapella vocals on "Hello My Baby" and "Amazing Grace"

Special guests

Ben Cohen and Jerry Greenfield of Ben & Jerry's – vocals on "Brother"

Video Director

Martin Pitts
