= Live Phish Volume 10 =

Live Phish Vol. 10

Live album by Phish
- Released: April 16, 2002
- Recorded: June 22, 1994
- Genre: Rock
- Length: 2:25:30; 22:26 (Filler)
- Label: Elektra
- Producer: Phish

Live Phish Series chronology
Live Phish Volume 9 (2002)	Live Phish Volume 10 (2002)	Live Phish Volume 11 (2002)

Professional ratings
Review scores
Source	Rating
Allmusic	3/5 stars

Live Phish Vol. 10 was recorded live at the Veterans Memorial Auditorium in Columbus, Ohio on June 22, 1994. Some Phish hobbyists advance that the concert ranks among the five best the band has ever played, although the weight of reliable authority holds otherwise.

It features the band on their 1994 summer tour. The group plays an experimental version of "Mike's Song," interpolating an early version of the Mike Gordon staple "Simple" and a jam based on the bass line and melody of The Allman Brothers Band's "Midnight Rider," as well as a version of the rarely-played "Icculus."

Bonus tracks include two songs from the Murat Theater in Indianapolis, Indiana on June 24, 1994.

Before the second set begins with "2001", Trey Anastasio informs the audience of the current score of Game 7 of the 1994 NBA Finals ("First quarter, Houston by 5"). The game is also mentioned during the Icculus narration ("Even if you're playing in the NBA finals, and you're winning by 5 points, [...] you'd damn well better read the book!"), and once more at the very end of the show ("After the third quarter: the Knicks 60, Houston 63!"). Apparently, this was in reference to a particularly tall (6'10"), and stoic fan in a Rockets jersey in the guitarist’s sightline who had been jotting notes down throughout the show.

== Track listing ==
=== Disc one ===
Set one:

1. "Llama" (Anastasio) - 4:33
2. "Guelah Papyrus" (Anastasio, Marshall) - 5:44
3. "Rift" (Anastasio, Marshall) - 6:04
4. "Gumbo" (Anastasio, Fishman) - 4:31
5. "Maze" (Anastasio, Marshall) - 10:22
6. "If I Could" (Anastasio) - 5:38
7. "Scent of a Mule" (Gordon) - 6:58
8. "Stash" (Anastasio, Marshall) - 10:58
9. "Golgi Apparatus" (Anastasio, Marshall, Szuter, Woolf) - 4:46

=== Disc two ===
Set two:

1. "2001" (Richard Strauss, arr. Deodato) - 4:45
2. "Mike's Song" (Gordon) - 6:20
3. "Simple" (Gordon) - 3:00
4. "Catapult" (Gordon) - 2:09
5. "Simple" (Gordon) - 3:53
6. "Icculus" (Anastasio, Marshall) - 3:41
7. "Simple" (Gordon) - 1:52
8. "Mike's Song" (Gordon) - 1:01
9. "I Am Hydrogen" (Anastasio, Daubert, Marshall) - 3:08
10. "Weekapaug Groove" (Anastasio, Fishman, Gordon, McConnell) - 3:35
11. "The Man Who Stepped Into Yesterday" (Anastasio) - 2:35
12. "Avenu Malkenu" (Traditional) - 3:08
13. "The Man Who Stepped Into Yesterday" (Anastasio) - 2:48
14. "Fluffhead" (Anastasio, Pollak) - 14:36
15. "My Sweet One" (Fishman) - 3:59

=== Disc three ===
Set two, continued:

1. "Big Ball Jam" (Anastasio, Fishman, Gordon, McConnell) - 2:35
2. "Jesus Just Left Chicago" (Beard, Gibbons, Hill) - 10:20
3. "Sample in a Jar" (Anastasio, Marshall) - 6:03

Encore:

4. "Carolina" (Traditional) - 1:40
5. "Cavern" (Anastasio, Herman, Marshall) - 4:47

Filler (June 24, 1994, Murat Theater, Indianapolis, Indiana):

6. "Demand" (Anastasio, Marshall) - 2:29
7. "Run Like an Antelope" (Anastasio, Marshall, Pollak) - 19:57

== Personnel ==
- Trey Anastasio - guitars, lead vocals, co-lead vocals on "Rift", acapella vocals on "Carolina"
- Page McConnell - piano, organ, backing vocals, co-lead vocals on "Rift", lead vocals on "Jesus Just Left Chicago" acapella vocals on "Carolina"
- Mike Gordon - bass, backing vocals, lead vocals on "Scent of a Mule", "Mike's Song" and "Catapult", acapella vocals on "Carolina"
- Jon Fishman - drums, backing vocals, acapella vocals on "Carolina"
