= Niagara Falls (Phish album) =

Live album by Phish
- Released: November 12, 2013
- Recorded: December 7, 1995
- Genre: Rock
- Length: 172:58
- Label: JEMP
- Producer: Phish

Phish chronology
Ventura (2013)	Niagara Falls (2013)	Fuego (2014)

Niagara Falls is a three-CD live album by the rock band Phish. It contains the complete concert recorded on December 7, 1995, at the Niagara Falls Convention Center in Niagara Falls, New York. It was released by JEMP Records on November 12, 2013.

== Critical reception ==
Professional ratings
Review scores
Source	Rating
Allmusic	4/5 stars

On AllMusic, Thom Jurek said, "Given Phish's musical renaissance after their reunion in 2008, revisiting the band's past is often useful for the purpose of hearing just what made them such a dominant force on the early jam band scene in the first place. This date, recorded at the Niagara Falls Convention Center in December of 1995, is a prime example.... The sound captured is simply pristine; the show is top flight.... It's not just Phish's tight command of the material that's so remarkable, but the improvisational interplay that takes place inside an intricate, often knotty set of musical parameters. As evidenced by Niagara Falls, playing and performing like this set the band apart in the early years — before they were given to excess bullshitting at the turn of the century. There isn't any of that here; it's all kinetic, and hot, top to bottom."

On All About Jazz, Doug Collette wrote, "When Phish played the Niagara Falls Convention Center on December 7th 1995, it'd be fair to say the band was hitting its stride with its art and its audience. Having played together for a dozen years at this point and cultivated a loyal and increasingly large coterie of followers, arguably as idiosyncratic as the Vermont-based group itself, the quirks that endeared Phish to their original followers — like the barbershop a capella chestnut "Hello My Baby" — were morphing into more broad eccentricities (the second of their ongoing giant chess matches continued here to be completed at year's end) that were proving accessible to a larger fan base."

On Live For Live Music, David Melamed said, "From a band whose storied career spans three full decades, Niagara Falls captures Phish in their prime, at a point where the band was gaining traction… selling out large arenas, expanding and refining a diverse repertoire, and building a strong relationship with their consistently-growing fan base.... Niagara Falls captures the musical essence of 1995, 1.0-era Phish. From the experimental space jams, the double a cappella set closers, and the pure bliss of the band's original music, this is one joyous slice of fabled Phish-tory."

On AltDaily, David Paul Kleinman wrote, "Phish has always been an act extempore, which is something that separates them out from virtually every other act hitting the large venues they do. It's difficult to find an arena act that has even one second that isn't prescripted. It's difficult to find an arena band that isn't playing the exact same songs in the exact same order every night: "Thank you, Cleveland... uh, I mean, Baltimore!" Phish is the very rare sort of act that performs without a net, and these two sets from a chilly night in upstate New York illustrate the band's widening range of risky moves. It's one thing to experiment with one kind of music per night. It is quite another thing to experiment with several kinds per night."

== Track listing ==
Disc one

First set:

1. "The Old Home Place" (Mitchell F. Jayne, Dean Webb) – 3:52
2. "The Curtain" (Trey Anastasio, Marc Daubert) – 6:07 →
3. "AC/DC Bag" (Anastasio) – 9:17 →
4. "Demand" (Anastasio, Tom Marshall) – 1:55 →
5. "Rift" (Anastasio, Marshall) – 5:42
6. "Slave to the Traffic Light" (Anastasio, Steve Pollak, Dave Abrahams) – 12:50
7. "Guyute" (Anastasio, Marshall) – 10:33
8. "Bouncing Around the Room" (Anastasio, Marshall) – 3:37 →
9. "Possum" (Jeff Holdsworth) – 14:20
10. "Hello My Baby" (Ida Emerson, Joseph E. Howard) – 1:52

Disc two

Second set:

1. "Audience Chess Move" (Anastasio, Fishman, Gordon, McConnell) – 1:10
2. "Split Open and Melt" (Anastasio) – 17:15
3. "Strange Design" (Anastasio, Marshall) – 3:00 →
4. "Taste" (Anastasio, Jon Fishman, Mike Gordon, Page McConnell, Marshall) – 7:37 →
5. "Reba" (Anastasio) – 14:40
6. "Julius" (Anastasio, Marshall) – 6:54

Disc three

Second set, continued:

1. "Sleeping Monkey" (Anastasio, Marshall) – 5:14 →
2. "Sparkle" (Anastasio, Marshall) – 3:29 →
3. "Mike's Song" (Gordon) – 17:24 →
4. "Weekapaug Groove" (Anastasio, Fishman, Gordon, McConnell) – 13:57
5. "Amazing Grace" (traditional) – 2:56

Encore:

6. "Uncle Pen" (Bill Monroe) – 4:52

Soundcheck:

7. "Poor Heart" (Gordon) – 4:19

== Personnel ==
Phish

- Trey Anastasio – guitar, lead vocals (on all tracks except where noted), co-lead vocals on "Rift", acapella vocals on "Hello My Baby" and "Amazing Grace"
- Jon Fishman – drums, backing vocals, acapella vocals on "Hello My Baby" and "Amazing Grace"
- Mike Gordon – bass, backing vocals, lead vocals on "The Old Home Place", "Possum", "Mike's Song", "Uncle Pen" and "Poor Heart", acapella vocals on "Hello My Baby" and "Amazing Grace"
- Page McConnell – keyboards, backing vocals, co-lead vocals on "Rift", lead vocals on "Strange Design", acapella vocals on "Hello My Baby" and "Amazing Grace"

Production

- Produced by Phish
- Recording: Paul Languedoc
- Post-production: Kevin Shapiro
- Technical assistance: Ben Collette
- Illustration: Dan Black
- Art direction: Julia Mordaunt
