= Live Phish Volume 12 =

Live Phish Vol. 12

Live album by Phish
- Released: April 16, 2002
- Recorded: August 13, 1996
- Genre: Rock
- Length: 3:01:36; 21:56 (Filler)
- Label: Elektra
- Producer: Phish

Live Phish Series chronology
Live Phish Volume 11 (2002)	Live Phish Volume 12 (2002)	Live Phish Volume 13 (2002)

Professional ratings
Review scores
Source	Rating
Allmusic	3/5 stars

Live Phish Vol. 12 is a live album by American rock band Phish, which was recorded live at the Deer Creek Music Center in Noblesville, Indiana, on August 13, 1996.

The album marked the first time that the songs "Strange Design" and "Sleeping Monkey" had appeared on a commercially released Phish album.

Highlights include a mini-acoustic set of songs from the soon-to-be released, critically acclaimed Billy Breathes album, as well as a 22-minute version of the Phish classic "Mike's Song." Also of note is an exceptional version of the Rift classic "Fast Enough for You," said by many fans to be one of the best versions ever of the reflective ballad.

The show also includes keyboardist Page McConnell performing a solo version of The Wizard of Oz classic "Somewhere over the Rainbow" on a theremin.

Bonus tracks include two songs from the night before at the same venue.

== Track listing ==
=== Disc one ===
Set one:

1. "Divided Sky" (Anastasio) - 17:01
2. "Tube" (Anastasio, Fishman) - 3:59
3. "Tela" (Anastasio) - 6:32
4. "Maze" (Anastasio, Marshall) - 11:08
5. "Fast Enough for You" (Anastasio, Marshall) - 6:52
6. "The Old Home Place" (Jayne, Webb) - 3:02
7. "Punch You in the Eye" (Anastasio) - 8:01
8. "Llama" (Anastasio) - 5:05
9. "Glide" (Anastasio, Fishman, Gordon, Marshall, McConnell) - 4:20
10. "Slave to the Traffic Light" (Abrahams, Anastasio, Pollak) - 12:36

=== Disc two ===
Set two:

1. "AC/DC Bag" (Anastasio) - 12:07
2. "The Lizards" (Anastasio) - 10:30
3. "Mike's Song" (Gordon) - 22:46
4. "Lifeboy" (Anastasio, Marshall) - 7:56
5. "Weekapaug Groove" (Anastasio, Fishman, Gordon, McConnell) - 8:18
6. "Somewhere over the Rainbow" (Arlen, Harburg) - 1:39

=== Disc three ===
Set two, continued:

1. "Waste" (Anastasio, Marshall) - 5:35
2. "Train Song" (Gordon, Linitz) - 3:08
3. "Strange Design" (Anastasio, Marshall) - 3:48
4. "Sweet Adeline" (Armstrong, Gerard) - 2:30
5. "David Bowie" (Anastasio) - 16:42

Encore:

6. "Sleeping Monkey" (Anastasio, Marshall) - 4:55
7. "Rocky Top" (Bryant, Bryant) - 3:06

Filler (August 12, 1996, Deer Creek Music Center, Noblesville, Indiana):

8. "Ya Mar" (Ferguson) - 9:14
9. "Split Open and Melt" (Anastasio) - 12:42

== Personnel ==
- Trey Anastasio - guitars, lead vocals, acoustic guitar on "Waste", "Train Song" and "Strange Design", acapella vocals on "Sweet Adeline"
- Page McConnell - piano, organ, backing vocals, theremin on "Somewhere Over the Rainbow", lead vocals on "Tela" and "Strange Design", acapella vocals on "Sweet Adeline"
- Mike Gordon - bass, backing vocals, lead vocals on "Old Home Place", "Mike's Song", "Train Song" and "Ya Mar", acapella vocals on "Sweet Adeline"
- Jon Fishman - drums, backing vocals, acapella vocals on "Sweet Adeline"

== Setlist from the 'Helping Phriendly Book' ==
- 'The Helping Phriendly Book' (HPB) is a detailed setlist archive maintained by fans at phish.net.

Tuesday, 13 August 1996 Deer Creek Music Center, Noblesville, IN

SET 1: The Divided Sky, Tube, Tela > Maze, Fast Enough for You, The Old Home Place, Punch You In the Eye, Llama, Glide, Slave to the Traffic Light

SET 2: AC/DC Bag, The Lizards, Mike's Song -> Lifeboy, Weekapaug Groove -> Somewhere Over the Rainbow, Waste, Train Song, Strange Design, Sweet Adeline, David Bowie

ENCORE: Sleeping Monkey, Rocky Top

Notes: Page performed "Somewhere Over the Rainbow" solo on the theremin.
"Waste" through "Strange Design" were performed on the acoustic mini-stage.
