= Live Phish 10.31.90 =

Live album by Phish
- Released: October 31, 1999
- Recorded: October 31, 1990
- Venues: Armstrong Hall, Colorado College, at Colorado Springs, CO, United States
- Genres: Progressive rock; Jam band
- Label: JEMP
- Producer: Phish

Live Phish Series chronology
Live Phish 10.30.90 (1999)	Live Phish Volume 1 (2001)

Live Phish 10.31.90 is an archival live album release by the American rock band Phish. The show was originally webcast on October 10, 1999. It was also released in MP3 format in 1999 through eMusic, making it the first archival recording released officially online. The show was later made available when Phish launched its LivePhish website and is currently available exclusively through that site. This archival release is also believed to have been the first ever commercial download release of a full, live concert by any band.

This was the first Phish Halloween show to take place outside Vermont, and although this is a Halloween show, it does not feature Phish donning a "musical costume", as they later would do in 1994, 1995, 1996, 1998, 2009, 2010, 2013, 2014, 2016, 2018, and 2021. The show was part of a five-day tour through Colorado, a state where the band toured often in the early years. It was an all-ages show on the campus of Colorado College. The tickets for the show indicated “Costume Required”. Keyboardist Page McConnell's costume consisted of pumpkin-shaped glasses and an orange shirt. Before the second set, there was a Halloween costume contest on stage during which finalists had to come onstage to jump on mini-trampolines. The song "You Enjoy Myself" contained a musical quotation of the Munsters theme from Mike Gordon, and the end contained a vocal jam based on "A Night in Tunisia". "Tweezer" contained "Heartbreaker" teases from the band.

== Track listing ==
Disc one

Set one:

1. "Buried Alive" (Trey Anastasio) – 2:41
2. "Possum" (Jeff Holdsworth) – 9:36
3. "The Squirming Coil" (Anastasio, Tom Marshall) – 5:59
4. "The Lizards" (Anastasio) – 10:12
5. "Stash" (Anastasio, Marshall) – 8:23
6. "Bouncing Around the Room" (Anastasio, Marshall) – 3:53
7. "You Enjoy Myself" (Anastasio) – 16:26
8. "The Asse Festival" (Anastasio) – 1:49
9. "My Sweet One" (Jon Fishman) – 2:16
10. "Cavern" (Anastasio, Marshall, Scott Herman) – 4:31
11. "Run Like an Antelope" (Anastasio, Steve Pollak) – 9:57

Disc two

Set two:

1. "The Landlady" (Anastasio) – 3:46
2. "Reba" (Anastasio) – 10:15
3. "Runaway Jim" (Anastasio, Dave Abrahams) – 6:26
4. "Foam" (Anastasio) – 8:54
5. "Tweezer" (Anastasio, Fishman, Gordon, Page McConnell) – 10:43
6. "Fee" (Anastasio) – 5:12
7. "The Oh Kee Pa Ceremony" (Anastasio) – 1:43
8. "Suzy Greenberg" (Pollak) – 5:34
9. "Love You" (Syd Barrett) – 11:29

Disc three

Set two, continued:

1. "Mike's Song" (Gordon) – 6:04
2. "I Am Hydrogen" (Anastasio, Marshall, Marc Daubert) – 2:39
3. "Weekapaug Groove" (Anastasio, Fishman, Gordon, McConnell) – 6:36

Encore:

4. "Uncle Pen" (Bill Monroe) – 5:32
5. "Big Black Furry Creature from Mars" (Gordon) – 3:52

Track listing reflects that of the downloadable album cover offered by LivePhish for burned CDs. This album has not received a CD release.

== Personnel ==
- Trey Anastasio – guitars, lead vocals
- Page McConnell – piano, organ, backing vocals
- Mike Gordon – bass, backing vocals, co-lead vocals on "My Sweet One", lead vocals on "Uncle Pen" and "Big Black Furry Creature from Mars"
- Jon Fishman – drums, backing vocals
