= Phish: Live in Brooklyn =

Live album by Phish
- Released: July 11, 2006 (U.S.)
- Recorded: June 17, 2004
- Genre: Rock
- Label: JEMP; Rhino
- Producer: Phish

Phish chronology
New Year's Eve 1995 (2005)	Phish: Live in Brooklyn (2006)	Colorado '88 (2006)

Alternative covers
- LivePhish.com Downloads cover

Professional ratings
Review scores
Source	Rating
Allmusic	3.5/5 stars
Billboard	(not rated)

Live in Brooklyn is the name of a concert CD released on July 11, 2006, by American rock band Phish, with a simultaneous release as their second full concert DVD. Performed on June 17, 2004, at the minor league baseball field KeySpan Park in Brooklyn, New York, it was the opening night of what was promoted as the band's final tour, before their 2004 breakup. The concert was simulcast in movie theatres across America.

The following night, June 18, at the same venue, the band performed again, with a surprise appearance from rapper Jay-Z. This can be heard on Live Phish Downloads: 06.18.04.

In addition to being a CD release, this concert is available as a download in FLAC and MP3 formats at LivePhish.com. Selected songs are also available in MPEG-4 video.

== Track listing ==
=== Disc One ===
1. "A Song I Heard the Ocean Sing" (Anastasio, Marshall) - 6:34
2. "Dinner and a Movie" (Anastasio, Pollak) - 3:55
3. "The Curtain With" - (Anastasio, Daubert) - 13:44
4. "Sample in a Jar" - (Anastasio, Marshall) - 4:57
5. "The Moma Dance" (Anastasio, Fishman, Gordon, Marshall, McConnell) - 15:01 ->
6. "Free" (Anastasio, Marshall) - 10:26
7. "Nothing" (Anastasio, Marshall) - 5:34
8. "Maze" (Anastasio, Marshall) - 10:22
9. "Frankenstein" (Winter) - 4:59

=== Disc Two ===
1. "46 Days" (Anastasio) - 17:24 ->
2. "Possum" (Holdsworth) - 8:16
3. "The Oh Kee Pa Ceremony" (Anastasio) - 1:47 ->
4. "Suzy Greenberg" (Anastasio, Pollak) - 18:23 ->
5. "Axilla I" (Anastasio, Herman, Marshall) - 3:25 ->
6. "2001" (Deodato) - 8:59 ->
7. "Birds of a Feather" (Anastasio, Fishman, Gordon, Marshall, McConnell) - 7:05
8. "Kung" (Fishman) - 3:01

=== Disc Three ===
1. "Mike's Song" (Gordon) - 9:05 ->
2. "I Am Hydrogen" (Anastasio, Daubert, Marshall) - 2:42 ->
3. "Weekapaug Groove" (Anastasio, Fishman, Gordon, McConnell) - 12:43
4. "Divided Sky" (Anastasio) - 15:34

== Personnel ==
Phish

- Trey Anastasio - lead vocals, guitars
- Page McConnell - keyboards, backing vocals
- Mike Gordon - bass guitar, backing vocals, lead vocals on "Possum" and "Mike's Song"
- Jon Fishman - drums, backing vocals, lead vocals on "The Moma Dance"

== See also ==
- Phish
- Phish discography
- Live Phish Series
