= Chicago '94 =

Live album by Phish
- Released: July 31, 2012
- Recorded: June 18, 1994, November 25, 1994
- Genre: Rock
- Label: JEMP
- Producer: Phish

Phish chronology
Hampton/Winston-Salem '97 (2011)	Chicago '94 (2012)	Ventura (2013)

Chicago '94 is a live album by the rock band Phish. It contains two complete concerts on six CDs, and was recorded at the UIC Pavilion in Chicago, Illinois on June 18 and November 25, 1994. It was released by JEMP Records on July 31, 2012.

== Critical reception ==
Professional ratings
Review scores
Source	Rating
Allmusic	4/5 stars

On Allmusic, Fred Thomas wrote, "These two-track soundboard recordings (remastered for this release) find Phish in one of their more playful and energetic times, rising to the height of their popularity and playing together with almost telepathic synchronicity. They were also at some of their most athletic levels of playing, with set lists full of their most frenetic tunes and most epic jams.... These shows are absolutely on fire, and a clear choice for the kind of expansive retroactive issue that warrants a six-disc box set.... [T]he level of energy put forth over the course of Chicago '94 is undeniable, and the high points are some of the most brilliant in the band's catalog."

On All About Jazz, Doug Collette said, "[T]his six-CD set — like the similarly conceived Hampton/Winston-Salem '97 (JEMP, 2011) — makes its statement through the largely brilliant musicianship contained therein, with virtually no accompanying content to place it in a historical perspective. Chicago '94 evinces a continuity in the content with its sound check filler (a misnomer when workouts on Led Zeppelin's "How Many More Times" become functional in recurring teases), thus fully presenting a broad view of this band's evolution at approximately ten years past its original formation."

In The Maine Edge, Mike Dow wrote, "The stage offered complete freedom and an audience willing to go wherever the band felt like taking them. The two shows featured on Chicago '94, recorded on June 18 and November 25 of 1994 at the UIC Pavilion, reveal a band in peak form — completely in sync, in good humor and confident that, if one of them fell, the other three would be there to catch them. If the entire band fell, they knew the audience would forgive them.... Keith Richards once said, 'On any given night it's a different band that's the greatest rock and roll band in the world.' Chicago '94 is evidence that, for those two nights, Phish could have claimed the title."

== Track listing ==
=== Disc one ===
June 18, 1994 – first set:

1. "Wilson" (Anastasio, Marshall, Woolf) – 5:11
2. "Rift" (Anastasio, Marshall) – 5:55
3. "AC/DC Bag" (Anastasio) – 6:31
4. "Maze" (Anastasio, Marshall) – 11:22
5. "The Mango Song" (Anastasio) – 7:26
6. "Down with Disease" (Anastasio, Marshall) – 7:15
7. "It's Ice" (Anastasio, Marshall) – 8:38
8. "Dog Faced Boy" (Anastasio, Fishman, McConnell, Marshall) – 2:18
9. "Divided Sky" (Anastasio) – 14:34
10. "Sample in a Jar" (Anastasio, Marshall) – 5:13

=== Disc two ===
June 18, 1994 – second set:

1. "Peaches en Regalia" (Zappa) – 4:05
2. "David Bowie" (Anastasio) – 18:27
3. "Horn" (Anastasio, Marshall) – 4:07
4. "McGrupp and the Watchful Hosemasters" (Anastasio, Marshall) – 9:05
5. "Tweezer" (Anastasio, Gordon, Fishman, McConnell) – 14:15
6. "Lifeboy" (Anastasio, Marshall) – 8:23

=== Disc three ===
June 18, 1994 – second set, continued:

1. "You Enjoy Myself" (Anastasio) – 20:58
2. "Chalk Dust Torture" (Anastasio, Marshall) – 7:21

June 18, 1994 – encore:

3. "Bouncing Around the Room" (Anastasio, Marshall) – 3:39
4. "Tweezer Reprise" (Anastasio, Fishman, Gordon, McConnell) – 3:19

June 18, 1994 – soundcheck:

5. "All Things Reconsidered" (Anastasio) – 3:34
6. "How Many More Times" (Jones, Bonham, Page, Plant) – 3:51
7. "Poor Heart" (Gordon) – 2:22

=== Disc four ===
November 25, 1994 – first set:

1. "Llama" (Anastasio) – 5:35
2. "Guelah Papyrus" (Anastasio, Marshall) – 5:46
3. "Reba" (Anastasio) – 14:08
4. "Bouncing Around the Room" (Anastasio, Marshall) – 3:40
5. "Split Open and Melt" (Anastasio) – 11:15
6. "Esther" (Anastasio) – 8:49
7. "Julius" (Anastasio, Marshall) – 7:27
8. "Golgi Apparatus" (Anastasio, Marshall, Szuter, Woolf) – 4:47

=== Disc five ===
November 25, 1994 – second set:

1. "2001" (Deodato) – 4:51
2. "Mike's Song" (Gordon) – 7:23
3. "Simple" (Gordon) – 14:23
4. "Harpua" (Anastasio, Fishman) – 15:59
5. "Weekapaug Groove" (Anastasio, Fishman, Gordon, McConnell) – 10:31
6. "The Mango Song" (Anastasio) – 7:23
7. "Purple Rain" (Prince) – 5:43
8. "Hold Your Head Up" (Argent, White) – 1:06

=== Disc six ===
November 25, 1994 – second set continued:

1. "Run Like an Antelope" (Anastasio, Marshall, Pollak) – 13:11

November 25, 1994 – encore:

2. "Good Times Bad Times" (Bonham, Jones, Page, Plant) – 5:55

November 25, 1994 – soundcheck:

3. "Chicago '94 Soundcheck Jam" (Anastasio, Fishman, Gordon, McConnell) – 8:23
4. "Dog Log" (Anastasio) – 4:58

== Personnel ==
Phish

- Trey Anastasio – guitar, lead vocals (all tracks except where noted), co-lead vocals on "Rift", narration on "Harpua", drums on "Purple Rain" and "Hold Your Head Up"
- Page McConnell – keyboards, backing vocals, co-lead vocals on "Rift", lead vocals on "It's Ice"
- Mike Gordon – bass, backing vocals, lead vocals on 'Poor Heart" and "Mike's Song"
- Jon Fishman – drums, backing vocals, lead vocals on "Purple Rain", vacuum on "Purple Rain"

Production

- Producer: Phish
- Recording: Paul Languedoc
- Mastering: Fred Kevorkian
- Post-production: Kevin Shapiro
- Illustrations: Jim Pollock
- Photography: Dave Vann, Philin Phlash, C. Taylor Crothers
- Art direction and design: Julia Mordaunt
