= Hampton/Winston-Salem '97 =

Live album by Phish
- Released: December 6, 2011
- Recorded: November 21–23, 1997
- Genre: Rock
- Label: JEMP
- Producer: Phish

Phish chronology
Joy (2009)	Hampton/Winston-Salem '97 (2011)	Chicago '94 (2012)

Hampton/Winston-Salem '97 is a 7-CD live box set album from the American jam band Phish, recorded live at the Hampton Coliseum in Hampton, VA on November 21–22, 1997 and Lawrence Joel Veterans Memorial Coliseum, Winston-Salem, NC on November 23, 1997, in the midst of Phish's 1997 Fall "Phish Destroys America" Tour.

In addition to being a CD release, this box is available as a download in FLAC and MP3 formats at LivePhish.com. The CD format is currently out of print.

== Track listing ==
=== Disc one ===
November 21, 1997 – first set:

1. "Emotional Rescue" (Jagger, Richards) - 17:45 →
2. "Split Open and Melt" (Anastasio) - 13:44
3. "Beauty of My Dreams" (McCoury) - 3:27
4. "Dogs Stole Things" (Anastasio, Marshall) - 4:48
5. "Punch You in the Eye" (Anastasio) - 9:13 →
6. "Lawn Boy" (Anastasio, Marshall) - 3:45 →
7. "Chalk Dust Torture" (Anastasio, Marshall) - 9:16
8. "Prince Caspian" (Anastasio, Marshall) - 10:20

=== Disc two ===
November 21, 1997 – second set:

1. "Ghost" (Anastasio, Marshall) - 15:57 →
2. "AC/DC Bag" (Anastasio) - 25:41 →
3. "Slave to the Traffic Light" (Abrahams, Anastasio, Pollak) - 12:32
4. "Loving Cup" (Jagger, Richards) - 7:39

November 21, 1997 – encore:

5. "Guyute" (Anastasio, Marshall) - 11:22

=== Disc three ===
November 22, 1997 – first set:

1. "Mike's Song" (Gordon) - 17:04 →
2. "I Am Hydrogen" (Anastasio, Daubert, Marshall) - 4:31 →
3. "Weekapaug Groove" (Anastasio, Fishman, Gordon, McConnell) - 14:52
4. "Harry Hood" (Anastasio, Fishman, Gordon, Long, McConnell) - 18:05 →
5. "Train Song" (Gordon, Linitz) - 3:06
6. "Billy Breathes" (Anastasio) - 7:05
7. "Frankenstein" (Winter) - 4:47 →
8. "Izabella" (Hendrix) - 5:50

=== Disc four ===
November 22, 1997 – second set:

1. "Halley's Comet" (Wright) - 26:00
2. "Tweezer" (Anastasio, Fishman, Gordon, McConnell) - 11:43 →
3. "Black-Eyed Katy" (Anastasio, Fishman, Gordon, McConnell) - 6:56 →
4. "Piper" (Anastasio, Marshall) - 7:53 →
5. "Run Like an Antelope" (Anastasio, Marshall, Pollak) - 13:38

November 22, 1997 – encore:

6. "Bouncing Around the Room" (Anastasio, Marshall) - 3:52 →
7. "Tweezer Reprise" (Anastasio, Fishman, Gordon, McConnell) - 4:06

=== Disc five ===
November 23, 1997 – first set:

1. "My Soul" (Chenier) - 7:23
2. "Theme from the Bottom" (Anastasio, Fishman, Gordon, Marshall, McConnell) - 10:22 →
3. "Black-Eyed Katy" (Anastasio, Fishman, Gordon, McConnell) - 10:55
4. "Sparkle" (Anastasio, Marshall) - 4:02
5. "Twist" (Anastasio, Marshall) - 10:21
6. "Stash" (Anastasio, Marshall) - 17:03 →
7. "NICU" (Anastasio, Marshall) - 5:50

=== Disc six ===
November 23, 1997 – first set, continued:

1. "Fluffhead" (Anastasio, Pollak) - 15:43 →
2. "Character Zero" (Anastasio, Marshall) - 7:22

November 23, 1997 – second set:

3. "Bathtub Gin" (Anastasio, Goodman) - 31:43 →
4. "Down with Disease" (Anastasio, Marshall) - 11:49 →
5. "Low Rider" (Allen, Brown, Dickerson, Jordan, Miller, Oskar, Scott) - 7:42 →
6. "Down with Disease" (Anastasio, Marshall) - 3:43

=== Disc seven ===
November 23, 1997 – second set, continued:

1. "Bold as Love" (Hendrix) - 8:03

November 23, 1997 – encore:

2. "Julius" (Anastasio, Marshall) - 11:06

November 21, 1997 – soundcheck:

3. "Hampton '97 Soundcheck Jam" (Anastasio, Fishman, Gordon, McConnell) - 17:45

November 23, 1997 – soundcheck:

4. "Back at the Chicken Shack" (Smith) - 10:32

"Weekapaug Groove" is misspelled as "Weekapaugh Groove" on this album.

== Personnel ==
Phish

- Trey Anastasio - lead vocals, guitars
- Page McConnell - keyboards, lead vocals on "Lawn Boy" and "Bold As Love"
- Mike Gordon - bass guitar, lead vocals on "Emotional Rescue", "Mike's Song", and "Train Song"
- Jon Fishman - drums, vocals

== Production credits ==
- Audio recorded by Paul Languedoc
- Mastered by Fred Kevorkian
- Post-production by Kevin Shapiro
- Design by Dan Black at LandLand!
- Art direction by Julia Mordaunt
- Management by Coran Capshaw for Red Light Management with Jason Colton and Patrick Jordan
- 1997 Management by John Paluska for Dionysian Productions with Shelly Culbertson, Jason Colton, Beth Montuori Rowles, and Karen Linehan
