= At the Roxy =

Live album by Phish
- Released: November 18, 2008 (US)
- Recorded: February 19–21, 1993
- Venues: Coca Cola Roxy Theatre in Atlanta, Georgia
- Genre: Rock
- Label: JEMP

Phish chronology
Vegas 96 (2007)	At the Roxy (2008)	Joy (2009)

Professional ratings
Review scores
Source	Rating
Allmusic	3.5/5 stars
Rolling Stone	4/5 stars

At the Roxy is an 8-disc box set from American rock band Phish, which was recorded live over the course of their three-show run at the Coca Cola Roxy Theatre in Atlanta, Georgia, from February 19 to February 21, 1993.

== Track listing ==
=== Disc one (February 19, 1993) ===
1. "Loving Cup" (Jagger, Richards) - 6:39
2. "Rift" (Anastasio, Marshall) - 6:08
3. "Split Open and Melt" (Anastasio) - 8:49
4. "Fee" (Anastasio) - 5:11
5. "Maze" (Anastasio, Marshall) - 8:53
6. "Colonel Forbin's Ascent" (Anastasio) - 5:35
7. "Fly Famous Mockingbird" (Anastasio) - 13:29
8. "Sparkle" (Anastasio, Marshall) - 4:08

=== Disc two ===
1. "My Friend, My Friend" (Anastasio, Marshall) - 6:50
2. "Poor Heart" (Gordon) - 2:34
3. "David Bowie/Moby Dick" (Anastasio, Bonham, Jones, Page) - 15:49
4. "Runaway Jim" (Abrahams, Anastasio) - 8:12
5. "It's Ice" (Anastasio, Marshall) - 7:44
6. "Paul and Silas" (Traditional) - 3:02
7. "You Enjoy Myself" (Anastasio) - 21:17
8. "Ya Mar" (Ferguson) - 6:35

=== Disc three ===
1. "Big Ball Jam" (Anastasio, Fishman, Gordon, McConnell) - 2:55
2. "Lawn Boy" (Anastasio, Marshall) - 3:26
3. "Funky Bitch" (Seals) - 6:36
4. "My Sweet One" (Fishman) - 3:38
5. "Hold Your Head Up/Love You/Hold Your Head Up" (Argent, Barrett, White) - 9:46
6. "Llama" (Anastasio) - 6:20
7. "Amazing Grace" (Traditional) - 3:21
8. "AC/DC Bag" (Anastasio) - 6:50

=== Disc four (February 20, 1993) ===
1. "Golgi Apparatus" (Anastasio, Marshall, Szuter, Woolf) - 5:19
2. "Foam" (Anastasio) - 8:50
3. "The Sloth" (Anastasio) - 3:43
4. "Possum" (Holdsworth) - 10:21
5. "Weigh" (Gordon) - 5:04
6. "All Things Reconsidered" (Anastasio) - 2:48
7. "Divided Sky" (Anastasio) - 13:33
8. "The Horse" (Anastasio, Marshall) - 1:38
9. "Silent in the Morning" (Anastasio, Marshall) - 5:09
10. "Fluffhead" (Anastasio, Pollak) - 14:20
11. "Cavern" (Anastasio, Herman, Marshall) - 4:44

=== Disc five ===
1. "Wilson" (Anastasio, Marshall, Woolf) - 7:21
2. "Reba" (Anastasio) - 13:35
3. "Tweezer" (Anastasio, Fishman, Gordon, McConnell) - 5:29
4. "Walk Away" (Walsh) - 3:41
5. "Tweezer" (Anastasio, Fishman, Gordon, McConnell) - 1:44
6. "Glide" (Anastasio, Fishman, Gordon, Marshall, McConnell) - 4:43
7. "Mike's Song" (Gordon) - 7:57
8. "My Mind's Got a Mind of Its Own" (Hancock) - 1:09
9. "Mike's Song" (Gordon) - :49
10. "I Am Hydrogen" (Anastasio, Daubert, Marshall) - :28
11. "Vibration of Life" (Anastasio, Fishman, Gordon, McConnell) - :59
12. "Kung" (Fishman) - 1:38
13. "I Am Hydrogen" (Anastasio, Daubert, Marshall) - 3:00
14. "Weekapaug Groove" (Anastasio, Fishman, Gordon, McConnell) - 2:58
15. "Have Mercy" (Lloyd Ferguson, Donald Shaw, Fitzroy Simpson) - 1:54
16. "Weekapaug Groove" (Anastasio, Fishman, Gordon, McConnell) - 1:02
17. "Rock and Roll All Nite" (Simmons, Stanley) - :53
18. "Weekapaug Groove" (Anastasio, Fishman, Gordon, McConnell) - 1:32

=== Disc six ===
1. "Fast Enough for You" (Anastasio, Marshall) - 5:09
2. "Big Ball Jam" (Anastasio, Fishman, Gordon, McConnell) - 2:46
3. "Hold Your Head Up/Terrapin/Hold Your Head Up" (Argent, Barrett, White) - 12:34
4. "Harry Hood" (Anastasio, Fishman, Gordon, Long, McConnell) - 13:14
5. "Tweezer Reprise" (Anastasio, Fishman, Gordon, McConnell) - 3:51
6. "Sleeping Monkey" (Anastasio, Marshall) - 6:32

=== Disc seven (February 21, 1993) ===
1. "Suzy Greenberg" (Anastasio, Pollak) - 6:10
2. "Buried Alive" (Anastasio) - 2:58
3. "Punch You in the Eye" (Anastasio) - 7:14
4. "Uncle Pen" (Monroe) - 4:06
5. "Horn" (Anastasio, Marshall) - 3:36
6. "Chalk Dust Torture" (Anastsio, Marshall) - 7:23
7. "Esther" (Anastasio) - 10:44
8. "Dinner and a Movie" (Anastasio, Pollak) - 3:16
9. "Bouncing Around the Room" (Anastasio, Marshall) - 3:35
10. "Run Like an Antelope" (Anastasio, Marshall, Pollak) - 12:41

=== Disc eight ===
1. "Axilla I" (Anastasio, Herman, Marshall) - 4:43
2. "The Curtain" (Anastasio, Daubert) - 6:17
3. "Stash" (Anastasio, Marshall) - 10:38
4. "Manteca" (Fuller, Gillespie, Pozo) - :45
5. "Stash" (Anastasio, Marshall) - :55
6. "The Lizards" (Anastasio) - 10:58
7. "Bathtub Gin" (Anastasio, Goodman) - 6:16
8. "Hold Your Head Up/Cracklin' Rosie/Hold Your Head Up" (Argent, Diamond, White) - 9:34
9. "The Squirming Coil" (Anastasio, Marshall) - 8:44
10. "Big Black Furry Creature From Mars" (Gordon) - 5:47
11. "Sweet Adeline" (Armstrong, Gerard) - 3:17
12. "Good Times Bad Times" (Bonham, Jones, Page) - 3:55
13. "Paul and Silas" (Traditional) - 2:22
14. "Pig in a Pen" (Traditional) - 3:21

== Personnel ==
Phish

- Trey Anastasio - guitars, lead vocals, narration on "Fly Famous Mockingbird", acapella vocals on "Amazing Grace" and "Sweet Adeline", drums on "Hold Your Head Up", "Love You", "Terrapin" and "Cracklin' Rosie", acoustic guitar on "My Friend, My Friend" and "The Horse"
- Page McConnell - keyboards, backing vocals, co-lead vocals on "Loving Cup" and "Rift", lead vocals on "It's Ice", "Lawn Boy", "Silent in the Morning" and "Walk Away", acapella vocals on "Amazing Grace" and "Sweet Adeline"
- Mike Gordon - bass guitar, backing vocals, lead vocals on "Poor Heart", "Ya Mar", "Funky Bitch", "Possum", "Weigh", "Mike's Song", "My Mind's Got a Mind of Its Own" and "Uncle Pen", acapella vocals on "Amazing Grace" and "Sweet Adeline"
- Jon Fishman - drums, backing vocals, acapella vocals on "Amazing Grace" and "Sweet Adeline", lead vocals on "Love You", "Terrapin" and "Cracklin' Rosie", vacuum and guitar on "Love You"

Special guests

- Jimmy Herring - guitar on "Funky Bitch", "My Sweet One", "Hold Your Head Up", "Love You" and "Llama"
- Jay Von Lehe - lead vocals on "Rock and Roll All Nite"
- Jeff Mosier - banjo on "Good Times, Bad Times", "Paul and Silas" and "Pig in a Pen", lead vocals on "Pig in a Pen"
