= Live Phish Volume 1 =

Live Phish Vol. 1

Live album by Phish
- Released: September 18, 2001
- Recorded: December 14, 1995
- Genre: Rock, jam
- Length: 2:24:45
- Label: Elektra
- Producer: Phish

Live Phish Series chronology
Live Phish 10.31.90 (1999)	Live Phish Volume 1 (2001)	Live Phish Volume 2 (2001)

Professional ratings
Review scores
Source	Rating
Allmusic	4/5 stars

Live Phish Vol. 1 was recorded live at the Broome County Veterans Memorial Arena in Binghamton, New York on December 14, 1995. The show occurred towards the end of the band's 1995 fall tour, which featured a tour-long chess game between Phish and its audience. The second disc begins with a fan making a chess move onstage on behalf of the audience.

The show contains a rare (for 1995) extended jam out of "Halley's Comet", as well as the final appearance of "Keyboard Army"—a collaborative piece that debuted earlier the same year and features all four band members on keyboards—until 2015.

The release reached a peak position of #97 on the Billboard 200 album chart. The album marked the first time that longtime Phish concert staples "Suzy Greenberg", "Makisupa Policeman", "Tela", "The Curtain" and "Halley's Comet" had appeared on an official Phish release. The version of "Taste" that appears on the release is referred to by fans as "Taste That Surrounds", and is an alternate version of the song with different lyrics that was only performed on the fall 1995 tour.

== Track listing ==
Disc one

Set one:

1. "Suzy Greenberg" (Trey Anastasio, Steve Pollak) – 7:22 →
2. "Llama" (Anastasio) – 5:52
3. "Horn" (Anastasio, Tom Marshall) – 3:29 →
4. "Foam" (Anastasio) – 10:53
5. "Makisupa Policeman" (Anastasio, Marshall) – 6:43 →
6. "Split Open and Melt" (Anastasio) – 14:41
7. "Tela" (Anastasio) – 6:30
8. "Taste" (Anastasio, Jon Fishman, Mike Gordon, Page McConnell, Marshall) – 8:00
9. "My Sweet One" (Fishman) – 2:23
10. "Frankenstein" (Edgar Winter) – 5:02

Disc two

Set two:

1. "The Curtain" (Anastasio, Marc Daubert) – 7:18 →
2. "Tweezer" (Anastasio, Fishman, Gordon, McConnell) – 9:16 →
3. "Timber" (Josh White) – 4:57 →
4. "Tweezer" (Anastasio, Fishman, Gordon, McConnell) – 9:47 →
5. "Keyboard Army" (Anastasio, Fishman, Gordon, McConnell) – 3:48
6. "Halley's Comet" (Richard "Nancy" Wright) – 11:53 →
7. "NICU" (Anastasio, Marshall) – 9:10 →
8. "Slave to the Traffic Light" (Abrahams, Anastasio, Pollak) – 11:25

Encore:

9. "Bold as Love" (Jimi Hendrix) – 6:16

Note: The version of "Taste" here is a variation entitled "Taste That Surrounds", which has different lyrics and structure.

== Personnel ==
- Trey Anastasio - guitars, lead vocals, keyboards on "Keyboard Army"
- Page McConnell - piano, organ, backing vocals, lead vocals on "Tela" and "Bold as Love"
- Mike Gordon - bass, backing vocals, keyboards on "Keyboard Army"
- Jon Fishman - drums, vacuum, vocals, co-lead vocals on "Taste", keyboards on "Keyboard Army"

== Setlist from Phish.net ==
- Phish.net hosts a detailed setlist archive maintained by fans.

Thursday, 12/14/1995 Broome County Arena, Binghamton, NY

SET 1: Suzy Greenberg > Llama, Horn > Foam, Makisupa Policeman > Split Open and Melt, Tela, Taste That Surrounds, My Sweet One, Frankenstein

SET 2: The Curtain > Tweezer -> Timber (Jerry the Mule) -> Tweezer -> Keyboard Army, Halley's Comet -> NICU -> Slave to the Traffic Light

ENCORE: Bold As Love

Notes: The jam into Timber included a Slipknot! tease. Bold As Love was played for a fan up front with a sign requesting it. A humorous scene ensued when another fan got excited, as if Trey was referring to his Brother sign. Trey remarked that when fans bring signs, it has to be for a song the band wants to play.

== See also ==
- Phish.net Song History: "Keyboard Army"
- Phish.net Song History: "Halley's Comet"
