= Stash (Phish album) =

Compilation album by Phish
- Released: Spring 1996
- Recorded: 1988–1994
- Genre: Jazz fusion, jam, rock
- Label: Elektra

Phish chronology
A Live One (1995)	Stash (1996)	Billy Breathes (1996)

Stash is a compilation album from the rock band Phish containing songs from their 1988–1995 official releases. It was released exclusively in Europe to promote the band's 1996 spring tour, which included shows both as headliners and openers for Santana.

AllMusic rated the album four stars and noted, "Though it doesn't work quite as well as their live performances, the album nevertheless contains many of their most popular songs and offers a good introduction to the band."

== Track listing ==
No.	Title	Writer(s)	Original Album	Length
1.	"Down with Disease"	Trey Anastasio; Tom Marshall	Hoist	4:07
2.	"If I Could"	Anastasio	Hoist	4:09
3.	"You Enjoy Myself"	Anastasio	Junta	9:50
4.	"Fast Enough for You"	Anastasio; Marshall	Rift	4:51
5.	"Scent of a Mule"	Mike Gordon	Hoist	4:02
6.	"Split Open and Melt"	Anastasio	Lawn Boy	4:42
7.	"Maze"	Anastasio; Marshall	Rift	8:13
8.	"Sample in a Jar"	Anastasio; Marshall	Hoist	4:51
9.	"Bouncing Around the Room" (live, December 31, 1994, at the Boston Garden)	Anastasio; Marshall	A Live One	4:08
10.	"Stash" (live, July 8, 1994, at Great Woods in Mansfield, Massachusetts)	Anastasio; Marshall	A Live One	12:31
11.	"Gumbo" (live, December 2, 1994, at University of California, Davis, Recreation Hall)	Anastasio; Jon Fishman	A Live One	5:14

== Personnel ==
=== Phish ===
- Trey Anastasio – guitars, lead vocals
- Page McConnell – keyboards, backing vocals
- Mike Gordon – bass guitar, backing vocals, lead vocals on "Scent of a Mule"
- Jon Fishman – drums, backing vocals

=== Additional musicians ===
- Rose Stone – backing vocals on "Down with Disease"
- Jean McClain – backing vocals on "Down with Disease"
- Alison Krauss – additional vocals on "If I Could"
- Gordon Stone – pedal steel guitar on "Fast Enough for You"
- Dave Grippo – alto saxophone on "Split Open and Melt" and "Gumbo"
- Russell B. Remmington – tenor saxophone on "Split Open and Melt"
- Joseph Somerville Jr. – trumpet on "Split Open and Melt"
- Christine Lynch – backing vocals on "Split Open and Melt"
- Peter Apfelbaum – tenor saxophone on "Gumbo"
- Carl Gerhard – trumpet on "Gumbo"
- James Harvey – trombone on "Gumbo"
- Michael Ray – trumpet on "Gumbo"
