= Gamehendge =

Fictional setting for songs by Phish

Gamehendge is a fictional setting for a number of songs by the rock band Phish. The main set of songs can be traced back to The Man Who Stepped into Yesterday (or TMWSIY), the senior project of guitarist and primary vocalist Trey Anastasio, written while he attended Goddard College. The musical was recorded to a cassette tape and submitted along with Anastasio's senior thesis in July 1988. Many copies of TMWSIY were circulated among fans as Phish's popularity grew, but the album was never officially released by the band. Still, the band would frequently perform songs from the album live and, on a few occasions, performed the entire album live, though differently every time. New songs were added to the Gamehendge mythos in the years following the recording of the original 1988 tape.

== Story ==
The Man Who Stepped into Yesterday tells the story of Colonel Forbin, a retired colonel from Long Island, New York, who enters the land of Gamehendge and rescues a document called the Helping Friendly Book from an evil dictator named Wilson. The story was based on a nonsense poem written by Tom Marshall. Trey Anastasio used the poem as lyrics for a children's song he wrote with his mother called "Skippy the Wondermouse". With the new lyrics, the song was retitled "McGrupp and the Watchful Hosemasters". He then wrote a separate set of songs that would make sense of the poem and turn it into a narrative-driven musical for his senior project. These were the songs that made up TMWSIY:

1. "Narration" – 3:56 (Introduces the world of Gamehendge and the mountain that rises in the middle of a forest. The land was inhabited by a race of people called the Lizards, and the Lizards gave thanks to Icculus who lived at the top of the mountain. Icculus brought to the Lizards "The Helping Friendly Book" which allowed them to "surrender to the flow" and live in peace and tranquility. Wilson, a traveler from outside Gamehendge, gained their trust, stole the book and used it to become king of Prussia, a city he establishes after enslaving the Lizards.)
2. "The Man Who Stepped Into Yesterday" – 1:45 (Colonel Forbin, a retired colonel from Long Island, discovers a door on one of his ritualistic walks with his dog McGrupp. As time passes and he watches himself age, he can't stop thinking about the door. One day, after years of having felt imprisoned by the monotony of his lonely life, he decides to step through it.)
3. "The Lizards" – 5:50 (Forbin finds himself in a corridor where he meets an aging knight named Rutherford the Brave. Rutherford tells him of the Lizards who are now all but extinct due to Wilson and his theft of the Helping Friendly Book. He leads Forbin outside to a raging river. The knight dives in but due to his armor, he sinks.)
4. "Narration" – 3:06 (Rutherford is pulled out of the water by a hairy and powerful creature known as The Unit Monster. The Unit Monster protects and travels with Tela, a rebel who rides a two-toned multi-beast.)
5. "Tela" – 6:16 (Forbin falls in love with Tela when he first sees her and views her as a jewel of Wilson's foul domain. She was born in a hut in the shadow of Wilson's castle and was forced into a life of struggle and toil. She grew to hate Wilson and joined a rebellion against him.)
6. "Narration (Ride On A Multibeast)" – 3:26 (Tela leads Forbin and Rutherford to the Rebel's hidden base deep in the forest. As they approach, chants of "Wilson" can be heard. But the chants are not in praise of Wilson; they are chants of hatred.)
7. "Wilson" (Anastasio, Tom Marshall, Todd Woolf) – 3:13 (Forbin is introduced to the leader of the Rebellion, a Lizard named Errand Woolfe. He learns that Errand's son, Roger, was executed on suspicion of treason. Errand announces his hatred for Wilson for ordering the execution.)
8. "Narration" – 0:31 (Meanwhile, in Prussia, Wilson orders the execution of his accountant, Mr. Palmer, who was caught embezzling funds to the Rebellion.)
9. "AC/DC Bag" – 3:09 (Palmer is hung in the public square by the AC/DC Bag, a robotic hangman with a bag over its head. Wilson delivers a speech condemning him to death.)
10. "Narration" – 3:18 (Forbin visits Tela's hut and proclaims his love for her. But just then, Rutherford storms in and strangles both The Unit Monster and Tela to death. Forbin demands to know why and Errand explains that Tela was a spy who had been secretly sending information to Wilson using messenger birds called Spotted Stripers. Roger's death had raised suspicion, but Palmer's confirmed it. Enraged, Forbin storms out, promising to get the Helping Friendly Book for them.)
11. "Colonel Forbin's Ascent" – 4:36 (Forbin climbs up the mountain and speaks with Icculus. Icculus promises to help Forbin and the Lizards regain the knowledge that they lack, but he warns him that knowledge, though seemingly innocent and pure, can become a deadly weapon in the hands of avarice and greed. All the same, Icculus sends his friend, The Famous Mockingbird, to steal the Helping Friendly Book back from Wilson.)
12. "Fly Famous Mockingbird" – 7:37 (The Famous Mockingbird flies to Wilson's castle, takes the Helping Friendly Book, and flies it back to the Rebel base).
13. "Narration" – 1:31 (The next morning Errand and Rutherford are astonished to see the Helping Friendly Book laid before them. Errand seizes the book and fastens The Famous Mockingbird to a pole with glue and rubber bands. He puts the book to work for him and sets out to find a man who will kill Wilson.)
14. "The Sloth" – 2:16 (Errand finds the Sloth in the Prussian ghetto and hires him to kill Wilson. Wilson is assassinated and Errand Woolfe becomes the next tyrannical king of Prussia.)
15. "Narration" – 1:13 (Forbin finds himself in a dungeon cell, having realized his actions only led to replacing one evil dictator with another. He remembers the door and how once he knew it existed, he couldn't leave it alone. Just like Wilson, Tela and Errand. As he sits in the dungeon, he realizes he's back through the door. He hears the distant of chants of "Errand" in much the same way the rebels were chanting "Wilson" before.)
16. "Possum" (Jeff Holdsworth) – 4:29 (Icculus looks down at all that is below him and concludes that there ain't no truth in action, unless you believe it anyway. Additionally, he notes that when a possum was hit by a car, the road was his end and his end was the road, or so they say.)

All songs written by Trey Anastasio except where noted.

In the thesis that Trey submitted, he goes into more detail about the characters of Forbin and Tela:

"I decided that Colonel Forbin would fall in love with Tela the instant that he saw her. I view these characters as alter-egos. Everything that Tela is, Forbin isn't. Forbin is a naïve, love-stricken man, and Tela is a streetwise experienced woman who understands the ways of the world better than most others in the play, save Icculus, the author of the Helping Friendly Book. Forbin is entranced with the look in Tela's eyes, a look that speaks of knowledge of something more. She seems to have total control over the situation; he falls in love. Tela, on the other hand, couldn't care less about this bozo, and the B section of the song changes its point of view and we see inside Tela's head. We see her past, her life under Wilson's rule, and her growing hatred for the tyrant over the years."

And later in the thesis he explains the ending and Icculus:

"The main point I wanted to get across about Icculus was his ability to see beyond triviality. I saw Forbin as the most trivial thinker, Tela as the least trivial, except Icculus. "Your end is the road" is supposed to mean that something that seems important at the moment is all part of a greater flow of things, and that to be happy, one must just realize the inevitability of things. Tela realized that Wilson would just be replaced by another tyrant, so she began to respect him for taking advantage of an inevitable situation. Icculus says in the first song, "the trick is to surrender to the flow" and that is the key to the whole musical. I think that I had a very cynical view when I wrote this, because I really view Wilson, Tela, and Errand Woolfe as the ones who surrendered to the flow. By "surrender to the flow," I meant that they saw that no matter what action we take, the world remains filled with evil, and that it is a wise person who realizes this and subsequently takes advantage of the situation. I think of Forbin as a naïve and ignorant man, who just wouldn't admit to the way that the world really worked. Maybe it's just a stage, and maybe I'll learn someday that the world really is black and white, good vs. evil, a simple place to live and make choices."

It's possible Trey did indeed change his mind on the dark and cynical turn the story takes at the end as Possum was dropped from live performances of TMWSIY after 1990. Instead the band would end the story with "McGrupp and the Watchful Hosemasters" which would serve as a summary of the events that took place from the point of view of a Shepherd who had lived on the outskirts of Gamehendge and had adopted McGrupp.

In the 1994 performances of Gamehendge they would follow it up with "Divided Sky" which was a chant that was part of an ancient ritual that involved eating sacred root that contained the spirit of Icculus and then climbing a large black rhombus to pay homage to the gods of the night sky. These endings are a bit more optimistic than the original, even though Errand still winds up replacing Wilson as the new dictator and the cycle of war continues.

But the December 31, 2023 performance altered the story even more significantly. In that version, Wilson is not killed, Errand Woolfe (known simply as "The Wolf" in this version) doesn't become the new dictator and the Helping Friendly Book is returned to the Lizards who realize they had the knowledge they needed all along. This seems like the happiest ending of them all until it is revealed that Icculus's mountain is an active volcano and it erupts underneath the Lizards just as they are celebrating their victory.

== Additional Gamehendge Songs ==
In the years after the original The Man Who Stepped Into Yesterday tape was recorded, other songs were written that were connected to the Gamehendge story in some way. Here is a list of the songs that are confirmed to be a part of Gamehendge, though fans have speculated that there may be more and indeed some songs that were originally not part of Gamehendge have been retroactively connected to it.

1. "Divided Sky" (A chant performed by the Lizards as they stand on an enormous black rhombus, paying homage to the gods of the night sky)
2. "Llama" (Depicts a battle that takes place years after the overthrow of Wilson. In the December 31, 2023 performance, this song takes place when Tela, Forbin and Rutherford first arrive at the rebel base.)
3. "McGrupp and the Watchful Hosemasters" (The story of a shepherd who lives in Gamehendge, whose flock is watched over by Colonel Forbin's dog, McGrupp. The lyrics were originally a Tom Marshall poem that inspired the Gamehendge saga. The poem eventually replaced the lyrics to "Skippy the Wondermouse", a children's song that Trey wrote with his mother)
4. "Punch You in the Eye" (Tells the story of a sailor who passes through Gamehendge during Wilson's reign and his subsequent escape from Wilson's jail)
5. "Icculus" (Introduces the author of the Helping Friendly Book, a text which is revered by the Lizards)
6. "Harpua" (Tells the story of a mean bulldog who kills Poster Nutbag, a cat who belongs to a boy named Jimmy. The story is told differently each time and does not always take place in Gamehendge)
7. "Axilla" (A tale of monsters, witches, and battles in old time Gamehendge)
8. "Axilla, Part 2" (Told years later during peacetime in Gamehendge as the narrator reflects on the land's past turmoil)
9. "Kung" (A chant that one must perform in order to enter the land of Gamehendge)
10. "Esther" (Hails from Gamehendge and received her puppet from the owner of Harpua. The "flying jam" in Esther also appears as the interlude between several of the TMWSIY songs lending said songs a thematic, musical link.)
11. "Reba" (Jimmy's cousin who brews some very interesting recipes.)
12. "Split Open and Melt" (In the December 31, 2023 performance this song was used as an ending to Gamehendge in which it was pointed out that Icculus's mountain is actually an active volcano. The song depicts its eruption.)
13. "It's Ice" (Like Kung, this song was used as a "Gamehendge portal" in the March 22, 1993 performance in which the Ice was broken and on the other side was Gamehendge.)
14. "NO2" (Also used as a portal to Gamehendge on the July 8, 1994 performance.)
15. "The Landlady" (This instrumental is the slowed down Latin section adapted from "Punch You In the Eye")

== Characters from Gamehendge ==
1. The Lizards (People who inhabit the forest of Gamehendge and are dependent upon the writings of the Helping Friendly Book for their survival. Since losing the book to Wilson, they're a race of people practically extinct from doing things smart people don't do.)
2. Wilson (a traveller who arrives in Gamehendge and eventually captures the Helping Friendly Book from the Lizards and locks it in the top of his castle, thus becoming the sole dictator of Gamehendge)
3. Colonel Forbin (a retired colonel who helps the Lizards win back the Helping Friendly Book from the tower of Wilson's castle)
4. McGrupp (Colonel Forbin's dog)
5. Rutherford the Brave (An aging knight in gnarly armor who was once a Lizard and is part of the rebellion against Wilson)
6. Tela (A rebel who rides a multibeast. Forbin has a crush on her the moment he sees her but she is eventually killed for allegedly being a spy for Wilson)
7. Errand Woolfe (Lizard Leader of the rebellion against Wilson. Keeps the book for himself after overthrowing Wilson instead of returning it to the Lizards and declares himself the new king of Prussia. In the 12/31/23 performance the character is simply named "The Wolf" and is a human woman portrayed by Jo Lambert.)
8. Roger Woolfe (Errand's son. Hanged by Wilson in the public square on suspicion of treason.)
9. Mr. Palmer (Wilson's accountant who is hanged by the AC/DC Bag in the town square after he is caught embezzling money to fund the rebellion)
10. The AC/DC Bag (a robotic hangman with a bag on its head used to hang traitors and enemies of Wilson)
11. The Unit Monster (a giant hairy monster who serves as Tela's bodyguard. But he is killed along with her by Rutherford)
12. Spotted Stripers (Three-legged messenger birds allegedly used by Tela to send information to Wilson about the activities of the rebels)
13. Multibeasts (giant four-legged creatures with three heads and long necks. They are used as transportation by the people of Gamehendge, much like horses or camels. They have long curly hair and splotches of brown and white color.)
14. The Famous Mockingbird (a bird who is sent by Icculus to fly to the very top of Wilson's castle and retrieve the Helping Friendly Book for Colonel Forbin and the Lizards)
15. The Sloth (a hitman who is hired to murder Wilson after the Helping Friendly Book is rescued. In the original story, The Sloth succeeds and Errand Woolfe becomes king, but in the 12/31/23 performance, The Sloth is sent to kill Wilson before they get the Helping Friendly Book and the Sloth fails to assassinate Wilson because he's too slow.)
16. Icculus (The wise author of the Helping Friendly Book who lives atop the mountain in Gamehendge.)
17. Llamas (giant animals used by the Lizards in combat; complete with huge bazooka type guns on each side)
18. Jimmy (young resident of Gamehendge who owns a cat named Poster Nutbag)
19. Poster Nutbag (The cat owned by Jimmy; always dies some form of death towards the end of the song 'Harpua', an ever-changing narration sometimes taking place in Gamehendge)
20. Harpua (A mean bulldog owned by an old man who was banished from Jimmy's village; invariably ends up in a terrible fight with Poster Nutbag, usually resulting in Poster's death, sometimes set in Gamehendge.)
21. Armenian Man (A mean old butcher and the owner of Harpua)
22. Esther (Received a magical puppet from the Armenian Man that allowed her to fly but eventually dragged her under water into a tranquil and motionless sleep)
23. Reba (Jimmy's cousin, an eccentric cook with questionable recipes. She sells her creations to The Armenian Man)
24. Narrator (The story is usually narrated by Trey, but in the 12/31/23 performance, the narrator was Jimmy and Reba's Grandmother, portrayed by Annie Golden)

== Character and location references ==
1. In the story, "Prussia" is a city that was constructed in the land of Gamehendge. In the song "Wilson," Anastasio refers to Wilson as the "King of Prussia." This lyric references an actual city named King of Prussia, Pennsylvania, which is where "the rhombus" was rumored to be located. Actually located near Anastasio's childhood home in Princeton, New Jersey, the rhombus is a giant piece of art located in a field where Anastasio, Phish lyricist Tom Marshall, and other friends would engage in lengthy songwriting sessions (including some Gamehendge songs). "The Divided Sky" also references the rhombus, where the Lizards supposedly chant to the sky in praise of Icculus.
2. The Roger Holloway song "Mr. Richburg's Lullaby" also references more of Anastasio's friends, including Mike Christian, Holloway ("Roger Wolfe" in the story, also immortalized in "AC/DC Bag"), and drummer Pete Cottone. Anastasio and Holloway perform the instrumental duet "Aftermath" on the very first Phish album, which also features Pete Cottone on drums for "Slave to the Traffic Light."
3. Dave Abrahms, an old friend and songwriting collaborator of Anastasio's, is referenced in "McGrupp and the Watchful Hosemasters."

== Live performances ==
The songs from Gamehendge have been played many times throughout the career of Phish, sometimes with Anastasio narrating parts of the story to the audience. The earliest known performance of a Gamehendge song was "McGrupp and the Watchful Hosemasters" on April 6, 1985, in Burlington, Vermont. On the following occasions in the band's history, Phish performed a complete (or near complete) Gamehendge with narration. Each performance tells the story differently, with a different set of songs each time:

Date	Song List
March 12, 1988	McGrupp and the Watchful Hosemasters > The Lizards > Tela > Wilson > AC/DC Bag > Colonel Forbin's Ascent > Fly Famous Mockingbird > The Sloth > Possum
October 13, 1991	Wilson > Reba, The Landlady, Colonel Forbin's Ascent > Fly Famous Mockingbird > Tela > AC/DC Bag > The Sloth > McGrupp and the Watchful Hosemasters (Llama and It's Ice were performed later in the show)
March 22, 1993	It's Ice > The Lizards > Tela > Wilson > AC/DC Bag > Colonel Forbin's Ascent > Fly Famous Mockingbird > The Sloth > McGrupp and the Watchful Hosemasters (Reba was played earlier in the show)
June 26, 1994	Kung, Llama > The Lizards > Tela > Wilson > AC/DC Bag > Colonel Forbin's Ascent > Fly Famous Mockingbird > The Sloth > McGrupp and the Watchful Hosemasters > Divided Sky (Axilla Part II and Split Open and Melt were played later in the show)
July 8, 1994	Llama -> NO2 > The Lizards > Tela > Wilson > AC/DC Bag > Colonel Forbin's Ascent > Fly Famous Mockingbird > The Sloth > McGrupp and the Watchful Hosemasters > Divided Sky (Reba and It's Ice were performed later in the show)
December 31, 2023	Harpua > The Man Who Stepped Into Yesterday > The Lizards > Punch You in the Eye > AC/DC Bag > Tela > Llama > Wilson > The Sloth > Divided Sky, McGrupp and the Watchful Hosemasters > Colonel Forbin's Ascent > Fly Famous Mockingbird > Auld Lang Syne > Split Open and Melt (Reba was performed earlier in the show and Possum was performed later in the show).

Until December 31, 2023, the July 8, 1994 concert was the only complete Gamehendge performance to have been issued by the band as an official live release. It was first featured as part of their Dinner and a Movie webcast series in July 2020, and was made available on their LivePhish website the next month. The July 1994 concert had been recorded by Boston public television station WGBH.

The 1994 shows were recorded in 24-track digital for, it is assumed, a CD-ROM project that was mentioned in a 1994 Doniac Schvice. The project has long since been shelved.

Another common sequence at shows from 1988 to 1995, and less frequently after, was to play Colonel Forbin's Ascent segueing into Fly Famous Mockingbird, often with an Anastasio monologue sandwiched in between.

When songs from the project are performed live, accompanying narration often details the transportation of the audience to Gamehendge. Some fans speak of "going to Gamehendge" with reference to attending a Phish concert. Some songs and narratives explain how to get to Gamehendge, as evident in live versions of "Kung," "Harpua," "NO_{2}," and "It's Ice."

Phish performed the first complete Gamehendge cycle in 29 years during their New Year's Eve show at Madison Square Garden on December 31, 2023. The performance included all of the songs from The Man Who Stepped Into Yesterday with different narrations. In addition, there were many other associated Gamehendge songs that weren't on the original 1988 recording incorporated into the musical. The performance featured live actors, dancers and puppets portraying the characters from the songs. The song order and story was altered from the original TMWSIY. In this version Wilson is never killed and the story ends with a volcano eruption soon after The Famous Mockingbird retrieves the Helping Friendly Book. Despite the changes, this is the most complete version of Gamehendge to date and the narrator claims it is the "real" story.

== See also ==
- The Man Who Stepped Into Yesterday
