= Phish: New Year's Eve 1995 – Live at Madison Square Garden =

Live album by Phish
- Released: December 20, 2005; April 18, 2015 (Vinyl)
- Recorded: December 31, 1995
- Venues: Madison Square Garden, New York City
- Genres: Rock, jam
- Length: 216:54
- Labels: Rhino, JEMP
- Producer: Phish

Phish chronology
Undermind (2004)	Phish: New Year's Eve 1995 – Live at Madison Square Garden (2005)	Phish: Live in Brooklyn (2006)

Singles from Phish: New Year's Eve 1995 – Live at Madison Square Garden
- 1. "Strange Design" Released: 2005

Professional ratings
Review scores
Source	Rating
Allmusic	3.5/5 stars
Rolling Stone	4/5 stars
All About Jazz	4/5 stars

New Year's Eve 1995 - Live at Madison Square Garden is a live concert album by American rock band Phish that was released in 2005. The album comprises the band's December 31, 1995 show at Madison Square Garden, named by Rolling Stone as one of the "Greatest Concerts of the '90s".

Fans consider it one of Phish's best shows and the band considers it one of their top five concerts. Following this 1995 show, Phish established a tradition of performing multi-night New Year's shows at Madison Square Garden. The concert includes versions of two songs from The Who's Quadrophenia album, which Phish had covered in its entirety for their 1995 Halloween show, and songs from the band's Gamehendge song cycle.

The album was released on December 20, 2005, to celebrate the show's tenth anniversary and received the Archival Album of the Year award at the 6th Annual Jammy Awards in 2006. The release marked the first time that the song "The Sloth" had been issued on a commercially released Phish recording.

In addition to a CD, the album was released in FLAC and MP3 formats at LivePhish.com. Selected songs were also available in MPEG-4 video. On March 5, Phish announced that this would be released for Record Store Day 2015 as the band's first live vinyl box set.

== Track listing ==
=== Disc one ===
Set one
No.	Title	Writer(s)	Length
1.	"Punch You in the Eye"	Trey Anastasio	8:46
2.	"The Sloth →"	Anastasio; Tom Marshall	3:45
3.	"Reba"	Anastasio	14:25
4.	"The Squirming Coil →"	Anastasio; Marshall	10:27
5.	"Maze"	Anastasio; Marshall	10:18
6.	"Colonel Forbin's Ascent →"	Anastasio	5:22
7.	"Fly Famous Mockingbird"	Anastasio	2:14
8.	"Shine"	Ed Roland	1:13
9.	"Fly Famous Mockingbird →"	Anastasio	7:19
10.	"Sparkle →"	Anastasio; Marshall	3:46
11.	"Chalk Dust Torture"	Anastasio; Marshall	7:50

=== Disc two ===
Side two
No.	Title	Writer(s)	Length
1.	"Audience Chess Move"		1:32
2.	"Drowned →"	Pete Townshend	12:27
3.	"The Lizards"	Anastasio	10:37
4.	"Axilla (Part II) →"	Anastasio; Marshall	4:13
5.	"Runaway Jim"	Anastasio; Dave Abrahams	16:05
6.	"Strange Design"	Anastasio; Marshall	3:36
7.	"Hello My Baby"	Ida Emerson; Joseph E. Howard	1:27
8.	"Mike's Song"	Mike Gordon	20:31

=== Disc three ===
Set three
No.	Title	Writer(s)	Length
1.	"Gamehendge Time Phactory →"	Anastasio; Jon Fishman; Gordon; Page McConnell	5:03
2.	"Auld Lang Syne →"	Traditional	1:44
3.	"Weekapaug Groove →"	Anastasio; Fishman; Gordon; McConnell	17:42
4.	"Sea and Sand"	Townshend	3:46
5.	"You Enjoy Myself"	Anastasio	25:37
6.	"Sanity"	Anastasio; Fishman; Gordon; McConnell; Steve Pollak	6:08
7.	"Frankenstein"	Edgar Winter	5:47

Encore
No.	Title	Writer(s)	Length
8.	"Johnny B. Goode"	Chuck Berry	4:59

== Personnel ==
Phish

Trey Anastasio - guitars, percussion on "Runaway Jim", lead vocals, acapella vocals on "Hello My Baby"
Page McConnell - keyboards, backing vocals, lead vocals on "Strange Design" and "Sea and Sand", acapella vocals on "Hello My Baby"
Mike Gordon - bass guitar, backing vocals, lead vocals on "Drowned" and "Mike's Song", acapella vocals on "Hello My Baby"
Jon Fishman - drums, backing vocals, acapella vocals on "Hello My Baby"

Additional musicians

- Tom Marshall - lead vocals on "Shine"
