= A Live One =

Live album by Phish
- Released: June 27, 1995
- Recorded: July 8 – December 31, 1994
- Genre: Jam rock, jazz fusion
- Length: 131:04
- Label: Elektra
- Producer: Phish

Phish chronology
Hoist (1994)	A Live One (1995)	Stash (1996)

Singles from A Live One
- 1. "Bouncing Around the Room" Released: 1995; 2. "Gumbo" Released: 1995

Professional ratings
Review scores
Source	Rating
AllMusic	4.5/5 stars
Encyclopedia of Popular Music	4/5 stars
Entertainment Weekly	B+
Los Angeles Times	2/4 stars
Rolling Stone	3/5 stars
The Rolling Stone Album Guide	4/5 stars
The Village Voice	C+

A Live One is a live album by the American rock band Phish, released on June 27, 1995, by Elektra Records. The album was the band's first official live release, their first album to be certified Platinum by the Recording Industry Association of America and one of the best-selling releases in their catalog.

== Background and contents ==
Although tapes of concerts recorded from the audience had been distributed among Phish's fanbase for several years by the time of A Live One's release, the album marked the first time that the band had officially released live recordings directly from their soundboard masters. The album was named after a question that the band members were often asked by fans: "When are you gonna put out a live one?"

Each track on the album was recorded at a different live show in the United States with one track taken from the 1994 summer tour and the rest from the fall tour. Although recorded at different venues, the songs are noted in the liner notes as having been recorded at "The Clifford Ball", a reference to aviator Clifford Ball that the band would use again as the name of their 1996 festival. This decision was made because the band's management could not secure the recording rights from every venue featured on the album at the time of its release.

Five of the songs—"Gumbo", "Slave to the Traffic Light", "Wilson", "Simple" and "Harry Hood"—had never appeared on any of Phish's studio albums, but all of them were regularly performed by the band in concert. A Live One marked the first time all five had appeared on an official Phish release. Of those songs, only "Slave to the Traffic Light" would subsequently be released in a studio version, when a recording of the song from 1986 appeared on the 1998 Elektra reissue of the band's demo release The White Tape. The track "Montana" is a two-minute excerpt from the longform improvisation that followed "Tweezer" during the band's show in Bozeman, Montana. On A Live One, "Montana" serves as a prelude to the epic "You Enjoy Myself", one of the best-known versions of that song.

Two of the concerts that were excerpted on A Live One were later issued in their entirety by Phish: July 8, 1994 (featuring the A Live One version of "Stash") and November 28, 1994 (which is the source of the aforementioned "Montana").

== Tracklist selection ==
The track-listing for A Live One was selected by the four members of Phish, each of whom reviewed the concert tapes from their 1994 fall tour and drafted a list of personal favorite performances. The band then compiled a master list of 560 song performances that had received mention by at least two of the members, which was further narrowed down to a shortlist of 30 songs, from which the final tracklist was selected.

In addition to utilizing their own selections, Phish involved their fanbase in the compilation of the album. The band posted an official thread on the rec.music.phish Usenet newsgroup, in which the message board's users were encouraged to suggest performances they believed should be included. The July 8, 1994, version of "Stash" was brought to the band's attention through the thread, and was ultimately chosen for inclusion on the album.

== Sales ==
In July 1995, A Live One peaked at number 18 on the Billboard 200 album chart in the United States, and was their first album to reach the chart's Top 20. The album sold nearly 50,000 copies in its first week on sale. "Bouncing Around the Room" and "Gumbo" were both issued as singles, but neither appeared on a Billboard chart.

Phish received its first Recording Industry Association of America (RIAA) award for the album. The RIAA certified the album gold on November 10, 1995, for sales of 500,000 copies, and platinum on October 9, 1997, for sales of over 1 million copies.

== Track listing ==
Disc one
No.	Title	Writer(s)	Recording date and venue	Length
1.	"Bouncing Around the Room"	Trey Anastasio; Tom Marshall	December 31, 1994 – Boston Garden (Boston, MA)	4:08
2.	"Stash"	Anastasio; Marshall	July 8, 1994 – Great Woods Center for the Performing Arts (Mansfield, MA)	12:31
3.	"Gumbo"	Anastasio; Jon Fishman	December 2, 1994 – Recreation Hall, University of California, Davis (Davis, CA)	5:14
4.	"Montana"	Anastasio; Fishman; Mike Gordon; Page McConnell	November 28, 1994 – Brick Breeden Fieldhouse, Montana State University (Bozeman, MT)	2:04
5.	"You Enjoy Myself"	Anastasio	December 7, 1994 – Spreckels Theater Building (San Diego, CA)	20:57
6.	"Chalk Dust Torture"	Anastasio; Marshall	November 16, 1994 – Hill Auditorium, University of Michigan (Ann Arbor, MI)	6:48
7.	"Slave to the Traffic Light"	Anastasio; Dave Abrahams; Steve Pollak	November 26, 1994 – Orpheum Theatre (Minneapolis, MN)	10:46

Disc two
No.	Title	Writer(s)	Recording date and venue	Length
1.	"Wilson"	Anastasio; Marshall; Aaron Woolf	December 30, 1994 – Madison Square Garden (New York, NY)	5:07
2.	"Tweezer"	Anastasio; Fishman; Gordon; McConnell	November 2, 1994 – Bangor Auditorium (Bangor, ME)	30:55
3.	"Simple"	Gordon	December 10, 1994 – Santa Monica Civic Auditorium (Santa Monica, CA)	4:53
4.	"Harry Hood"	Anastasio; Fishman; Gordon; McConnell; Brian Long	October 23, 1994 – Gator Bandshell, University of Florida (Gainesville, FL)	15:11
5.	"The Squirming Coil"	Anastasio; Marshall	October 9, 1994 – A. J. Palumbo Center (Pittsburgh, PA); October 23, 1994 – Gator Bandshell, University of Florida (Gainesville, FL)	12:30
Total length:				131:04

== Personnel ==
Phish

- Trey Anastasio – guitars, vocals
- Page McConnell – keyboards, vocals
- Mike Gordon – bass guitar, vocals
- Jon Fishman – drums, vocals

with The Giant Country Horns (on "Gumbo")

- Peter Apfelbaum – tenor saxophone
- Carl Gerhard – trumpet
- Dave Grippo – alto saxophone
- James Harvey – trombone
- Michael Ray – trumpet
