= Phish (disambiguation) =

Phish, or phishing, may refer to:

== Music, arts, & entertainment ==
- Phish, an American rock band
- Phish (album), a demo album released by the American rock band Phish

== Other uses ==
- Phishing, a form of Internet deception
