= Julius (song) =

- Cover of promo single

Single by Phish

from the album Hoist
- Released: 1994
- Recorded: October–November 1993, American Recording Co., Woodland Hills, California
- Genre: Rock, blues rock
- Length: 3:43
- Label: Elektra PRCD 9012-2
- Songwriters: Trey Anastasio, Tom Marshall
- Producer: Paul Fox

Phish singles chronology
"Sample in a Jar" (1994)	"Julius" (1994)	"Bouncing Around the Room" (1995)

"Julius" is a 1994 song by the American band Phish. It is the first track from their 1994 album Hoist and was released as their seventh promotional single by Elektra Records. The song is a blues rock song written by Phish guitarist and lead vocalist Trey Anastasio and lyricist Tom Marshall. The song features backing vocals by Rose Stone, Jean McClain and the Rickey Grundy Chorale and horn instruments by the Tower of Power Horn Section.

The song's lyrics are based on the assassination of Julius Caesar and William Shakespeare's play Julius Caesar.

== Track listing ==
1. "Julius" (Edit) (Trey Anastasio, Tom Marshall) - 3:43

== Personnel ==
Musicians

Trey Anastasio – guitars, vocals
Page McConnell – keyboards, vocals
Mike Gordon – bass guitar, vocals
Jon Fishman – drums, vocals

== Also appears on ==
- Live Phish Volume 13 (2002)
- It (DVD) (2004)
- Vegas 96 (2007)
- Coral Sky (DVD) (2010)
- Hampton/Winston-Salem '97 (2011)
- Chicago '94 (2012)
- Star Lake 98 (DVD) (2012)
- Niagara Falls (2013)
- The Gorge '98 (2022)
