= Down with Disease =

- Cover of promo single

Single by Phish

from the album Hoist
- B-side: "NO2" (cassette single only)
- Released: 1994
- Recorded: October–November 1993, American Recording Co., Woodland Hills, California
- Genre: Rock, funk rock
- Length: 4:13
- Label: Elektra PRCD 8915-2
- Songwriters: Trey Anastasio, Tom Marshall
- Producer: Paul Fox

Phish singles chronology
"The Wedge" (1993)	"Down with Disease" (1994)	"Sample in a Jar" (1994)

"Down with Disease" is a 1994 song by American band Phish. It is the second track from their 1994 album Hoist and was released as their fifth promotional single by Elektra Records. The song is a funk rock song written by Phish guitarist and lead vocalist Trey Anastasio and lyricist Tom Marshall. The song's lyrics were based on a bout with infectious mononucleosis suffered by Marshall.

"Down with Disease" was Phish's breakthrough single on American rock radio, reaching #33 on the Billboard Mainstream Rock Tracks chart in June 1994. It was first played live December 31, 1993, as a jam without lyrics. "Down with Disease" was released as a single by Elektra on both CD and cassette. The compact disc version of the single was a promotional item issued to radio stations, while the cassette edition was issued to retail. The CD only includes "Down with Disease", while the cassette also contains "NO2", an experimental musique concrète composition that features dental drill sound effects. A different recording of "NO2" appeared on the band's 1986 demo release The White Tape.

In concert, "Down With Disease" has spanned from three, to ten, to over twenty minutes, often featuring full band improvisation. The longest standalone rendition of this song was the April 21, 2024 performance, which clocked in at 33 minutes and 56 seconds.

== Music video ==
A music video was created for the song, directed by Phish bassist Mike Gordon, that showed the members of the band scuba diving through an aquarium. The video was partially shot during the song's debut live performance, at the band's December 31, 1993 New Year's Eve concert at the Worcester Centrum in Worcester, Massachusetts. During the performance, the stage was decorated with aquarium props for the music video shoot. The video appeared a few times on MTV, including an abbreviated version on Beavis and Butt-head.

The "Down with Disease" music video is the only one that has been produced by the band during its 40-year career, apart from a semi-official 1991 fan-made video for the song "Esther".

== Track listing ==
1. "Down with Disease" (LP Version) (Trey Anastasio, Tom Marshall) - 4:13
2. "NO_{2}" (Previously Unreleased Track) (Mike Gordon) - 8:14

== Personnel ==
Musicians

Trey Anastasio – guitars, vocals
Page McConnell – keyboards, vocals
Mike Gordon – bass guitar, vocals
Jon Fishman – drums, vocals

== Charts ==
Chart (1994)	Peak position
U.S. Mainstream Rock Tracks (Billboard)	33
U.S. Alternative (Radio & Records)	35
U.S. Album-Oriented Rock (Radio & Records)	25

== Also appears on ==
- Stash (1996)
- Bittersweet Motel (DVD) (2001)
- Live Phish Volume 2 (2001)
- Live Phish Volume 11 (2002)
- Live Phish Volume 15 (2002)
- Live Phish 04.05.98 (2005)
- Vegas 96 (2007)
- Walnut Creek (DVD) (2008)
- At the Roxy (2008)
- The Clifford Ball (DVD) (2009)
- Alpine Valley (DVD) (2010)
- Hampton/Winston-Salem '97 (2011)
- Chicago '94 (2012)
- Star Lake 98 (DVD) (2012)
- Amsterdam (2015)
- The Spectrum '97 (2024)
