= Undermind =

Undermind may refer to:

- Undermind (album), a 2004 album by Phish
- Undermind (film), a 2003 U.S. film
- Undermind (TV series), a 1965 UK science fiction television drama
