= Tracking (film) =

- Directed by: Mike Gordon
- Starring: Phish
- Release date: 1994
- Running time: 25 mins

Tracking (1994) is a documentary about the band Phish and the recording of the album Hoist. It is directed by the band's bass player, Mike Gordon, who wrote, for the VHS packaging:

While in the studio recording the album 'Hoister' (sic) I sported a video camera. Sometimes I pushed the record button. Others, the stop. Alas, I edited. Using machines small yet sweet, I assembled Tracking. This isn't about railroad tracks or stuffing things up the tender nostril. It's about 48 tracks of sound, adjacent on strips of plastic. Like mixing lilac petals, coriander, chunks of butter, and fennel into a soup. Tracking is the recording of different sounds, adjacent on strips of plastic. . . .

Many of the musicians on the album, Alison Krauss, Béla Fleck, and actor Jonathan Frakes, are shown recording tracks that eventually wound up on the album. The documentary is approximately 25 minutes long and was produced by Cactus Films.

== Personnel ==
Phish

Trey Anastasio - guitars, vocals
Page McConnell - keyboards, vocals
Mike Gordon - bass, vocals
Jon Fishman - drums, vocals
