= The Wedge (song) =

Single by Phish

from the album Rift
- Released: 1993
- Recorded: September–October 1992, White Crow Studios, Burlington, Vermont and October–November 1992, The Castle, Nashville, Tennessee
- Genre: Rock, jazz fusion
- Length: 4:07
- Label: Elektra PRCD 8768-2
- Songwriter(s): Trey Anastasio, Tom Marshall
- Producer(s): Barry Beckett

Phish singles chronology
"Fast Enough for You" (1993)	"The Wedge" (1993)	"Down with Disease" (1994)

"The Wedge" is a 1993 song by the American band Phish. It is the seventh track from their 1993 concept album Rift and was released as their fourth promotional single by Elektra Records. The song is a mid-tempo jazz fusion tune written by Phish guitarist and lead vocalist Trey Anastasio and lyricist Tom Marshall.

With a catchy sing-along chorus (which, in The Phish Book, Tom noted was inspired by Neil Young’s “Thrasher”) punctuated by an infectious beat and featuring some wonderful bass bombs, “The Wedge” was a longtime resident in a select group of songs: always requested but rarely played. Following its 1993 debut it roared out of the gates, but was on the shelf by the end of summer and was bypassed entirely in 1994. After its breakout in the summer of 1995 “The Wedge” was only played once in 1996 and twice in 1997 before coming back to rotation in 1998.

== Track listing ==
1. "The Wedge" (Trey Anastasio, Tom Marshall) - 4:07

== Personnel ==
Musicians

Trey Anastasio – guitars, vocals
Page McConnell – keyboards, vocals
Mike Gordon – bass guitar, vocals
Jon Fishman – drums, vocals

== Also appears on ==
- Hampton Comes Alive (1999)
