= Sample in a Jar =

Single by Phish

from the album Hoist
- Released: 1994
- Recorded: October–November 1993, American Recording Co., Woodland Hills, California
- Genre: Rock
- Length: 4:38
- Label: Elektra PRCD 8989-2
- Songwriters: Trey Anastasio, Tom Marshall
- Producer: Paul Fox

Phish singles chronology
"Down with Disease" (1994)	"Sample in a Jar" (1994)	"Julius" (1994)

"Sample in a Jar" is a song by the American band Phish. It was released as the second single from the band's fifth studio album, Hoist. The song peaked at No. 49 on the Radio & Records Rock chart.

On the surface, the lyrics seem to deal with a relationship argument while intoxicated. In The Phish Book, Trey mentioned that the song is “basically about sitting in a car with the seatbelt on, drunk.”

== Covers ==
The song was covered by the band Little Feat on the album Chinese Work Songs.

== Personnel ==
Musicians

Trey Anastasio – guitars, vocals
Page McConnell – keyboards, vocals
Mike Gordon – bass guitar, vocals
Jon Fishman – drums, vocals

== Also appears on ==
- Stash (1996)
- Live Phish Volume 2 (2001)
- Live Phish Volume 3 (2002)
- Live Phish Volume 10 (2002)
- Live Phish Volume 18 (2003)
- Live In Brooklyn (CD/DVD) (2006)
- The Clifford Ball (DVD) (2009)
- Chicago '94 (2012)
- Star Lake 98 (DVD) (2012)
- The Gorge '98 (2022)
- The Spectrum '97 (2024)
