= Specimens of Beauty =

- Directed by: Danny Clinch
- Starring: Phish
- Release date: June 15, 2004
- Running time: 26 min

Specimens of Beauty is a 26-minute documentary about the rock band Phish recording their 2004 album Undermind. Directed by famed photographer Danny Clinch, the film shows the techniques used by the band and album producer Tchad Blake, as Phish records what was to be their final album.

Recorded at Trey Anastasio's recording studio, The Barn, outside Burlington, Vermont, the documentary features Phish in numerous takes of the Undermind track "Crowd Control."

Specimens of Beauty was included with early copies of Undermind on a bonus DVD.

== Personnel ==
- Trey Anastasio - guitars, vocals
- Page McConnell - keyboards, vocals
- Mike Gordon - bass, vocals
- Jon Fishman - drums, vocals
