= Undermind (album) =

Studio album by Phish
- Released: June 15, 2004
- Recorded: May 2002, The Barn (Vermont), April 2003, Nantucket, Massachusetts, June 2003, Big Moe Recording, Chicago, Illinois, February 2004, The Barn (Vermont), March 2004, Cactus Unlimited, New York and Vermont
- Genre: Rock
- Length: 50:30
- Label: Elektra
- Producer: Tchad Blake

Phish chronology
The Victor Disc (2002)	Undermind (2004)	New Year's Eve 1995 (2005)

Singles from Undermind
- 1. "The Connection" Released: 2004

Professional ratings
Review scores
Source	Rating
Allmusic	3.5/5 stars
Rolling Stone	(favorable)

Undermind is the eleventh studio album by American rock band Phish, released on June 15, 2004 by Elektra Records. The album was the group's last release before they disbanded in August 2004. It is also their final studio release for Elektra Records (or a major record label for that matter); When the band reunited in 2009, their subsequent albums would be released through their own JEMP Records label which had launched in December 2005 for live releases.

== Contents ==
The album's cover art appears to be a direct nod to Let It Be, the final studio album by The Beatles. In a review of Undermind, Glide Magazine suggests that the album's individual song contributions may also be intentionally "Beatles-esque". While the bulk of the songs are by frontman Trey Anastasio and Phish lyricist Tom Marshall, keyboard player Page McConnell, bass guitarist Mike Gordon and drummer Jon Fishman all contributed one song each. "Maggie's Revenge" is the album's only instrumental.

The introductory passage of "Scents and Subtle Sounds", which opens the album, is taken from a demo recorded by Phish frontman Trey Anastasio and the band's primary lyricist Tom Marshall. The track marks Marshall's first vocal contribution to a Phish album. In concert, this intro is regularly performed as the first verse of the main "Scents and Subtle Sounds".

Early copies of the album included a DVD with the 25 minute documentary Specimens of Beauty, a behind-the-scenes film on the making of Undermind, directed by Danny Clinch.

An extended improvisational studio jam recorded at the start of the Undermind sessions was later released as the Headphones Jam at LivePhish.com. Two excerpts from the Headphones Jam were used for the Undermind album: "Maggie's Revenge" and "Tiny" (an internet-only bonus track).

== Reception and legacy ==
Many reviews praised "The Connection", calling it "the most commanding" and "most commercially accessible" song of Phish's recording career to date. The song never became a regular fixture in the band's live rotation, and has only been performed six times as of 2024.

One month before the album's release, Anastasio (and separately, McConnell) announced on Phish.com that the band would split following their summer tour. As such, a number of the songs were not performed live before the break up, though most have been played since the band's return in 2009, with "Scents and Subtle Sounds", the title track and "A Song I Heard the Ocean Sing" ultimately entering the band's setlist rotation. Undermind's songs remain among the least played originals in Phish's large catalog.

In February 2009, Undermind was made available as a download in FLAC and MP3 formats at LivePhish.com.

== Track listing ==
Undermind
No.	Title	Writer(s)	Lead vocals	Length
1.	"Scents and Subtle Sounds (Intro)"	Trey Anastasio; Tom Marshall; Scott Herman	Anastasio	1:37
2.	"Undermind"	Anastasio; Marshall; Herman	Anastasio	4:57
3.	"The Connection"	Anastasio; Marshall	Anastasio	2:22
4.	"A Song I Heard the Ocean Sing"	Anastasio; Marshall	Anastasio	6:20
5.	"Army of One"	Page McConnell	McConnell	5:01
6.	"Crowd Control"	Anastasio; Marshall	Anastasio	3:34
7.	"Maggie's Revenge"	Anastasio; Jon Fishman; Mike Gordon; McConnell	instrumental	1:43
8.	"Nothing"	Anastasio; Marshall	Anastasio; Gordon; McConnell	4:06
9.	"Two Versions of Me"	Anastasio; Marshall	Anastasio	3:45
10.	"Access Me"	Gordon	Gordon	2:38
11.	"Scents and Subtle Sounds"	Anastasio; Marshall; Herman	Anastasio	5:05
12.	"Tomorrow's Song"	Fishman	Anastasio; Fishman; Gordon; McConnell	1:51
13.	"Secret Smile"	Anastasio; Marshall	Anastasio; McConnell	6:31
14.	"Grind"	Anastasio; Marshall	Anastasio; Fishman; Gordon; McConnell	0:59
Total length:				50:30

== Personnel ==
Phish

- Trey Anastasio – guitars, lead vocals, engineer
- Page McConnell – keyboards, backing vocals, lead vocals on "Army of One" and "Grind"
- Mike Gordon – bass guitar, backing vocals, lead vocals on "Access Me" and "Grind"
- Jon Fishman – drums, backing vocals, lead vocals on "Grind"

Other musicians:

- Tom Marshall – backing vocals on "Scents and Subtle Sounds (Intro)"

String section on "Secret Smile"

- Violin: Katherine Winterstein, Laura Markowitz, Signy Glendinning, Sofia Hirsch, Ann Cooper, Kathy Andrew
- Viola: Roy Feldman, Pam Reit, Hilary Hatch
- Cello: John Dunlop, Dieuwke Davydov; arrangement: Maria Schneider

Production:

- Tchad Blake – producer, engineer, mixing, photography
- Peter J. Carini – assistant engineer
- Danny Clinch – photography
- Bryce Goggin – engineer
- JDK – design
- Claire Lewis – mixing assistant
- Bob Ludwig – mastering
- Bill Plummer – engineer
- Maria Schneider – arranger
- Jared Slomoff – engineer
- Chris Weal – assistant engineer
- Brian Brown – production assistant, technical assistance
- Kevin Brown – production assistant, technical assistance
- Kevin Shapiro – production assistant, technical assistance
- Pam Reit – production assistant, technical assistance
- Kevin Monty – production assistant, technical assistance
- Rob O'Dea – production assistant, technical assistance
- Paul Languedoc – production assistant, technical assistance
