= JEMP Records =

American record label

- Logo of JEMP Records
- Founded: 2005
- Founder: Trey Anastasio; Jon Fishman; Mike Gordon; Page McConnell
- Distributor: Alternative Distribution Alliance (In the US)
- Genre: Phish
- Country of origin: US
- Official website: Official Web site of JEMP Records

JEMP Records is a record label that was created at the beginning of 2005 by Phish Inc. in Burlington, Vermont, specializing in releases from the band Phish.

On December 20, 2005, the label's first release was a 3-CD recording of Phish's performance on December 31, 1995 at Madison Square Garden in New York, New York called New Year's Eve 1995 - Live at Madison Square Garden.

The second JEMP Records title was a DVD entitled Live in Brooklyn, which was released on July 11, 2006 in conjunction with Rhino Entertainment (an accompanying soundtrack CD was also released).

On October 31, 2006, Phish released Colorado '88, a 3-CD compilation, and Vegas 96, a Limited Edition Boxed CD set recorded live at the Aladdin Theatre in Las Vegas, Nevada, was released on November 20, 2007. The fifth release was a 2-DVD set entitled Walnut Creek, which was recorded live on July 22, 1997, and was released August 5, 2008.

JEMP Records released the 8-CD box set At the Roxy, which was recorded from February 19 to February 21, 1993, on November 19, 2008.

On March 3, 2009, JEMP Records released The Clifford Ball, a seven-DVD box set chronicling the festival that took place from August 16 to August 17, 1996 at the Plattsburgh Air Force Base in Plattsburgh, NY.

On June 24, 2009, JEMP Records announced it would release Joy, the first new Phish studio album in five years and the first non-archival release from the label. The label continued releasing the band's next four studio albums, Fuego (2014), Big Boat (2016), Sigma Oasis (2020), and Evolve (2024).

J.E.M.P. is an acronym for the first names of the members of Phish: Jon, Ernest, Mike, and Page.

== Vinyl JEMP Records Releases ==
JEMP also officially licenses Phish releases from Warner Music Group (formerly Elektra Records, the band's original label). They include the following.

- Junta (1989)
- Lawn Boy (1990)
- A Picture of Nectar (1992)
- Rift (1993)
- Hoist (1994)
- New Year's Eve 1995 - Live at Madison Square Garden (December 20, 2005)
- Billy Breathes (1996)
- The Story of the Ghost (1998)
- The Siket Disc (1999)

Phish vinyl releases that were put out by JEMP Records without any licensing.

- Phish (1986)
- Joy (2009)
- Fuego (2014)
- Big Boat (2016)
- Sigma Oasis (2020)
- Evolve (2024)

== Official JEMP Records Releases ==
- New Year's Eve 1995 - Live at Madison Square Garden (December 20, 2005)
- Live in Brooklyn (July 11, 2006)
- Colorado '88 (October 31, 2006)
- Vegas 96 (November 20, 2007)
- Walnut Creek (August 5, 2008)
- At the Roxy (November 18, 2008)
- The Clifford Ball (March 3, 2009)
- Joy (September 8, 2009)
- Live In Utica DVD (May 17, 2010)
- Alpine Valley 2010 DVD (December 17, 2010)
- Hampton/Winston-Salem '97 (December 6, 2011)
- Chicago '94 (July 31, 2012)
- Star Lake 98 (December 11, 2012)
- Ventura (June 18, 2013)
- Fuego (June 24, 2014)
- New Year's Eve 1995 - Live At Madison Square Garden (April 18, 2015)
- Amsterdam (June 16, 2015)
- Rift (special release for Magnaball 8-21-15)
- Big Boat (October 7, 2016)
- Kasvot Växt: í rokk (November 9, 2018)
- Sigma Oasis (April 2, 2020)
- LP on LP 01 (June 18, 2021)
- LP on LP 02 (June 18, 2021)
- LP on LP 03 (August 15, 2022)
- Get More Down as Sci-Fi Soldier (October 31, 2022)
- The Gorge '98 (December 9, 2022)
- LP on LP 04 (January 13, 2023)
- The Spectrum '97 (March 15, 2024)
- LP on LP 05 (February 7, 2025)
- LP on LP 06 (February 7, 2025)
- New Year’s Eve 1993, Live At Worcester Centrum (February 20, 2026)

== See also ==
- Alternative Distribution Alliance
- Elektra Records - Phish's former main label
- Phish
