= Marc Daubert =

American drummer

- Also known as: Marco Esquandolas
- Born: January 13, 1963 (age 63); Princeton, New Jersey, United States
- Genres: Psychedelic rock, rock, jam rock
- Occupation: Musician
- Instruments: Percussion, guitar, vocals
- Years active: 1981–present

Marc Daubert (born January 13, 1963) is an American musician. He collaborated with Phish for a brief time in their early history.

Daubert was a close friend of guitarist Trey Anastasio. Anastasio, Daubert, and lyricist/keyboardist Tom Marshall recorded a project entitled Bivouac Jaun. Much of this recording would end up on Phish's debut album, known as The White Tape.

When Anastasio returned to UVM in September 1984, he brought Daubert along. The most circulated Phish tape featuring Daubert is from a performance on December 1, 1984, at the club Nectar's in downtown Burlington, Vermont. After a run of shows in February 1985 at a club called Doolin's, Daubert quit the band.

Daubert also penned the lyrics to the Phish song "The Curtain," which was first performed live by Phish in 1987, over two years after Daubert's departure from the band.

Daubert is listed in the album credits on the CD "Lawn Boy" (Elektra Records 1990). He continues to write, produce and copyright music under his own music label Marc Daubert Music.

== Discography ==
1. Parlor Tricks (2006) 2). http://blaqfather.bandcamp.com/ 3). { Time Travel Music Genre } References : http://blaqfather.bandcamp.com/track/tanx http://blaqfather.bandcamp.com/track/signals http://blaqfather.bandcamp.com/track/whisper
