= Hoist (album) =

Studio album by Phish
- Released: March 29, 1994
- Recorded: October–November 1993
- Studio: American Recording Co. (Woodland Hills, California)
- Genre: Rock
- Length: 50:28
- Label: Elektra
- Producer: Paul Fox

Phish chronology
Rift (1993)	Hoist (1994)	A Live One (1995)

Singles from Hoist
- 1. "Down with Disease" Released: March 29, 1994; 2. "Sample in a Jar" Released: 1994; 3. "Julius" Released: 1994

Professional ratings
Review scores
Source	Rating
AllMusic	3/5 stars
Chicago Tribune	3/4 stars
The Encyclopedia of Popular Music	3/5 stars
Entertainment Weekly	C+
Los Angeles Times	2/4 stars
The Village Voice	(dud)

Hoist (stylized as (HOIST)) is the fifth studio album by the American rock band Phish, released on March 29, 1994, by Elektra Records. At the time of its release, Hoist was Phish's best selling album to date, peaking at No. 34 on the Billboard 200 albums chart. The album was certified gold by the RIAA on August 19, 1996, and remains the band's best-selling studio release, outsold in their discography only by the platinum-certified A Live One.

The album includes "Down with Disease", the band's breakthrough single on American rock radio, reaching the top 40 of Billboard magazine's Mainstream Rock Tracks chart in June 1994. The band filmed their only official music video for the song, directed by bassist Mike Gordon, which received some airplay on MTV.

== Title ==
The band suggested a few ideas for the album's title before finally settling on Hoist; one of the alternative suggestions was Hung Like a Horse. The band ruled this out, but decided to keep the visual joke intact for the album's cover. The horse is also a reference to "The Horse," the only song not visually depicted on the cover of Rift, the band's previous album. The horse on the cover is named Maggie and was owned by the band's friend Amy Skelton.

== Production ==
Most of the songs on Hoist were not played in concert by Phish until after the release of the album. Only "Sample in a Jar" and "Lifeboy" had been played beforehand, both debuting in 1993. "Axilla (Part II)" is a version of the song "Axilla", which had been debuted in 1992, with new lyrics. Although the band played "Part II" throughout 1994, Phish retired the song in favor of the original version of "Axilla" in 1995. After 1995, Phish did not perform "Part II" again until September 2021. The outro jam segment of "Down with Disease" had been debuted by the band at midnight at their New Year's Eve 1993–94 concert, but the entire song was not played live until April 1994.

Hoist features guest appearances from Alison Krauss, Béla Fleck, Tower of Power, Rose Stone and a host of other musicians, as well as actor Jonathan Frakes on trombone. With its jazz, blues, soul and bluegrass influences, the album is marked by more stripped-down, straightforward songwriting and pop-friendly hooks, a somewhat new approach for Phish.

However, the album's final track, "Demand", segues into an extended eight-minute instrumental excerpt from a live performance of the song "Split Open and Melt" from the band's April 21, 1993, concert at the Newport Music Hall in Columbus, Ohio. The "Split" jam is then abruptly cut off by the sound of a car crash followed by the first verse and refrain of the Hebrew song "Yerushalayim Shel Zahav (Jerusalem of Gold)."

"Riker's Mailbox" is a brief interlude track on the album, and the only "song" on the album to have never been performed live by the band. Album producer Paul Fox lived next to Jonathan Frakes, whose mailbox is apparently uniquely decorated. Frakes, who played Commander Riker on Star Trek: The Next Generation, sat in for a while during the Hoist sessions, giving his name to the track. The "Riker's Mailbox" track is extracted from a longer take of the song "Buffalo Bill", which had been recorded during the Hoist sessions but did not make the album's track list.

On June 26, 1994, the band performed the entire Hoist album (minus "Riker's Mailbox" but including the "Split Open and Melt" jam) verbatim as the second set of their live show in Charleston, West Virginia. The first set of the concert had featured the band performing their "Gamehendge" song suite in its entirety, and as a result, the concert is known by fans as the "GameHoist" show. This move was a subversion of Phish's usual improvisationally driven performances, and the concert later inspired the band's tradition of donning a musical costume for Halloween.

In February 2009, this album became available as a download in FLAC and MP3 formats at LivePhish.com.

== Track listing ==
No.	Title	Writer(s)	Lead vocals	Length
1.	"Julius"	Trey Anastasio; Tom Marshall	Anastasio with the Rickey Grundy Chorale	4:42
2.	"Down with Disease"	Anastasio; Marshall	Anastasio	4:07
3.	"If I Could"	Anastasio	Anastasio with Alison Krauss	4:09
4.	"Riker's Mailbox"	Anastasio; Jon Fishman; Mike Gordon; Page McConnell	instrumental	0:26
5.	"Axilla (Part II)"	Anastasio; Marshall	Anastasio	4:28
6.	"Lifeboy"	Anastasio; Marshall	Anastasio	6:54
7.	"Sample in a Jar"	Anastasio; Marshall	Anastasio	4:41
8.	"Wolfman's Brother"	Anastasio; Fishman; Gordon; McConnell; Marshall	Anastasio	4:28
9.	"Scent of a Mule"	Gordon	Gordon	4:02
10.	"Dog Faced Boy"	Anastasio; Fishman; McConnell; Marshall	Anastasio	2:11
11.	"Demand" "Split Open and Melt" Jam – April 21, 1993 "Yerushalayim Shel Zahav"	Anastasio; Marshall; Anastasio; Naomi Shemer	Anastasio; Gordon; McConnell; instrumental; Anastasio; Fishman; Gordon; McConnell	10:42
Total length:				50:28

== Personnel ==
Phish

- Trey Anastasio – guitars, lead vocals
- Page McConnell – pianos, organ, backing vocals
- Mike Gordon – electric and upright basses, mandolin, backing vocals, lead vocals on "Scent of a Mule"
- Jon "Greasy Fizeek" Fishman – drums, backing vocals

Additional musicians

- Morgan Fichter – violin on "Lifeboy"
- Alison Krauss – additional vocals on "If I Could"
- Rickey Grundy Chorale – backing vocals on "Julius"
  - Rickey Grundy – Conductor
  - Trelawney McLaurin
  - Beverly Witherspoon
  - Theodore Trent III
  - Beretta Thomas
  - Angela Brown
  - Hosea Belcher
- Rose Stone & Jean McClain – backing vocals on "Julius", "Down With Disease" and "Wolfman's Brother"
- Tower of Power Horn Section – horns on "Julius" and "Wolfman's Brother"
  - Greg Adams – fluegelhorn
  - Lee Thornburg – trumpet, trombone
  - Stephen "Doc" Kupka – baritone saxophone
  - David Mann – alto saxophone
  - Emilio Castillo – tenor saxophone
- Jonathan Frakes – trombone on "Riker's Mailbox"
- Béla Fleck – banjo on "Riker's Mailbox", "Lifeboy" and "Scent of a Mule"
- The Richard Greene Fourteen – strings on "If I Could"

== See also ==
- Tracking – a documentary about the album's production
