= Mike's Song =

1985 song by Phish

"Mike's Song" is a song by the rock band Phish. Originally written in 1985, and debuting that year on March 16, the song written and named after bass player/singer Mike Gordon has been played a total of 488 times (appearing in 28.26% of all of Phish live shows), the third most played song in Phish history (after "You Enjoy Myself" and "Possum").

== Release ==
Despite being one of the band's most popular songs it wasn't until 1997–12 years after its debut, that it finally was officially released on a Phish album when a live version from Hamburg, Germany was released on Slip Stitch and Pass. It has since appeared on numerous live Phish releases including Hampton Comes Alive, Hampton/Winston-Salem '97, and Chicago '94. No studio recording of the song has ever been commercially released.

== "Mike's Groove" ==
"Mike's Song" is the first song in a series of three songs known to Phish fans as "Mike's Groove", which traditionally consists of "Mike's Song" > "I Am Hydrogen" > Weekapaug Groove. “I Am Hydrogen” may be replaced with other songs such as “Lawn Boy” on Slip Stitch and Pass.
