= Junta (album) =

Studio album by Phish
- Released: May 8, 1989
- Recorded: 1988
- Studio: Euphoria Sound Studios (Revere, Massachusetts)
- Genres: Progressive jazz; experimental rock; folk rock; jazz fusion; progressive rock
- Length: 86:40 (cassette and vinyl); 122:25 (CD)
- Labels: Self-release; Elektra; JEMP
- Producer: Phish

Phish chronology
The Man Who Stepped Into Yesterday (1987)	Junta (1989)	Lawn Boy (1990)

Professional ratings
Review scores
Source	Rating
AllMusic	4/5 stars
Entertainment Weekly	C

Junta (/ˈdʒʊntə/ JUUN-tə) is the debut studio album by the American rock band Phish. It was self-released by the band in May 1989 on cassette without the support from a record label, and later received a wider release when Elektra Records reissued it on compact disc in 1992. While Junta was preceded by two demo recordings – The White Tape (1986) and The Man Who Stepped Into Yesterday (1987) – which circulated among the band's fanbase, Junta is the band's first professionally recorded album. Much of the album consists of complex, multi-part suites influenced by progressive rock and jazz rock.

== Recording ==
The album was independently recorded at Euphoria Sound Studio, now known as Sound & Vision Media, in Revere, MA by engineer Gordon Hookailo. Some of the recording was documented on video tape by studio owner Howard Cook. The album is named after Ben "Junta" Hunter, the band's first official manager, whose nickname is pronounced with a hard J and a short U.

In addition to a few more traditionally structured songs, Junta contains symphonic-like epics and multi-part progressive rock and jazz suites.

== Release ==
The recording was released on tape in 1988, and did not appear in stores officially until May 8, 1989. Phish held a release party concert for the Junta tape on May 9, 1989 at The Front club in their native Burlington, Vermont. The album was re-released by Elektra Records on October 26, 1992. The album was certified gold by the RIAA on October 9, 1997, and was certified platinum on July 7, 2004. In February 2009, the album became available as a download.

"Union Federal", "Sanity", and "Icculus" did not appear on the original cassette release, but rather only on the Elektra version, which had extra space on the CD format. "Union Federal" was taken from a jam session, while "Sanity" and "Icculus" were recorded live on July 25, 1988. There was a mix up in adding them to the Elektra version post-date, so the May 3, 1988 date inside the album notes is incorrect. The 2009 digital download also contained these three extra tracks, while the 2012 re-releases did not contain the extra tracks, as these were not part of the original album's stereo master reels. Other songs of the recording era include "Slave To The Traffic Light" and "Alumni Blues", both of which did not make it on the album or get a studio recording, but are live staples and appeared on The White Tape (1986).

== 2012 vinyl reissue ==
On February 13, 2012, it was announced that Junta would be released on vinyl for the first time on April 21, 2012 as a limited edition 3-LP vinyl set, as part of Record Store Day. The set was limited to 5,000 individually numbered copies. The vinyl release was created from the original stereo master reels and includes a free MP3 download of the entire album, transferred from the new vinyl master. Two digital transfers were also made from the original stereo master reels, one recorded at 24 bit / 96 kHz, and a second digital transfer recorded at 24 bit / 192 kHz. On this new release "Contact" is restored to its full length as on the original cassette release.

== Track listing ==
Disc one
No.	Title	Writer(s)	Length
1.	"Fee"	Trey Anastasio	5:23
2.	"You Enjoy Myself"	Anastasio	9:47
3.	"Esther"	Anastasio	9:21
4.	"Golgi Apparatus"	Anastasio; Tom Marshall; Brian Szuter; Aaron Woolf	4:35
5.	"Foam"	Anastasio	6:50
6.	"Dinner and a Movie"	Anastasio; Steve Pollak	3:42
7.	"The Divided Sky"	Anastasio	11:50
8.	"David Bowie"	Anastasio	10:59

Disc two
No.	Title	Writer(s)	Length
1.	"Fluffhead"	Anastasio; Pollak	3:24
2.	"Fluff's Travels" a. "Fluff's Travels" b. "The Chase" c. "Who Do? We Do!" d. "Clod" e. "Bundle of Joy" f. "Arrival"	Anastasio	11:35
3.	"Contact"	Mike Gordon	6:42
4.	"Union Federal"	Anastasio; Jon Fishman; Gordon; Page McConnell	25:31
5.	"Sanity" (live on July 25, 1988)	Anastasio; Pollak	8:22
6.	"Icculus" (live on July 25, 1988)	Anastasio; Marshall	4:24
Total length:			122:25

Notes:

- The original cassette release contains "Fee" through "Dinner and a Movie" on side one, and "The Divided Sky" through "Contact" on side two.
- Tracks 4–6 on disc two are bonus tracks exclusive to CD editions of the album.
- The length of "Contact" on the cassette and vinyl releases was 7:50; the song was shortened on the CD and digital releases and fades into "Union Federal".

== Personnel ==
Phish

Trey Anastasio - guitars, lead vocals, producer
Page McConnell - keyboards, vocals, producer
Mike Gordon - bass guitar, vocals, producer, lead vocals on "Contact"
Jon Fishman - drums, vocals, trombone, producer

Others

Gordon Hookailo - engineer
Jim Davignon - assistant engineer
Bob Ludwig - mastering
Mike Mills - design
Jim Pollock - artwork
Nick McDougal - cassette duplication at ProtoSound Inc.
