= The Man Who Stepped into Yesterday =

Studio album (bootleg) by Phish
- Released: 1988
- Recorded: 1988
- Venue: Goddard College, Plainfield, Vermont
- Length: 63:14
- Label: Self-release
- Producer: Trey Anastasio

Phish chronology
Phish (The White Tape) (1986)	The Man Who Stepped into Yesterday (1988)	Junta (1988)

The Man Who Stepped into Yesterday (often abbreviated as TMWSIY) is a 1988 concept album written by Trey Anastasio, the guitarist and lead vocalist of the American rock band Phish, as his senior thesis while attending Goddard College. Completed in July 1988, the thesis included an essay piece and collection of songs (recorded by Phish) relating an epic tale from the band's fictional land of Gamehendge.

== Background and concept ==
On the album, the story of Gamehendge is told in nine parts, with short spoken narration in between. The saga can be compared to rock concept album projects like The Doors' Celebration of the Lizard or Rush's 2112 suite.

The story's primary protagonist is Colonel Forbin. Other major characters include Tela, the "jewel of Wilson's foul domain" and the "evil" Wilson himself. Several of the album's spoken narrative sections are accompanied by background music borrowed from sections of the Phish songs "Esther" and "McGrupp and the Watchful Hosemasters". The final track, "Possum", is the only song on the album not written by Anastasio, having been written by former Phish member Jeff Holdsworth and later added to the Gamehendge cycle.

Many of the album's tracks have long been included in Phish's regular song rotation and played during the band's live performances. In addition, various versions of the entire Gamehendge saga have been performed, complete with narration, on five occasions in the band's history, usually as the entire first set of a live show. Many other Phish songs also relate in some way to the Gamehendge saga, and appear on later albums and in live performances, including "Llama", "Punch You in the Eye" and "The Divided Sky".

The Mockingbird Foundation, a charity founded by Phish fans to fund music education, is named for the "famous mockingbird" in the saga.

== Official releases ==
Though the album was recorded, it has never been released officially. Phish circulated the studio recording of the suite in 1987 and 1988 and it quickly became a collector's item. At one time Anastasio announced plans in Doniac Schvice, Phish's newsletter, to release the material as an interactive CD-ROM. However, this never happened and the album can only be found in bootleg or in fan-traded form.

The only officially released version of the Gamehendge suite is as part of the band's July 8, 1994 concert, which was released in August 2020. This version of the suite does not include "Possum", but features "Llama", "McGrupp and the Watchful Hosemasters" and "Divided Sky", all of which are connected to the Gamehendge mythology or the story of Colonel Forbin, as well as "NO2", an experimental instrumental that was the B-side to the "Down with Disease" single and is used during the performance to soundtrack Anastasio's introductory narrative.

On December 31, 2023, Phish performed their annual New Year's Eve show at Madison Square Garden, playing music from The Man Who Stepped Into Yesterday with live actors, including Annie Golden, who played the part of the grandmother of Jimmy from "Harpua".

== Track listing ==
All songs written by Trey Anastasio, except where noted.

1. "Narration" – 3:56
2. "The Man Who Stepped Into Yesterday" – 1:45
3. "The Lizards" – 5:50
4. "Narration" – 3:06
5. "Tela" – 6:16
6. "Narration (Ride On A Multibeast)" – 3:26
7. "Wilson" (Anastasio, Tom Marshall, Todd Woolf) – 3:13
8. "Narration" – 0:31
9. "AC/DC Bag" – 3:09
10. "Narration" – 3:18
11. "Colonel Forbin's Ascent" – 4:36
12. "Fly Famous Mockingbird" – 7:37
13. "Narration" – 1:31
14. "The Sloth" – 2:16
15. "Narration" – 1:13
16. "Possum" (Jeff Holdsworth) – 4:29

Note

- Timings and track splits are approximate as there are many different circulating sources running at various speeds and anomalies.

== Personnel ==
Phish

Trey Anastasio – guitars, lead vocals, narration, composer
Page McConnell – keyboards, backing vocals, lead vocals on "Tela"
Mike Gordon – bass guitar, backing vocals, lead vocals on "Possum"
Jon Fishman – drums, backing vocals

== See also ==
- Gamehendge – List of songs, characters, and performances
