= Tom Marshall (singer) =

American singer

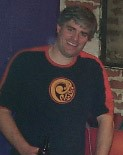
- Tom Marshall in 2001

Background information
- Origin: Princeton, New Jersey
- Genres: Psychedelic rock; rock music; jam band
- Occupations: Musician; lyricist; podcast host
- Instruments: Keyboards; vocals
- Years active: 1982–present
- Member of: Phish
- Formerly of: Amfibian; Bivouac Jaun

Tom Marshall is an American lyricist, keyboardist, and singer-songwriter best known for his association with Trey Anastasio and the rock band Phish. He has been the primary external lyricist for Phish during their career (1983–2000, 2002–2004, 2009–present), with songwriting credits for more than 95 originals. In addition to his songwriting work, Marshall also fronted the rock band Amfibian and hosts the Phish podcast Under the Scales. Marshall is the co-founder of Osiris, a podcast network in partnership with Jambase.

== Personal life ==
Marshall attended Princeton Day School in New Jersey with Anastasio. The duo began writing songs together as early as the eighth grade (the reggae tune "Makisupa Policeman" is often regarded as the duo's first collaboration and the very first Phish original song). Other early collaborations include Bivouac Jaun, a project recorded by Marshall, Anastasio, and their friend Marc Daubert (who occasionally played percussion with Phish in 1984 and wrote the lyrics to their classic "The Curtain With"). Many of the pieces recorded on Bivouac Jaun appeared on The White Tape. Marshall also was instrumental in influencing The Man Who Stepped into Yesterday, a Phish concept album and song cycle about the mystical land of Gamehendge written by Anastasio and used as his senior thesis at Goddard College in 1987.

Marshall, Anastasio, and friends would meet at The Rhombus, a giant piece of art located in a park next to the Institute for Advanced Study in Princeton, New Jersey, and embark on lengthy songwriting sessions. Many characters and locations mentioned in early Phish songs reference these songwriting sessions. In one instance, Marshall wrote the original lyrics to the Gamehendge song "McGrupp and the Watchful Hosemasters" and nailed them to Anastasio's front door. By 1985, Anastasio and Marshall had parted ways as Anastasio became more involved with Phish at the University of Vermont.

Years later in 1989, Marshall apparently heard Phish's Junta album and thought to himself, "these guys really need lyrics." Marshall and Anastasio reunited and began a long songwriting partnership that resulted in over 100 songs over the next fifteen years. Anastasio's 2005 solo album Shine marks the first time since the pre-Junta years that he has not worked with Marshall.

In addition to working closely with Anastasio, Marshall fronts his own band, Amfibian, currently on hiatus.

In the fall of 2010, Marshall collaborated with CT jam band The McLovins to co-write "Cohesive", recorded with Marshall and Anthony Krizan (of Spin Doctors fame) at Krizan's Sonic Boom studios. In mid-November 2010, Marshall joined his longtime friend Trey Anastasio on stage at the historic Richardson Auditorium in Alexander Hall Princeton University bringing them back to their roots.

Marshall has a wife named Lea-Lea, a daughter named Anna and a son named Brodie.

== List of songs ==
This is an incomplete list of titles whose lyrics Tom Marshall has written or co-written.

Song	Artist	Album	Year
The Squirming Coil	Phish	Lawn Boy	1990
Lawn Boy	Phish	Lawn Boy	1990
Bouncing Around the Room	Phish	Lawn Boy	1990
Cavern	Phish	A Picture of Nectar	1992
Stash	Phish	A Picture of Nectar	1992
Guelah Papyrus	Phish	A Picture of Nectar	1992
Glide	Phish	A Picture of Nectar	1992
Chalk Dust Torture	Phish	A Picture of Nectar	1992
Rift	Phish	Rift	1993
Fast Enough for You	Phish	Rift	1993
Maze	Phish	Rift	1993
Sparkle	Phish	Rift	1993
Horn	Phish	Rift	1993
The Wedge	Phish	Rift	1993
My Friend, My Friend	Phish	Rift	1993
It's Ice	Phish	Rift	1993
The Horse	Phish	Rift	1993
Silent in the Morning	Phish	Rift	1993
Julius	Phish	Hoist	1994
Down with Disease	Phish	Hoist	1994
Axilla (Part II)	Phish	Hoist	1994
Lifeboy	Phish	Hoist	1994
Sample in a Jar	Phish	Hoist	1994
Wolfman's Brother	Phish	Hoist	1994
Dog Faced Boy	Phish	Hoist	1994
Demand	Phish	Hoist	1994
Wilson	Phish	A Live One	1995
Free	Phish	Billy Breathes	1996
Character Zero	Phish	Billy Breathes	1996
Waste	Phish	Billy Breathes	1996
Taste	Phish	Billy Breathes	1996
Talk	Phish	Billy Breathes	1996
Theme from the Bottom	Phish	Billy Breathes	1996
Swept Away	Phish	Billy Breathes	1996
Steep	Phish	Billy Breathes	1996
Prince Caspian	Phish	Billy Breathes	1996
Ghost	Phish	The Story of the Ghost	1998
Birds of a Feather	Phish	The Story of the Ghost	1998
Meat	Phish	The Story of the Ghost	1998
Guyute	Phish	The Story of the Ghost	1998
Fikus	Phish	The Story of the Ghost	1998
Shafty	Phish	The Story of the Ghost	1998
Frankie Says	Phish	The Story of the Ghost	1998
Brian and Robert	Phish	The Story of the Ghost	1998
Water in the Sky	Phish	The Story of the Ghost	1998
Roggae	Phish	The Story of the Ghost	1998
Wading in the Velvet Sea	Phish	The Story of the Ghost	1998
The Moma Dance	Phish	The Story of the Ghost	1998
End of Session	Phish	The Story of the Ghost	1998
NICU	Phish	Hampton Comes Alive	1999
Dogs Stole Things	Phish	Hampton Comes Alive	1999
Axilla I	Phish	Hampton Comes Alive	1999
Farmhouse	Phish	Farmhouse	2000
Twist	Phish	Farmhouse	2000
Bug	Phish	Farmhouse	2000
Back on the Train	Phish	Farmhouse	2000
Heavy Things	Phish	Farmhouse	2000
Dirt	Phish	Farmhouse	2000
Piper	Phish	Farmhouse	2000
Sleep	Phish	Farmhouse	2000
Sand	Phish	Farmhouse	2000
Makisupa Policeman	Phish	Live Phish Volume 1	2001
Buffalo Bill	Phish	Live Phish Volume 6	2001
I Am Hydrogen	Phish	Live Phish Volume 6	2001
Vultures	Phish	Live Phish Volume 6	2001
Strange Design	Phish	Live Phish Volume 12	2002
Sleeping Monkey	Phish	Live Phish Volume 12	2002
Pebbles and Marbles	Phish	Round Room	2002
Anything But Me	Phish	Round Room	2002
Mexican Cousin	Phish	Round Room	2002
Friday	Phish	Round Room	2002
Seven Below	Phish	Round Room	2002
46 Days	Phish	Round Room	2002
All of These Dreams	Phish	Round Room	2002
Walls of the Cave	Phish	Round Room	2002
Thunderhead	Phish	Round Room	2002
Waves	Phish	Round Room	2002
Scents and Subtle Sounds (Intro)	Phish	Undermind	2004
Undermind	Phish	Undermind	2004
The Connection	Phish	Undermind	2004
A Song I Heard the Ocean Sing	Phish	Undermind	2004
Crowd Control	Phish	Undermind	2004
Nothing	Phish	Undermind	2004
Two Versions of Me	Phish	Undermind	2004
Scents and Subtle Sounds	Phish	Undermind	2004
Secret Smile	Phish	Undermind	2004
Grind	Phish	Undermind	2004
McGrupp and the Watchful Hosemasters	Phish	Colorado '88	2006
Backwards Down the Number Line	Phish	Joy	2009
Stealing Time from the Faulty Plan	Phish	Joy	2009
Joy	Phish	Joy	2009
Ocelot	Phish	Joy	2009
Kill Devil Falls	Phish	Joy	2009
Light	Phish	Joy	2009
Twenty Years Later	Phish	Joy	2009
Devotion to a Dream	Phish	Fuego	2014
Winterqueen	Phish	Fuego	2014
Sing Monica	Phish	Fuego	2014
Blaze On	Phish	Big Boat	2016
Running Out of Time	Phish	Big Boat	2016
No Men in No Man's Land	Phish	Big Boat	2016
Steam	Phish	Sigma Oasis	2020
Mercury	Phish	Sigma Oasis	2020

== Discography ==
- Amfibian Tales (August 2000)
- Trampled By Lambs and Pecked by the Dove (with Trey Anastasio) (November 1, 2000)
- From the Ether (June 2004)
- Skip the Goodbyes (July 2007)
