= Rift (album) =

Studio album by Phish
- Released: February 2, 1993
- Recorded: September–November 1992
- Studios: White Crow Studios, Burlington, VT; The Castle, Nashville, TN
- Genres: Progressive rock; jazz fusion
- Length: 67:44
- Label: Elektra
- Producer: Barry Beckett

Phish chronology
A Picture of Nectar (1992)	Rift (1993)	Hoist (1994)

Singles from Rift
- 1. "Fast Enough for You" Released: 1993; 2. "The Wedge" Released: 1993

Professional ratings
Review scores
Source	Rating
AllMusic	4/5 stars

Rift is the fourth studio album by the American rock band Phish, released on February 2, 1993, by Elektra Records. It is a concept album, detailing the experience of a man dreaming about the rift in his relationship with his girlfriend. Rift was recorded in September and October 1992 and produced by Barry Beckett. Rift was certified gold by the RIAA on October 15, 1997.

Rift marked the second time that the band had recorded a concept album, but the first—a rock opera–titled The Man Who Stepped into Yesterday—has never been officially released.

== Production ==
All songs were written by Trey Anastasio and Phish lyricist Tom Marshall except "Mound" and "Weigh" by bass guitarist Mike Gordon and "Lengthwise" by drummer Jon Fishman.

The instrumental, "All Things Reconsidered", is an intentional variation on the theme to the National Public Radio news show All Things Considered, and has been featured on the show itself several times. An orchestral version of the song appears on Trey Anastasio's 2004 solo album Seis De Mayo.

Gordon stated that Rift was "more integrated", as the different styles of the band were mixed together within each song, rather than between each song like on their previous album, A Picture of Nectar. Gordon also stated that he thought the album was a "little bit mellower", and that the songwriting showed more maturity.

=== Cover art ===
The cover art was created by New York-based painter David Welker, who worked closely with the band during winter 1993 in order to visually depict each of the album's tracks in a single image, with the notable exception of "The Horse". (For this reason, a horse intentionally appears on the cover of Phish's next album, Hoist.) Relix magazine listed Rift as one of the ten most iconic album covers of all time in 2007.

=== Promotion ===
Elektra promoted Rift with a videotape sent to college radio stations and record stores that featured a six-minute promotional film about the album.

== Track listing ==
No.	Title	Writer(s)	Lead vocals	Length
1.	"Rift"	Trey Anastasio; Tom Marshall	Anastasio; Page McConnell	6:13
2.	"Fast Enough for You"	Anastasio; Marshall	Anastasio	4:51
3.	"Lengthwise"	Jon Fishman	Fishman	1:19
4.	"Maze"	Anastasio; Marshall	Anastasio	8:13
5.	"Sparkle"	Anastasio; Marshall	Anastasio	3:54
6.	"Horn"	Anastasio; Marshall	Anastasio	3:37
7.	"The Wedge"	Anastasio; Marshall	Anastasio	4:07
8.	"My Friend, My Friend"	Anastasio; Marshall	Anastasio	6:09
9.	"Weigh"	Mike Gordon	Gordon	5:08
10.	"All Things Reconsidered"	Anastasio	instrumental	2:32
11.	"Mound"	Gordon	Gordon	6:02
12.	"It's Ice"	Anastasio; Marshall	McConnell (with Anastasio)	8:14
13.	"Lengthwise"	Fishman	Fishman	0:34
14.	"The Horse"	Anastasio; Marshall	Anastasio	1:23
15.	"Silent in the Morning"	Anastasio; Marshall	McConnell	5:28
Total length:				01:07:44

== Personnel ==
Phish

- Trey Anastasio – guitars, lead vocals
- Page McConnell – keyboards, backing vocals, co-lead vocals on "Rift", lead vocals on "It's Ice" and "Silent in the Morning"
- Mike Gordon – bass guitar, backing vocals, lead vocals on "Mound" and "Weigh"
- Jon Fishman – drums, backing vocals, lead vocals on "Lengthwise"

Production

- Engineered by Kevin Halpin, assisted by Jon Altschiller
- Mixed by Justin Niebank, assisted by Mark Nevers
- Recording engineer – Pete Greene, assisted by Greg Parker
- Mastered by Bob Ludwig at Masterdisk
- All songs published by Who Is She? Music, BMI
- Pedal steel on "Fast Enough For You" – Gordon Stone
- Illustrations – David Welker
- Photography – David Gahr
- Design – Mike Mills

== See also ==
- Music of the United States
