= Phish (album) =

Demo album by Phish
- Released: 1986 (cassette); 1998 (CD)
- Recorded: 1984–1986
- Length: 54:27
- Label: Self-released (original release); Phish Dry Goods (reissues)
- Producer: Trey Anastasio

Phish chronology
Phish (1986)	The Man Who Stepped into Yesterday (1987)

Phish (also known as The White Tape) is a demo album released by the American rock band Phish on cassette in 1986. Often cited as the first Phish "album", The White Tape was originally a collection of original material that the band used as a demo/sample tape for venues, and was sometimes labelled "Phish" or simply "Demo". The album was widely circulated among Phish fans for more than a decade before being officially released in 1998.

The album was created from four-track recordings over a period of three years and includes a number of outside musicians performing on various songs. Only "Alumni Blues", "You Enjoy Myself", "AC/DC Bag", "Dog Gone Dog" (a.k.a. "Dog Log"), and "Letter to Jimmy Page" have the four band members together. The remaining tracks were recorded separately by various members and blended together to create the finished album.

The White Tape includes an early version of the Phish epic "You Enjoy Myself", performed a cappella with the band members singing the opening guitar lines. The album also contains avant-garde experimental pieces, instrumental passages, electronic noises and studio trickery. Some songs were further developed and figure heavily in the band's live performances, while a few have rarely been heard since.

All instruments and vocals on "Fuck Your Face", "NO_{2}", "He Ent to the Bog" and "Minkin" are performed solely by bass guitarist Mike Gordon. All instruments and vocals on "Run Like an Antelope" and "And So to Bed" are recorded solely by Trey Anastasio.

"The Divided Sky", "Ingest" and "Fluff's Travels" are performed by Anastasio, Phish lyricist Tom Marshall, and their friend Marc Daubert on percussion. "Aftermath" has Anastasio and Roger Holloway on guitar. "Slave to the Traffic Light" has Tom Marshall on keyboards and Pete Cottone on drums.

In addition to being released on CD, this album was made available on June 7, 2006, as a download in FLAC and MP3 formats at LivePhish.com.

A limited edition white vinyl version was released at Superball IX, Phish's 2011 summer festival with the remainder offered up for sale as part of Record Store Day's "Black Friday" promotion on November 25, 2011. The song "And So to Bed" was finally debuted live in 2021, 25 years after "The White Tape" was originally released.

== Track listing ==
Side one
No.	Title	Writer(s)	Lead vocals	Length
1.	"Alumni Blues"	Trey Anastasio	Anastasio	4:11
2.	"And So to Bed"	Anastasio	instrumental	4:44
3.	"You Enjoy Myself"	Anastasio	Anastasio; Jon Fishman; Mike Gordon; Page McConnell	0:55
4.	"AC/DC Bag"	Anastasio	Anastasio	4:09
5.	"Fuck Your Face"	Gordon	Gordon	2:16
6.	"The Divided Sky"	Anastasio	Anastasio	1:17
7.	"Slave to the Traffic Light"	Anastasio; Dave Abrahams; Steve Pollak	Anastasio	4:35
8.	"Aftermath"	Anastasio; Roger Holloway	instrumental	2:55
9.	"Ingest"	Anastasio	instrumental	1:38

Side two
No.	Title	Writer(s)	Lead vocals	Length
1.	"NO_{2}"	Gordon	Gordon	7:38
2.	"Fluff's Travels"	Anastasio	Anastasio	1:22
3.	"Dog Gone Dog"	Anastasio	Anastasio	4:03
4.	"He Ent to the Bog"	Gordon; Dan McBride	Gordon	3:56
5.	"Run Like an Antelope"	Anastasio; Tom Marshall; Pollak	Anastasio	6:41
6.	"Minkin"	Gordon	Gordon; Marge Minkin	3:00
7.	"Letter to Jimmy Page"	Anastasio	instrumental	1:17
Total length:				54:27

== Personnel ==
Phish – perform as a quartet only on "Alumni Blues", "You Enjoy Myself", "AC/DC Bag", "Dog Gone Dog", and "Letter to Jimmy Page"

- Trey Anastasio – all instruments and vocals on "And So To Bed", "Fluff's Travels", and "Run Like an Antelope", vocals and guitar on "Alumni Blues", "AC/DC Bag", "Divided Sky", "Slave to the Traffic Light", "Aftermath", and "Dog Gone Dog", percussion on "Divided Sky", keyboards on "Slave to the Traffic Light" and "Ingest", bass guitar on "Slave to the Traffic Light", artwork and Phish logo design
- Mike Gordon – bass guitar and vocals on "Alumni Blues", "AC/DC Bag", "Fuck Your Face", "Dog Gone Dog", "He Ent to the Bog" and "Minkin", guitar on "Fuck Your Face", "He Ent to the Bog" and "Minkin", vocals and sound effects on "NO2", bongos on "Minkin", vocals on "You Enjoy Myself"
- Page McConnell – keyboards and organ on "Alumni Blues", "AC/DC Bag", "Dog Gone Dog", and "Letter to Jimmy Page", vocals on "You Enjoy Myself"
- Jon Fishman – drums on "Alumni Blues", "AC/DC Bag", "Dog Gone Dog", and "Letter to Jimmy Page", vocals on "You Enjoy Myself"

Additional musicians

- Dave Abrahams – backing vocals on "Slave to the Traffic Light"
- Ernie Anastasio – laugh on "Ingest"
- Becca Buxbaum – backing vocals on "He Ent to the Bog" and "Minkin", flute on "Minkin"
- Lillian Cherry – backing vocals on "Minkin"
- Pete Cottone – drums on "Slave to the Traffic Light"
- Richard D'Amato – backing vocals on "Minkin"
- Marc Daubert – backing vocals on "Slave to the Traffic Light"
- David Gordon – backing vocals on "He Ent to the Bog"
- Roger Holloway – guitar on "Aftermath"
- Tom Marshall – backing vocals on "Slave to the Traffic Light" and "Run Like An Antelope"
- Marge Minkin – additional vocals on "Minkin"
- Dan McBride – backing vocals on "He Ent to the Bog"
