= Lawn Boy =

Studio album by Phish
- Released: September 21, 1990 (cassette); June 30, 1992 (CD); April 20, 2013 (deluxe vinyl)
- Recorded: May–December 1989
- Studio: Archer Studios, Winooski, Vermont
- Length: 47:45
- Label: Absolute A Go Go, Rough Trade, Elektra, JEMP
- Producer: Phish

Phish chronology
| Junta (1989) | Lawn Boy (1990) | A Picture of Nectar (1992) |

Professional ratings
Review scores
| Source | Rating |
|---|---|
| AllMusic | 3/5 stars |

Lawn Boy is the second studio album by the American rock band Phish. It was released on September 21, 1990, by Absolute A Go Go Records in the United States, with distribution by Rough Trade Records. The album was reissued on June 30, 1992, by Elektra Records.

The original Absolute A Go Go compact disc release featured "Fee" from the band's debut album Junta as a bonus track. The album was certified gold by the RIAA on July 7, 2004. The Elektra Records reissue was remastered by Bob Ludwig and does not include "Fee".

The songs on Lawn Boy include many progressive rock and fusion elements featured on the band's first studio album, Junta, as well as incorporating elements of bluegrass, jazz and barbershop quartet.

According to Phish Archivist Kevin Shapiro:

"Lawn Boy was recorded and mixed at Archer Studios in Winooski, Vermont, in 1989 and 1990 on 16-track 2" tape and was mixed to 1/4" stereo reels. The band won the initial studio time with a first-place Rock Rumble performance on April 21, 1989, at a downtown Burlington, Vermont, club called The Front. The Lawn Boy sessions that followed consisted of mostly live takes with a few effects and overdubs. Engineer Dan Archer acquired a baby grand piano specifically for the recording, Fishman played his drums squeezed into a vocal isolation booth and the band utilized local musicians including members of what would soon be called the Giant Country Horns. Like Junta before it, Phish self-produced Lawn Boy on a hands-on level, surrounding the console for group fades without aid of automation."

In February 2009, Lawn Boy became available as a download in FLAC and MP3 formats at LivePhish.com.

JEMP Records released Lawn Boy on Record Store Day 2013 as a Limited Edition Deluxe 2-LP vinyl set. The LE Deluxe 2-LP vinyl set was limited to 7,500 individually numbered copies and was created from the original 1/4" stereo master reels with lacquers cut by Chris Bellman at Bernie Grundman Mastering. Each LP is pressed onto 180 g audiophile grade vinyl. Deluxe packaging includes an 8-page photo booklet and an etched D-side.

== Track listing ==
Lawn Boy
| No. | Title | Writer(s) | Lead vocals | Length |
|---|---|---|---|---|
| 1. | "The Squirming Coil" | Trey Anastasio; Tom Marshall | Anastasio | 6:02 |
| 2. | "Reba" | Anastasio | Anastasio | 12:26 |
| 3. | "My Sweet One" | Jon Fishman | Anastasio; Mike Gordon; Page McConnell | 2:09 |
| 4. | "Split Open and Melt" | Anastasio | Anastasio | 4:42 |
| 5. | "The Oh Kee Pa Ceremony" (instrumental) | Anastasio | | 1:41 |
| 6. | "Bathtub Gin" | Anastasio; Suzannah Goodman | Anastasio | 4:29 |
| 7. | "Run Like an Antelope" | Anastasio; Marshall; Steve Pollak | Anastasio | 9:50 |
| 8. | "Lawn Boy" | Anastasio; Marshall | McConnell | 2:31 |
| 9. | "Bouncing Around the Room" | Anastasio; Marshall | Anastasio; Gordon; McConnell | 3:55 |
| Total length: | | | | 47:45 |

== Personnel ==
Phish

- Trey Anastasio – guitars, lead vocals, arranger
- Page McConnell – piano, organ, backing vocals, co-lead vocals on "My Sweet One" and "Bouncing Around the Room", lead vocals on "Lawn Boy"
- Mike Gordon – bass guitar, backing vocals, co-lead vocals on "My Sweet One" and "Bouncing Around the Room"
- Jon Fishman – drums, vacuum cleaner, backing vocals

Guest musicians on "Split Open and Melt"

- Giant Country Horns:
  - Joseph Sommerville, Jr. – trumpet
  - Dave "The Truth" Grippo – alto saxophone
  - Russell B. Remington – tenor saxophone
  - Christine Lynch – vocals
