= List of songs recorded by Phish =

This is an incomplete list of original songs composed by the rock band Phish. Certain "sections" of songs have been played separately from time to time, but are not listed below. For instance, the middle section of "Guelah Papyrus" was sometimes played by itself under the name "The Asse Festival.” Before "The Moma Dance" had lyrics, it was called "Black-Eyed Katy.” “Shafty" was once called "Olivia's Pool,” and featured a different arrangement. "Taste" was once known as "The Fog That Surrounds" and contained a slightly different arrangement. And many sections of the multi-part epic "Fluffhead" have been played outside of the song. Some of these sections include "Clod", "The Chase", "Who Do? We Do!!" and "Bundle of Joy.” Phish also performed several songs by The Dude of Life, a friend and collaborator of the band, but those are not listed here, with the exception of songs that The Dude of Life purposely gave to Phish for use in their catalog. Also, songs from the band's solo careers that were also performed by Phish are listed here.

== List ==
Name of song, writer(s), original release, and year of release
Song	Writer(s)	Original release	Year	Reference
"9th Cube, The"	Trey Anastasio; Jon Fishman; Mike Gordon; Page McConnell	Get More Down (as Sci-Fi Soldier)	2022	
"46 Days"	Anastasio; Tom Marshall	Round Room	2002	
"555"	Gordon; Scott Murawski	Fuego	2014	
"A Song I Heard the Ocean Sing"	Anastasio; Marshall	Undermind	2004	
"AC/DC Bag"	Anastasio	Phish	1986	
"Access Me"	Gordon	Undermind	2004	
"Acoustic Army"	Anastasio; Fishman; Gordon; McConnell	Live Phish 10.21.95	2007	
"Aftermath"	Anastasio	Phish	1986	
"Alaska"	Anastasio; Marshall	Party Time	2009	
"Albert"	Anastasio; Fishman; Gordon; McConnell	Siket Disc, The	1999	
"A Life Beyond the Dream"	Anastasio	Sigma Oasis	2020	
"All of These Dreams"	Anastasio; Marshall; Scott Herman	Round Room	2002	
"All Things Reconsidered"	Anastasio	Rift	1993	
"Alumni Blues"	Anastasio	Phish	1986	
"Anarchy"	—	Unreleased	—	
"And So to Bed"	Anastasio	Phish	1986	
"Anything But Me"	Anastasio; Marshall; Herman	Round Room	2002	
"Architect"	Anastasio; Steve Pollak	Traveler (Trey Anastasio solo)	2012	
"Army of One"	McConnell	Undermind	2004	
"A Wave of Hope"	Anastasio	Lonely Trip (Note: Later recorded by Phish for Evolve) (Trey Anastasio solo)	2020	
"Axilla"	Anastasio; Marshall	Hampton Comes Alive	1999	
"Axilla (Part II)	Anastasio; Marshall	Hoist	1994	
"Babylon Baby"	Gordon	Moss (Mike Gordon solo)	2010	
"Back on the Train"	Anastasio; Marshall	Farmhouse	2000	
"Backwards Down the Number Line"	Anastasio; Marshall	Joy	2009	
"Bathtub Gin"	Anastasio; Suzanne Goodman	Lawn Boy	1990	
"Beauty of a Broken Heart"	McConnell	Page McConnell (Page McConnell solo)	2007	
"Big Ball Jam"	Anastasio; Fishman; Gordon; McConnell	Live Phish Volume 10	2002	
"Big Black Furry Creature from Mars"	Gordon	Hampton Comes Alive	1999	
"Billy Breathes"	Anastasio; Marshall	Billy Breathes	1996	
"Birds of a Feather"	Anastasio; Fishman; Gordon; McConnell; Marshall	Story of the Ghost, The	1998	
"Birdwatcher, The"	Anastasio; Fishman; Gordon; McConnell	Party Time	2009	
"Bittersweet Motel"	Anastasio; Fishman; Gordon; McConnell	Live Phish 7.29.03	2003	
"Black-Eyed Katy"	Anastasio; Fishman; Gordon; McConnell	Hampton/Winston-Salem '97	2011	
"Blaze On"	Anastasio; Marshall	Big Boat	2016	
"Bliss"	Anastasio	Billy Breathes	1996	
"Bouncing Around the Room"	Anastasio; Marshall	Lawn Boy	1990	
"Breath and Burning"	Anastasio	Big Boat	2016	
"Brian and Robert"	Anastasio; Marshall	Story of the Ghost, The	1998	
"Brother"	Anastasio; Fishman; Gordon; McConnell	Live Phish Volume 15	2002	
"Buffalo Bill"	Anastasio; Marshall	Live Phish Volume 6	2001	
"Bug"	Anastasio; Marshall	Farmhouse	2000	
"Buried Alive" (Note: Studio version is listed as "Abominable Snowman/Buried Alive")	Anastasio	Home for the Holidays (various artists compilation)	1990	
"Burn That Bridge"	Anastasio; Amanda Green	—	2010	
"Bye Bye Foot"	Fishman	Walnut Creek	2008	
"Camel Walk"	Jeff Holdsworth	Colorado '88	2006	
"Can't Always Listen"	Anastasio; Pollak	Live Phish 12.30.15	2015	
"Can't Come Back"	Gordon	Party Time	2009	
"Carini"	Anastasio; Fishman; Gordon; McConnell	Live Phish Volume 3	2001	
"Cars Trucks Buses"	McConnell	Billy Breathes	1996	
"Catapult"	Gordon	A Picture of Nectar	1992	
"Cavern"	Anastasio; Marshall; Herman	A Picture of Nectar	1992	
"Chalk Dust Torture"	Anastasio; Marshall	A Picture of Nectar	1992	
"Character Zero"	Anastasio; Marshall	Billy Breathes	1996	
"Clear Your Mind"	Anastasio; Fishman; Gordon; McConnell	Get More Down (as Sci-Fi Soldier)	2022	
"Clone"	Gordon	Clone (Leo Kottke and Mike Gordon)	2002	
"Colonel Forbin's Ascent"	Anastasio	Live Phish Volume 9	2002	
"Connection, The"	Anastasio; Marshall	Undermind	2004	
"Contact"	Gordon	Junta	1989	
"Cool Amber and Mercury"	Anastasio; Fishman; Gordon; McConnell	Kasvot Växt: í rokk	2018	
"Crowd Control"	Anastasio; Marshall	Undermind	2004	
"Curtain, The"	Anastasio; Marc Daubert	Live Phish Volume 1	2001	
"Curtain With, The"	Anastasio; Daubert	Live in Brooklyn	2006	
"Dave's Energy Guide"	Anastasio; Fishman; Dave Abrahams	Colorado '88	2006	
"David Bowie"	Anastasio	Junta	1989	
"Dear Mrs. Reagan"	Jim Pollock; Rich Kleinman	Unreleased	—	
"Death Don't Hurt Very Long"	Anastasio; Fishman; Gordon; McConnell	Kasvot Växt: í rokk	2018	
"Demand"	Anastasio; Marshall	Hoist	1994	
"Destiny Unbound"	Gordon	Live Phish 02.28.03	2003	
"Devotion to a Dream"	Anastasio; Marshall	Fuego	2014	
"Dinner and a Movie"	Anastasio; Pollak	Junta	1989	
"Dirt"	Anastasio; Marshall	Farmhouse	2000	
"Discern"	Anastasio; Marshall	Seis de Mayo (Trey Anastasio solo)	2004	
"Divided Sky, The"	Anastasio	Phish (Note: Full-length version appears on Junta)	1989	
"Dog Faced Boy"	Anastasio; Fishman; McConnell; Marshall	Hoist	1994	
"Dog Log" (Note: Also known as "Dog Gone Dog")	Anastasio	Phish	1986	
"Dogs Stole Things"	Anastasio; Marshall	Hampton Comes Alive	1999	
"Don't Doubt Me"	Anastasio; Fishman; Gordon; McConnell	Get More Down (as Sci-Fi Soldier)	2022	
"Don't Get Me Wrong"	Anastasio; John Popper	Unreleased	—	
"Down with Disease"	Anastasio; Marshall	Hoist	1994	
"Dr. Gabel"	Anastasio; Pollak	Unreleased	—	
"Drifting"	Anastasio; Russ Lawton; Tony Markellis	Trey Anastasio (Trey Anastasio solo)	2002	
"Driver"	Anastasio; Marshall	Hampton Comes Alive (Note: Later recorded for Japanese edition of Farmhouse)	2000	
"Egg in a Hole"	Anastasio; Fishman; Gordon; McConnell	Get More Down (as Sci-Fi Soldier)	2022	
"Eliza"	Anastasio	A Picture of Nectar	1992	
"End of Session"	Anastasio; Fishman; Gordon; McConnell; Marshall	Story of the Ghost, The	1998	
"Esther"	Anastasio	Junta	1989	
"Ether Edge"	Anastasio	Evolve	2024	
"Evening Song"	Anastasio; Marshall	Sigma Oasis	2020	
"Everything Is Hollow"	Anastasio; Fishman; Gordon; McConnell	Kasvot Växt: í rokk	2018	
"Everything's Right"	Anastasio; Marshall	Sigma Oasis	2020	
"Evolve"	Anastasio; Marshall; Herman	Lonely Trip (Trey Anastasio solo)	2020	
"Faht"	Fishman	A Picture of Nectar	1992	
"Farmhouse"	Anastasio; Marshall	Hampton Comes Alive (Note: Studio version later appeared on Farmhouse)	1999	
"Fast Enough for You"	Anastasio; Marshall	Rift	1993	
"Fee"	Anastasio	Junta	1989	
"Fikus"	Anastasio; Fishman; Gordon; McConnell; Marshall	Story of the Ghost, The	1998	
"Final Flight"	McConnell	Vida Blue (Vida Blue)	2002	
"Final Hurrah, The"	Anastasio; Fishman; Gordon; McConnell	Kasvot Växt: í rokk	2018	
"First Tube"	Anastasio; Lawton; Markellis	Farmhouse	2000	
"Fish Bass"	Anastasio; Fishman; Gordon; McConnell	Siket Disc, The	1999	
"Flat Fee"	Anastasio	Live Phish Volume 19	2003	
"Fluff's Travels"	Anastasio	Phish	1986	
"Fluffhead"	Anastasio; Pollak	Junta	1989	
"Fly Famous Mockingbird"	Anastasio	Live Phish Volume 9	2002	
"Foam"	Anastasio	Junta	1989	
"Frankie Says"	Anastasio; Fishman; Gordon; McConnell	Story of the Ghost, The	1998	
"Free"	Anastasio; Marshall	Billy Breathes	1996	
"Friday"	Anastasio; Marshall; Herman	Round Room	2002	
"Friends"	Fishman	Big Boat	2016	
"Fuck Your Face"	Gordon	Phish	1986	
"Fuego"	Anastasio; Fishman; Gordon; McConnell	Fuego	2014	
"Get More Down"	Anastasio; Fishman; Gordon; McConnell	Get More Down (as Sci-Fi Soldier)	2022	
"Ghost"	Anastasio; Fishman; Gordon; McConnell; Marshall	Story of the Ghost, The	1998	
"Glide"	Anastasio; Fishman; Gordon; McConnell Marshall Dave Abrahams	A Picture of Nectar	1992	
"Glide II"	Anastasio; Marshall	Unreleased	—	
"Golgi Apparatus"	Anastasio; Marshall; Brian Szuter; Aaron Woolf	Junta	1989	
"Gone"	Anastasio	Party Time	2009	
"Gotta Jibboo"	Anastasio; Lawton; Markellis	Farmhouse	2000	
"Grind"	Anastasio; Fishman; Gordon; McConnell	Undermind	2004	
"Guelah Papyrus"	Anastasio	A Picture of Nectar	1992	
"Gumbo"	Anastasio; Fishman	A Live One	1995	
"Guy Forget"	—	Unreleased	—	
"Guyute"	Anastasio; Marshall	Story of the Ghost, The	1998	
"Ha Ha Ha"	Fishman	Hampton Comes Alive	1999	
"Halfway to the Moon"	McConnell	Fuego	2014	
"Halley's Comet"	Richard "Nancy" Wright	Live Phish Volume 1	2001	
"Happy Whip and Dung Song, The"	Anastasio; Fishman; Gordon; McConnell	Siket Disc, The	1999	
"Harpua"	Anastasio; Fishman	Live Phish Volume 2	2001	
"Harry Hood"	Anastasio; Fishman; Gordon; McConnell; Brian Long	A Live One	1995	
"Heavy Things"	Anastasio; Marshall; Herman	Farmhouse	2000	
"He Ent to the Bog"	Gordon	Phish	1986	
"Hey Stranger"	Anastasio	Mercy (Trey Anastasio solo)	2022	
"Home"	McConnell	Big Boat	2016	
"Horn"	Anastasio; Marshall	Rift	1993	
"Horse, The"	Anastasio; Marshall	Rift	1993	
"Howling, The"	Anastasio; Fishman; Gordon; McConnell	Get More Down (as Sci-Fi Soldier)	2022	
"Human Nature"	Gordon; Murawski	Evolve	2024	
"I Always Wanted It This Way"	McConnell	Big Boat	2016	
"I Am Hydrogen"	Anastasio; Daubert; Marshall	Live Phish Volume 6	2001	
"I Am in Miami"	Anastasio; Fishman; Gordon; McConnell	Get More Down (as Sci-Fi Soldier)	2022	
"I Been Around"	McConnell	Joy	2009	
"I Didn't Know"	Wright	Live Phish Volume 20	2003	
"Icculus"	Anastasio	Junta (CD only)	1992	
"Idea"	Gordon	Moss (Mike Gordon solo)	2010	
"If I Could"	Anastasio; Marshall	Hoist	1994	
"If I Told You"	McConnell	Party Time	2009	
"In a Hole"	Anastasio	Unreleased	—	
"In a Misty Glade"	Anastasio; Marshall	Party Time	2009	
"Inner Reaches of Outer, The"	Anastasio; Fishman; Gordon; McConnell	Get More Down (as Sci-Fi Soldier)	2022	
"Ingest"	Anastasio	Phish	1986	
"Inlaw Josie Wales, The"	Anastasio	Farmhouse	2000	
"Insects"	Anastasio; Fishman; Gordon; McConnell	Siket Disc, The	1999	
"Invisible"	Gordon; Joseph Linitz	Sixty Six Steps (Mike Gordon and Leo Kottke)	2005	
"It's Ice"	Anastasio; Marshall	Rift	1993	
"Jennifer Dances"	Anastasio; Marshall	Unreleased	—	
"Joy"	Anastasio; Marshall	Joy	2009	
"Julius"	Anastasio; Marshall	Hoist	1994	
"Keeping It Real"	Gordon; Scott Murawski	Unreleased	—	
"Keyboard Army"	Anastasio; Fishman; Gordon; McConnell	Live Phish Volume 1	2001	
"Kill Devil Falls"	Anastasio; Marshall	Joy	2009	
"Knuckle Bone Broth Avenue"	Anastasio; Fishman; Gordon; McConnell	Get More Down (as Sci-Fi Soldier)	2022	
"Kung"	Fishman	Live in Brooklyn	2006	
"Landlady, The"	Anastasio	A Picture of Nectar	1992	
"Lawn Boy"	Anastasio; Marshall	Lawn Boy	1990	
"Leaves"	Anastasio; Marshall	Sigma Oasis	2020	
"Lengthwise"	Fishman	Rift	1993	
"Leprechaun"	Anastasio	Unreleased	—	
"Let Me Lie"	Anastasio; Marshall	Bar 17 (Trey Anastasio solo)	2006	
"Letter to Jimmy Page"	Anastasio	Phish	1986	
"Lifeboy"	Anastasio; Marshall	Hoist	1994	
"Life Saving Gun"	Anastasio; McConnell	January (Page McConnell and Trey Anastasio)	2023	
"Light"	Anastasio; Marshall	Joy	2009	
"Limb by Limb"	Anastasio; Marshall; Herman	Story of the Ghost, The	1998	
"Line, The"	Anastasio; Fishman; Gordon; McConnell	Fuego	2014	
"Liquid Time"	Anastasio	Party Time	2009	
"Lizards, The"	Anastasio	Live Phish Volume 2	2001	
"Llama"	Anastasio	A Picture of Nectar	1992	
"Lonely Trip"	Anastasio; Herman; Marshall	Evolve (Trey Anastasio solo)	2020	
"Lushington"	Anastasio	Unreleased		
"Maggie's Revenge"	Anastasio; Fishman; Gordon; McConnell	Undermind	2004	
"Magilla"	McConnell	A Picture of Nectar	1992	
"Makisupa Policeman"	Anastasio; Marshall	Live Phish Volume 1	2001	
"Man Who Stepped into Yesterday, The"	Anastasio	Live Phish Volume 9	2001	
"Mango Song, The"	Anastasio	A Picture of Nectar	1992	
"Maze"	Anastasio; Marshall	Rift	1993	
"McGrupp and the Watchful Hosemasters"	Anastasio	Colorado '88	2006	
"Meat"	Anastasio; Fishman; Gordon; McConnell	Story of the Ghost, The	1998	
"Meatstick"	Anastasio; Fishman; Gordon; McConnell; Marshall; Herman	Live Phish Downloads 6.27.10	2010	
"Mercury"	Anastasio; Marshall	Sigma Oasis	2020	
"Mercy"	Anastasio	Mercy (Trey Anastasio solo)	2022	
"Mexican Cousin"	Anastasio; Marshall	Round Room	2002	
"Mist" (Note: Also known as "Mountains in the Mist")	Anastasio; Marshall	Farmhouse (Japanese edition only)	2000	
"Mike's Song"	Gordon	Slip Stitch and Pass	1997	
"Minkin"	Gordon	Phish	1986	
"Miss You"	Anastasio	Big Boat	2016	
"Mock Song"	Gordon	Round Room	2002	
"Moma Dance, The"	Anastasio; Fishman; Gordon; McConnell; Marshall	Story of the Ghost, The	1998	
"Monsters"	Anastasio	Evolve	2024	
"Montana"	Anastasio; Fishman; Gordon; McConnell	A Live One	1995	
"More"	Anastasio	Big Boat	2016	
"Most Events Aren't Planned"	McConnell	Vida Blue (Vida Blue)	2002	
"Mound"	Gordon	Rift	1993	
"Mozambique"	Anastasio; Lawton; Markellis	Plasma (Trey Anastasio solo)	2003	
"Mr. Completely"	Anastasio	One Man's Trash (Trey Anastasio solo)	1998	
"My Friend, My Friend"	Anastasio; Marshall	Rift	1993	
"My Left Toe"	Anastasio; Fishman; Gordon; McConnell	Siket Disc, The	1999	
"My Problem Right There"	Anastasio; Green	Unreleased	—	
"My Sweet One"	Fishman	Lawn Boy	1990	
"Name Is Slick, The"	Anastasio; Fishman; Gordon; McConnell	Siket Disc, The	1999	
"Never"	Anastasio; Marshall	Paper Wheels	2015	
"NICU"	Anastasio; Marshall	Hampton Comes Alive	1999	
"NO_{2}"	Gordon	Phish	1986	
"No Dogs Allowed"	Anastasio	Colorado '88	2006	
"No Men in No Man's Land"	Anastasio; Marshall	Big Boat	2016	
"Nothing"	Anastasio; Marshall	Amfibian Tales (Note: Later recorded by Phish for Undermind) (Tom Marshall and Co.)	2000	
"Oblivion"	Anastasio; Marshall	Evolve	2024	
"Ocelot"	Anastasio; Marshall	Joy	2009	
"Oh Kee Pa Ceremony, The"	Anastasio	Lawn Boy	1990	
"Olivia's Pool"	Anastasio; Marshall	Live Phish Volume 11	2002	
"Only a Dream"	Gordon	Party Time	2009	
"Party Time"	Fishman	Party Time	2009	
"Passing Through"	Anastasio; Fishman; Gordon; McConnell	Kasvot Växt: í rokk	2018	
"Pebbles and Marbles"	Anastasio; Marshall	Round Room	2002	
"Petrichor"	Anastasio	Big Boat	2016	
"Pigtail"	Anastasio; Marshall	Traveler (Trey Anastasio solo)	2012	
"Pillow Jets"	Anastasio	Evolve	2024	
"Piper"	Anastasio; Marshall	Hampton Comes Alive	1999	
"Play by Play"	Anastasio; Fishman; Gordon; McConnell	Kasvot Växt: í rokk	2018	
"Poor Heart"	Gordon	A Picture of Nectar	1992	
"Possum"	Holdsworth	Hampton Comes Alive	1999	
"Prep School Hippie"	—	Unreleased	—	
"Prince Caspian"	Anastasio; Marshall	Billy Breathes	1996	
"Punch Me in the Eye"	—	Unreleased	—	
"Punch You in the Eye"	Anastasio	Live Phish Volume 3	2001	
"Quadrophonic Toppling"	Anastasio; Fishman; Gordon; McConnell	Siket Disc, The	1999	
"Reba"	Anastasio	Lawn Boy	1990	
"Revolution"	—	Unreleased	—	
"Rift"	Anastasio; Marshall	Rift	1993	
"Riker's Mailbox"	Anastasio; Fishman; Gordon; McConnell	Hoist	1994	
"Rock-A-William"	—	Unreleased	—	
"Roggae"	Anastasio; Fishman; Gordon; McConnell; Marshall	Story of the Ghost, The	1998	
"Round Room"	Gordon; Linitz	Round Room	2002	
"Run Like an Antelope"	Anastasio; Marshall; Pollak	Phish (Note: Later recorded for Lawn Boy)	1990	
"Runaway Jim"	Anastasio Dave Abrahams	Live Phish Volume 6	2001	
"Running Out of Time"	Anastasio; Marshall	Big Boat	2016	
"Sample in a Jar"	Anastasio; Marshall	Hoist	1994	
"Sand"	Anastasio; Marshall; Lawton; Markellis	Farmhouse	2000	
"Sanity"	Anastasio	Junta (CD only)	1992	
"Saw It Again"	Anastasio; Marshall	Amsterdam	2015	
"Say It to Me S.A.N.T.O.S."	Anastasio; Fishman; Gordon; McConnell	Kasvot Växt: í rokk	2018	
"Scent of a Mule"	Gordon	Hoist	1994	
"Scents and Subtle Sounds"	Anastasio; Marshall	Undermind	2004	
"Scents and Subtle Sounds (Intro)"	Anastasio; Marshall	Undermind	2004	
"Secret Smile"	Anastasio; Marshall	Undermind	2004	
"Set Your Soul Free"	Anastasio	Burn It Down (Trey Anastasio Band)	2020	
"Setting Sail"	Anastasio; Marshall	Unreleased	—	
"Seven Below"	Anastasio; Marshall	Round Room	2002	
"Shade"	Anastasio; Marshall	Sigma Oasis	2020	
"Shafty"	Anastasio; Fishman; Gordon; McConnell	Story of the Ghost, The	1998	
"Show of Life"	Anastasio; Pollak	TAB at the TAB (Trey Anastasio Band)	2010	
"Shrine"	Anastasio; Marshall	Party Time	2009	
"Sigma Oasis"	Anastasio; Marshall	Sigma Oasis	2020	
"Silent in the Morning"	Anastasio; Marshall	Rift	1993	
"Simple"	Gordon	A Live One	1995	
"Sing Monica"	Anastasio; Marshall	Fuego	2014	
"Skippy the Wondermouse"	Anastasio; Dina Anastasio; Pollak	Unreleased	—	
"Slave to the Traffic Light"	Anastasio; Dave Abrahams; Pollak	Phish	1986	
"Sleep"	Anastasio; Marshall	Farmhouse	2000	
"Sleep Again"	Anastasio; Brendan O'Brien	Shine (Trey Anastasio solo)	2005	
"Sleeping Monkey"	Anastasio; Marshall	Live Phish Volume 12	2002	
"Sloth, The"	Anastasio	New Year's Eve 1995 – Live at Madison Square Garden	2005	
"Soul Planet"	Anastasio	TAB at the Fox Theater (Trey Anastasio Band)	2019	
"Sparkle"	Anastasio; Marshall	Rift	1993	
"Splinters of Hail"	Anastasio	Party Time	2009	
"Split Open and Melt"	Anastasio	Lawn Boy	1990	
"Spock's Brain"	Anastasio; Fishman; Gordon; McConnell	Live Phish Downloads 6.20.95	2013	
"Spread It 'Round"	Anastasio; Marshall	Live Phish 7.15.03	2003	
"Something Living Here"	Anastasio; Fishman; Gordon; McConnell	Get More Down (as Sci-Fi Soldier)	2022	
"Squirming Coil, The"	Anastasio; Marshall	Lawn Boy	1990	
"Stash"	Anastasio; Marshall	A Picture of Nectar	1992	
"Stealing Time from the Faulty Plan"	Anastasio; Marshall	Joy	2009	
"Steam"	Anastasio; Marshall	Sigma Oasis	2020	
"Steep"	Anastasio; Fishman; Gordon; McConnell; Marshall	Billy Breathes	1996	
"Strange Design"	Anastasio; Marshall	"Free" single	1996	
"Stray Dog"	Anastasio; Fishman; Gordon; McConnell	Kasvot Växt: í rokk	2018	
"Sugar Shack"	Gordon	Joy	2009	
"Summer of '89"	Anastasio; Green	Unreleased	—	
"Suzy Greenberg"	Anastasio; Pollak	Live Phish Volume 1	2001	
"Swept Away"	Anastasio; Marshall	Billy Breathes	1996	
"Talk"	Anastasio	Billy Breathes	1996	
"Taste"	Anastasio; Fishman; Gordon; McConnell; Marshall	Billy Breathes	1996	
"Tela"	Anastasio	Live Phish Volume 1	2001	
"Thanksgiving"	Anastasio; Fishman; Gordon; McConnell	Get More Down (as Sci-Fi Soldier)	2022	
"Theme from the Bottom"	Anastasio; Fishman; Gordon; McConnell; Marshall	Billy Breathes	1996	
"Things People Do"	McConnell	Big Boat	2016	
"Thread"	Anastasio; Marshall	Sigma Oasis	2020	
"Thunderhead"	Anastasio; Marshall	Round Room	2002	
"Tide Turns"	Anastasio	Big Boat	2016	
"Time Turns Elastic"	Anastasio	Joy	2009	
"Tiny"	Anastasio; Fishman; Gordon; McConnell	Undermind (iTunes bonus track)	2004	
"Title Track"	Anastasio; Fishman; Gordon; McConnell	Siket Disc, The	1999	
"Tomorrow's Song"	Fishman	Undermind	2004	
"Train Song"	Gordon; Linitz	Billy Breathes	1996	
"Turtle in the Clouds"	Anastasio; Fishman; Gordon; McConnell	Kasvot Växt: í rokk	2018	
"Tube"	Anastasio; Fishman	Hampton Comes Alive	1999	
"Tweezer"	Anastasio; Fishman; Gordon; McConnell	A Picture of Nectar	1992	
"Tweezer Reprise"	Anastasio; Fishman; Gordon; McConnell	A Picture of Nectar	1992	
"Twenty Years Later"	Anastasio; Marshall	Joy	2009	
"Twist"	Anastasio; Marshall	Farmhouse	2000	
"Two Versions of Me"	Anastasio; Marshall	Undermind	2004	
"Undermind"	Anastasio; Marshall; Herman	Undermind	2004	
"Union Federal"	Anastasio; Fishman; Gordon; McConnell	Junta (CD only)	1992	
"Unwinding, The"	Anastasio; Fishman; Gordon; McConnell	Get More Down (as Sci-Fi Soldier)	2022	
"Valdese"	Anastasio; Marshall	Evolve	2024	
"Vultures"	Anastasio; Marshall; Herman	Live Phish Volume 6	2001	
"Waiting All Night"	Anastasio; Fishman; Gordon; McConnell	Fuego	2014	
"Wading in the Velvet Sea"	Anastasio; Marshall	Story of the Ghost, The	1998	
"Waking Up"	Anastasio; Marshall	Unreleased	—	
"Waking Up Dead"	Gordon; Murawski	Big Boat	2016	
"Walfredo"	Anastasio; Fishman; Gordon; McConnell	Live Phish Downloads 6.27.10	2010	
"Walls of the Cave"	Anastasio; Marshall	Round Room	2002	
"Waste"	Anastasio; Marshall	Billy Breathes	1996	
"Water in the Sky"	Anastasio; Marshall	Story of the Ghost, The	1998	
"Waves"	Anastasio; Marshall; Herman	Round Room	2002	
"We Are Come to Outlive Our Brains"	Anastasio; Fishman; Gordon; McConnell	Kasvot Växt: í rokk	2018	
"Wedge, The"	Anastasio; Marshall	Rift	1993	
"Weekapaug Groove"	Anastasio; Fishman; Gordon; McConnell	Slip Stitch and Pass	1997	
"Weigh"	Gordon	Rift	1993	
"Well, The"	Anastasio; Marshall	Evolve (vinyl only)	2024	
"What Things Seem"	Gordon	Moss (Mike Gordon solo)	2010	
"What's the Use?"	Anastasio; Fishman; Gordon; McConnell	Siket Disc, The	1999	
"Wilson"	Anastasio; Marshall; Woolf	A Live One	1995	
"Windora Bug"	Anastasio; Marshall	TAB at the TAB (Trey Anastasio Band)	2010	
"Windy City"	McConnell	Party Time	2009	
"Wingsuit"	Anastasio; Fishman; Gordon; McConnell	Fuego	2014	
"Winterqueen"	Anastasio; Marshall	Fuego	2014	
"Wolfman's Brother"	Anastasio; Fishman; Gordon; McConnell; Marshall	Hoist	1994	
"Wombat"	Anastasio; Fishman; Gordon; McConnell	Fuego	2014	
"You Enjoy Myself"	Anastasio	Phish	1989	

== See also ==
- List of Phish cover versions
