= Trey Anastasio Band =

American musical group

- Also known as: Eight Foot Fluorescent Tubes, 70 Volt Parade
- Origin: Burlington, Vermont, United States
- Genres: Rock, jazz fusion, progressive rock
- Years active: 1999–present
- Labels: Elektra Records
- Spinoff of: Phish
- Members: Trey Anastasio; Russ Lawton; Jennifer Hartswick; Ray Paczkowski; Cyro Baptista; Natalie Cressman; Dezron Douglas; Kenneth Whalum
- Past members: Tony Markellis; Dave Grippo; Andy Moroz; Russell Remington; Peter Apfelbaum; James Casey

Trey Anastasio Band, or TAB, is an American rock band led by singer-songwriter and guitarist Trey Anastasio of Phish. The band has existed in several permutations since 1998. Versions of the band have had different members, and briefly used the names Eight Foot Fluorescent Tubes and 70 Volt Parade. The current lineup consists of Anastasio (vocals, guitar), Russ Lawton (drums), Ray Paczkowski (keyboards), Cyro Baptista (percussion), Dezron Douglas (bass), Natalie Cressman (trombone, vocals), Jennifer Hartswick (trumpet, vocals), and Kenneth Whalum (saxophone, vocals). Anastasio and Lawton are the only remaining members from the band's original 1998 formation. Musicians from TAB have accompanied Anastasio on several of his solo studio albums.

== The beginning ==
Trey's band had its roots in his brother-in-law's Vermont nightclub, Higher Ground. On April 17, 1998, for the second show in the club's existence, Anastasio put together a band of local Vermont musicians for a one time performance under the name Eight Foot Fluorescent Tubes. Among the five musicians onstage with Trey that evening were drummer Russ Lawton and bassist Tony Markellis. They debuted material that night that became part of the repertoire of both Phish and Anastasio's solo career.

== The trio ==
Less than a year later, on February 15, 1999, Trey performed a benefit show at Higher Ground for a local arts charity with Lawton and Markellis. Later that spring, the trio (as they are referred to on Anastasio's website) went on a national tour of clubs and theatres. Most of the shows sold out, which featured a solo acoustic set by Anastasio and an electric set by The Trio. They debuted more new songs, many of them appearing on Phish’s 2000 album, Farmhouse. Absent from the tour were any songs from Trey's first solo album, One Man's Trash, which was released in late 1998.

In Spring 2018, Trey toured again as a trio alongside Lawton and Markellis. The tour began on April 17, 2018—on the 20 year anniversary of Trey's first solo show, Eight Foot Fluorescent Tubes.

== The sextet ==
After Phish went on hiatus in 2000, Anastasio took his project on the road and added a horn section. Saxophonist Dave Grippo, a Burlington music teacher with a long history with Phish, trombone player Andy Moroz, and trumpet player Jennifer Hartswick joined Trey's band for this and all future tours. These shows, and all to follow had two full sets with the band, and no solo acoustic set.

== The octet ==
Later in 2001, with Phish still inactive, Anastasio booked a summer tour of large amphitheatres where Phish had regularly performed in recent years. This tour also included some venues that Phish hadn't played in years like Red Rocks in Colorado and Jones Beach in Long Island, New York. In the fall, two more members were added to Trey's band, tenor saxophonist/flautist Russell Remington and keyboardist Ray Paczkowski.

== The dectet ==
2002 saw the release of Trey's self-titled second album, and a summer tour to support it. This tour of amphitheatres was significantly smaller than the 2001 tour. At this time, Anastasio added the final two members to the group, Brazilian percussionist Cyro Baptista and the multitalented Peter Apfelbaum.

Late in the summer of 2002, Phish announced their reunion, with their first show slated for New Year's Eve. During the fall of 2002, with Anastasio still promoting his second solo album, he took his dectet for a tour of smaller venues.

In 2003, with a Phish summer tour planned, Trey scaled back his touring. He played a brief tour that spring, before spending his first summer in three years with Phish.

In 2004, Trey played some random dates. He performed at the Easter jam at Higher Ground, with the other members of Phish. He then played a surprise birthday party in Stowe, Vermont.

In May, with Phish tour dates already booked, Anastasio made the announcement that Phish would be breaking up and the upcoming summer tour would be their last.

In June, days before Phish would start its final tour, Trey performed at the Bonnaroo music festival.

On September 18, 2004, about a month after what was then Phish's final performance, Trey would play his final performance to date with the dectet, and his last show with Russ Lawton and Tony Markellis until 2008 at the Austin City Limits Music Festival.

== Subsequent solo bands ==
In the spring of 2005, Anastasio introduced a new backing band, 70 Volt Parade, featuring Paczkowski, Skeeto Valdez on drums, Peter Chwazik on bass, and Les Hall on guitar and keyboards. After only a few months, Anastasio replaced Chwazik with Tony Hall of Ivan Neville's Dumpstaphunk, and added Hartswick and Christina Durfee on backing vocals. Anastasio then replaced Valdez with Raymond Weber. Russell Remington also rejoined Anastasio shortly thereafter. In 2006, Les Hall left the band, and it was renamed Trey Anastasio Band. Although Anastasio's solo band was unofficially called Trey Anastasio Band since it started in 1998, this was the first time his band officially called itself under that name. Jeff Cressman and Jeff Sipe, who replaced Weber, toured with the project in 2006 and 2007.

== Fall 2008 tour to 2020 ==
In October 2008, Anastasio set out on a short tour billed as "Trey Anastasio & Classic TAB". This quartet featured Anastasio on guitar, Tony Markellis on bass, Russ Lawton on drums, and Ray Paczkowski on keyboards. In 2010, Jennifer Hartswick officially rejoined the project, renamed Trey Anastasio Band, and has remained with the group ever since. At the same time, Anastasio welcomed back Russ Remington and introduced Natalie Cressman, whose father Jeff was a member of TAB in 2006 and 2007. Remington left TAB at the end of 2011 and was replaced by James Casey in 2012. Cressman remains in TAB to this day.

== 2021 and onward ==
Markellis died on April 29, 2021. Later, bassist Dezron Douglas was announced as the band’s new bass player. In September 2021, James Casey announced he had cancer and would not be taking part in the fall tour. Cochemea Gastelum filled James’ role in the group during the tour. During TAB's 2021 fall tour, both Hartswick and Lawton tested positive for COVID-19, leaving a stripped-down lineup with no horn section and Phish drummer Jon Fishman taking over for Lawton. In 2022, the band resumed touring with its standard lineup including Casey, Lawton and the horn section. Casey died of colon cancer on August 28, 2023, at the age of 40.. The tenor saxophone player is now Kenneth Whalum.

== Album appearances and discography ==
=== Studio albums ===
The Trey Anastasio Band appears on the following Anastasio solo albums:

- Trey Anastasio (2002)
- The Horseshoe Curve (2007)
- Traveler (2012)
- Paper Wheels (2015)

=== Live albums ===
- Plasma (2003)
- Trey Anastasio with Special Guest Carlos Santana (2004)
- Live in New York City 12-31-05 (2006)
- The Lucius Beebe EP (2007)
- Original Boardwalk Style (2008)
- TAB at the Tab (2010)
- TAB at the Fox Theater (2019)
- Burn It Down (2020)
