= Original Boardwalk Style =

Live album by Trey Anastasio
- Released: June 10, 2008 (US)
- Recorded: December 30 and 31, 2006, Atlantic City, New Jersey
- Genre: Rock
- Label: Rubber Jungle Records

Trey Anastasio chronology
The Lucius Beebe EP (2007)	Original Boardwalk Style (2008)	Time Turns Elastic (2009)

Original Boardwalk Style is a live album from Trey Anastasio and the Undectet, released on June 10, 2008, on Anastasio's own Rubber Jungle Records. It was recorded live on December 30 and 31, 2006, at the House of Blues in Atlantic City, New Jersey. These two shows were recorded shortly after Anastasio was arrested for drug possession earlier that month and were his final concerts before he began a drug rehabilitation program; Anastasio made a reference to the arrest during the song "Makisupa Policeman" during the December 31 show, but that song does not appear on the album.

Proceeds from the sale of the album benefit the Seven Below Arts Initiative, established by Anastasio in 2006 to foster artistic development and support arts education in the state of Vermont.

== Track listing ==
1. "Drifting" (Anastasio, Lawton, Markellis) - 7:11
2. "Plasma" (Anastasio, Herman, Marshall) - 11:51
3. "Shine" (Anastasio, O'Brien) - 6:55
4. "Alive Again" (Anastasio, Herman, Marshall) - 8:06
5. "Mud City" (Anastasio) - 7:42
6. "Simple Twist Up Dave" (Anastasio, Herman, Marshall) - 8:13
7. "Tuesday" (Anastasio) - 5:33
8. "Money, Love and Change" (Anastasio, Marshall) - 14:00
9. "Mr. Completely" (Anastasio) - 8:43
10. "First Tube" (Anastasio, Lawton, Markellis) - 8:41

Track 10 is only available when the album is purchased from Live Phish.com.

== Personnel ==
- Trey Anastasio - guitar, vocals
- Peter Apfelbaum - saxophone, flute
- Cyro Baptista - percussion
- Jeff Cressman - trombone
- Christina Durfee - vocals, synthesizer
- Dave Grippo - saxophone
- Tony Hall - bass, vocals
- Jennifer Hartswick - vocals, trumpet
- Ray Paczkowski - keyboards
- Russell Remington - saxophone, flute
- Jeff Sipe - drums
