= Ghosts of the Forest (album) =

2019 studio album by Ghosts of the Forest

Studio album by Ghosts of the Forest
- Released: April 12, 2019
- Recorded: April 7–8, 2018; Summer 2018
- Studio: The Barn, Vermont; Sputnik Sound, Nashville; Power Station, New York City; Trout Studios, New York City
- Genre: Rock
- Length: 69:19
- Label: Rubber Jungle
- Producer: Trey Anastasio

Ghosts of the Forest chronology
| Paper Wheels (2015) | Ghosts of the Forest (2019) | Lonely Trip (2020) |

Ghosts of the Forest is the debut album by the band of the same name, a side project led by Phish guitarist Trey Anastasio. The album was released on April 12, 2019 on vinyl and streaming services only.

Musicians joining Anastasio on the album include Phish drummer Jon Fishman and Trey Anastasio Band bassist Tony Markellis in his last studio collaboration with Anastasio before his death in 2021.

== Background ==
The "Ghosts of the Forest" name refers to three different entities: the album, which features nine songs, the project as a whole, which features the material on the album plus an additional eleven songs only performed live, and the group itself.

Ghosts of the Forest was partially conceived as a tribute to Anastasio's friend Chris Cottrell, who died of adrenal cancer in January 2018. While the group's live performances share the extended improvisations that define Phish concerts, Ghosts of the Forest's performances differ from Anastasio's other projects in that the group's setlists remained static throughout its run. The Ghosts in the Forest project was also a main focus of the documentary Between Me and My Mind, released the same year.

Anastasio used a stripped-back approach to his playing for the album and employed minimal overdubs, citing Cottrell as an influence for this decision. He stated:

He [Chris] liked it when I ripped it on the guitar. Period. End of sentence. That’s it… So when I made this record after he died I just said that to Fish and Tony, “I’m just going to play a lot of guitar.” There’s no overdub crap for most of it. It’s real.

Nature also plays a central role in the sound of the album, with Anastasio and mixer Vance Powell at one point recording 45 minutes of ambient outside sounds, elements of which were later overlaid onto the album's songs.

All songs on the album except "In Long Lines" have made it into Phish setlists. Additionally, another Ghosts of the Forest song, "A Life Beyond the Dream", appears on their 2020 studio album Sigma Oasis.

== Commercial performance ==
Ghosts of the Forest made the top ten of the Billboard Vinyl Albums chart, reaching number four. It also reached number 67 on the magazine's Top Album Sales chart and number 51 on its Top Current Album Sales chart.

== Track listing ==
All tracks are written by Trey Anastasio.

| No. | Title | Length |
|---|---|---|
| 1. | "Ghosts of the Forest" | 4:59 |
| 2. | "Drift While You're Sleeping" | 10:29 |
| 3. | "Friend" | 6:40 |
| 4. | "About to Run" | 5:20 |
| 5. | "Halfway Home" | 5:23 |
| 6. | "In Long Lines" | 4:52 |
| 7. | "Ruby Waves" | 6:00 |
| 8. | "Brief Time" | 2:06 |
| 9. | "Beneath a Sea of Stars" | 23:30 |
| Total length: | | 69:19 |

== Personnel ==
- Trey Anastasio – guitar, vocals
- Tony Markellis – bass
- Jon Fishman – drums
- Ray Paczkowski – keyboards
- Charlie Lowell – keyboards
- Jeff Tanski – keyboards
- Jason Eskridge – backing vocals
- Kristin Rogers – backing vocals
