= The Horseshoe Curve =

Studio album by Trey Anastasio
- Released: July 24, 2007 (US)
- Recorded: 2002–2006
- Genre: Jazz
- Length: 43:46
- Label: Rubber Jungle Records

Trey Anastasio chronology
Live in New York City 12-31-05 (2006)	The Horseshoe Curve (2007)	The Lucius Beebe EP (2007)

Professional ratings
Review scores
Source	Rating
All About Jazz	(favorable)
Glide Magazine	3.5/5 stars
Music Box	3/5 stars
Rolling Stone	2.5/5 stars
AllMusic	4/5 stars

The Horseshoe Curve is Trey Anastasio's sixth studio album. It was his second release on his record label, Rubber Jungle Records. The Horseshoe Curve is entirely instrumental apart from three cries of "Burlap Sack & Pumps" on track 3 of the same name. This album features the ten-member dectet that toured from 2002 to 2004.

The album was primarily recorded at The Barn, Anastasio's recording studio near Burlington, Vermont, and Trout Recording in Brooklyn, New York. "The 5th Round" and the title track were recorded live during the band's summer 2002 tour.

== Track listing ==
All songs, unless otherwise noted, are written and arranged by Trey Anastasio

1. Sidewalks of San Francisco - 4:06 (Anastasio/Markellis/Lawton)
2. Olivia - 8:22 (Anastasio/Baptista)
3. Burlap Sack & Pumps - 6:58 (Anastasio/Markellis/Lawton/Kevin Hoffman)
4. The 5th Round - 6:19
  - Recorded live 6/21/02, Tweeter Center at the Waterfront, Camden, NJ
  - This track is a portion of the "Money, Love and Change" jam
5. The Horseshoe Curve - 6:20 (Anastasio/Markellis/Lawton)
  - Recorded live 6/11/02, Amphitheatre at Station Square, Pittsburgh, PA
  - This track is a portion of the "Last Tube" jam
6. Noodle Rave - 5:14
7. Tube Top Tony - 3:34
8. Porters Pyramids - 2:53
9. Mozambique - 9:25
  - Studio outtake bonus track available as a digital download from LivePhish.com

== Personnel ==
- Andy Moroz - Trombone
- Cyro Baptista - percussion
- Dave Grippo - alto/baritone saxophone
- Jennifer Hartswick - trumpet
- Peter Apfelbaum - tenor/baritone saxophone
- Russell Remington - tenor saxophone/flute
- Ray Paczkowski - keyboards
- Russ Lawton - drums
- Tony Markellis - bass
- Trey Anastasio - guitar, vocals

== Credits ==
- Recorded and Mixed by Bryce Goggin
- Additional Recording by Paul Languedoc
- Mastered by Fred Kevorkian
- Artwork by Scott Lenhardt
