= Natalie Cressman =

American jazz, funk, and rock trombonist

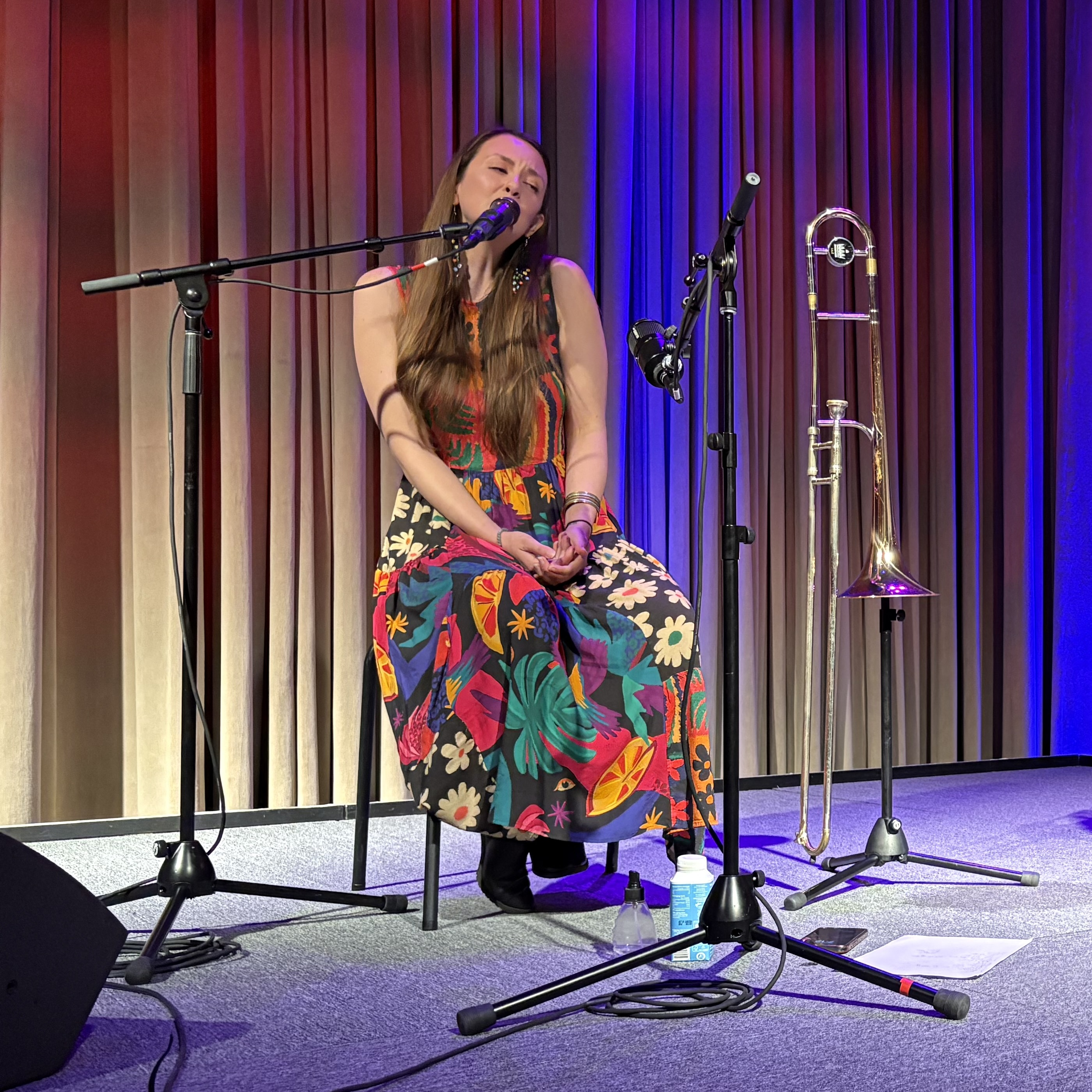

Background information
- Born: 1991 or 1992 (age 34–35); San Francisco, California
- Genres: Jazz, pop, rock
- Occupation: Musician
- Instrument: Trombone
- Years active: 2010–present
- Label: Cressman Music
- Member of: Trey Anastasio Band
- Website: nataliecressman.com

Natalie Cressman is an American jazz trombonist and vocalist.

== Career ==
Cressman was born in San Francisco to jazz musicians Sandy and Jeff Cressman. When her father was part of Carlos Santana's band, she danced onstage with him at Madison Square Garden. In her early teens, she began performing with Afro Cuban, Brazilian, and jazz bands. Cressman graduated from San Francisco's Ruth Asawa School of the Arts. At the age of eighteen she moved to New York City to attend the Manhattan School of Music, where she studied with Luis Bonilla, Garry Dial, Laurie Frink, and Wycliffe Gordon. She joined a band led by Trey Anastasio. She performed with Nicholas Payton's Television Symphony Orchestra and Peter Apfelbaum's New York Hieroglyphics Ensemble. In 2012, she played at the Apollo Theater as a soloist in Wycliffe Gordon's Jazz a la Carte. She founded the band Secret Garden. She has appeared with the bands Dumpstaphunk and Lettuce, and has been an artist at large at Bear Creek Music Festival.

== Discography ==
Solo

- Turn the Sea (2014)
- The Traces (EP; 2017)

With Ian Faquini

- Setting Rays of Summer (2019)
- Auburn Whisper (2022)
- GUINGA (2023)
- An Old Fashioned Christmas (EP; 2023)
- Revolução (2025)
- Brazilian Nutcracker (EP; 2025)
