= Tuesday (Trey Anastasio song) =

Single by Trey Anastasio

from the album Shine
- Released: November 1, 2005
- Genre: Indie rock, power pop
- Length: 3:43
- Label: Columbia
- Songwriter: Trey Anastasio
- Producer: Brendan O'Brien

Trey Anastasio singles chronology
| "Shine" (2005) | "Tuesday" (2005) |

"Tuesday" is a song by Trey Anastasio and the second track on his 2005 album Shine. It was recorded in mid-2005 at the Southern Tracks Recording Studio in Atlanta, GA. It was debuted live on July 24, 2005 at the 10,000 Lakes Festival in Detroit Lakes, Minnesota.

== Personnel ==
- Guitar, Vocals - Trey Anastasio
- Bass, Keyboards, Drums, Backing Vocals - Brendan O'Brien
- Percussion - Cyro Baptista
- Cover Photos - Phil Knott
