= Trey Anastasio (album) =

Studio album by Trey Anastasio
- Released: April 30, 2002 (US)
- Recorded: June–December 2001
- Genres: Jam rock, prog-rock, jazz rock, experimental rock
- Length: 59:14
- Label: Elektra
- Producers: Trey Anastasio, Bryce Goggin

Trey Anastasio chronology
| Trampled By Lambs and Pecked by the Dove (2000) | Trey Anastasio (2002) | Plasma (2003) |

Trey Anastasio is an album by the guitarist and composer Trey Anastasio. It was released on April 30, 2002, by Elektra Records and recorded at "The Barn", his studio near Westford, Vermont. Some of the songs included are evolved, but much less experimental, versions of tracks on Anastasio's first solo album, One Man's Trash, released in 1998. The tracks included were written by Anastasio, along with Tom Marshall, Tony Markellis, Russ Lawton and Scott Herman.

Professional ratings
Review scores
| Source | Rating |
|---|---|
| AMG | link |
| Rolling Stone | link |

== Track listing ==
1. "Alive Again" - 4:39
2. "Cayman Review" - 4:16
3. "Push On 'Til the Day" - 7:37
4. "Night Speaks to a Woman" - 4:01
5. "Flock of Words" - 4:32
6. "Money, Love and Change" - 4:07
7. "Drifting" - 3:43
8. "At the Gazebo" - 3:11
9. "Mister Completely" - 4:35
10. "Ray Dawn Balloon" - 3:29
11. "Last Tube" - 11:22
12. "Ether Sunday" - 3:40

== Personnel ==
- Guitar, vocals – Trey Anastasio
- Bass guitar, vocals – Tony Markellis
- Drums, vocals – Russ Lawton
- Trumpet, vocals – Jennifer Hartswick
- Keyboards – Ray Paczkowski
- Tenor saxophone, flute – Russell Remmington
- Alto/baritone saxophone – Dave Grippo
- Trombone – Andy Moroz
- Percussion – Cyro Baptista

=== Additional musicians ===
- Saxophone – Dana Colley
- Trombone – Rob Volo
- Trumpet – Nicholas Payton
- Vocals – Curtis King Jr.
- Vocals – Lisa Fischer
- Violin – David Gusacov
- Violin - Laura Markowitz
- Viola – Ana Ruesink
- Double bass – Mike Hopkins
- Cello – John Dunlop
- Flute – Stacey Brubaker
- Flute – Karen Kevra
- Oboe, English horn – Ann Greenawalt
- Clarinet, bass clarinet – Steve Klimowski
- Bass clarinet – Craig Olzenak
- Bassoon – Margaret Phillips
- French horn – Shelagh Abate
- French horn – Jocelyn Crawford
- Timpani – Peter Wilson
- Marimba - Tom Toner
