= Shine (Trey Anastasio song) =

Single by Trey Anastasio

from the album Shine
- Released: October 11, 2005
- Genre: Alternative rock
- Length: 3:08
- Label: Columbia
- Songwriter(s): Trey Anastasio, Brendan O'Brien
- Producer(s): Brendan O'Brien

Trey Anastasio singles chronology
"Shine" (2005)	"Tuesday" (2005)

"Shine" is a song by American musician Trey Anastasio. It was released on October 11, 2005 as a single from the album of the same name. Credited to both Trey Anastasio and Brendan O'Brien, it was recorded in mid-2005 at the Southern Tracks Recording Studio in Atlanta, Georgia. Anastasio admits that "Shine" was written after all of the other tracks on the album, as a way to "tie it all together." It was debuted live on July 24, 2005, at the 10,000 Lakes Festival in Detroit Lakes, Minnesota.

"Shine" was Anastasio's most successful solo single on the Billboard Adult Alternative Songs chart, where it reached #4 in December 2005.

== Personnel ==
- Guitar, vocals - Trey Anastasio
- Drums - Kenny Aronoff
- Bass, keyboards, backing vocals - Brendan O'Brien
- Percussion - Cyro Baptista
- Cover photos - Phil Knott
