= Joy (Phish album) =

Album by Phish

Studio album by Phish
- Released: September 8, 2009
- Recorded: April–May 2009
- Studio: Chung King Studios (New York City)
- Length: 53:30
- Label: JEMP
- Producer: Steve Lillywhite

Phish chronology
At the Roxy (2008)	Joy (2009)	Hampton/Winston-Salem '97 (2011)

Singles from Joy
- 1. "Time Turns Elastic" Released: May 26, 2009; 2. "Backwards Down The Number Line" Released: August 7, 2009

Professional ratings
Review scores
Source	Rating
Allmusic	3/5 stars
Billboard	(83/100)
PopMatters	4/10 stars
Rolling Stone	4/5 stars

Joy is the twelfth studio album by the American rock band Phish, released on September 8, 2009, on the band's own label, JEMP Records.

Joy was Phish's first studio album since Undermind in 2004, and their first since they reunited in March 2009. The sessions also reunited the band with producer Steve Lillywhite, who last worked with Phish on their 1996 release, Billy Breathes. The album's second single, "Backwards Down the Number Line", was successful on Billboard's Adult Alternative Songs chart, reaching a peak of #9 in October 2009.

== Contents ==
The first single, "Time Turns Elastic"—originally a multi-movement work for strings, guitar and vocals released as an album earlier in the year by Anastasio—was released for iTunes-only download on May 26, 2009. The album's second single, "Backwards Down The Number Line", was released on iTunes and began radio rotation on August 17, 2009.

Amazon.com released an exclusive live version of "Backwards Down the Number Line", recorded at Red Rocks during the band's summer tour, as a download-only bonus track.

All ten songs were performed live during the band's 2009 summer tour, and have been generally well received by fans. However, "Time Turns Elastic" has been criticized as being too overly composed for ready translation to the live stage,.

== Reception ==
Joy received generally favorable reviews upon its release, with a 65/100 critic score on Metacritic, based on nine reviews. The New York Times commented that "Steve Lillywhite’s clear and ungimmicky production makes Joy sound like the band members onstage responding to one another," while Billboard simply stated "Joy is a journey not to be missed."

Many critics also made reference to the band's enthusiasm, with Rolling Stone commenting that "what's most impressive here is how much they seem to be enjoying themselves—truly, deeply, gratefully." Noting that 2009 marked the band's 25th anniversary together, Rolling Stone described Joy's songs as something akin to "a belated birthday party" characterized by nostalgic, reflective lyrics that appear to be influenced by guitarist Trey Anastasio's struggle with drug abuse during the intervening years. Rolling Stone praised the album as "genuinely great" and "a deeper trip than most Phish LPs".

== Track listing ==
Joy
No.	Title	Writer(s)	Lead vocals	Length
1.	"Backwards Down the Number Line"	Trey Anastasio; Tom Marshall	Anastasio	5:37
2.	"Stealing Time from the Faulty Plan"	Anastasio; Marshall; Scott Herman	Anastasio	4:40
3.	"Joy"	Anastasio; Marshall	Anastasio	4:24
4.	"Sugar Shack"	Mike Gordon	Gordon	4:04
5.	"Ocelot"	Anastasio; Marshall	Anastasio	3:36
6.	"Kill Devil Falls"	Anastasio; Marshall	Anastasio	5:29
7.	"Light"	Anastasio; Marshall	Anastasio	5:04
8.	"I Been Around"	Page McConnell	McConnell	1:57
9.	"Time Turns Elastic"	Anastasio	Anastasio	13:30
10.	"Twenty Years Later"	Anastasio; Marshall	Anastasio (with: Jon Fishman; Gordon; McConnell)	5:09
Total length:				53:30

== Party Time ==
Party Time

Studio album by Phish
- Recorded: March 3, 1998–June 9, 2009
- Genre: Rock
- Length: 50:30
- Label: JEMP
- Producer: Steve Lillywhite

It was announced on August 10, 2009, that Joy would be made available for pre-order in several different formats, including CD, vinyl and the "Joy Box" which, in addition to the Joy CD, "will include ten individual Limited Edition posters designed for each of the album’s 10 songs, a complete second album titled Party Time, and a DVD capturing live performances from the first half of Phish’s summer 2009 tour—including footage from the 2009 Bonnaroo Music & Arts Festival and the tour’s opening date at Fenway Park in Boston."

A limited edition vinyl was also released at Superball IX, Phish's 2011 summer festival. Party Time is available as a LivePhish download, but has not yet been made available for stand-alone purchase as a physical CD.

=== Background ===
Some of the songs on Party Time have become a part of Phish's live rotation, with "Alaska" and the title track appearing frequently, as well as appearances of "Windy City", "Gone", "The Birdwatcher", and "Let Me Lie". "Liquid Time" was soundchecked at Festival 8 in Indio, CA. Mike Gordon has played "Only A Dream" regularly with his solo band, and Trey Anastasio has played "Gone" and "Liquid Time" with his solo outfit. "Let Me Lie" also appeared (in a different version) on Anastasio's 2006 solo album Bar 17 and was recorded a third time on his 2012 album Traveler. Furthermore, a re-recording of "Liquid Time" appears on his 2015 album Paper Wheels.

"In a Misty Glade" and "Shrine", both of which feature a rare lead vocal from Fishman, were recorded in March 1998, 11 years before the release of the album. The recording of "The Birdwatcher" on Party Time dates back to 2004.

=== Track listing ===
Party Time
No.	Title	Writer(s)	Lead vocals	Length
1.	"Party Time"	Jon Fishman	Anastasio	2:42
2.	"Alaska"	Trey Anastasio; Tom Marshall	Anastasio	7:16
3.	"Windy City"	Page McConnell	McConnell	5:15
4.	"In a Misty Glade"	Anastasio; Marshall	Fishman	2:54
5.	"Gone"	Anastasio	Anastasio	4:09
6.	"Only a Dream"	Mike Gordon	Gordon	4:10
7.	"The Birdwatcher"	Anastasio; Marshall	Anastasio; Fishman; Gordon; McConnell	2:16
8.	"Let Me Lie"	Anastasio; Marshall	Anastasio	3:57
9.	"If I Told You"	McConnell	McConnell	3:53
10.	"Splinters of Hail"	Anastasio	Anastasio	3:33
11.	"Can’t Come Back"	Gordon	Gordon	4:38
12.	"Shrine"	Anastasio; Marshall; Scott Herman	Fishman	1:54
13.	"Liquid Time"	Anastasio	Anastasio	3:53
Total length:				50:30

== Personnel ==
Phish

- Trey Anastasio – guitars, lead vocals, backing vocals, co-lead vocals ("The Birdwatcher")
- Page McConnell – keyboards, backing vocals, lead vocals ("I Been Around", "Windy City", "If I Told You"), co-lead vocals ("Twenty Years Later", "The Birdwatcher")
- Mike Gordon – bass guitar, backing vocals, lead vocals ("Sugar Shack", "Only a Dream", "Can't Come Back"), co-lead vocals ("Twenty Years Later", "The Birdwatcher")
- Jon Fishman – drums, backing vocals, lead vocals ("In a Misty Glade", "Shrine"), co-lead vocals ("Twenty Years Later", "The Birdwatcher")

Production

- Produced by Steve Lillywhite
- Engineered by CJ Eiriksson
- Mixed by Steve Lillywhite & CJ Eiriksson
- Assisted by Jesse Gladstone
- Additional engineering on "Ocelot" by Ben Collette
- Mastered by Gavin Lurssen
