= Time Turns Elastic =

Studio album by Trey Anastasio and Don Hart
- Released: May 12, 2009 (US)
- Recorded: August – November 2008
- Genre: Classical, progressive rock
- Length: 42:34
- Label: Rubber Jungle Records

Trey Anastasio and Don Hart chronology
The Horseshoe Curve (2007)	Time Turns Elastic (2009)	Traveler (2012)

Professional ratings
Review scores
Source	Rating
AllMusic	3.5/5 stars

Time Turns Elastic is an album by Trey Anastasio consisting mainly of his work by the same name for orchestra, electric guitar, and vocals. Written with composer and arranger Don Hart, it was recorded in the autumn of 2008 by Anastasio, Hart, and the Northwest Sinfonia. The album also features a solo demo version performed by Anastasio on acoustic guitar.

Anastasio began writing the piece in 2006 in preparation for a potential Phish reunion, which was announced in October 2008. Days before the reunion announcement, Anastasio debuted “Time Turns Elastic” with Don Hart and Orchestra Nashville at the Ryman Auditorium on September 28, 2008. Anastasio performed the piece again in May 2009 with Marin Alsop and the Baltimore Symphony Orchestra. Trey also performed the piece with the New York Philharmonic at Carnegie Hall in September 2009.

Phish recorded a version of “Time Turns Elastic” as the first single from their reunion album Joy released in September 2009 and debuted their version in concert on May 31, 2009 at Fenway Park in Boston. The track, clocking in at 13:30, contains a diverse array of time signatures including 4/4, 5/4 and 11/4.

== Track listing ==
1. Time Turns Elastic – 29:05 (Anastasio/Hart)
  1. Song at Dawn 5:03
  2. Ruby Shaded Sea 4:35
  3. Submarine 3:23
  4. Landslide 3:58
  5. Rays of Blue Light 3:01
  6. Silver Sound Shower 3:57
  7. Hailstorm 1:40
  8. Funnels 1:02
  9. Carousel 2:26
2. Time Turns Elastic (Original Acoustic Demo) – 13:29 (Anastasio)

== Credits ==
- Performed Trey Anastasio, Don Hart, and the Northwest Sinfonia
- Recorded and Mixed by Brian Montgomery and John Siket
- Engineered by Roy Hendrickson
- Mastered by Bob Ludwig
- Conducted by Paul Gambill
