= 18 Steps =

EP by Trey Anastasio
- Released: October 3, 2006 (US)
- Recorded: 2003–2006
- Genre: Rock
- Label: Rubber Jungle Records
- Producers: Bryce Goggin and Trey Anastasio

Trey Anastasio chronology
Bar 17 (2006)	18 Steps (2006)	Live in New York City 12-31-05 (2006)

18 Steps is an EP by rock artist Trey Anastasio. It was released in 2006 on Rubber Jungle Records. It was included as a bonus with pre-orders of Bar 17 from his official website. The disc contains nine new songs, which are outtakes from Bar 17. Like the tracks on Bar 17, the tunes featured on 18 Steps were recorded over roughly a three-year period, from the spring of 2003 to the summer of 2006. 18 Steps can be found in select independent record stores, online auctions, and is still available for download via LivePhish.

== Album cover ==
David Steinberg (aka "Zzyzx") contributed the mathematical expression for the cover. He briefly explains it on Tom Marshall's podcast episode 4, and mentions it includes Stirling numbers, phi, and the sum of a convergent series to form something like 17 + 2 - ... = 18 steps.

== Track listing ==
All tracks are written by Trey Anastasio, except where noted.

No.	Title	Length
1.	"Home" (Anastasio, Marshall)	2:54
2.	"Dark and Down"	5:12
3.	"18 Steps"	6:54
4.	"In Spirals"	2:54
5.	"Discern" (Anastasio, Herman, Marshall)	5:41
6.	"Low"	3:28
7.	"Words to Wanda" (Anastasio, Marshall)	5:03
8.	"Agnes"	2:00
9.	"Rose Alone"	4:01
