= Live in New York City 12-31-05 =

EP by Trey Anastasio
- Released: 2006 (US)
- Recorded: December 31, 2005, Madison Square Garden, New York City
- Genre: Rock
- Label: Rubber Jungle Records
- Producer: Trey Anastasio

Trey Anastasio chronology
18 Steps (2006)	Live in New York City 12-31-05 (2006)	The Horseshoe Curve (2007)

Live in New York City 12-31-05 is an EP by Trey Anastasio that was bundled with select CD copies of Shine at Tower Records during 2006. The disc features tracks from a live concert at Madison Square Garden in New York City on New Year's Eve 2005, where Anastasio and his band opened for The Black Crowes.

== Track listing ==
1. Sand - 11:03
2. Tuesday - 7:22
3. Plasma - 5:11
4. Money, Love and Change - 20:33
5. Come As Melody - 6:55
