= The Lucius Beebe EP =

EP by Trey Anastasio
- Released: July 24, 2007 (US)
- Recorded: 2002–2004
- Genre: Afro-Cuban
- Label: Rubber Jungle Records
- Producer: Bryce Goggin and Trey Anastasio

Trey Anastasio chronology
The Horseshoe Curve (2007)	The Lucius Beebe EP (2007)	Original Boardwalk Style (2008)

Professional ratings
Review scores
Source	Rating
All About Jazz	(favorable) link

The Lucius Beebe EP is a 5-song live mini-album by Trey Anastasio available free to customers who pre-ordered the album The Horseshoe Curve from Anastasio's website (www.trey.com). The EP features live versions of three songs from The Horseshoe Curve and two songs from Anastasio's 2004 classical release Seis De Mayo along with special guest appearances by Phish drummer Jon Fishman and jazz keyboardist John Medeski.

== Track listing ==
1. Burlap Sack and Pumps - 13:40 (Anastasio/Hoffman/Lawton/Markellis)
  - Recorded live 7/21/01, Alpine Valley Music Theatre, East Troy, WI
2. Coming To - 5:29 (Anastasio)
  - Recorded live 6/13/04, Bonnaroo Music Festival, Manchester, TN
3. Andre the Giant - 3:47 (Anastasio)
  - Recorded live 7/18/01, Red Rocks Amphitheatre, Morrison, CO
4. Sidewalks of San Francisco - 12:13 (Anastasio/Lawton/Markellis)
  - Recorded live 7/28/01, Merriweather Post Pavilion, Columbia, MD
5. Noodle Rave - 9:04 (Anastasio)
  - Recorded live 6/16/02, Darien Lake Performing Arts Center, Darien, NY
  - Hidden track at 8:15: Dig It (Lennon/McCartney/Harrison/Starr)
