= 70 Volt Parade =

US musical group

Trey Anastasio and 70 Volt Parade
- Origin: United States
- Genres: Rock, Jam band
- Years active: 2005
- Label: Columbia Records
- Past members: Trey Anastasio; Tony Hall; Les Hall; Ray Paczkowski; Jennifer Hartswick; Christina Durfee; Peter Chwazik; Skeeto Valdez

70 Volt Parade was Trey Anastasio's backing band in 2005, formed after the breakup of Phish in August of the previous year. After writing and recording new material in late 2004 and early 2005, Anastasio began auditioning various musicians for his next project. This band essentially replaced Anastasio's first backup band that was together in different forms from 1999 to 2004. 70 Volt Parade originally included Peter Chwazik on bass (later replaced by Tony Hall), Skeeto Valdez on drums (later replaced by Raymond Weber), Les Hall on guitar and keyboards, and Ray Paczkowski also on keyboards. In 2006, with Les Hall out of the lineup, and a new musical focus for Anastasio, the 70 Volt Parade name was dropped.

== Music ==
While 70 Volt Parade primarily performed new material that Anastasio has written and recorded since the breakup of Phish, the band played songs from all points of Anastasio's solo career, which began in 1998. He also performed the Phish song "46 Days" with the new band on a regular basis, as well as songs from the supergroup Oysterhead. Also, unlike Anastasio's past bands, performances usually have an opening act. Anastasio and 70 Volt Parade have also served as an opening act for The Rolling Stones and The Black Crowes. One of the highlights of the band's inaugural tour was the "Superjam" in New Orleans on April 30, 2005, which included special guests Mike Gordon, Dave Matthews, Cyril Neville and Sunpie Barnes, among others. Starting with the August 6, 2005 concert at Tommy Hilfiger at Jones Beach Theater, shows featured Anastasio performing a solo acoustic set in the middle or end of each concert, instead of a traditional set break. Most of the songs performed during these sets were from the Phish catalog. During the band's fall tour, the other three members of Phish each made a guest appearance. Page McConnell played with Anastasio at the Roseland Ballroom in New York City. Mike Gordon joined Trey onstage at the Hammerstein Ballroom in New York City. Jon Fishman and Gordon later performed at a show in Utica, New York that was heavily promoted on Anastasio's website. McConnell and Fishman's appearances marked the first time either musician had performed with Anastasio in front of a live audience since Coventry.

== Zooma Tour Cancellation ==
In the summer of 2005, Anastasio and 70 Volt Parade were scheduled to co-headline the festival-like Zooma Tour along with Ben Harper and the Innocent Criminals. The tour, which featured an intensive schedule covering venues throughout the United States, was cancelled due to poor ticket sales. Anastasio then scheduled a brief summer tour in its place.

== Lineup Changes ==
1. On July 24, 2005, at the 10,000 Lakes Festival, Tony Hall replaced Peter Chwazik on bass. Hall (no relation to guitarist Les Hall) had recently played with Trey as a member of Dave Matthews and Friends. Also, two backup singers were added, Jennifer Hartswick, from Anastasio's previous band and her childhood friend, Christina Durfee.
2. On November 18, 2005, Raymond Weber replaced Skeeto Valdez on drums. Both Weber and Tony Hall are members of Ivan Neville's Dumpstaphunk, a New Orleans funk outfit in the Neville tradition.
3. Also on the fall tour, the two female singers began playing horns on selected songs (Jen on trumpet and tuba and Christina on trombone). Hartswick had played trumpet and tuba, as well as sung in Anastasio's old band.
4. The band also added Russell Remington, also from Trey's old band (and who performed with Phish on many occasions as a member of The Giant Country Horns) on saxophone and flute.

== Record Label ==
Trey Anastasio's 2005 release, Shine, marked the first release by Anastasio since the formation of the 70 Volt Parade. Although the group does not perform on the album, they appeared in the video for the album's title track, as well as on the bonus features on the video side of the album's Dual Disc. The album, unlike its predecessors by Trey Anastasio & Phish, was released on Columbia Records. The switch of labels for Anastasio led to a delay in digital recordings of 2005 shows being available for sale on the Live Phish website.
