= Vermont Youth Orchestra with Trey Anastasio & Ernie Stires =

Live album by Trey Anastasio, Vermont Youth Orchestra, Ernie Stires
- Released: Summer 2001
- Recorded: February 4, 2001, Flynn Theater, Burlington, VT
- Genre: Classical
- Length: 55 minutes
- Producer: Dionysian Productions

Vermont Youth Orchestra with Trey Anastasio and Ernie Stires is a live concert video featuring a performance by the Vermont Youth Orchestra led by conductor Troy Peters along with Phish leader Trey Anastasio and his mentor Ernie Stires. Anastasio studied composition and arranging under Stires while he was a student at Goddard College in Vermont. The concert is divided into four movements featuring compositions written and arranged by Anastasio and Stires.

The concert's centerpiece is a performance of the Phish song "Guyute," which also contains elements of another Phish song, "My Friend, My Friend." The previous night's performance of "Guyute" from February 3, 2001, in Troy, New York, was eventually released on the Phish tribute album Sharin' in the Groove.

The concert was only released on VHS videotape and is currently out of print.

== Track listing ==
1. Chat Rooms

The Blue Room

The Green Room

The Red Room

Trey Anastasio, guitar

2. Samson Riffs

Samson Riff

Samson Variation

Samson Counterpoint

Trey Anastasio, guitar

Ernie Stires, piano

3. Guyute

The Vermont Youth Orchestra conducted by Troy Peters

4. The Inlaw Josie Wales

Trey Anastasio, guitar

Adriane Post, violin

Jane Kittredge, violin

Anja Jokela, viola

Indigo Ruth-Davis, cello
