= Michael Jerling =

American acoustic folk singer-songwriter

Michael Jerling is an American acoustic folk singer-songwriter. He was born in Illinois and attended college at the University of Wisconsin-Eau Claire. His association with Fast Folk Musical Magazine in New York's Greenwich Village led to his song, "Long Black Wall", being included in a Smithsonian Folkways CD celebrating twenty years of Fast Folk. Jerling has won several awards for his music including winning the prestigious Kerrville Folk Festival's "New Folk" competition. Jerling recorded two albums on the Shanachie label, and two on Waterbug Records. He currently records on his own label Fool's Hill Music. He has collaborated with several musicians including Bob Warren, Tony Markellis, and Teresina Huxtable and recorded and produced albums for Lorne Clarke, Mike Quick, Huxtable, Christensen & Hood, Mark Tolstrup and Mallory O'Donnell.

Jerling resides in Saratoga Springs, New York, and has close ties to the historic Caffe Lena. He continues to perform his original songs on six and 12 string guitar, mandolin and harmonica.

== Discography ==
- On Top of Fool's Hill (1979)
- Blue Heartland (1985)
- My Evil Twin (1992)
- New Suit of Clothes (1994)
- In Another Life (1997)
- Early Jerling (1998)
- Little Movies (2002)
- Crooked Path (2007)
- Music Here Tonight (2009)
- Halfway Home (2014)
- Family Recipe (2018)
