= Traveler (Trey Anastasio album) =

Studio album by Trey Anastasio
- Released: October 16, 2012 (US)
- Genre: Rock
- Length: 49:39
- Label: Rubber Jungle Records

Trey Anastasio chronology
Time Turns Elastic (2009)	Traveler (2012)	Paper Wheels (2015)

Traveler is an album by Trey Anastasio released on October 16, 2012.

== Track listing ==
No.	Title	Length
1.	"Corona"	3:34
2.	"Let Me Lie"	3:23
3.	"Frost"	3:56
4.	"Land of Nod"	3:32
5.	"Pigtail"	3:55
6.	"Scabbard"	6:01
7.	"Clint Eastwood"	3:44
8.	"Architect"	4:04
9.	"Valentine"	6:14
10.	"Traveler"	6:36
11.	"Greyhound Rising"	4:40

Let Me Lie appears on Anastasio's 2006 album Bar 17 as well as Phish's 2009 album Party Time, a complete, complementary album released with Joy in a boxed set.

Members of The National, who have worked closely with album producer Peter Katis, also contributed to the record. Clint Eastwood is a cover of the Gorillaz song of the same name.

== Commercial reception ==
The album debuted at No. 51 on the Billboard 200 albums chart on its release, selling around 7,000 copies in the United States in its first week. It also debuted at No. 22 on Billboard's Top Rock Albums, and No. 16 on the Alternative Albums chart. The album has sold 18,000 copies in the United States as of September 2015.

== Credits ==
- Produced by Peter Katis and Trey Anastasio
- Recorded and mixed by Peter Katis at Tarquin Studios
