= James Casey (musician) =

American musician (1983–2023)

- Born: February 4, 1983; Takoma Park, Maryland, U.S.
- Died: August 28, 2023 (aged 40) New York City, New York, U.S.
- Genres: Funk, jam band, Rock
- Occupations: Musician, saxophonist, vocalist, songwriter, producer
- Instruments: Saxophone, baritone saxophone, vocals
- Years active: 2009–2023
- Formerly of: Soulive, Lettuce. Trey Anastasio Band, Meghan Trainor, Billy & The Kids, Phil Lesh & Friends

James Casey (1983–2023) was an American saxophonist, composer, producer, and vocalist. He is best known as the saxophonist for Trey Anastasio Band, Soulive, and Lettuce. Casey also performed with Meghan Trainor, Phil Lesh, and Bill Kreutzmann. He suffered from colon cancer, and died of it after two years, aged 40, in 2023. Casey was an advocate for early colon cancer screening and worked with The Colorectal Cancer Alliance to raise awareness leading to being interviewed on The Today Show in March 2023.

== Early life ==
James Casey was born in metro Washington, D.C. Casey’s musical journey began in Phoenix, Arizona. He started playing drums at the age of 3, and by 9, he had embraced the saxophone. After graduating from Desert Vista High School, he attended Berklee College of Music in Boston, where he pursued a degree in music business.

== Career ==
Casey formed in his first band in 2009 with classmate Louis Cato called Six Figures in Brooklyn, NY. By 2010 Casey was the touring saxophonist for Soulive and Lettuce. In 2012 Casey crossed paths with trumpeter Jennifer Hartswick (of TAB) at the Brooklyn Bowl in Brooklyn, N.Y., leading Phish guitarist Trey Anastasio to invite him to join his solo band, forming a notable horn section featuring Casey, Hartswick and trombonist Natalie Cressman. Casey played extensively with TAB until his death. He also appeared numerous times as a member in Grateful Dead offshoots, Phil Lesh and Friends, and Bill Kreutzman's Billy & The Kids. Casey toured with Meghan Trainer in 2016, performing saxophone and back up vocals. Throughout the course of his career he shared the stage with The Roots, Phish, Anderson .Paak, The Jonas Brothers, Maceo Parker, Carly Rae Jepsen, J.Cole, Leslie Odom Jr., Dave Matthews Band, Sabrina Claudio, Chaka Khan, Wu-Tang, John Legend, Roy Hargrove, Shawn Mendes, 5th Harmony, Billy Strings, and Goose. His solo projects included his band Animus Rexx and his virtual concert company, AuxChord.

In 2023, Casey release New Bloom a single from The Kauai Project.

== Illness and death ==
Casey was diagnosed with colon cancer in July 2021. Throughout his treatment he continued to tour extensively and make music. He also became an advocate for colon cancer screening, working with The Colorectal Cancer Alliance to spread awareness as well as nonprofit The Nancy Langhorne Foundation to raise funds for the uninsured to receive free screenings by releasing a charity Christmas EP. In March 2023, in partnership with Olympus Corporation of Americas, James released a mini-documentary titled Music As Medicine: A James Casey Story candidly sharing the implications his diagnosis had on both his outlook and motivation to cement his legacy. He highlights the disproportionate impact the disease has on the Black community and what people can do to reduce their own risks against the disease.

Casey died on the morning of August 28, 2023 at the age of 40. His death was met with an outpouring of grief with public tributes by Trey Anastasio, Billy Strings, Bill Kreutzmann, Phil Lesh, Louis Cato, Oteil Burbridge, Goose, his fellow members of TAB, Dave Matthews, Nigel Hall, and many others.

A memorial concert was held on November 6, 2023 at Brooklyn Bowl in Brooklyn, NY, which raised over $32,000 for the Colorectal Cancer Alliance and Association of Black Gastroenterologists and Hepatologists (ABGH)

== Discography ==
=== James Casey ===
- A Little Something For Everyone (2022)
- The Kauai Project (2023)

=== Featured on ===
- Another City - Brooke Parrott - 2008
- 2014 Forest Hills Drive - J. Cole - 2014
- In Technicolor - Jesse McCartney - 2014
- White Women - Chromeo - 2014
- P.O.C LIVE! - Talib Kweli - 2014
- Good Medicine - Brady Watt - 2015
- Paper Wheels - Trey Anastasio Band - 2015
- Ladies and Gentlemen, Nigel Hall - Nigel Hall - 2015
- Crush - Lettuce - 2015
- Big Boat - Phish - 2016
- Hot Damn - The Shadowboxers - 2017
- Wait - Sabrina Claudio - 2017
- Live in Europe - Melody Gardot - 2018
- Lux Prima - Danger Mouse/Karen O - 2018
- Kiwanuka - Michael Kiwanuka - 2019
- Final Days - Michael Kiwanuka - 2020
