= Plasma (Trey Anastasio album) =

Live album by Trey Anastasio
- Released: April 29, 2003
- Recorded: 2002
- Genre: Free tropical jazz
- Length: 127:06
- Label: Elektra
- Producer: Trey Anastasio; Chris Cottrell; Brad Sands

Trey Anastasio chronology
Trey Anastasio (2002)	Plasma (2003)	Seis De Mayo (2004)

Professional ratings
Review scores
Source	Rating
AllMusic	4/5 stars
Rolling Stone	3/5 stars

Plasma is Trey Anastasio's first live album. The two-disc set features live tracks recorded during Trey's summer and fall tour in 2002 with his dectet, which included a guitar, bass, saxophones, trumpet, trombone, tuba, flute, percussion, keyboards, and drums. Plasma was released on April 29, 2003.

== Track listing ==
Disc one
No.	Title	Writer(s)	Recording date/venue	Length
1.	"Curlew's Call"	Anastasio/Herman/Marshall	October 24, 2002, Portland Exposition Building, Portland, Maine	11:23
2.	"Plasma"	Anastasio/Herman/Marshall	June 9, 2002, Tower City Amphitheatre, Cleveland, Ohio	4:20
3.	"Magilla"	McConnell	November 2, 2002 (soundcheck), Pompano Beach Amphitheatre, Pompano Beach, Florida	3:06
4.	"When"	Anastasio/Marshall	October 24, 2002, Portland Exposition Building, Portland, Maine	4:48
5.	"Mozambique"	Anastasio/Lawton/Markellis	June 11, 2002, Amphitheatre at Station Square, Pittsburgh	10:19
6.	"Every Story Ends in Stone"	Anastasio/Marshall	June 6, 2002, UIC Pavilion, Chicago	8:37
7.	"Small Axe"	Marley	November 1, 2002, the Tabernacle, Atlanta	3:23
8.	"First Tube"	Anastasio/Lawton/Markellis	June 4, 2002, Red Rocks Amphitheatre, Morrison, Colorado	11:28
Total length:				57:24

Disc two
No.	Title	Writer(s)	Recording date/venue	Length
1.	"Night Speaks to a Woman"	Anastasio/Marshall	June 22, 2002, Merriweather Post Pavilion, Columbia, Maryland	22:50
2.	"Simple Twist Up Dave"	Anastasio/Herman/Marshall	November 1, 2002, The Tabernacle, Atlanta, Georgia	8:46
3.	"Inner Tube"	Anastasio	June 6, 2002, UIC Pavilion, Chicago, Illinois	21:56
4.	"Sand"	Anastasio/Lawton/Markellis/Marshall	June 20, 2002, PNC Bank Arts Center, Holmdel, New Jersey	16:10
Total length:				69:42

Note: Disc 2 track 3 ("Inner Tube") is constructed from portions of the "Mr. Completely" and "Money, Love and Change" jams played at the June 6, 2002 show in Chicago.
