= Paul Languedoc =

American audio engineer and luthier

Paul Languedoc is an American audio engineer and luthier who is most closely associated with the rock band Phish.

== Professional career ==
He was the soundman for rock group Phish prior to the band's breakup in 2004. As the band's chief sound engineer and house mixer, he recorded their double-CD A Live One, and all 20 volumes of the Live Phish Series. He also built guitars and basses for Trey Anastasio and Mike Gordon. A luthier by trade, he built his first guitar when he was 18 years old. He later spent four years working for Alan Stack at Time Guitars in Burlington, Vermont, and by the time he had joined Phish in 1986 at age 28, he had built hundreds of instruments. Since then, he has built only for Anastasio and Gordon, and his original designs have given Phish its own unique instrumental identity. Languedoc has a preference for European hardwoods of the types used for building cellos, specializing in inlay work in mother-of-pearl and abalone. Languedoc first worked with Phish on October 15, 1986, at a concert at Hunt's in Burlington, Vermont. He took part in some of the band's earliest tours and remained with the band until their 2004-2009 hiatus. When Phish resumed touring and recording in 2009, Paul Languedoc declined to join them, deciding to retire from the road to focus on his luthier duties. In March 2009, Garry Brown took over the task of soundman for Phish.

Gordon says Languedoc's striking instruments are only one aspect of the many talents he brings to the Phish sound. "We're really lucky to have Paul. He gives us the freedom to do our own thing."

== Languedoc Guitars ==
In 2006, Paul Languedoc started Languedoc Guitars, selling handmade instruments through his web site. The guitars for sale are near replicas of the hollow-body guitar Trey Anastasio of Phish currently plays. The G2 model guitar sold for $10,000 and the G4 model sold for $7500 as recently as 2009. The G2 features two "F" holes and a pair of Seymour Duncan '59 Model humbuckers; and the G4 has a single "F" hole and a Duncan Custom 5 in the bridge position and a '59 in the neck. As recently as February 2020, Languedoc has zero inventory of new guitars for sale, and his wait-list for future new builds remains listed on his website as "full" and "closed" to accepting new names.

By 2021, he is selling a limited supply of brand new custom made guitars for $20,000 with a 25% deposit to begin. For the custom build, the customer can choose body woods, color (if any), binding, and fretboard inlay.
