= Giant Country Horns =

The Giant Country Horns were a group of musicians who joined rock band Phish for 14 concerts during the band's 1991 summer tour. The horn section, named after "Giant Country" White Bread, added new arrangements to classic Phish songs including "Suzy Greenberg", "Stash", "Split Open and Melt" and many other originals and cover songs.

The original trio included Dave Grippo (a music teacher from South Burlington, Vermont) on alto saxophone, Russell Remington on tenor saxophone, and Carl Gerhard on trumpet. Phish guitarist Trey Anastasio frequently announced the lineup using their nicknames: Dave "The Truth" Grippo, Russell "Killer" Remington, and Carl "Gears" Gerhard. This lineup can be heard on Live Phish Volume 19 (July 12, 1991) and on the July 19, 1991, release from the Live Phish Series.

In 1994, a different lineup performed with Phish under the name Cosmic Country Horns for a limited number of shows. In addition to Grippo and Gerhard, this expanded horn section included Joey Somerville Jr. and Michael Ray on trumpet, Chris Peterman on tenor saxophone, Mike Hewitt on baritone saxophone, and Don Glasgo (a professor at Dartmouth College) on trombone. This lineup can be heard on the song "Gumbo" from the platinum selling A Live One double album.

Members of the Giant Country Horns have appeared as special guests at Phish shows several times since 1991, and Grippo and Gerhard have appeared on a number of other Live Phish Series releases.

From 2001–2004, Grippo and Remington recorded and toured with Anastasio as members of his first backing band. In late 2005, Remington joined Anastasio's new backing band a few months after the outfit debuted. Both Remington and Grippo have performed with Anastasio's latest backing band as well.
