= Bar 17 =

Studio album by Trey Anastasio
- Released: October 3, 2006 (United States)
- Recorded: 2003–2006
- Genre: Rock
- Label: Rubber Jungle Records
- Producers: Bryce Goggin and Trey Anastasio

Trey Anastasio chronology
Live in Chicago (2005)	Bar 17 (2006)	18 Steps (2006)

Bar 17 is Trey Anastasio's fifth solo studio album. It was the first release from his newly formed record label, Rubber Jungle Records. Work began on Bar 17 shortly after the breakup of Phish, but had to temporarily suspend the project due to the absence of producer Bryce Goggin. During the long hiatus in the middle of the album's production, Anastasio flew to Atlanta to record his 2005 album Shine, which was very pop-oriented and different from Anastasio's normal musical style. Bar 17 contains songs written over roughly three years by Anastasio, from the spring of 2003 to the spring of 2006.

The album features contributions by a greatly varied cast of musicians including Phish bandmates Mike Gordon and Jon Fishman as well as the Benevento/Russo Duo and John Medeski. The album credits a total of 42 musicians as performing on various tracks. The first single released from the album is Dragonfly, recorded with Mike Gordon and the Benevento/Russo Duo.

Despite Anastasio performing them live, no music videos of any of the tracks were recorded.

Bar 17 was released on October 3, 2006. Pre-orders made on Anastasio's official webstore came with a bonus disc, 18 Steps, which became available to purchase separately on Live Phish's website.

== Track listing ==
1. "Host Across the Potomac" (Anastasio) – 6:05
2. "If You're Walking" (Anastasio) – 5:47
3. "Dragonfly" (Anastasio, Benevento, Gordon, Russo) – 3:52
4. "Bar 17" (Anastasio) – 8:52
5. "Mud City" (Anastasio) – 4:04
6. "Let Me Lie" (Anastasio, Marshall) – 3:15
7. "What’s Done" (Anastasio) – 5:43
8. "Goodbye Head" (Anastasio, Anastasio) – 7:05
9. "A Case of Ice and Snow" (Anastasio, Cruz, Hoffman) – 4:42
10. "Empty House" (Anastasio) – 3:57
11. "Gloomy Sky" (Anastasio) – 5:56
12. "Shadow" (Anastasio) – 5:26
13. "Cincinnati" (Anastasio, Marshall) – 6:31
