= Trey Anastasio with Special Guest Carlos Santana =

Live album by Trey Anastasio/Carlos Santana
- Released: April 1, 2004
- Recorded: May 31, 2003

Recorded live at the Warfield Theater in San Francisco, California on May 31, 2003, this video features the Trey Anastasio Band (TAB) with Carlos Santana sitting in for a number of covers and Anastasio originals. It was released under the name Live at the Warfield. It features the entire second set of the show, with Santana sitting in on every song. Each of the four songs in the second set segued into one another. In addition, a bonus track, "The Way I Feel", was taken from the first set of the show and also includes Santana sitting in. Santana also sat in for the song "Last Tube" during the first set, but that was not included on the DVD.

Highlights include a 27-minute "Mr. Completely" and an experimental version of Duke Ellington's "Caravan." Trey's main band, Phish, covered Caravan frequently between 1990 and 1996, after which time it was dropped from their repertoire. This was the first time that TAB had covered Caravan.

All proceeds from the sale of the DVDs of this show were distributed to the Waterwheel Foundation and the Milagro Foundation.

This show was part of the brief tour TAB did in between Phish's winter and summer tours in 2003. Other guests during this tour included Mike Gordon and Warren Hayes. This show was also one of the few times during this tour that Trey did not perform any solo acoustic songs. For the encore, TAB played "Root Down" by the Beastie Boys for the first time. Santana did not sit in for the song.

In the summer of 1992, Phish was the opening act for Santana and the two often collaborated. In July 1996, Phish was booked as the opening act for Santana for three shows in Europe. Phish's opening set was rained out during the first of these shows, however Phish joined Santana for part of his headlining set later that night. Phish would also come on stage during Santana's set during the subsequent two shows, along with playing their own opening sets. Trey and Phish keyboardist Page Mcconnell sat in with Santana's band in April 1999 in San Francisco. The next time any member of Phish and Santana collaborated was at the TAB show at the Warfield in 2003. This is also the last time they have collaborated.

== Track listing ==
1. Mr. Completely - 27:00
2. John the Revelator - 8:22
3. Night Speaks to a Woman - 12:33
4. Caravan - 4:43
5. The Way I Feel - 3:02
