= Seis De Mayo =

Studio album by Trey Anastasio
- Released: April 6, 2004 (US)
- Recorded: 2000–2003
- Genre: Classical
- Length: 28:51
- Label: Elektra
- Producer: Trey Anastasio

Trey Anastasio chronology
Plasma (2003)	Seis De Mayo (2004)	Shine (2005)

Professional ratings
Review scores
Source	Rating
AllMusic	3/5 stars
Rolling Stone	3/5 stars

Seis De Mayo is an entirely orchestral album by the guitarist and composer Trey Anastasio. It was released on April 6, 2004, by Elektra Records and seems to return to the "musical obscurism" that was evident in his first solo album, One Man's Trash. Seis De Mayo was recorded in between 2000 and 2003, and features many reincarnations of some of Anastasio's older musical compositions, now with classical arrangements, from a string quartet to a full 66-piece orchestra.

== Track listing ==
1. Andre The Giant – 3:42
2. Prologue (Pebbles and Marbles) – 2:40
3. The Inlaw Josie Wales – 3:47
4. All Things Reconsidered – 3:01
5. Coming To – 2:50
6. Discern (intro) – 1:50
7. Guyute (orchestral) – 11:46
