= Paper Wheels =

Studio album by Trey Anastasio
- Released: October 30, 2015
- Recorded: 2014
- Genre: Rock
- Length: 59:03
- Label: Rubber Jungle Records

Trey Anastasio chronology
Traveler (2012)	Paper Wheels (2015)	Ghosts of the Forest (2019)

Paper Wheels is the eleventh studio album by American musician Trey Anastasio. The album was released on October 30, 2015, by Rubber Jungle Records.

== Critical reception ==
Professional ratings
Review scores
Source	Rating
AllMusic	4.5/5 stars
Rolling Stone	3.5/5 stars

Paper Wheels received generally positive reviews from music critics. Stephen Thomas Erlewine of AllMusic wrote, "What Anastasio achieves with Paper Wheels is tricky -- he's made a jam band record with defined hooks and songs that neither dilutes his identity or compromises it -- but he makes it seem easy." Reviewing the album for NPR, critic Tom Moon highlighted its warm, live-in-the-studio feel and cohesive band performances, noting that Paper Wheels draws heavily on early-1970s pop and rock without straight imitation. While he acknowledged occasional lyrical drift and contrived transitions, Moon concluded that the album reflects Anastasio’s growing emphasis on melody and feel over technical display. The album was nominated for a Grammy in 2017 for Best Boxed or Special Limited Edition Package.

== Track listing ==
No.	Title	Length
1.	"Sometime After Sunset"	5:41
2.	"The Song"	3:25
3.	"Never"	6:00
4.	"In Rounds"	5:46
5.	"Flying Machines"	4:06
6.	"Invisible Knife"	4:38
7.	"Lever Boy"	4:00
8.	"Bounce"	5:51
9.	"Liquid Time"	6:17
10.	"Paper Wheels"	4:46
11.	"Speak To Me"	4:32
12.	"Cartwheels"	4:01
