= Ray Paczkowski =

American keyboard musician

Ray Paczkowski is a keyboardist from Burlington, Vermont. He graduated from a Chatham, Massachusetts, high school. A former milkman, Ray is part of the jazz trio Vorcza, but is probably best known for playing in various bands with Phish guitarist Trey Anastasio.

== Bands ==
- Vorcza
- Viperhouse (1996–2000)
- The Octet (2001)
- Trey Anastasio Band (2001–present)
- The Dectet (2002–2004)
- Dave Matthews & Friends (2003–2006)
- 70 Volt Parade (2005)
- Soule Monde (2011–present)
- LaMP (2018–present)
