= Peter Apfelbaum =

American jazz saxophonist and composer (born 1960)

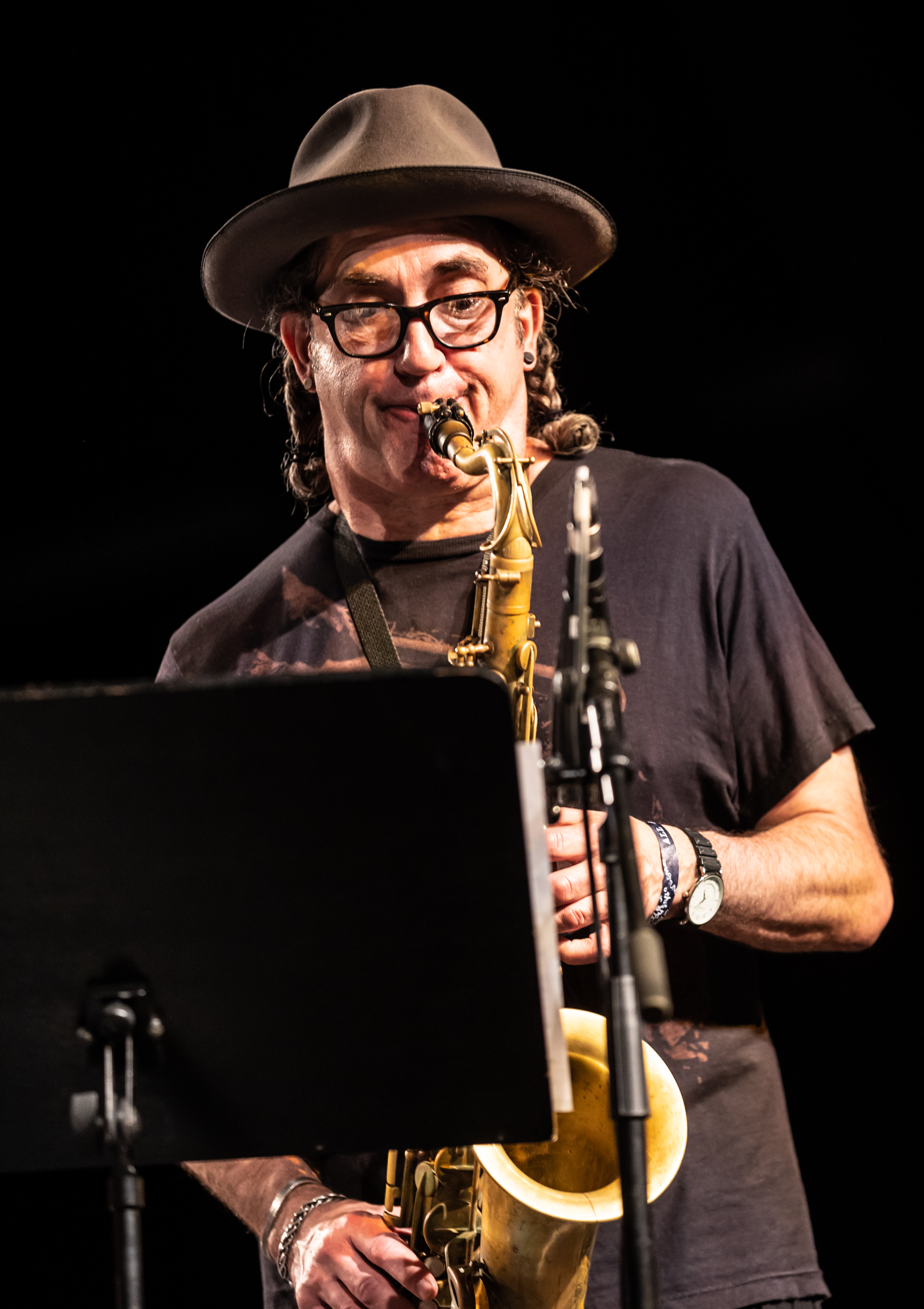
- Apfelbaum at the Moers Festival 2022

Background information
- Born: August 21, 1960 (age 65); Berkeley, California, U.S.
- Genres: Jazz
- Occupation: Musician
- Instruments: Tenor saxophone, piano, keyboards, drums
- Years active: 1970s–present

Peter Noah Apfelbaum (born August 21, 1960) is an American avant-garde jazz pianist, tenor saxophonist, drummer, and composer born in Berkeley, California.

== Career ==
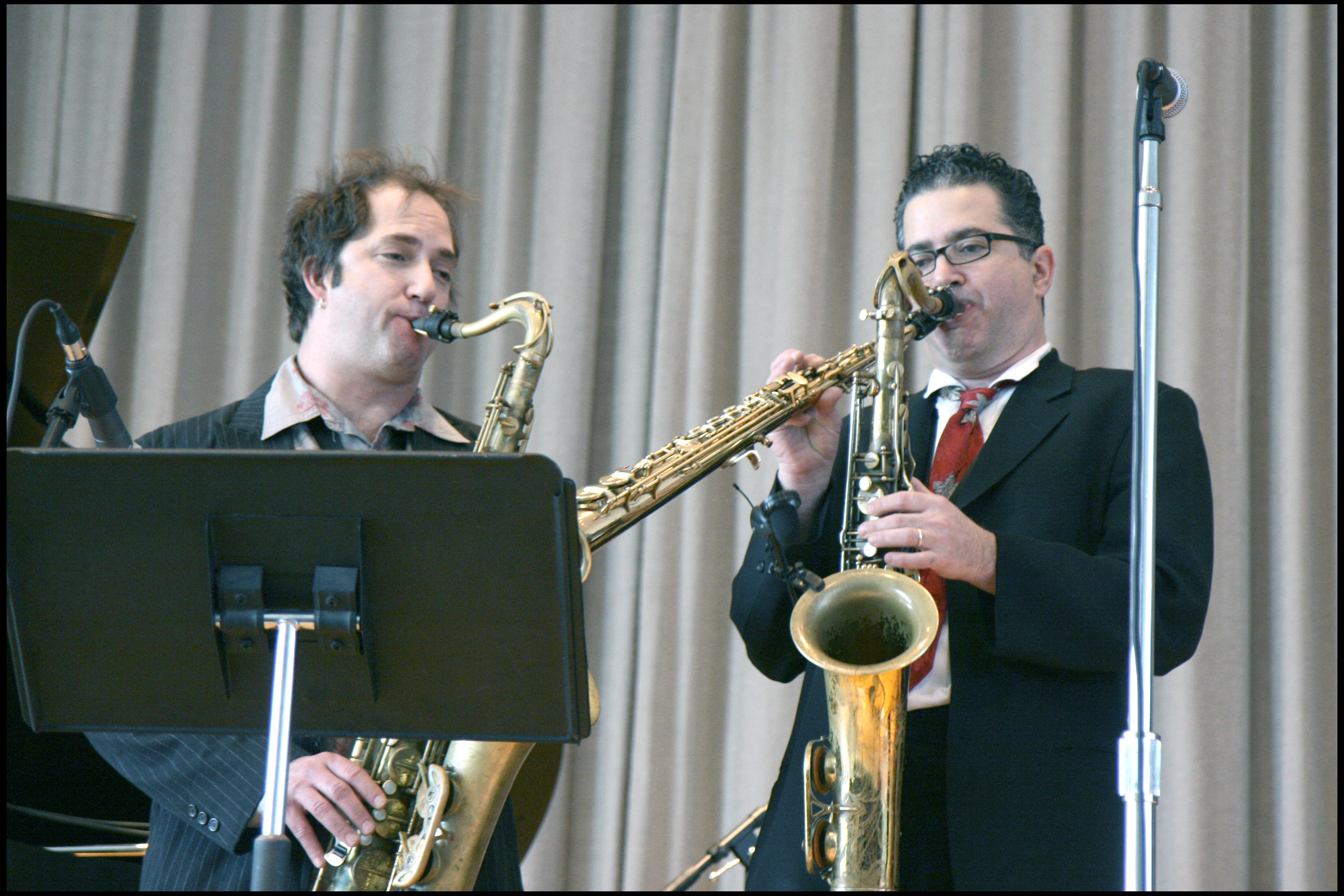
Apfelbaum and Paul Shapiro

Apfelbaum formed the Hieroglyphics Ensemble in 1977. He performed with Carla Bley from 1978 to 1982 and toured with Warren Smith and Karl Berger.

He has composed for the Hieroglyphics Ensemble and for Don Cherry. In 1990, he toured and recorded with Cherry in the band Multikulti, playing piano and saxophone.

Apfelbaum's main instruments are tenor saxophone, piano, and drums. His work is influenced by world music with experimental jazz.

== Discography ==
=== As leader ===
- Pillars (Jewish Matador, 1979)
- Signs of Life (Antilles, 1991)
- Jodoji Brightness (Antilles, 1992)
- Luminous Charms (Gramavision, 1996)
- It Is Written (ACT, 2005)

=== As sideman ===
With Trey Anastasio

- Bar 17 (Rubber Jungle, 2006)
- Plasma (Elektra, 2003)
- Seis De Mayo (Elektra, 2004)
- The Horseshoe Curve (Rubber Jungle, 2007)

With Karl Berger

- Live at the Donaueschingen Music Festival (MPS, 1980)
- New Moon (Palcoscenico, 1980)
- Stillpoint (Double Moon, 2002)

With Steven Bernstein

- Diaspora Soul (Tzadik, 1999)
- MTO Volume 1 (Sunnyside, 2006)
- Diaspora Suite (Tzadik, 2008)
- MTO Plays Sly (Royal Potato Family, 2011)

With Dafnis Prieto

- Taking the Soul for a Walk (Dafnison, 2008)
- Live at Jazz Standard NYC (Dafnison, 2009)
- Triangles and Circles (Dafnison, 2015)
- Back to the Sunset (Dafnison, 2018)

With Jai Uttal

- Beggars and Saints (Triloka, 1994)
- Shiva Station (Triloka, 1997)
- Thunder Love (Nutone, 2009)
- Roots, Rock, Rama! (Mantralogy, 2017)

With others

- Ben Allison, Peace Pipe (Palmetto, 2002)
- Cyro Baptista, Beat the Donkey (Beat, 2004)
- Cyro Baptista, Love the Donkey (Tzadik, 2005)
- Jon Batiste, The Process (M.O.D., 2014)
- Will Bernard, Medicine Hat (Antilles, 1998)
- Vinicius Cantuaria, Tucuma (Verve, 1998)
- Don Cherry, Multikulti (A&M, 1990)
- Lisle Ellis, Children in Peril (Music & Arts, 1997)
- Charlie Hunter, Charlie Hunter (Blue Note, 2000)
- Valerie June, The Order of Time (Concord, 2017)
- Bill Laswell, Kauai: the Arch of Heaven (Metastation, 2014)
- Bill Laswell, Risurrezione Dubopera (ESP Disk, 2016)
- Master Musicians of Jajouka featuring Material, Apocalypse Live (M.O.D., 2017)
- Barney McAll, Release the Day (Michael Watt, 2000)
- Lee "Scratch" Perry, Rise Again (M.O.D., 2011)
- Phish, A Live One (Electra, 1995)
- Phish, Road to Vegas (Jemp, 2007)
- Roberto Juan Rodríguez, El Danzon De Moises (Tzadik, 2002)
- Roberto Juan Rodríguez, The First Basket (Tzadik, 2009)
- Josh Roseman, Treats for the Nightwalker (Enja, 2003)
- Josh Roseman, New Constellations (Enja, 2007)
- Adam Rudolph, Can You Imagine... the Sound of a Dream (Meta, 2011)
- Todd Rundgren, Nearly Human (Warner Bros., 1989)
- Sex Mob, Dime Grind Palace (Ropeadope, 2003)
- Paul Shapiro, Midnight Minyan (Tzadik, 2003)
- Paul Shapiro, It's in the Twilight (Tzadik, 2006)
- Omar Sosa, Eggun (Ota, 2013)
- Cassandra Wilson, Vodou Pt. 1 & 2 (Blue Note, 2002)
- Jah Wobble & Bill Laswell, Realm of Spells (Jah Wobble 2019)
- John Zorn, Voices in the Wilderness (Tzadik, 2003)
