= One Man's Trash =

Studio album by Trey Anastasio
- Released: October 27, 1998 (US)
- Recorded: 1997–1998
- Genre: Rock
- Length: 31:54
- Label: PD Records
- Producer: Trey Anastasio

Trey Anastasio chronology
| One Man's Trash (1998) | Trampled By Lambs and Pecked by the Dove (2000) |

Professional ratings
Review scores
| Source | Rating |
|---|---|
| AllMusic | 1.5/5 stars |
| Rolling Stone Album Guide | 2.5/5 stars |

One Man's Trash is Trey Anastasio's first solo album apart from Phish, recorded in the Fungus Factory or in The Barn between 1997 and 1998 during breaks of touring and recording with Phish. The release includes early experimental noise explorations, some of which were reincarnated later into his second album, Trey Anastasio, released in 2002. One Man's Trash was released on October 27, 1998.

Anastasio also designed the album's cover art.

== Track listing ==
1. "Happy Coffee Song" - 2:39
2. "Quantegy" - 2:59
3. "Mister Completely" - 2:41
4. "A Good Stalk" - 0:50
5. "That Dream Machine" - 1:30
6. "The Way I Feel" - 2:55
7. "Rofa Beton" - 2:40
8. "For Lew (My Bodyguard)" - 1:39
9. "At The Barbecue" - 2:01
10. "Tree Spine" - 0:50
11. "Here's Mud In Your Eye" - 1:11
12. "The Real Taste of Licorice" - 2:33
13. "And Your Little Dog Too" - 4:00
14. "Jump Rope (fast version)" - 0:36
15. "Jump Rope (slow version)" - 2:19
16. "Kidney Bean" - 0:33
