= Shine (Trey Anastasio album) =

Studio album by Trey Anastasio
- Released: November 1, 2005 (US)
- Recorded: 2004–05
- Genres: Alternative rock, power pop, neo-psychedelia
- Length: 50:44
- Label: Columbia
- Producer: Brendan O'Brien

Trey Anastasio chronology
Seis De Mayo (2004)	Shine (2005)	Live in Chicago (2005)

Singles from Shine
- 1. "Shine" Released: October 11, 2005; 2. "Tuesday" Released: November 1, 2005

Shine is the fourth solo studio album by Phish frontman Trey Anastasio. It was his first release since the temporary breakup of Phish in August 2004. The album included new material written by Anastasio in late 2004 and early '05. The album also marked the first release by Anastasio apart from Elektra Records, as he signed with Columbia Records for this album. Shine was released on November 1, 2005, and was followed by a nationwide tour beginning in Minneapolis and ending in Los Angeles. It was also released in the DualDisc format.

The title track was Anastasio's most successful solo single on the Billboard Adult Alternative Songs chart, reaching #4 in December 2005.

Professional ratings
Review scores
Source	Rating
All Media Guide	link
The Music Box	March '06
Rolling Stone	link

== Track listing ==
1. "Shine" (Trey Anastasio, Brendan O'Brien) - 3:08
2. "Tuesday" (Anastasio) - 3:43
3. "Invisible" (Anastasio, O'Brien) - 3:53
4. "Come as Melody" (Anastasio) - 4:28
5. "Air Said to Me" (Anastasio) - 3:50
6. "Wherever You Find It" (Anastasio, O'Brien) - 5:54
7. "Sweet Dreams Melinda" (Anastasio, Lawton, Markellis) - 3:36
8. "Love Is Freedom" (Anastasio) - 3:55
9. "Sleep Again" (Anastasio, O'Brien) - 5:01
10. "Spin" (Anastasio, O'Brien) - 4:52
11. "Black" (Anastasio) - 4:32
12. "Love That Breaks All Lines" (Anastasio) - 3:50

== Personnel ==
- Drums - Kenny Aronoff
- Bass guitar, keyboards, drums, backing vocals - Brendan O'Brien
- Percussion - Cyro Baptista
- Bass guitar - Peter Chwazik
- Keyboards - Karl Egsieker, Ray Paczkowski

== Extended copy protection ==
The CD was originally released with Extended Copy Protection, a rootkit based form of copy protection by Sony BMG, who owns Columbia Records, ironic given Phish's lax views on filesharing and concert taping.

After the Sony BMG CD copy prevention scandal, the album was reissued without the copy protection software.
