= Trey Anastasio =

American guitarist (born 1964)

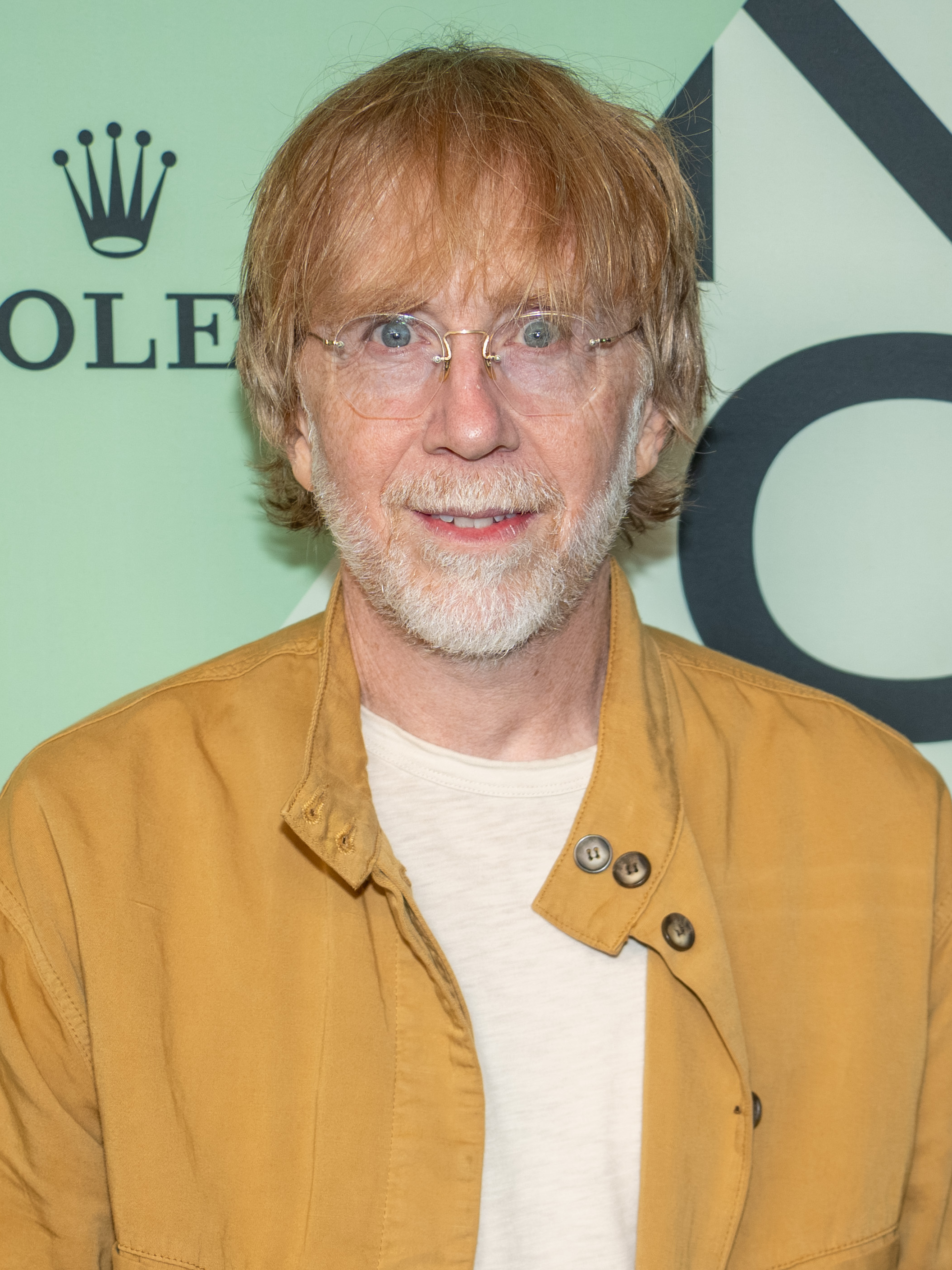
- Anastasio in 2025

Background information
- Also known as: Big Red, the Bad Lieutenant
- Born: Ernest Joseph Anastasio III; September 30, 1964 (age 62); Fort Worth, Texas, U.S.
- Origin: Burlington, Vermont, U.S.
- Genres: Rock; jam; psychedelic; funk; jazz; blues; classical; bluegrass; progressive rock
- Occupations: Musician; songwriter; composer
- Instruments: Guitar; vocals; drums
- Years active: 1982–present
- Labels: Elektra; Sony; Rubber Jungle; Sony BMG; JEMP; MapleMusic Recordings (Canada)
- Member of: Phish; Trey Anastasio Band; Oysterhead; SerialPod; Ghosts of the Forest
- Formerly of: Phil Lesh and Friends; Surrender to the Air; Eight Foot Fluorescent Tubes; Bivouac Jaun; 70 Volt Parade; Dave Matthews and Friends; Fare Thee Well
- Website: trey.com

Ernest Joseph "Trey" Anastasio III (born September 30, 1964) is an American guitarist, composer, and singer-songwriter best known as the lead guitarist of the rock band Phish, which he co-founded in 1983. He is credited by name as composer of 152 Phish original songs, 141 of them as a solo credit, in addition to 41 credits attributed to the band as a whole.

In addition to his work with Phish, Anastasio has released 11 solo albums. He has also been part of several side projects; these include the Trey Anastasio Band, Oysterhead, Ghosts of the Forest, Phil Lesh and Friends, and Surrender to the Air.

He has performed his own compositions with the New York Philharmonic, the Los Angeles Philharmonic, the Baltimore Symphony Orchestra, the Atlanta Symphony Orchestra, the National Symphony Orchestra, and many others. With Amanda Green, he wrote the score for the Broadway musical Hands on a Hardbody. In 2013, they were nominated for a Tony Award for Best Original Score at the 67th Tony Awards, and were awarded the 2013 Dramatists Guild Frederick Loewe Award for best theatrical score composition.

In 2023, Rolling Stone ranked Anastasio at number 53 on their list of the 250 greatest guitarists of all time.

== Early life and career ==
Anastasio was born in Fort Worth, Texas, and moved to Princeton, New Jersey, when he was three. His father, Ernest Anastasio Jr., was an executive vice president at the Educational Testing Service. His mother, Dina, was a children's book author and editor of Sesame Street Magazine. He grew up with his sister Kristy. In 1967, Trey was the inspiration for the lead character in the children's book What Does The Cloud Do?, which was written and illustrated by his grandparents, Jean and Cle Kinney.

Anastasio attended Princeton public schools through the fourth grade, then transferred to Princeton Day School. He graduated from the Taft School along with Steven Pollak, better known as the Dude of Life, who later helped pen such Phish compositions as "Suzy Greenberg", "Fluffhead", "Run Like An Antelope", "Slave to the Traffic Light", and "Dinner and a Movie". At Taft, he formed his first two bands, Red Tide and Space Antelope.

He enrolled at the University of Vermont (UVM) as a philosophy major, where he met original Phish bandmates Jon Fishman, Mike Gordon, and Jeff Holdsworth. On December 2, 1983, the group played their first gig at a dance in the Harris-Millis Cafeteria at UVM. The setlist consisted of cover songs, including "Long Cool Woman" and "Proud Mary" which was performed twice. The band was very primitive at this time and used hockey sticks as mic stands. After performing one set, Michael Jackson's Thriller album was put on by a party-goer to drown out the band. The band would not return to play but were still paid for the performance. At UVM, he hosted an early morning radio program, Ambient Alarm Clock.

While living at home for a semester he attended Mercer County Community College. While there, he reconnected with his childhood friend Tom Marshall, and the pair began a songwriting collaboration and recorded material that would appear on the Bivouac Jaun demo tape. In addition to Marshall, Anastasio also reconnected with another childhood friend, Marc Daubert, who also became a collaborator. After seeing a Phish show, pianist Page McConnell joined Phish in the autumn of 1985. Anastasio, along with Jon Fishman, transferred to Goddard College.

During this time he began a musical association and close friendship with composer Ernie Stires, who taught him composition, theory, and arranging. While at Goddard, he composed the song cycle The Man Who Stepped into Yesterday as his senior project. These songs became mainstays of the Phish catalog. He graduated from Goddard in 1988.

== Career ==
=== Phish ===
Anastasio is a founding member of the rock band Phish, serving as lead guitarist and vocalist since their inception. Phish is noted for their musical improvisation, extended jams, exploration of a broad range of genres, and original live performances. Formed at the University of Vermont in 1983 (with the current line up solidifying in 1985), the band includes bassist and vocalist Mike Gordon; percussionist, vacuum player, and vocalist Jon Fishman; and keyboardist and vocalist Page McConnell. Phish performed together for over 20 years, releasing 10 studio albums, disbanding in August 2004. They reunited in March 2009 for a corresponding tour, released a reunion album Joy and have since resumed performing regularly.

==== Phish-related projects ====
- Bivouac Jaun in 1984 was a project featuring Anastasio, Phish lyricist Tom Marshall, and one-time Phish collaborator Marc Daubert. The group recorded a four-track project during Phish's short hiatus in the summer of 1984. Much of the project would be retooled and later featured on the first Phish album, The White Tape, in 1986.
- Bad Hat, formed in the spring of 1994, included Jon Fishman on drums, Jamie Masefield on mandolin, and Stacey Starkweather on bass. They casually played improvisational jazz around Burlington, Vermont, for a few months, with the first of several shows at Last Elm Cafe. They billed themselves as "the quietest band around".
- Surrender to the Air was a free jazz ensemble led by Anastasio and featuring Fishman, as well as Marshall Allen, Damon Choice, and Michael Ray (trumpeter) of The Sun Ra Arkestra, John Medeski, Marc Ribot, Oteil Burbridge and several other musicians. The group performed two concerts at the New York City Arts Academy in April 1996 and disbanded shortly thereafter. The concerts, like the group's sole album, consisted of completely improvised music.
- 8 Foot Fluorescent Tubes, played a show on April 17, 1998 at Higher Grounds featuring Anastasio, Tom Lawson, Heloise Willimas, Tony Markellis, and Russel Lawton.
- Phil Lesh and Friends (commonly referred to as Phil Lesh and Phriends) in 1999 featured Anastasio and Page McConnell, Grateful Dead members Phil Lesh and Donna Jean Godchaux, guitarist Steve Kimock, and drummer John Molo performing three nights of Dead and Phish material at The Warfield in San Francisco. It was the first time members of both Phish and the Dead shared the stage together. On February 12, 2006, Anastasio joined Lesh again for a full show at the Beacon Theatre in New York City. He did so again on October 20, 2007, in Glens Falls, New York.
- SerialPod is a trio featuring Anastasio, Gordon and Grateful Dead drummer Bill Kreutzmann. On December 17, 2005, the band performed at the 14th annual Warren Haynes Christmas Jam in Asheville, North Carolina. The group performed a series of Grateful Dead and Phish classics, plus covers from Nirvana, Jimi Hendrix, and others. Ivan Neville joined the group on keyboards for much of the performance.
- A quartet consisting of the Benevento/Russo Duo, Gordon and Anastasio traded opening and closing spots with Phil Lesh and Friends during their co-headlining summer 2006 tour before touring on their own for a number of shows in July 2006.
- Ghosts of the Forest is a side project for Anastasio and Fishman, which also features vocalist Jennifer Hartswick, guitarist Celisse Henderson, bassist Tony Markellis, and keyboardist Ray Paczkowski. The group was formed in 2018 and performed a short tour in the spring of 2019. The Ghosts of the Forest album, which is credited to Anastasio as a solo artist, was released on April 12, 2019.

=== Trey Anastasio Band ===
Trey Anastasio Band debuted in 1998 as Eight Foot Fluorescent Tubes, as a local band in Vermont fronted by Anastasio, on April 17 of that year at the opening week of the nightclub Higher Ground, co-owned by his brother-in-law. The band debuted a number of songs heard in Anastasio's live performances today, including "First Tube", "Last Tube", and "Mozambique". The Trio in 1999 was an evolution of Eight Foot Fluorescent Tubes. Anastasio's first solo tour was with the trio, which included himself, Russ Lawton, and Tony Markellis. Markellis was an early influence on Anastasio and seeing the bassist perform with the Unknown Blues Band was a major reason he decided to attend UVM. The trio reunited in late 2008 (along with keyboardist Ray Packowski) for a tour of the Northeast United States. The band expanded to a sextet in 2000 with three horn players added to the band (Dave Grippo on alto sax, Jennifer Hartswick on trumpet and tuba, and Andy Moroz on trombone). Some of the music originally performed by the sextet was later seen on his 2002 release, Trey Anastasio. A year later they evolved into The Octet which added Ray Paczkowski on keyboards and Russell Remington on tenor sax and flute; and The Dectet in 2002 through 2004 explored complex arrangements and changes of some songs included on Trey Anastasio, and was an evolved version of the octet, now a ten-piece band with the addition of Peter Apfelbaum on baritone sax and percussion, and Cyro Baptista on percussion.

On August 10, 2008, Trey Anastasio and Classic TAB played a set at the All Points West Music & Arts Festival at Liberty State Park in New Jersey. They opened with "Sand" and played a few other classic Anastasio/Markellis/Lawton compositions (songs that were also later recorded by Phish) including "Gotta Jibboo" and "Heavy Things".

On the twentieth anniversary of the original Eight Foot Fluorescent Tubes show, April 17, 2018, Anastasio, Markellis and Lawton embarked on a tour featuring performances of Anastasio songs previously performed by Phish, such as "No Men In No Man's Land", "Camel Walk" and "Party Time" (written by Jon Fishman).

=== Solo work ===
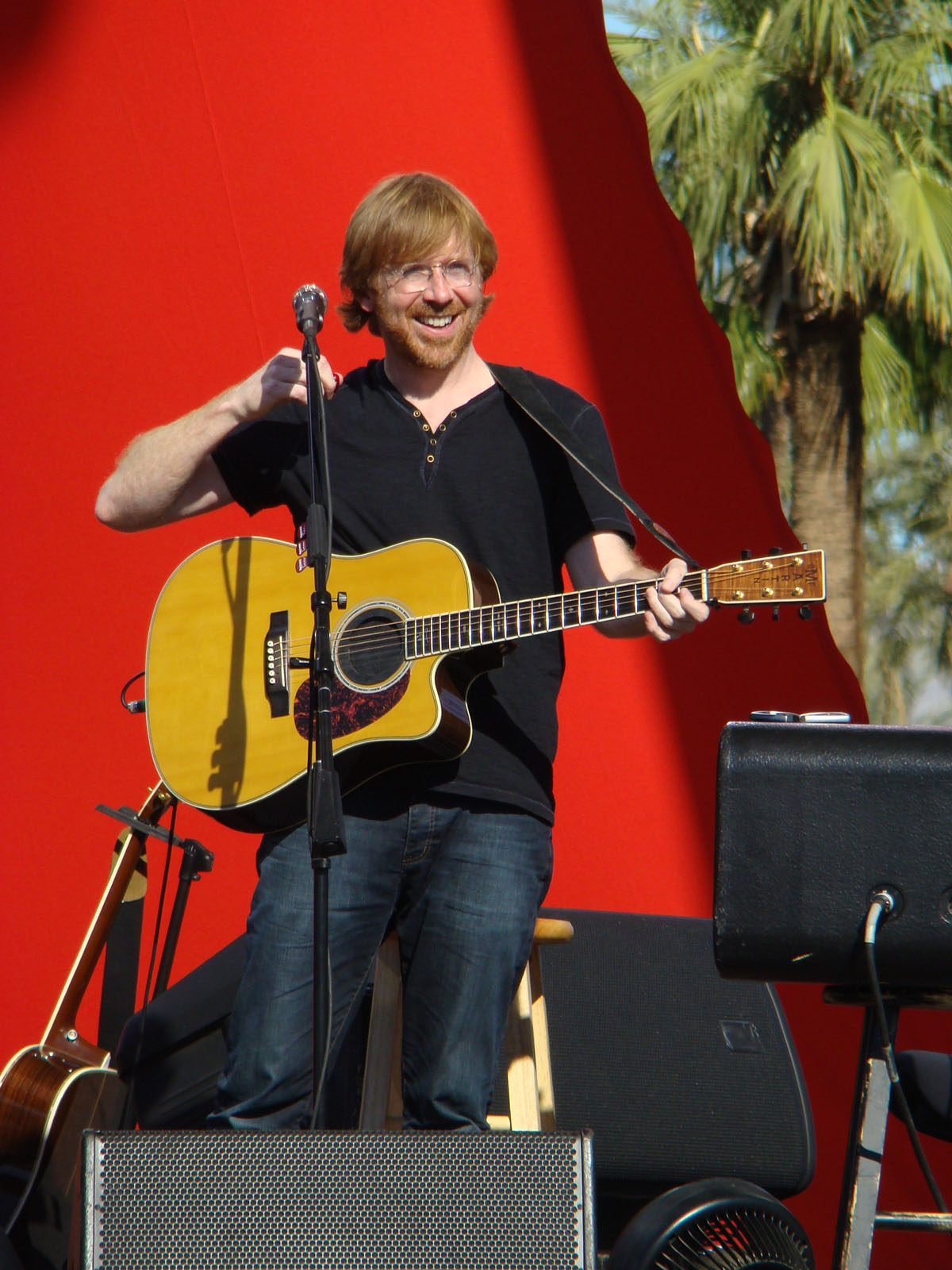
Anastasio performing in 2009

Anastasio was featured on the album True Love by Toots and the Maytals, which won the Grammy Award in 2004 for Best Reggae Album, and showcased many notable musicians including Willie Nelson, Eric Clapton, Jeff Beck, Gwen Stefani / No Doubt, Ben Harper, Bonnie Raitt, Manu Chao, The Roots, Ryan Adams, Keith Richards, Toots Hibbert, Paul Douglas, Jackie Jackson, Ken Boothe, and The Skatalites. Anastasio can be heard playing guitar on the song "Sweet and Dandy".

In September 2004, he performed with the Vermont Youth Orchestra at Carnegie Hall.

In 2006, Anastasio toured with Mike Gordon and the Benevento/Russo Duo. The project, known unofficially as G.R.A.B. played a number of shows with Phil Lesh.

In July 2007, he released another instrumental album, The Horseshoe Curve, via his own Rubber Jungle Records. On August 14, he made a surprise guest appearance in Saratoga Springs, New York during Dave Matthews Band's performance at the Saratoga Performing Arts Center. He sat in and jammed with the band during "Lie in Our Graves".

In June 2008, Anastasio guested on the Robert Randolph Band's set, who opened for an Eric Clapton concert.

On August 7, 2008, he played his first post-rehab electric show at the Music Hall of Williamsburg in Brooklyn, New York debuting: "Alaska" (electric version; the song was debuted acoustic at Rothbury), "Peggy", "Gone", "Backwards Down the Number Line" (electric version; the song was debuted acoustic at Rothbury), "Valentine", "Greyhound Rising", and "Light". Four of these seven songs have found their way into the Phish live repertoire and on official studio releases.

On September 27, 2008, Anastasio debuted Time Turns Elastic, an orchestral epic co-created with composer Don Hart, at the Ryman Auditorium in Nashville Tennessee. The east coast premier of "Time Turns Elastic" was performed on May 21, 2009, with conductor Marin Alsop and the Baltimore Symphony Orchestra at the Joseph Meyerhoff Symphony Hall in Baltimore, Maryland. The performance also included the debut of the orchestral version of Anastasio's "First Tube".

On September 12, 2009, Anastasio performed "An Evening with Trey Anastasio and the New York Philharmonic" at Carnegie Hall in Manhattan with the New York Philharmonic, playing various compositions including "Divided Sky","You Enjoy Myself", and "Time Turns Elastic". This concert was a benefit for his sister, through the Kristy Anastasio Manning Memorial Fund and the New York Philharmonic.

While not touring with Phish, Anastasio performs tours with both TAB and acoustic solo concerts.

On July 30, 2020, Anastasio released Lonely Trip, a collection of original songs written during the COVID-19 pandemic and recorded at his home studio in New York. The LP was mixed by Bryce Goggin and features lyrical collaborations with Tom Marshall and Scott Herman. Anastasio says the project reminded him of his pre-Phish 4-track home recordings.

In October 2020, Anastasio performed an eight-week residency at the Beacon Theatre in New York. The eight concerts were performed without an audience and streamed live every Friday from October 9 to November 27 for free on Twitch. Anastasio raised $1.2 million of donations from the Beacon Jams for his Divided Sky Foundation, which used those funds were used to purchase a property in Ludlow, Vermont to act as a drug rehabilitation center.

On March 11, 2022, Anastasio released his first all-acoustic solo album, Mercy. The nine-song album was produced by Bryce Goggin and Robert Stevenson, and mixed by Mike Fahey. It was intended as a follow-up to Lonely Trip, with Anastasio saying the songs were inspired by further time spent in isolation due to the COVID-19 pandemic: "[Mercy] is like a bookend. It's two years since we went into hiding. This is still going on, and it's an even lonelier trip." Upon the album's release, Anastasio described songwriting as one of his greatest joys.

Anastasio recorded train announcements for the MTA New York City Transit's Subway system in December 2025 to promote Phish's New Years Eve concerts at Madison Square Garden.

=== Other projects ===
- Space Antelope played from 1982 to 1983, featuring Anastasio, The Dude of Life, Doug Parsons (drums, English teacher at the Boys' Latin School of Maryland), Dudley Taft and others. The band performed originals as well as covers from Rush, The Velvet Underground, and others.
- Surrender to the Air – 1995–1996; An experimental band, playing long sections of improvisation all connected by segments conducted by Anastasio. The group released a self-titled album in March 1996. It featured several members of the late Sun Ra's big band, the Arkestra, which was (among other modes) an archetypical free jazz ensemble.
- The Vermont Youth Orchestra has performed with Anastasio on a number of occasions, including a performance at Carnegie Hall. Anastasio's attraction to complex compositions was apparent on his 2004 release, Seis De Mayo, which included some of his work with the Vermont Youth Orchestra, as well as other smaller ensembles.
- Oysterhead – A trio that included Primus bassist Les Claypool and The Police drummer Stewart Copeland. The original intention of the band was to play a single concert, on May 4, 2000. The supergroup then released an album in 2001 named The Grand Pecking Order, and toured the United States in the Fall of 2001. The band reunited June 16, 2006, at the Bonnaroo Music Festival. The band reunited again in early 2020 but show plans stalled after Covid 19-Pandemic until 2021, where they headlined The Peach Music Festival.
- Dave Matthews & Friends – A band formed in 2003 to tour in support of Dave Matthews's solo debut Some Devil. Most of the band, including Anastasio, performed on the album.
- 70 Volt Parade was Anastasio's rock-based solo band featuring Ray Paczkowski on keyboards, Les Hall on guitar and synthesizers, and Skeeto Valdez on drums. The band was active throughout 2005.
- The Grateful Dead featured Anastasio on lead guitar and vocals as part of their final run of five "Fare Thee Well" 50th anniversary shows in Santa Clara (June 27 and 28, 2015) and Chicago (July 3, 4 and 5, 2015).
- Ghosts of the Forest - Featuring Trey Anastasio, Jon Fishman, Jennifer Hartswick, Celisse Henderson, Tony Markellis, and Ray Paczkowski. The band toured April 2019, and the self titled album was released April 12, 2019.

=== Composition work ===
In college, Anastasio studied composition under composer and arranger Ernie Stires. "Guelah Papyrus", featured on Phish's major label debut A Picture of Nectar, includes a Stires-influenced fugue instrumental section called "The Asse Festival" as a bridge between verses. In the early years of Phish, many of Anastasio's compositions were through-composed, intricate and detailed in conception (for example, "The Divided Sky", "You Enjoy Myself", "The Asse Festival", "The Squirming Coil", "Reba", "Fluff's Travels"). Anastasio has used improvisation as the driving force behind simplified songwriting, particularly in the music he has written for his touring and recording projects apart from Phish. Tom Marshall, a New Jersey computer systems professional and friend of Anastasio since his Princeton childhood, has been his primary songwriting collaborator, acting as lyricist. Anastasio has often pulled lyrics for his music from large notebooks of poems and prose kept by Marshall, and the pair have taken working retreats during which they wrote and/or recorded demos of new material. One such demo, Trampled By Lambs and Pecked by the Dove, has been commercially released, and many of the songs included on this release were reincarnated into Phish's 1998 album The Story of the Ghost. Anastasio also writes a number of his own lyrics, including all of the lyrics on his first release with Columbia Records, 2005's Shine.

One of Anastasio's signature compositional techniques is the use of episodic (or organic) form. "Fluff's Travels" and "You Enjoy Myself" are good examples of through-composed pieces which evolve from one musical idea to the other, never returning to a previous musical statement. This technique had been used in a rock music setting by relatively few before Phish (Frank Zappa and the Grateful Dead are two such examples).

Anastasio employs modal improvisation, first made popular by Miles Davis in the late 1950s/early 1960s.

Anastasio has also demonstrated skill at composing chamber music and music for orchestra, most notably on Seis De Mayo, his second solo album, and in his collaborations with the Vermont Youth Orchestra.

On September 27, 2008, Anastasio and Orchestra Nashville premiered a new work titled Time Turns Elastic, an original long-form piece that was orchestrated by composer and arranger Don Hart, and featured Anastasio on lead guitar and vocals. Anastasio previously collaborated with Hart and Orchestra Nashville in his orchestral performance of "Guyute" at Bonnaroo 2004. He performed the same composition at Carnegie Hall with the Vermont Youth Orchestra on September 14, 2004, and with the New York Philharmonic on September 12, 2009. Anastasio played the Walt Disney Concert Hall accompanied by the Los Angeles Philharmonic on March 10, 2012.

Anastasio's 2012 album Traveler was a collaboration with producer Peter Katis, whose longtime band The Philistines Jr. opened for Phish at UVM early in their career.

He was nominated for a 2013 Best Original score Tony Award, an Outstanding New Score Drama Desk Award, and Outstanding Music and Outstanding Orchestrations Outer Critics Circle Awards for the musical Hands on a Hardbody. That year, he also received the Frederick Loewe Award from the Dramatists Guild of America, which recognizes achievement in a theatrical score.

Hands on a Hardbody received nine 2012–2013 Drama Desk Awards, tying for most nominations, and winning in the Best Sound Design in a Musical category.

Anastasio co-wrote the music for Hands on a Hardbody (along with Amanda Green) for a Broadway opening in March 2013. After only 56 performances, the show closed on April 13, making it the "fastest closing new musical of the season."

=== Media appearances ===
On March 15, 2010, Anastasio inducted one of his favorite bands, Genesis, into the Rock and Roll Hall of Fame, claiming it was "impossible to overstate what impact this band and musical philosophy had on me as a young musician. I'm forever in their debt." In addition to Anastasio's speech, Phish appeared and performed two Genesis songs, "Watcher of the Skies" and "No Reply At All". Genesis did not perform.

In June 2010, Anastasio appeared as a surprise musical guest on Conan O'Brien's "The Legally Prohibited from Being Funny on Television Tour" stop at Tower Theater in Upper Darby Township, Pennsylvania, where he performed "Alaska."

Between Me and My Mind, a documentary film directed by Steven Cantor about Anastasio's musical projects and Phish's 2018 New Year's Eve concert, was screened at the Tribeca Film Festival in April 2019.

== Guitar playing style and stage equipment ==
Anastasio has employed the services of his friend, luthier and audio-technician Paul Languedoc (Phish's soundman from 1986 to 2004) throughout his career. The highly resonant hollow-body electric guitars built by Languedoc for Anastasio, his Ibanez Tube Screamers, and Ross Compressors are key to his signature tone. Anastasio has several custom Languedoc hollow-body electric guitars, which make use of set maple necks with 24-fret ebony fretboards and dual Seymour Duncan SH-1 '59 humbucker pickups. During Phish's 2018 Halloween "musical costume" set, Anastasio deviated from his Languedoc guitars and performed with a white Ed O'Brien model Fender Stratocaster.

Anastasio's electric guitar technique is largely conventional; he does not typically make use of tapping techniques and does not usually play slide guitar (an example of when he does is in the Oysterhead section of Les Claypool's 5 Gallons of Diesel) but is known to be competent at both techniques. He normally uses a 2.0mm Adamas graphite guitar pick, but does not always do so. Melodically, he often incorporates modes, notably the dorian, mixolydian, and locrian, as well as pentatonic scales. In addition to scales, Anastasio makes abundant use of arpeggios while improvising as well as in his compositional material. Anastasio's guitar influences include Robert Fripp, John McLaughlin, Jerry Garcia, Pat Metheny, Frank Zappa and Jimi Hendrix.

Effects processors play a crucial role in achieving Anastasio's guitar tone. He uses effects such as two Ibanez TS-9 Tube Screamers (with Analogman's Silver Mod) in sequence, the famous Univibe clone the Black Cat Vibe, and a Ross compressor. He switched to Analogman's Bicompressor around 1998, dropped the compressor from his rig in 2002, and resumed use of the Ross Compressor in 2008 when a group of fans who desired the return of Anastasio's "signature" Ross compressor sound pooled their resources to obtain a vintage Ross Compressor and sent it to Anastasio in an attempt to compel him to return the vintage effect pedal to his rig. Anastasio responded through friend and longtime collaborator Tom Marshall's website explaining that he had lost his original Ross Compressor and that he was so touched that people cared about his effects and guitar tone that he would add the gift to his rig in the original configuration where it has remained ever since. He also uses a wah wah pedal (usually a Real McCoy Custom 3 by Geoffrey Teese), a Boomerang phrase sampler, Custom Audio Electronics Super Tremolo, Ibanez DM2000 delay, Alesis Microverb II (set to reverse), Whammy II pitch shifter, as well as a Leslie rotating speaker horn. In 2009, Anastasio added a Nova Repeater (delay). He controls these devices singularly or in batch with a Custom Audio Electronics RS-10 footpedal bank.

In the early 1990s, Anastasio employed a custom 2x12 speaker cabinet powered by either a 100W Mesa/Boogie Mark III head or, later, a Custom Audio Electronics 3-channel preamp and Groove Tubes power amp. In mid-1997, he switched to a pair of modified 1965 Fender Deluxe Reverb amps, one serving as a backup. When Phish returned in 2009, Anastasio was back to using the Mesa Boogie MKIII. In 2013 he added a Bogner Shiva amp to his arsenal, which can still be seen on stage as recently as Summer Tour 2014, though has not been used much during that tour.

Anastasio played three different acoustic guitars by Martin. The first is a D-45E which has East Indian Rosewood sides and back and a solid Sitka Spruce top. In 2005, Martin released a Trey Anastasio signature model acoustic guitar, with a dreadnought body with a curved Venetian cutaway. The guitar also has an Italian alpine spruce top, mahogany sides and a three-piece back with "wings" of mahogany and a center wedge of flame-figured Hawaiian koa (similar to a D-35). The guitar is finished with a flamed koa headplate and snowflake fingerboard inlays. From 2017 on, a Martin 1943 D28 has been his main guitar for standard tuning, a Martin 1934 00028 for finger-style/open tunings, and a 1968 D35 for Drop and slack key tunings.

The history of Anastasio's guitars, rig and equipment has been meticulously documented by music writer Ryan Chiachiere on the blog Trey's Guitar Rig.

== Personal life ==
Anastasio has been married to Susan Statesir, his college girlfriend, since August 13, 1994. They live on the Upper West Side of Manhattan and have two daughters, Eliza and Isabella. His sister, Kristy Manning, died of cancer in April 2009. Anastasio is Catholic.

On December 15, 2006, Anastasio was stopped by police in Whitehall, New York, on a traffic violation. He failed a field sobriety test, and was subsequently arrested for possession of heroin and other drugs, and driving while intoxicated. Anastasio pleaded guilty to a reduced felony drug charge and spent 14 months participating in daily meetings, drug testing, and performing community service in the Washington County, New York, drug court program. In June 2008, after completing all phases of the New York State drug court, Anastasio graduated in good standing. His conviction was reduced to a misdemeanor. He has publicly thanked the officer who arrested him for turning his life around. Following this experience, he became an active participant in the National Association of Drug Court Professionals (NADCP), sharing his story on Capitol Hill, and working to help raise awareness and money, for a National Drug Court. Anastasio has maintained sobriety since January 2007, and detailed his opiate addiction, arrest and rehabilitation in a January 2019 GQ feature on sober musicians.

== The Barn ==
The Barn, also known as The Farmhouse, is Anastasio's rehearsal and recording facility in the countryside near Westford, Vermont in the state's Lamoille Valley region. It was reconstructed between 1996 and 1998 from an existing structure, the Alan Irish Barn. The Barn has been used by Phish and most of Anastasio's projects since 1999. The cover photo of the Phish album Farmhouse is of the outhouse located next to The Barn.

Other artists who have recorded or performed at The Barn include Gordon Stone Band, Herbie Hancock, Béla Fleck, Swampadelica, John Patitucci, DJ Logic, Toots & the Maytals, Tony Levin, The Slip, RAQ, John Medeski, Jerry Douglas, Nicholas Cassarino, Van Ghost and Addison Groove Project, Karina Rykman.

Beginning in 2006, The Barn was transformed from a commercial recording facility into a studio environment providing accommodations and work space for artists participating in the Seven Below residency program.

== Solo discography ==
=== Studio albums ===
- One Man's Trash (October 27, 1998)
- Trey Anastasio (April 30, 2002) (No. 45 Billboard 200)
- Seis De Mayo (April 6, 2004)
- Shine (November 1, 2005) (No. 64 Billboard 200)
- Bar 17 (October 3, 2006) (No. 102 Billboard 200)
- The Horseshoe Curve (July 24, 2007) (No. 167 Billboard 200)
- Time Turns Elastic (May 12, 2009)
- Traveler (October 16, 2012) (No. 51 Billboard 200)
- Paper Wheels (October 30, 2015) (No. 181 Billboard 200)
- Ghosts of the Forest (April 12, 2019)
- Lonely Trip (July 31, 2020)
- Mercy (March 11, 2022)
- Atriums (September 20, 2024)

=== Live albums ===
- Plasma (April 29, 2003) (No. 102 Billboard 200)
- Original Boardwalk Style (June 10, 2008)
- TAB at the Tab (September 14, 2010)
- TAB at the Fox Theater (February 8, 2019)
- Ghosts of the Forest: Beneath a Sea of Stars (July 19, 2019)
- Burn It Down (September 18, 2020)
- Live and Acoustic (April 3, 2026)

=== Collaborations ===
- Surrender to the Air (with Surrender to the Air) (1996)
- Trampled by Lambs and Pecked by the Dove (with Tom Marshall) (November 1, 2000)
- The Grand Pecking Order (with Oysterhead) (October 2, 2001)
- Fare Thee Well: Celebrating 50 Years of the Grateful Dead (with the Grateful Dead) (November 20, 2015)
- Tedeschi Trucks Band's Layla Revisited (Live At Lock'n, August 24, 2019)
- December (with Page McConnell) (December 24, 2020)
- January (with Page McConnell) (March 10, 2023)

=== EPs ===
- Live in Chicago (November 1, 2005) (as bonus with Shine)
- Live 2006 (October 3, 2006) (as a bonus disc with Bar 17 website pre-orders)
- 18 Steps (October 3, 2006) (as a bonus with Bar 17 and as a download)
- Live in New York City 12-31-05 (2006) (as a bonus with Shine)
- The Lucius Beebe EP (July 24, 2007) (as a bonus with The Horseshoe Curve)
- Blue Ash And Other Suburbs (April 20, 2013) (limited edition Record Store Day vinyl release)

=== Videos and films ===
- Vermont Youth Orchestra with Trey Anastasio & Ernie Stires (2001, recorded live at Flynn Theater, Burlington, Vermont on February 4, 2001)
- Trey Anastasio with Special Guest Carlos Santana (2004, recorded live in San Francisco on May 31, 2003)
- Inside Out: Trey and Dave Go to Africa (2004, Documentary based in Senegal, Africa featuring Dave Matthews and Orchestra Baobab)
- Between Me and My Mind (2019, Documentary detailing Trey's writing process and the preparations for Phish's NYE show in Madison Square Garden)

=== Session guitar work ===
- Heads or Tails by Jamie Notarthomas (1995)
- Under the Sound Umbrella by The Dude of Life (June 8, 1999)
- Lettin' Go by Son Seals (2000)
- Lookout for Hope by Jerry Douglas (May 7, 2002)
- Some Devil by Dave Matthews (September 23, 2003)
- True Love by Toots & the Maytals (April 6, 2004)
- Possibilities by Herbie Hancock (August 29, 2005)
- It Is Written by Peter Apfelbaum (August 30, 2005)
- Page McConnell by Page McConnell (April 17, 2007)
- The Green Sparrow by Mike Gordon (August 5, 2008)
