= Tony Markellis =

American musician (1952–2021)

Tony Markellis (10 September 1952 – 29 April 2021) was a bassist and record producer, born in Helena, Montana, to a Greek immigrant, Constantine Markellis, and the daughter of Greek immigrants, Victoria Carkulis, residing in Saratoga Springs, New York from 1975 until his death. Markellis was best known as the bass guitarist for the Trey Anastasio Band and various other groups led by Phish guitarist Trey Anastasio.

== Career ==
In his forty-seven year career he played blues, folk, jazz, rock, country, and bluegrass with musicians such as Trey Anastasio, Paul Butterfield, The Mamas & the Papas, Johnny Shines, David Bromberg, David Amram, Paul Siebel, Rosalie Sorrels, Eric Von Schmidt, Ellen McIlwaine, Mary McCaslin, Railbird, Jo Henley, and Floodwood. Markellis was a founding member of the groundbreaking Vermont-based jazz fusion group Kilimanjaro, as well as the Unknown Blues Band featuring Big Joe Burrell. In the late 1990s, Markellis became the first member of the first solo band of Phish guitarist Trey Anastasio, forming the rhythm section with drummer Russ Lawton. Including his work with Anastasio, Markellis has appeared on over one hundred albums. In addition to tours with the Trey Anastasio Band, he was working with Kilimanjaro, singer/songwriters Michael Jerling and Bob Warren, Ghosts of the Forest (a Phish/TAB hybrid), Mardi Gras carnival funk band Krewe Orleans, and occasionally with Americana band Jo Henley. On June 20, 2010 (Fathers Day), Tony was invited on stage at Saratoga Performing Arts Center (SPAC) to play bass with Phish on "Gotta Jibboo" (one of the songs he cowrote with Trey and Russ Lawton for the Trey Anastasio Band). Phish's bassist, Mike Gordon played the second guitar during the song.

One of Markellis' final public performances was accompanying Anastasio for the majority of his "Beacon Jams" series of livestream concert series in the fall of 2020, which were held in the empty Beacon Theatre during the COVID-19 pandemic.

== Death ==
Markellis died on April 29, 2021.
