= Rubber Jungle Records =

Independent record label created by Trey Anastasio

- Founded: 1998
- Founder: Trey Anastasio
- Genre: Rock
- Country of origin: U.S.
- Location: Burlington, Vermont

Rubber Jungle Records is an independent record label created by Phish frontman Trey Anastasio. It was started by Anastasio to release his album One Man's Trash. The label released Anastasio's The Horseshoe Curve on July 24, 2007, and the live album Original Boardwalk Style on June 10, 2008.

== See also ==
- List of record labels
