= Armstrong award =

There are several Armstrong awards, named after different people called Armstrong.

- Louis Armstrong award for musical achievement in high school
- Edwin Howard Armstrong award for excellence and originality in radio broadcasting
