= Steve Honoshowsky =

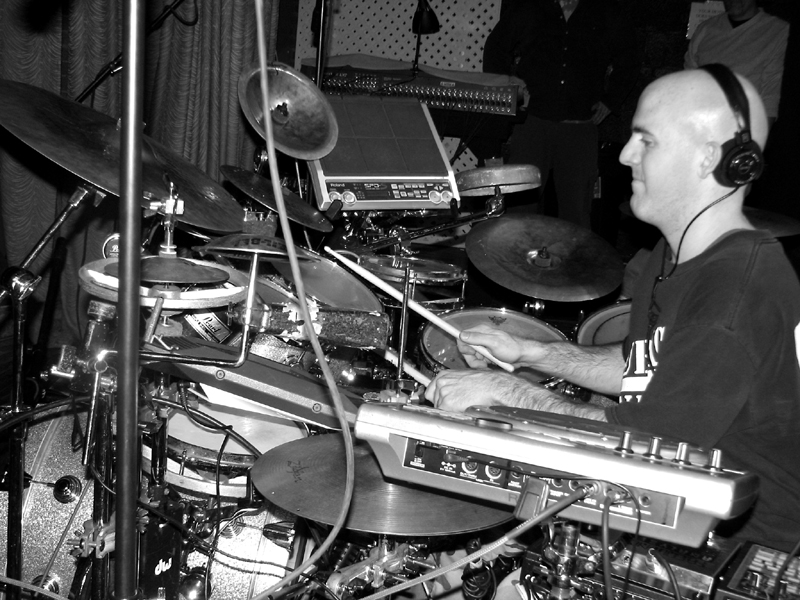
- Steve performing at the Strasburg Theater, April 12, 2007

Background information
- Origin: Basking Ridge, NJ
- Genres: avant-garde, electronica, drum n' bass, experimental, punk, etc.
- Years active: 1989 - Present
- Label: Independent
- Website: http://www.nouseforhumans.com

Steve Honoshowsky is a professional musician raised in Basking Ridge, NJ.

He began playing drums at the age of ten, inspired by the likes of Neil Peart, Bill Bruford, and Terry Bozzio. In 2008, Honoshowsky represented the United States at the YMCA Europe Festival in Prague, Czech Republic, giving two solo drum performances on the center stage. Honoshowsky studied briefly under Chris Pennie (Dillinger Escape Plan, Coheed and Cambria) and is currently studying under percussionist Billy Martin (Medeski Martin and Wood). He has performed with Cyro Baptista and Billy Martin's Student Bodies, with Billy's Mystery Riddim Band (featuring Kato Hidecki and Shahzad Ismaily), as well as Billy's Fang Percussion Ensemble. He is also featured in Billy's DVD entitled "Life on Drums", which was released on October 8, 2010. Honoshowsky is most commonly known as the founder of No Use For Humans (NUFH), an avant-garde electronica band from New Jersey, and he's also the founder of the drumming collective Speak Softly and Carry a Big Stick. Honoshowsky has performed and recorded with many metro New York City/ New Jersey bands, from hip-hop band Universal Rebel to world/avant-garde group In Petto, has toured the United States with hardcore band Hungry Housewives, and also performs solo sets under the name Soul Amputation. In addition to performing, Honoshowsky teaches private lessons, hosts drum workshops, and is a facilitator The Rhythmic Arts Project (TRAP) program for therapy and to increase coordination and motor skills for physically and mentally disabled people. In addition, Honoshowsky plays bass and a variety of keyboards/electronics/vocals.

== Background ==
Steve was born on February 7, 1979, in Morristown, NJ. Growing up, he had aspirations to play the electric guitar, but was dissuaded by his parents who informed him he could not play guitar in the high school concert band, which like his older brothers he intended on joining. Drums were the next best thing in his mind, so he picked up the sticks and began practicing his rudiment every day while listening to bands like Rush, Yes, and Frank Zappa. Beginning in middle school, Steve performed with guitarist Jay Sorce and bassist Rob Gorman in the band Pigs In Space. Pigs in Space gained a cult following in central New Jersey in the early 1990s until eventual breakup in 1995. He attended St. Thomas Aquinas College, graduating in 2001.

== Speak Softly and Carry a Big Stick ==
In 2008, Honoshowsky founded the drumming collective Speak Softly and Carry a Big Stick. Speak Softly has opened doors to what can be created in the medium of "percussion only music". Each guest drummer was asked to record a drum piece. They were given no parameters as to what to play. Upon receiving each recording, Honoshowsky would listen to them just once and then record a duet piece over top of it. The idea was to keep it sounding as "in the moment" as possible. On Valentine's Day 2008, Honoshowsky and Amir Ziv performed their drum duets at the Issue Project Room in Brooklyn, NY, as part of Billy Martin's Week of Drums and Percussion.

=== Volume 1 ===
1. Amir Ziv (Droid, KOT KOT)
2. Tim Kieper (Cyro Baptista's Beat the Donkey, Banquet of Spirits)
3. Steve Dans (Daylow)
4. Chris Pennie (Dillinger Escape Plan, Coheed and Cambria)
5. Ben Ross (Mothguts)
6. Pete Andrews (Big Mechanical Bull)
7. Ben Clapp (Skeleton Key)
8. Charlie Zeleny (Behold...The Arctopus)

=== Volume 2 ===
1. Ches Smith (Marc Ribot, Secret Chiefs 3)
2. Brian Wolinski (117, The Loose Roosters, Joe Harvard Band)
3. G. Calvin Weston (Lounge Lizards, Ornette Coleman, Marc Ribot)
4. Bob Vaccarelli (Skeleton Key, Miss TK & The Revenge)
5. Amir Ziv (Droid, KOT KOT)
6. Chuck Treece (McRad)
7. Mike Wojik (Bonk, Trio of Madness)
8. Mike Noordzy (Mothguts, Intense Men)
9. Brian DeMello (Montagna & The Mouth To Mouth, Strange Things Done in the Midnight Sun)
10. Tribal Groove

== No Use For Humans ==
=== 2003–2005 ===
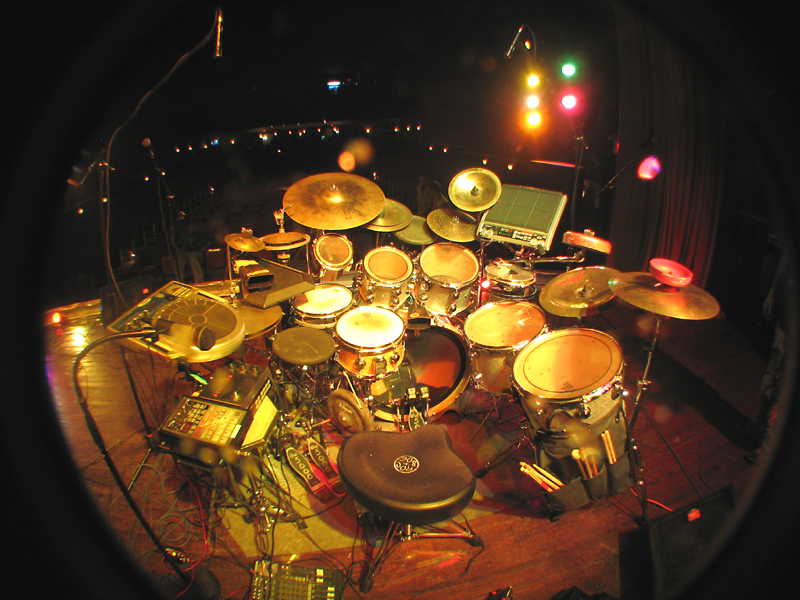
Setup that was used for solo performances

NUFH was formed in 2003 when Honoshowky and keyboardist Sean Wegeler got together and performed and recorded as a duo, creating music that was structured compositionally and sonically in a way neither had experienced before. This style was dubbed "experimental electronic math rock". "The music was based on a freewheeling style blending imrpov-centric electronics and ethnic motifs with a complex patchwork of oddly linked themes and shifting time signatures." Their debut self-titled EP was recorded in October 2003 and was often compared to the likings of a Frank Zappa or Mike Patton project, while much of the sound gives it the feel of an obscure Sci-Fi or video game soundtrack. "Almost entirely instrumental (only "Robots! (V. Brue)" contains some distorted vocals), the music is based on quickly rotating riffs, each seldom lasting more than a few bars." Lesson From A Dying Breed was their sophomore release. Its eight studio tracks were recorded in September 2004, followed by 6 tracks recorded live at the Brighton Bar on September 14, 2004 in Long Branch, NJ, during an opening act for the band Captured! By Robots. As read on jambands.com, Lesson's "...eight studio tracks careen cinematically through bizarre melodic percussion, hip-hop, metal, and other sonic chicanery...No Use For Humans is the virtual definition of what it means to be adventurous, to abandon received wisdom (and musical traditions) and just get loose." An uncovering of Honoshowsky's love for 1970s and 1980s music and soundtracks is exposed with covers of "99 Luftballons" by Nena, "The Imperial March" from Star Wars, and "Obituaries/Candyman" by Danny Elfman and Philip Glass, respectively.

=== March 2005–September 2006 ===
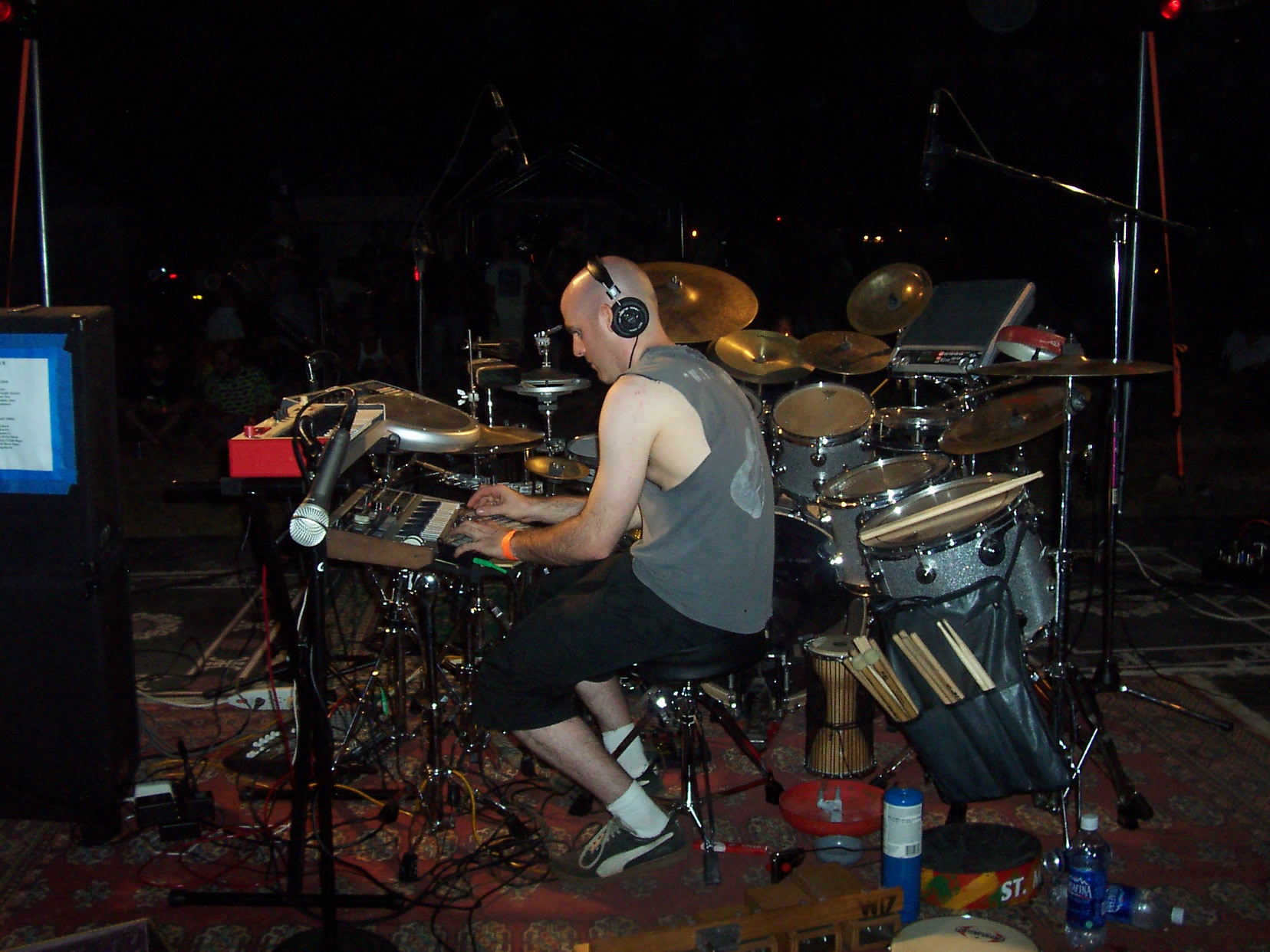
Soul Amputation performing at SoundQuilt Music Festival, August 25, 2006

In March 2005, Alicia Testa joined the band and added a new dynamic with her powerful vocals, keyboards, flute, and the 1980s-esque omnichords. This trio went into the studio in March 2005 and recorded a full-length, self-titled album. A common reaction to the album was an appreciation of the originality of its sound. High Times magazine described it as there being "no way to satisfactorily pigeonhole this music. Compositions will begin with fits of high energy, synthesized drumming, then dissipate and dissolve into a mellow and melodious groove then snap into something else...it is musical experimentation the mainstream frowns upon and its power is in keeping listeners on their toes." Music journalist Jesse Jarnow explained "they prove themselves steeped in the maximalist tradition — though not in a theatrical wanky way, and not in a jamband way, either. The music is almost all synthesized. If there's anything acoustic present, it just sounds like a really good imitation." Also in 2005, Steve began performing as a solo act under the name "Soul Amputation". This project allowed Steve to improvise on a drum kit while incorporating keyboards and other electronics.

=== 2007–2010 ===
This lineup of No Use For Humans includes Honoshowky, Mike Biskup on electric guitar, and Willy Carmona on trumpet, keyboards, and percussion. Biskup and Honoshowsky have history performing together, going back to the 1990s when they both performed in the NYC-based world/avant-garde band, In Petto. In June 2008, this lineup, including Sean Wegeler on keyboards, entered the studio and recorded the album An Index of Fecal-Oral Transmission. "The tracks of An Index of Fecal-Oral Transmission blend jazz-fusion and world-beat flourishes with soundtrack-style/ambient textures." According to the album's cover, "Since time existed, this planet's unseen organisms had wiped out billions of humans before they could earn their immunity to them. Bacteria is ever changing; ever evolving...This music was inspired by the little creatures humans infect each other with when they are affected by one another".

=== Solo NUFH ===
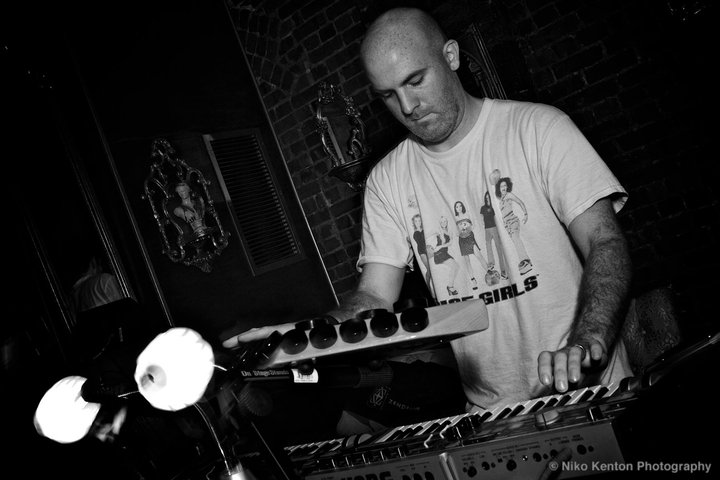
No Use For Humans performing at the WARPER Party - NYC Electronic Music, July 19, 2011

2011 found Steve shifting gears, moving from an evenly balanced acoustic and electronic mix to an almost all electronic presentation. "Live at Retromedia" serves as the debut release of this direction, and features a mostly solo Steve with a few NUFH alumni sitting in for a song or two. A vast repertoire of synth, percussion, keyboard, reverb, echo, and wave manipulation make the electronic orchestration a strong suit of this album. Following the release of "Retromedia", Steve was quick to enter the studio again, this time recruiting a core group of guests in a strictly collaborative effort. Not only does "Humanoids: A No Use For Humans Collective" contain some very deep electronic music, several tracks have him back behind the acoustic drums.

=== Daughter Vision ===
Formed in the winter of 2013, Steve and fellow NJ musician Brian Powell have teamed up to form the electro-pop power duo "Daughter Vision". Formed in late 2012, they released their self-titled debut under the NJ label Nacht Records. DV is known for having a visually stimulating live show as well as a mostly electronic, dance party sound.

== Equipment ==
=== Drums ===
- Pork Pie snare drum
- DW Soprano snare
- DW 6 piece Collector's Series
- Tama 5 piece Stagestar (depending on the gig)
- occasional original Tama Octobons

=== Cymbals ===
- 18" Zildjian Custom K Ride
- 16" Zildjian Trash China
- Hi-Hats= 14" Ziljian Field (top), 14" Ziljian Schimitar (bottom), 10" Zildjian Splash (top) 10" Sabian Neil Peart Paragon Splash (bottom)
- FX CYMBALS (various, interchangeable)
- Zildjian Trash Spiral
- Several 8" Stagg & LP cup chimes/icebells
- Zildjian Zilbells
- Sabian Will Calhoun Alien Disc
- various firebells and found objects

=== Other percussion ===
- Several hand made cowbells and gongs
- Zildjian gongs
- LP Talking Drum
- LP Udu
- kalimba
- bamboo, blocks, chains, caxixis, pandeiros, animal calls etc.

=== Electronics ===
- Boss Dr. Sample Samplers
- Roland Handsonic
- Roland SPD-S
- Roland V Drums
- Original Korg Wave Drum
- Alesis & Yamaha Electronic Drum Modules (often combined with triggers on found objects)
- Alesis Micron
- MicroKorg
- Boss loop Station
- Electro Harmonix Frequency Analyzer
- Korg Monotron
- Zendrum
- Digitech Whammy Pedal
- Korg Monotribe
- Korg Kaossilator
- Zendrum Zap
- Boss Digital Delay
- Mattel Synsonics

=== Bass ===
- Washburn Bass
- Fender P Bass

== Discography ==
No Use For Humans

- Just Another Solo Project (2003)
- No Use For Humans – Demo (2003)
- Lesson From A Dying Breed (2004)
- No Use For Humans DVD (2004)
- No Use For Humans (2005)
- An Index of Fecal-Oral Transmission (2006)
- Live at Retromedia (2011 - Nacht Records)
- Humanoids: A No Use For Humans Collective (2011 - Nacht Records)

Speak Softly and Carry a Big Stick

- Speak Softly and Carry a Big Stick Vol.1 (2009 - Nacht Records)
- Speak Softly and Carry a Big Stick Vol.2 (2010 - Nacht Records)

Soul Amputation

- Soul Amputation (2005)

Universal Rebel

- Overdog (2007)
- On The Shoulders of Giants (2010)

In Petto

- Live at the Knitting Factory (2001)
- In Petto EP (2003)

The Hungry Housewives

- Demo (2001)
- World Domestication (2001)
- Yum Yum Gimme Some (2002)

The South Jersey Seashore Lifeguard Convention Band

- Wave Goodbye (2005)
- The South Jersey Seashore Lifeguard Convention Band (2006)
- Lifeboat for Fatty (2010)

The Community

- The Project (2010)

Daylow

- Hyphen One & Daylow (2005)

Intense Men

- 100% Intense (2010 - Nacht Records)

Giggle the Ozone

- Charge (2010)
- Dreamjob (2012)

Ballroom

- Enter the Ballroom (2012 - Nacht Records)
- Genital Hospital (2014 - Nacht Records)

Sylvana Joyce & The Moment

- For You, Comrade (2012 - Nacht Records)

Daughter Vision

- Daughter Vision (2013 - Nacht Records)
- Accomplices (2014 - Nacht Records)
- Advanced Style (Soundtrack credit) - (2014 - Independent Release)

Billy Martin releases

- Life on Drums (2012 - Vongoe Films)
- Wandering (2014 - Amulet Records)
