= Paul Birnbaum =

American drummer

Paul Birnbaum was born July 17, 1967, in Boise, Idaho. He is best known for being the drummer of the early to late (active 1981–1986) eighties hardcore punk band Septic Death with the notorious artist Pushead.

== Career ==
During the later years of which he went to drum for the band Attitude Adjustment who by then had changed the band name to Attitude. Later in life he decided to go in a different direction and started a career as a professional body piercer making appearances in international body art magazines such as Savage. He currently owns his own tattoo/piercing shop, Imperial Body Art. After a 7-year break from music, due to a falling out with the nineties punk band he played guitar in Gordie Howe Trio Unit (also see: Haggis, Potato Potato), he regained his love of being in a band and now currently plays guitar in an early eighties influenced punk band called Little Miss and the No-Names (featuring the guitar player of Septic Death Jon Taylor) and drums in RAID (also featuring the guitar player from Septic Death Jon Taylor).
