= Benjamin Clapp =

American musician from Boise, Idaho

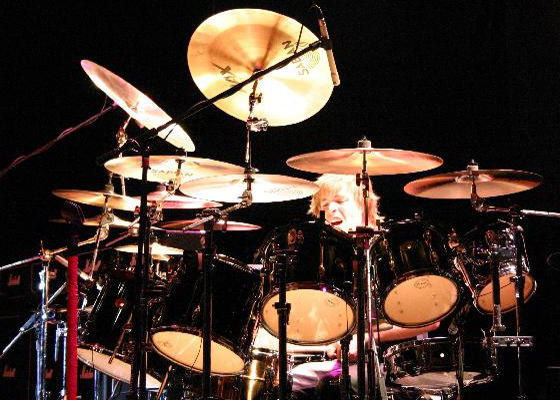
- Ben Clapp performing in 2004
- Born: October 13, 1977 (age 48); Boise, ID, U.S.
- Occupations: Musician; songwriter; photographer; cinematographer
- Years active: 1993–present
- Musical career
- Genres: rock, punk, reggae, experimental
- Instruments: Drums, junk percussion, trombone, guitar, electric bass, vocals
- Website: Benjamin Clapp official site

Benjamin Clapp (born October 13, 1977) is an American musician from Boise, Idaho. He has performed, composed, and recorded music with numerous artists, most notably Erik Sanko (The Lounge Lizards) and Skeleton Key, Tom Marshall (Phish) and Amfibian, Anthony Krizan (Spin Doctors), Jim Breuer, Kronos Quartet, Jesse Blaze Snider and Baptized By Fire, Dee Snider (Twisted Sister), Billy Martin (Medeski Martin and Wood), David Peel (The Lower East Side), and White Trash.

== Early life and education ==
At the age of eleven, Clapp began studying trombone in Idaho public schools. He studied privately under bass trombonist Mark Sellman for a number of years, and was awarded the Louis Armstrong Award in 1995, as well as performance awards at Boise State University and the Lionel Hampton International Jazz Festival. Meanwhile, he was self-learning to play drums; influenced early on by drummers Stewart Copeland, Lars Ulrich, and Dale Crover.

== Career ==
=== 1993-2000 ===
In 1993, Clapp joined Boise punk band, Haggis, following ex-Septic Death drummer Paul Birnbaum's departure from the band. The band went on to tour the West Coast, and release a number of singles and compilation tracks internationally, including the vinyl only 1995 release Step Into It, on German record label, Bilharziose. Through the next several years, Clapp was involved with a number of independent music projects in Boise, and went on to collaborate again with members of Haggis - this time with inclusion of Birnbaum. Clapp was a founding member of the Adversives and the Mosquitones, and performed on all of their recorded releases and national tours.

Clapp formed independent record label Spudtown Records in 1995, and released the vinyl only compilation 12 Songs You Won't Like By 12 Bands You've Never Heard of From Boise, Idaho. The label continued working with regional bands to release their EPs and albums under the moniker STMC (Spudtown Music Collective) until Clapp relocated to the East Coast.

=== 2001-present ===
In early 2001, Clapp moved to New York City, and within months was hired on as drummer for a Warsaw Poland Brothers US tour, performing for the first time with the band in New Orleans with no audition or rehearsal. Later the same year he moved to New Jersey and became active in the music scene fostered by legendary promoter/performer Jack Monahan, at the Brighton Bar. He was invited to join the Do Dads, who would then go on to 3 Asbury Park Music Award nominations.

By recommendation from rock photographer Mark Weiss to Twisted Sister frontman Dee Snider, Clapp was introduced to Snider's eldest son Jesse Blaze Snider in 2004, and they went on to perform together as Blazed, and from 2006 to 2008 as Baptized By Fire. Clapp also joined Erik Sanko's band Skeleton Key in 2004 as their "junk percussionist", and became further recognized for his use of non-traditional percussion: "...the real dirty work's done by brutish showman Benjamin Clapp. He chucks broken cymbals up into the air and slugs them on their way down. He has the worlds [sic] most dangerous tambourine: A rectangular frame, I'm guessing 36" x 24", with CIRCULAR SAW BLADES strung on it." Skeleton Key continued to tour the United States and Canada with Clapp in the band, and recorded songs which would eventually go on to limited release as The Lyons Quintette EP.

Among a number of studio projects and touring artists that hire Clapp to perform on stage and in the studio, Phish lyricist Tom Marshall and his band Amfibian feature Clapp's trombone playing on their studio albums From the Ether and Skip the Goodbyes. Clapp's trombone playing is also a fixture in the current line-up for Elektra Records recording artists: White Trash, and is heard on their 2009 release 3-D Monkeys In Space.

== Discography ==
- 1994 - Bitter (with Haggis) credit: drums
- 1994 - Encyclopedia of Post Punk Hits (with Haggis) credit: drums
- 1995 - 20 Bands Trash 20 Songs to Find The Way to Sesame Street v/a compilation (with Haggis) credit: drums
- 1995 - Toiletbowl Epiphonies (with The Mosquitones) credit: trombone
- 1995 - Wade Free Wherever v/a compilation (with Haggis) credit: drums
- 1995 - Step Into It (with Haggis) credit: drums
- 1995 - Drunk and Disorderly (with Haggis) credit: drums
- 1995 - 12 Songs You Won't Like by 12 Bands You've Never Heard Of v/a compilation (with Haggis) credit: drums
- 1995 - 12 Songs You Won't Like by 12 Bands You've Never Heard Of v/a compilation (with the Adversives) credit: vocals, guitar
- 1996 - The Search For Roger Ferris (with Adversives) credit: vocals, guitar
- 1996 - The Dread/The Adversives Split 10" (with the Adversives) credit: vocals, guitar
- 1996 - Wood Panel Pacer Wagon With Mags v/a compilation (with Haggis) credit: drums
- 1997 - Liverache: Tales From the Liver's Edge v/a compilation (with Haggis) credit: drums
- 1997 - Cause/The Adversives Split 7" (with the Adversives) credit: vocals, guitar
- 1997 - Making Human Junk v/a compilation (with the Adversives) credit: vocals, guitar
- 1997 - Mosquitones (with Mosquitones) credit: trombone
- 1998 - Coolidge 50 v/a compilation (with Haggis) credit: drums
- 1999 - Smile Upon The Children (with Diseased Media Society) credit: trombone
- 1999 - Dance of the Dishwasher (with Los Mosquitones) credit: trombone
- 1999 - Shotgun Response - Alliance In Defiance/The Adversives (with the Adversives) credit: vocals, guitar
- 2000 - Adversives (with the Adversives) credit: vocals, guitar
- 2001 - I Can't Sleep and I'm Never Awake (with The Unit Breed) credit: drums
- 2001 - Boise, Idaho v/a compilation (with Mosquitones) credit: drums
- 2004 - Live 1997-2003 (with Warsaw Poland Brothers) credit: drums
- 2004 - From the Ether (with Amfibian) credit: trombone
- 2004 - Highland at Euclid (with Mosquitones) credit: drums
- 2004 - Live at the Metro (with Skeleton Key) credit: trombone, junk percussion
- 2005 - Mermaid Parade (with the DoDads) credit: trombone
- 2005 - Now The Party Starts (with Blazed) credit: drums
- 2005 - The Lyons Quintette EP (with Skeleton Key) credit: trombone, junk percussion
- 2006 - Butterbrain (with Butterbrain) credit: trombone
- 2006 - Best of Ska and Rocksteady (with Warsaw Poland Brothers) credit: drums
- 2006 - Juggernaut EP (with Baptized By Fire) credit: drums
- 2007 - Flesheaters v/a compilation (with Baptized By Fire) credit: drums
- 2007 - Eclectric (with Sunny Daze) credit: trombone
- 2007 - Skip The Goodbyes (with Amfibian) credit: trombone
- 2007 - First To Fight (with Warsaw Poland Brothers) credit: drums
- 2008 - Code Red (with J-Henry) credit: trombone
- 2009 - Jayder (with Jayder) credit: drums
- 2009 - 3D Monkeys In Space (with White Trash) credit: trombone
- 2009 - Tales From Dirty Jersey (with Barry and the Penetrators) credit: trombone
- 2009 - The Long Evening (with Keith Monacchio) credit: trombone
- 2010 - Tropism (with Jesse Urmey) credit: trombone
- 2010 - Speak Softly and Carry a Big Stick (Vol. 1) (with Steve Honoshowsky) credit: drums
- 2012 - Gravity is the Enemy (with Skeleton Key) credit: trombone, junk percussion
- 2012 - Full Fathom 5 (with Tony Todesco & Full Fathom 5) credit: trombone
- 2015 - Suburban Purgatory (with White Trash) credit: trombone
- 2015 - Together at Last (with The Shady Street Show Band and Hot Blood) credit: trombone
- 2018 - The In Part of the Out Crowd (with Acid) credit: drums
- 2019 - Butterbrain - The EP (with Butterbrain) credit: trombone
- 2020 - West Coast vs. East Coast: Public Serpents/Upper Downer split (with Public Serpents) credit: trombone
- 2020 - Public Serpents / Escape From The Zoo split (with Public Serpents) credit: trombone
- 2021 - Glamdemic! (with Space Panther) credit: drums
