= Baptized by fire (disambiguation) =

Baptized by fire is a Christian theological concept.

Baptized by fire or Baptized by Fire may also refer to:

- Baptized by Fire (band) an American rock band
- "Baptized by Fire" (Spinnerette song), a 2009 song by Spinnerette
- "Baptized by Fire", a song by Hirax from the 2009 album El Rostro de la Muerte
- "Baptized by Fire", a song by Winger from the 1990 album In the Heart of the Young
- "Baptized by Fire", a song by Znowhite from the 1988 album Act of God
- Baptized by Fire, a 1994 album by Dave Bonney

== See also ==
- Baptism of Fire (disambiguation)
