= Alesis Ion =

Synthesizer made by Alesis between 2003 and 2007

Ion
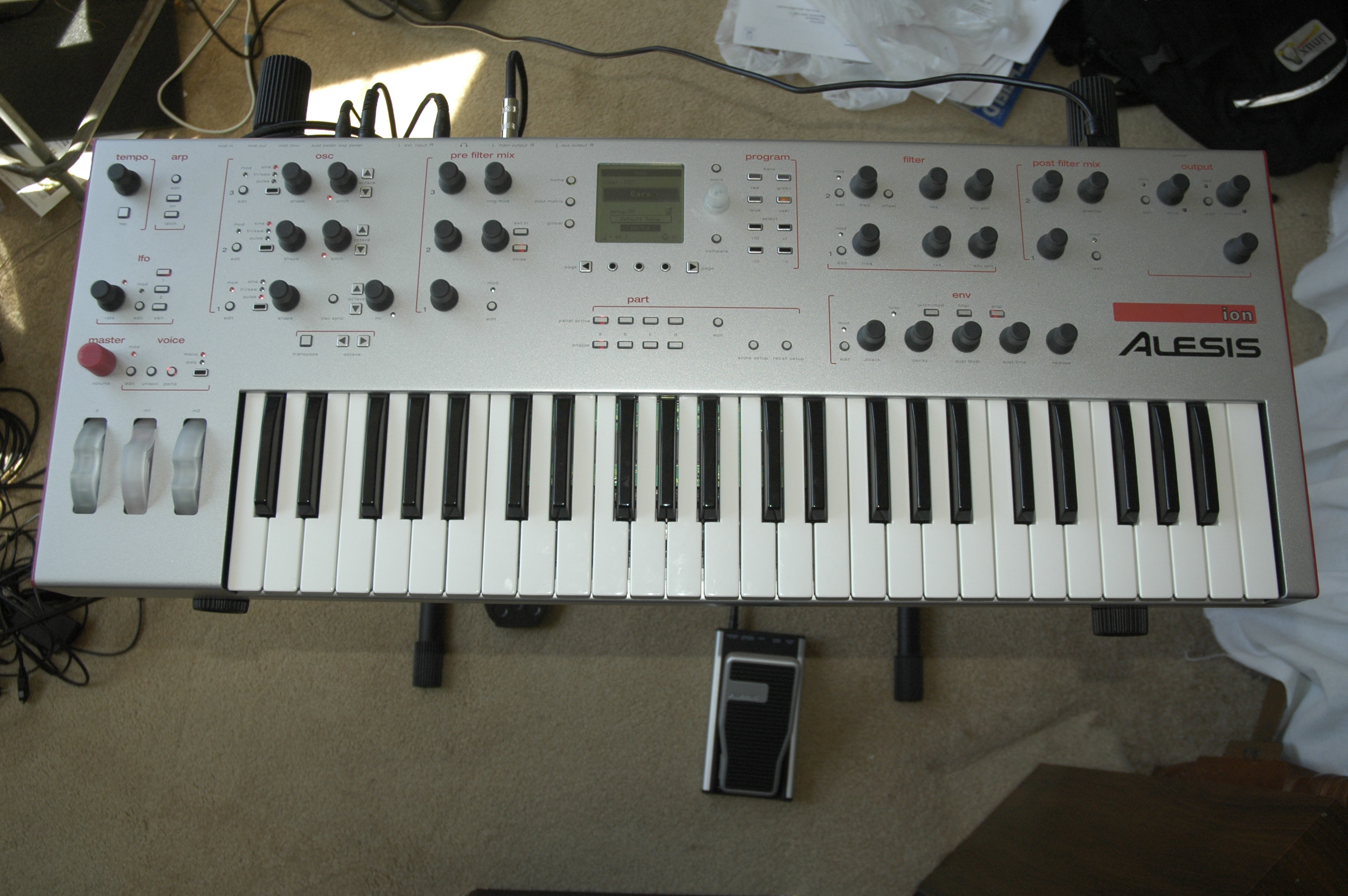
- Manufacturer: Alesis
- Dates: 2003-2007
- Price: $679 US

Technical specifications
- Polyphony: 8 note
- Timbrality: 4 part
- Oscillator: 3
- LFO: 2
- Synthesis type: Virtual analog Subtractive
- Filter: 17 types
- Attenuator: 1
- Effects: 4

Input/output
- Keyboard: 49 key
- Left-hand control: 3× Wheel

The Alesis Ion is an analog modeling synthesizer. It was announced during the NAMM Summer Session in 2002. Unlike the Alesis Andromeda, Alesis's analog synthesizer, its sounds are synthesized using DSP chips to mimic the sound of analog audio circuitry and components.

== Features ==
The Ion has several features that make it stand apart from other analog modeling synthesizers. Most importantly, it features a selection of emulations of classic analog filter models of synthesizers such as the Moog Minimoog, Oberheim SEM, the Roland TB-303, the ARP 2600 and the Roland Jupiter-8. Besides these emulations (which carry euphemistic names due to trademark issues), it has a series of filter models that are not commonly found on most synthesizers, such as formant and comb filters. This vastly increases the sonic range; most virtual analogs have only a single multimode filter (usually featuring low-pass, high-pass and band-pass modes) which was either designed from scratch or "inspired by" an existing "famous" filter model. The fact that two of these filters can be used in a parallel or serial configuration adds to the sound design possibilities.

Besides the selection of filters, it has an extensive modulation matrix. This allows the user to route a source (such as an LFO) to various targets with an adjustable intensity. The Ion's extensive "Mod Matrix" rivals the routing options of some voltage-controlled modular synthesizers.

While most virtual analog synthesizers are equipped with on-board effects, the Ion lacks two important ones; reverb and a long delay (the on-board delay only has 80ms of delay time). These are often used on synthesizers to add some atmosphere to what would otherwise be a "dry" sound.

One feature that also sets it apart from other virtual analog synthesizers, is the high resolution of the endless rotating front panel knobs yielding a more precise real-time tweaking experience. This high resolution eliminates all "stair stepping" or quantization of parameter value changes. These are not encoders, but real endless potentiometers.

The Ion's keyboard has velocity sensitivity, but not aftertouch. However, the sound engine is capable of responding to both channel and polyphonic aftertouch messages received via MIDI. This feature means that with an external polyphonic aftertouch keyboard controller, the Ion can be made to modulate notes individually with finger pressure.

== Alesis Micron ==
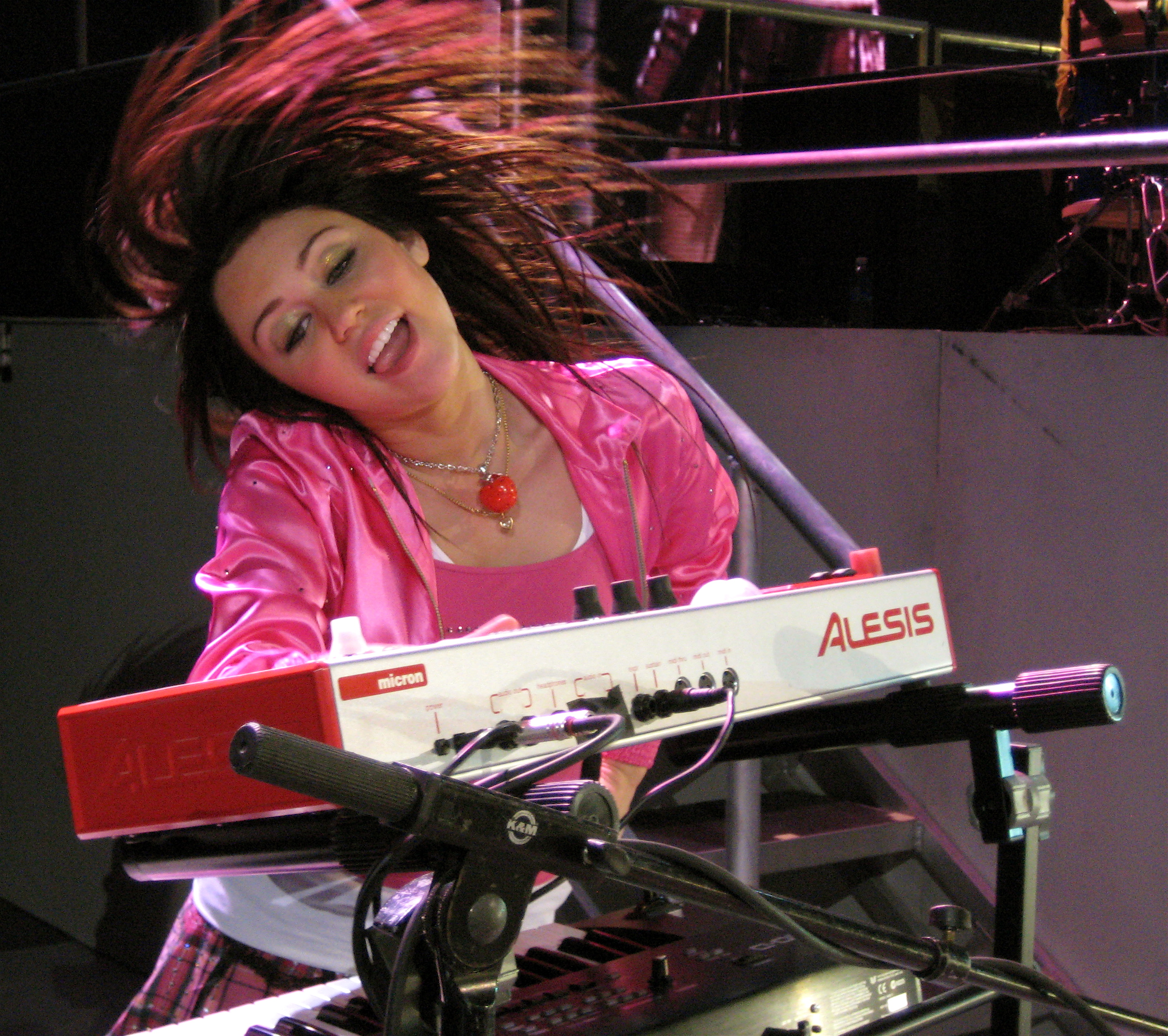
Alesis Micron played by Miley Cyrus

The little brother of the Ion is the Alesis Micron, which is extremely compact and portable. It came out in 2004 with almost the same synthesis engine and the same metal/plastic housing style as the Ion, but with only 37 keys and fewer knobs and buttons. It boasts reverb, long delay, and a pattern sequencer. Sound patches for the Ion can be used on the Micron and vice versa. The Micron's user interface features many shortcuts and is quite deep, offering users the ability to edit all of the sound engine's parameters. However, due to the lack of knobs on its control surface compared to the Ion, specialised Micron patch editor software has been made for various platforms to enable easier sound sculpting from a computer via MIDI.

== Akai Miniak ==
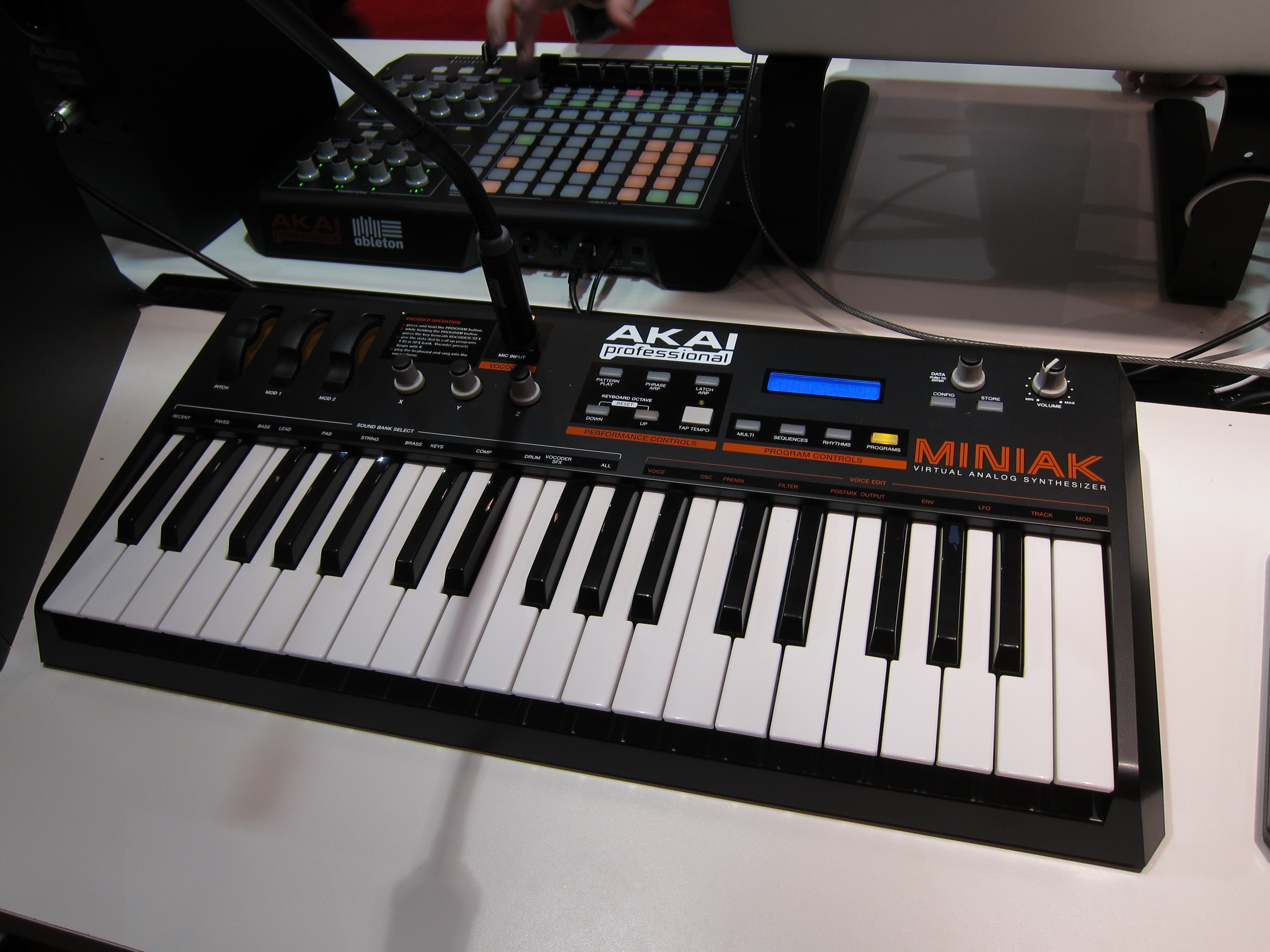
AKAI MINIAK

In 2009, Alesis's partner Akai released its Akai Miniak, which has the same sound engine as the Micron, but in a differently styled plastic housing, with three modulation wheels instead of the Micron's two sliders plus one wheel, and with a different set of presets. Unlike the Micron, the Miniak standard came with a gooseneck microphone. Pricing of the Miniak was substantially - typically 50% - higher upon release than the Micron's. In mid-2010 the price was dropped drastically.

== Users ==
The Ion is used by:

- Klaus Schulze
- Pedro the Lion (on their Achilles Heel LP)
- Still Flyin'
- The Killers
- Oneohtrix Point Never (Daniel Lopatin on Instrumental Tourist)
- Hans Zimmer
- Andrew Horowitz

The Micron is used by:

- Nine Inch Nails
- Steve Honoshowsky
- System of a Down
- Bloodhound Gang
- Ashlee Simpson
- Gym Class Heroes
- Tegan and Sara
- Times New Viking
- The Brave Little Abacus
- The Veronicas
- Walk the Moon
- Motion City Soundtrack
