= Amfibian =

American musical project

- Genres: Rock
- Years active: 1999–2001, 2004–2007
- Spinoff of: Phish, Bivouac Jaun
- Past members: Tom Marshall; Scott Metzger; Andrew Southern; Matt Kohut; Pete Cottone; JP Wasicko; Anthony Krizan; Chris Metaxas; Benjamin Clapp; Mark Varga; Joe Larsen; C.C. Coletti; Bob Kay; John Korba; John Hummel; Kevin Hummel; Thorp Rivingston; Todd Lanka
- Website: http://www.amfibian.com/

Amfibian is an American musical project led by Phish lyricist Tom Marshall.

== History ==
Future members of the band appeared on Marshall's 2000 solo album Amfibian Tales, after which Marshall (on vocals and keyboards) officially formed Amfibian as a proper band. The group initially included guitarists Scott Metzger and Andrew Southern, bassist Matt Kohut (formerly toured with Ween), and drummers Pete Cottone and JP Wasicko. The group played a series of concerts in 2001, including a benefit for murdered Phish fan Kristin Laurite at the Stone Pony in Asbury Park, New Jersey. The show, hosted by Kevin Cassels of The Pharmer's Almanac, was to be released as a live album, but Marshall temporarily retired Amfibian at the end of the year.

Three years later in 2004, Marshall reformed a completely new Amfibian with guitarist/vocalist/keyboardist Chris Metaxas, drummer Joe Larsen, bassist Bob Kay as well as guitarist Anthony Krizan, and released the band's first studio album, From the Ether, in the spring. The band went their separate ways after eight months of touring the U.S. east coast.

In the fall of 2006, Marshall and Anthony Krizan returned with three new members for Skip The Goodbyes, released on Relix Records in June 2007. The album features Phish leader Trey Anastasio, as well as contributions from former Amfibian members Chris Metaxas, Benjamin Clapp, Mark Varga, and Thorp Rivingston.

The son of keyboardist John Korba died in a car accident in November 2007. This and other circumstances caused Amfibian to take a hiatus of indefinite length. Tom Marshall spent much of Spring 2008 in collaborative writing sessions with longtime friend and partner Trey Anastasio at Anastasio's studio in upstate New York, partially in preparation for Phish's 2009 album release, Joy.

== Discography ==
- From the Ether (2004)
- Skip the Goodbyes (June 17, 2007)
