= Michael Eric Robinson =

Michael Robinson
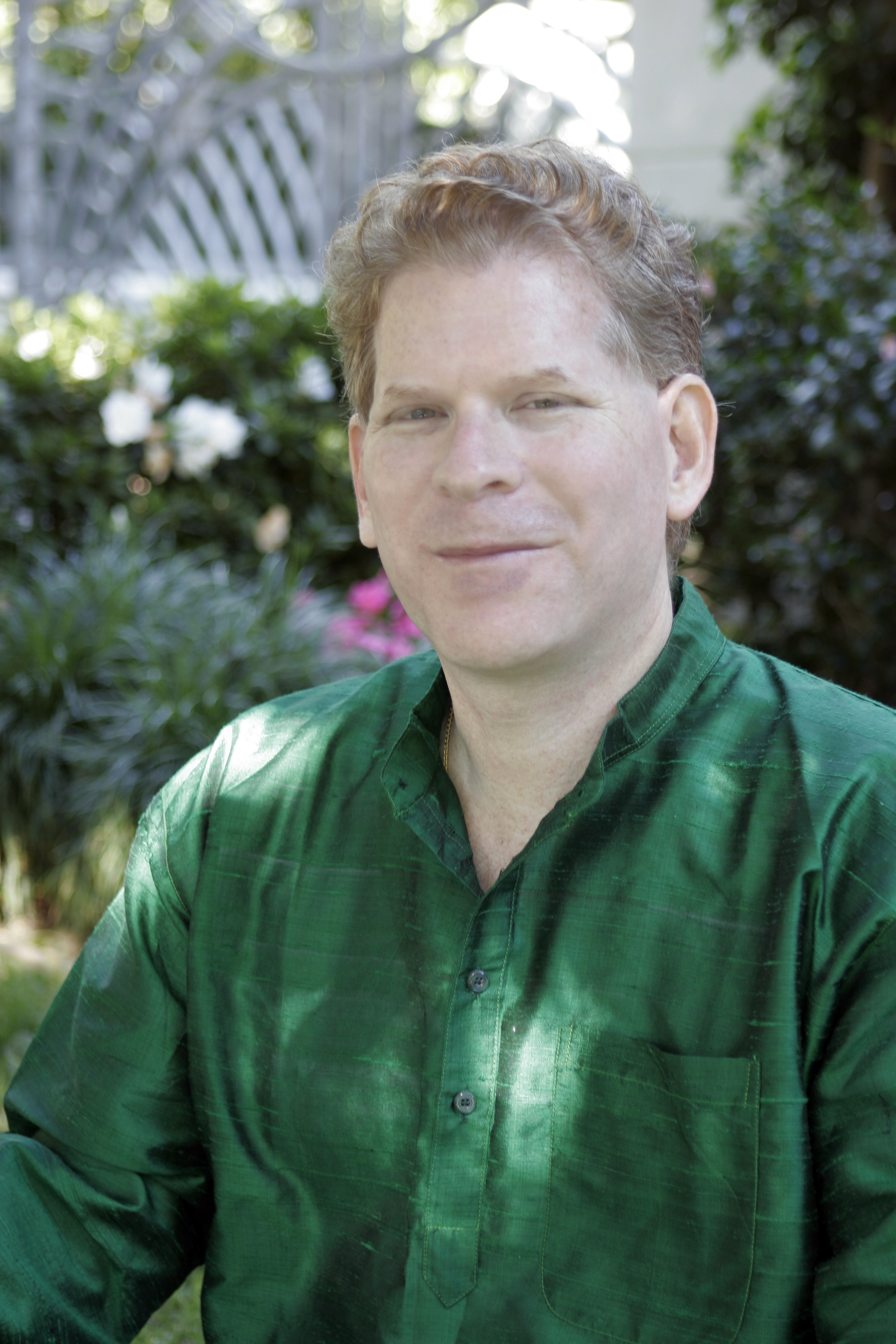

Background information
- Born: Michael Eric Robinson; March 11, 1956; New York, New York
- Died: June 29, 2026 (aged 70)
- Genres: Jazz, Contemporary classical, Indian classical music
- Occupations: Composer, Musician, Musicologist
- Instruments: Piano, Computer
- Years active: 1984-2026
- Label: Azure Miles Records
- Website: http://www.azuremilesrecords.com

Michael Eric Robinson (March 11, 1956 - June 29, 2026) was an American composer associated with both contemporary classical music and computer music. His work is influenced by jazz, Indian classical music and European musical traditions.

== Life ==
Born in New York, New York, in 1956, Robinson was raised in Long Island, NY, earning the Louis Armstrong award in 1974. Robinson studied at SUNY Potsdam (with a BM in Composition from the Crane School of Music) followed by graduate study at CalArts. Private studies included jazz improvisation with Lee Konitz, Paul Jeffrey, Ken McIntyre and Indian classical music with Harihar Rao and Pandit Jasraj - as well as composition studies with John Cage, Morton Feldman, David Lewin, Charles Dodge and Steve Reich. Additional education included summer programs at Tanglewood with Leonard Altman, Gunther Schuller, Jacob Druckman, John Chowning, Ralph Shapey and Leonard Bernstein.

As a composer and musicologist, Robinson has been a lecturer at UCLA, Bard College, California State University at Long Beach and California State University at Dominguez Hills. His recordings are in the music library collections of New York University, Princeton University, and the University of California at Los Angeles. A comprehensive collection of Robinson’s scores are used for study and teaching purposes at New York University.

== Composition style and process ==
Robinson's work has been described by Titus Levi as a musical rendering of abstract expressionism. In Keyboard Magazine he explains in his 1991 Discoveries article featuring Robinson: "Robinson’s sense of timing, phrasing, form, and flow guide listeners toward his alternative vision. His music has the clarity and ingenuousness of Chinese brush painting, some of the hard geometric edginess of Kandinsky, and a detached, ethereal, and abstract quality that nonetheless seems bound to the tight forms found in some abstract Expressionist paintings."

Christina V. Godbey of The Los Angeles Times (May 30, 1992) wrote of Robinson’s process: “Michael Robinson is a composer of the modern age...Since 1985, he has written compositions exclusively for the computer, and it has produced some rather unusual sounds. Robinson composes music with traditional notations on paper before it is translated and encoded into the computer.”

Amanda MacBlane describes Michael Robinson's style and process in her August 2002 NewMusicBox article: "Making use of alternative tunings and blending tradition with technology, Robinson is able to transcend cultural and spiritual boundaries."

Robinson has composed over 400 works and has released over 100 albums. His musical style is informed by American, South Asian, and European traditions. "...his production methodology also stood out: although the performance of a typical Robinson piece sounds as if spontaneous improvisation is involved, his compositions are entirely created using the Meruvina. And thus fully notated.”

== Piano improvisations ==
Known for his electronic works on the Meruvina, Michael Robinson is also an accomplished pianist, releasing three solo piano albums in 2021. As published in All About Jazz, Hrayr Attarian describes his piano recordings as: "A mix of originals and radically reimagined standards..."

== Selected discography ==
- Green Garnets (Azure Miles Records) 2022
- Jetavana (Azure Miles Records) 2022
- Gregorian Winter (Azure Miles Records) 2022
- Joy Unknown (Azure Miles Records) 2022
- Another World (Azure Miles Records) 2022
- In My Tree (Azure Miles Records) 2022
- A Parrot Sipping Tea (Azure Miles Records) 2021
- Taffeta Patterns (Azure Miles Records) 2021
- Lotus-Pollen (Azure Miles Records) 2020
- The Waters' Child (Azure Miles Records) 2020
- Queen Of Space (Azure Miles Records) 2020
- Spirit Lady (Azure Miles Records) 2019
- Dazzling Darkness (Azure Miles Records) 2019
- Tunis Phantom (Azure Miles Records) 2019
- Nectar-Spells (Azure Miles Records) 2018
- Mango-Bird (Azure Miles Records) 2018
- Viridian Seas (Azure Miles Records) 2017
- Lilac Dawn (Azure Miles Records) 2017
- Celestial Crocodile & Honu Morning (Azure Miles Records) 2016
- Hummingbird Canyon (Azure Miles Records) 2014
- Lucknow Shimmer (Azure Miles Records) 2013
- Nightmarchers (Azure Miles Records) 2012
- Emerald Anklets (Azure Miles Records) 2012
- Amethyst Labyrinth (Azure Miles Records) 2011
- Peridot Pond (Azure Miles Records) 2011
- Summer Morning (Azure Miles Records) 2010
- Bhairava (Azure Miles Records) 2010
- Todi (Azure Miles Records) 2009
- Natabhairavi (Azure Miles Records) 2007
- Dhani (Azure Miles Records) 2003
- Mian Ki Malhar (Azure Miles Records) 2002
- Puriya Dhanashri (Azure Miles Records) 2002
- Bhimpalasi (Azure Miles Records) 2001
- Kaunsi Kanada (Azure Miles Records) 2000
- Sagarmatha (Azure Miles Records) 1998
- The Listening Earth (Azure Miles Records) 1998
- Chinese Legend (Azure Miles Records) 1997
- Rainbow Thunder (Azure Miles Records) 1996
- Hamoa (Azure Miles Records) 1995
- Fire Monkey (Azure Miles Records) 1994
- Robinson Gardens (Azure Miles Records) 1994
- Sea of France (Azure Miles Records) 1991
- Trembling Flowers (Azure Miles Records) 1991
