= Alesis Quadrasynth =

Synthesizer

Quadrasynth
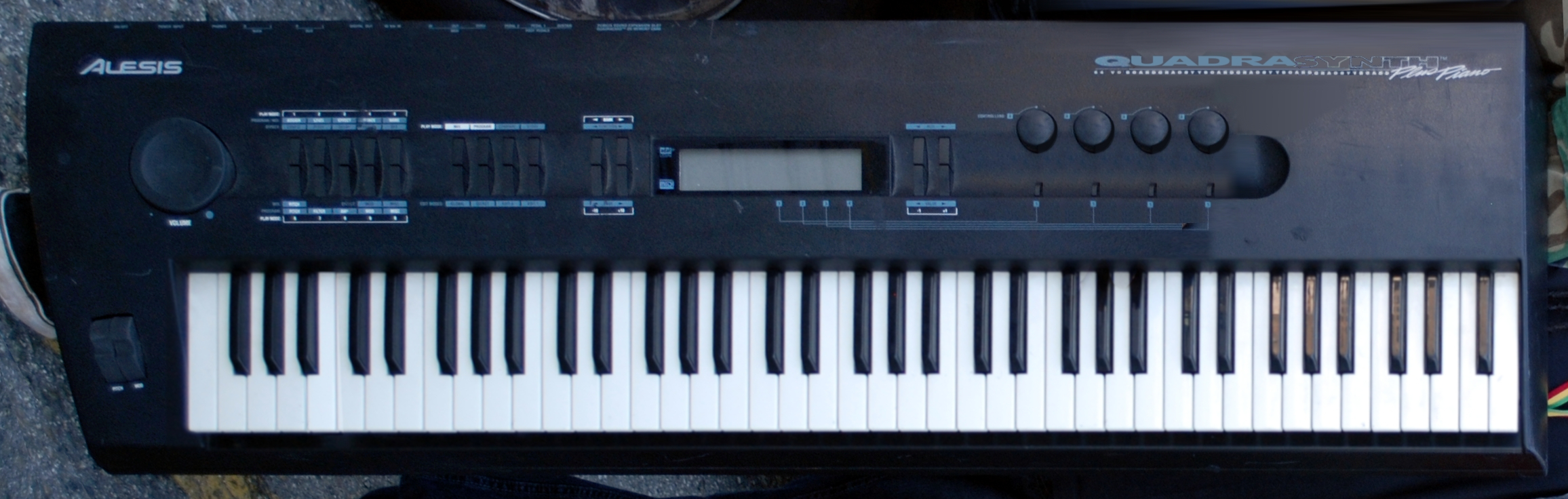
- Alesis Quadrasynth
- Manufacturer: Alesis
- Price: £1499 GBP

Technical specifications
- Polyphony: 64-note polyphonic 1 sound programs 32-note polyphonic 2 sound programs 16-note polyphonic 4 sound programs
- Timbrality: 16-part multi-timbral
- Aftertouch expression: Yes
- Velocity expression: Yes
- Storage memory: QS: 128 preset 128 user programs, 100 preset, 100 user mixes QS Plus: 512 preset 128 user programs, 400 preset, 100 user mixes
- Effects: 4-part multi-effectual (4 FX at once)

Input/output
- Keyboard: 76 keys
- External control: MIDI, 2 programmable pedal Controllers

The Alesis Quadrasynth is a 76-key, 64-note polyphonic PCM sample-based digital subtractive synthesizer first introduced in 1993. It was Alesis's first major foray into synthesizer production.

== Function ==
In the Quadrasynth's composite synthesis system, up to four "tones" are used to create a single "patch" or synthesizer sound. These individual "tones" are created by using 16-bit digital single-cycle waveforms or digital samples as oscillator sources, and are then processed via a digital non-resonant filter, various LFOs and envelope generators, and so on - in the usual manner. The Quadrasynth contained 16MB of ROM containing PCM-based waveforms and samples, with the option of expanding the sample base via PCMCIA expansion cards which plug into the back of the synthesizer.

A "patch" on the Quadrasynth can contain 1, 2, 3 or 4 of these tones. However, polyphony decreases as more tones are used. For example, a 1-tone patch would have 64-note polyphony, a 2-tone patch would have 32-note polyphony, and a 4-tone patch would only have 16-note polyphony. Patches can only be stored in the User bank. All other banks are factory presets which cannot be overwritten. The Quadrasynth was typical of synthesizers of the early 90s, featuring a digital, menu-based editing system. Editing user patches could be tedious if the user is unfamiliar with its complex editing structure or has not read the manual.

A multitimbral "mix" (or "performance") can contain up to 16 parts (patches). Each part can respond to the full range of the keyboard or to a configured subrange, which allows for layering and splitting. Each patch in a mix corresponds to a different MIDI channel, so that the Quadrasynth can become a multitimbral playback device for external sequencers or MIDI file players. The Quadrasynth also had a 4-bus multi effects processor, which is based on Alesis' own Quadraverb 2 stand-alone effects processor. A main function of the synthesizer is its ability to output in Quadraphonic, on the rear of the keyboard.
