= Amfibian Tales =

Studio album by Tom Marshall and Co.
- Released: 2000
- Recorded: 2000
- Genre: Rock
- Producer: Tom Marshall

Amfibian chronology
Amfibian Tales (2000)	From the Ether (2004)

Amfibian Tales is an album by Phish lyricist Tom Marshall, who also handles lead vocals and keyboards on the album. Officially billed under "Tom Marshall and Co.," the disc includes a number of special guests, including Matt Kohut (formerly of Ween), Scott Metzger, old friend Pete Cottone (who played drums on "Slave to the Traffic Light" on Phish's debut album in 1986), and New Jersey duo The Sarahs, who sing lead vocals on "Nothing," a track written by Marshall and Trey Anastasio that eventually found its way onto Phish's eleventh studio album, Undermind.

Shortly after the album's release, Marshall would form an official band called Amfibian, who would release From the Ether in 2004.

== Track listing ==
1. "Appreciate"
2. "Flight"
3. "Onion"
4. "Spin"
5. "Dream Satellite"
6. "In Case You Didn't Know It"
7. "Eggshells"
8. "It Has to Be"
9. "Mud"
10. "Salamander Spread"
11. "Taciturn"
12. "Anchorage"
13. "Fail to Wait"
14. "Mermaids"
15. "Nothing"
16. "Sleep as it Grows"
