= Baptized by Fire =

American rock band

- Also known as: BXF, Baptized X Fire
- Origin: New York City
- Genres: Rock
- Years active: 2006–2008
- Members: Jesse Blaze Snider; Danny Wacker; Dan Carlisle; Benjamin Clapp

Baptized by Fire was an American rock band from the greater New York area, formed in 2006. The band consisted of Jesse Blaze Snider, Danny Wacker, Dan Carlisle, and Benjamin Clapp.

== History ==
=== Band history ===
The band was formed in 2006 upon the foundation of Jesse Blaze Snider's band Blazed, which at the time included drummer Benjamin Clapp and bassist Dan Carlisle. Upon discovery of guitarist Danny Wacker, the band officially took on the name Baptized By Fire.

The newly named group completed their first studio recording; from which four songs were self-released in 2007 as the Juggernaut EP. Notable credits in production of the EP include production by Denny McNerney, and mastering by Bob Lanzner and Ratt's Stephen Pearcy.

== Musical characteristics ==
=== Genre ===
The primary musical genres that comprise the sound of Baptized By Fire's music, are heavy metal and punk rock. A great deal of the song lyrics present a forcefully positive mind-set, and vociferous self-worth. As an avid fan of comic books, lyricist Jesse Blaze Snider often alludes to the colossal strength of superheroes and characters of fantasy by relating their immortality to real life scenarios.

=== Band name ===
Baptized By Fire was also known by the abbreviation "BXF", wherein the "X" replaces the word "by" as in dimensional mark-ups such as "2x4" or "8x10".

The band's name itself is considered wordplay stemmed from vocalist Jesse Blaze Snider's middle name, as much as it is a reference to the difficult process by which the band was formed. Before cementing the final line-up that would become Baptized By Fire, Jesse had spent many years auditioning and dismissing countless musicians. Further disaster shook up the beginnings of the band on August 12, 2003 when the-then drummer, Kris Dalene, was killed in an automobile accident.

== Band members ==
=== Current members ===
- Jesse Blaze Snider - vocals
- Danny Wacker - guitar
- Dan Carlisle - bass guitar
- Benjamin Clapp - drums

== Discography ==
- Juggernaut EP Compact Disc EP (2007)
