= Baptism of Fire =

Baptism of fire is a Christian theological concept.

Baptism of Fire may also refer to:

- Baptism of Fire (1940 film), a 1940 German propaganda film about the destruction of Warsaw
- Baptism of Fire (1943 film), a 1943 American documentary film
- Baptism of Fire (1952 film), a 1952 Hungarian drama film
- Baptism of Fire (novel), a 1996 novel by Andrzej Sapkowski
  - Baptism of Fire, an episode in the TV series partly based on the novel
- Baptism of Fire: The Second Battle of Ypres and the Forging of Canada, April 1915, a 2007 book by Nathan M. Greenfield

== See also ==
- Baptizm of Fire, a 1997 album by Glenn Tipton
- Baptized by fire (disambiguation)
