= White Trash (American band) =

American funk/hard rock/soul band

- Origin: Queens, New York, US
- Genres: Funk, hard rock, soul
- Years active: 1985–1995, 2007–2021
- Label: Elektra Records
- Members: Dave Alvin; Aaron Collins; Chris Arbisi; Brendan Stiles; Terry Thomas; Dave Barckow; Marc Pincus
- Past members: Ethan Collins; Mike Caldarella; Eric Brodin; Craig LeBlang
- Website: Official website

White Trash is an American funk/hard rock/soul band from Queens, New York, billed as "Four college dropouts with an attitude ... and a horn section". They separate themselves from other bands in their genre with their horn section, called the Badass Brass, which gives them a very funky musical sound. They enjoyed some success in the early 90s before disbanding. They later reformed and released several more albums and toured the U.S. White Trash was heavily influenced by Mötley Crüe and The Blues Brothers.

== History ==
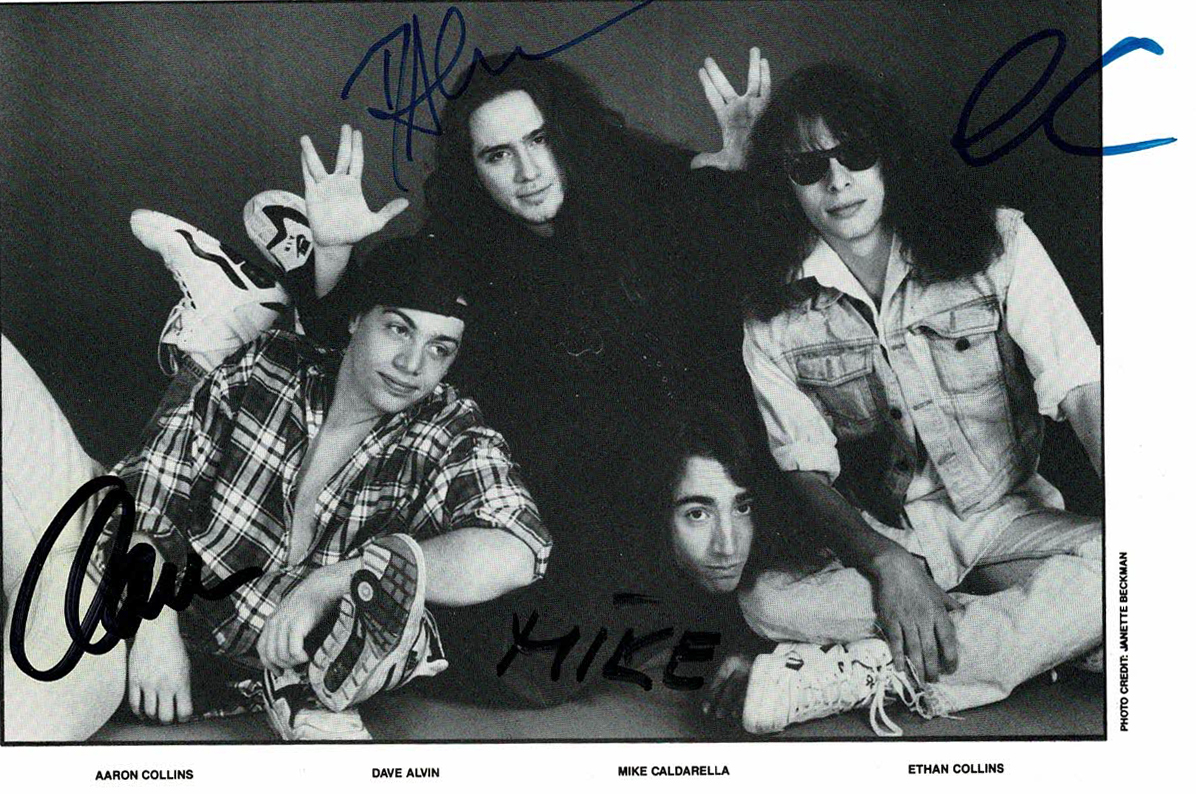
White Trash promotional photo, 1991

Friends Dave Alvin (vocals) and brothers Ethan (guitar) and Aaron Collins (bass) formed the band in 1985 and first played together at Aaron's bar mitzvah, performing covers of Judas Priest's "Breaking The Law" and "Living After Midnight". They used several different drummers until three years later, when Aaron's high school buddy Mike Caldarella joined. In 1990 they were discovered and subsequently signed to EMI Music Publishing. They signed to Elektra Records in 1991 and released their self-titled debut album that same year, which was produced by George Drakoulias and engineered by Brendan O'Brien.

The album was fairly successful, featuring cover artwork by Jack Davis of MAD Magazine and fueled by the video for "Apple Pie", which was in heavy rotation on MTV's Buzz Bin. The song reached No. 39 on Billboard's Hot Mainstream Rock Tracks chart, while the album charted at No. 122 on the Billboard 200. Despite this, they decided to split up because the Collins brothers and Caldarella were not happy with the musical direction the band was headed. While the band was on hiatus, the other single from their album, "The Crawl", was used as the theme song for MTV's The Jon Stewart Show in 1993.

Alvin continued White Trash with an entirely new lineup in 1993. Craig LeBlang took over guitar duties, Eric Brodin handled the bass, and Dave Barckow sat behind the drum kit. The band began touring again, including opening for Kiss in Burbank, California in September. They released the album ¿Sí O Sí, Que? in 1994, produced by Daniel Rey (Ramones, White Zombie, King Missile). Two singles were released from the album ("Minor Happiness" and "Pig") and a tour with New Jersey band Spare Change, but by the time the album came out the music scene had changed radically due to influence of grunge rock and White Trash was viewed as too old school to be viable in the music industry.

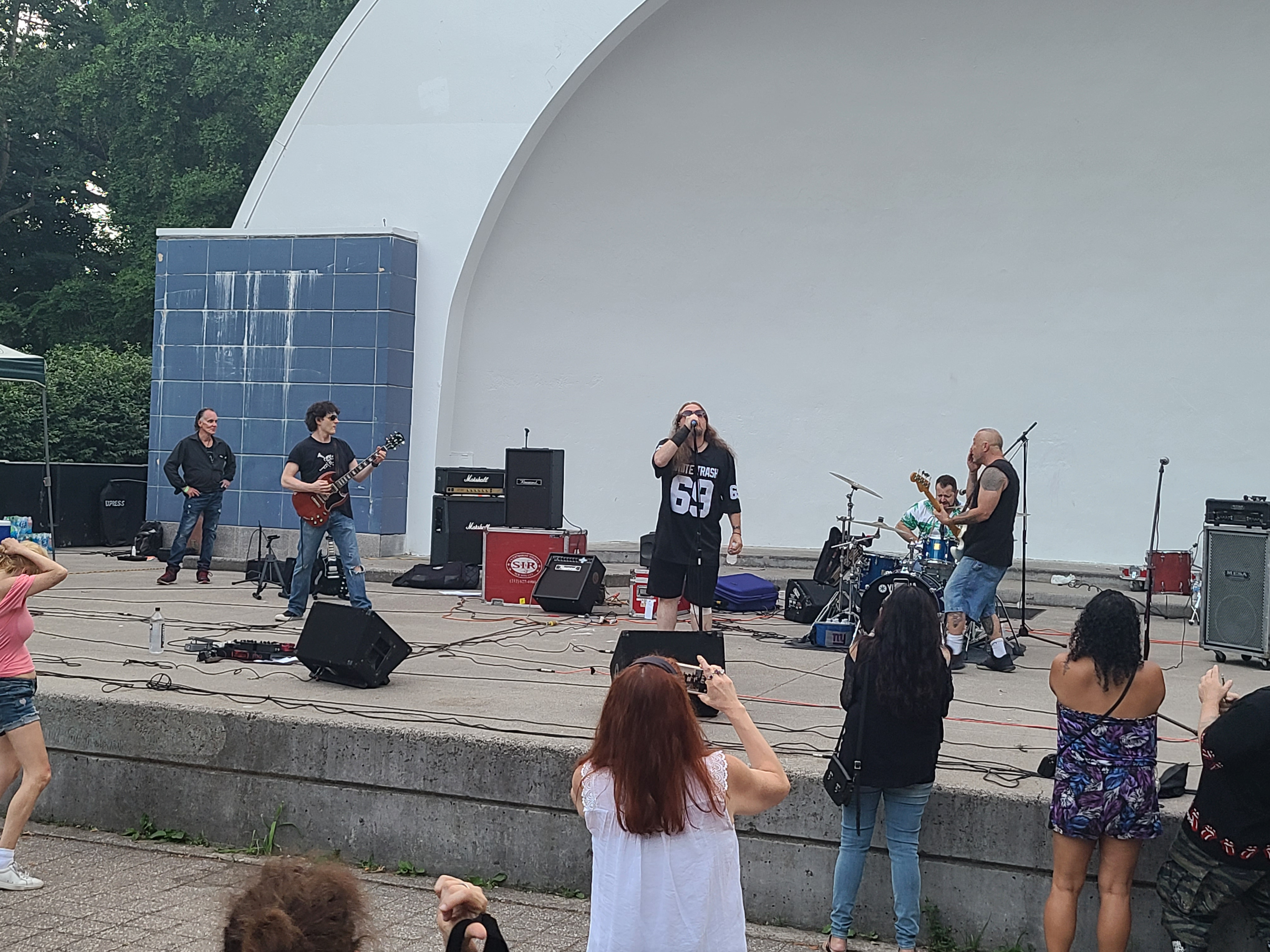
White Trash headlining at Queens Rockfest 2021 in Queens, NY

White Trash disbanded until 2007 when the original line up got back together for a reunion show at the Crazy Donkey in Long Island. The reaction was so positive that the band reformed and played several more shows. In 2008 Dave Alvin and Aaron Collins decided to write new material and get everyone back in the studio to record a brand-new album. In March 2009 White Trash released 3D Monkeys in Space through Gotham Gold Music, and in 2015 White Trash released Suburban Purgatory. The band was touring again until the unexpected death of a heart attack of guitarist Ethan Collins in December 2016.

The band has played numerous benefit concerts since, as well as headlining at Queens Rockfest in June of 2021.

On October 14th, 2024, White Trash released their album C.0.C.K. In A Box, a collection of demos and unreleased tracks in celebration of the 30th anniversary of ¿Sí O Sí, Que?.

As natives of Queens, New York, many of the members of White Trash are die-hard New York Mets fans, and the current band logo is an homage to the team

== Line-ups ==
- Dave "D-Bone" Alvin – vocals, harmonica (1985–1995, 2007–2021)
- Ethan "Sugar Brown" Collins – guitar (1985–1991, 2007–2016; died 2016)
- Aaron "White Owl" Collins – bass, keyboards, piano (1985–1991, 2007–2020)
- Mike Caldarella – drums, percussion (1988–1991, 2007–2017)
- Craig LeBlang – guitar (1991–1995, 2007–2020)
- Eric "The Viking" Brodin – bass (1991–1995)
- Dave Barckow – drums, percussion (1991–1995, 2019-2020)
- Marc Pincus – guitar (2021)
- Anthony Sgaraglio - drums (2021)

=== Horns ===
- Brendan Stiles - trumpet (first two albums)
- Chris Arbisi - alto saxophone (debut album plus "3D Monkeys in Space" & "Suburban Purgatory")
- Terry Thomas - tenor & baritone saxophone (debut album & "3D Monkeys in Space")
- Ed Kollar - trombone (¿Sí O Sí, Que?)
- Benjamin Clapp - trombone ("3D Monkeys in Space" & "Suburban Purgatory")
- Demian Richardson - trumpet ("3D Monkeys in Space" & "Suburban Purgatory")

=== Keyboards ===
- Bernie Worrell - clavinet (¿Sí O Sí, Que?)

== Discography ==
=== Studio albums ===
- White Trash, 1991 (No. 122 US)
- Minor Happiness EP 1993
- ¿Sí O Sí, Que?, 1994
- 3-D Monkeys in Space, 2009
- Suburban Purgatory, 2015
- C.0.C.K. In A Box, 2024

=== Singles ===
Year	Song	Mainstream Rock	Album
1991	"Apple Pie"	39	White Trash
1991	"Po' White Trash"	—	White Trash
1992	"The Crawl"	—	White Trash
1993	"Minor Happiness"	—	¿Sí O Sí, Que?
1993	"Pig"	—	¿Sí O Sí, Que?
