= Attitude Adjustment (band) =

American crossover thrash band

- Also known as: Condemned Attitude, Attitude
- Origin: Walnut Creek, California, U.S.
- Genres: Crossover thrash; thrash metal; hardcore punk
- Years active: 1985–1992; 2007-present
- Labels: Pusmort Records; Eva-Tone; A Matter of Image; In Your Face Records; We Bite Records; Taang records; Beer City Records
- Members: Walter Ryan; Kevin Reed; Eric McIntire aka Eric "Bobo" Smith; Ray Vegas; Greg Orr
- Past members: Andy Andersen; Paul Birnbaum; Tezz Bones; Eric Brecht; Keith Chatham; Nick Koljian; Chris Kontos; Keith Medeiros; Chris Scarparo; Bryon "Yapple" Ruelas; Rick Strahl; Sean Sutton; Ray Vegas

Attitude Adjustment is an American crossover thrash band from the San Francisco Bay Area. Their debut album, American Paranoia, is considered to be an early "crossover" between hardcore punk and thrash metal.

== Formation ==
The band was formed by Chris Kontos, Eric Smith and Rick Strahl in early 1985, with Nick Koljian briefly on vocals. The lineup was changed with the addition of Kevin Reed on vocals. This lineup played a number of initial shows at Ruthie's Inn, the New Method, the Mabuhay Gardens and other Bay Area venues. Several months later, Kevin Reed was replaced by Andy Andersen on vocals and Chris Scaparro joined as a second guitarist. They shortly went into the studio to record the "Dead Serious Demo" in 1985. The demo was recorded by Doug Piercy at the Turk Street Practice Pad.

== Early tours and recording ==
In 1986 and 1987, Attitude Adjustment played frequent gigs throughout California. They played alongside bands such as Forbidden (Known as Forbidden Evil at that time), Vio-lence, Sacrilege, Possessed, Hirax, Death Angel, R.K.L., Dr. Know, Suicidal Tendencies, Corrosion of Conformity, D.R.I., Discharge, UK Subs, Neurosis, The Exploited and Operation Ivy, among others. The band finally released their debut album, American Paranoia, released by Pusmort Records, is considered to be an early "crossover" between hardcore punk and thrash metal.

== Line-up changes ==
- In 1987, Andy Anderson, Chris Scaparro and Rick Strahl joined up with former Condemned to Death Bassist /vocals Keith Chatham, after his return from Australia playing in bands Death Sentence and Vicious Circle. With Vicious Circle guitarist-Les Rumincik/Guitar, Dave Ross/Drums(Vicious Circle/Civil Dissident) and Keith Chatham Bass/Vocals they record "Condemned?-Humanoid or Biomechanoid?"(Reactor Records/Nuclear Blast). When Keith returned to San Francisco Slade Anderson/Drums (Mercenary/Mordred)joined Condemned? This is when the 3 Attitude Adjustment members from the East Bay merged with Condemned? in San Francisco at Turk St studios this became "Condemned Attitude". They recorded first at Peter Miller's two songs with Slade Anderson then Paul Birnbaum/Septic Death joined to finish the "What's Yours?" Demo and record "Kein Schlaf bis Deutschland" (We Bite Records)which would have Rick Strahl on guitar and Keith Chatham back on Bass the band was later renamed just Attitude. Keith and Paul left the band in 1987. Keith formed Something Scaley 1988–98. 2009 Condemned? Record Jungle fever demo with Rick Strahl/Guitar returning and Slade Anderson/Drums, 2011 Condemned? record a double disc on Nuclear Blast-Condemned 2 Death/C2D2, 2015 SteamedPunks EP
- Attitude released an LP and an EP, taking a more thrash metal-like style, with Andy Andersen returning to his initial style of singing. Rick Strahl and Chris Scaparro became the new guitarists with Eric Brecht on drums during this time.
- Chris Kontos, Eric Smith and Kevin Reed continued on with Attitude Adjustment and in 1988, this new lineup released the EP No More Mr. Nice Guy, again on Pusmort Records, which is very different from American Paranoia.
- By 1990, former members Andy Anderson, Chris Scaparro, and Rick Strahl formed a new band with former Piranha guitarist Ron Shipes that had a more hard rock direction. The band was called Two Bit Thief they released an LP "Another Sad Story...In the Big City" They kept it alive until 1995. Subsequently, Ron Shipes forged Fueled.
- Kontos and Reed returned to the name "Attitude Adjustment" in 1991, but with another new lineup to record their last studio album, Out Of Hand, again mixing hardcore with thrash metal.
- In 1993, the American Paranoia LP and the No More Mr. Nice Guy EP were re-issued on CD. The LP version includes the "Dead Serious" demo.
- Chris Kontos joined Robb Flynn (who left Vio-lence) in 1993 to form the post thrash band Machine Head.
- The band reformed in 2007.

== Current lineup ==
- Walter Ryan (drums)
- Kevin Reed (vocals)
- Eric McIntire aka Eric "Bobo" Smith (guitar)
- Ray Vegas (guitar)
- Greg Orr (bass)

== Former members ==
- Andy Andersen (vocals - Condemned Attitude, Attitude, Two Bit Thief)
- Paul Birnbaum (drums)
- Tezz Bones (guitar - Discharge, Broken Bones)
- Eric Brecht (drums - Hirax, Death, D.R.I.)
- Keith Chatham (guitar/bass/vocals- Attitude/Condemned Attitude, Condemned to Death/C2D, Condemned?, Something Scaley)
- Nick Koljian (vocals - Scoopy's Clownhouse Revenge)
- Chris Kontos (drums - Forbidden ,Machine Head, Death Angel, Verbal Abuse)
- Keith Medeiros (bass)
- Chris Scarparo (guitar)
- Bryon "Yapple" Ruelas (guitar)
- Rick Strahl (Bass/Guitar - Condemned Attitude, Attitude, Two Bit Thief)
- Sean Sutton (guitar)
- Ray Vegas (bass - Vio-lence, Social Unrest)

== Bands influenced by Attitude Adjustment ==
- Napalm Death recorded "Dope Fiend" off of "American Paranoia" for Leaders Not Followers: Part 2
- Municipal Waste
- Robb Flynn of Machine Head

== Discography ==
=== Albums ===
- Dead Serious - Demo 1985
- American Paranoia - LP 1986
- The Good, The Bad, The Obnoxious (12", as Attitude) - EP 1987
- No More Mr. Nice Guy - EP 1988
- Out of Hand - LP 1991
- True to the Trade - EP 1996
- The Collection LP 2010
- No Way Back - 2011 - Taang records
- Terrorize - EP 2016 - Beer City Records

=== Compilation albums ===
- Rat Music for Rat People, Vol. 3 (CD Presents, 1987)
