= Alesis Andromeda A6 =

Synthesizer made by Alesis between 2000 and 2010

Andromeda A6
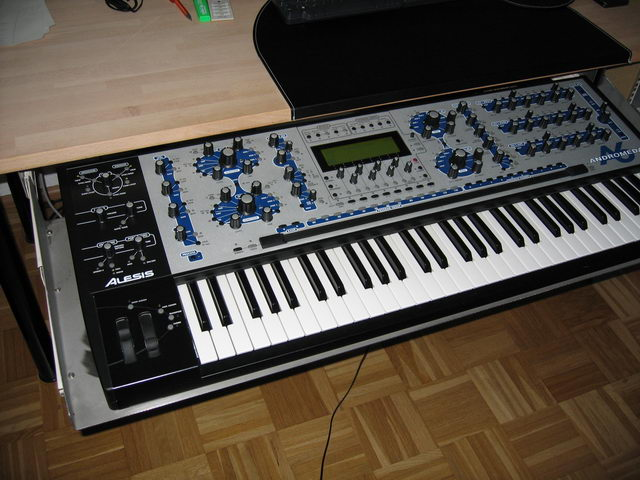
- Alesis Andromeda A6 (side view)
- Manufacturer: Alesis
- Dates: 2000 – 2010
- Price: US$2,499 – 2,999

Technical specifications
- Polyphony: 16
- Timbrality: 16
- Oscillator: 2 VCOs per voice 1 sub-oscillator per VCO
- LFO: 3 dedicated LFOs and S+H
- Synthesis type: Analog Subtractive
- Filter: 2 per voice 2-pole resonant multimode - SEM-style; 4-pole resonant - Moog-style
- Attenuator: 3 x 6-stage envelopes
- Storage memory: 4 x 128 patch internal memory SRAM expansion card slot
- Effects: Analog distortion + digital fx unit

Input/output
- Keyboard: 61-note semiweighted Velocity sensitive Aftertouch
- Left-hand control: Pitch bend and modulation wheels
- External control: MIDI & CV/Gate

The Alesis Andromeda A6 is a 16-voice, 16-channel multitimbral analog synthesizer by Alesis, which was released in 2000 and discontinued in 2010. It combines a pure analog audio signal path with digital control technologies. The VCOs have a pitch correction function, a feature missing on older synthesizers.

The model number A6 is hinting at ASIC – Alesis developed an application-specific integrated circuit for the synth.

The product was designed by Axel Hartmann.

== Specifications ==
- Polyphony: 16 voices
- Oscillators: 2 oscillators (with subs) per voice, 5 waveforms available (sine, triangle, pulse, up saw, down saw); FM and ring modulation
- Filter: 2-pole multimode resonating filter per voice, 4-pole lowpass resonating filter per voice (32 total)
- Effects: Digital reverberation, chorus, echo, analog distortion, quad pitch-shifting, flanger and more
- Arpeggiator: Up, Down, Up/Down
- Sequencer: 16-step, analog style; both have MIDI sync
- Keyboard: 61 keys (velocity and aftertouch sensitive) and a ribbon controller
- Program Memory: 256 preset and 128 user-defined
- Mix Memory: 128 user-defined
- Memory Card Slot: PCMCIA-format
- Control: MIDI (16-parts)
- Date Produced: March 2001 – 2010
- Dimensions (WxHxD): 40.1" x 4.8" x 16.1" (1019 mm x 122 mm x 409 mm)

== Bibliography ==
- "Alesis Andromeda review". Keyboard (May 2001).
- Jenkins, Mark (2009). "The analog revival". Analog Synthesizers: Understanding, Performing, Buying--From the Legacy of Moog to Software Synthesis. CRC Press. pp. 215–216. ISBN 978-1-136-12278-1. "In the USA, Alesis, ... announced the Andromeda, again a 'genuine analog' synth. ... Andromeda looked like being one of the most powerful analog synthes available, at US $3000 quite an expensive proposition, but was taken up by Klaus Schulze and others, and at the time of writing is still reasonably easy to find, if not actually in active production."
