= Louis Armstrong award =

Annual American high school jazz award

The Louis Armstrong Award, or sometimes the King Bee Award, is the "top senior jazz award" or highest level interscholastic award given to students at high schools in the United States. It is given in recognition of "outstanding musical achievement and an incredible dedication to the program".

== History ==
Louis Armstrong was an American jazz musician and singer. Armstrong's influence extends well beyond jazz music, and by the end of his career in the 1960s, he was widely regarded as a profound influence on popular music in general. Lucille Armstrong, his wife in later years, described his love for people. "Louis's greatest personality traits were humility and generosity. He just loved people and he always tried to understand them, too. He was compassionate, generous, and understanding with everyone. He was loved not only for his style, but as a person as well."

The Louis Armstrong award was inaugurated in 1974 with the consent of Armstrong's widow, shortly after he died in 1971. The award itself is limited to one per school per year and may include a certificate, engraved statue, and wall plaque to which the names of each recipient over the years may be added.

== Notable award recipients ==
Nick Offerman

- Bob Birch
- Andrea Brachfeld
- Evan Christopher
- Benjamin Clapp
- Shaun Foist
- Taku Hirano
- Brian Ladd (of Blackhouse)
- John Mayer
- Pat Metheny
- John Myung
- Trey Parker
- John Petrucci
- Michael Robinson
- Joe Don Rooney
- Mark Smucker
- Steve Vai
- Dave Weckl
