= Alesis =

American audio equipment manufacturer

- Type: Subsidiary
- Industry: Electronics
- Founded: 1980; 46 years ago
- Headquarters: Cumberland, Rhode Island, United States
- Key people: Jack O'Donnell (president and CEO)
- Products: Musical instruments, audio/video, electronics, computer-related products, pro audio, music recording equipment
- Parent: inMusic Brands
- Website: www.alesis.com

Alesis is an American company that designs and markets electronic musical instruments, audio processors, mixers, amplifiers, audio interfaces, recording equipment, drum machines, professional audio, and electronic percussion products. Based in Cumberland, Rhode Island, Alesis is an inMusic Brands company.

== History ==
=== Early years ===
Keith Barr, founder of Alesis

Alesis Studio Electronics was founded in Hollywood in 1984 by MXR co-founder Keith Elliott Barr. Leveraging his ability to design custom integrated circuits, Barr's company was able to introduce technologically advanced products at prices within the reach of most project studios. Barr liked the idea of the name Algorithmic Electronic Systems and came up with the name Alesis to try to convey that. Alesis' first product was the XT Reverb. Introduced in 1985, the XT Reverb was an all-digital reverb that carried an unprecedented low price of $799. Barr recruited Russell Palmer as Operations Manager and Robert Wilson (Vice Chairman) to handle international sales so that Barr could continue to focus on engineering.

In 1986, Alesis produced the first 16-bit professional effects processor priced below $1000, the MIDIverb, which had a 12-bit A/D converter and MIDI control. It was joined later in the year by the Microverb, which lacked MIDI but had a 16-bit A/D converter. After enlisting the expertise of Fast Forward Designs, co-founded by veteran Oberheim Electronics designers Marcus Ryle and Michel Doidic (who went on to found Line 6), Alesis introduced the MMT8 hardware sequencer and the very successful HR-16 drum machine in 1987. The HR-16 was employed on the English industrial metal band Godflesh's first few releases; Loudwire called it "the most devastating drum machine ever employed".

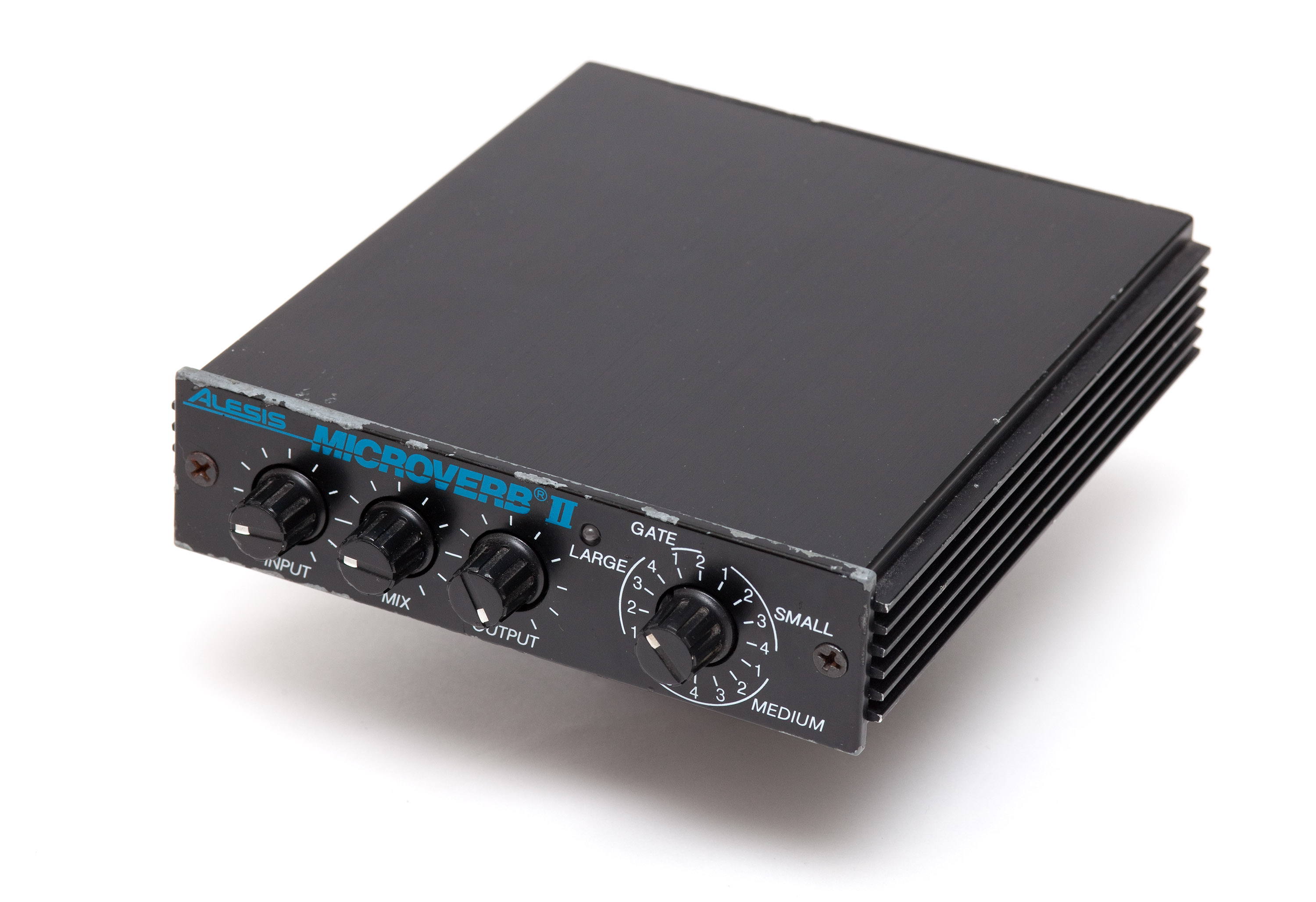
Microverb II (1988)

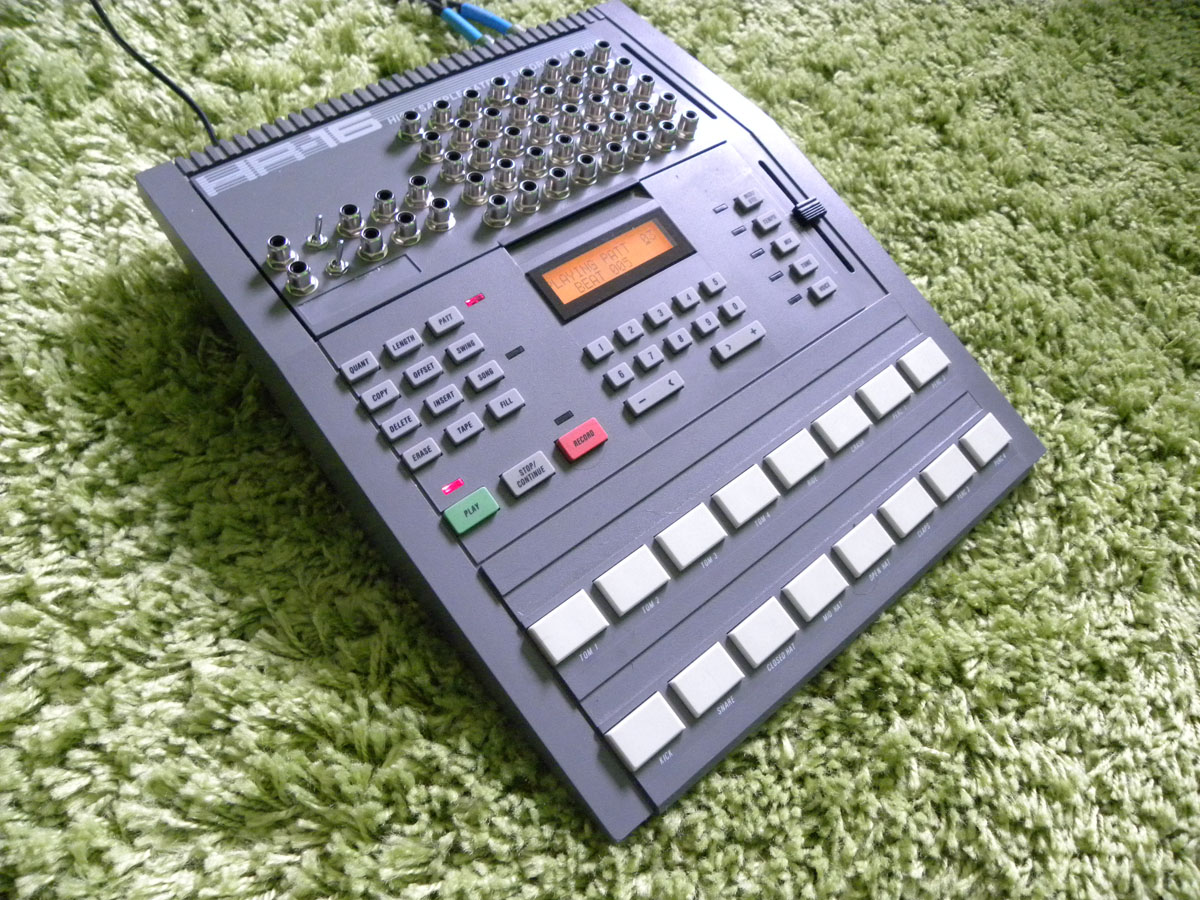
HR-16 (modified)

=== The Alesis ADAT ===
At the 1991 Winter NAMM Show, Alesis introduced the ADAT digital tape recorder. Alesis created the File Streaming Technology (FST) proprietary disk file system for their ADAT HD24 recorder. Each ADAT could record 8 tracks of 16-bit audio on an S-VHS videocassette tape, and up to 16 ADATs could be connected together to record 128 tracks of audio simultaneously. With the same digital resolution as an Audio CD and a price that was a fraction of the other digital recording solutions for home recording at the time, the ADAT was a tremendous success, and its impact on the recording industry has been recognized by induction to the TECnology Hall of Fame.

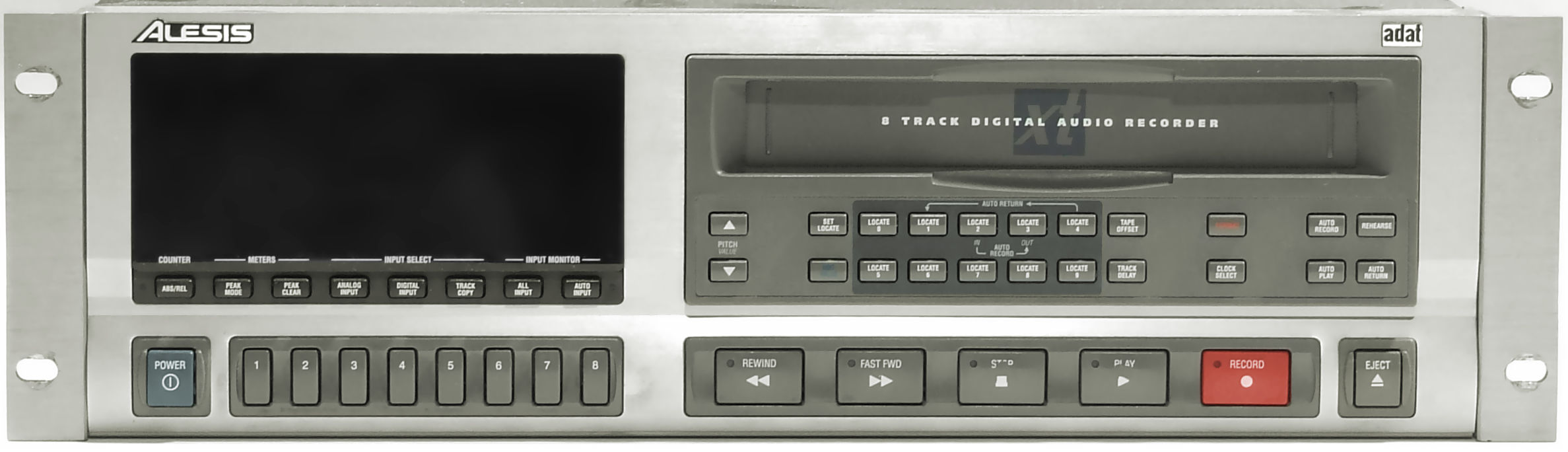
Alesis ADAT XT

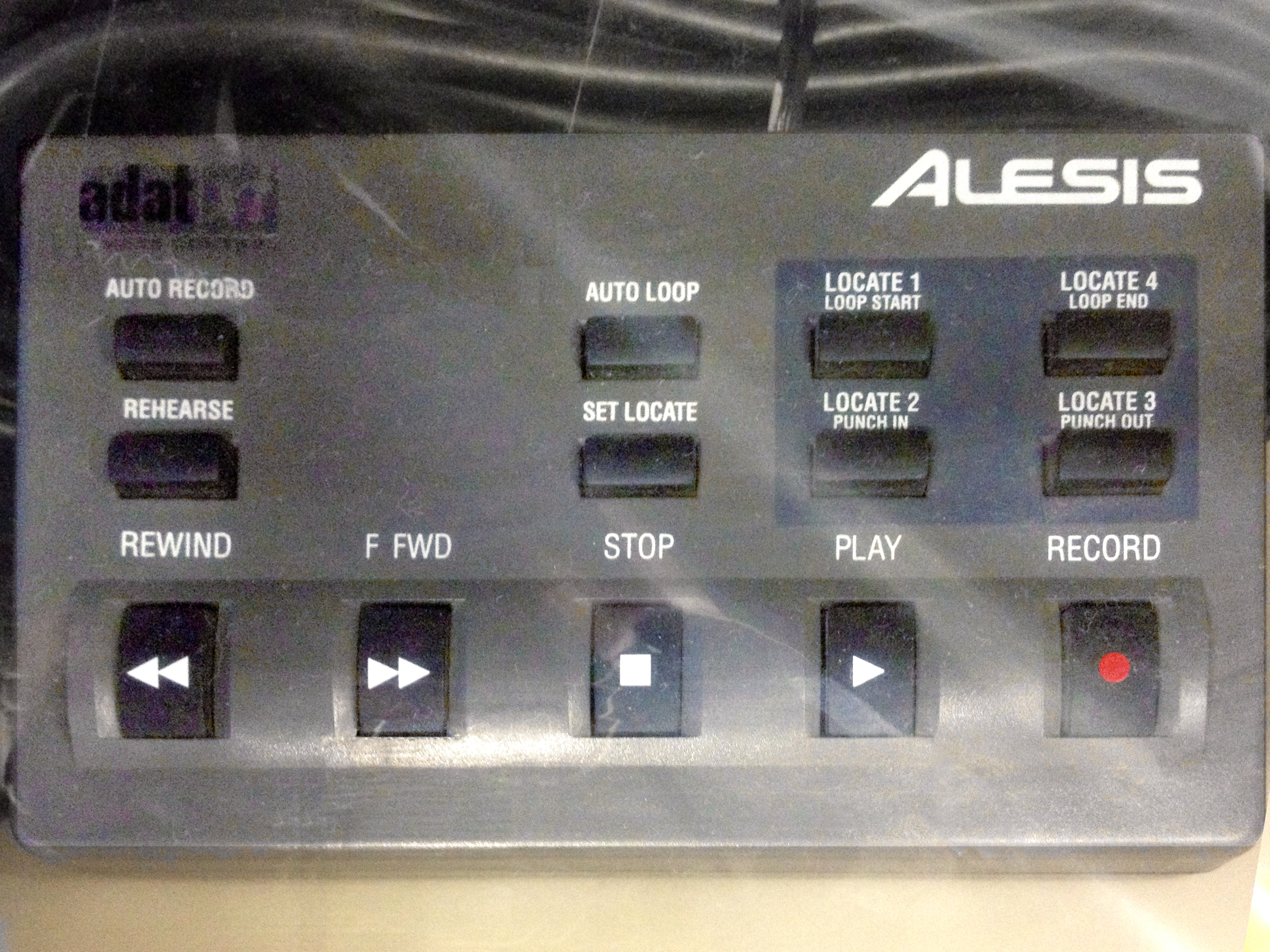
Little Remote Control (LRC) ADAT XT Controller

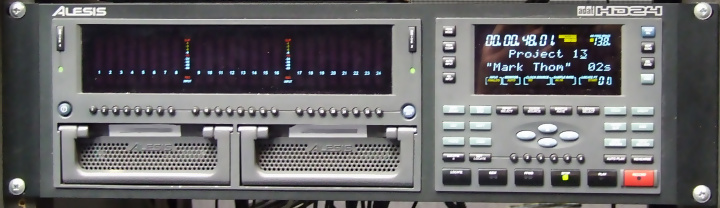
Alesis ADAT HD24

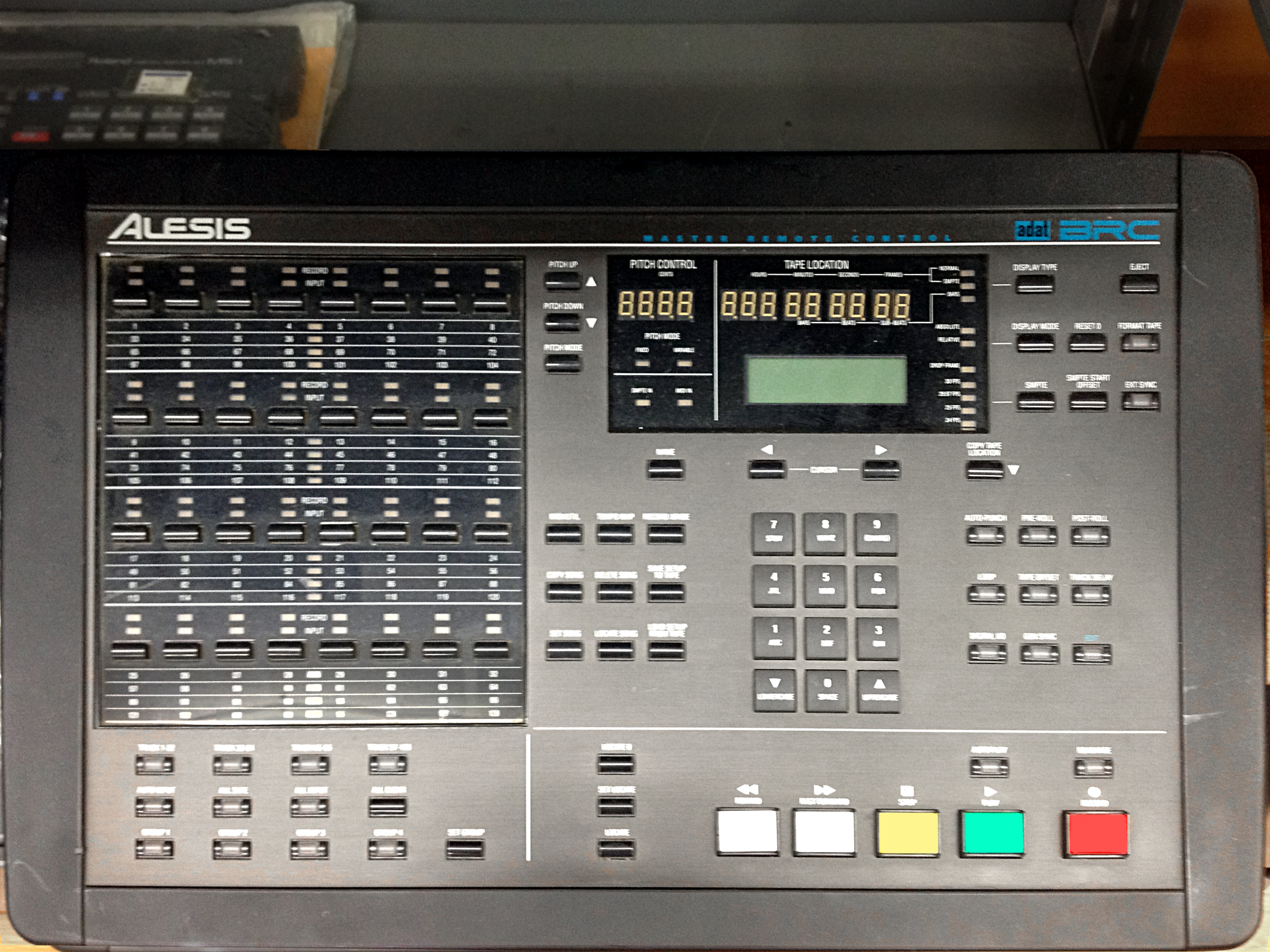
Big Remote Control (BRC) ADAT Master Controller

=== Boom and bankruptcy ===
For the next ten years, Alesis created a wide variety of products such as the QuadraSynth synthesizer, D4 and DM5 drum modules, and Monitor One studio monitors. In 1997, Alesis Semiconductor was formed, again taking advantage of Barr's custom integrated circuits to produce and market chips for the audio industry. A series of chips was introduced that ranged from digital signal processors for audio effects to analog-to-digital and digital-to-analog converters.

By 2001, however, the company's business suffered as market trends changed, and on April 27 of that year, Alesis filed for Chapter 11 bankruptcy. In the subsequent restructuring, Jack O'Donnell acquired the company.

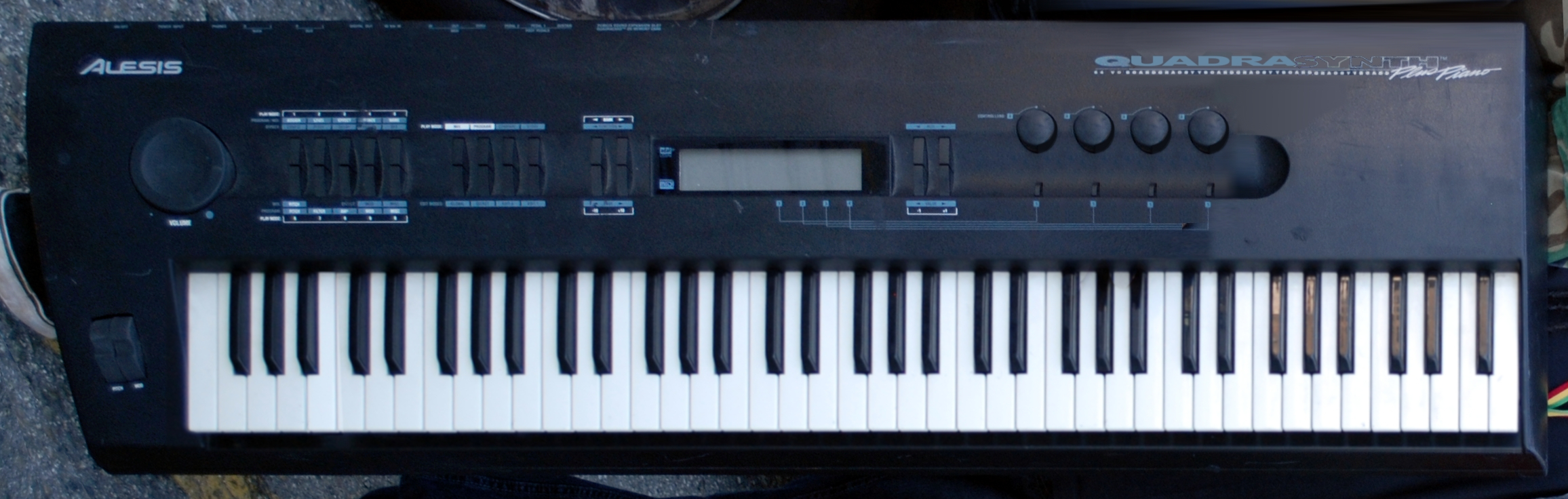
Alesis Quadrasynth

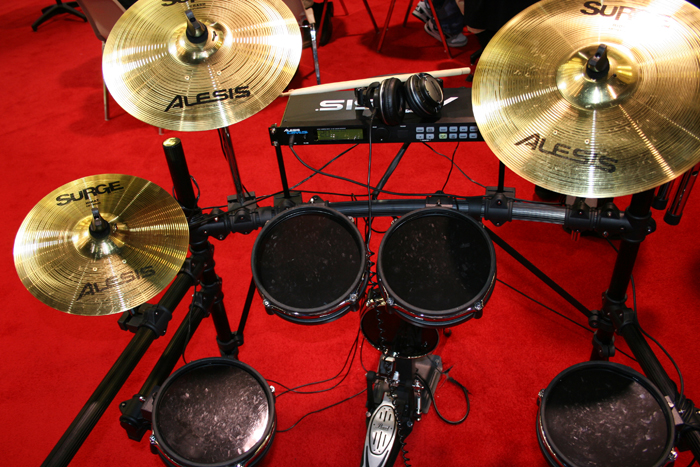
DM5 with Surge Cymbal

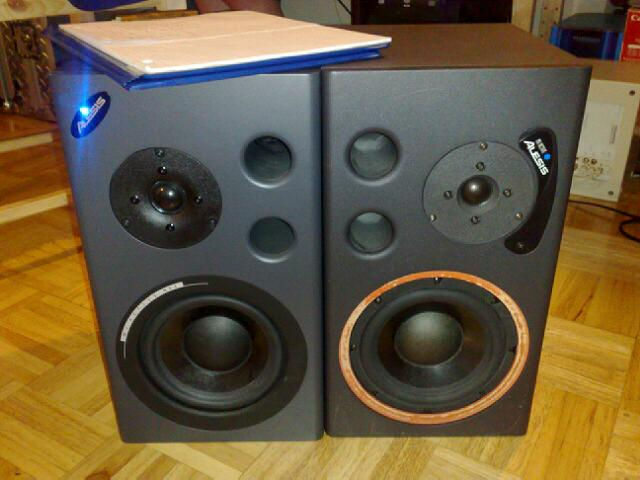
M1 Active

=== After 2001 ===
Under O'Donnell's direction, Alesis expanded into new product categories such as mixers, portable PA speakers, and other recording equipment while continuing to produce Alesis legacy products like the SR-16 drum machine.

Alesis founder Keith Barr died of an apparent heart attack on August 24, 2010, at age 60. In 2012 Alesis became part of the newly created inMusic Brands group of companies.

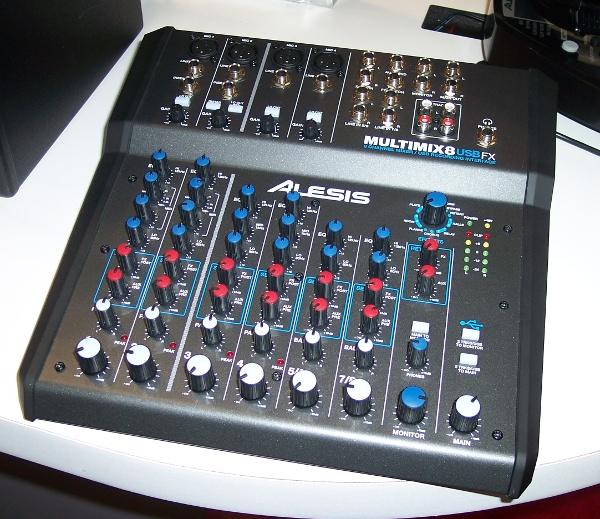
Multimix8

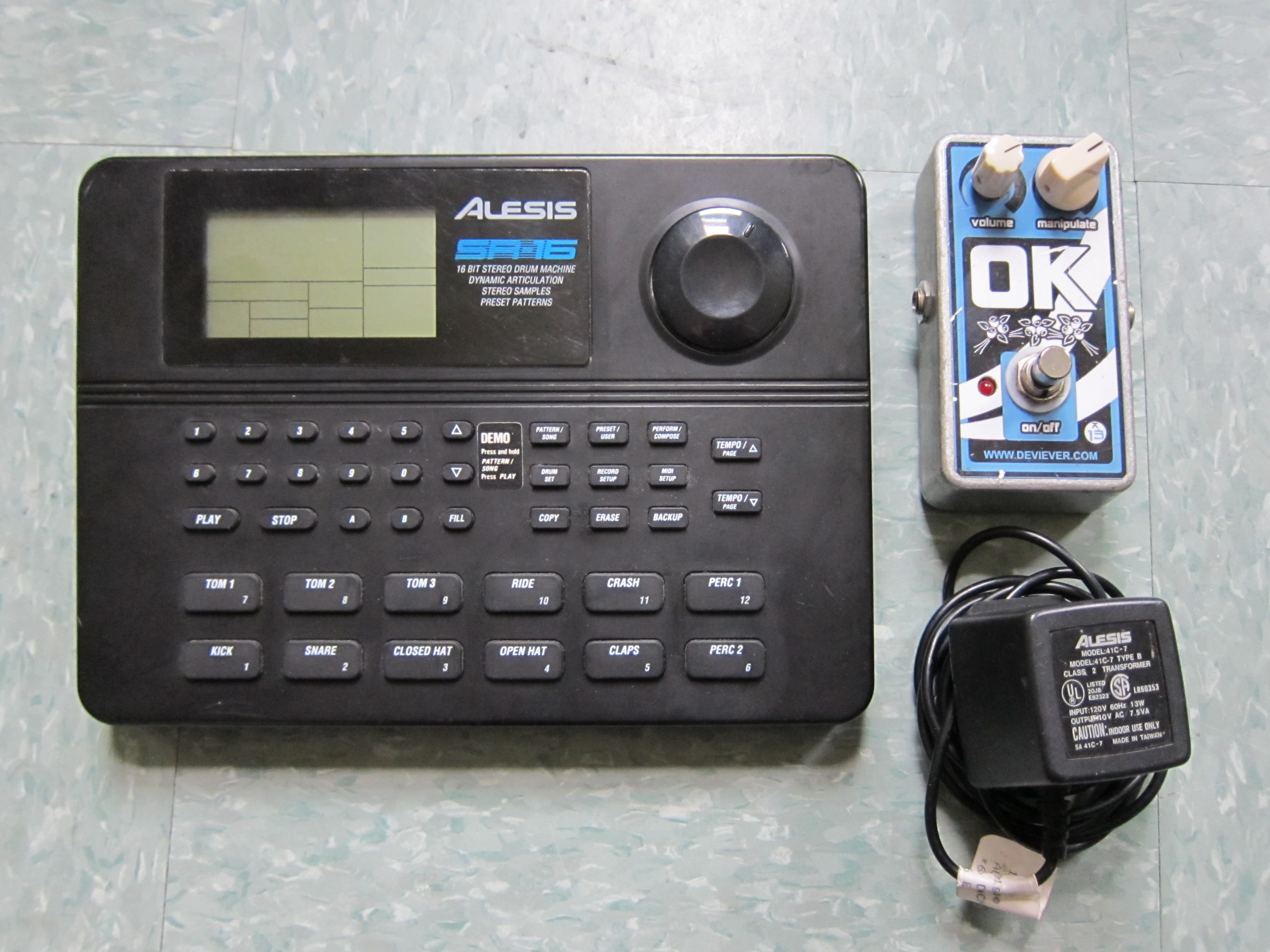
SR-16

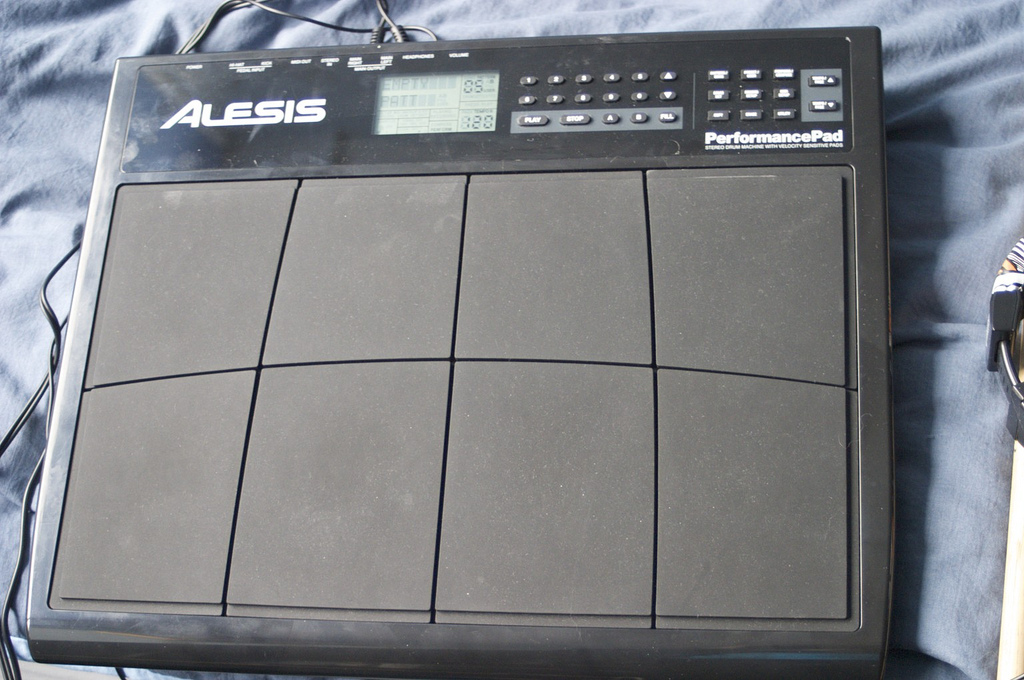
PerformancePad

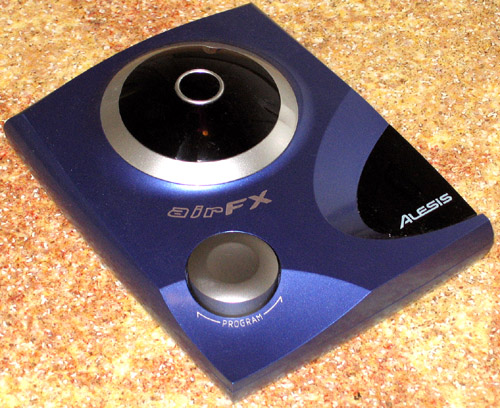
AirFX

== Target market ==
Alesis produces budget equipment as well as high-end gear such as the Alesis Fusion workstation, the Alesis Andromeda A6 analog synthesizer, the Ion virtual analog modeling synthesizer and the Ion-based Micron.

Alesis developed equipment for recording studios during the 1990s.

== Alesis models ==
- Quadrasynth & Quadrasynth Plus synthesizer keyboards
- Andromeda A6 polyphonic analog synthesizer
- Fusion 6HD, 8HD synthesizer workstation keyboard
- ION analog modeling synthesizer
- Recital, 61 & Pro stage pianos
- Virtue stage piano
- Concert stage piano
- Prestige & Prestige Artist stage pianos.
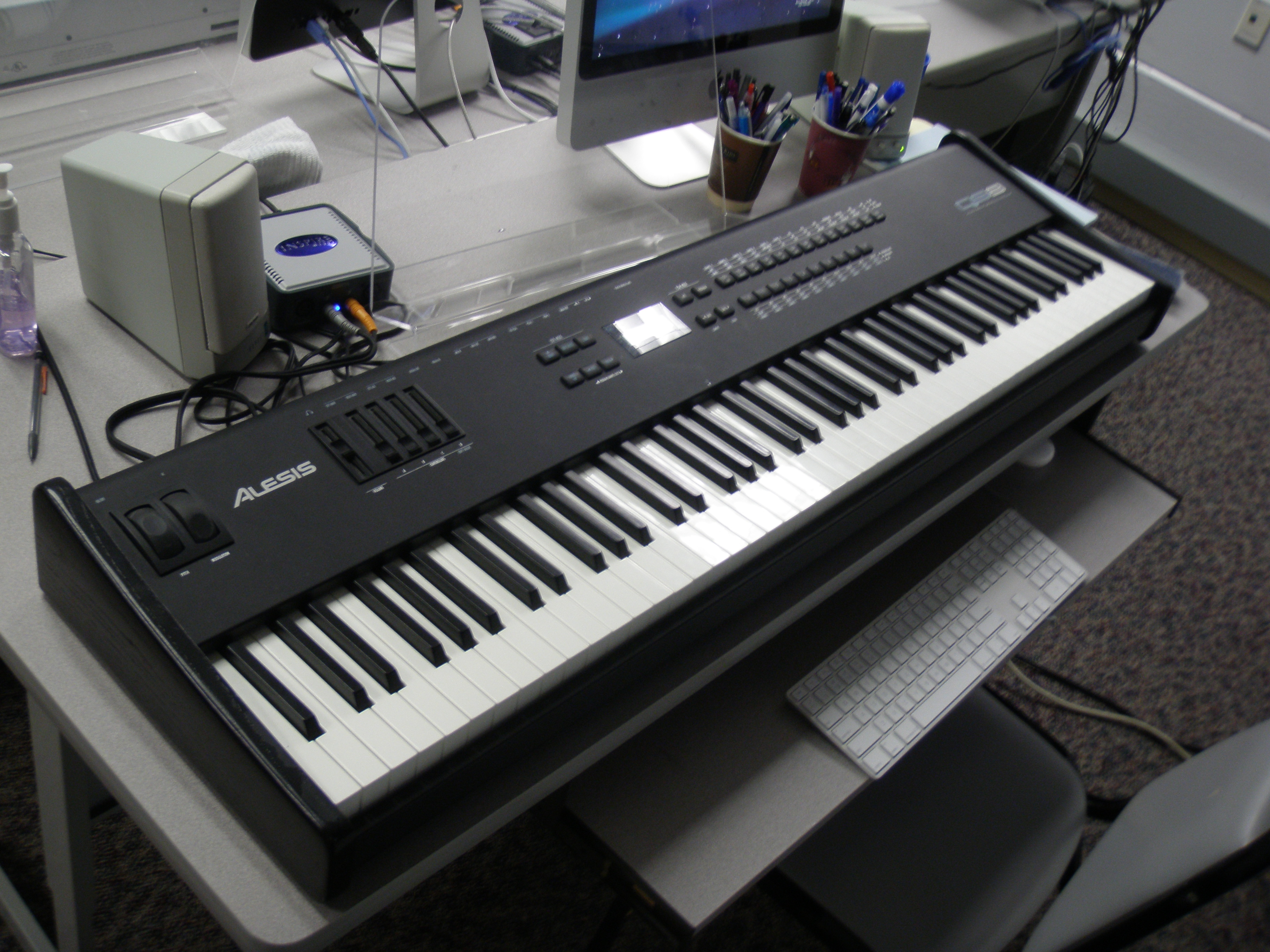
Alesis QS8

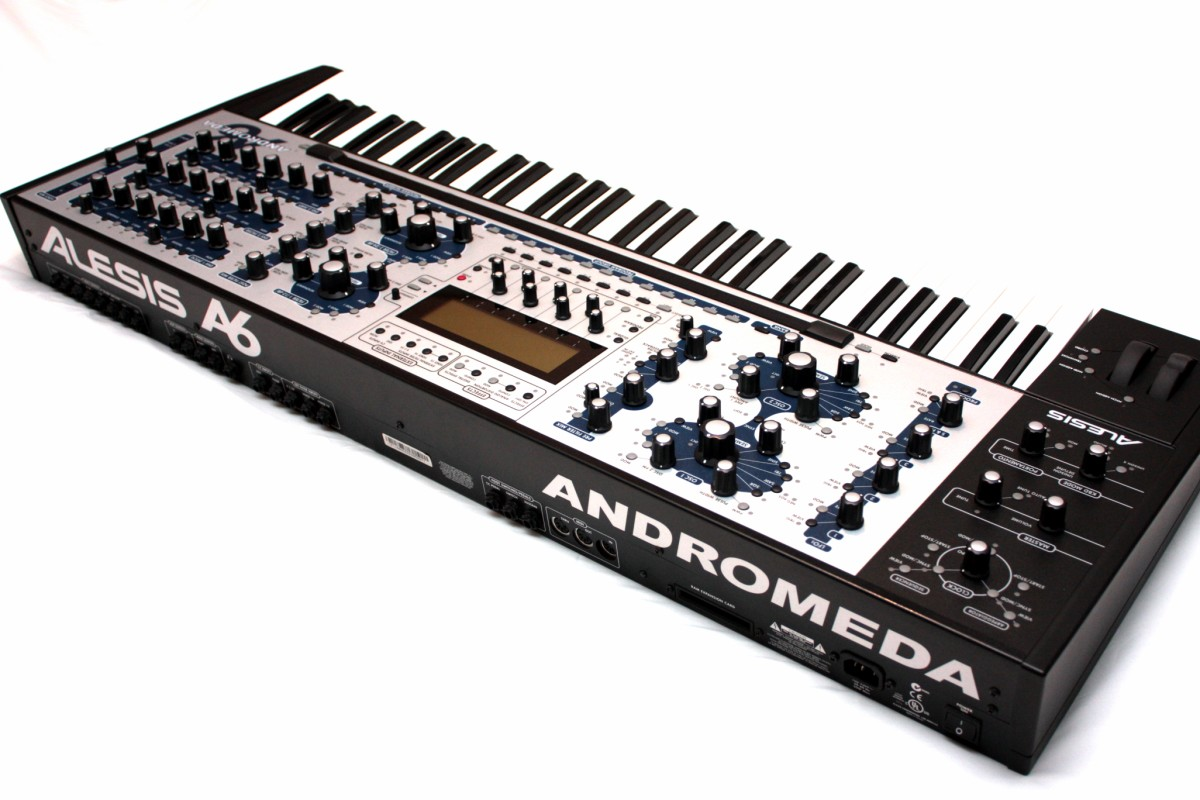
Alesis Andromeda

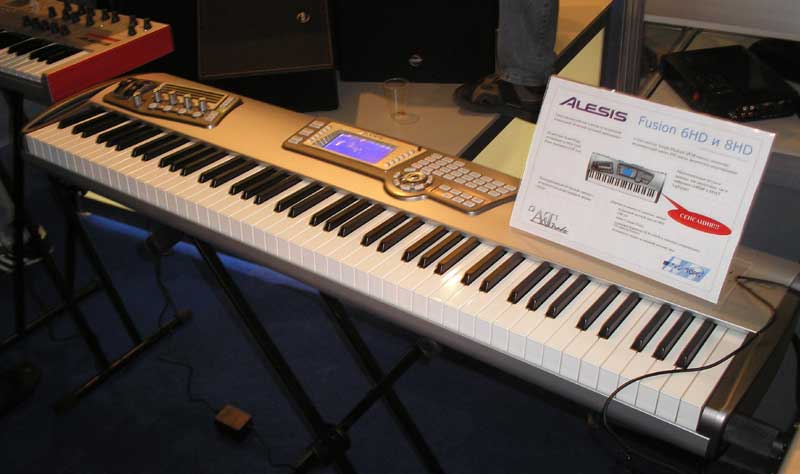
Alesis Fusion

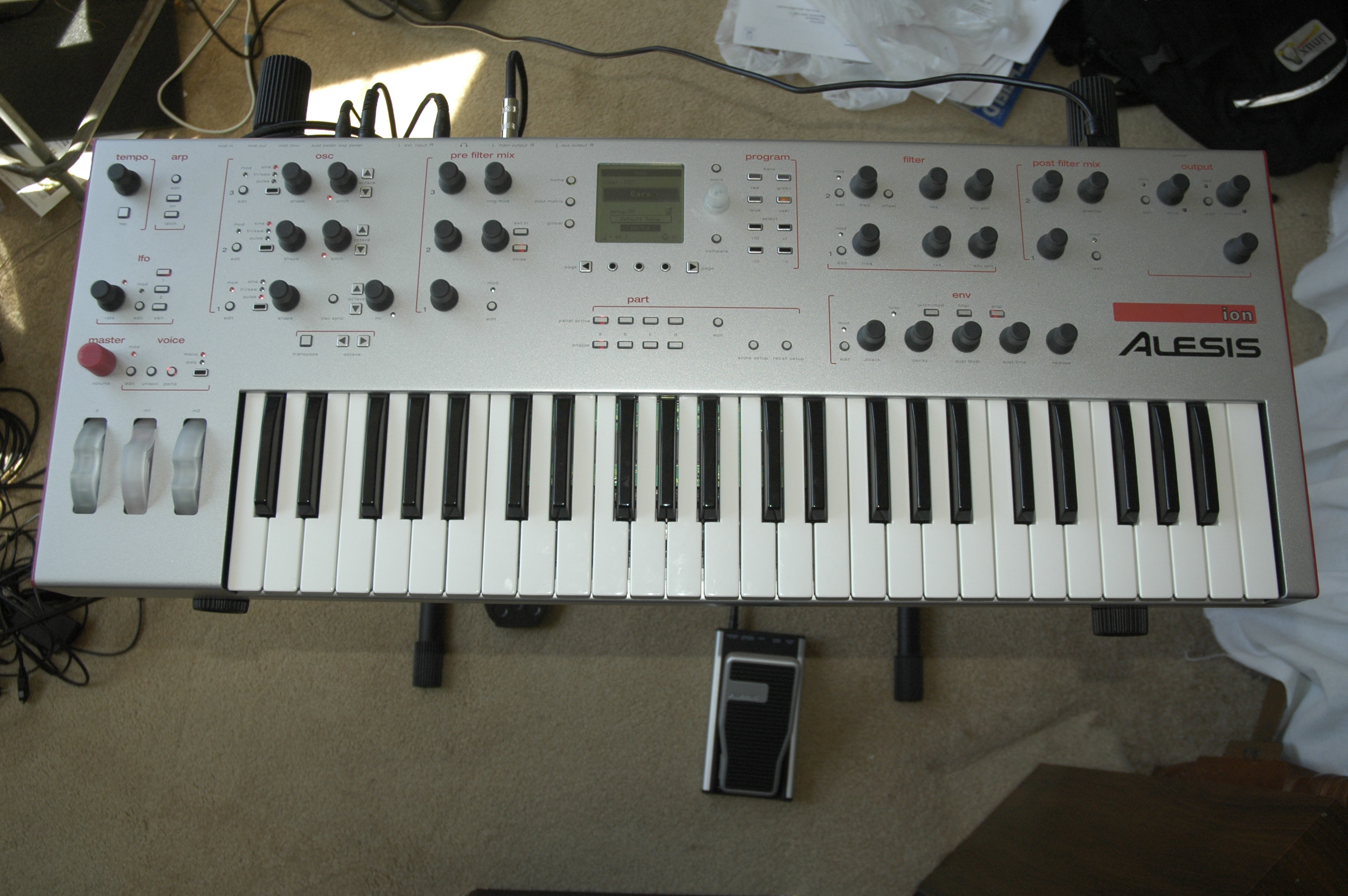
Alesis Ion

== See also ==
- List of studio monitor manufacturers
