= Pushead =

American graphic artist

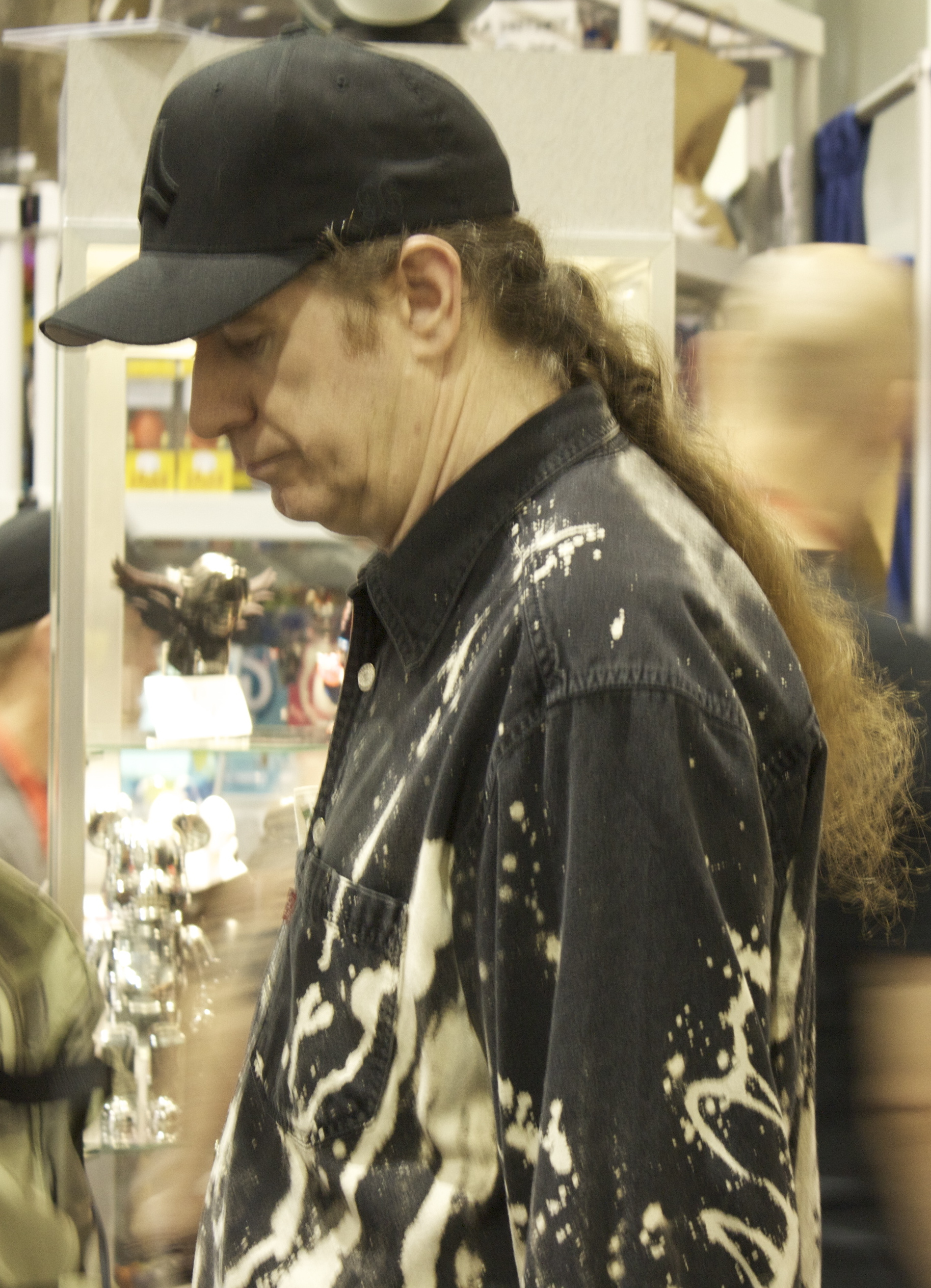
- Pushead at San Diego Comic-Con 2009
- Born: Brian Schroeder
- Occupations: Musician; artist; record label owner; writer
- Years active: 1981–present

Brian Schroeder, better known as Pushead, is an American graphic artist. He is best known for his album covers and other merchandise for bands in the hardcore punk and heavy metal genres.

== Career ==
Originally from Boise, Idaho, Schroeder formed the hardcore band Septic Death in 1981. During this period he developed a career as an artist under the name Pushead, and made that his primary occupation after the band split in 1986.

His artwork, often featuring gruesome depictions of skeletons and corpses, first gained popularity in the skateboarding world due to his artwork being printed as skateboard deck graphics for the company Zorlac starting circa 1981 and continued for nearly a decade. His artwork was also noted by artists in the early hardcore and thrash metal scenes in the 1980s, and later by musicians in several other genres. He has designed album covers, T-shirts, posters, and other merchandise for musicians including Metallica, Misfits, Travis Barker, Kool Keith, and many others. He has also designed for the skateboarding subculture, including regular items associated with Thrasher magazine.

Pushead operated the record labels Pusmort and Bacteria Sour. In recent years his designs have appeared on sneakers, particularly commemorative items released by Metallica, as well as limited edition products from Nike. His work has also appeared on a special edition electric guitar by ESP.
