= Septic Death =

American hardcore punk band

- Origin: Boise, Idaho, United States
- Genres: Hardcore punk; thrashcore
- Years active: 1981–1986
- Labels: Pusmort
- Past members: Brian Schroeder; Jon Taylor; Mike Matlock; Paul Birnbaum

Septic Death was an American hardcore punk band active in the 1980s. The foursome from Boise, Idaho was a major influence for the development of grindcore, thrashcore and "speedcore".

== History ==
Septic Death was formed in 1981 by Brian "Pushead“ Schroeder (vocals), Jon Taylor (guitar), Mike Matlock (bass) and Paul Birnbaum (drums). At the beginning the band was a pure fun project without further ambition. The band name represents a counterdraft to religions promising an afterlife after death. The four members were active in the skating scene of their hometown. Although there was no hierarchy within the band, media interest focused on singer Schroeder who had already made a name as an illustrator within the growing hardcore scene and operated his own record label Pusmort from 1984 on. Most of the band's releases were published via this label.

The band's only regular album, Now That I Have The Attention What Do I Do With It?, was popular in Japan where it was published by major label VAP. The Japanese pressing featured a free double-A-side promotional single with two songs by Corrosion of Conformity and Poison Idea.

The band disbanded in 1986. In 1987 the EP Burial Mai So was released posthumously including material for which James Hetfield had provided backing vocals. On the posthumously released Kichigai EP from 1988 there was material on which Kirk Hammett played guitar.

== Style and influences ==
Septic Death was among the first hardcore bands in the United States. Their music was fast but also very technical. The lyrics of the band's songs mainly deal with fear, paranoia and mental states.

== Impact and legacy ==
Today Septic Death is deemed one of the first and a groundbreaking "speedcore" band and a hardcore legend. Many bands and musicians of different genres name Septic Death as influential for their works, among them Integrity, Darkthrone, John Zorn and Napalm Death. Steven Blush called the band's contributions to 1984 hardcore sampler Cleanse the Bacteria "crucial to metal crossover". Online music magazine Stereogum labeled the band "a cultishly beloved band of hardcore extremists" that was "influential on later generations of bands that combined hardcore and metal". In 2018, British Kerrang! magazine declared Septic Death as the best hardcore band from Idaho and that the band "inspired cornerstone bands such as Infest, Rorschach, and Integrity for years to come".

== Band members ==
The line-up of the band was stable during the entire history of the band.

- Brian Schroeder: Vocals
- Jon "Onj“ Taylor: Guitar
- Mike Matlock: Bass
- Paul Birnbaum: Drums

== Discography ==
- Need So Much Attention... Acceptance Of Whom (EP, 1984, Pusmort)
- Time Is The Boss- Aaarrggh It's Live! (Live EP, 1985, Deluxe)
- Now That I Have The Attention What Do I Do With It? (1986, Pusmort)

=== Post-breakup ===
- Burial Mai So (EP, 1987, Pusmort)
- Kichigai (EP, 1988, Pusmort)
- Somewhere in Time (EP, 1988, Lost and Found Records)
- Attention (Compilation, 1990, Pusmort)
- Theme from Ozobozo (1992, Toy's Factory)
