= Leo Kottke discography =

- Studio albums: 23
- Soundtrack albums: 4
- Live albums: 4
- Compilation albums: 10

This article documents the discography for American guitarist Leo Kottke.

== Albums ==
=== Studio albums ===
Year	Album	US	AUS	Label
1969	6- and 12-String Guitar		-	Takoma
1970	Circle Round the Sun		-	Symposium
1971	Mudlark	168	-	Capitol
1972	Greenhouse	127	-	Capitol
1974	Ice Water	69	94	Capitol
1974	Dreams and All That Stuff	45	-	Capitol
1975	Chewing Pine	114	-	Capitol
1976	Leo Kottke	107	-	Chrysalis
1978	Burnt Lips	143	77	Chrysalis
1978	Balance		-	Chrysalis
1981	Guitar Music		-	Chrysalis
1983	Time Step		-	Chrysalis
1986	A Shout Toward Noon		-	Private Music
1988	Regards from Chuck Pink		-	Private Music
1989	My Father's Face		-	Private Music
1990	That's What		-	Private Music
1991	Great Big Boy		-	Private Music
1994	Peculiaroso		-	Private Music
1997	Standing in My Shoes		-	Private Music
1999	One Guitar, No Vocals		-	Private Music
2004	Try and Stop Me		-	RCA Victor

=== Collaborations ===
Year	Album	Label
2002	Clone (with Mike Gordon)	RCA Victor
2005	Sixty Six Steps (with Mike Gordon)	RCA Victor
2020	Noon (with Mike Gordon)	Megaplum / ATO Records

=== Live albums ===
Year	Album	Label	AUS
1969	12-String Blues	Oblivion Records	-
1973	My Feet Are Smiling	Capitol	93
1980	Live in Europe	Chrysalis	-
1995	Live	On The Spot	-

=== Compilation albums ===
Year	Album	Label
1974	Leo Kottke, Peter Lang & John Fahey	Takoma
1976	1971-1976 (Did You Hear Me?)	Capitol
1976	The Best	Capitol
1983	Voluntary Target	Pair Records
1987	The Best of Leo Kottke	Capitol
1991	Essential	Chrysalis
1997	The Leo Kottke Anthology	Rhino
1997	Hear the Wind Howl (released in Europe only)	DISKY
2003	The Instrumentals: The Best of the Capitol Years	Blue Note
2003	The Instrumentals: The Best of the Chrysalis Years	Blue Note

=== Soundtracks ===
Year	Album	Label
1979	Days of Heaven	Pacific Arts
1985	Little Treasure	
1986	Fat Guy Goes Nutzoid	
1994	Paul Bunyan (with Jonathan Winters)	Rabbit Ears
