= Leo Kottke: 1971–1976 =

Compilation album by Leo Kottke
- Released: 1976
- Recorded: 1971–1976
- Genre: Folk, country, new acoustic, American primitive guitar
- Length: 41:19
- Label: Capitol (ST-11576)
- Producer: Denny Bruce

Leo Kottke chronology
Chewing Pine (1975)	Leo Kottke: 1971–1976 (1976)	Leo Kottke (1976)

Leo Kottke: 1971–1976 is a compilation album of songs released on Capitol during Kottke's tenure with that label. It is sometimes referred to as Did You Hear Me? due to the handwritten caption on the photo on the cover. It peaked at #153 on the Billboard Pop Albums charts.

== History ==
After the release of Chewing Pine, Kottke subsequently signed with Chrysalis Records. Six of the songs here were edited or re-mixed for this release. The track "Morning is the Long Way Home" is an edited down version of the original release from Ice Water, minus the vocals. Kottke would re-record this version again in 1999 on One Guitar, No Vocals.

The song "Pamela Brown" was also featured as the sole Leo Kottke track in a promotional-only compilation album from 1976 issued by Capitol Records entitled The Greatest Music Ever Sold (Capitol SPRO-8511/8512), which was distributed to record stores during the 1976 Holiday season as part of Capitol's "Greatest Music Ever Sold" campaign. The campaign promoted 15 different Best Of... albums released by the label. Each of the actual albums represented was adorned with a gold-foiled round sticker which read "The Greatest Music Ever Sold", adhered to the front of the shrinkwrap.

Professional ratings
Review scores
Source	Rating
AllMusic	3/5 stars

== Track listing ==
All tracks composed by Leo Kottke, except where indicated

=== Side one ===
1. "Morning is the Long Way Home" Instrumental Break – 3:40
2. "June Bug" – 2:12
3. "When Shrimps Learn to Whistle" – 3:30
4. "Room 8" – 2:58
5. "Cripple Creek" (Traditional, arranged by Leo Kottke) – 1:55
6. "Pamela Brown" (Tom T. Hall) – 4:03
7. "Standing on the Outside" (Leo Kottke, Mary Kottke) – 2:31

=== Side two ===
1. "Grim to the Brim" – 3:10
2. "Power Failure" (Gary Brooker, Keith Reid) – 2:22
3. "You Tell Me Why" (Ron Elliott) – 3:56
4. "Why Ask Why?" (Norman Gimbel, Ken Lauber) – 2:09
5. "Open Country Joy (Constant Traveler)" (John McLaughlin) – 3:39
6. "All Through the Night" (Traditional, arranged by Leo Kottke) – 1:38
7. "The Scarlatti Rip-Off" – 3:26

== Personnel ==
- Leo Kottke - 6 & 12-string guitar
- Bill Peterson - bass
- Bill Berg - drums
- Bill Barber - piano, synthesizer
- Larry Taylor - bass
- Paul Lagos - drums
- Herb Pilhofer - piano

Production notes:

- Produced by Denny Bruce
- Art Direction: John Van Hamersveld
- Photography: John Seidermann, Denny Bruce
