= Dreams and All That Stuff =

Dreams and all that stuff
- Cover photo airbrushed over a photo of Monument Valley, Utah

Studio album by Leo Kottke
- Released: 1974
- Recorded: Sound 80, Minneapolis, MN
- Genre: Folk, new acoustic, American primitive guitar
- Length: 30:03
- Label: Capitol (ST-11335)
- Producer: Denny Bruce

Leo Kottke chronology
| Ice Water (1974) | Dreams and all that stuff (1974) | Leo Kottke, Peter Lang & John Fahey (1974) |

Dreams and all that stuff is the eighth album by guitarist Leo Kottke. It is the only completely instrumental album Kottke released on Capitol. It peaked at #45 on the Billboard Pop Albums charts, his highest position achieved on the Pop Albums charts.

It was re-issued on CD by BGO Records (CD132) in 1992 and One Way Records (S21-18462) in 1996.

== Reception ==
Professional ratings
Review scores
| Source | Rating |
|---|---|
| AllMusic | 3/5 stars |

Writing for AllMusic, music critic Bruce Eder wrote of the album "The shifting moods make this album, appropriately enough, a rather dreamlike experience... Kottke's own tunes are reasonably memorable, though the virtuosity tends to overshadow the music itself at times."

== Track listing ==
All songs by Leo Kottke except as noted.

=== Side one ===
1. "Mona Ray" (Leo Kottke, Michael Johnson) – 3:40
2. "When Shrimps Learn to Whistle" – 3:28
3. "Twilight Property" – 3:11
4. "Bill Cheatham" (P.D.; arranged by Kottke and Hand) – 1:45
5. "Vertical Trees" – 2:34

=== Side two ===
1. Medley: "San Antonio Rose" / "America the Beautiful" (Bob Wills, Ward-Bates, P.D.; Bourne Co.; arranged by Kottke) – 2:03
2. "Constant Traveler" – 3:50
3. "Why Ask Why?" (Norman Gimbel, Ken Lauber) – 2:09
4. "Taking a Sandwich to a Feast" – 2:45
5. "Hole in the Day" – 2:50
6. "Mona Roy" – 1:48

== Personnel ==
- Leo Kottke – 6 & 12-String Guitar
- Mike Johnson – duet guitar on "Mona Ray"
- Bill Berg – percussion
- Bill Peterson – bass
- Bill Barber – synthesizer, piano
- Cal Hand – steel guitar, dobro
- Herb Pilhofer – piano on "Why Ask Why?"
- Jack “Birthday Party” Smith – piano on "Mona Roy"

== Production notes ==
- Denny Bruce – producer
- Paul “Shorty” Martinson – engineer
- Bob Berglund – mastering
- John Van Hamersveld – album design, photography
