= Chewing Pine =

Studio album by Leo Kottke
- Released: 1975
- Studio: Sound 80 (Minneapolis, Minnesota)
- Genre: Folk, new acoustic, American primitive guitar
- Length: 33:26
- Label: Capitol (ST-11446)
- Producer: Denny Bruce

Leo Kottke chronology
Leo Kottke, Peter Lang & John Fahey (1974)	Chewing Pine (1975)	1971-1976 (Did You Hear Me?) (1976)

Chewing Pine is the last album on the Capitol label by American guitarist Leo Kottke, released in 1975. It peaked at #114 on the Billboard Pop Albums charts. "Power Failure" was originally recorded by Procol Harum, a band Kottke toured with in Europe in the 1970s.

It was re-issued on CD by BGO (CD148) in 1992 and One Way Records (18461) in 1996.

== Reception ==
Professional ratings
Review scores
Source	Rating
AllMusic	2.5/5 stars

Writing for Allmusic, music critic Bruce Eder wrote of the album, "a dazzling amalgam of sounds and styles — there's a surprising emphasis on vocal numbers here... The obvious attempt on Chewing Pine to sell Kottke as more of a mainstream artist and a sometime singer obviously didn't work... There are enough good moments, and even a few transcendent ones, to justify owning this album."

== Track listing ==
All songs by Leo Kottke unless noted.

=== Side One ===
1. "Standing on the Outside" (Leo Kottke, Mary Kottke) – 2:35
2. "Power Failure" (Gary Brooker, Keith Reid) – 2:24
3. "Venezuela, There You Go" – 3:08
4. "Don't You Think" (Marty Robbins) – 3:34
5. "Regards From Chuck Pink" – 2:56

=== Side Two ===
1. "Monkey Money" – 1:45
2. "The Scarlatti Rip-Off" – 3:33
3. "Wheels" (Norman Petty) – 1:47
4. "Grim to the Brim" – 3:13
5. "Rebecca" (Richard Crandell) – 2:48
6. "Trombone" – 2:12
7. "Can't Quite Put it Into Words" – 3:21

== Personnel ==
- Leo Kottke – 6 & 12-string guitar, vocals
- Bill Berg – drums, percussion
- Bill Peterson – bass
- Bill Barber – piano
- Jack Smith – organ on "Don’t You Think"

== Production notes ==
- Produced by Denny Bruce
- Engineer: Paul Martinson
- Mastering Engineer: Bob Berglund
- Technical Assistance: Tom Mudge and David Pelletier
- Art Direction: Roy Kohara
- Photography: Tom Berthiaume
