= One Guitar, No Vocals =

One Guitar No Vocals

Studio album by Leo Kottke
- Released: June 29, 1999
- Recorded: Hudson-Forrester Studios, Edina, MN
- Genres: Folk, new acoustic, American primitive guitar
- Length: 50:42
- Label: Private Music (01005-82171-2)
- Producer: Leo Kottke

Leo Kottke chronology
Standing in My Shoes (1997)	One Guitar No Vocals (1999)	Clone (2002)

One Guitar No Vocals is an instrumental album by American guitarist Leo Kottke, released in 1999.

== History ==
"Morning is the Long Way Home" is a re-recorded version of the instrumental break that first appeared on Ice Water. The shortened version first appeared on 1971-1976. The song "Three Quarter North", which first appeared on the album A Shout Toward Noon, is here played slightly faster without any accompaniment. Originally recorded for the 1985 Tri-Star motion picture Little Treasure comes the piece "From 'Little Treasure'". A different version of "Accordion Bells" appears on Carols of Christmas II (1997) on BMG/Windham Hill where it was first recorded. The song "Bigger Situation" is a re-working and combining of "Big Situation", "I Yell at Traffic", and "Room Service (at the Tahiti Motel)". The song "Chamber of Commerce" was originally introduced at live performances as "Goddammit" and as written in response to the accidental death of Michael Hedges.

== Reception ==
Professional ratings
Review scores
Source	Rating
AllMusic	3/5 stars
The Weekly Wire	(no rating)
Encyclopedia of Popular Music	3/5 stars

AllMusic music critic Stephen Erlewine wrote of the album "Kottke is at his most impressive at his most intimate, turning out alternately gentle and intense solo guitar pieces. No matter how complex the music is — and it is, at minimum, moderately complex — Kottke pulls it off with grace, making it all seem easy... while this album isn't as exciting or revelatory as his earliest records, it's still a joy to hear a master at the top of his form." In her review for The Weekly Wire, critic Mari Wadsworth wrote: "Fans of the guitarist's acoustic songwriting have nothing to fear on One Guitar, No Vocals, which shows off Kottke's playing at its best to date."

== Track listing ==
All songs were written by Leo Kottke.

1. "Snorkel" – 3:24
2. "Morning is the Long Way Home" – 4:25
3. "Too Fast" – 5:10
4. "Three Quarter North" – 3:19
5. "Retrograde" – 3:07
6. "Chamber of Commerce" – 3:38
7. "From 'Little Treasure'" – 1:27
8. "Bigger Situation" – 9:26
9. "Accordion Bells" – 5:59
10. "Peckerwood" – 2:21
11. "Blimp" – 3:26
12. "Even His Feet Look Sad" – 4:00

== Personnel ==
- Leo Kottke - 6 & 12-string guitar

== Production notes ==
- Engineered by Sam Hudson
- Mastered by Doug Sax
