= Instrumentals: The Best of the Capitol Years =

Compilation album by Leo Kottke
- Released: Feb 11, 2003
- Recorded: 1970–1975
- Genre: Folk, new acoustic, American primitive guitar
- Label: Blue Note (42312)
- Producer: Denny Bruce

Leo Kottke chronology
Clone (2002)	Instrumentals: The Best of the Capitol Years (2003)	Instrumentals: The Best of the Chrysalis Years (2003)

Instrumentals: The Best of the Capitol Years is a 2003 compilation of American guitarist Leo Kottke's releases on the Capitol label. It was released at the same time as Instrumentals: The Best of the Chrysalis Years.

== Reception ==
Professional ratings
Review scores
Source	Rating
AllMusic	4/5 stars
Encyclopedia of Popular Music	4/5 stars

Writing for AllMusic, music critic Hal Horowitz wrote of the album "...having a compilation of Kottke's instrumental music — much of it totally solo — makes for a cohesive — some might say definitive — portrait of the guitarist's jaw-dropping skills... Although his approach would ultimately lead others to new age, there is nothing here that is atmospheric or merely background music. Beautiful, difficult, quirky, but never flashy for the sake of show, Kottke's singular style remains vital and influential to everyone who picks up an acoustic guitar... this is as good a place as any to start a Kottke collection."

== Track listing ==
- All songs by Leo Kottke except as noted.
- All tracks are excerpted from Mudlark, Greenhouse, My Feet Are Smiling, Ice Water, Dreams and All That Stuff and Chewing Pine.
- "Ice Miner" is the version from Mudlark, not the Takoma compilation release.
- There are no bonus tracks or unreleased material here, unlike Instrumentals: The Best of the Chrysalis Years.
1. "June Bug" – 2:14
2. "Ice Miner" – 2:02
3. "Poor Boy" (John Fahey, Bukka White)– 2:06
4. "Machine #2" – 3:01
5. "Bean Time" – 2:32
6. "In Christ There is No East or West" (Traditional) – 2:12
7. "Owls" – 5:02
8. "Lost John" – 2:18
9. "Blue Dot" – 2:54
10. "Eggtooth" (Kottke, Michael Johnson) – 5:16
11. "Medley: Crow River Waltz/Jesu, Joy of Man’s Desiring/Jack Fig" (Leo Kottke, J. S. Bach) – 7:16
12. "Mona Ray" – 3:43
13. "Twilight Property" – 3:15
14. "Taking a Sandwich to a Feast" – 2:49
15. "A Good Egg" – 3:12
16. "A Child Should Be a Fish" – 3:49
17. "The Scarlatti Rip-off" – 3:33
18. "Grim to the Brim" – 3:10

== Personnel ==
- Leo Kottke – 6 & 12-string guitar, vocals
- Bill Berg – drums
- Kenny Buttrey – drums
- Wayne Moss – bass
- Cal Hand – dobro, pedal steel guitar
- Michael Johnson – guitar
- Paul Lagos – drums
- Bill Peterson – bass
- Larry Taylor – bass
- Steve Gammel – guitar
