= Ice Water (album) =

Studio album by Leo Kottke
- Released: 1974
- Recorded: Sound 80, Minneapolis, MN
- Genre: Folk, new acoustic, American primitive guitar
- Length: 38:11
- Label: Capitol (ST-11262)
- Producer: Denny Bruce

Leo Kottke chronology
| My Feet Are Smiling (1973) | Ice Water (1974) | Dreams and All That Stuff (1974) |

Ice Water is the seventh album by guitarist Leo Kottke. It contains Kottke's only charting single, the Tom T. Hall composition "Pamela Brown". Ice Water peaked at #69 on the Billboard Pop Albums charts.

It was re-issued on CD by BGO (CD146) in 1992 and One Way Records in 1996.

Kottke has stated that he recorded the vocals for the entire album while lying on his back after being told by an Air Force sergeant that this position helps open the diaphragm and could improve one's singing voice (Kottke amusingly admits that "it didn't work").

== Reception ==
Professional ratings
Review scores
| Source | Rating |
|---|---|
| AllMusic | 3/5 stars |
| Encyclopedia of Popular Music | 4/5 stars |

Writing for AllMusic, music critic Bruce Eder noted that the album was more directed to country-flavored vocals and wrote of the album, "This is a good record, though not the Leo Kottke album to start with, as it is not representative of his usual work... Among the instrumentals, "A Good Egg" is just the kind of light-fingered, light-textured virtuoso piece that one buys a Leo Kottke album expecting to find, and much of the rest shows off his talents in some unexpected directions."

== Track listing ==
All songs by Leo Kottke except as noted.

=== Side one ===
1. "Morning is the Long Way Home" – 6:26
2. "Pamela Brown" (Tom T. Hall) – 4:03
3. "A Good Egg" – 3:10
4. "Tilt Billings and the Student Prince" (Leo Kottke, Ron Nagle) – 4:56
5. "All Through the Night" (Traditional; arranged by Kottke) – 1:30

=== Side two ===
1. "Short Stories" (Leo Kottke, Cal Hand) – 3:01
2. "You Tell Me Why" (Ron Elliott) – 3:58
3. "You Know I Know You Know" – 4:08
4. "Born to Be With You" (Don Robertson) – 3:02
5. "A Child Should Be a Fish" – 3:45

== Charts ==
| Chart (1974) | Peak position |
|---|---|
| Australia (Kent Music Report) | 94 |

== Personnel ==
- Leo Kottke — 6- & 12-string guitar, vocals
- Bill Berg — drums, percussion
- Bill Peterson — bass
- Bill Barber - piano, synthesizer
- Cal Hand — dobro, steel guitar

== Production notes ==
- Album Design & Illustration Concept—John Van Hamersveld
- Produced By Denny Bruce (Takoma Productions, Inc.)
- Recorded, Mixed & Mastered—Sound 80, Minneapolis, Minnesota
- Engineer—Paul “Don't Call Me Slater Martin” Martinson
