= The Best (Leo Kottke album) =

Greatest hits album by Leo Kottke
- Released: 1976
- Genres: Folk, new acoustic, American primitive guitar
- Label: Capitol (11867)
- Producer: Denny Bruce

Leo Kottke chronology
Leo Kottke (1976)	The Best (1976)	Burnt Lips (1978)

The Best is a compilation double album of American guitarist Leo Kottke's releases on the Capitol label. The liner notes were written by Dr. Demento.

The Rhino box set release Anthology covers the first 15 years of Kottke's career and includes selections from the Takoma, Capitol, and Chrysalis releases along with extensive liner notes. Capitol later released another compilation package titled The Best of Leo Kottke. Chrysalis released Essential Leo Kottke covering Kottke's mid-career releases on that label. Blue Note Records also released two compilations, The Best of the Capitol Years and The Best of the Chrysalis Years on CD in 2003.

The Best was re-issued on CD by BGO (CD277) in 1996.

== Reception ==
Professional ratings
Review scores
Source	Rating
AllMusic	4.5/5 stars

In their 1996 review, Dirty Linen wrote "combining equal parts acoustic, electric, live, and vocal material, the compilation is an ideal introduction for new listeners".

In his AllMusic review, critic Thom Jurek called it "the best one for the money. Sonically, it is superior, using later-phase master technology, and its presentation is sleeker as well. The biggest asset here is that this collection does feature some of the more well-known vocal selections closely associated with the guitarist".

Music critic Robert Christgau stated: "Much as I admire John Fahey, I'm no aficionado of the school of solo guitar he inspired, and though I once complained that Kottke lacked Fahey's 'courage and clarity' I think what I really meant was genius—and I have no idea what that means. If a guest were to request Kottke I'd play Capitol's The Best twofer, which I enjoy under duress—the sides he doesn't sing on, that is."

== Track listing ==
- All songs by Leo Kottke except as noted.
- The four original sides were labeled, in order, Acoustic, Electric, Live, and Singing
- All songs taken from Mudlark, Greenhouse, Ice Water, My Feet are Smiling, Dreams and All That Stuff, and Chewing Pine
- The 1996 CD release included two discs.

=== Side one ===
1. "Machine No. 2" – 3:00
2. "Cripple Creek" (Traditional) – 3:07
3. "Bourée" (J. S. Bach) – 1:26
4. "When Shrimps Learn to Whistle" – 3:28
5. "Bill Cheatham" (Traditional) – 1:45
6. "The Song of the Swamp" – 3:00
7. "Last Steam Engine Train" (John Fahey) – 3:02

=== Side two ===
1. "Bean Time" – 2:32
2. "The Spanish Entomologist" – 2:19
3. "Short Stories" (Leo Kottke, Cal Hand) – 3:01
4. "Hole in the Day" – 2:50
5. "Mona Roy" – 1:48
6. "Venezuela, There You Go" – 3:08
7. "Monkey Lust" (Kottke, Fowley) – 1:48

=== Side three ===
1. "Busted Bicycle" – 2:37
2. "June Bug" – 2:06
3. "Eggtooth" (Kottke, Johnson) – 5:15
4. "Stealing" – 1:34
5. "Living in the Country" (Pete Seeger) – 1:36
6. Medley "Crow River Waltz" / "Jesu, Joy of Man's Desiring" (J. S. Bach) / "Jack Fig" – 7:20

=== Side four ===
1. "Standing in My Shoes" (Kottke, Bruce) – 4:01
2. "Bumblebee" – 3:39
3. "Eight Miles High" (Roger McGuinn, David Crosby, Gene Clark) – 3:33
4. "Tilt Billings and the Student Prince" (Leo Kottke, Ron Nagle) – 4:56
5. "Pamela Brown" (Tom T. Hall) – 4:02
6. "Standing on the Outside" (Leo Kottke, Mary Kottke) – 2:29
7. "Power Failure" (Gary Brooker, Keith Reid) – 2:20

== Personnel ==
- Leo Kottke - 6 & 12-string guitar, vocals
- Bill Barber - piano
- Bill Berg - drums
- Kenny Buttrey - drums
- Roy Estrada - bass
- Kim Fowley - vocals
- Cal Hand - pedal steel guitar
- Paul Lagos - drums
- Wayne Moss - bass
- Larry Taylor - bass
