= The Instrumentals: The Best of the Chrysalis Years =

Instrumentals: The Best of the Chrysalis Years

Compilation album by Leo Kottke
- Released: Feb 11, 2003
- Recorded: 1976–1983
- Genre: Folk, new acoustic, American primitive guitar
- Label: Blue Note (42313)
- Producer: Denny Bruce, T-Bone Burnett, Kenny Buttrey, Leo Kottke

Leo Kottke chronology
Instrumentals: The Best of the Capitol Years (2003)	Instrumentals: The Best of the Chrysalis Years (2003)	Try and Stop Me (2004)

Instrumentals: The Best of the Chrysalis Years is a 2003 compilation of American guitarist Leo Kottke's releases on the Chrysalis label. It includes previously unreleased tracks. The Chrysalis release Essential covers the same time period, presenting a different line up of tracks.

== Reception ==
Professional ratings
Review scores
Source	Rating
AllMusic	4/5 stars
Encyclopedia of Popular Music	3/5 stars

Writing for AllMusic, music critic Ronnie D. Lankford Jr. wrote of the album "The tracks flow in chronological order, allowing the listener to follow the guitarist's evolution over his eight years with Chrysalis; and while the albums he recorded during this time may lack the edginess of his earlier material, the pieces on Instrumentals are consistently fresh and invigorating. Guitar hero wannabes, of course, will buy the album for the extra tracks; everyone else will find it a rewarding introduction to mid-period Kottke."

== Track listing ==
- All songs by Leo Kottke except as noted.
- All tracks are excerpted from Leo Kottke, Burnt Lips, Balance, Guitar Music, Live in Europe and Time Step, except as noted.
- ’’The Fisherman’’ is a previously unreleased live recording from a Montreux Jazz Festival appearance in 1977.
- The short version of "Little Martha" is a previously unreleased version.
- The version of "Airproofing" represented here is the original, not the later extended version.
1. "Airproofing" – 2:18
2. "Waltz" – 2:25
3. "Death by Reputation" – 4:10
4. "The Fisherman" – 2:48
5. "Up Tempo" – 1:53
6. "A Low Thud" – 3:07
7. "Orange Room" – 3:32
8. "Whine" – 3:32
9. "Dolores" – 4:11
10. "The Train and the Gate" – 2:42
11. "Open Country Joy: Theme and Adhesions" (Leo Kottke, John McLaughlin) – 7:00
12. "Wheels" (Norman Petty) – 2:20
13. "Palms Blvd." – 2:48
14. "Strange" – 2:34
15. "Jib’s Hat" – 2:24
16. "All I Have to Do is Dream" (Boudleaux Bryant, Felice Bryant) – 1:43
17. "Memories Are Made of This" (Frank Miller, Richard Dehr, Terry Gilkyson) – 2:37
18. "Little Martha" (Duane Allman) – 1:28

== Personnel ==
- Leo Kottke - 6 & 12-string guitar, vocals
- David Kemper - drums
- David Miner - bass
