= Greenhouse (Leo Kottke album) =

Studio album by Leo Kottke
- Released: January 1972
- Recorded: Sound 80
- Genre: Folk, new acoustic, American primitive guitar
- Length: 35:00
- Label: Capitol
- Producer: Denny Bruce

Leo Kottke chronology
| Mudlark (1971) | Greenhouse (1972) | My Feet Are Smiling (1973) |

Greenhouse is American guitarist Leo Kottke's fifth album, his second on the Capitol label, released in 1972. It was recorded in three days. From the liner notes: "In the sense that my guitars were once plants, this record's a greenhouse.” There are seven instrumentals and four vocals. It reached No. 127 on the Billboard 200 chart.

It was re-issued on CD by One Way Records in 1995.

== Reception ==
Professional ratings
Review scores
| Source | Rating |
|---|---|
| AllMusic | 3/5 stars |
| The Rolling Stone Record Guide | 5/5 stars |
| Encyclopedia of Popular Music | 4/5 stars |
| Hi-Fi News & Record Review | A:1 |

Writing for AllMusic, music critic Bruce Eder noted that the album was less ambitious than Kottke's previous release and wrote of the album, "... Greenhouse is a true solo record that offers several surprises. Over a third of it is made up of vocal numbers, including two that are absolutely superb... Some of the mastering isn't quite as clean here as it is on other titles in Kottke's catalog, but otherwise this is an acceptable reissue of an album that is, perhaps, underappreciated because of its relatively high concentration of vocal numbers by the guitarist."

== Track listing ==
All tracks are written by Leo Kottke, except where indicated.

Side one
| No. | Title | Writer(s) | Length |
|---|---|---|---|
| 1. | "Bean Time" | | 2:32 |
| 2. | "Tiny Island" | Al Gaylor | 3:46 |
| 3. | "The Song of the Swamp" | | 3:00 |
| 4. | "In Christ There Is No East or West" | John Fahey | 2:12 |
| 5. | "Last Steam Engine Train" | Fahey, Sam McGee | 3:00 |
| 6. | "From the Cradle to the Grave" | Kottke, Ron Nagle | 3:23 |

Side two
| No. | Title | Writer(s) | Length |
|---|---|---|---|
| 7. | "Louise" | Paul Siebel | 4:02 |
| 8. | "The Spanish Entomologist" | traditional; arranged by Kottke | 2:24 |
| 9. | "Owls" | | 5:00 |
| 10. | "You Don't Have to Need Me" | | 4:37 |
| 11. | "Lost John" | traditional; arranged by Kottke | 2:15 |
| Total length: | | | 35:00 |

== Personnel ==
- Leo Kottke – 6- & 12-string guitar, vocals
- Steve Gammell – second guitar on "Lost John"

== Production notes ==
- Producer: Denny Bruce (Takoma Productions)
- Recorded at Sound Eighty, Minneapolis, Minnesota
- Engineer: Paul "Shorty" Martinson
- Album Design: Good Time Graphix
- Photography & Artwork: Bill Matthews
