= Leo Kottke, Peter Lang & John Fahey =

Leo Kottke/Peter Lang/John Fahey

Compilation album by Leo Kottke, Peter Lang, John Fahey
- Released: 1974
- Genre: Folk, new acoustic, American primitive guitar
- Label: Takoma (TAK 2040)
- Producer: Kerry Fahey (Peter Lang selections)

Leo Kottke chronology
Dreams and All That Stuff (1974)	Leo Kottke/Peter Lang/John Fahey (1974)	Chewing Pine (1975)

John Fahey chronology
The Essential John Fahey (1974)	Leo Kottke/Peter Lang/John Fahey (1974)	Old Fashioned Love (1975)

Leo Kottke/Peter Lang/John Fahey is a split album by American guitarists Leo Kottke, Peter Lang, and John Fahey, released in 1974.

== History ==
Fahey had started a new genre of guitar music, known later as American primitive guitar, which comprised traditional fingerpicking steel string guitar techniques applied to neo-classical compositions. The Takoma label showcased such music and its roster included Kottke and Lang. Kottke's 6- and 12-String Guitar became a surprise hit and the profits funded an expansion of the label. Leo Kottke/Peter Lang/John Fahey was released to help gain greater exposure for Fahey and Lang as well as the label itself.

Each guitarist plays four solo pieces. The Fahey tracks are re-recordings of four well-known Fahey songs. Kottke would later re-record "Cripple Creek" and "Ice Miner" (on Mudlark).

== Cover ==
The cover contains the names of the three guitarists in a circle in order that none is listed first. Therefore, various discographies note the title in different manners. The spine, however, reads Leo Kottke/Peter Lang/John Fahey.

The back cover contains a comical or absurd biography of each artist as well as a description of Takoma Records: "Takoma Records is widely ignored as a freckle on the soft white underbelly of the record business. Intrepid and enterprising, this indigestible little company has an unblemished record. The unblemished record can be seen in its glass case at the Takoma archives between the hours of 6 midnight and 12."

== Reception ==
Professional ratings
Review scores
Source	Rating
AllMusic	4/5 stars

Music critic Richie Unterberger wrote that "While their performances here may not be their very best—you can turn to their solo albums for those—anyone who likes the artists will like what they offer here. Indeed, their approaches are similar enough that casual listeners may mistake this compilation for the work of a single artist."

In his 2008 Innerviews interview with Peter Lang, Anil Prasad claimed "To this day, one of the biggest-selling fingerstyle albums of all time remains John Fahey, Peter Lang & Leo Kottke."

== Track listing ==
No song times or composers were listed on the original label or jacket.

=== Side one ===
Leo Kottke:

1. "Cripple Creek"
2. "Ice Miner"
3. "Red and White"
4. "Anyway"
  Peter Lang:
5. "St. Charles Shuffle"
6. "When Kings Come Home"

=== Side two ===
1. "As I Lay Sleeping"
2. "Thoth Song"
  John Fahey:
3. "On the Sunny Side of the Ocean"
4. "Sunflower River Blues"
5. "Revolt of the Dyke Brigade"
6. "In Christ There is No East or West"

== Personnel ==
- Leo Kottke – guitar
- Peter Lang – guitar
- John Fahey – guitar

Production notes

- Peter Lang cuts produced by Kerry Fahey
- Mastered at United Sound, Burbank
- Album Art / Eric Monson & John Cabalka
