= Guitar Music =

Studio album by Leo Kottke
- Released: 1981
- Recorded: October and December 1980
- Studio: Sound 80, Minneapolis, MN
- Genre: Folk, new acoustic, American primitive guitar
- Length: 34:18
- Label: Chrysalis (CHR 1328)
- Producer: Leo Kottke

Leo Kottke chronology
Live in Europe (1980)	Guitar Music (1981)	Time Step (1983)

Guitar Music is an album by American guitarist Leo Kottke, released in 1981. The album is all solo guitar played on a Gibson J-45 and a Lundberg-Martin 12-string.

== Reception ==
Professional ratings
Review scores
Source	Rating
AllMusic	3/5 stars

Writing for AllMusic, music critic Chip Renner called the album "Twelve solid guitar instrumentals."

== Track listing ==
All songs by Leo Kottke except as noted.

=== Side one ===
1. "Part Two" – 1:41
2. "Available Space" (Ry Cooder) – 1:34
3. "Side One Suite":
  1. "Some Birds" – 0:59
  2. "Sounds Like..." – 1:28
  3. "Slang" – 2:42
  4. "My Double" – 2:05
  5. "Three Walls and Bars" – 2:13
  6. "Reprise: Some Birds" [Note: the CD cover is in error here]
4. "Perforated Sleep" – 2:44

=== Side two ===
1. "Strange" – 2:31
2. "Little Shoes" – 1:32
3. "Jib's Hat" – 2:15
4. "Tumbling Tumbleweeds" (Bob Nolan) – 2:41
5. "Agile N." – 1:49
6. "A Song for 'The Night of the Hunter'" – 3:06
7. "All I Have to Do Is Dream" (Boudleaux Bryant, Felice Bryant) – 1:42
8. "Sleep Walk" (Johnny Farina, Santo Farina, Ann Farina) – 2:20

== Personnel ==
- Leo Kottke - Acoustic 6- and 12-String Guitars

Production notes:

- Produced by Leo Kottke.
- Recorded in Minneapolis at Sound 80, October and December 1980.
- Engineers: Scott Rivard, Paul Martinson.
- Thanks to Jeff Roberts and Tom Mudge.
- Art Director: John Van Hamersveld
- Photo: Nick Rozsa.
