= Peculiaroso =

Studio album by Leo Kottke
- Released: 1994
- Recorded: Ocean Way (Hollywood); Conway (Hollywood)
- Genres: Folk, Americana, new acoustic, American primitive guitar
- Length: 36:23
- Label: Private Music (01005-82111-2)
- Producer: Rickie Lee Jones

Leo Kottke chronology
Essential (1991)	Peculiaroso (1994)	Live (1995)

Peculiaroso is an album by American guitarist Leo Kottke, released in 1994.

== History ==
Coming more than two years after the Great Big Boy album, where all tracks included vocal parts, Peculiaroso returned to Kottke's usual mix of vocal and instrumental selections. The album included several notable cover versions, including an instrumental take on the Sutherland Brothers' "Arms of Mary" and a version of Randall Hylton's "Room at the Top of the Stairs" which received some airplay on Adult Alternative radio.

The album was produced by singer-songwriter Rickie Lee Jones, who also provided backing vocals on several tracks. Kottke credited Jones with capturing a more spontaneous and relaxed feel on the recording than was typical of her own attempts.

Peculiaroso was re-released on CD as a "twofer" with Great Big Boy by Acadia (8182) on October 29, 2007.

== Reception ==
Professional ratings
Review scores
Source	Rating
AllMusic	3/5 stars
Encyclopedia of Popular Music	3/5 stars

Writing for Allmusic, music critic Jeff Crooke wrote of the album "... this release, well produced by Rickie Lee Jones, is at turns humorous, haunting, and highly enjoyable."

== Track listing ==
All songs by Leo Kottke except as noted

1. "Peg Leg" – 3:27
2. "Poor Boy" (Bukka White, John Fahey) – 3:07
3. "Parade" – 2:49
4. "Wonderland by Night" (Klaus Gunter-Newman, Lincoln Chase) – 3:30
5. "World Made to Order" – 3:47
6. "Room Service (At the Tahiti Hotel)" – 2:52
7. "Turning into Randolph Scott (Humid Child)" – 3:42
8. "Porky and Pale" – 2:26
9. "Arms of Mary" (Ian Sutherland) – 3:06
10. "The Room at the Top of the Stairs" (Randall Hylton) – 2:41
11. "Big Situation" – 3:15
12. "Twilight Time" (Buck Ram, Morty Nevins, Al Nevins) – 1:50

== Personnel ==
- Leo Kottke – guitar, vocals
- Dean Parks – electric guitar
- Van Dyke Parks – accordion
- John Leftwich – bass
- Bill Berg – drums
- Brad Dutz – percussion
- Rickie Lee Jones – vocals
- Syd Straw – vocals
- Teresa Tudbury – vocals

Production notes:

- Produced by Rickie Lee Jones
- Recorded and Mixed: Paul duGre
- Assistant engineers: Dan Bosworth, Mark Duilbeault, Noel Hazen & Marnie Riley
- Mastered by Joe Gastwirt
