= Leo Kottke (album) =

Studio album by Leo Kottke
- Released: 1976
- Recorded: Four different studios
- Genre: Folk, new acoustic, American primitive guitar
- Length: 30:05
- Label: Chrysalis
- Producer: Denny Bruce

Leo Kottke chronology
| Leo Kottke: 1971–1976 (1976) | Leo Kottke (1976) | The Best (1978) |

Leo Kottke is the first album on the Chrysalis label by American guitarist Leo Kottke, released in 1976. It reached #107 on the Billboard Pop Albums charts.

== History ==
After six releases on Capitol, Kottke and his manager/producer Denny Bruce changed labels. This release of all instrumental pieces written by Kottke (with the exception of "Buckaroo") also includes orchestrations by Jack Nitzsche.

The composition "Airproofing" was significantly re-worked and released as "Airproofing II" on Kottke's A Shout Toward Noon. "Death by Reputation" was covered by John Fahey on his album John Fahey Visits Washington D.C..

It was reissued on CD by BGO in 1996.

== Reception ==
Professional ratings
Review scores
| Source | Rating |
|---|---|
| AllMusic | 3/5 stars |
| Encyclopedia of Popular Music | 4/5 stars |

Writing for AllMusic, music critic Chip Renner called the album "Very good guitar playing."

== Track listing ==
All songs by Leo Kottke, except where indicated

=== Side One ===
1. "Buckaroo" (Bob Morris) – 2:05
2. "The White Ape" – 2:13
3. "Hayseed Suede" – 2:45
4. "Rio Leo" – 2:58
5. "Range" – 3:26
6. "Airproofing" – 2:19

=== Side Two ===
1. "Maroon" – 2:02
2. "Waltz" – 2:25
3. "Death by Reputation" – 4:07
4. "Up Tempo" – 1:41
5. "Shadowland" – 4:05

== Personnel ==
- Leo Kottke - 6 & 12-string guitar
- Other artists not credited

Production notes:

- Recorded by Ern Rose at Armstrong Studios, Melbourne
  Scott Rivard and Paul Martinson at Sound 80, Minneapolis
  Dave Hassinger at the Sound Factory West, Los Angeles
  Douglas Decker at Western Recording, Los Angeles
- Re-mix: Scott Rivard, Sound 80
- Photographic Collage by John Van Hamersveld
- Arrangements by Jack Nitzsche
- Produced by Denny Bruce
