= Balance (Leo Kottke album) =

Studio album by Leo Kottke
- Released: 1978
- Genre: Folk, Americana, new acoustic, American primitive guitar
- Length: 32:44
- Label: Chrysalis (CHR 1234)
- Producer: Kenny Buttrey

Leo Kottke chronology
Burnt Lips (1978)	Balance (1978)	Live in Europe (1980)

Balance is an album by American guitarist Leo Kottke, released in 1978.

It was re-issued on CD by BGO Records (263) in 1996.

On this album, only Whine and Dolores are Kottke's familiar acoustic guitar solos. 1/2-Acre of Garlic is a unique blend of acoustic guitar wizardry and Kottke's vocal, with electric guitar and bass supporting. Learning the Game is a straight ballad rendition of the Buddy Holly classic. The remaining tracks are essentially rock songs. Even Embryonic Journey is given more of a rock band style of treatment than in Jefferson Airplane's original version.

Professional ratings
Review scores
Source	Rating
Allmusic	3/5 stars

== Track listing ==
All songs by Leo Kottke except as noted.

=== Side one ===
1. "Tell Mary" – 2:59
2. "I Don't Know Why" – 2:30
3. "Embryonic Journey" (Jorma Kaukonen) – 3:15
4. "Disguise – 3:09
5. "Whine" – 3:28

=== Side two ===
1. "Losing Everything" – 2:32
2. "Drowning" – 3:16
3. "Dolores" – 4:09
4. "1/2-Acre of Garlic" – 2:43
5. "Learning the Game" (Buddy Holly) – 4:06

== Personnel ==
- Leo Kottke – acoustic guitar, vocals
- Kenneth Buttrey – drums, clavinet (on “Disguise”)
- Mike Leech – bass
- Bobby Ogdin – piano
- John Harris – piano

Production notes:

- Produced by Kenneth Buttrey
- Engineered and remixed by Marty Lewis
- Recorded at Quadrafonic Sound Studios,
  mixed at Westlake Audio,
  mastered at Mastering Lab by Mike Reese
- Assistant engineers: Jimmy Fitzpatrick, Connie Potter, Paul Ray
- Art direction: John Van Hamersveld
- Photography: Larry Williams
