= Burnt Lips =

Studio album by Leo Kottke
- Released: 1978
- Recorded: Leo Kottke's home
- Genre: Folk, new acoustic, American primitive guitar
- Length: 40:47
- Label: Chrysalis (CHR 1191)
- Producer: Leo Kottke

Leo Kottke chronology
The Best (1976)	Burnt Lips (1978)	Balance (1978)

Burnt Lips is an album by American guitarist Leo Kottke, released in 1978. It peaked at No. 143 on the Billboard Pop Albums chart.

== History ==
Burnt Lips includes two selections from the soundtrack of Terrence Malick's film Days of Heaven. Only one is heard in the movie; an abbreviation of "The Train and the Gate." The album was recorded by Kottke in his home using Sound 80 Studio's mobile recording unit.

Although Kottke did not release an album in 1977, he produced and played on The Wylie Butler by Cal Hand (Takoma TAK C-1056), a Minneapolis pedal steel and dobro player who had played on numerous Capitol releases for Leo.

== Reception ==
Professional ratings
Review scores
Source	Rating
AllMusic	3/5 stars
The Encyclopedia of Popular Music	3/5 stars
The Rolling Stone Album Guide	3/5 stars

AllMusic critic Mark Allen wrote: "The subjects of death and betrayal permeate this understandably dark album... His always problematic singing assumes a prominent role, which might not be the best strategy. He showcases his string wizardry on 'A Dull [sic] Thud' and several other instrumentals."

== Track listing ==
All songs by Leo Kottke except as noted.

Side one

1. "Endless Sleep" (Nick Lowe) – 3:37
2. "Cool Water" (Bob Nolan) – 2:25
3. "Frank Forgets" – 2:09
4. "Sonora's Death Row" (Kevin Blackie Farrell) – 4:30
5. "The Quiet Man" – 2:05
6. "Everybody Lies" – 2:19
7. "I Called Back" – 2:38

Side two

1. "A Low Thud" – 3:07
2. ""Orange Room" – 3:33
3. "The Credits: Out-takes from Terry's Movie" – 3:46
4. "Voluntary Target – 2:58
5. "Burnt Lips" – 2:07
6. "Sand Street" – 1:46
7. "The Train and the Gate: From Terry's Movie" – 3:18

== Charts ==
Chart (1978)	Peak position
Australia (Kent Music Report)	77

== Personnel ==
- Leo Kottke—acoustic guitar, vocals

Production notes:

- Produced by Leo Kottke
- Recorded with Sound 80’s remote
- Engineered by Jeff Roberts, Tom Mudge and Scott Rivard
- Photo and Design—John Van Hamersveld
