= My Feet Are Smiling =

Live album by Leo Kottke
- Released: March 1973
- Recorded: December 19–20, 1972
- Venue: Tyrone Guthrie Theater, Minneapolis, Minnesota
- Genre: Folk, new acoustic, American primitive guitar
- Length: 43:33
- Label: Capitol
- Producer: Denny Bruce

Leo Kottke chronology
Greenhouse (1972)	My Feet Are Smiling (1973)	Ice Water (1974)

My Feet Are Smiling is American guitarist Leo Kottke's sixth album, and his second album recorded live. It reached No. 108 on the Billboard Pop Albums charts.

== History ==
The songs were recorded December 19 and 20, 1972 at the Tyrone Guthrie Theater in Minneapolis, Minnesota, the majority of the album's content being from the second night. "Blue Dot" was written three days before the concert.

The album was re-issued on CD in 1994 by BGO and in 1996 by One Way Records.

== Reception ==
Professional ratings
Review scores
Source	Rating
AllMusic	4.5/5 stars
The Encyclopedia of Popular Music	4/5 stars
The Rolling Stone Record Guide	5/5 stars

For AllMusic, Mark Allen wrote: "The prodigious technique, deadpan sense of humor, and infamous singing are all evident less than a minute into the opening tune. Performing solo and playing more slide guitar than usual, Kottke wows a supportive hometown audience in Minneapolis with some of the finest playing of his career."

== Track listing ==
All pieces by Leo Kottke except as noted.

=== Side one ===
1. "Hear the Wind Howl" – 3:10
2. "Busted Bicycle" – 2:40
3. "Easter" – 3:19
4. "Louise" (Paul Siebel) – 4:26
5. "Blue Dot" – 2:58
6. "Stealing" – 3:03
7. "Living in the Country" (Pete Seeger) – 1:38

=== Side two ===
1. "June Bug" – 2:06
2. "Standing in My Shoes" (Leo Kottke, Denny Bruce) – 2:50
3. "The Fisherman" – 2:43
4. "Bean Time" – 2:15
5. "Eggtooth" (Leo Kottke, Michael Johnson) – 5:15
6. Medley: "Crow River Waltz" / "Jesu, Joy of Man's Desiring" (Johann Sebastian Bach) / "Jack Fig" – 7:20

== Charts ==
Chart (1974)	Peak position
Australia (Kent Music Report)	93

== Personnel ==
- Leo Kottke - 6- & 12-string guitar, vocals

== Production notes ==
- Recorded on location and mastered by Sound 80, Minneapolis, Minnesota
- Engineer - Paul "Spockets" Martinson
- Art Direction and Design - John Van Hamersveld
- Photography - Norman Seeff
- Producer - Denny Bruce for Takoma Productions
