= Live in Europe (Leo Kottke album) =

Live album by Leo Kottke
- Released: 1980
- Genre: Folk, new acoustic, American primitive guitar
- Label: Chrysalis (CHR 1284)
- Producer: Leo Kottke

Leo Kottke chronology
Balance (1978)	Live in Europe (1980)	Guitar Music (1981)

Live in Europe is a live album by American guitarist Leo Kottke, released in 1980. The title "Palms Blvd." is only available as a live performance.

Live in Europe was re-released on CD by BGO in 1996.

== Reception ==
Professional ratings
Review scores
Source	Rating
AllMusic	3/5 stars

Writing for AllMusic, music critic Murrday Fisher wrote of the album "... exemplary folk guitar... Fans who enjoy Kottke's earlier albums, like Ice Water and Chewing Pine, will also appreciate this follow-up."

== Track listing ==
All songs by Leo Kottke except as noted.

=== Side one ===
1. "The Train and the Gate" – 2:48
2. "Open Country Joy: Theme and Adhesions" – 7:06
3. "Airproofing" – 4:30
4. "Tell Mary" – 3:14

=== Side two ===
1. "Wheels" (Norman Petty) – 2:19
2. "Up Tempo" – 1:58
3. "Palms Blvd." – 2:45
4. "Shadowland" – 4:09
5. "Eggtooth" – 5:34

Two bonus tracks were included in the CD release:

1. "Pamela Brown" (Tom T. Hall) – 4:14
2. "Range" – 3:50

== Personnel ==
- Leo Kottke - acoustic guitar, vocals

Production notes:

- Produced by Leo Kottke
- Engineered by Robert Collins and Jeff Hooper
- Mastered by George Peckham
