= Sixty Six Steps =

Studio album by Mike Gordon and Leo Kottke
- Released: August 23, 2005 (US)
- Recorded: Folk, Americana, new acoustic, American primitive guitar
- Length: 50:08
- Label: RCA Victor
- Producer: David Z

Leo Kottke chronology
Try and Stop Me (2004)	Sixty Six Steps (2005)

Mike Gordon chronology
Inside In (2003)	Sixty Six Steps (2005)	Live From Bonnaroo 2005 (2005)

Sixty Six Steps is the second studio album from Leo Kottke and Mike Gordon. It was released on August 23, 2005.

== History ==
Although the album was recorded in just a few months, it has been an idea in Gordon's mind for decades. Since Gordon went on a trip to the Bahamas with his family in his childhood, he has always been fascinated with the calypso band, The Mustangs. “Ya Mar,” one of the songs Gordon heard on the trip, eventually became a staple of Phish’s live shows.

Most of the songs were written and arranged in Costa Rica and were then recorded in Nassau, Bahamas.

Percussionist Neil Symonette is also featured playing a multitude of percussion including caxixi, goats' hooves, talking drums, tire hub, djembe, thrasher, fish shakers, and uda drums.

The album also features a number of cover songs, ranging from Fleetwood Mac's "Oh Well" to Pete Seeger's "Living in the Country."

== Reception ==
Professional ratings
Review scores
Source	Rating
AllMusic	3.5/5 stars
Glide Magazine	4/5 stars
Minor 7th	(not rated)
PopMatters	8/10 stars

Writing for AllMusic, critic Hal Horowitz called the album "breezy" and singled out the musicianship over the songwriting and singing. "The musicians work wonderfully together, with Gordon's meaty yet malleable bass grounding and darting around Kottke's distinctive and agile fingerpicked lines," said Horowitz. Eric Ward of Glide magazine wrote favorably of the collaboration saying "You can bet a sand dollar this ends up on quite a few "Best of '05" lists." and like Horowitz, commented on the surprising cover songs. For PopMatters, critic Nikki Tranter called the album "A calypso-laced stylish slice of wonderful, Sixty Six Steps uses jaunty island influences to create a tranquil, unaffected reminder of life’s quiet spaces... Sixty Six Steps doesn’t feel like a calypso record. It’s exactly as it’s meant to be—an experiment in flavors, perfectly blended."

Writing for Minor 7th, Patrick Ragains felt the album was "... a few steps short" and praised Kottke's solo, "From Spink to Correctionville," as "a welcome respite from the rest of the program's bass and midrange clutter." He further commented "Gordon's bass playing is interesting and effective, but sometimes muddies things when competing for attention with Kottke's bass runs on the guitar. The original songs fall flat both musically and lyrically. This is also true of several covers... Gordon handles electric guitar on several tracks, but his playing is trite and fails to generate any fire in the treble register. Likewise, Kottke's accompaniments and unfocused comping fail to lend any energy to the arrangements." Aaron Stein of Jambase commented on the musical relationship between Kottke and Gordon as "it seems that these musicians were made for each other" and "a quirky, amiable weirdness held down by a simple, cozy music."

Andrew Kotick of Sputnikmusic compared the release to Clone and concluded "The results were in vain of the record's predecessor... The music is exactly what you would describe as a soundtrack to a Hawaiian honeymoon. It is as if the two took the music from Clone and put in a key change with different lyrics. This doesn't mean it's bad to any extent, but I would've enjoyed some originality."

The album was awarded "Studio Album of the Year" at the 2006 Jammy Awards.

== Track listing ==
1. "Living In The Country" (Pete Seeger) – 3:51
2. "The Grid" (Gordon) – 3:17
3. "Oh Well" (Peter Green) – 3:22
4. "Rings' (Alex Harvey, Eddie Reeves) – 4:30
5. "Cherry County" (Kottke) – 2:30
6. "Sweet Emotion" (Tom Hamilton, Steven Tyler) – 5:32
7. "The Stolen Quiet" (Gordon) – 3:06
8. "Balloon" (Kottke) – 3:26
9. "Over The Dam" (Gordon, Linitz) – 3:40
10. "Can't Hang" (Gordon) – 1:54
11. "From Spink to Correctionville" (Kottke) – 2:28
12. "Ya Mar" (Cyril Ferguson) – 5:01
13. "Twice" (Kottke) – 4:10
14. "Invisible" (Gordon, Linitz) – 4:01

== Personnel ==
- Leo Kottke – guitar, vocals
- Mike Gordon – bass, guitar, vocals
- Neil Symonette – drums, percussion
