= A Shout Toward Noon =

Studio album by Leo Kottke
- Released: 1986
- Recorded: The Record Plant, Los Angeles; Studio M, Minneapolis
- Genres: Folk, new acoustic, American primitive guitar
- Length: 41:19
- Label: Private Music (2007-4-P)
- Producer: Buell Neidlinger

Leo Kottke chronology
Voluntary Target (1984)	A Shout Toward Noon (1986)	Regards from Chuck Pink (1988)

A Shout Toward Noon is an album by American guitarist Leo Kottke, released in 1986.

== History ==
A Shout Toward Noon is Kottke's first recording on the Private Music label after a three-year sabbatical, largely due to a difficult tendinitis injury in his hand. Due to the injury, Kottke left the thumb and finger picks that helped define his early style behind, and came back with a new sound. The album features somewhat heavier use of electronic synthesizers. Kottke also stated in a Billboard story, "I've been taking a break to see what would develop. I also finally learned to read music."

Prior to this release, Kottke composed and recorded the soundtrack for the 1985 Tri-Star Pictures film Little Treasure. He also composed and recorded the soundtrack for the 1986 film Fat Guy Goes Nutzoid.

== Reception ==
Professional ratings
Review scores
Source	Rating
AllMusic	4/5 stars

Writing for AllMusic, music critic Richard Foss wrote of the album "Though the opening cuts are typical Leo Kottke instrumentals — bouncy guitar pieces with nods to jazz, folk, and blues — A Shout Toward Noon is dominated by more moody, somber tunes... This isn't to say that there are no bright moments, just that the musical dynamic of this entire album is wider than usual. A Shout Toward Noon is in fact one of Kottke's most intriguing albums, one which amply rewards repeated listening."

== Track listing ==
All songs by Leo Kottke except as noted. The CD release has a slightly different running order.

=== Side one ===
1. "Little Beaver" – 1:49
2. "A Trout Toward Noon" – 2:51
3. "Little Martha" (Duane Allman) – 2:37
4. "Easter Again" – 3:07
5. "Piece 17" (Mauro Giuliani) – 2:05
6. "Three Quarter North" – 3:26
7. "Echoeing Gilewitz" (Richard Gilewitz) – 3:01

=== Side two ===
1. "First To Go" – 5:08
2. "Air Proofing Two" – 5:10
3. "A Virtuoso is His Own Reward" – 4:00
4. "Four Four North" – 2:32
5. "The Ice Field" – 6:56

== Personnel ==
- Leo Kottke – acoustic guitar
- Randy Kerber - synthesizer
- Buell Neidlinger – cello

== Production notes ==
- Produced by Buell Neidlinger
- Engineered by Dan Wallin and Rick Winquest
