= Mudlark (album) =

- Cover photo taken from the Mt. Wilson Observatory Parking Lot—southwest view above Los Angeles, January 10, 1971.

Studio album by Leo Kottke
- Released: 1971
- Recorded: Los Angeles and Nashville, TN
- Studio: Sound Factory (Hollywood, California); Cinderella Sound (Nashville, Tennessee)
- Genre: Folk, new acoustic, American primitive guitar
- Length: 35:28
- Label: Capitol (ST-682)
- Producer: Denny Bruce

Leo Kottke chronology
Circle Round the Sun (1970)	Mudlark (1971)	Greenhouse (1972)

Mudlark is American guitarist Leo Kottke's fourth album, his first on a major label (Capitol) and his first to feature other musicians. It reached #168 on the Billboard Pop Albums charts.

== History ==
Recording started in Los Angeles and later moved to Nashville. Four of the cuts were recorded at Cinderella Sound, Wayne Moss' garage studio in Nashville. The song "Room 8" is titled after a neighborhood cat named Room 8 who wandered into a classroom in 1952 at Elysian Heights Elementary School in Echo Park, California and lived at the school each winter, leaving in the summer.

It was re-issued by BGO Records (CD101) in 1990 and by One Way Records in 1995.

== Reception ==
Professional ratings
Review scores
Source	Rating
AllMusic	4/5 stars

Writing for AllMusic, music critic Jim Esch wrote of the album, "A landmark early album, Mudlark increased Kottke's visibility and helped establish his reputation as a homegrown American original."

== Track listing ==
All songs by Leo Kottke except as noted.

=== Side one ===
1. "Cripple Creek" ★ (Traditional; arranged by Leo Kottke) – 1:59
2. "Eight Miles High" (Gene Clark, Roger McGuinn, David Crosby) – 3:35
3. "June Bug" – 2:15
4. "The Ice Miner" – 2:00
5. "Bumblebee" ★ – 3:40
6. "Stealing" – 1:38
7. "Monkey Lust" (Kottke, Kim Fowley) – 1:49

=== Side two ===
1. "Poor Boy" (Bukka White, John Fahey) – 2:06
2. "Lullaby" – 3:20
3. "Machine #2" ★ – 3:01
4. "Hear the Wind Howl" – 2:59
5. "Bourée" (J. S. Bach) – 1:26
6. "Room 8" – 2:59
7. "Standing in My Shoes" ★ (Leo Kottke, Denny Bruce) – 3:11

== Personnel ==
- Leo Kottke—6 & 12-string acoustic guitar, bottleneck National steel guitar, vocals
- Roy Estrada—bass (on track 2)
- Paul “Fast Foot” Lagos—drums (on tracks 2, 3, 7, 8, 9, and 11)
- Larry Taylor—bass (on tracks 3, 7, and 9)
- Kenneth Buttrey—drums, percussion, cowbell (on tracks 1, 5, 10, and 14)
- John Harris—piano (on tracks 1, 5, and 14)
- Juke Box Phantom (actually Kim Fowley)—guest vocalist extraordinaire (on track 7)
- Pat Smith—bass (on track 11)
- Jeffrey Kaplan—piano (on tracks 8 and 11)
- Wayne Moss—bass (on tracks 1, 5, 8, 10, and 14)

== Production notes ==
- Produced by Denny Bruce and John Fahey
  Recorded at The Sound Factory, Hollywood, Calif.
  Engineer—Dave Hassinger
- ★ Produced by Denny Bruce and Michael Sunday
  Recorded at Cinderella Sound, Nashville, Tennessee
  Engineer—Wayne Moss
- Album Design and Photographs by John Van Hamersveld
