= Time Step =

Time Step may refer to:

- Time step, a rhythmic tap combination in tap dancing
- Time Step (album), a 1983 album by Leo Kottke
