= Clone (Leo Kottke and Mike Gordon album) =

Studio album by Mike Gordon & Leo Kottke
- Released: October 8, 2002
- Recorded: 2002
- Genre: Folk, Americana, new acoustic, American primitive guitar
- Length: 41:51
- Label: RCA Victor
- Producer: Paul DuGre

Leo Kottke chronology
One Guitar, No Vocals (1999)	Clone (2002)	Instrumentals: The Best of the Capitol Years (2003)

Mike Gordon chronology
Clone (2002)	Inside In (2003)

Clone is the first studio album from Leo Kottke and Mike Gordon. It was released on October 8, 2002, and features the duo performing acoustic originals and cover songs on a variety of instruments.

== History ==
The roots of the odd pairing of Kottke, an acoustic guitarist in the midst of a 30-year career, and Gordon, the bassist from the rock band Phish, began back in the late 1980s when Kottke performed live at the University of Vermont. Both Gordon and Phish guitarist Trey Anastasio - students at UVM - attended the concert. Years later, Gordon sent Kottke a cassette tape of his own rearranged version of Kottke's "The Driving of the Year Nail." The duo considered collaborating in the future, and finally began working together in the midst of Phish's two-and-a-half-year hiatus.

== Reception ==
Professional ratings
Review scores
Source	Rating
AllMusic	4/5 stars
Encyclopedia of Popular Music	3/5 stars

Writing for AllMusic, music critic Tom Semioli wrote of the album "Phish bassist Mike Gordon and acoustic guitar virtuoso Leo Kottke are a natural multi-faceted collaboration... A timeless record by two artists on an organic journey. Take the ride."

== Track listing ==
1. "Arko" (Gordon, Kottke) – 1:23
2. "Car Carrier Blues" (Gordon, Linitz) – 3:50
3. "From Pizza Towers to Defeat" (Bob "Frizz" Fuller) – 3:08
4. "Clone" (Gordon) – 4:51
5. "The Collins Missile" (Gordon) – 4:01
6. "Te Veo" (Kottke) – 2:33
7. "Disco" (Kottke) – 3:10
8. "June" (Gordon, Kottke) – 3:03
9. "I Am a Lonesome Fugitive" (Liz Anderson, Casey Anderson) – 3:07
10. "Clay" (Gordon, Linitz) – 3:03
11. "Strange" (Kottke) – 1:12
12. "Middle of the Road" (Kottke) – 2:55
13. "Whip" (Gordon, Kottke) – 2:29
14. "With" (Gordon, Linitz) – 2:46

== Personnel ==
- Leo Kottke - guitar, vocals, percussion
- Mike Gordon - bass, vocals, guitar, percussion
