= Billy Barber (musician) =

- Occupations: keyboardist, composer

Billy Barber is a keyboardist and composer. He is the son of pianist William C. Barber, also known as Bill Barber Sr.

He is most noted for the theme song for All My Children in the 1990s as well as keyboardist for the jazz group Flim & the BB's (with Jimmy Johnson, Bill Berg, and Dick Oatts). His song "Little Things" has been covered by The Oak Ridge Boys along with "Love is Worth the Pain" which was covered by Ray Charles. He has composed music for children's videos, and numerous television and radio series including American Chronicles, Face the Nation and The Splendid Table.

== Discography ==
Solo albums

- Lighthouse (1986) (DMP)
- Shades of Gray (1986) (DMP)

With Flim & the BB's

- Flim & the BB's (1978) (DMP) (note: LP only)
- Tricycle (1983) (DMP)
- Tunnel (1984) (DMP)
- Big Notes (1985) (DMP)
- Neon (1987) (DMP)
- The Further Adventures of Flim & the BB's (1988) (DMP)
- New Pants (1990) (Warner Bros.)
- Vintage/Best of (1992) (DMP)
- This Is a Recording (1992) (Warner Bros.)
- Tricycle (1999) (SACD reissue) (DMP)

Other appearances

- Debb Johnson (1969) (Monolith)
- Ice Water – Leo Kottke (1974) (Capitol)
- Dreams and All That Stuff – Leo Kottke (1974) (Capitol)
- Chewing Pine – Leo Kottke (1975) (Capitol)
- The Best – Leo Kottke (1976) (Capitol)
- Taste of DMP (1989) (DMP)
- The Crossing – Red River (1998)
- Bouncing Shoes (2001)
- Hello On the Go (2003) Music Workshop for Kids
- Flying Home – Bill Camplin (2003)

== Soundtracks ==
- Mystery Science Theater 3000: The Movie (1996)
- Old Explorers (1991)
- American Chronicles (1990)
- All My Children (1990–1995)
- Rockin Road Trip (1986)
- Guiding Light (2002–2008)
