= Great Big Boy =

Studio album by Leo Kottke
- Released: 1991
- Recorded: Paul & Mike's Studio, Los Angeles
- Genres: Folk, Americana, new acoustic, American primitive guitar
- Length: 33:26
- Label: Private Music (01005-82087-2)
- Producer: Steve Berlin

Leo Kottke chronology
That's What (1990)	Great Big Boy (1991)	Essential (1991)

Great Big Boy is an album by American guitarist Leo Kottke, released in 1991.

== History ==
Kottke's fifth album on the Private Music label, Great Big Boy is unique in the later Kottke canon in that every song includes a vocal part. The disc consists of nine Kottke originals and a cover version of Johnny Cash's "I Still Miss Someone". Complementing the often-oblique song lyrics is a strange short story included in the liner notes.

Margo Timmins' vocals were recorded by Peter Moore at MDI Productions, Toronto, Canada.

Though Kottke would not release another studio album until 1994, he was a frequent guest on various projects. He guested on Joshua Judges Ruth (1992) and I Love Everybody (1994) for Lyle Lovett, Troubadour (1992) by Larry Long, Other Voices, Other Rooms by Nanci Griffith, Traffic From Paradise by Rickie Lee Jones (both 1993) and Out of the Valley (1994) by John Gorka.

Great Big Boy was re-released on CD as a "twofer" with Peculiaroso by Acadia (8182) on Oct 29, 2007.

== Reception ==
Professional ratings
Review scores
Source	Rating
AllMusic	4.5/5 stars
Encyclopedia of Popular Music	3/5 stars

Writing for AllMusic, music critic Chip Renner wrote of the album "Kottke sings on this record to good effect."

== Track listing ==
All songs by Leo Kottke except as noted.

1. "Running Up the Stairs" – 3:16
2. "The Other Day (near Santa Cruz)" – 2:55
3. "Great Big Boy" – 3:40
4. "Driver" – 3:34
5. "Pepe Hush" – 3:43
6. "Big Mob on the Hill" – 2:42
7. "Ice Cream" – 4:36
8. "Nothin' Works" – 2:54
9. "Summer's Growing Old" – 2:53
10. "I Still Miss Someone" (Johnny Cash, Roy Cash Jr.) – 3:28

== Personnel ==
- Leo Kottke - guitar, vocals
- Margo Timmins - backing vocals on 5
- Lyle Lovett - backing vocals on 6, 7, 8
- John Leftwich - bass 1, 3, 6, 8, 9, 10
- Alejandro "Alex" Acuña - drums, percussion on 1, 2, 4, 5, 6, 7, 8
- Robert Martin - keyboards on 1, 2, 4–8, 10; bass on 2, 5, 7, background vocals on 6
- Victor Bisetti - drums & percussion on 3 & 10
- Steve Kujala - flute on 3

== Production notes ==
- Produced by Steve Berlin
- Recording Engineer: Paul duGre
- Other engineers: Bob Schaper, Scott Stillman, Peter Moore
- Mastered by Doug Sax & Alan Yoshida
