= Ricky Peterson =

American keyboardist, singer, songwriter and producer

- Born: Ricky Peterson
- Origin: United States
- Genres: Jazz, funk, pop, rock
- Occupations: Keyboardist, singer, songwriter, producer
- Instruments: Keyboards, vocals
- Years active: 1980s–present
- Website: rickypeterson.com

Ricky Peterson is an American keyboardist, singer, songwriter and producer. He is the brother of Paul Peterson (bass guitarist/singer/songwriter/keyboardist) and Billy Peterson (bass guitarist/songwriter/producer). His notable work includes producing and arranging the hit Prince song "The Most Beautiful Girl in the World" and performing on tour with David Sanbourn and Stevie Nicks.
