= Tim Ware =

American composer and musician (born 1948)

- Tim Ware in 1981. Photo by Steve Smith.

Background information
- Born: October 26, 1948 (age 77)
- Origin: Sacramento, California, US
- Genres: folk, chamber jazz, Soundtracks
- Occupations: Musician, songwriter, Web developer
- Instruments: Mandolin, Guitar
- Years active: 1977–present
- Labels: Rounder Records, Kaleidoscope Records, Varrick Records
- Website: timware.com

Tim Ware (born October 26, 1948) is an American composer and musician, born in Sacramento, California. He is also the owner of HyperArts, a Web design and development company located in the San Francisco Bay Area, in Oakland, California.

== The Tim Ware Group ==
Tim Ware came to prominence with the release, in 1980, of The Tim Ware Group on Kaleidoscope Records. The Tim Ware Group, working with a number of other talented San Francisco Bay Area musicians, helped define the emerging genre of New Acoustic Music. The band featured Tim, who also composed all the music, on mandolin and guitar, Bob Alekno on guitar and mandolin, John Tenney on violin, Sharon O'Connor on cello and Kenneth Miller on acoustic bass. The album also featured David Grisman, Darol Anger and Mike Marshall on the mandolin quartet piece "Spiral Moons" (which Rosanne Cash cited as one of her favorite tunes in a Down Beat magazine article from that period). In the spring of 1980, "Spiral Moons" had its world premiere at the Great American Music Hall in San Francisco, performed by Tim, Darol, Mike, and Mark O'Connor, and a few months later, this same quartet reprised that performance at the Kuumbwa Jazz Center in Santa Cruz, California. The album photography was done by former Rolling Stone chief photographer Baron Wolman.

The Tim Ware Group released their second album, Shelter From The Norm, on Rounder Records, with David Balakrishnan replacing John Tenney on violin. Although the Tim Ware Group, in the mandolin-based edition, disbanded in 1985, the music generates interest to this day (Tim was featured as Artist of the Week on the Mandozine website.). The album cover art was designed and created by noted designer and artist Michael Cronan.

=== The Tim Ware Group, v.2 ===
In 1985, Tim formed the Tim Ware Group v2, with Tim playing guitar, David Balakrishnan (now in The Turtle Island String Quartet) on violin, George Brooks on saxophone, Mark van Wageningen on electric bass and the late Paul van Wageningen on drums. The band toured and recorded and disbanded in 1995.

In 1992, Tim composed "Los Surf" for inclusion on the debut album by Teisco Del Rey (aka Dan Forte), "The Many Moods of Teisco Del Rey." And in 1996, Tim reimagined "The Theme From Lawrence of Arabia" as a classic surf music epic, which was featured on Teisco's second release, "Teisco Del Rey Plays Music For Lovers."

== HyperArts Web Design ==
In 1997, Tim started HyperArts Web Design, which remains a thriving business, developing websites and Facebook Fan Pages for clients such as Bare Escentuals, Autodesk, Popchips, UC San Francisco, and many others.

Tim is also the creator and curator of ThomasPynchon.com and PynchonWiki.com, the Web's largest and most popular resources for American novelist Thomas Pynchon. In 2000, Tim was interviewed for and featured in a feature-length documentary on the seldom-seen American author.

== Soundtrack Composition ==
In recent years, Tim has scored and performed the soundtracks for several Oregon Public Broadcasting documentaries, two of which have won Emmy Awards, and he continues to experiment with musical sound. In 2006, his music was used as the soundtrack for the BBC Radio 4 drama Monkeyface. In 2018, Tim was nominated for a Regional Emmy (Alaska-Pacific Northwest) for the musical score he composed and performed for the Oregon Public Broadcasting documentary "Broken Treaties" (2017), produced by Eric Cain.

== Current Musical Pursuits ==
In 2005, a "greatest hits" CD consisting of digitally remastered tunes from the Tim Ware Group's two albums was released by Menus and Music, a publishing company started by Sharon O'Connor.

Tim is currently at work on a full-length CD of surf and surf-inspired music.

== Discography ==
- The Tim Ware Group – 1980 Kaleidoscope Records
- Shelter From The Norm – 1983 Rounder/Varrick
- New Acoustic Music – 1985 Rounder/Ryko (one track)
- The Many Moods of Teisco Del Rey – 1992 Rounder Records (Composer)
- Plectrasonics – Nashville Mandolin Ensemble – 1995 CMH (Composer)
- Teisco Del Rey Plays Music For Lovers – 1996 Upstart Records (Composer)
- Baroque Brazilian & Contemporary – Enigmatica – 2004 Uncommon Strings (Composer)
