= Time Step (album) =

Studio album by Leo Kottke
- Released: 1983
- Recorded: Magnolia Sound, North Hollywood, CA
- Genre: Folk rock
- Length: 32:00
- Label: Chrysalis (PV 41411)
- Producer: T Bone Burnett

Leo Kottke chronology
Guitar Music (1981)	Time Step (1983)	Voluntary Target (1984)

Time Step is an album by American guitarist Leo Kottke, released in 1983.

== History ==
Time Step is Kottke's last recording on the Chrysalis label. It is the first of two Kottke albums produced by T-Bone Burnett, the second being My Father's Face. Guests include Albert Lee and Emmylou Harris.

After the release of Time Step Kottke went into a three-year seclusion. When he returned later in 1986, it was as a guest musician on The Blind Leading the Naked by Violent Femmes, then his own releases with a new direction and picking style.

Time Step was re-issued on CD by BGO (CD255) in 1995.

Professional ratings
Review scores
Source	Rating
AllMusic	4.5/5 stars
The Encyclopedia of Popular Music	4/5 stars

== Track listing ==
All songs by Leo Kottke except as noted.

=== Side one ===
1. "Running All Night Long" – 2:44
2. "The Bungle Party" – 3:00
3. "Rings" (Eddie Reeves, Alex Harvey) – 2:53
4. "Mr. Fonebone" – 2:05
5. "Julie's House" – 3:24
6. "Memories Are Made of This" (Frank Miller, Richard Dehr, Terry Gilkyson) – 2:38

=== Side two ===
1. "Saginaw, Michigan" (Bill Anderson, Don Wayne) – 3:37
2. "I'll Break Out Again" (Sanger D. Shafer, A. L. Owens) – 3:26
3. "The Wrong Track" – 2:44
4. "Starving" – 2:55
5. "Here Comes That Rainbow Again" (Kris Kristofferson) – 3:11

== Personnel ==
- Leo Kottke - acoustic guitar, vocals
- David Kemper - drums
- David Miner - bass
- Albert Lee - guitar on "Starving" and "Julies House", background vocals
- Emmylou Harris - background vocals
- Don Heffington - drums and percussion on "The Wrong Track"
- Dennis Keely - percussion on "The Bungle Party" and "Running All Night Long"

Production notes:

- Produced by T Bone Burnett
- Engineered by Donivan Cowart
- Second engineer: Alan Vashon
