= Richard Gilewitz =

- Born: San Diego, U.S.
- Genres: Fingerstyle guitar, blues, folk
- Occupation: Musician
- Instrument: Guitar

Richard Gilewitz is an American acoustic guitarist. He is known for his use of the fingerstyle technique.

== Biography ==
Gilewitz was born in San Diego and was raised in Cherry Hill, New Jersey, and Huntsville, Alabama. He attended the University of Alabama, obtaining degrees in computer science, mathematics and music. After graduating, he worked in a range of computer-related jobs for several years, including flight simulator design and in the satellite industry, before deciding to become a full-time guitarist. He lived in Inverness, Florida, for 30 years before moving to Chicago.

== Musical style ==
Gilewitz specializes in fingerstyle guitaring, using both standard six-string and twelve-string guitars. He generally does not sing and his compositions are exclusively instrumental. He often incorporates audience interaction and storytelling into his performances, especially from the history of acoustic guitars and the genres they are used in.

His guitar style has been compared to Leo Kottke and John Fahey. He himself cites early blues artists such as Blind Lemon Jefferson and Robert Johnson as his major influences.

Kottke's song "Echoing Gilewitz" is a cover of Gilewitz's composition, "Echoing Wilderness."
