= Try and Stop Me =

Try And Stop Me

Studio album by Leo Kottke
- Released: June 22, 2004
- Recorded: Studio M, Minneapolis, MN, Sunset Sound, Hollywood, CA
- Length: 45:15
- Label: RCA Victor/BMG
- Producer: Leo Kottke, Steve Berlin

Leo Kottke chronology
The Instrumentals: The Best of the Chrysalis Years (2003)	Try And Stop Me (2004)	Sixty Six Steps (2005)

Try And Stop Me (2004) is the most recent studio album by guitarist Leo Kottke. It contains some of Kottke's first forays into improvisation. All songs are unaccompanied guitar solos with the exception of "Banks of Marble" in which Kottke is supported by the band Los Lobos.

Kottke plays a new arrangement of Carla Bley's "Jesus Maria" here, his third recorded version of the song. Besides the version on That's What, he contributed another recording of the song to a promotional album titled Sounds of Wood and Steel (1997) released by Taylor Guitars and Windham Hill.

== Reception ==
Professional ratings
Review scores
Source	Rating
AllMusic	3.5/5 stars
Encyclopedia of Popular Music	3/5 stars

Writing for AllMusic, music critic Hal Horowitz wrote of the album "... music that falls between folk, world, jazz, gospel, and the dreaded new age that is indelibly tied to Kottke's recognizable percussive style. There are few deviations from his established direction and many of these tracks could have been included on any of his previous two-dozen or so discs. But that doesn't lessen the impact of experiencing one of the most respected and intense acoustic guitarists in the history of the instrument ply his craft... Established fans won't find many revelations here, but they will still relish hearing fresh Kottke music, if only because he's obviously still playing at the top of his game 35 years into his idiosyncratic career." Rolling Stone gave the album 3 of 5 stars.

== Track listing ==
All songs by Leo Kottke except as noted.

1. "Monopoly" – 5:34
2. "Stolen" – 2:14
3. "Mockingbird Hill" (Horton Vaughn) – 1:52
4. "Then" – 5:04
5. "Mora Roa" – 6:15
6. "Axolotl" – 3:55
7. "The Bristol Sloth" – 3:55
8. "Unbar" – 4:30
9. "Jesus Maria" (Carla Bley) – 3:13
10. "Gewerbegebiet" – 5:15
11. "Banks of Marble" (Les Rice) – 3:28

== Personnel ==
- Leo Kottke - 6 & 12-string guitar, vocals
- Los Lobos appears on "Banks of Marble"

Production notes:

- Produced by Leo Kottke and Steve Berlin
- Engineered by Sam Hudson, Paul duGre ("Banks of Marble")
- Mastered by Paul duGre and Brad Palm
