= Regards from Chuck Pink =

Studio album by Leo Kottke
- Released: 1988
- Recorded: MGM Sound Stage, Culver City, CA
- Genre: Folk
- Length: 43:13
- Label: Private Music (2025-2-P)
- Producer: Buell Neidlinger

Leo Kottke chronology
A Shout Toward Noon (1986)	Regards from Chuck Pink (1988)	My Father's Face (1989)

Regards from Chuck Pink is an album by American guitarist Leo Kottke, released in 1988.

The song "Busy Signal" is the only song by Leo Kottke nominated for a Grammy award. He did receive another nomination for his soundtrack when "The Paul Bunyan Story", narrated by Jonathan Winters, was nominated.

== Reception ==
Professional ratings
Review scores
Source	Rating
AllMusic	4/5 stars
Encyclopedia of Popular Music	4/5 stars

Writing for AllMusic, music critic Jim Esch wrote of the album "As a whole, the vibe is somewhat lighter in touch, leaning toward jazz and new age shadings with splashes of synth guitar, violin, and electronic woodwinds for accompaniment... Although Chuck Pink doesn't have the fire in the belly of his earlier work, Kottke hasn't lost his feel for a catchy rhythmic groove and his interpretive reach has grown over the years."

== Track listing ==
1. "I Yell at Traffic" – 3:14
2. "Foster's Feet" – 4:01
3. "Dan's Tune" – 3:19
4. "Skinflint" – 2:42
5. "Pink Christmas" – 3:00
6. "Short Wave" – 2:45
7. "Dog Quiver" – 3:36
8. "Busy Signal" – 3:52
9. "Theme from 'Doodles'" – 2:15
10. "The Late Zone" – 4:14
11. "Taxco Steps" – 3:14
12. "Ojo" – 3:44
13. "Mary" – 3:17

All songs by Leo Kottke

== Personnel ==
- Leo Kottke - acoustic guitar, electric guitar, synth guitar
- George Doering - electric guitar, synth guitar
- Ralph Morrison - violin, string arrangements
- Brenton Banks - violin
- Evan Wilson - viola
- Buell Neidlinger - cello, Fender bass, acoustic bass, string arrangements
- Peter Erskine - drums, percussion, synth drums, synth program
- Jim Keltner - drums, percussion, synth drums, synth program
- Marty Krystall - electronic woodwind instrument

== Production notes ==
- Produced by Buell Neidlinger
- Engineered by Dan Wallin and Sue McLean
- Mastered by Stephen Marcussen
- Photography by Tom Berthiaume
