= John Van Hamersveld =

American graphic artist and illustrator (born 1941)

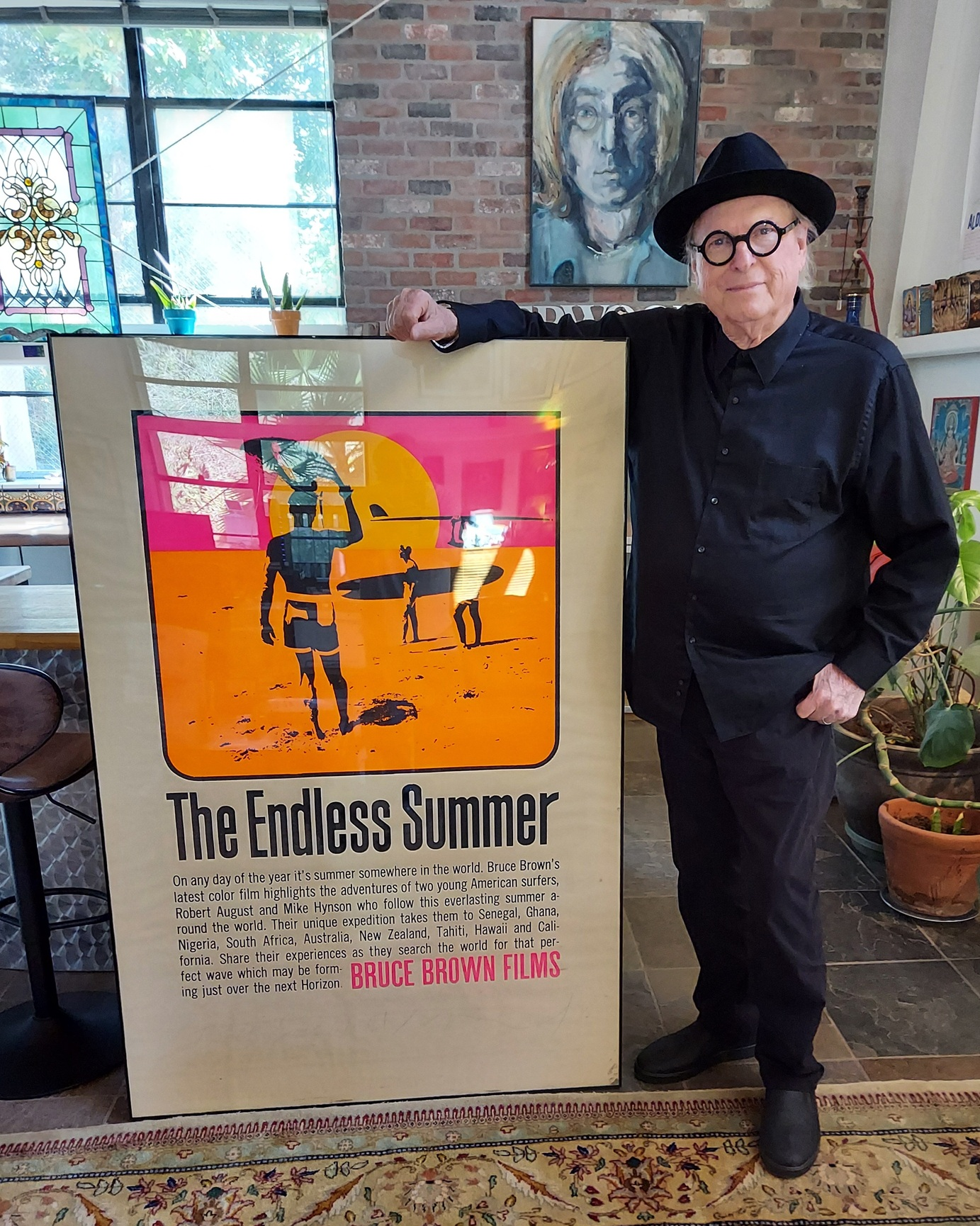
- Van Hamersveld with an original poster for The Endless Summer
- Born: 1941 (age 84–85); Baltimore, Maryland, United States
- Occupation: Graphic artist
- Known for: Iconic Posters and Album Covers
- Spouse: Alida Post

John Van Hamersveld (born September 1, 1941 in Baltimore, Maryland) is an American graphic artist and illustrator who designed record jackets for pop and psychedelic bands from the 1960s onward. Among 300 albums on which he worked are the covers of Magical Mystery Tour by the Beatles, Crown of Creation by Jefferson Airplane, Exile on Main Street by the Rolling Stones, and Hotter Than Hell by Kiss. Van Hamersveld's first major assignment in 1963, was designing the poster for the surf film The Endless Summer, after which he served as Capitol Records' head of design from 1965 to 1968. During that time, he worked on the artwork for albums by Capitol artists including the Beatles and the Beach Boys. He also oversaw the design of the psychedelic posters for the Pinnacle Shrine exposition.

== Endless Summer ==
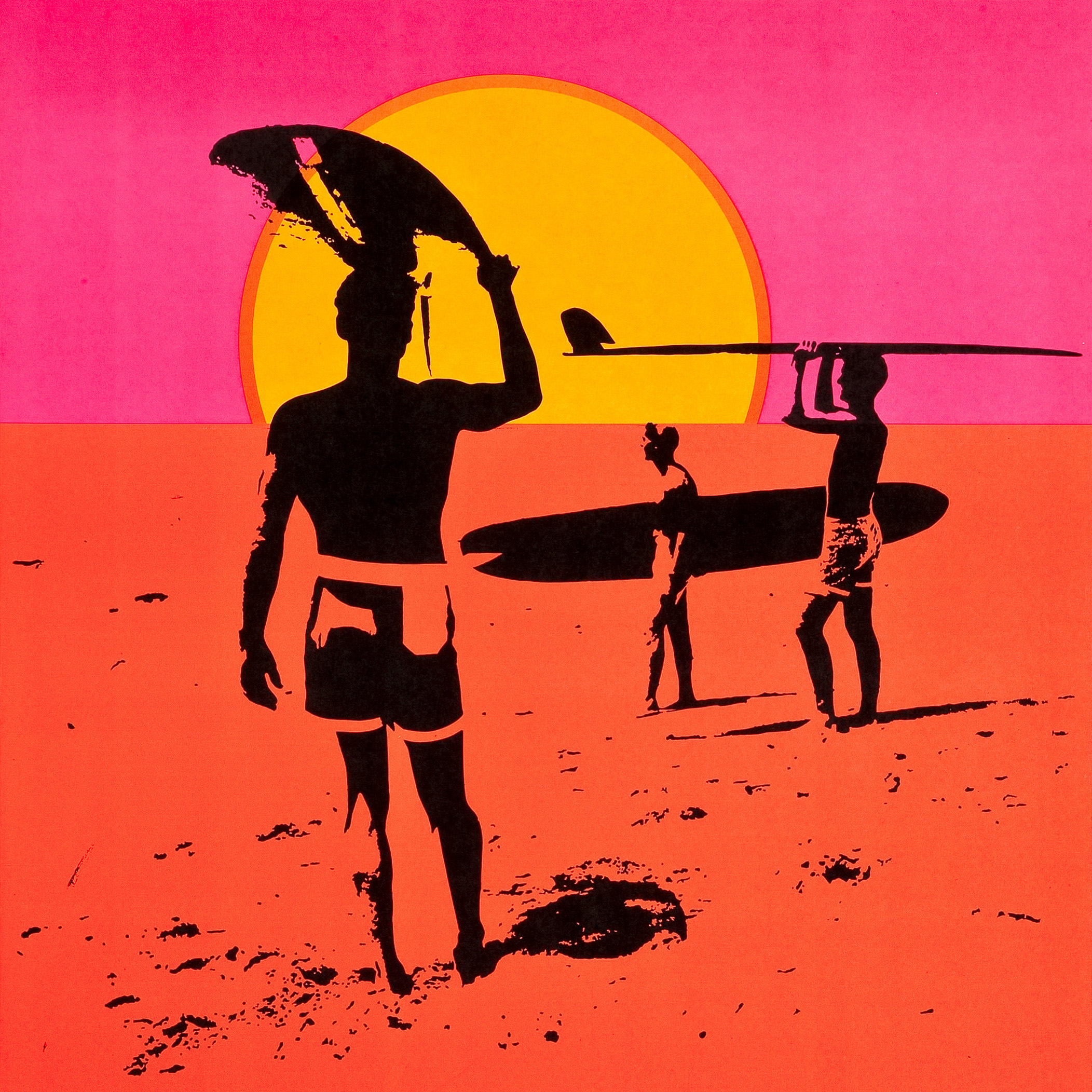
The Endless Summer by Van Hamersveld

In 1964, Van Hamersveld was a student at the Art Center College of Design and the art director of Surfing Illustrated magazine and Surfer magazine. Van Hamersveld was also a local surfer and was hired by director and filmmaker Bruce Brown to design the iconic Endless Summer movie poster using a photograph taken by Bob Bagley, general manager and cameraman for Bruce Brown Films. To produce the image that would become iconic, he organized a photo session with the producer and the two stars at Salt Creek Beach in Dana Point, California. Using photo techniques for the central image and hand-lettering the title Van Hamersveld created a "national phenomenon" image which has endured as a classic. He was paid $150 for the art. The poster is featured in the National Museum of American History section of the Smithsonian Institution, the Museum of Modern Art, and the Los Angeles County Museum of Art.

The Smithsonian noted, "The poster’s premise was Brown's but Van Hamersveld took Bob Bagley’s image of the movie’s stars Mike Hynson and Robert August and Brown and transformed it into a 1960s neon masterpiece of the LA modernist poster, having been an Art Center College of Design student".

== Other work ==
He designed an official poster and 360-foot-long mural for the 1984 Los Angeles Olympic Games; illustrations for Esquire, Rolling Stone, Billboard; and branding and logos for Fatburger, Contempo Casuals, and Broadway Deli. In 1997, Van Hamersveld began his own line of products revisiting his work from 1964 to 1974, which he calls "Post-Future". With the printmaking of a fine art edition of the Endless Summer poster, he moved his design work into his Coolhous studio in Santa Monica and between analog and digital environments managed to create works such as the posters for the 2005 Cream reunion concert at the Royal Albert Hall in London.

In 2013, Van Hamersveld celebrated 50 years in graphic design by producing a vinyl EP sleeve for Liverpool-based blues-rockers Sankofa, in addition to publishing the book John Van Hamersveld—Coolhaus Studio: 50 Years of Graphic Design. He continued his line of work in 2014 with two more artworks for records by Asher Roth and the Gaslight Anthem. In April 2018, Van Hamersveld completed a mural on a storage tank near Grand Avenue in El Segundo, California. "El Segundo is where my career started, as a surfer and an artist," he told the Los Angeles Times.

== Album covers ==
Among his album covers are:

- Magical Mystery Tour - Beatles - 1967
- Vincebus Eruptum - Blue Cheer - 1968
- Crown of Creation - Jefferson Airplane - 1968
- The Travel Agency - The Travel Agency - 1968
- Turn Around, Look At Me - The Vogues - 1968
- The West Coast Pop Art Experimental Band - Vol. 2 - 1968
- The West Coast Pop Art Experimental Band - Vol. 3 - 1968
- Catch - Catch - 1969
- Extremely Heavy! - The Underground All-Stars - 1969
- Overdub - Womb - 1969
- Be a Brother - Big Brother And The Holding Co. - 1970
- Vol. II - Liz Damon's Orient Express - 1970
- Silverbird - Mark Lindsay - 1970
- The Ventures - The Ventures - 1970
- Truk Tracks - Truk - 1970
- Beans - Beans - 1971
- Come Back Home - Bobby Goldsboro - 1971
- Communication - Bobby Womack - 1971
- Beast of the Bonzos - Bonzo Dog Band - 1971
- What You Hear Is What You Get - Live At Carnegie Hall - Ike & Tina Turner - 1971
- Black Pearl - Jimmy McGriff - 1971
- Mudlark - Leo Kottke - 1971
- Long John's Blues - Long John Baldry And The Hoochie Coochie Men - 1971
- We're All Going Down Together - Michael Jarrett - 1971
- Comin' On Home - Richard Groove Holmes - 1971
- Theme From Shaft - The Ventures - 1971
- Hot Platters - Various - 1971
- Lo & Behold - Coulson, Dean, McGuinness, Flint* - 1972
- Superpak - George Jones - 1972
- Live At The Lighthouse - Grant Green - 1972
- Less Than The Song - Hoyt Axton - 1972
- Out The Window - Jim Pulte - 1972
- I, Capricorn - Shirley Bassey - 1972
- Exile On Main St - The Rolling Stones - 1972
- Joy - The Ventures - 1972
- Rock And Roll Forever - The Ventures - 1972
- Introspection - Thijs Van Leer - 1972
- Tarot - Touchstone - 1972
- The Best Of Vikki Carr - Vikki Carr - 1972
- Pat Garrett & Billy The Kid - Original Soundtrack Recording - Bob Dylan - 1973
- 2000 And Thirteen - Carl Reiner & Mel Brooks - 1973
- Phew! - Claudia Lennear - 1973
- High Life - Frankie Miller - 1973
- Gemini Suite - Jon Lord / London Symphony Orchestra - 1973
- Live - Lee Michaels - 1973
- My Feet Are Smiling - Leo Kottke - 1973
- The Red Back Book - Scott Joplin, The New England Conservatory Ragtime Ensemble Conducted By Gunther Schuller - 1973
- The Joker - Steve Miller Band - 1973
- T.B. Sheets - Van Morrison - 1973
- The Best Of Willie Nelson - Willie Nelson - 1973
- All Around Us - A Foot In Coldwater - 1974
- +'Justments - Bill Withers - 1974
- The Best Of The Grateful Dead: Skeletons From The Closet - Grateful Dead - 1974
- Joey Stec - Joey Stec - 1974
- Here's Johnny.... Magic Moments From The Tonight Show - Johnny Carson - 1974
- Hotter Than Hell - Kiss - 1974
- Dreams And All That Stuff - Leo Kottke - 1974
- Ice Water - Leo Kottke - 1974
- Lane Changer - Michael Fennelly - 1974
- Differently - Ralph Graham - 1974
- Peace on You - Roger McGuinn - 1974
- Small Talk - Sly & The Family Stone - 1974
- I've Got Time - Allan Clarke - 1976
- Stretchin' Out In Bootsy's Rubber Band - Bootsy's Rubber Band - 1976
- We've Got A Live One Here! - Commander Cody & His Lost Planet Airmen - 1976
- Rock 'N' Country - Freddy Fender - 1976
- 1971 - 1976 Did You Hear Me? - Leo Kottke - 1976
- Leo Kottke - Leo Kottke - 1976
- Love Potion - New Birth - 1976
- Waking And Dreaming - Orleans - 1976
- Taught By Experts - Peter Allen - 1976
- Fly Like An Eagle - Steve Miller Band - 1976
- Motown Disc - Tech #3 - Various - 1976
- Welcome To L.A. - Various - 1976
- Sweet Forgiveness - Bonnie Raitt - 1977
- Dragon - Dragon - 1977
- No Accident - Driver - 1977
- Feel The Fire - Jermaine Jackson - 1977
- White Room - Jimmy Ponder - 1977
- Carnival - John Handy - 1977
- Sammy Johns Sings The Van / Original Motion Picture Sound Track - Sammy Johns - 1977
- New Conversations - Bill Evans - 1978
- An American Prayer - Jim Morrison Music By The Doors - 1978
- Burnt Lips - Leo Kottke - 1978
- Between The Hard Place & The Ground - Michael Bloomfield - 1978
- Rock Rose - Rock Rose - 1978
- Greatest Hits 1974 - 1978 - Steve Miller Band - 1978
- Eat To The Beat - Blondie - 1979
- John Fahey Visits Washington D.C. - John Fahey - 1979
- Slug Line - John Hiatt - 1979
- Balance - Leo Kottke - 1979
- Girls Go Wild - The Fabulous Thunderbirds - 1979
- Autoamerican - Blondie - 1980
- Mississippi Blues - Bukka White - 1980
- Reads His Poetry - Charles Bukowski - 1980
- Rock Therapy - Colin Winski - 1980
- Hell of a Spell - Doug Sahm - 1980
- Blues Stay Away From Me - Frank Wakefield - 1980
- Welcome To The Club (Live) - Ian Hunter - 1980
- Two Bit Monsters - John Hiatt - 1980
- Greatest Hits - KC & The Sunshine Band - 1980
- Unspoken Intentions - Michael Gulezian - 1980
- Ozark Mountain Daredevils - Ozark Mountain Daredevils - 1980
- Flash Gordon (Original Soundtrack Music) - Queen - 1980
- Louisiana Blues - Robert Pete Williams - 1980
- Ron Cuccia And The Jazz Poetry Group - Ron Cuccia & The Jazz Poetry Group - 1980
- The Best Of The Sir Douglas Quintet - Sir Douglas Quintet - 1980
- Truth Decay - T-Bone Burnett - 1980
- On The Edge - The Babys - 1980
- Love's Melodies - The Searchers - 1980
- Rare Blues (The Takoma Blues Series) - Various - 1980
- The Last Stroll - Walter Egan - 1980
- One Man Band - Dr. Ross* - 1981
- The 1976 Solo Keyboard Album - George Duke - 1981
- Live in Tasmania - John Fahey - 1981
- Guitar Music - Leo Kottke - 1981
- Cruisin' for a Bruisin' - Michael Bloomfield - 1981
- Border Wave - Sir Douglas Quintet - 1981
- Butt Rockin' - The Fabulous Thunderbirds - 1981
- The Roulettes - The Roulettes - 1981
- Chicago Breakdown - Various - 1981
- Hit 45's Of The 70's, Vol. I - Various - 1981
- Hit 45's Of The 70's, Vol. II - Various - 1981
- American Fool - John Cougar - 1982
- Beacon - The Cornelius Bumpus Quartet - 1982
- The Sir Douglas Quintet Live - The Sir Douglas Quintet* - 1983
- Rare Blues - Various - 1983
- Signs Of Life - Billy Squier - 1984
- This Is What You Want... This Is What You Get - Public Image Ltd. - 1984
- E S P - Espionage - 1985
- Passion - Robin Trower - 1986
- The Best Of - Sir Douglas Quintet - 1986
- Make Me Sweat - Savoy Brown - 1988
- All Day Thumbsucker Revisited - The History Of Blue Thumb Records -Various - 1988
- Get It On! - The Fraternity Of Man - 1995
- The Mad, Mad, Mad, Mad, Mad Lads (CD, Album, RE, Pap) - The Mad Lads - 1995
- Theme From Shaft / The Horse (CD, Comp) - The Ventures - 1995
- Cold Cuts - Nicholas Greenwood* - 2004
- Royal Albert Hall - London May 2, 3, 5, 6, 2005 - Cream - 2005
- The Collection - Sly And The Family Stone - 2005
- Chapter Two - HE3 Project - 2010
- Hard Work / Carnival - John Handy - 2010
- Exile On Main St (Rarities Edition) - The Rolling Stones - 2010
- Live In Vancouver 1970 -The Doors - 2010
- The Complete Album Collection Vol. One - Bob Dylan - 2012
- Get Hurt - The Gaslight Anthem - 2014
- Studio Albums Vinyl Collection 1971 - 2016 - The Rolling Stones - 2016
