= Fat Guy Goes Nutzoid =

- VHS cover for Fat Guy Goes Nutzoid!!
- Directed by: John Golden
- Written by: John Golden; Roger Golden
- Produced by: Emily Dillon
- Starring: Mark Alfred; Joan Allen; Tibor Feldman; Peter Linari
- Cinematography: John Drake
- Edited by: Jeffrey Wolf
- Music by: Leo Kottke
- Production company: Golden Boy Productions
- Distributed by: Troma Entertainment
- Release date: September 1986
- Country: United States
- Language: English

Fat Guy Goes Nutzoid is a 1986 film produced by Golden Boys Productions.

== Production ==
Fat Guy Goes Nutzoid was shot in 1983 under the title Zeisters.

== Release ==
Fat Guy Goes Nutzoid was distributed in September 1986 by Troma.

== Reception ==
A reviewer credited as "Lor." of Variety reviewed the film on April 11, 1987. "Lor." described the film as a "tasteless effort" noting that it looked like a backyard home movie and that it contained "cheap, vulgar gags", concluding the film was a "dud".
