= That's What =

Studio album by Leo Kottke
- Released: 1990
- Studios: Mike Jones Film Corp., Minneapolis, MN
- Genres: Folk, jazz
- Length: 37:34
- Label: Private (2068-2-P)
- Producers: Willard O. Peterson, Leo Kottke

Leo Kottke chronology
My Father's Face (1989)	That's What (1990)	Great Big Boy (1991)

That's What is an album by the American steel-string guitar artist Leo Kottke. It is distinctive in its jazzy nature and "talking" songs ("Buzzby" and "Husbandry"). It reached No. 24 on Billboard's Top New Age Albums charts, Kottke's highest charting position on Billboard.

The song "Little Snoozer" is played on a Charvel demo model of a Danelectro 6-string bass guitar tuned one octave lower than a standard 6-string guitar. Kottke used trombones on many of the songs.

Kottke has re-recorded at least two more versions of "Jesus Maria".

== Critical reception ==
Professional ratings
Review scores
Source	Rating
AllMusic	3/5 stars
Select	3/5 medals

The Orlando Sentinel wrote that "Kottke's eccentric poetics and monotone Lou Reed-style of delivery make 'Buzzby' and 'Husbandry' the strangest moments on That's What." The Chicago Tribune deemed the album "a rumbling, comic, folksy sound, yet one that remains strangely comfortable and comforting."

AllMusic stated: "Leo Kottke has always been a highly idiosyncratic guitar player whose music is infused with his wry sense of humor. That's What is no exception, with Kottke's guitar work drawing from jazzy, blues and folk sources... Tying it all together is Kottke's fine guitar playing, as nimble and as quirky as ever."

== Track listing ==
All songs by Leo Kottke except as noted.

1. "Little Snoozer" – 3:53
2. "Buzzby" – 3:57
3. "What the Arm Said" – 2:54
4. "Creature Feature" – 4:14
5. "Oddball" – 2:51
6. "Czech Bounce" – 3:38
7. "Mid-Air" (Willard O. Peterson) – 3:23
8. "The Great One" – 3:22
9. "Husbandry" – 4:52
10. "Jesus Maria" (Carla Bley) – 4:30

== Personnel ==
- Leo Kottke – guitar
- Billy Peterson – string bass, 5-string electric bass, drums, piano, synth, Farfisa Professional
- Bruce Paulson – tenor & bass trombones
- Gordy Knudtson – percussion

Production

- Produced by Willard O. Peterson & Leo Kottke
- Engineered by Paul Martinson
- Assistant engineers: Scott Bartel & Sam Hudson
- Mastered by Doug Sax
- Arrangements by Willard O. Peterson except guitar on "Jesus Maria" arranged by Tim Sparks
