= My Father's Face =

Studio album by Leo Kottke
- Released: April 15, 1989
- Recorded: Ocean Way Recording, Los Angeles; Polar Studios, Stockholm; 74th St. Studio, Minneapolis
- Length: 39:01
- Label: Private Music (2050-2-P)
- Producer: T Bone Burnett

Leo Kottke chronology
Regards from Chuck Pink (1988)	My Father's Face (1989)	That's What (1990)

Professional ratings
Review scores
Source	Rating
AllMusic	3/5 stars
The Encyclopedia of Popular Music	3/5 stars

My Father's Face is an album recorded by American guitarist Leo Kottke, released in 1989. It is his second with producer T Bone Burnett.

The same year as the release of My Father's Face Kottke would be featured in a PBS feature, Home and Away.

== Track listing ==
1. "Times Twelve" – 3:32
2. "Everybody Lies" – 2:47
3. "B. J." – 3:29
4. "Why Can't You Fix My Car" – 2:27
5. "Theme from Rick and Bob Report" –2:30
6. "My Aunt Francis" 4:36
7. "William Powell" – 4:57
8. "Back in Buffalo" – 3:03
9. "Mona Ray" – 2:22
10. "Jack Gets Up" – 4:19
11. "Doorbell" – 4:59

All songs by Leo Kottke

== Personnel ==
- Leo Kottke - guitar, vocals
- David Hidalgo - Fender six, eight string, harmony vocals
- Jim Keltner - drums, percussion on "Back in Buffalo" and "The Rick and Bob Report"
- T Bone Burnett - Fender 12, Hammond B-3
- David Miner - four and five string electric bass
- Edgar Meyer - acoustic bass
- Michael Blair - marimba, glockenspiel, Fairchild, tympani, hand drum, shakers, tubular bells, etc.
- Jerry Douglas - dobro
- Charlie Shoemake - vibraphone

== Production notes ==
- Produced by T Bone Burnett
- Recorded and mixed by Rik Pekkonen
- Assistant engineer: Stacy Baird
- Additional recording by Paul Martinson
