= Billy Peterson =

American musician

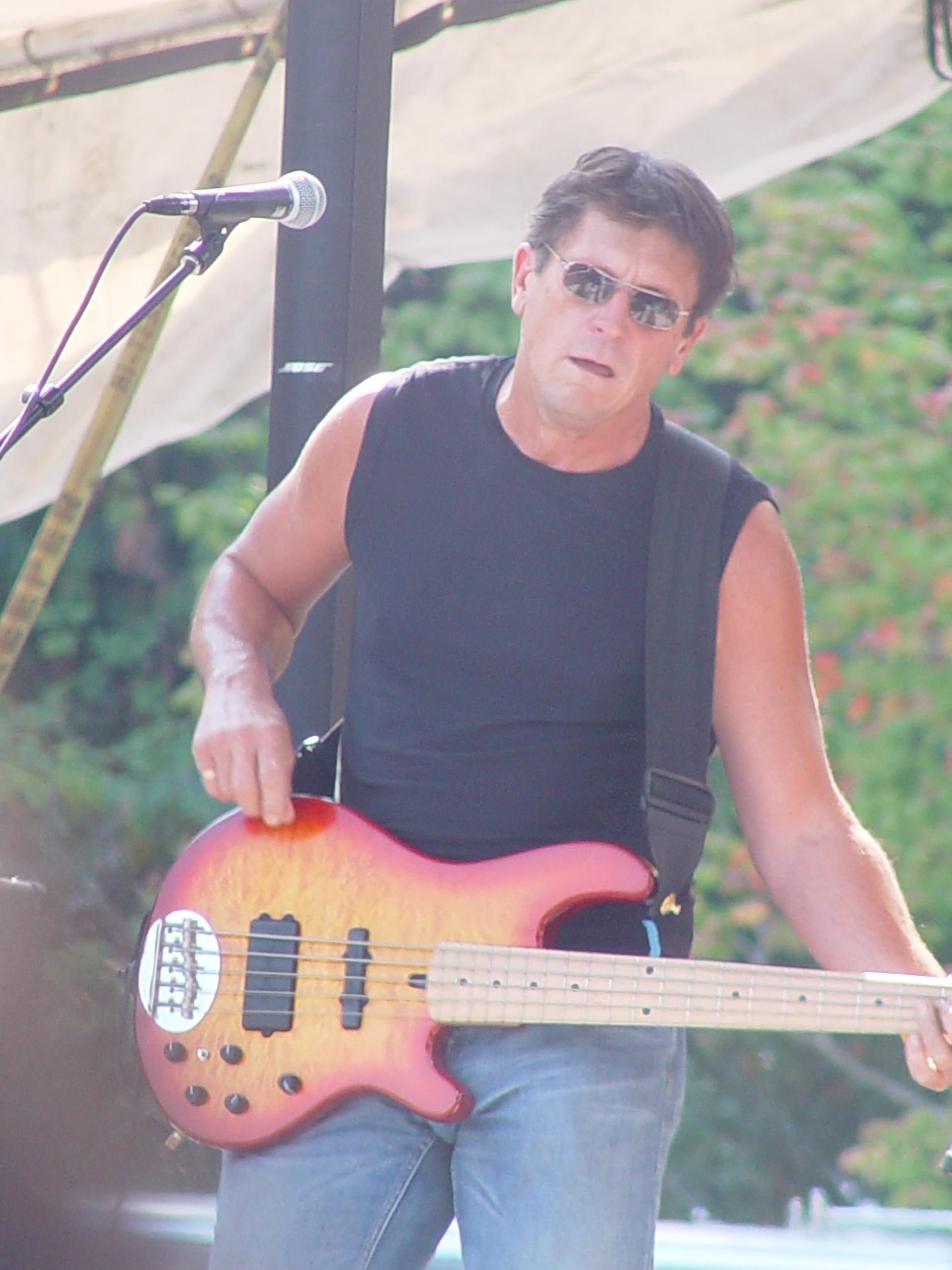
- Peterson with Steve Miller Band in 2006

Background information
- Born: Willard Peterson; Minnesota, United States
- Genres: Rock; pop; jazz; R&B; country
- Occupations: Bassist; session musician; songwriter; composer; producer
- Instrument: Bass
- Years active: 1967–present
- Website: Petersonbilly.com

Billy Peterson (born Willard Peterson in Minnesota) is an American bass player, songwriter, composer, session musician and producer. Peterson, who grew up in a family of professional musicians, became involved with music at a very young age. Billy is the brother of Paul Peterson (bass guitarist/singer/songwriter/keyboardist) and Ricky Peterson (keyboardist/singer/song writer/producer).

== Career ==
=== Early career ===
In 1967, Peterson joined The Righteous Brothers on a summer tour. While in school, he played bass and drums in local orchestras, big bands, and R&B bands, and toured with the Lawrence Welk Show All Stars. After graduating high school, he played bass with trumpet legend Clifford Brown's pianist Billy Wallace until 1973. Peterson was the bassist on three of folk guitarist Leo Kottke's albums in the mid '70s, and played electric and upright bass on Bob Dylan's multi-platinum Blood On The Tracks for Columbia Records.

Peterson joined the Gibson guitar staff in 1976, giving him the opportunity to perform with B.B. King, Johnny Smith, Lenny Breau, Les Paul, and Howard Roberts. During this decade, record producer and engineer David Rivkin (aka David Z, who produced Prince in the 1980s) introduced Peterson to keyboardist Ben Sidran, the beginning of a musical partnership that is still going strong.

Peterson released his first solo album, “Threshold of Surrender,” in 1981. While touring the US and Europe with various artists, he recorded many albums as well as national radio and TV commercials. These included Peterson in a wide range of roles, from playing solo bass to accompanying a full symphony orchestra.

=== With the Steve Miller Band ===
In 1986, Ben Sidran produced an album for Steve Miller and hired Peterson to play bass on Miller's debut solo album, Born 2 B Blue (Capitol). Afterwards, Peterson joined the Steve Miller Band and was a member for 23 years. He started to tour with the band in spring 1987; besides Born 2 B Blue, Peterson played bass on the Steve Miller Band Box Set (Capitol) and Wide River (Polydor) recordings, among many others.

=== With Prince and other artists ===
When possible, Peterson continued touring Europe and Japan with Ben Sidran and worked on numerous recordings for other artists, including Georgie Fame and Phil Upchurch. In 1990, Peterson played on, produced and arranged Leo Kottke's album That's What for which he wrote the song “Mid Air.” Shortly afterwards, The Artist (also known as Prince) approached him to create a string arrangement for The New Power Generation's dynamo maven, Rosie Gaines.

Peterson re-harmonized Bryan Adams's hit, "(Everything I Do) I Do It for You", and was musical director and bass player for Legends Rock (2004), a three-part television concert series and documentary shot in the south of France and produced by Megabien Entertainment.

=== 2010 to present ===
Peterson continues to work with various artists around the world. In 2012, he went on a European tour with longtime colleague Ben Sidran. Later that year, he and Cynthia Johnson co-hosted the Funkytown Movie (Megabien Entertainment), which showcases some of the finest artists and musicians in Minnesota's Twin Cities (Minneapolis and St. Paul).

In 2015, Peterson received a Grammy Hall of Fame Award for his participation in Bob Dylan's Blood on the Tracks. The album was inducted into the Hall of Fame for its musical, social, and cultural significance.

== Awards ==
- 2015 - Grammy Hall of Fame Award – Induction of Bob Dylan's album Blood on the Tracks, with Peterson on bass
- 2008 - Mid-American Music Hall of Fame – Induction Award as a member of “The Peterson Family”
- 2007 - Ancient City Blues Society – Honorary Lifetime Membership
- 2005 - Minneapolis City Pages - Best Jazz Artist 2005
- 1989 - Minnesota Music Award – Best Jazz Bass
- 1988 - Minnesota Music Award – Best Jazz/Fusion Bass Player
- 1987 - Minnesota Jazz Music Awards – Special Recognition Award
- 1985 - Minnesota Music Award – Jazz-Modern/Mainstream Instrumentalist
- 1984 - Minnesota Music Award – Best Jazz Instrumentalist
- 1984 - Minnesota Music Award – Best Bass
- 1982 - Minnesota Music Award – Best Jazz Instrumentalist
- 1975 - Grammy Award - Bob Dylan's album Blood on the Tracks, with Peterson on bass, awarded for Best Album Notes.
  (The album went Double Platinum in the US, Platinum in Canada, and Gold in the UK, among others.)

== Discography ==
- Bob Rockwell: Androids (1974)
- Leo Kottke: Dreams and All That Stuff (1974)
- Leo Kottke: Ice Water (1974)
- Bob Dylan: Blood on the Tracks (1975)
- Art Resnick: Jungleopolis (1975)
- Leo Kottke: Chewing Pine (1975)
- Mark Gaddis: Carousel Man (1976)
- Steve Miller Band: Fly Like an Eagle (1977)
- Dick Pinney: Devil Take My Shiny Coins (1977)
- Michael Johnson: Ain't Dis Da Life (1977)
- Jim Post: I Love My Life (1978)
- Ben Sidran: On the Cool Side (1985)
- Ben Sidran: On the Live Side (1986)
- Prudence Johnson: Vocals (1987)
- Claudia Schmidt: Big Earful (1987)
- Steve Miller: Born 2B Blue (1988) (Capitol)
- Ben Sidran: Too Hot to Touch (1988)
- Bill Goodwin/Hal Galper: No Method (1989)
- Leo Kottke: That's What (1990)
- Ricky Peterson: Smile Blue (1991)
- Ben Sidran: Cool Paradise (1991)
- Larry Long: Troubadour (1992)
- Steve Miller Band: Wide River (1993) (Polydor)
- Steve Miller Band: Steve Miller Band [Box Set] (1994) (Capitol)
- Neal Schon: Beyond the Thunder (1995)
- Larry Long: Living in a Rich Man's World (1995)
- Neal & Leandra: Old Love (1995)
- Phil Upchurch: Whatever Happened to the Blues (1997)
- Larry Long: Run for Freedom, Sweet Thunder (1997)
- Various Artists: Jazz Christmas (1998)
- The CCM Jazz Ensemble: Lady Bird (1998)
- Jeanne Arland Peterson: Timeless (1999)
- Bob Rockwell: After Hours (1999)
- Bob Malach: After Hours (1999)
- David Hazeltine: After Hours, Vol. 2 (1999)
- Bill Carrothers: After Hours, Vol. 4 (1999)
- Ricky Peterson: Souvenir (1999)
- Irv Williams: Stop, Look, and Listen (2001)
- Leo Kottke: Ice Water (2000)
- Larry Long: Well May the World Go (producer only, 2000)
- Ira Sullivan: After Hours (2001)
- Various Artists: If I Had a Song: The Songs of Pete (2001)
- Clementine Cafe: Apres-midi (2001)
- Various Artists: Go Jazz All Stars: Live in Japan (2001)
- Irv Williams: Encore (2001)
- Lee Konitz: After Hours, Vol. 7 (2002)
- Tony Hymas: Hope Street MN (2002);
- David Aaron Thomas: Wingin' It (2003)
- Leo Kottke: Best of the Capitol Years (2003)
- Ben Sidran/Bob Rockwell: Walk Pretty (2003)
- Ben Sidran: Anthology (2003)
- The Peterson Family: A compilation (2003)
- Irv Williams: That's All (2004)
- Ben Sidran: Nick's Bump (2004)
- Leo Sidran: BOhemia (2004)
- Bob Dylan: The Collection, Vol. 3: Blonde on Blonde/Blood on the Tracks/Infidels (2005)
- Moodfood: Ice (2005)
- Les Paul: American Made World Played (2005)
- Irv Williams: Dedicated to You (2005)
- Soulfood: Power Yoga (2006)
- Soulfood: Buddha Chill (2008)
- Soulfood: Zen Lounge (2009)
- Oleta Adams: Let's Stay Here (2009)
- Steve Miller Band: Bingo! (2010)
- Steve Miller Band: Let Your Hair Down (2011)
- Irv Williams: Duke's Mixture (2011)
- Claudia Schmidt: Bend in the River - Collected Songs (2012)
- Dave King with Bill Carrothers and Billy Peterson: I've Been Ringing You (2012)
- Steve Miller Band: Young Hearts - Complete Greatest Hits (2013)
- Irv Williams: Then Was Then, Now Is Now (2014)
- Peg Carrothers: Edges of My Mind (2014)
- Ben Sidran: Blue Camus (2015)
- Irv Williams Trio: Pinnacle (2015)
- Billy Peterson and David Hazeltine: Next Door (2016)
- The Peterson Family: Legacy (2017)

For references, see allmusic or cduniverse.com.

== Filmography ==
- Legends Rock, live TV show (2004)
- Steve Miller Band: Live from Chicago, video documentary (2008)
- The Funkytown Movie, music documentary (2012)
