= One Way Records =

- Parent company: Alliance Entertainment
- Founded: 1971
- Founder: David Schlang
- Defunct: 2000s
- Status: Inactive
- Genre: Various
- Country of origin: U.S.
- Location: Albany, New York

One Way Records was an independent record label based in Albany, New York that specialized in budget reissues of classic rock albums. In the 1990s, it gained business pressing reissues of those records that had "fallen through the cracks" in the transition in the music industry from vinyl to compact discs. Other labels that similarly filled this reissue niche were Collector's Pipeline, Rhino Records and Razor & Tie.

It was part of a company that served as rack jobber and music distributor for budget titles and cutouts. The company was founded by David Schlang in 1971, who was president until 1995 and again from 1999.

In 1995 it was sold to Alliance Entertainment, for $18.5 million; at that point the company had annual revenues of just over $35 million, of which the label accounted for 15%.

In 1994, Terry Wachsmuth, the Artist and Repertoire Director, predicted "Sooner or later it's going to peter out, but we expect to be doing this for another 5-10 years at least." The label closed in the early 2000s.
