= Bill Berg (musician) =

American drummer

- Origin: Hibbing, Minnesota, U.S.
- Genres: Jazz fusion, jazz
- Instrument: drums

Bill Berg is an American jazz and fusion drummer known for his work with the group Flim & the BB's, as well as with guitarist Wayne Johnson.

== Early life ==
Berg is a native of Hibbing, Minnesota.

== Career ==
Berg worked as the drummer on the Bob Dylan album Blood on the Tracks. Berg has also worked with Leo Kottke, Gary Brunotte, Bill Perkins, and others. He has also worked with the Marc Yaxley Trio, a local jazz band in Transylvania County, North Carolina.

== Personal life ==
Berg lives in Brevard, North Carolina, and frequently performs in the Asheville metropolitan area.
