= Denny Bruce =

American record producer

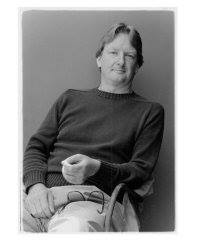
- Born: 1944 (age 81–82); Lancaster, Pennsylvania, United States
- Known for: Music Producer and Artist Manager

Denny Bruce (born in 1944 in Lancaster, Pennsylvania) is an American record producer and artist manager. He produced over 60 albums, and managed and produced albums by John Fahey, The Fabulous Thunderbirds, Leo Kottke, John Hiatt and many others over his 50 year career in the music business.

== Biography ==
While living in Los Angeles in 1965, Bruce was hired by Frank Zappa as a second drummer with The Mothers of Invention. After six months, he contracted mononucleosis and was forced to leave the group. He was replaced by Billy Mundi.

Bruce launched a career in artist management and record production with his first artist signed, Lisa Kindred, and soon added Magic Sam, Albert Collins and Earl Hooker. He later became A&R consultant to Blue Thumb Records, working with such artists as Ike and Tina Turner, Charlie Musselwhite, and Robbie Basho.

After the death of Magic Sam in 1969, Bruce worked as Tour Manager of Buffy Sainte-Marie. He formed a production company with Jack Nitzsche and songwriter Gerry Goffin. They worked out of Goffin's new Larabee Studios in West Hollywood.

While working for Vanguard Records he started producing John Fahey and through Fahey and his label, Takoma Records, he began his management and producer's relationship with Leo Kottke. He produced all seven albums for Kottke on Capitol Records.

He later teamed up with Chrysalis Records in 1979 to purchase Fahey's Takoma Records. Bruce brought Jon Monday into the company to continue as General Manager. Monday had been with Takoma since 1970, and was their first full-time employee. Bruce signed and produced The Fabulous Thunderbirds, and signed T-Bone Burnett, Charles Bukowski, and other notable artists to the new Takoma label.

In 1984, he managed 'The Blasters' who released the album Hard Line on Slash/Warner Bros., as well as 'The Gun Club'.

He served as pop music consultant to UCLA's Department of Fine Arts as well as at the Austin Performing Arts Center in Austin, Texas.

In 2000, Bruce and Bill Coben launched Benchmark Recordings with the original four The Fabulous Thunderbirds albums and a live album by Mike Bloomfield. In 2008, Bruce retired as president and the company brought in long-time friend of the founders, Jon Monday, to run the label. The company is now co-owned by Bill Coben and Jon Monday.

== Credits ==
- 1968 - Playback, Appletree Theatre / The Appletree Theatre, Percussion
- 1968 - Head, The Monkees, Percussion
- 1969 - Further on Up the Road, Shakey Jake Harris, Percussion
- 1970 - Bad Rice, Ron Nagle, Memorabilia, Photo Courtesy
- 1971 - Mudlark, Leo Kottke, Producer, Composer
- 1972 - Of Rivers & Religion, John Fahey, Producer
- 1972 - Greenhouse, Leo Kottke, Producer
- 1972 - Artist Proof, Chris Darrow, Producer
- 1973 - My Feet Are Smiling, Leo Kottke, Producer, Composer
- 1973 - After the Ball, John Fahey, Producer
- 1974 - Ice Water, Leo Kottke, Producer
- 1974 - Dreams and All That Stuff, Leo Kottke, Producer
- 1975 - Stranger's Bed, Michael Fennelly, Producer
- 1975 - Chewing Pine, Leo Kottke, Producer
- 1976 - Leo Kottke 1971-1976: Did You Hear Me?, Leo Kottke, Producer, Photography
- 1976 - Leo Kottke, Leo Kottke, Producer
- 1977 - I'm with You Always, Mike Bloomfield, Producer
- 1978 - Burnt Lips, Leo Kottke, Producer
- 1979 - The Fabulous Thunderbirds, The Fabulous Thunderbirds, Producer
- 1979 - Slug Line, John Hiatt, Producer
- 1980 - What's the Word, The Fabulous Thunderbirds, Producer, Liner Notes
- 1980 - Two Bit Monsters, John Hiatt, Producer
- 1980 - Truth Decay, T-Bone Burnett, Director
- 1980 - Ron Cuccia and the Jazz Poetry Group, Ron Cuccia, Producer
- 1980 - Rock Therapy, Colin Winski, Producer
- 1981 - Eye of the Storm, Max Buda / Chris Darrow, Producer
- 1981 - Butt Rockin', The Fabulous Thunderbirds, Producer, Liner Notes
- 1982 - T-Bird Rhythm, The Fabulous Thunderbirds, Liner Notes
- 1983 - Live Texas Tornado, The Sir Douglas Quintet, Producer
- 1983 - Border Wave, The Sir Douglas Quintet, Executive Producer
- 1984 - Soulful Dress, Marcia Ball, Producer
- 1984 - Forget About the Danger, The LeRoi Brothers, Producer
- 1985 - Tales of the New West, Beat Farmers, Project Assistant
- 1985 - Out of the Blue [Rykodisc], Various, Producer
- 1987 - The Best of Jerry Butler [Rhino], Jerry Butler, Liner Notes
- 1987 - The Best, Leo Kottke, Producer, Composer
- 1989 - Y'All Caught? The Ones That Got Away 1979–1985, John Hiatt, Producer
- 1989 - Poor and Famous, Beat Farmers, Executive Producer
- 1990 - Loud and Plowed and...LIVE!!, Beat Farmers, Producer
- 1990 - Alien in My Own Home, Tony Mathews, Art Direction
- 1991 - The Essential, The Fabulous Thunderbirds, Producer
- 1991 - Listen to the Band, The Monkees, Percussion
- 1991 - Jazzspeak, Various, Overdubs
- 1991 - Greetings from Kartoonistan...(We Ain't Dead Yet), Kaleidoscope, Production Coordination, Project Coordinator
- 1991 - Essential, Leo Kottke, Producer
- 1992 - Blues Masters, Vol. 4: Harmonica Classics, Various, Producer
- 1993 - Slug Line/Two Bit Monsters, John Hiatt, Producer
- 1994 - Hostage, Charles Bukowski, Producer, Editing
- 1995 - Blues Masters, Vols. 1–5, Various, Producer
- 1996 - Living a Little, Laughing a Little, John Hiatt, Producer
- 1996 - How I Learned to Stop, Various, Producer
- 1996 - Different Tacos, The Fabulous Thunderbirds, Producer
- 1996 - Cowabunga! The Surf Box, Various, Producer
- 1996 - Butt Rockin'/T-Bird Rhythm, The Fabulous Thunderbirds, Producer
- 1997 - The Best of Michael Bloomfield [Fantasy], Michael Bloomfield, Compilation Producer, Reissue Producer, Reissue Compiler
- 1997 - Takoma Eclectic Sampler, Various, Producer, Compilation Producer, Reissue Producer, Liner Notes
- 1997 - Standing in My Shoes, Leo Kottke, Composer
- 1997 - Same/What's the Word, The Fabulous Thunderbirds, Producer
- 1997 - Chicago Blues Masters, Vol. 3, Various, Percussion
- 1998 - Hallelujah! Evolution!, Dr. Stephen Baird, Producer
- 1998 - Anthology, The Monkees, Percussion
- 1999 - Unassigned Territory, David Pritchard, Executive Producer
- 1999 - Takoma Slide, Various, Producer, Compilation Producer, Liner Notes
- 1999 - Takoma Eclectic Sampler, Vol. 2, Various, Producer, Compilation Producer, Reissue Producer, Liner Notes
- 1999 - Natural Selection [Zebra], Various, Executive Producer
- 2000 - Let the Boy Jam, Nick Binkley, Producer
- 2000 - Is It Over?/They Found Me Guilty, Billy Price Keystone Rhythm Band, Producer
- 2001 - Three Piece Suite: The Reprise Recordings 1971–1974, Jack Nitzsche, Producer, Liner Notes
- 2001 - Music Box, The Monkees, Percussion
- 2001 - Greatest Hits and More, John Hiatt, Producer
- 2001 - Girls Go Wild, The Fabulous Thunderbirds, Producer
- 2001 - Anthology, John Hiatt, Producer
- 2003 - The Essential Jimmie Vaughan, Jimmie Vaughan, Producer
- 2003 - The Best of the Capitol Years, Leo Kottke, Producer
- 2003 - Tacos Deluxe, The Fabulous Thunderbirds, Producer, Liner Notes
- 2003 - Roulettes, The Roulettes, Producer
- 2004 - Of Rivers & Religion/After the Ball, John Fahey / John Fahey & His Orchestra, Producer
- 2010 - Perpendicular Worlds, Toulouse Engelhardt, Liner Notes
- 2011 - Monkeemania: The Very Best of The Monkees, The Monkees, Percussion
- 2014 - From His Head to His Heart to His Hands, Michael Bloomfield, Producer
- 2016 - The Monkees 50, The Monkees, Percussion
- 2021 - The Jimmie Vaughan Story, Jimmie Vaughan, Producer
