= Leo Kottke =

American guitarist and singer

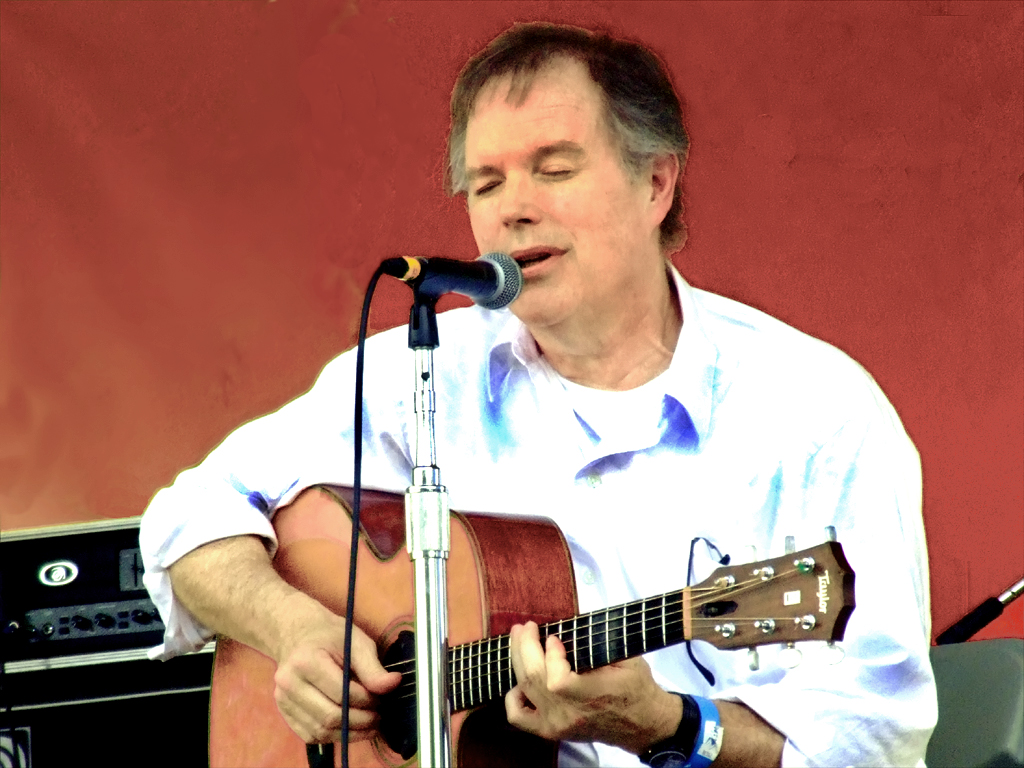
- Kottke at the Clearwater Festival, 2007

Background information
- Born: September 11, 1945 (age 81); Athens, Georgia, U.S.
- Genres: American rock, Americana, acoustic rock, American primitive guitar
- Occupation: Musician
- Instruments: Vocals, guitar
- Years active: 1966–present
- Labels: Capitol, Chrysalis, Private Music, Oblivion Records
- Website: Official website

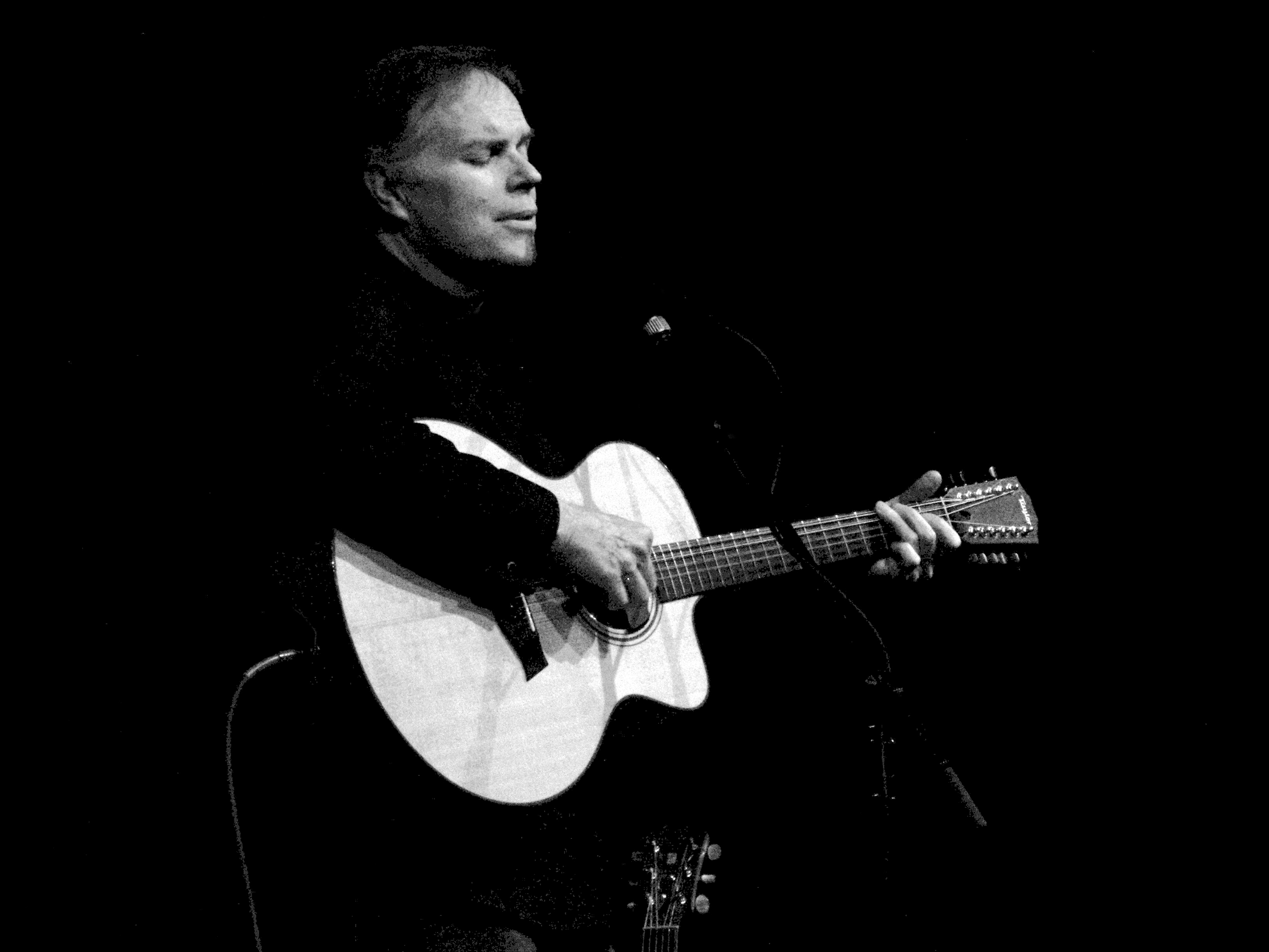
Kottke at the Herbst Theatre, San Francisco, California, January 27, 2007

Leo Kottke (born September 11, 1945) is an American acoustic guitarist. He is known for a fingerpicking style that draws on blues, jazz, and folk music, and for syncopated, polyphonic melodies. He has overcome a series of personal obstacles, including partial loss of hearing and a nearly career-ending bout with tendon damage in his right hand, to emerge as a widely recognized master of his instrument. He resides in the Minneapolis area with his family.

Focusing primarily on instrumental composition and playing, Kottke also sings sporadically, in an unconventional yet expressive baritone described by himself as sounding like "geese farts on a muggy day". In concert, Kottke intersperses humorous and often bizarre monologues with vocal and instrumental selections from throughout his career, played solo on six- and 12-string guitars.

== Biography ==
=== Early life and career ===
Kottke was born in Athens, Georgia, on September 11, 1945. He moved with his parents so frequently that he was raised in 12 different states. As a youth living in Muskogee, Oklahoma, he was influenced by folk and delta blues music, notably that of Mississippi John Hurt. Kottke learned to play trombone and violin before trying the guitar and developing his own unconventional picking style.

A mishap with a firecracker permanently damaged the hearing in his left ear, a condition that was exacerbated by exposure to loud noise during firing practice while he served in the United States Navy Reserve, when the hearing in his other ear was also damaged.

Kottke attended the University of Missouri for two semesters, where he was a member of the Delta Upsilon fraternity. He left school after his second semester. After being discharged from the Naval Reserve because of his partial loss of hearing, Kottke attended St. Cloud State College (now St. Cloud State University), in Minnesota, but left before completing his studies, choosing instead to hitchhike around the country, busking for a living, before finally settling in the Twin Cities. He arrived at the Scholar Coffeehouse in the Cedar-Riverside area of Minneapolis in the autumn of 1966, and soon was a regular performer. There, he recorded his debut album, 12-String Blues, which was released on the independent Oblivion record label in 1969. He recorded 6- and 12-String Guitar (also known as the "Armadillo album", after the animal pictured on its cover) for John Fahey's Takoma Records later the same year. It remains one of the works most closely associated with Kottke and has been re-released many times on various record labels. Fahey's manager, Denny Bruce, signed Kottke to Capitol Records, and in 1971, Capitol released Kottke's first major-label record, Mudlark.

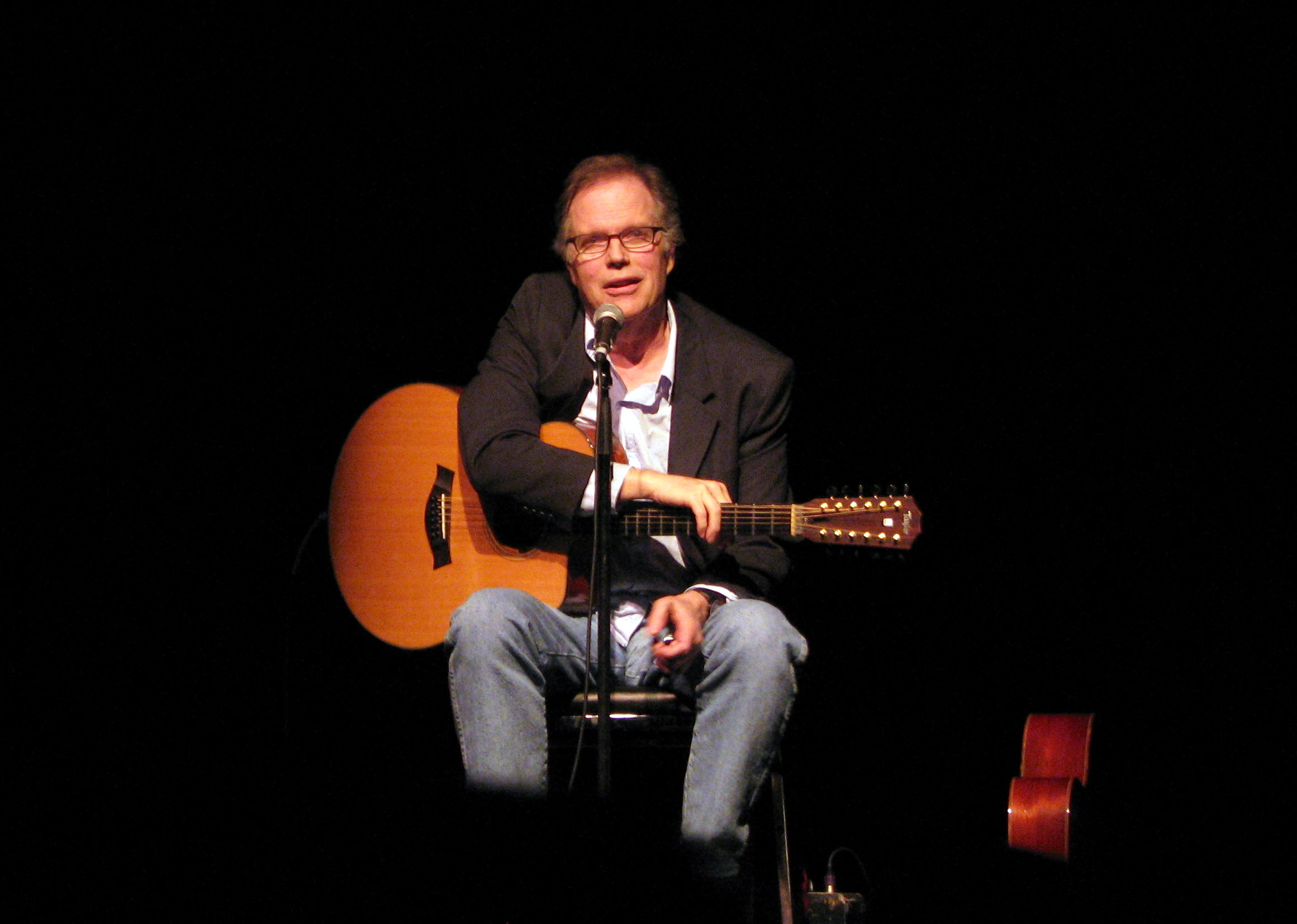
Kottke in concert, Kansas City, 2008

In the early 1970s, he recorded with vocals and backing musicians on albums. In 1972, he released Greenhouse, and in 1973, the live My Feet Are Smiling and Ice Water. Kottke closed out his contract with Capitol with his seventh album, Chewing Pine, in 1975. By then, he had gained an international following largely due to his performances at folk festivals. With the 1976 release of Leo Kottke, he moved to Chrysalis Records.

=== Injury and new playing style ===
In the early 1980s, Kottke began to suffer from painful tendinitis and related nerve damage caused by his vigorous and aggressive picking style (particularly on the 12-string guitar). As a result, he changed his picking style to a classical style, using the flesh of his fingertips and increasingly small amounts of fingernail rather than fingerpicks, and changing the positioning of the right hand to place less stress on the tendons. A flat pick is often used in conjunction with his fingers, a style called hybrid picking. He has studied more classical and jazz-oriented compositional and playing techniques.

He took a long break from recording and performing, and simultaneously moved from his relationship with major labels to the smaller Private Music label. Private Music was considered a new-age music label in the Windham Hill style, and Kottke often found his music categorized as such during this period. After the reflective A Shout Toward Noon, in 1986, he took a brief break from recording before returning with Regards from Chuck Pink in 1988.

=== Later career ===
Kottke released an album annually from 1989 to 1991: My Father's Face, followed by That's What, and then Great Big Boy, which featured guest appearances by Lyle Lovett and Margo Timmins. Two years later, he returned with Peculiaroso, produced by Rickie Lee Jones. The solo album One Guitar, No Vocals was released in 1999. In 2004, Kottke released another solo album, Try and Stop Me (2004).

In 2002, Kottke and Mike Gordon (the bassist from the band Phish, which was on an extended hiatus) collaborated on Clone, an album featuring instrumental work and vocals from both musicians. A second album from the pair, Sixty Six Steps, followed in 2005. The duo toured in support of both albums. In August 2020, Kottke and Gordon announced a new collaborative album, Noon, released that month on Megaplum/ATO Records. It was their first collaboration since Sixty Six Steps and Kottke's first studio album since 2005.

Kottke received an honorary doctorate in music performance from the University of Wisconsin–Milwaukee on May 18, 2008, where he gave the commencement address.

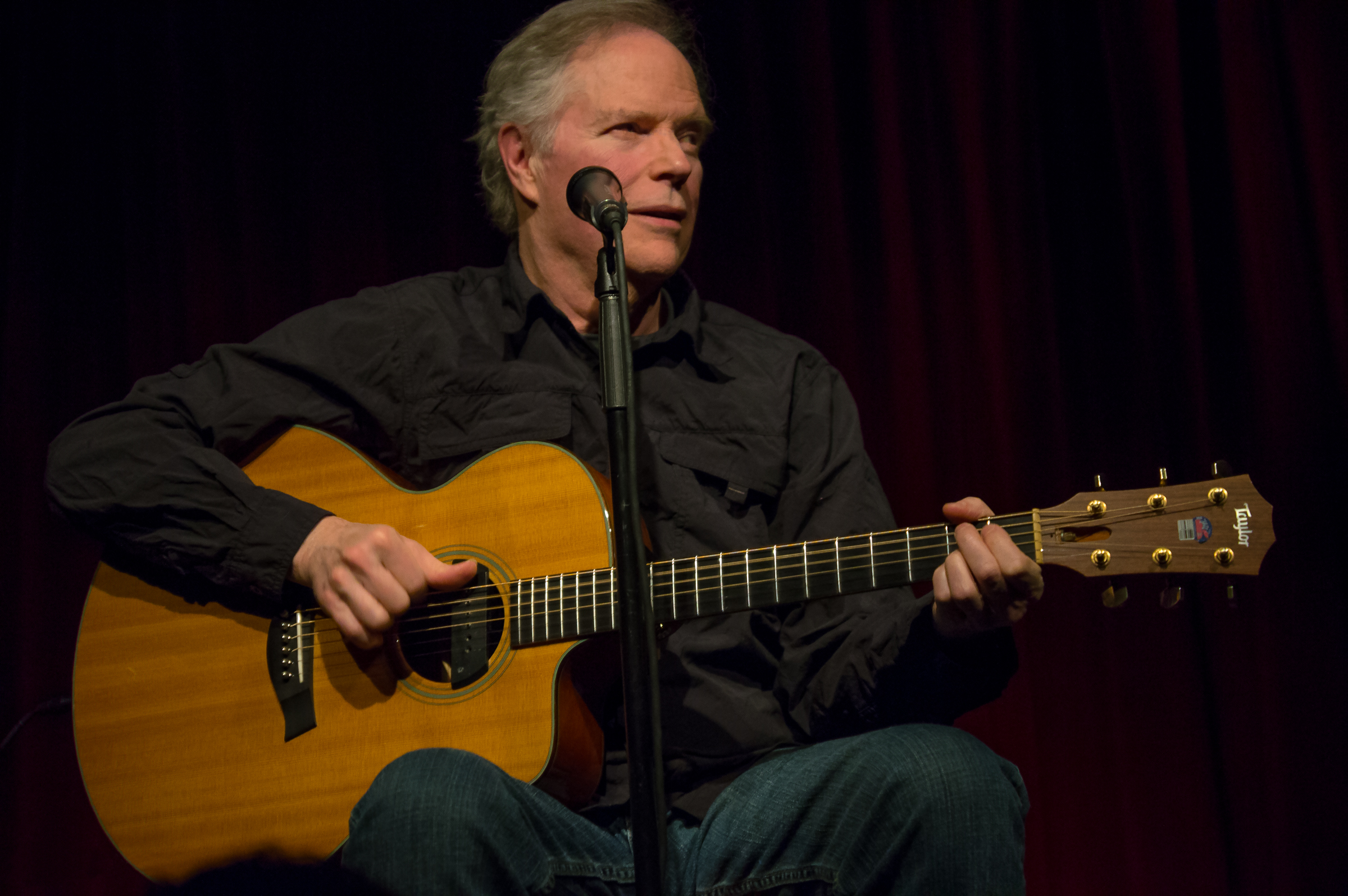
Kottke at City Winery, New York City, March 2014

== Tunings ==
Kottke's guitars are often tuned unconventionally; early in his career, he heavily used open tuning, while in recent years, he has used more traditional settings, but often tunes his guitars as many as two full steps below standard tuning.

== Orchestral works, re-recordings, and other collaborations ==
In 1976, Kottke collaborated with arranger Jack Nitzsche on the release Leo Kottke, which featured Kottke backed by a small orchestral section on a number of tracks. In the later part of his career, he has begun reworking and re-recording tunes he wrote and recorded in the early 1970s. For example, 1999's One Guitar No Vocals offered a new instrumental version of 1974's "Morning Is the Long Way Home", with the countermelody opened up from behind the vocal line, stripped of its original trippy lyrics.

Kottke combined previously recorded tunes into new compositions, notably the minisuite "Bigger Situation", also released on One Guitar No Vocals. In 1990, Kottke and composer Stephen Paulus created Ice Fields, a work for amplified acoustic guitar and orchestra in a concerto format. Ice Fields featured five movements, each based on an existing Kottke composition, with orchestral backing and interlude sections. It was premiered by Paulus's Atlanta Symphony Orchestra, and has been performed occasionally since, but has not been released on record, partly because of the high cost of producing a recording with a full orchestra.

== Videography ==
1. Home and Away (1988), Wienerworld
2. Home and Away Revisited (2006), Mvd Visual
