= New acoustic music =

Music genre

New acoustic music is a music genre that blends influences from folk, bluegrass, jazz and world music and uses only acoustic instruments. Beginning in the 1970s, it has been developed by artists such as Béla Fleck, David Grisman, Leo Kottke, Tim Ware, Tony Rice, Mike Marshall, Darol Anger and others.

== See also ==
- American primitive guitar
- Folk baroque
