= American primitive guitar =

Fingerstyle guitar music genre

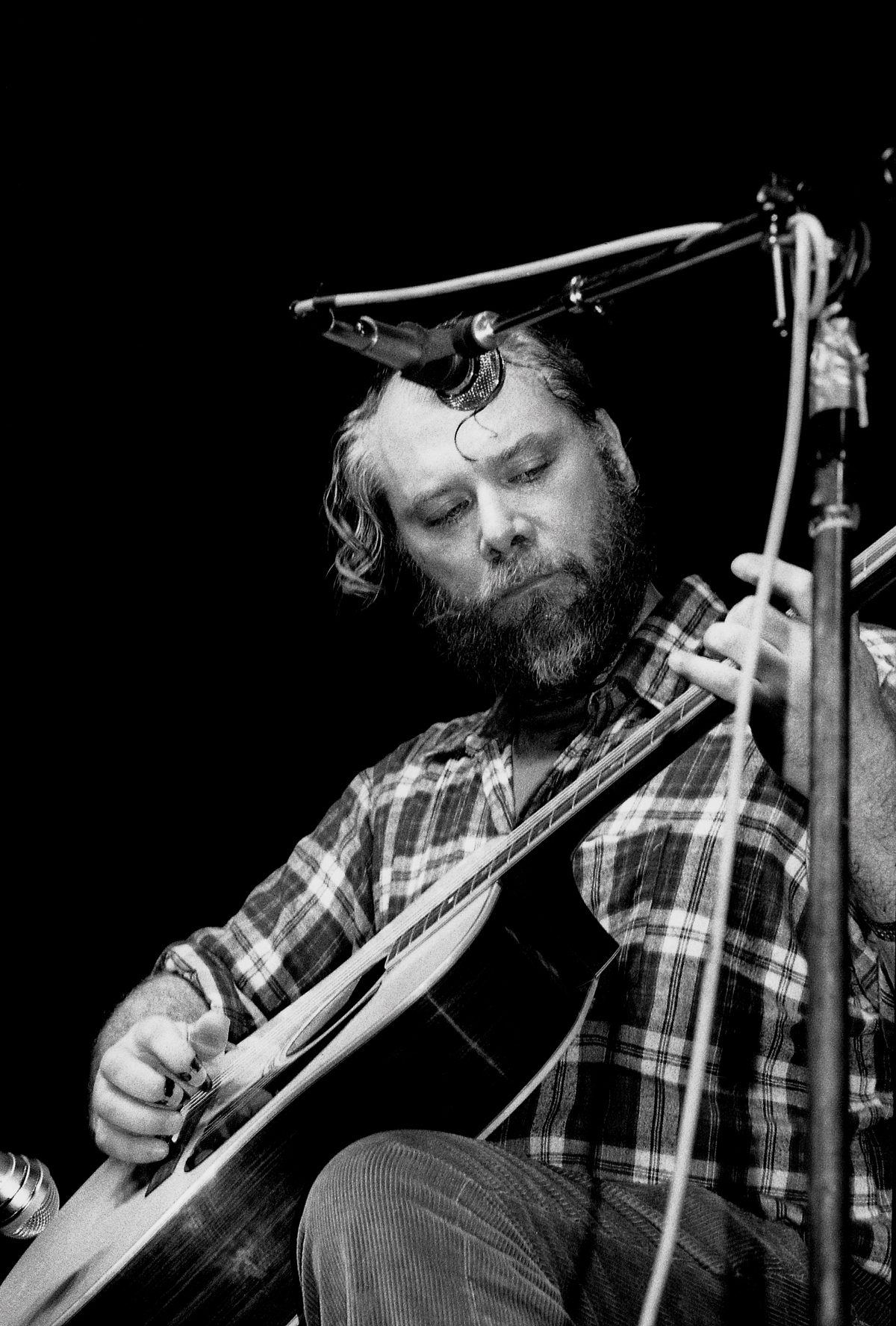
- John Fahey
- Other names: American primitivism
- Stylistic origins: Contemporary folk music; old-time music; Country blues
- Cultural origins: 1950s, United States
- Typical instruments: Steel-string acoustic guitar

Other topics
- Roots revival; bluegrass; country; blues

American primitive guitar is a fingerstyle guitar music genre, developed by the American guitarist John Fahey in the late 1950s. While the term "American primitivism" has been used as a name for the genre, American primitive guitar is distinct from the primitivism art movement.

== Development ==
John Fahey used the term "American primitive guitar" to describe the style of composition he developed in his releases from the 1950s onwards. Fahey employed traditional country blues fingerpicking techniques, which had previously been used primarily to accompany vocals, on solo guitar, in combination with nontraditional harmonic and melodic material. Throughout the 1960s and 1970s, other musicians would become associated with the genre, including Leo Kottke. The style is similar to some forms of 20th-century classical music (particularly Minimalism), and the classical music of India. Besides Fahey, other notable representatives of this genre include Kottke, Robbie Basho, Bob Hadley, and Peter Lang, who released recordings on Fahey's Takoma Records label.

In the 1970s and 80s, some of the musicians of the genre have integrated new-age guitar techniques and have come to be broadly categorized into the New Acoustic genre. Potentially because the new age guitarist William Ackerman cited Fahey, Basho, and Kottke as influences, critics began to associate Fahey with new-age music. Fahey himself rejected any influence upon or responsibility for the genre, referring to it derisively as "hot tub music" and feeling that any association with New Age meant that he had failed as an artist.

Peter Lang, a guitarist associated with the genre, described American primitive guitar, writing: ". . . The New Age people call it Folk; the Folk people call it New Age, but it is really neither. It's transitional. The style is derived from the country blues and string band music of the '20s and '30s, however much of the music is contemporary. Fahey referred to it as 'American Primitive' after the 'French Primitive' painters, meaning untutored."

== See also ==
- New acoustic music
- Folk baroque
