= Best (Robert Earl Keen album) =

Greatest hits album by Robert Earl Keen
- Released: November 7, 2006
- Recorded: Jul 1992 – August 12, 1995
- Genre: Alternative country
- Length: 75:18
- Label: Koch

Robert Earl Keen chronology
Live at the Ryman (2006)	Best (2006)	Marfa After Dark (2008)

Best, a compilation album by folk singer-songwriter Robert Earl Keen, released by Koch Records on November 7, 2006. The album features songs from six of Keen's previous albums: No Kinda Dancer, A Bigger Piece of Sky, No. 2 Live Dinner, Farm Fresh Onions, What I Really Mean, and Live at the Ryman: The Greatest Show Ever Been Gave.

== Reception ==
The AllMusic review by Mark Deming gave the album 3½ stars stating: "Robert Earl Keen is an archetypal Texas singer/songwriter, someone who can mine both laughter and tragedy from life along the dusty margins of life in the Lone Star State... a comprehensive and well-programmed compilation offering a fully rounded introduction to his music would be more than welcome. However, 2007's Best isn't quite that album... If you're looking for a concise, career-spanning overview of Robert Earl Keen's long career in music, Best isn't as much help as you might wish, but the consistent quality is a sure convincer."

Professional ratings
Review scores
Source	Rating
Allmusic	3.5/5 stars

== Track listing ==
All tracks by Robert Earl Keen except where noted

1. "No Kinda Dancer" (from No Kinda Dancer) – 3:07
2. "Willie" (from No Kinda Dancer) – 2:36
3. "Armadillo Jackal" (from No Kinda Dancer) – 3:26
4. "Paint the Town Beige" (from A Bigger Piece Of Sky) – 4:34
5. "Whenever Kindness Fails" (from A Bigger Piece Of Sky) – 3:38
6. "Corpus Christi Bay" (from A Bigger Piece Of Sky) – 3:59
7. "Merry Christmas from the Family" (from No. 2 Live Dinner) – 3:54
8. "The Road Intro" (from No. 2 Live Dinner) – 5:08
9. "The Road Goes on Forever" (from No. 2 Live Dinner) – 7:45
10. "Furnace Fan" (from Farm Fresh Onions) – 3:58
11. "All I Have Is Today" (from Farm Fresh Onions) – 3:28
12. "Let the Music Play" (Keen, Bill Whitbeck) (from Farm Fresh Onions) – 5:36
13. "For Love" (from What I Really Mean) – 4:24
14. "Mr. Wolf and Mama Bear" (from What I Really Mean) – 3:46
15. "Ride" (from What I Really Mean) – 3:45
16. "Feeling Good Again" (from Live At The Ryman) – 3:15
17. "Gringo Honeymoon" (from Live At The Ryman) – 4:53
18. "I'm Comin' Home" (from Live At The Ryman) – 4:17

== Personnel ==
- Robert Pool – Fender Bass
- Dan Augustine – horn arrangements, trombone, tuba
- Danny Barnes – banjo
- Rich Brotherton – audio production, acoustic guitar, electric guitar, rhythm guitar, producer, vocal harmony
- Nick Connolly – organ
- Bryan Duckworth – fiddle
- Dave Durocher – drums, vocal harmony, backing vocals
- Joe Ely – pedal steel
- Denice Franke – vocal harmony, vocals, backing vocals
- Nanci Griffith – vocal harmony, backing vocals
- Fred Gumaer – drums
- John Hagen – cello
- Melissa Story Haycraft – executive producer
- Dan Huckabee – dobro
- Robert Earl Keen Jr. – audio production, acoustic guitar, rhythm guitar, producer, vocals
- Mike Landschoot – acoustic guitar, electric guitar
- Randy LeRoy – mastering
- Lyle Lovett – vocal harmony, backing vocals
- Lloyd Maines – audio production, pedal steel, producer
- George Marinelli – electric guitar, vocal harmony, backing vocals
- Ian McLagan – organ
- Eamon McLoughlin – fiddle, viola
- Marty Muse – pedal steel
- Riley Osborne – piano
- Chuck Rhodes – production coordination
- Phil Richey – trumpet
- Elliott Rogers – backing vocals
- Bill Schas – trombone
- Michael Snow – bodhran, tenor banjo
- Jay Spell – accordion
- Tommy Spurlock – acoustic guitar, gut string guitar, lap steel guitar, pedal steel
- Marty Stuart – mandolin
- Paul Sweeney – mandolin
- Garry Tallent – electric bass, upright bass
- Tom Van Schaik – drums, percussion
- Garry Velletri – audio production, producer
- Bill Whitbeck – bass, electric bass
- Elizabeth Yoon – art direction, design
- Jonathan Yudkin – violin
