= Joe Ely discography =

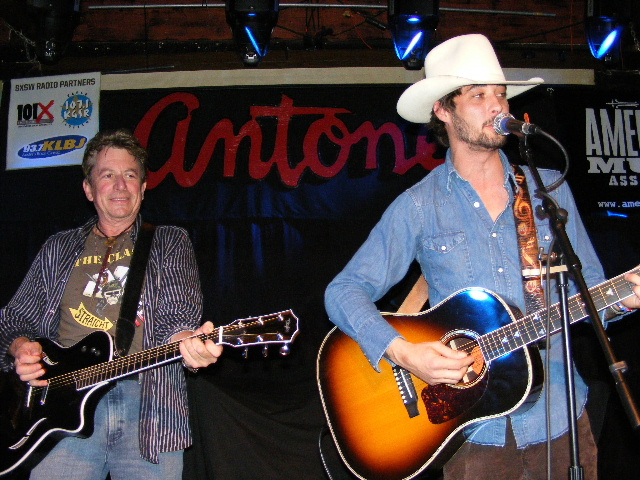
- Ely (left) and Ryan Bingham in 2008 at Antone's during SXSW in Austin, Texas
- Studio albums: 16
- EPs: 1
- Live albums: 6
- Compilation albums: 13
- Singles: 20
- Music videos: 6

Joe Ely is an American singer-songwriter. His discography consists of 16 studio albums, 6 live albums (includes 1 EP), 20 singles, 13 compilations, 1 studio EP, and 6 music videos. In addition, he has been a performer on numerous albums by other artists.

== Studio albums ==
Year	Album	Chart Positions				Label
Year	Album	US Country	US	US Heat	US Folk	Label
1977	Joe Ely					MCA
1978	Honky Tonk Masquerade					MCA
1979	Down on the Drag					MCA
1981	Musta Notta Gotta Lotta		135			MCA
1984	Hi-Res		204			MCA
1987	Lord of the Highway					Hightone
1988	Dig All Night					Hightone
1992	Love and Danger					MCA
1995	Letter to Laredo	68				MCA
1998	Twistin' in the Wind	55				MCA
2003	Streets of Sin	51				Rounder
2007	Happy Songs from Rattlesnake Gulch					Rack 'Em Records
2007	Silver City					Rack 'Em Records
2011	Satisfied At Last	46		18		Rack 'Em Records
2015	Panhandle Rambler	43		24	18	Rack 'Em Records
2020	Love In the Midst of Mayhem					Rack 'Em Records
2024	Driven To Drive					
2025	Love and Freedom					

== Live albums ==
Year	Album	Chart Positions				Label
Year	Album	US Country	US	US Heat	US Folk	Label
1980	Live Shots		159			MCA
1990	Live at Liberty Lunch	57				MCA
1998	Live at the Cambridge Folk Festival (EP)					Strange Fruit
2000	Live @ Antones	66				Antones
2008	LIVE Cactus! (with Joel Guzmán)					Rack 'Em Records
2009	LIVE Chicago 1987!					Rack 'Em Records

== Compilations ==
Year	Album	Label	Notes
1988	Milkshakes and Malts	Sunstorm	Compiles Ely's covers of Butch Hancock compositions.
1989	What Ever Happened to Maria	Sunstorm	Compiles tracks from Ely's first 3 albums.
1995	"No Bad Talk Or Loud Talk" '77-'81	Edsel	Compiles tracks from Ely's first 5 albums.
1995	Time For Travelin‘ (The Best Of Joe Ely Volume Two)	Edsel	Compiles tracks from Ely's first 5 albums that were not included on No Bad Talk Or Loud Talk.
2000	Joe Ely / Honky Tonk Masquerade	BGO	A compilation of both albums.
2000	The Best Of Joe Ely	MCA	Compiles tracks from albums starting with Joe Ely through Letter to Laredo
2002	From Lubbock to Laredo: The Best of Joe Ely	MCA	Selected tracks compiled and annotated by Sid Griffin.
2004	Settle For Love	HighTone	Compiles tracks from Lord of the Highway and Dig All Night plus 2 bonus tracks.
2009	Down On The Drag/Live Shots	BGO	A compilation of both albums.
2009	Musta Notta Gotta Lotta / Hi-Res	BGO	A compilation of both albums.
2012	Lord Of The Highway / Dig All Night	Shout! Factory	A compilation of both albums.
2014	B4 84 - Pearls From The Vault Series	Rack 'Em Records	Compiles stripped-down demos from the Hi-Res sessions, including 2 songs that were not included on the Hi-Res album.
2018	Full Circle: The Lubbock Tapes	Rack 'Em Records	A collection of full band demos by Joe Ely from 1974 to 1978, including demos that helped him with the record deal with MCA. Most of the songs were later officially recorded and released on Joe's early albums.

== EPs ==
Year	Title	Label	Tracks
1981	Texas Special	MCA	"Crazy Lemon" / "Not Fade Away" / "Treat Me Like a Saturday Night" / "Wishin' For You"

== Singles ==
Year	Single	Peak chart positions		Album
Year	Single	US Country	US MSR	Album
1977	"All My Love"	89	—	Joe Ely
1977	"She Never Spoke Spanish To Me" / "All My Love"	—	—	Joe Ely
1977	"Tennessee's Not The State I'm In"	—	—	Joe Ely
1977	"Gambler's Bride" / "Tennessee's Not The State I'm In"	—	—	Joe Ely
1978	"Honky Tonk Masquerade"	—	—	Honky Tonk Masquerade
1978	"Fingernails" / "Because of the Wind"	—	—	Honky Tonk Masquerade
1979	"Down On The Drag" / "In Another World"	—	—	Down on the Drag
1980	"Fingernails" / "Suckin' a Big Bottle of Gin" / "Standin' at the Big Hotel"	—	—	Live Shots
1981	"Musta Notta Gotta Lotta" / "Wishin´ For You"	—	40	Musta Notta Gotta Lotta
1981	"Dallas" / "Hard Livin´"	—	—	Musta Notta Gotta Lotta
1981	"Dallas" / "Wishin' For You"	—	—	Musta Notta Gotta Lotta
1984	"What's Shakin Tonight"	—	—	Hi-Res
1987	"Lord Of The Highway"	—	—	Lord Of The Highway
1987	"My Baby Thinks She's French" / "No Rope, Daisy-O" /	—	—	Lord Of The Highway
1988	"Settle For Love" / "Jazz Street" / "Rich Man, Poor Man"	—	—	Dig All Night
1988	"Grandfather Blues" / "My Eyes Got Lucky"	—	—	Dig All Night
1990	"Row Of Dominoes" / "Me & Billy The Kid"	—	—	Live at Liberty Lunch
1993	"Highways and Heartaches"	—	—	Love and Danger
1996	"All Just to Get to You"	—	—	Letter to Laredo
2011	"You Can Bet I'm Gone"	—	—	Satisfied at Last
"—" denotes releases that did not chart

== Guest singles ==
Year	Single	Artist	Peak positions	Album
Year	Single	Artist	US Country	Album
1992	"Sweet Suzanne"	Buzzin' Cousins	68	Falling from Grace soundtrack

== Music videos ==
Year	Video	Director
1984	"What's Shakin' Tonight"	
1987	"My Baby Thinks She's French"	
1992	"Sweet Suzanne" (Buzzin' Cousins)	Marty Callner
1993	"Highways and Heartaches"	Deaton-Flanigen
1996	"All Just To Get To You"	Adrian Pasdar
2016	"Southern Eyes"	

== As a member of the Flatlanders ==
- 1980: One Road More (Charly)
- 1990: More A Legend Than A Band (Rounder) - initially released in 1976 as All American Music in a limited run on 8-track tape
- 1995: Unplugged (Sun) - recorded in March 1972
- 2002: Now Again (New West)
- 2003: Wheels of Fortune (New West)
- 2004: Live at the One Knite: June 8th, 1972 (New West)
- 2004: Live From Austin TX [DVD] (New West)
- 2009: Hills And Valleys (New West)
- 2012: The Odessa Tapes (New West) - unreleased 1972 recordings

== As a member of Los Super Seven ==
- 1998: Los Super Seven (RCA/BMG)
- 2001: Canto (Columbia)
- 2005: Heard It On The X (Telarc)

== As composer ==
- 1985: Lisa Rhodes - Shivers (Spindletop) - track 3, "I'll Be Your Fool"
- 1988: Jimmie Dale Gilmore - Fair & Square (Hightone) - track 2, "Honky Tonk Masquerade"
- 1988: Guy Clark - Old Friends (Sugar Hill) - track 7, "The Indian Cowboy"
- 1988: Mack Abernathy - Different Situations (CMI) - track 10, "Honky Tonk Masquerade
- 1991: Kelly Willis - Bang Bang (MCA) - track 10, "Settle For Love"
- 1994: Townes Van Zandt - Roadsongs (Sugar Hill) - track 7, "The Indian Cowboy"
- 1994: various artists - Howl... A Farewell Compilation Of Unreleased Songs (Glitterhouse) - track 4, "Honky Tonk Masquerade" (performed by Joe Henry)
- 1998: Ramblin' Jack Elliott - Friends Of Mine (HighTone) - track 2, "Me & Billy The Kid"
- 2010: John Train - All of Your Stories (Chapter 7) - track 8, "Because of the Wind"
- 2010: Rod Taylor - Here, There, Or Anywhere (Broken Horn) - track 10, "The Indian Cowboy"
- 2012: Pat Green - Songs We Wish We'd Written, Vol. 2 (Sugar Hill) - track 1, "All Just to Get to You" (co-written with Will Sexton)
- 2014: Jason D. Williams - Hillbillies and Holy Rollers (MRI / Rock-A-Billy) - track 5, "Fingernails"

== As primary artist/song contributor ==
- 1978: various artists - Kerrville Folk Festival 1978 (PSG) - track 2, "Livin' On A Dry Land Farm" (with Butch Hancock)
- 1992: various artists - Buddy's Buddys: The Buddy Holly Songbook (Connoisseur Collection) - track 20, "Rock Me My Baby"
- 1992: various artists - Across the Great Divide: Songs of Jo Carol Pierce (Deja Disc) - track 2, "Queen Of Heaven"
- 1994: various artists - Songs from Chippy (Hollywood Records) producer w/ Terry Allen; performer on tracks - "Goodnight Dear Diary", "Buildin' More Fires", "Cold Black Hammer", "Whiskey And Women And Money To Burn", "Goodnight", "Cup Of Tea" w/ Jo Harvey Allen, "Oil Wells" w/ Jo Harvey Allen (narration), "Fate With A Capital F" w/ Terry Allen, "Boomtown Boogie" w/ Terry Allen and Butch Hancock and Jo Harvey Allen
- 1994: various artists - Brace Yourself! A Tribute To Otis Blackwell (Shanachie) - track 11, "Great Balls of Fire"
- 1994: various artists - Tulare Dust : A Songwriter's Tribute to Merle Haggard (HighTone) - track 6, "White Line Fever"
- 1995: various artists - For the Love of Harry: Everybody Sings Nilsson (MusicMasters) - track 5, "Joy"
- 1995: various artists - Texans Live From Mountain Stage (Blue Plate) - track 9, "I Had My Hopes Up High"
- 1996: various artists - Not Fade Away (Remembering Buddy Holly) (Decca / MCA) - track 8, "Oh Boy!" (with Todd Snider)
- 2000: various artists - KGSR Broadcasts Vol. 8 (KGSR) - track 2-1, "Dallas" (with the Flatlanders); track 3-3, "The Indian Cowboy"
- 2001: various artists - Daddy-O Daddy! Rare Family Songs of Woody Guthrie (Rounder) - track 2, "Want To See Me Grow" and track 12, "Tippy Tap Toe" (both with Jimmie Dale Gilmore)
- 2002: various artists - KGSR Broadcasts Vol. 10 (KGSR) - track 2-1, "I Had My Hopes Up High" (with the Flatlanders)
- 2003: various artists - Light Of Day: A Tribute to Bruce Springsteen (Schoolhouse) - track 2-18, "Working on the Highway"
- 2003: various artists - KGSR Broadcasts Vol. 11 (KGSR) - track 2-14, "Streets Of Sin"
- 2006: various artists - A Case for Case: A Tribute to the Songs of Peter Case (Hungry For Music) - track 2-2, "Put Down The Gun"
- 2006: various artists - Sail Away: The Songs Of Randy Newman (Sugar Hill) - track 4, "Rider In The Rain" (with Reckless Kelly)
- 2009: various artists - Man of Somebody's Dreams: A Tribute to Chris Gaffney (Yep Roc) - track 1, "Lift Your Leg"
- 2010: various artists - KGSR Broadcasts Vol. 18 (KGSR) - track 1-4, "Midnight Train"
- 2011: various artists - This One's for Him: A Tribute to Guy Clark (Icehouse) - track 2-1, "Dublin Blues"

== Other appearances ==
=== 1978 - 1989 ===
- 1978: Terry Allen - Lubbock (On Everything) (Fate) - harmonica
- 1979: Butch Hancock - The Wind's Dominion (Rainlight) - resonator guitar
- 1980: Terry Allen and the Panhandle Mystery Band - Smokin' the Dummy (Fate) - harmonica
- 1982: The Clash - Combat Rock (CBS / Epic) - backing vocals
- 1983: Terry Allen and the Panhandle Mystery Band - Bloodlines (Fate) - backing vocals
- 1984: Robert Earl Keen - No Kinda Dancer (Philo) - steel guitar on track 4, "Swervin' In My Lane"
- 1986: Darden Smith - Native Soil (Redi-Mix / Watermelon) - steel guitar on track 7, "Wild West Show"
- 1988: Jimmie Dale Gilmore - Fair & Square (Hightone) - vocals
- 1989: Butch Hancock - Own & Own (Demon / Sugar Hill) - guitar, backing vocals
- 1989: Kimmie Rhodes - Angels Get The Blues (Heartland) - vocals
- 1989: Syd Straw - Surprise (Virgin) - guest on track 12, "Learning The Game" (bonus track on 2000 reissue)

=== 1990 - present ===
- 1993: Uncle Tupelo - Anodyne (Rhino / Sire) - guitar, vocal on track 15, "Are You Sure Hank Done It This Way" (bonus track)
- 1993: Rosie Flores - Once More with Feeling (HighTone) - guest artist on track 3, "Love and Danger"
- 1996: Terry Allen - Human Remains (Sugar Hill) - backing vocals
- 1997: Scotty Moore and D.J. Fontana - All The King's Men (Polydor) - track 5, "I'm Gonna Strangle You Shortly" (with Lee Rocker)
- 1999: Aztex - Short Stories (HighTone) - special guest
- 2003: The Chieftains - Further Down the Old Plank Road (Victor / Arista) - track 8, "The Moonshiner/I'm A Rambler"
- 2004: Tom Russell - Indians Cowboys Horses Dogs (HighTone) - lead vocal on track 6, "Lily, Rosemary and the Jack of Hearts"
- 2005: Original Bells Of Joy - Original Bells Of Joy and Friends (Dialtone) - shared lead vocal on track 1, "Sinner Man"
- 2005: James McMurtry - Childish Things (Lightning Rod / Compadre) - vocals on track 4, "Slew Foot"
- 2015: Tom Russell - The Rose of Roscrae (Proper) - vocals
- 2016: Robert Earl Keen - Live Dinner Reunion (Dualtone) - guitar, vocals on track 2-11, "The Road Goes On Forever"

== Sources ==
- Ely.com - Official home page
- Joe Ely at AllMusic
- Joe Ely discography at Discogs
