= Sonora's Death Row =

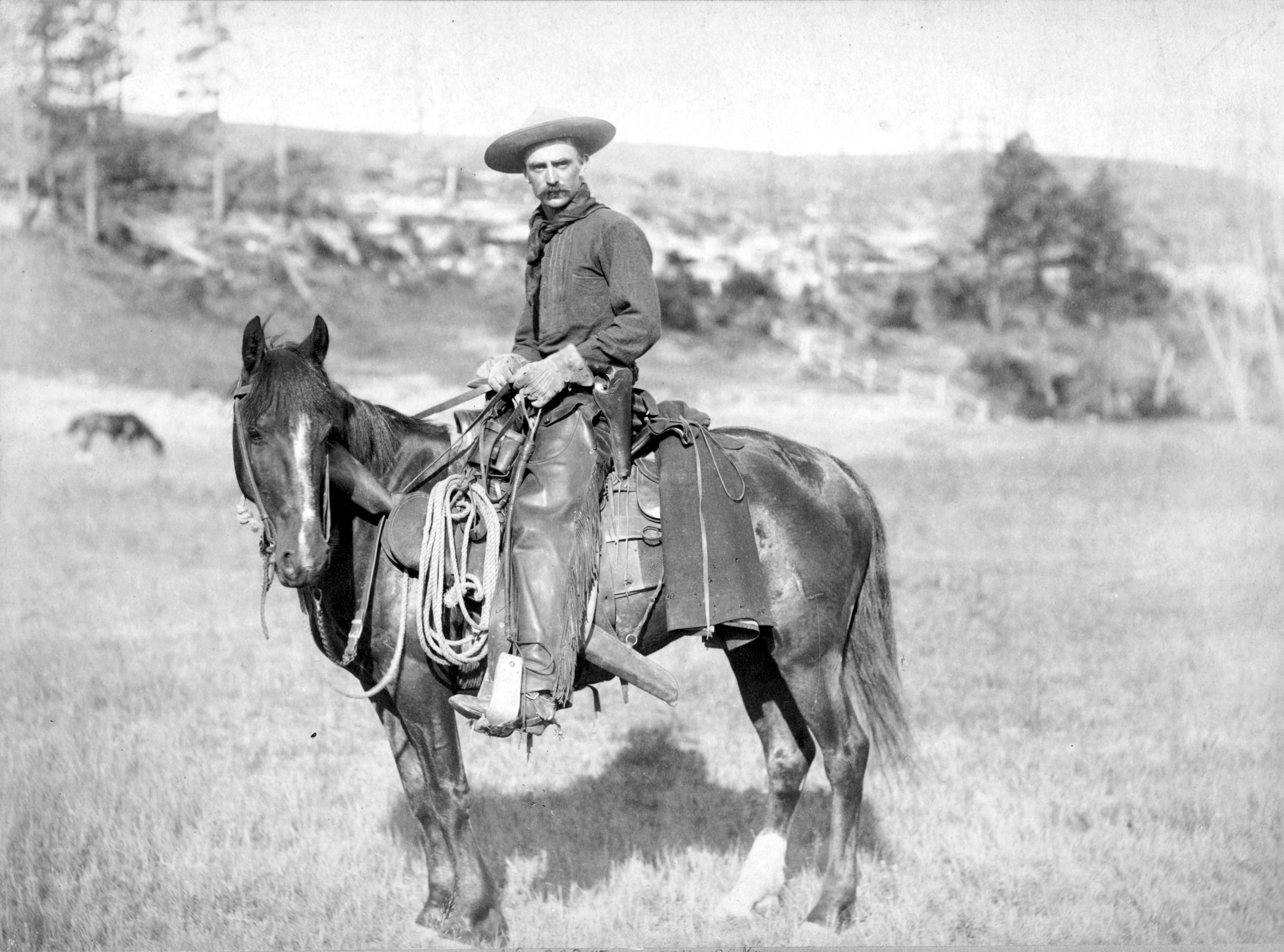
The lyrics of "Sonora's Death Row" tell a story from the viewpoint of an American cowboy in Mexican border country. The time period is not made clear.

"Sonora’s Death Row" is a story song written by California songwriter Kevin "Blackie" Farrell and published by Drifter Music/Bug Music (BMI) Recorded covers of the song have been performed by Robert Earl Keen, Leo Kottke, Michael Martin Murphey, Tom Russell, Richard Shindell, Dave Alvin, Johnny Rodriguez and others. The song was also printed in the 1995 Spring issue of Sing Out! with the following introduction:

Legendary Texas Ranger and Arizona Border Guard Jeff Milton once described Sonora as a hell and a paradise, Michael Martin Murphey tells us. Blackie Farrell's classic Old West ballad, Murphey says, "captures the dangers implicit in cowboys on a tequila spree."

== Storyline ==
A plot develops over the song's six verses (the song has no chorus). The song tells the story of a cowboy who rides into the Mexican town of Sonora with his partners from the "Broken 'O'" ranch on a Saturday night. After considerable drinking and gambling in "Amanda’s Saloon" he imagines himself being robbed by his friends. His dream becomes a nightmare when in a drunken rage he shoots and kills one of his friends. He soon finds himself contemplating his situation as he awaits his execution. The story is told in the first person and the final verse touches on many of the song's earlier motifs and ends with a repeated lament by the narrator:

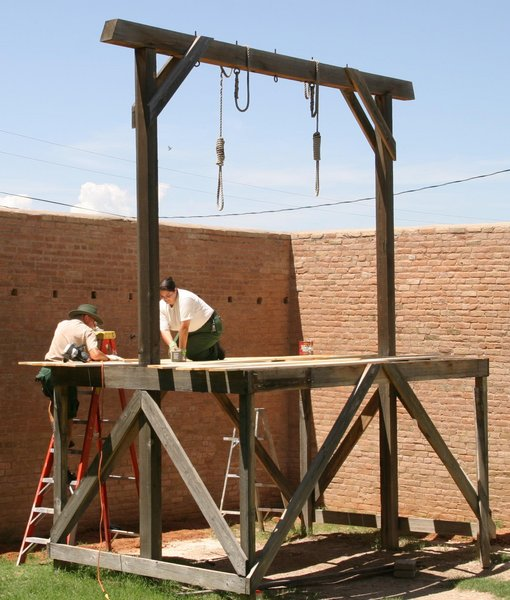
"I wish I was dreamin' the sound of the gallows they're testin' just outside the wall."

A nightmare of mezcal was all that it was
No one had robbed me at all
I wish I was dreamin' the sound of the gallows
They're testin' just outside the wall
And the mezcal's still free in Amanda's saloon
For the boys from the old Broken "O"
I'd pay a ransom to drink there today
An' be free of Sonora's Death Row
Yeah I'd pay a ransom to drink there today
An' be free of Sonora's Death Row

Although the time period is not made clear in the song, a reference to a Winchester rifle suggest the account takes place in the late 19th or early 20th century. Also, though the song describes a town called Sonora, it is difficult to say whether the writer had a specific location in mind. Sonora is actually a Mexican State that accounts for a long stretch of the U.S.-Mexico border adjacent to the U.S. states of Arizona and New Mexico. Regarding his inspiration, Farrell himself has said: "I just envisioned a guy, saddling up his horse, riding off with his pals off the ranch, going into town just to blow off some steam on a Saturday night and winding up living a nightmare."

== Recordings ==
The song has been recorded numerous times over the course of a thirty-year period. Many of the cover artists are talented songwriters themselves. Versions by Alvin, Murphy, Keen, and Shindell have all received airplay in recent years by folk music DJs throughout the United States. The most recent album to include the song before Johnny Rodriguez's 2011 Live from Texas, Dave Alvin's West of the West reached the top five on the Americana Chart in June 2006. Frequently this song has been included in recordings with other songs having themes dealing with the American Old West.

Most of the recordings present the song in an acoustic or country rock setting, in some cases including an accordion or other instrumentation that give the song a traditional Mexican feel. Some include complex guitar arrangements that employ alternative tunings. In a couple of cases artists have edited out a verse of the song to reduce its length. The individual tracks vary in length from 4:10 to 5:35.

=== Discography / notes ===
Over a decade after earlier recordings, Robert Earl Keen included the song on his 1989 album West Textures and continued to introduce the song to audiences in live performances.

- The Moonlighters (Bill Kirchen, Moonlighters, 1977; Midnight in Memphis 1999.

The first to record this classic song, singer and guitarist Bill Kirchen has become a long-time collaborator with songwriter Kevin Blackie Farrell. Kirchen describes their first meeting:

I met him in 1969 when I went back to a girl's apartment to reclaim the Hank and Merle albums that I'd left a couple of months before. I was going up the stairs for 'em just as he was heading down with 'em under his arm, and after some circling and sniffing, we've been fast friends ever since.

Kirchen's 2001, Tied to the Wheel, inclucdes two new recordings of songs by Farrell and features Farrell on several tracks.

- Leo Kottke: Burnt Lips, 1978; Essential Leo Kottke, 1991; The Leo Kottke Anthology, 1997.

Kottke performs the song solo on guitar, apparently tuned to open G and using a mix of fingerpicking and slide work.

- Robert Earl Keen: West Textures, 1989; No. 2 Live Dinner, 1996; No. 2 Live Dinner (DVD), 2004.

Keen has recorded the song twice, first as a largely acoustic studio performance and then years later in a live concert employing his full electrified band. His recording has been transcribed for guitar in E-flat, placing a capo at the 3rd fret and playing the chords in C-position

- Tom Russell: Cowboy Real, 1991.

As with Kottke's recording, Russell omits the first verse of the song. Russell once referred to the song as "the best cowboy twist-of-fate song ever written."

- Michael Martin Murphey, Cowboy Songs III:Rhymes of The Renegades, 1993.

(See comments above in introduction.)

- Richard Shindell, The Sonora Sessions (a live bonus EP offered with Courier), 2002.

Shindell performs a version on guitar in DADGAD tuning with a capo positioned at the third fret (key of F).

- Dave Alvin, West of the West, 2006.

Alvin's recording omits the song's second verse. Regarding his own recording Alvin has stated: "'Sonora's Death Row' has been recorded by people like Robert Earl Keen, Leo Kottke and Michael Martin Murphy, and they all did fantastic interpretations. I tried to make my version different than the others by giving it less of a Mexican border song groove. I wanted it to sound more like a traditional Appalachian folk song that somehow got lost in the middle of Death Valley on the hottest day of August with no water and no sun screen."

- Jeffrey Foucault & Mark Erelli on Seven Curses (2010)
