= Gravitational Forces =

Studio album by Robert Earl Keen
- Released: August 7, 2001
- Genre: country, folk, singer-songwriter
- Length: 49:42
- Label: Lost Highway
- Producer: Gurf Morlix, Robert Earl Keen

Robert Earl Keen chronology
Walking Distance (1998)	Gravitational Forces (2001)	Farm Fresh Onions (2003)

Professional ratings
Review scores
Source	Rating
About.com	(favorable)
Allmusic	4.5/5 stars
Austin Chronicle	(favorable)
Country Music	(mixed)
Daily O'Collegian	(favorable)
Dirty Linen	(favorable)
Goldmine	(favorable)
The Music Box	4/5 stars
NetRhythms	(favorable)
New York Times	(mixed)
Performing Songwriter	(favorable)
Sing Out!	(favorable)

Gravitational Forces is an album by Texas-based country/folk singer-songwriter Robert Earl Keen. It was first released in the United States on August 7, 2001, on Lost Highway Records.

One reviewer described this album, Keen's ninth, as being "just a hair more to the country side of the folk-rock-country axis than ever before." Indeed, producer and multi-instrumentalist Gurf Morlix, and the various long-time members of Keen's own road band did not shy away from including fiddle solos and steel guitars in the mix when they suit Keen's songs. "I wanted to keep a real natural, organic sound," says Morlix, "My job as producer varies from artist to artist. I help them find the sound they want and then do what it takes to get that on record."

As usual, Keen's songwriting is full of narrative stories and character sketches. A review in Performing Songwriter magazine described the characters found in Gravitational Forces as "everyday people pulled, led, and sometimes dragged by some outside strength." Billboard noted, however, that Keen's more recent tales avoid some of the violent imagery found in some of his earlier songs. Keen has admitted, "Yeah, the body count's a little lower this time."

Keen began recording the album after his previous label, Arista Austin had closed down, and before finding his new, albeit brief, home on Lost Highway Records. "When we started this project I hadn't made a deal with any record company," Keen says, "I just knew I would have a deal one way or another." The release arrived at a time when Keen was beginning to receive wider recognition outside of his home state of Texas. It peaked at No. 10 on Billboard's Top Country Albums chart, later matched by his 2015 album Happy Prisoner:The Bluegrass Sessions as Keen's highest ranked albums on that chart.

== Song selection ==
The songs on the album that Keen did not write range from Johnny Cash's often-covered classic, "I Still Miss Someone" to Townes Van Zandt's more obscure "Snowin' on Raton". Keen and his band also cover the traditional blues, "Walkin' Cane" in what has been described as a "rowdy, back-porch take," and treat Terry Allen's "High Plains Jamboree" with a backdrop of "bar room party sounds."

The cover that reviewers most recognize as a choice pick to match Keen and his career outside of mainstream music is Joe Dolce's "Hall of Fame". Keen sings:

My Home ain't in the hall of fame
You can go there you won't find my name
And my songs don't belong on top forty radio
I'll keep the old back forty for my home.

Keen's own songs provide many of the album's highlights. "Wild Wind" is a harmonica-heavy minor key introduction to a series of tragic small-town characters, that will leave some listeners wanting to know more. Keen says that some of the characters that populate his songs are based upon "dead on real people" while others are composites. In "Wild Wind", he says, "there's a character that just sort of walks around town and sells papers. He's a mixture of about three or four guys that I know... In general I try to keep with real people, because I feel like you always want to have some hint of the truth where it makes it feel real to you."

"Not a Drop of Rain" is Keen's personal favorite from the album, "It's a very emotional song, written out of thinking what would happen if I lost everything I have." The song has a somewhat unusual guitar accompaniment played in DADGAD tuning and its structure eschews the traditional verse/chorus/verse song structure. Singer-songwriter Shawn Colvin fell in love with the song and began performing it. Her version was recorded in studio and released in 2002 on a compilation by radio station KGSR.

Keen's "Goin' Nowhere Blues" has been described as "chilling" and contains references to Langston Hughes, Woody Guthrie, Martin Luther King Jr., Cesar Chavez, and down-and-out union workers. Keen manages to connect the tragic aspects of all these disparate lives.

The title track, "Gravitational Forces", has been described as "sort of experimental" by some and "bizarre" or "hysterical" by others. Keen delivers a spoken stream of consciousness on the "temporal distortion of a four-hour soundcheck," complete with a free jazz accompaniment that caused one reviewer to liken it to Allen Ginsberg's reading of "Howl" backed by the Kronos Quartet.

Although one reviewer indicates that the closing track is Keen's first studio release of his own live signature song, "The Road Goes On Forever", Keen first recorded the song for his 1989 album West Textures. In the earlier recording the track was five minutes long, just enough to relate the plot twists in Keen's story. This time it's a seven-minute build-up to some intense and lengthy instrumental solos.

In an August 2001 taping of Austin City Limits, Keen and his band gave a live performance including many of these same songs. This was released in 2004 as the album, Live From Austin, TX.

== Track listing ==
- All tracks written by Robert Earl Keen, except where noted.
1. "My Home Ain't in the Hall of Fame" (Joe Dolce) – 3:04
  - Robert Earl Keen — lead vocals
  - Rich Brotherton — acoustic & electric lead guitars
  - Bill Whitbeck – bass guitar & harmony vocals
  - Gurf Morlix — steel, electric & baritone guitars and harmony vocals
  - Tom Van Schaik – drums
2. "Hello New Orleans" – 3:01
  - Robert Earl Keen – lead vocals
  - Rich Brotherton – acoustic, electric & 12-string guitars
  - Ian McLagan — Hammond B-3 organ
  - Gurf Morlix — beer bottle slide guitar
  - Bill Whitbeck — upright bass & harmony vocals
  - Tom Van Schaik – drums
3. "Wild Wind" – 5:12
  - Robert Earl Keen – lead vocals
  - Rich Brotherton – acoustic guitar & harmony vocals
  - Bill Whitbeck – bass guitar, harmony vocals, harmony concept & vocal arrangement
  - Gurf Morlix – acoustic & baritone guitars
  - Cody Braun – harmonica
  - Tom Van Schaik – drums
4. "Not a Drop of Rain" – 4:09
  - Robert Earl Keen – lead vocals
  - Rich Brotherton – acoustic guitar
  - Bill Whitbeck – bass guitar & harmony vocals
  - Bryan Duckworth — mandolin
  - Gurf Morlix – beer bottle slide guitar
  - Ian McLagan – Hammond B-3 organ
  - Tom Van Schaik – drums
5. "I Still Miss Someone" (Johnny Cash, Roy Cash) – 3:19
  - Robert Earl Keen – lead vocals
  - Rich Brotherton – acoustic & electric guitars and harmony vocals
  - Bill Whitbeck – bass guitar & harmony vocals
  - Bryan Duckworth — fiddle & mandolin
  - Tom Van Schaik – drums
6. "Fallin' Out" – 3:25
  - Robert Earl Keen – lead vocals
  - Rich Brotherton – acoustic guitar
  - Bill Whitbeck – bass guitar & harmony vocals
  - Gurf Morlix – electric & lap steel guitars and harmonium
  - Tom Van Schaik – drums & percussion
7. "High Plains Jamboree" (Terry Allen) – 3:10
  - Robert Earl Keen – lead vocals
  - Rich Brotherton – acoustic, electric & baritone guitars
  - Bill Whitbeck – bass guitar & tic-tac bass guitar
  - Tommy Delamore – steel guitar
  - Byran Duckworth – fiddle
  - Tom Van Schaik – drums
  - "Bar Room Party Sound" — Kathy Brotherton, Rich Brotherton, Gurf Morlix, Laurie Galbraith & Robert Earl Keen
8. "Walkin' Cane" (traditional, arranged by Robert Earl Keen) – 4:43
  - Robert Earl Keen – lead vocals
  - Rich Brotherton – slide, electric & National slide guitars guitars and harmony vocals
  - Bill Whitbeck – upright bass & harmony vocals
  - Bryan Duckworth – fiddle
  - Gurf Morlix – mandolin
  - Tom Van Schaik – drums & percussion
9. "Goin' Nowhere Blues" – 4:47
  - Robert Earl Keen – lead vocals
  - Rich Brotherton – acoustic guitar
  - Bill Whitbeck – upright bass
  - Ian McLagan – Hammond B-3 organ
  - Gurf Morlix – acoustic & electric guitars
  - Tom Van Schaik – drums & percussion
10. "Snowin' on Raton" (Townes Van Zandt) – 5:01
  - Robert Earl Keen – lead vocals
  - Rich Brotherton – electricguitar & harmony vocals
  - Bill Whitbeck – bass guitar & harmony vocals
  - Marty Muse – steel guitar
  - Freddie Fletcher — pizza box percussion
11. "Gravitational Forces" – 2:41
  - Robert Earl Keen – lead vocals
  - Rich Brotherton – acoustic guitar
  - Bill Whitbeck – bass guitar
  - Tom Van Schaik – drums & percussion
12. "The Road Goes On Forever" – 7:10 †
  - Robert Earl Keen – lead vocals
  - Rich Brotherton – electric & baritone guitars and mandolin
  - Bill Whitbeck – bass
  - Ray Kennedy — electric guitar
  - Marty Muse – steel guitar
  - Tom Van Schaik – drums

== Credits ==
=== Production ===
- Produced by Gurf Morlix & Robert Earl Keen
  - Recorded by Stuart Sullivan at Arlyn Studios, Austin, Texas
  - Mixed by Gurf Morlix at Arlyn Studios, Austin, Texas
  - Mastered by Hank Williams and Gurf Morlix at MasterMix, Nashville, Tennessee
- † "The Road Goes on Forever" produced by Ray Kennedy
  - Recorded by Ray Kennedy at Arlyn Studios, Austin, Texas
  - Additional recording at Room and Board Studios, Nashville, Tennessee
  - Mixed by Chuck Ainlay in BackStage at Sound Stage Studios, Nashville, Tennessee
  - Mastered by Hank Williams at MasterMix, Nashville, Tennessee

=== Management ===
- Management – Rosetta Management, Bandera, Texas
- Booking — Monterey Peninsula Artists, Inc.

=== Artwork ===
- Art direction — Robert Earl Keen, Jim Kemp & Karen Naff
- Design – Karen Naff
- Photography – Glen Rose

== Chart performance ==
Chart (2001)	Peak position
U.S. Billboard Top Heatseekers	1
U.S. Billboard 200	111
U.S. Billboard Top Country Albums	10
