= Rose Hotel =

Rose Hotel may refer to:

- Rose Hotel (Elizabethtown, Illinois), a historic hotel in Elizabethtown, Illinois
- Rose Hotel, Bunbury, a historic hotel in Bunbury, Western Australia

== See also ==
- The Rose Hotel, a 2009 album by Robert Earl Keen
- Hotel La Rose, Santa Rosa, California
- Hotel Rose, Portland, Oregon
