= Staypineapple =

American boutique hotel

- Formerly: Pineapple Hospitality
- Type: Private
- Industry: Hospitality
- Founded: 2010
- Headquarters: Kirkland, Washington, United States
- Area served: United States
- Parent: Columbia West Properties
- Website: staypineapple.com

Staypineapple, formerly known as Pineapple Hospitality, is an American boutique hotel chain headquartered in Kirkland, Washington.

== History ==
Staypineapple traces its roots to Columbia West Properties, a Bellevue-based real estate firm founded by the Barnet family in 1988. In 2008, Columbia West acquired two boutique hotels, the Watertown Hotel and the University Inn, in Seattle's University District. In 2010, Barnet formed Pineapple Hospitality as a hotel management company and opened The Maxwell Hotel near Seattle Center.

In 2011, Pineapple Hospitality acquired and renovated a former Ramada in downtown Seattle, reopening it as Hotel FIVE. By that point, the company operated four boutique hotels in the city.

In 2013, Pineapple Hospitality began expansion outside of Seattle and acquired Hotel Fifty in Portland, Oregon, later renamed as Hotel Rose. In 2015, Pineapple Hospitality entered Southern California with Hotel Z in San Diego's Gaslamp Quarter. Further expansion occurred with the acquisition of the historic Hotel Burnham in Chicago (2017), the Chandler Inn in Boston (2018), and the opening of a New York City property in 2019.

In 2018, Pineapple Hospitality renamed all of its hotels under the Staypineapple brand.

== Operations ==
Staypineapple is headquartered in Kirkland, Washington and previously operated as both a hotel owner and management company. Since 2023, it has shifted to third-party management and licensing. Between 2024 and 2025, two original Seattle properties were sold to outside investors while remaining under Staypineapple management.
