= Mark Cook =

Mark Cook may refer to:

- Mark Cook (footballer), English footballer
- Mark Cook (author), British sexologist
- Mark Cook, keyboardist with the band Daniel Amos

== See also ==
- Mark Cooke, American country music singer
