= Pedal Steal =

Pedal Steal / Rollback

Studio album by Terry Allen
- Released: 1988
- Recorded: 1985, 1988
- Genre: Country
- Label: Fate
- Producer: Terry Allen, Lloyd Maines, Don Caldwell, Richard Bowden

Terry Allen chronology
| Amerasia (1987) | Pedal Steal / Rollback (1988) | Silent Majority (Terry Allen's Greatest Missed Hits) (1993) |

Pedal Steal / Rollback is an album by Terry Allen released on his Fate label in 1988. The album combines two soundtracks commissioned for the Margaret Jenkins Dance Company in San Francisco -- "Pedal Steal" (1985) and "Rollback" (1988). "Pedal Steal" is loosely based on Wayne Gailey, a steel guitar player who wandered Texas and New Mexico in the late 1960s-early 1970s, and one of the first that Allen heard use the instrument for rock and roll.

Sugar Hill Records reissued "Pedal Steal" by itself on compact disc in 2006.

== Track listing ==
1. "Pedal Steel"
2. "Fenceline"
3. "Rodar Parar Atras"
4. "Rollback"
5. "Figure Ate"
6. "Home on the Range"
7. "Further Away"
8. "French Home"
