= Live at the Ryman: The Greatest Show Ever Been Gave =

Live album by Robert Earl Keen
- Released: July 11, 2006
- Genre: Alternative country
- Length: 69:08
- Label: Koch

Robert Earl Keen chronology
What I Really Mean (2005)	Live at the Ryman: The Greatest Show Ever Been Gave (2006)	Best (2006)

Professional ratings
Review scores
Source	Rating
Allmusic	link
PopMatters	4/10 link

Live at the Ryman: The Greatest Show Ever Been Gave is the fourth live album (and thirteenth overall) from Robert Earl Keen. The recording was released via Koch Records on July 11, 2006 in the United States and six days later in the United Kingdom.

A version of the recording was also released on DVD, and includes footage of the concert.

== Track listing ==
1. "Feelin' Good Again" – 3:15
2. "Gringo Honeymoon" – 4:56
3. "What I Really Mean" – 3:53
4. "Shades of Gray" – 5:01
5. "Amarillo Highway" (Terry Allen) – 2:48
6. "Merry Christmas from the Family" – 5:06
7. "Corpus Christi Bay" – 4:15
8. 'Furnace Fan" – 3:51
9. "Broken End of Love" – 3:18
10. "Long Chain" – 5:28
11. "Train Trek" – 6:01
12. "I'm Comin' Home" – 4:39
13. "The Road Goes On Forever" – 11:03
14. "Farm Fresh Onions" – 5:34
