= John T. Floore Country Store =

Music venue in Helotes, Texas

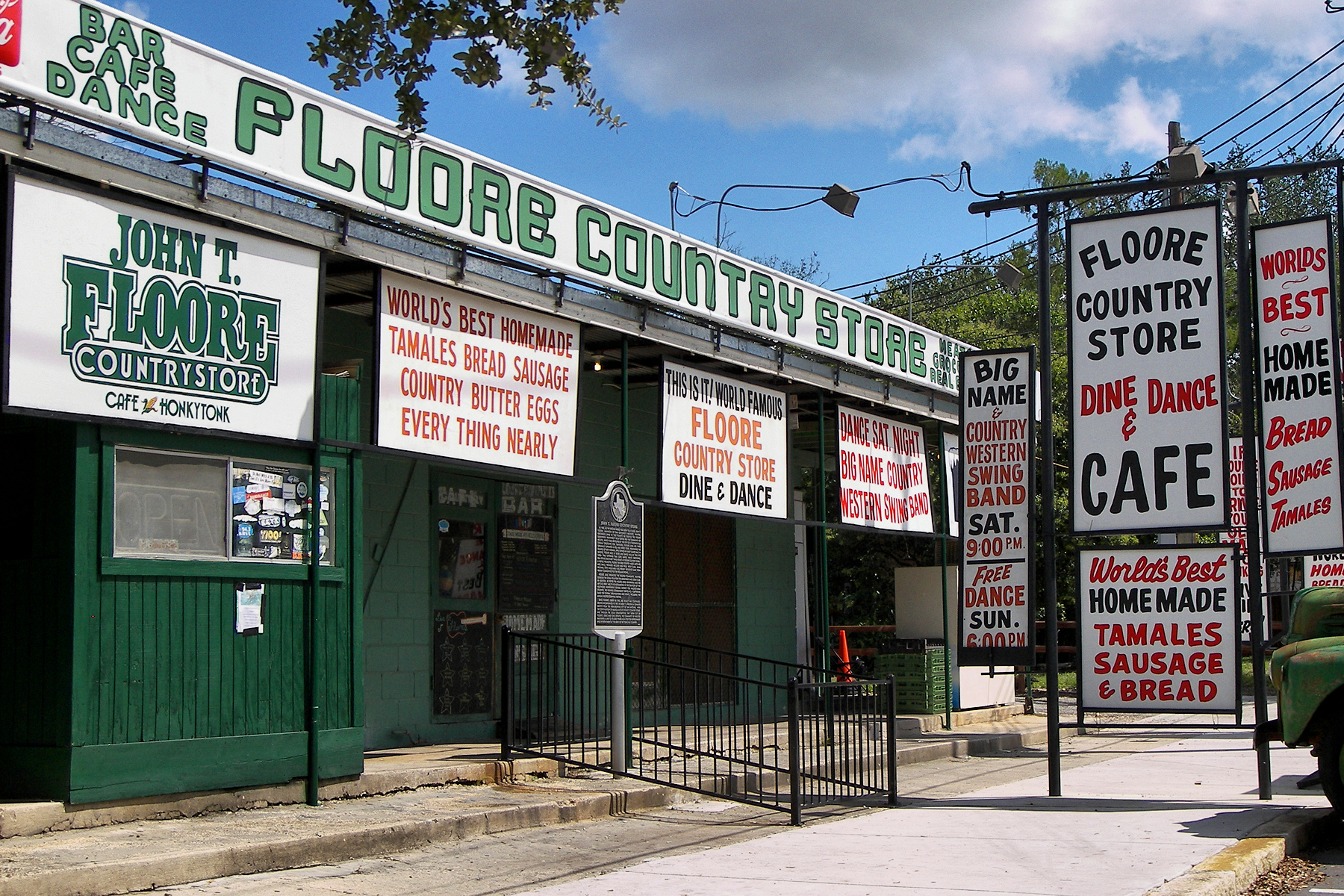
- Store as of 2012

- Location within Texas
- Address: 14492 Old Bandera Rd, Helotes, Texas 78023
- Coordinates: 29.577858°N 98.6905772°W

The John T. Floore Country Store (known colloquially as Floore's Country Store, or just Floore's) is a music venue and dance hall located in Helotes, Texas. The John T. Floore country store is notable for its association with various artists within Texas Country. The store is especially well known for its association with Willie Nelson, who performed at the store on a regular basis early in his career. In 2006, the store was listed on the National Register of Historic Places, indicating its significance. Floore's Country Store is renowned for its musical performances, and was nominated for "Nightclub of the Year" by the Academy of Country Music in 2006 and 2013.

== History ==
Floore's Country Store was opened by John T. Floore, former manager of the Majestic Theater in nearby San Antonio. Opened in 1942, the store was initially opened as a grocery store to cater to travelers between San Antonio and neighboring Bandera. However, Floore saw another opportunity. The Silver Spur Dance Hall in Helotes and The Cabaret Dance Hall in Bandera were prospering; Floore felt the addition of a new music venue would benefit travelers in the area. Floore was able to use experience gathered from his time spent at the Majestic Theater and book notable country artists. By the 1950s, the store was well established as a music venue and began to attract country music stars such as Ray Price, Bob Wills, Johnny Cash, and Ernest Tubb.

== Association with Willie Nelson ==
Floore's takes pride in its association with Willie Nelson, and claims to be his "musical birthplace". Willie Nelson and John T Floore established a relationship upon Nelson's return to Texas. Nelson had encountered difficulty in establishing a music career in Nashville, who according to Massey (2010), "didn't appreciate his different style of singing". Nelson and Floore entered into a professional relationship together: Floore would partner with the Willie Nelson Music Company, with the stipulation that Nelson perform at Floore's on a monthly basis. Consequently, The John T. Floore Country Store became closely associated with Nelson and his musical career. Nelson even mentions Floore by name in his single "Shotgun Willie" .

== Live albums ==
Several live albums were recorded at Floore's Country Store, including:

- "No. 2 Live Dinner (tracks 1-14) and Live Dinner Reunion" by Robert Earl Keen
- "Homemade Tamales (Live at Floore's)" by Randy Rogers Band
- "It All Happened Live In A Honky Tonk From Floore's Country Store" by Jon Wolfe
- "Live From Texas" By The Last Bandoleros
- "Live at Floore's Country Store" by Nathan Hamilton & No Deal

== In popular culture ==
Parts of the 1994 film 8 Seconds were filmed in the store.

Parts of the 1978 CBS network movie "Thaddeus Rose and Eddie" (featuring Johnny Cash) were filmed at Floore Country Store

A scene in the Leon Russell documentary A Poem is a Naked Person features Willie Nelson playing live at Floore Country Store

== See also ==
- Gruene Hall
- Luckenbach, Texas
