= Mark Cooke =

American singer-songwriter

- Born: January 11
- Origin: Longview, Texas, United States
- Genres: Country
- Occupation: Singer
- Instrument(s): Vocals, Guitar
- Labels: CVR
- Website: http://www.markcooke.com

Mark Cooke (born January 11) is an American country music singer from East Texas. His debut single, "Can't Cheat In A Small Town," was released in early 2011. It was followed by the release of his debut EP, Living For The Weekend, on September 28, 2011.

== Early life and career ==
Cooke always dreamed of becoming a country musician. But when he graduated high school, he chose to join the United States Navy. While at sea and around the world, Cooke worked on his vocal and writing skills. After he had fulfilled his duty with the Navy, he began his musical career.

Cooke later started the Cooke County Line band with future brother in law Joe Rodriquez. The seven-piece band played across Central Texas and neighboring states. During this period, Cooke opened for or played with many veteran acts including John Rich, George Jones, Miranda Lambert, Tracy Lawrence, Chris Cagle, Little Jimmy Dickens, Whispering Bill Anderson, David Lee Murphy, David Allan Coe, Robert Earl Keen, Ray Wiley Hubbard, Charlie Robison, Ty Herndon, Linda Davis and more. Eventually, he moved to Nashville to launch his solo career.

== Musical career ==
In 2010, Mark Cooke was signed by Nashville record label CVR run by veteran producers J Gary Smith and John Smith. Cooke's debut single "Can't Cheat In A Small Town" was on the Billboard Indicator chart in early 2011 and the music video was featured on CMT Pure.

Cooke's second single "I Love It" was released and hit the radio March 14, 2011 and is from his debut EP "Living For The Weekend." His current single "Any Way The Wind Blows" is now on the radio.

== Discography ==
=== Extended plays ===
Title	Details
Living for the Weekend	Release date: September 23, 2011; Label: CVR

=== Singles ===
Year	Single	Album
2011	"Can't Cheat in a Small Town"	Living for the Weekend
2011	"I Love It"	Living for the Weekend
2011	"Any Way the Wind Blows"	Living for the Weekend
2012	"Stay with Me Tonight"	Living for the Weekend

=== Music videos ===
Year	Video	Director
2010	"Can't Cheat in a Small Town"	Carelton Holt
2013	"Stay with Me Tonight"	Yeah Yeah Creative
