= The Live Album =

Live album by Robert Earl Keen
- Released: November 15, 1988
- Recorded: The Sons of Hermann Hall, Dallas, Texas
- Genre: Folk
- Length: 35:28
- Label: Sugar Hill
- Producer: Jim Rooney

Robert Earl Keen chronology
No Kinda Dancer (1984)	The Live Album (1988)	West Textures (1989)

Professional ratings
Review scores
Source	Rating
Allmusic	4.5/5 stars

The Live Album is a live album by Texas-based folk singer-songwriter Robert Earl Keen. It was recorded at the Sons of Hermann Hall in Dallas, TX, and released in 1988 on Sugar Hill.

== Track listing ==
All tracks written by Robert Earl Keen, except where noted

1. "I Wanna Know" (Robert Earl Keen, Fred Koller) – 2:46
2. "The Front Porch Song" (Robert Earl Keen, Lyle Lovett) – 6:29
3. "Goin' Down In Style" – 3:39
4. "If I Were King" – 2:51
5. "Copenhagen" – 2:08
6. "I Would Change My Life" – 2:43
7. "Stewball" (Traditional; arranged by Robert Earl Keen) – 2:38
8. "I'll Go On Downtown" – 3:52
9. "The Bluegrass Widow" – 6:10
10. "Who'll Be Looking Out For Me" – 2:12

== Personnel ==
In the liner notes, Keen dedicates this album with the simple line, "FOR MOM AND DAD."

=== Musicians ===
- Robert Earl Keen Jr. – vocals, acoustic guitar
- Jonathan Yudkin – fiddle, mandolin, acoustic guitar, and arrangements on "I Wanna Know", "I Would Change My Life", and "The Bluegrass Widow"
- Roy Huskey Jr. – upright bass
- Doug Hudson – harmony vocals on "I'll Go On Downtown"
- Randall Fields – M.C.

=== Production ===
- Produced by Jim Rooney
- Recorded live at The Sons of Hermann Hall in Dallas, Texas by Omega Audio
- Mixed by Mark Miller at Jack's Tracks in Nashville, Tennessee
- Mastered by Jim Loyd at Masterfonics, Nashville, Tennessee
- Design by Pat Johnson, Fayetteville, Texas
