= Live at the Ryman =

Live at the Ryman may refer to:

- Live at the Ryman: The Greatest Show Ever Been Gave, a 2006 album by Robert Earl Keen
- Live at the Ryman (Marty Stuart album), 2006
- Live at the Ryman (Brothers Osborne album), 2019
- Live at the Ryman, a 2017 album by Tommy Emmanuel

== See also ==
- At the Ryman, a 1992 live album by Emmylou Harris.
- Live from the Ryman, a 2023 live album by Charley Crockett.
