= Picnic (album) =

Studio album by Robert Earl Keen
- Released: April 29, 1997
- Genre: Folk, country
- Length: 44:10
- Label: Arista
- Producer: John Keane

Robert Earl Keen chronology
No. 2 Live Dinner (1996)	Picnic (1997)	Walking Distance (1998)

Professional ratings
Review scores
Source	Rating
AllMusic	4/5 stars
Entertainment Weekly	B+

Picnic is an album by the Texas-based folk singer-songwriter Robert Earl Keen, released in 1997. It was his first album for Arista Records. The album is dedicated to Townes Van Zandt.

== Critical reception ==
Entertainment Weekly wrote that "Keen’s vivid scenarios in Picnic pack more punch than the usual Austin twang and bang."

== Track listing ==
All tracks written by Robert Earl Keen, except where noted

1. "Undone" – 3:47
2. "Over the Waterfall" – 4:30
3. "Levelland" (James McMurtry) – 5:11
4. "I Wonder Where My Baby Is Tonight" – 4:08
5. "Oh Rosie" – 5:23
6. "Runnin' with the Night" – 4:15
7. "The Coming Home of the Son and Brother" (J. D. Hutchison) – 3:53
8. "Shades of Gray" – 5:07
9. "Fourth of July" (Dave Alvin) – 3:59
10. "Then Came Lo Mein" – 3:57

== Personnel ==
- Nancy Blake – cello (track 10)
- Rich Brotherton – electric guitar (tracks 2, 3, 7), backing vocals (track 3), acoustic guitar (tracks: 1 to 5, 7)
- John Keane – steel guitar (tracks 4, 5, 7), mandolin (track 1), keyboards (tracks 2, 10), electric guitar (tracks 1, 3, 9), bass (tracks 6, 10), backing vocals (track 9), acoustic guitar (tracks 3, 6, 8, 10)
- Gurf Morlix – electric guitar (tracks 3, 5, 6, 9)
- Joel Morris – drums (tracks 3, 6, 9)
- Tim O'Brien – mandolin (tracks 2, 4, 8)
- Mark Thomas Patterson – drums (tracks 1, 2, 4, 5, 7, 8)
- Dave Schools – bass guitar (track 9)
- Margo Timmins – vocals (track 10), backing vocals (tracks 4, 7)
- Bill Whitbeck – bass guitar (tracks 1, 2, 4, 5, 7, 8), backing vocals (tracks 1, 2, 5)
- Tim White – organ (track 9), keyboards (track 3), accordion (track 6)
- Robert Earl Keen – vocals (tracks 1 to 10), acoustic guitar (tracks 1 to 10)
