= Lubbock (On Everything) =

Studio album by Terry Allen
- Released: 1979
- Recorded: Caldwell Studios; Lubbock, Texas
- Genre: Country rock; outlaw country; Texas country
- Length: 78:55
- Label: Fate; Sugar Hill
- Producer: Don Caldwell; Lloyd Maines; "Everyone on this record"

Terry Allen chronology
Juarez (1975)	Lubbock (On Everything) (1979)	Smokin' the Dummy (1980)

Professional ratings
Review scores
Source	Rating
AllMusic	4.5/5 stars
Christgau's Record Guide	A−
fRoots	(not rated)
MusicHound Folk: The Essential Album Guide	4/5 stars

Lubbock (On Everything) is a 1979 double album by Texas singer, songwriter and piano player Terry Allen, released on Fate Records. It was reissued on compact disc in 1995 by Sugar Hill Records. and reissued again on CD and LP in October 2016 by Paradise of Bachelors. The 2016 LP reissue comes with a high quality 28 page LP booklet.

It was recorded in 1978 at Caldwell Studios in Lubbock, Texas, and was engineered and mastered by Don Caldwell and Lloyd Maines, who also played pedal steel and other instruments on the record. "Amarillo Highway" was later covered by Robert Earl Keen, and "Truckload Of Art" by Cracker. Little Feat released a version of "New Delhi Freight Train" on their 1977 album, Time Loves a Hero – two years before Terry Allen recorded it for the Lubbock (On Everything) album. Don Caldwell (Engineer/Saxophone) died in 2024, with Terry Allen notating at Caldwell's memorial service that "The Only Mountain In Lubbock, TX" was Caldwell Studios, due to the flagship sound quality and engineering style.

== Track listing ==
All songs written by Terry Allen

1. "Amarillo Highway (for Dave Hickey)"
2. "Highplains Jamboree"
3. "The Great Joe Bob (A Regional Tragedy)"
4. "The Wolfman of Del Rio"
5. "Lubbock Woman"
6. "The Girl Who Danced Oklahoma"
7. "Truckload of Art"
8. "The Collector (and the Art Mob)"
9. "Oui (a French Song)"
10. "Rendevouz USA"
11. "Cocktails for Three"
12. "The Beautiful Waitress"
13. "High Horse Momma"
14. "Blue Asian Reds (for Roadrunner)"
15. "New Delhi Freight Train"
16. "FFA"
17. "Flatland Farmer"
18. "My Amigo"
19. "The Pink and Black Song"
20. "The Thirty Years Waltz (for Jo Harvey)"
21. "I Just Left Myself"

== Personnel ==
- Terry Allen - piano, vocals
- Lloyd Maines - pedal steel, guitars, dobro, mandolin, banjo, bell tree, harmony vocals
- Kenny Maines - bass, harmony vocals
- Curtis McBride - drums
- Allan Shinn - percussion, marimba, jawbone, skin castanets
- Richard Bowden - fiddle
- Ponty Bone - accordion
- Don Caldwell - saxophone, string arrangements
- Joe Ely - harmonica
- Luis Martinez - jazz guitar (on "Cocktails for Three")
- Jesse Taylor - "flatland guitar" (on "Flatland Farmer")
- Tommie Anderson - trumpet
- Mark Anthony - trombone
- Russ Standefer - tuba
- Ruth Ann Truncale - violin
- Susan Allen - violin
- Karen Blalack - cello
- Leslie Blackburn - viola
- Monterey High School Marching Band - school song
- Sylvester "band-aid" Rice, Gwen Hewitt, Suzanne Paulk, Jo Harvey Allen - harmony vocals
- Freddy Pride, Mike Austin, Vincent Thomas, Jimmy Sampson - "whooooit" harmony
