= Leo Kottke Live =

Live

Live album by Leo Kottke
- Released: October 1995
- Recorded: April 1995
- Venues: Fox Theater, Boulder, CO
- Length: 60:02
- Labels: On The Spot, Private Music (0100582132-2)
- Producers: Leo Kottke, Paul duGre

Leo Kottke chronology
Peculiaroso (1994)	Live (1995)	The Leo Kottke Anthology (1997)

Live is a live album by American guitarist Leo Kottke, released in 1995. It includes two of Kottke's signature monologues ("Combat", "Roy Autry"), giving a small taste of the complete concert experience. A previously unreleased song "Flattened Brain" is also included.

== Reception ==
Professional ratings
Review scores
Source	Rating
AllMusic	4/5 stars
Encyclopedia of Popular Music	3/5 stars

Writing for AllMusic, music critic Murrday Fisher wrote of the album "... as is characteristic of his style, it's his instrumental work on cuts like "Peg Leg," "Little Martha," and a mellow version of the old classic "Twilight Time" that show the artist in peak form... Definitely recommended."

== Track listing ==
All songs by Leo Kottke except as noted.

1. "William Powell" – 5:32
2. "The Room at the Top of the Stairs" (Randall Hylton) – 2:47
3. "Airproofing" – 4:50
4. "Jack Gets Up" – 4:49
5. "Combat" - 6:05
6. "Peg Leg" – 2:21
7. "Twilight Time" (Buck Ram, Morty Nevins, Al Nevins) – 2:27
8. "Bean Time" – 1:40
9. "Roy Autry" – 6:25
10. "Parade" – 4:11
11. "I Yell at Traffic" – 5:40
12. "Flattened Brain" – 3:45
13. "Little Martha" (Duane Allman) – 2:04
14. "Oddball" – 3:18
15. "Arms of Mary" (Ian Sutherland) – 4:08

Many of the track timings are incorrect—here and on the actual album. The most egregious example is "Roy Autry," which is only 0:49, not 6:25. The total album time is 53:14, not 60:02.

== Personnel ==
- Leo Kottke - acoustic guitar, vocals

Production notes:

- Produced by Leo Kottke & Paul duGre
