= The Rose Hotel =

Studio album by Robert Earl Keen
- Released: September 29, 2009
- Genre: Folk
- Length: 48:06
- Label: Lost Highway
- Producer: Lloyd Maines

Robert Earl Keen chronology
Marfa After Dark (2008)	The Rose Hotel (2009)	Ready for Confetti (2011)

Professional ratings
Review scores
Source	Rating
Allmusic	2.5/5 stars

The Rose Hotel is an album by American folk music artist Robert Earl Keen. It was released on September 29, 2009 by Lost Highway Records. The album peaked at number 17 on the Billboard Top Country Albums chart.

== Track listing ==
All songs written by Robert Earl Keen except where noted.

1. "The Rose Hotel" – 3:47
2. "Flyin' Shoes" (Townes Van Zandt) – 4:00
3. "Throwin' Rocks" – 5:49
4. "10,000 Chinese Walk Into a Bar" – 4:17
5. "Something I Do" – 4:17
6. "The Man Behind the Drums" (Keen, Bill Whitbeck) – 4:00
7. "Goodbye Cleveland" (Keen, Whitbeck) – 4:29
8. "Laughing River" (Greg Brown) – 4:25
9. "On and On" – 4:37
10. "Village Inn" – 3:51
11. "Wireless in Heaven" – 4:34

== Chart performance ==
Chart (2009)	Peak position
U.S. Billboard Top Country Albums	17
U.S. Billboard Rock Albums	35
U.S. Billboard 200	83
