= Standing in My Shoes =

Standing In My Shoes

Studio album by Leo Kottke
- Released: May 20, 1997
- Recorded: Woodland Digital, Nashville, Tennessee
- Length: 38:57
- Label: Private Music (0100582146-2)
- Producer: David Z

Leo Kottke chronology
The Leo Kottke Anthology (1997)	Standing In My Shoes (1997)	One Guitar, No Vocals (1999)

Standing In My Shoes is an album by American guitarist Leo Kottke, released in 1997. It is an eclectic mix of traditional and contemporary music which surprised a few of Kottke's long-time fans.

Kottke's cover version of Fleetwood Mac's "World Turning" appeared on The Drew Carey Show. Chet Atkins guests on lead guitar on "Twice".

== Reception ==
Professional ratings
Review scores
Source	Rating
AllMusic	3/5 stars
Salon.com	(no rating)
Encyclopedia of Popular Music	4/5 stars

Writing for AllMusic, music critic Stephen Erlewine wrote of the album "... Kottke comes up with one of his most unusual records with Standing in My Shoes... His solos are loose and swinging, and even his trio of vocal numbers have a charming, carefree quality. Standing in My Shoes does bog down occasionally, particularly when the execution is more compelling than the material, but on the whole, it is one of his more fascinating records of the '90s. In his review for Salon.com, critic Gary Kamiya wrote: "Like a ragtime pianist, he has the kind of impeccable ability to play different lines simultaneously that almost requires a split brain. The man's right hand should be preserved for science... It's all very solid and unobjectionable, though a bit short on the sublime moments that Kottke at his best can attain... "Standing In My Shoes" isn't groundbreaking, but it's a pleasant excursion into new territory for a first-rate instrumentalist."

== Track listing ==
All songs by Leo Kottke except as noted.

1. "Standing in My Shoes" (Leo Kottke, Denny Bruce)
2. "World Turning" (Christine McVie, Lindsey Buckingham)
3. "Dead End"
4. "Vaseline Machine Gun"
5. "Corrina, Corrina" (Traditional)
6. "Realm"
7. "Cripple Creek" (Traditional)
8. "Twice"
9. "Across the Street"
10. "Don't Call Me Ray" (Leo Kottke, Steve Wariner)
11. "Itchy"

== Personnel ==
- Leo Kottke - 6 & 12-string guitar, sitar, vocals
- David Smith - bass
- Greg Morrow - drums and percussion
- Reese Wynans - organ
- Kim Parent - background vocals
- Chet Atkins - lead guitar on "Twice"
- David Z - drum programming, sitar, celeste

== Production notes ==
- Produced and engineered by David Z
- Assistant engineers: Sandy Jenkins, Amy Hughes, Rich Cohen
- Edited by Frank Green
- Mastered by George Marino
