= Juarez (album) =

Studio album by Terry Allen
- Released: 1975
- Genre: Country
- Label: Sugar Hill
- Producer: Jamie Howell, Terry Allen

Terry Allen chronology
Juarez (1975)	Lubbock (On Everything) (1979)

Professional ratings
Review scores
Source	Rating
Christgau's Record Guide	C+
Pitchfork Media	8.0/10

Juarez is the debut album by Terry Allen. It was released in 1975. The album was reissued on compact disc by Sugar Hill Records.

== Track listing ==
All tracks composed by Terry Allen

1. "The Juarez Device" (aka "Texican Badman")
2. "The Characters/ A Simple Story"
3. "Cortez Sail"
4. "Border Palace"
5. "Dogwood"
6. "Writing On Rocks Across The USA"
7. "The Radio...And Real Life"
8. "There Oughta Be a Law Against Sunny Southern California"
9. "What of Alicia"
10. "Honeymoon in Cortez"
11. "Four Corners"
12. "The Run South"
13. "Jabo/Street Walkin' Woman"
14. "Cantina Carlotta"
15. "La Despedida (The Parting)"
16. "El Camino Instrumental"
17. "El Camino"

== Personnel ==
- Terry Allen - vocals, piano, maracas
- Peter Kaukonen - guitar, mandolin
- Greg Douglass - guitar
- Diane Harris, Peter Kaukonen - vocals
