= Amerasia (album) =

Studio album by Terry Allen
- Released: 1987
- Studios: Caldwell Studios, 722 Studios
- Genre: Country
- Labels: Fate Records, Sugar Hill
- Producers: Terry Allen, Lloyd Maines

Terry Allen chronology
Bloodlines (1983)	Amerasia (1987)	Pedal Steal (1988)

Amerasia is an album by the artist Terry Allen, recorded with the Thai folk-rock band Caravan, released in 1987 by Fate Records and reissued by Sugar Hill Records. It is the soundtrack to the 1985 film Amerasia by Wolf-Eckart Buhler. The album's liner notes were written by David Byrne.

== Track listing ==
All tracks composed by Terry Allen

1. "Amerasia"
2. "My Country 'Tis of Thee"
3. "The Burden"
4. "Back Out of the World"
5. "Swanlake"***
6. "Display Woman/Displaced Man"
7. "Lucy's Tiger Den"
8. "Nobody's Goin' Home (Friendship Highway)"
9. "Metrapab"***
10. "Church Walking"
11. "Food Stall'
12. "Cana"
13. "Sawahdi (Christmas Song)"
14. "Orphans"***
15. "Pataya"***
16. "Let Freedom Ring"***
- Tracks 5, 9 and 14-16 recorded with Caravan in Bangkok, Thailand.
