= No. 2 Live Dinner =

No. 2 LIVE Dinner

Live album by Robert Earl Keen
- Released: March 19, 1996
- Recorded: August 12, 1995, Helotes, Texas & October 8, 1995, Austin, Texas
- Genres: Folk; country
- Length: 67:14
- Label: Sugar Hill
- Producer: Lloyd Maines

Robert Earl Keen chronology
Gringo Honeymoon (1994)	No. 2 LIVE Dinner (1996)	Picnic (1997)

Professional ratings
Review scores
Source	Rating
Allmusic	link
Entertainment Weekly	B link

No. 2 LIVE Dinner is an album of live music by Texas-based folk singer-songwriter Robert Earl Keen, released in the United States on March 19, 1996. It was his last live album for Sugar Hill Records, a label he had been with since 1984. After that album's release, Robert Earl Keen left for Arista Records in 1997. The performances are from two different dates, the first fourteen tracks (11 songs, described as "Dinner" in the CD Liner notes) were recorded at the John T. Floore Country Store in Helotes, TX on August 12, 1995. Tracks fifteen through seventeen (2 songs, described as "Dessert") were recorded at Cactus Cafe Ballroom in Austin, TX on October 8 of the same year.

== Track listing ==
All tracks written by Robert Earl Keen, except where noted

1. "Intro" – :33
2. "I'm Going to Town" (Robert Earl Keen, Fred Koller) – 2:36
3. "Gringo Honeymoon" – 5:02
4. "Merry Christmas from the Family" – 3:55
5. "Five Pound Bass" – 4:04
6. Band Intro – 1:29
7. "Rollin' By" – 4:04
8. "Sonora's Death Row" (Kevin Farrell) – 4:56
9. "When The Bluebonnets Bloom" (Robert Earl Keen, Fred Koller) – 1:57
10. "Think It Over One Time" – 3:29
11. "Amarillo Highway" (Terry Allen) – 2:51
12. The Road Intro – 5:07
13. "The Road Goes on Forever" – 8:31
14. "Dreadful Selfish Crime" – 7:19
15. Mariano Intro – 2:50
16. "Mariano" – 4:07
17. "I'm Comin' Home" – 4:24
