= Salivation (album) =

Studio album by Terry Allen
- Released: 1999
- Studio: Cedar Creek Studios, Austin, Texas
- Genre: Country
- Label: Sugar Hill
- Producer: Lloyd Maines, Terry Allen

Terry Allen chronology
Human Remains (1996)	Salivation (1999)	Live at Al's Grand Hotel May 7th 1971 (2011)

Salivation is an album by the American musician and artist Terry Allen. It was released in 1999 on Sugar Hill Records. The album's title is a play on the word salvation, and contains an image of a smiling Jesus Christ on the cover.

== Production ==
The album was recorded at Cedar Creek Studios, in Austin, Texas.

== Critical reception ==
Professional ratings
Review scores
Source	Rating
AllMusic	4/5 stars
Robert Christgau	(3-star Honorable Mention)
Spin	7/10

The Dallas Observer wrote: "A seamless commentary on hypocrisy, spirituality, society, family, and individuality, Salivation is neither heavy nor light." Style Weekly thought that Allen "mixes Texas folk and rock, Middle Eastern textures, hoe-down swing and plaintive ballads into a fine set of tunes for those looking for the left-of-center."

The Independent noted that "to a tuba-bass cakewalk reminiscent of Ry Cooder, 'Southern Comfort' offers a reminder, Southern state by Southern state, of racist dues to be paid come Judgement Day."

AllMusic wrote that "between note one and the dying echo, the record stomps, smokes, snorts, and acts generally loutish and obnoxious, which makes for a wonderfully entertaining experience."

== Track listing ==
All tracks composed by Terry Allen; except where indicated

1. "Salivation"
2. "The Doll" (Terry Allen, Lloyd Maines)
3. "Billy the Boy ("Pedal Steal" Medley)"
4. "Southern Comfort"
5. "Rio Ticino"
6. "Red Leg Boy"
7. "Cortez Sail"
8. "Xmas on the Isthmus" (Terry Allen, Guy Clark)
9. "Ain't No Top 40 Song"
10. "The Show"
11. "Give Me the Flowers" (Elvin Bigger, Gladys Stacey Flatt, Louise Certain)
