= Merry Christmas from the Family =

Song by Robert Earl Keen

from the album Gringo Honeymoon
- Released: 1994
- Recorded: 1994
- Genre: Holiday song, alternative country
- Songwriter: Robert Earl Keen

'"Merry Christmas from the Family" is a holiday song written by alternative country artist Robert Earl Keen. The song was first recorded for Keen's 1994 album, Gringo Honeymoon. A live version also appears on his 1996, No. 2 Live Dinner. The popularity of the song led Keen to write a sequel song, "Happy Holidays Y'all", for his 1998 album Walking Distance, and to publish a book, Merry Christmas from the Family, in 2001. The original song, the book, and the sequel all center around the same cast of characters in Keen's humorous vision of a Texas style Christmas.

== The song ==
Growing up in Houston, Texas, Robert Earl Keen didn't often see snow at Christmas time. He says "I didn't even know what a chestnut looked like until I was 30 years old and saw it in a picture book… It was a different kind of Christmas. Every Christmas song I had ever heard didn't have a lot to do with growing up in Houston where it was most likely 85 degrees and 95 percent humidity."

"Merry Christmas from the Family" describes the Christmas gathering of a fairly dysfunctional Texas family whose merrymaking—that includes drinking alcohol, carving a turkey, watching a televised ball game and smoking cigarettes—seems to be punctuated with Christmas music and the need to run to convenience stores for additional supplies such as fake snow and more cigarettes. Various family members and events are described throughout the verses. Nobody is sure how to react to a younger sister bringing her Mexican boyfriend to the party, but as soon as he sings "Feliz Navidad", he is welcomed into the fold. Brother Ken arrives with five children from two of his previous marriages. Ken's new wife, Kay, chain smokes and "talks all about AA". Extended family also appear. Fred and Rita, whose relationship to the narrator appears to have been forgotten, arrive from Harlingen in a motor home, which when plugged in, overloads the electrical system and knocks out the family's Christmas lights. The family then waits on the front lawn and joins together in singing "Silent Night" when cousin David flips the breaker that brings the lights back on.

=== The "Linen Rule" ===
Keen calls the song the "Rocky Horror Picture Show of Christmas songs" saying that whether singing before a group of 1,000 or 6,000, the entire audience sings along, and in particular shouts out the line, "Mix Bloody Marys 'cause we all want one."

Due to the immense popularity of the song among Robert Earl Keen's fans, as well as its seasonal nature, he had to create restrictions limiting the time of year during which his band will play the song:

"Well, it's a real popular song with us, I have nine records out and this song just sort of cropped up and became a real favorite and we get requests for it all year round. So, I had to create this rule, I call it the 'Linen Rule', where we don't play the song as long as you can wear linen. So it saves it and makes it fresh for the holiday season. So we start playing it around Labor Day and we play it on through the holidays. It's the big number particularly in December that we close with." –Robert Earl Keen

=== Covers ===
Cover versions of the song have been performed and recorded by artists including Jill Sobule, Rosie O'Donnell with the Dixie Chicks, and Montgomery Gentry. Montgomery Gentry's version, the B-side of their 2000 single "All Night Long", peaked at No. 38 on Billboard's 75 Hot Country Songs airplay list during its four-week chart run in December 2000 and early January 2001.

== Sequel ==
Keen's 1998 album, Walking Distance included a sequel, "Happy Holidays Y'all". Keen states, "I vowed when I really started writing songs that I'd never write a sequel. But I thought, well, you know, why not."

According to Keen, the second song fills in some of the gaps on the characters and brings them a little further along into their holiday celebration: "The song 'Merry Christmas from the Family' is set in the present tense. This song is set in the present tense, but little further in the future—say like after the party when everybody's packing up and leaving on the 26th of December."
