= Gringo Honeymoon =

Studio album by Robert Earl Keen
- Released: August 10, 1994
- Genre: Folk, alt.country
- Length: 53:04
- Label: Sugar Hill
- Producer: Garry Velletri

Robert Earl Keen chronology
A Bigger Piece Of Sky (1993)	Gringo Honeymoon (1994)	No. 2 Live Dinner (1996)

Professional ratings
Review scores
Source	Rating
Allmusic	3/5 stars

Gringo Honeymoon is an album by Texas-based country and folk singer-songwriter Robert Earl Keen released in the United States in August 1994 on Sugar Hill Records.

The title track tells of the singer and his wife crossing the Rio Grande in Big Bend National Park, Texas, to have an eventful visit in the small Mexican town of Boquillas del Carmen located in the state of Coahuila.

Gillian Welch provided backing vocals in her first non-demo professional recording session.

== Track listing ==
All tracks written by Robert Earl Keen, except where noted:

1. "Think It Over One Time" – 3:50
2. "Tom Ames' Prayer" (Steve Earle) – 3:23
3. "Gringo Honeymoon" – 5:19
4. "The Raven And The Coyote" – 5:12
5. "Lonely Feeling" – 8:30
6. "Merry Christmas from the Family" – 4:45
7. "Barbeque" – 4:41
8. "Lynnville Train" (Robert Earl Keen, LeRoy Preston) – 5:03
9. "I'm Comin' Home" – 3:47
10. "Dreadful Selfish Crime" – 8:17

== Production ==
- Produced By Garry Velletri
- Engineers: Jeff Coppage
- Assistant Engineers: Brad Jones
- Mixing: Roger Moutenot
- Mastering: Randy LeRoy

== Personnel ==
- Jeff Coppage, Dennis Locorriere, Rebecca Stout, Gillian Welch - backing vocals
- Rich Brotherton, George Marinelli, Gurf Morlix - guitars
- Tommy Spurlock - steel & pedal steel
- Brad Jones - organ, piano, percussion
- Garry Tallent - bass
- David Heath - upright bass, backing vocals
- Bryan Duckworth - fiddle, backing vocals
- Jonathan Yudkin - violin
- Dave Durocher, Mark Patterson - drums
- Sam Bacco - percussion
