= Silent Majority (Terry Allen's Greatest Missed Hits) =

Compilation album by Terry Allen
- Released: 1992
- Genre: Country
- Label: Fate Records, Sugar Hill
- Producer: Lloyd Maines, Terry Allen

Terry Allen chronology
Amerasia (1987)	Silent Majority (Terry Allen's Greatest Missed Hits) (1992)	Human Remains (1996)

Professional ratings
Review scores
Source	Rating
Rolling Stone	4/5 stars

Silent Majority (Terry Allen's Greatest Missed Hits) is an album by artist Terry Allen in 1992. The liner notes describe the album as follows: “It is a compilation of out-takes, in-takes, mis-takes, work tapes, added tos, taken froms, omissions and foreign materials.” The album was originally released by Fate Records, and has since been reissued by Sugar Hill Records.

== Track listing ==
All tracks composed by Terry Allen; except where indicated

1. "Advice to Children"
2. "Yo Ho Ho"
3. "Home on the Range"
4. "I Love Germany"
5. "Burden"
6. "Big Ol' White Boys"
7. "Arizona Spiritual"
8. "Oh Tired Feet"
9. "Rollback"
10. "Cocktail Desperado" (music: Terry Allen; lyrics: David Byrne)
11. "3 Finger Blues"
12. "Oh Mom"
13. "High Horse Momma"
14. "New Delhi Freight Train"
15. "Loneliness (Rockin' by Momma Lonesome Rose Lonely Road)"
16. "Heart's Road"
