= A Bigger Piece of Sky =

Studio album by Robert Earl Keen
- Released: October 8, 1993; August 10, 2004 Re-Release
- Recorded: Nashville, TN, US; July 1992
- Genre: Folk; Alternative country
- Length: 39:39
- Label: Sugar Hill; KOCH Re-Release
- Producer: Garry Velletri

Robert Earl Keen chronology
West Textures (1989)	A Bigger Piece of Sky (1993)	Gringo Honeymoon (1994)

Professional ratings
Review scores
Source	Rating
About.com	link
Allmusic	link
Austin Chronicle	(favorable) link
PopMatters	(favorable) link

A Bigger Piece of Sky is an album by Texas-based folk singer-songwriter Robert Earl Keen. It was released in the United States in 1993 by Sugar Hill Records and re-released in SACD format with the originally intended track sequencing in 2004 by Koch Records. The title of the album comes from a line in the opening verse of "Paint the Town Beige":

I gave up the fast lane for a blacktop country road
Just burned out on all that talk about the mother lode,
I traded for a songbird and a bigger piece of sky
When I miss the good old days I can't imagine why.

The album is frequently cited to be one of Keen's best if not the best and is considered to be a transitional point in his career as an artist. The album brings together various elements of alternative country such as roots-rock, honky tonk, and folk to form Keen's own cohesive blend of Texas music. Reviewers cite "Corpus Christi Bay", "Whenever Kindness Fails", "So I Can Take My Rest", and "Paint the Town Beige" as stand-out tracks. Keen's down-beat duet with Irish singer Maura O'Connell, "Night Right for Love" is also worthy of note as is Keen's cover of Terry Allen's "Amarillo Highway". Other guest performers include Marty Stuart on mandolin and Garry Tallent on electric and upright bass.

== Track listing ==
All tracks are written by Robert Earl Keen, except where noted

No.	Title	Writer(s)	Length
1.	"So I Can Take My Rest"		3:21
2.	"Whenever Kindness Fails"		3:35
3.	"Amarillo Highway"	Terry Allen	2:26
4.	"Night Right for Love"	Keen, Greg Trooper	4:16
5.	"Jesse With the Long Hair Hanging Down"		3:46
6.	"Blow You Away"		3:35
7.	"Here in Arkansas"		4:45
8.	"Daddy Had a Buick"		2:57
9.	"Corpus Christi Bay"		3:58
10.	"Crazy Cowboy Dream"		2:27
11.	"Paint the Town Beige"		4:33

2004 Re-Release Sequence
No.	Title	Writer(s)	Length
1.	"Amarillo Highway"	Terry Allen	2:26
2.	"Corpus Christi Bay"		3:58
3.	"Whenever Kindness Fails"		3:35
4.	"Blow You Away"		3:35
5.	"Jesse With the Long Hair Hanging Down"		3:46
6.	"Night Right for Love"	Keen, Greg Trooper	4:16
7.	"Paint The Town Beige"		4:33
8.	"Daddy Had a Buick"		2:57
9.	"Crazy Cowboy Dream"		2:27
10.	"Here in Arkansas"		4:45
11.	"So I Can Take My Rest"		3:21
12.	"Blow You Away" (reprise)		1:14

== Personnel ==
Musicians:

- Robert Earl Keen – lead vocals and acoustic guitar
- George Marinelli – harmony vocal on "Paint the Town Beige", and electric guitar
- Tommy Spurlock – acoustic guitar, steel, lap steel, and gut string guitar
- Garry Tallent – Electric bass and Upright bass
- Dave Durocher – harmony vocal on "Corpus Christi Bay", drums and percussion
- Jonathan Yudkin – violin
- Marty Stuart – mandolin
- Jay Spell – accordion
- Michael Snow – additional vocals on "Blow You Away", bodhran, and tenor banjo
- Bryan Duckworth – violin on "Crazy Cowboy Dream"
- Dave Heath – upright bass on "Crazy Cowboy Dream" and harmony vocals on "Jesse", "Amarillo Highway", and "Crazy Cowboy Dream"
- Maura O'Connell – duet vocal on "Night Right for Love", harmony vocal on "So I Can Take My Rest", and additional vocal on "Blow You Away"
- Jennifer Prince – harmony vocal on "So I Can Take My Rest"

Production:

- Produced – Garry Velletri (except "Amarillo Highway" by Garry Velletri and Dave Durocher)
- Recorded – Jeff Coppage, July 1992 at The Board Room, Nashville, Tennessee
- Mixed – Jeff Coppage and Garry Velletri
- Digital editing – Neal Merrick at Merrick Music Studios
- Mastered – Denny Purcell at Georgetown Masters

Artwork:

- Cover – "Slow Poke" by Ray C. Strang
- Back Cover – photo by Peter Figan
- Design – Diane Painter
