= Essential Leo Kottke =

Essential

Greatest hits album by Leo Kottke
- Released: 1991
- Recorded: 1976–1983
- Genre: Folk, Americana, new acoustic, American primitive guitar
- Length: 66:54
- Label: Chrysalis
- Producer: Denny Bruce, T-Bone Burnett, Kenny Buttrey, Leo Kottke

Leo Kottke chronology
Great Big Boy (1991)	Essential (1991)	Peculiaroso (1994)

Essential is a compilation of American guitarist Leo Kottke's releases on the Chrysalis label, released in 1991. It includes liner notes by Fred Goodman.

A number of compilations have been made of Kottke's music by his various record labels. Capitol had previously released 1971-1976 and The Best. The Rhino box set release Anthology covers the first 15 years of Kottke's career and includes selections from the Takoma, Capitol, and Chrysalis releases along with extensive liner notes. Capitol later released another compilation package titled The Best of Leo Kottke.

Professional ratings
Review scores
Source	Rating
AllMusic	4.5/5 stars
Encyclopedia of Popular Music	4/5 stars

== Track listing ==
- All songs by Leo Kottke except as noted.
- All tracks are excerpted from Leo Kottke, Burnt Lips, Balance, Guitar Music, and Time Step.
- The version of "Airproofing" represented here is the original, not the later extended version.
1. "Up Tempo" – 1:40
2. "Embryonic Journey" (Jorma Kaukonen) – 3:17
3. "Rings" (Eddie Reeves. Alex Harvey) – 2:55
4. "Mr. Fonebone" – 2:05
5. "Julie's House" – 3:27
6. "Side One Suite:"
  1. "Some Birds" – 0:59
  2. "Sounds Like..." – 1:28
  3. "Slang" – 2:42
  4. "My Double" – 2:05
  5. "Three Walls and Bars" – 2:13
  6. "Reprise: Some Birds" – :59
7. "Sonora's Death Row" (Kevin Blackie Farrell) – 4:30
8. "Learning the Game" (Buddy Holly) – 4:07
9. "The White Ape" – 2:10
10. "Buckaroo" (Bob Morris) – 2:03
11. "Tell Mary" – 3:04
12. "Airproofing" – 2:15
13. "Part Two" – 1:44
14. "Agile N." – 1:45
15. "Tumbling Tumbleweeds" (Bob Nolan) – 2:42
16. "Sleep Walk" (Johnny Farina, Santo Farina, Ann Farina) – 2:23
17. "The Credits: Out-takes from Terry's Movie" – 3:46
18. "Little Shoes" – 1:32
19. "The Train and the Gate: From Terry's Movie" – 3:18
20. "All I Have To Do Is Dream" (Boudleaux Bryant) – 1:42
21. "Frank Forgets" – 2:09
22. "Here Comes That Rainbow Again" (Kris Kristofferson) – 3:50

== Personnel ==
- Leo Kottke - 6 & 12-string guitar, vocals
- David Kemper - drums
- David Miner - bass
- Emmylou Harris - background vocals
- Kenny Buttrey - drums
- Mike Leech - bass
- Bobby Ogdin - piano
- John Harris - piano
