= The Leo Kottke Anthology =

Compilation album by Leo Kottke
- Released: May 5, 1997
- Recorded: 1969–1983
- Genre: Folk, new acoustic, American primitive guitar
- Length: 124:34
- Label: Rhino (R2 72585/72438 19111 29)
- Producer: Denny Bruce, John Fahey

Leo Kottke chronology
Live (1995)	The Leo Kottke Anthology (1997)	Standing in My Shoes (1997)

The Leo Kottke Anthology is a two-disc compilation of American guitarist Leo Kottke's releases on the Takoma, Capitol and Chrysalis labels, covering the first 15 years of his career. It includes liner notes by Kottke himself for each song and an essay by Mark Humphrey.

A number of compilations have been made of Kottke's music by his various record labels. Capitol had previously released 1971-1976, The Best and The Best of Leo Kottke. Chrysalis had released Essential and Blue Note released two instrumentals-only compilations in 2003.

== Reception ==
Professional ratings
Review scores
Source	Rating
AllMusic	4.5/5 stars
Encyclopedia of Popular Music	4/5 stars

Writing for AllMusic, music critic Richie Unterberger wrote of the album, "This has a higher proportion of Kottke's vocals than some might expect, which may mildly disappoint fans who value his guitar virtuosity more than any of his other attributes. It's still a good, well-chosen compilation, leaning most heavily on his first three albums from the late '60s and early '70s, although this comprises less than half the set."

== Track listing ==
- All songs by Leo Kottke except as noted.
- The songs are sequenced in chronological order according to album release.
- The largest representation is from Greenhouse with five tracks included. The least represented is Chewing Pine which contributes only one track.
- There are 12 vocal tracks out of 37 (depending how one counts "Side One Suite")
- "Easter", "The Medley", and "The Train and the Gate" are live recordings.

=== Disc one ===
1. "The Driving of the Year Nail" – 1:55
2. "Ojo" – 2:12
3. "Vaseline Machine Gun" – 3:09
4. "Busted Bicycle" – 2:45
5. "Cripple Creek" (Traditional) – 1:56
6. "Eight Miles High" (Gene Clark, David Crosby, Roger McGuinn) – 3:33
7. "Bumblebee" – 3:39
8. "Bourree" (J.S. Bach) – 1:26
9. "Bean Time" – 2:32
10. "Tiny Island" (Al Gaylor) – 3:46
11. "In Christ There Is No East Or West" (Traditional) – 2:12
12. "Last Steam Engine Train" (John Fahey) – 3:00
13. "From the Cradle to the Grave" (Kottke, Ron Nagle) – 3:23
14. "Louise" (Paul Siebel) – 4:02
15. "Easter" [Live] – 3:18
16. "Medley: Crow River Waltz/Jesu, Joy of Man's Desiring/Jack Fig" (Kottke, Johann Sebastian Bach) [Live] – 7:32
17. "Pamela Brown" (Tom T. Hall) – 4:03
18. "You Tell Me Why" (Ron Elliott) – 3:58
19. "Born To Be With You" (Don Robertson) – 3:02

=== Disc two ===
1. "Mona Ray" – 3:40
2. "When Shrimps Learn to Whistle" – 3:28
3. "The Scarlatti Rip-off" – 3:32
4. "Open Country Joy (Constant Traveler)" (Leo Kottke, John McLaughlin) – 3:39
5. "Buckaroo" (Bob Morris) – 2:03
6. "The White Ape" – 2:08
7. "Range" – 3:24
8. "Airproofing" – 2:16
9. "Up Tempo" – 1:40
10. "Endless Sleep" (Nick Lowe) – 3:37
11. "Sonora’s Death Row" (Kevin Blackie Farrell) – 4:30
12. "Embryonic Journey" (Jorma Kaukonen) – 3:15
13. "Learning The Game" (Buddy Holly) – 4:06
14. "The Train and The Gate" [Live] – 3:02
15. "Side One Suite:"
  1. "Some Birds" – 0:59
  2. "Sounds Like..." – 1:28
  3. "Slang" – 2:42
  4. "My Double" – 2:05
  5. "Three Walls and Bars" – 2:13
  6. "Reprise: Some Birds" – :59
16. "Sleep Walk" (Johnny Farina, Santo Farina, Ann Farina) – 2:23
17. "Rings" (Alex Harvey, Eddie Reeves)– 2:45
18. "Julie’s House" – 3:17

== Personnel ==
- Leo Kottke - 6 & 12-string guitar, vocals
- David Kemper - drums
- David Miner – bass
- Albert Lee - guitar
- Emmylou Harris - background vocals
- Kenny Buttrey – drums
- Paul Lagos - drums
- Michael Johnson - guitar
- Mike Leech – bass
- Roy Estrada - bass
- Bobby Ogdin - piano
- John Harris – piano
- Bill Berg – drums
- Bill Peterson – bass
- Bill Barber – piano, synthesizer

Production notes:

- Compilation Producers - James Austin and Rick Clark
- Liner notes - Mark Humphrey and Leo Kottke
- Remastering - Ron McMaster
- Design - Maria Villar
