= Farm Fresh Onions =

Studio album by Robert Earl Keen
- Released: October 7, 2003 (US)
- Genre: Folk
- Length: 52:36
- Label: Audium AUD-CD-8191 (US)
- Producer: Rich Brotherton

Robert Earl Keen chronology
Gravitational Forces (2001)	Farm Fresh Onions (2003)	What I Really Mean (2005)

Professional ratings
Review scores
Source	Rating
AllMusic	4/5 stars
All Things Considered	(not rated)
The Music Box	3/5 stars
PopMatters	(not rated)

Farm Fresh Onions is an album by Texas-based folk singer-songwriter Robert Earl Keen, released in the United States on October 7, 2003 (see 2003 in music).

== Track listing ==
- All tracks written by Robert Earl Keen, except where noted.
1. "Furnace Fan" – 3:58
2. "All I Have Is Today" – 3:28
3. "Out Here in the Middle" (James McMurtry) – 4:29
4. "Train Trek" – 6:00
5. "Farm Fresh Onions" – 4:46
6. "Floppy Shoes" – 3:36
7. "Gone On" – 2:42
8. "So Sorry Blues" – 4:23
9. "Beats the Devil" – 3:01
10. "These Years" – 3:49
11. "Famous Words" – 3:46
12. "Let the Music Play" (Robert Earl Keen, Bill Whitbeck) – 5:36
13. "Farm Fresh Onions Extras" – 3:02

== Chart performance ==
Chart (2003)	Peak position
U.S. Billboard Top Country Albums	24
U.S. Billboard 200	172
U.S. Billboard Top Heatseekers	9
