= Walking Distance (album) =

Studio album by Robert Earl Keen
- Released: October 27, 1998
- Genre: Folk
- Length: 43:53
- Label: Arista
- Producer: Gurf Morlix, Robert Earl Keen

Robert Earl Keen chronology
Picnic (1997)	Walking Distance (1998)	Gravitational Forces (2001)

Professional ratings
Review scores
Source	Rating
AllMusic	4/5 stars
Entertainment Weekly	C+

Walking Distance is an album by the Texas-based folk singer-songwriter Robert Earl Keen. It was released in the United States in 1998 on Arista Records.

The album peaked at No. 149 on the Billboard 200.

== Critical reception ==
The Washington Post opined that "he's still a shaky singer but few folks are writing narrative songs as good as these." Entertainment Weekly called Keen "a gifted wordsmith, an indifferent melodist, and a flat-out non-singer."

== Track listing ==
All tracks written by Robert Earl Keen, except where noted

1. "Down That Dusty Trail" – 3:39
2. "Travelin' Light" – 3:53 (Peter Case, Bob Neuwirth)
3. "Feelin' Good Again" – 3:17
4. "That Buckin' Song" – 2:19
5. "I'll Be Here For You" – 4:05
6. "Billy Gray" – 4:34 (Norman Blake)
7. "Theme: Road To No Return" / "Carolina" – 8:14
8. "New Life In Old Mexico" – 4:18
9. "Still Without You" / "Conclusion: Road To No Return" – 5:13
10. Silent Track – 1:00
11. "Happy Holidays Y'all" – 3:21
