= What I Really Mean =

Studio album by Robert Earl Keen
- Released: May 10, 2005 (US)
- Recorded: ?
- Genre: Folk
- Length: 47:18
- Label: Koch KOC-CD-9810 (U.S.)
- Producer: Rich Brotherton

Robert Earl Keen chronology
Farm Fresh Onions (2003)	What I Really Mean (2005)	Live at the Ryman (2006)

Professional ratings
Review scores
Source	Rating
AllMusic	4/5 stars
E!	B link
The Music Box	May '05
PopMatters	8/10
Rolling Stone	05/19/05

What I Really Mean is an album by American folk singer-songwriter Robert Earl Keen, released in the United States on May 10, 2005, by Koch Entertainment.

== Track listing ==
- All tracks written by Robert Earl Keen, except where noted.
1. "For Love" – 4:23
2. "Mr. Wolf and Mamabear" – 3:45
3. "What I Really Mean" – 3:46
4. "The Great Hank" – 4:51
5. "The Wild Ones" – 4:27
6. "Long Chain" (Jimmy Driftwood) – 5:31
7. "Broken End of Love" – 3:24
8. "The Dark Side of the World" – 4:52
9. "The Traveling Storm" – 4:27
10. "A Border Tale" (Featuring Ray Price) (traditional, José Lopez Alavez, Keen, Edward B. Marks) – 4:10
11. "Ride" (Robert Earl Keen, Bill Whitbeck) – 3:42

== Chart performance ==
Chart (2005)	Peak position
U.S. Billboard Top Country Albums	21
U.S. Billboard 200	122
U.S. Billboard Top Heatseekers	1
