= West Textures =

Studio album by Robert Earl Keen
- Released: November 10, 1989
- Genres: Folk, alt.country
- Length: 37:59
- Label: Sugar Hill
- Producer: Jim Rooney

Robert Earl Keen chronology
The Live Album (1988)	West Textures (1989)	A Bigger Piece Of Sky (1993)

Professional ratings
Review scores
Source	Rating
Allmusic	3.5/5 stars

West Textures is an album by Texas-based folk singer-songwriter Robert Earl Keen (credited on this album as Robert Earl Keen, Jr.), released in the United States in 1989 on the Sugar Hill record label. It is notable for the track "The Road Goes On Forever" which has become Keen's signature song and has been covered by other bands including the country supergroup The Highwaymen.

== Track listing ==
All tracks written by Robert Earl Keen, except where noted

1. "Sing One For Sister" – 3:03
2. "The Road Goes On Forever" – 5:01
3. "Maria" – 4:30
4. "Sonora's Death Row" (Kevin Farrell) – 4:31
5. "Mariano" – 3:31
6. "Don't Turn Out The Light" (Bob McDill) – 2:51
7. "Leavin' Tennessee" – 2:54
8. "Jennifer Johnson & Me" (Fred Koller, Shel Silverstein) – 3:20
9. "The Five Pound Bass" – 2:57
10. "It's The Little Things" – 2:21
11. "Love's A Word I Never Throw Around" – 3:00

== Production ==
- Produced By Jim Rooney
- Engineer: Bil VornDick
- Mastering: Jim Lloyd

== Personnel ==
- Robert Earl Keen: Lead Vocal, Rhythm Guitar
- Mark Howard: Rhythm & Lead Guitar
- Jonathan Yudkin: Fiddle & Mandolin, Backing & Harmony Vocal
- Roy Huskey, Jr.: Electric & Upright Bass
- Joey Miskulin: Accordion
- Pat McInerney: Drums, Percussion
