= Human Remains (Terry Allen album) =

Studio album by Terry Allen
- Released: 1996
- Genre: Country
- Label: Sugar Hill
- Producer: Terry Allen, Lloyd Maines

Terry Allen chronology
Silent Majority (Terry Allen's Greatest Missed Hits) (1992)	Human Remains (1996)	Salivation (1999)

Professional ratings
Review scores
Source	Rating
AllMusic	4.5/5 stars
Los Angeles Times	3/4 stars

Human Remains is an album by Terry Allen, released in 1996 by Sugar Hill Records. The album featured guest appearances by David Byrne, Joe Ely, Charlie and Will Sexton and Lucinda Williams.

The song "Galleria Dele Armi" is dedicated to the Balvano train disaster.

== Track listing ==
All tracks composed by Terry Allen; except where indicated

1. "Gone to Texas"
2. "Room to Room"
3. "Back to Black"
4. "Wilderness of This World" (David Byrne)
5. "Little Sandy"
6. "Buck Naked" (David Byrne)
7. "What of Alicia"
8. "That Kind of Girl"
9. "Galleria Dele Armi" (Will Sexton)
10. "Crisis Site 13"
11. "Peggy Legg"
12. "After the Fall"
13. "Flatland Boogie"
