= Hotel Rose =

Hotel in Portland, Oregon, U.S.

- The hotel's logo

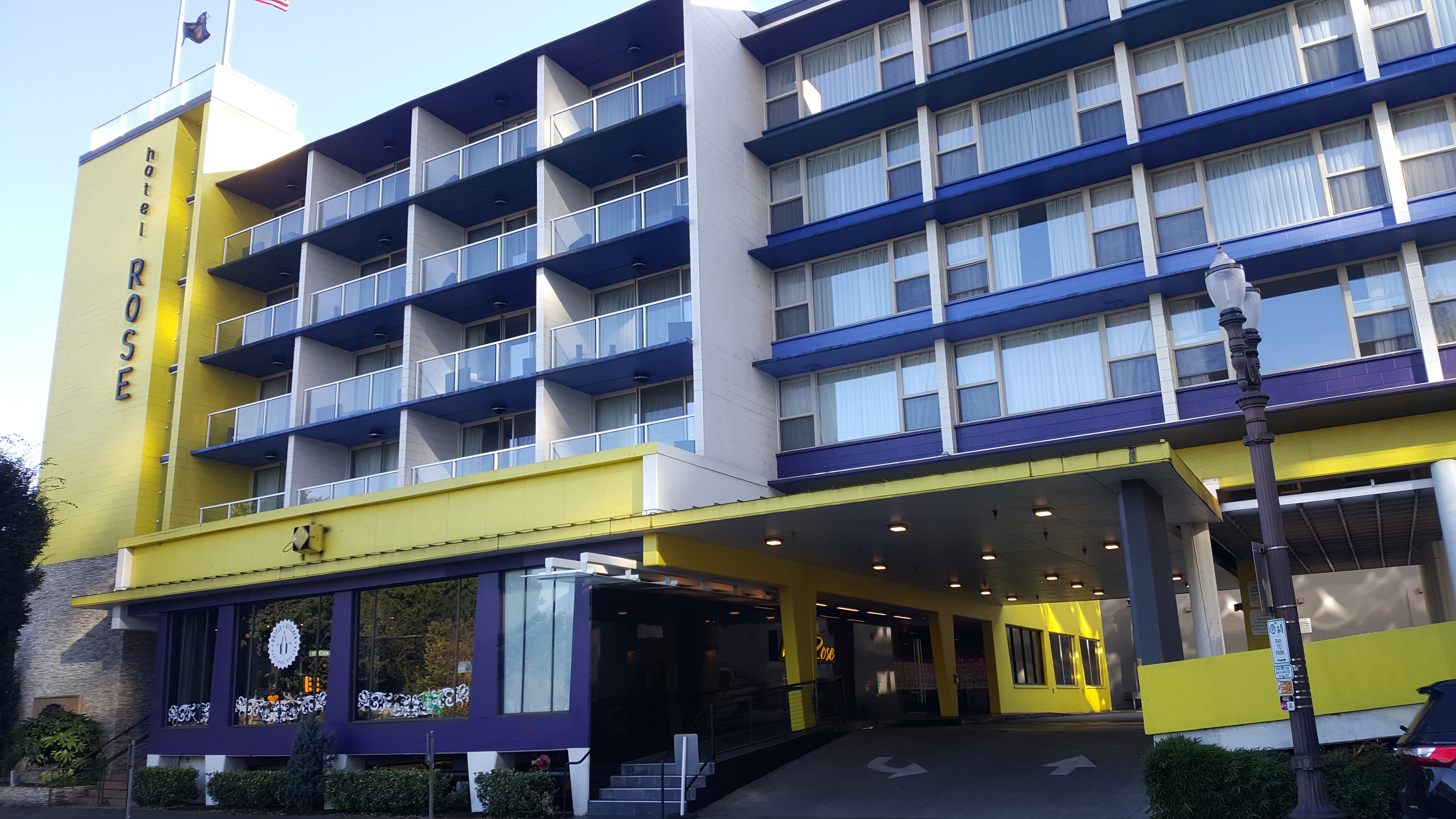
- The hotel's exterior in 2020
- Interactive map of the Hotel Rose area
- Former names: Riverside West Motor Hotel; Hotel Fifty

General information
- Location: 50 Southwest Morrison Street, Portland, Oregon, United States
- Coordinates: 45°31′02″N 122°40′24″W
- Opened: 1964
- Renovated: October 2008
- Renovation cost: $7 million
- Owner: Pineapple Hospitality

Other information
- Number of rooms: 140

Website
- staypineapple.com/hotel-rose-portland-or

Hotel Rose, sometimes referred to as Staypineapple at Hotel Rose, is a 140-room boutique hotel in southwest Portland, Oregon, United States. Located in downtown Portland across from Tom McCall Waterfront Park, the hotel opened as Riverside West Motor Hotel in 1964 and later operated as a Four Points by Sheraton property and as Hotel Fifty.

== Description ==
The 140-room boutique hotel is located in the downtown Portland, across from Tom McCall Waterfront Park. All rooms are smoke-free. The dog-friendly hotel has a stuffed husky "hospitality mascot" named Dash.

In 2019, The Oregonian's Janet Eastman described the interior's "glamorous blasts of pineapple yellow" decor, decorative chalkboards, and a chandelier made of beer bottles. Cupcakes, coffee, and pineapple water have been offered to guests in the lobby. She also said a resort fee allows "use of a beach cruiser, fitness center and umbrella plus enjoy afternoon coffee and pineapple treats in the lobby, Wi-Fi, and the room's double duvet European style bedding, robes, 'fluffy' towels, Keurig coffee maker with unlimited custom blended coffee and tea, unlimited bottled water and unlimited local and long distance phone calls".

== History ==
The Riverside West Motor Hotel opened in 1964. In The Oregonian's 2017 list of "38 landmark Portland hotels that offer a window into Rose City's history, growth", Grant Butler wrote: "At the time, Tom McCall Waterfront Park didn't exist, so the hotel looked out on busy Harbor Drive, which would have fueled much of the hotel's business. When the park was created in the 1970s and the freeway was removed, the hotel became a popular place to stay during summer festival season." The hotel was often booked months in advance for the Rose Festival. The hotel's restaurant served breakfast, lunch and dinner.

The property was later a Starwood-operated Four Points by Sheraton. Following a November 2007 purchase by Coastal Hotel Group, the property was rebranded as Hotel Fifty. Hotel Fifty completed a $7 million renovation in October 2008. Improvements included "new interiors and exteriors, enhanced bathrooms, a newly designed restaurant and LEDs around the building", according to the Daily Journal of Commerce. The bistro and bar H5O began operating in 2008 and has been described as "an urban, contemporary fine-dining restaurant featuring scenic views of the Willamette River, approachable prices, and innovative twists on classic dishes." Willamette Week said H5O was known for "$3 chichi happy-hour snacks and $300 Spanish coffees".

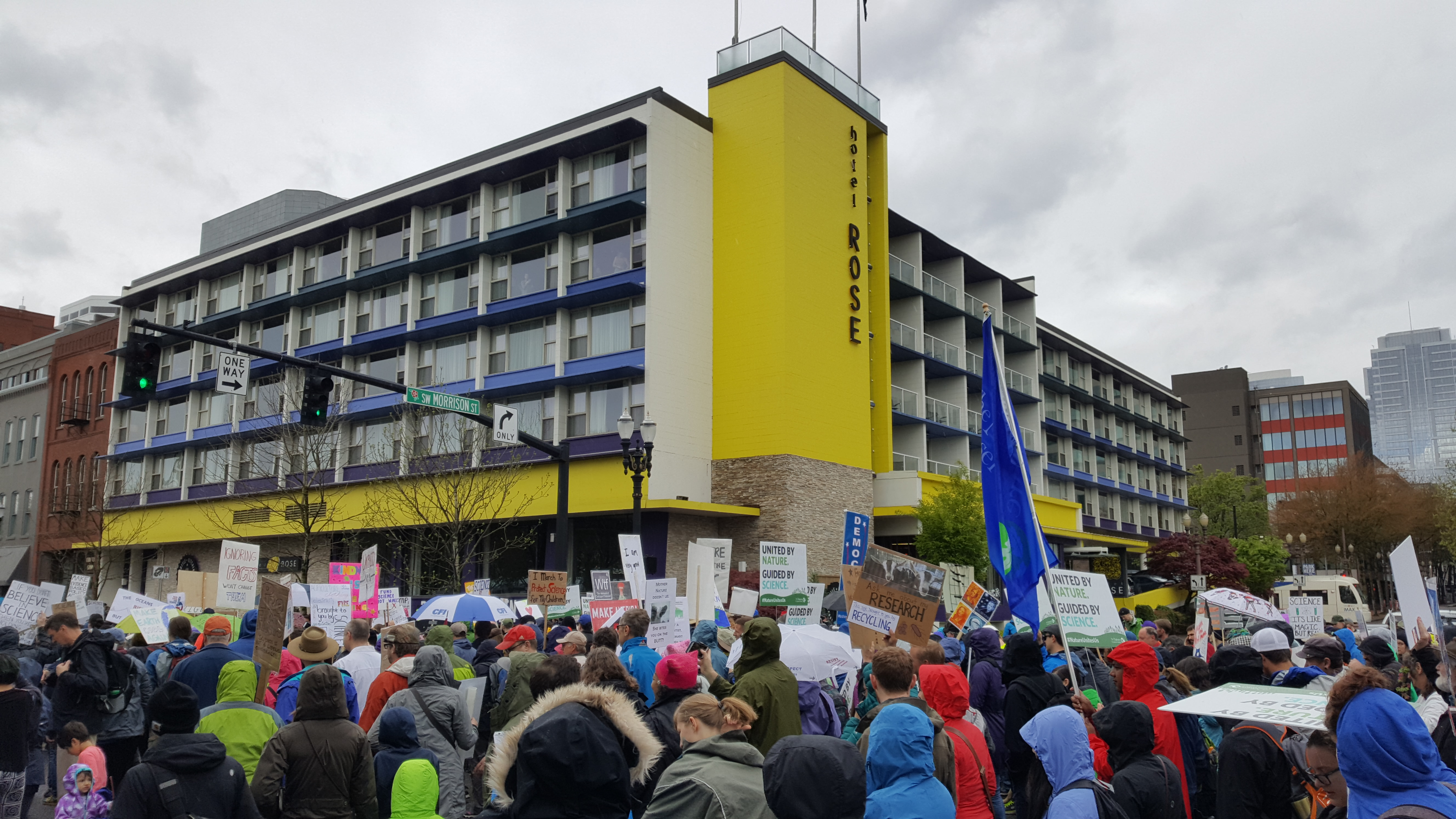
The hotel's exterior during the March for Science Portland protest, 2017

In 2013, Bellevue, Washington-based Pineapple Hospitality acquired Hotel Fifty from Oly-IDA Hotels LLC, a joint venture between Coastal Hotel Group, IDA Riverfront LLC, and an Olympic Investors LLC affiliate. The hotel was rebranded as Hotel Rose. The lobby restaurant H5O Bistro was rebranded as the gastropub Bottle + Kitchen in June 2014. The restaurant's lobby was expanded at a slight cost to the dining room.

Bottle + Kitchen bills itself as "globally inspired and locally refined". The New American menu has included burgers, pasta, seafood, and steak. Chef Ron Baker has also served Dungeness crab and pickled mango ravioli, pigs in a blanket with Chinese sausage, and Pinot-roasted duck leg for dinner, as well as cod fish and chips, pork tacos, and an Oregon Bay shrimp Louie for lunch.

In 2020, fifty-two hotel and Bottle + Kitchen restaurant employees were laid off temporarily because of the COVID-19 pandemic.

== Reception ==
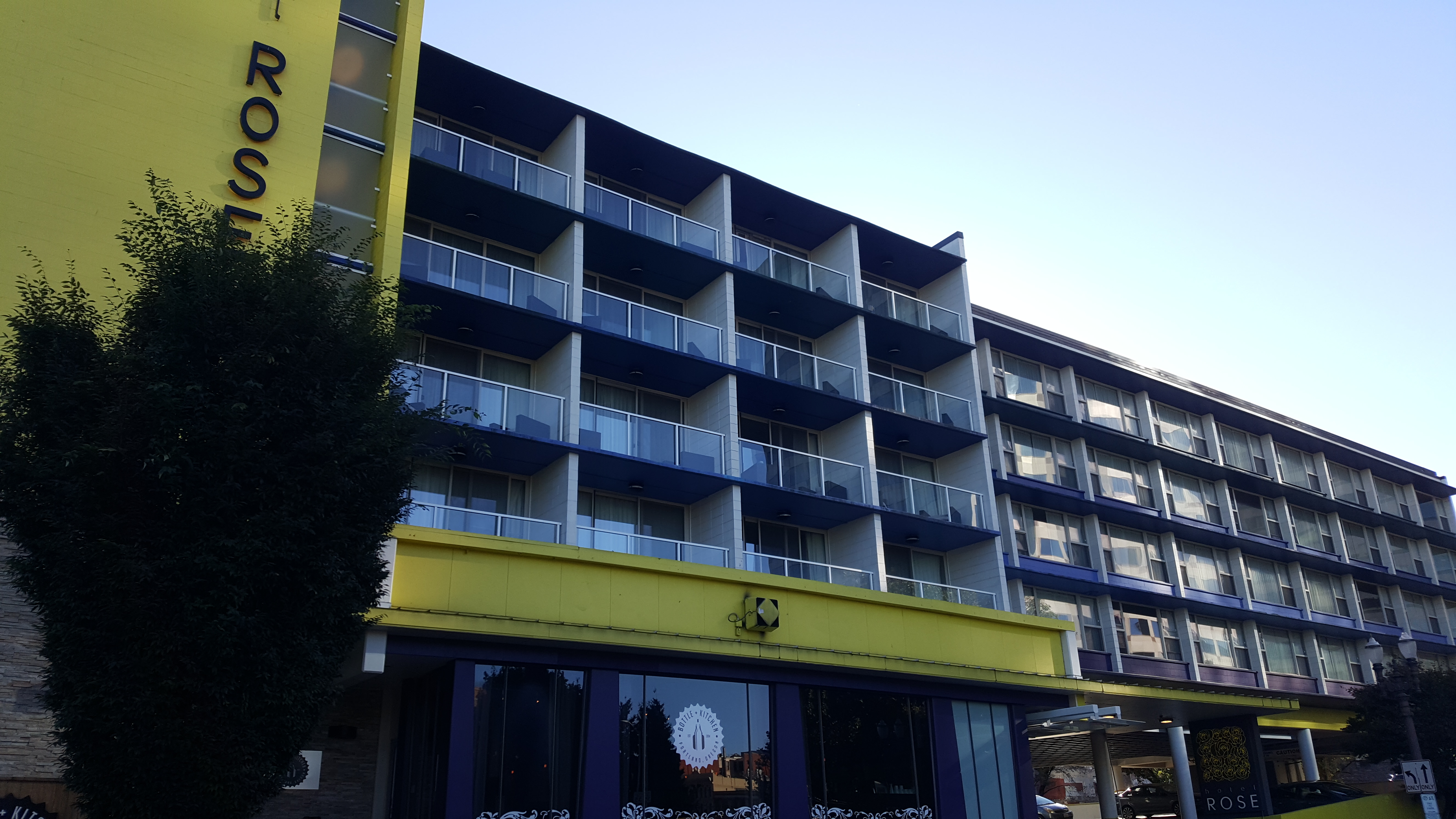
Hotel exterior, 2020

The eighth edition of Best Places: Portland (2010) recommended Hotel Fifty for families and business travelers because of its close proximity to Tom McCall Waterfront Park. Editors Elizabeth Lopeman and John Gottberg said rooms has "luxurious" linens and "sleek glass-and-marble" bathrooms. In her Insiders' Guide to Portland, Oregon, Rachel Dresbeck said of Hotel Fifty in 2014 and Hotel Rose in 2017: "This urbane and contemporary spot quite near the Willamette is a lovingly upgraded and refurbished hotel in an outstanding location."

Fodor's says, "This funky boutique property overlooking the Willamette River affords stellar views of the water, easy access to the waterfront park and the events that take place there." The travel guide has complimented the hotel for its central location, fitness center, access to free bicycle use, and Bottle + Kitchen, but acknowledged some rooms had "dull" views and traffic noise. Deanna deBara of Fodor's rated the hotel four out of five stars.
