= Marfa After Dark =

Live album by Robert Earl Keen
- Released: 2008
- Genre: Folk
- Length: 48:50

Robert Earl Keen chronology
Best (Robert Earl Keen album) (2007)	Marfa After Dark (2008)

Marfa After Dark is a live album by Texas-based Folk singer-songwriter Robert Earl Keen that was available for free download on his website. The album was recorded live at the Marfa Ballroom in Marfa, Texas in January 2008. The album is no longer available for download but is available for purchase in CD format direct from Robert Earl Keen.

== Track listing ==
1. "Intro (Ms. Chloe Keen)" – 0:46
2. "Jesse With His Long Hair Hanging Down" – 3:46
3. "Willie" – 2:42
4. "Marty & Bill Intro (Talking)" – 2:19
5. "Ride" – 3:23
6. "Border Intro (Talking)" – 1:12
7. "A Border Tragedy" – 3:11
8. "The Annux (Talking)" – 1:34
9. "Long Chain" – 5:31
10. "Rich Intro (Talking)" – 1:00
11. "Lonely Feeling" – 7:46
12. "Tom Intro (Talking)" – 1:03
13. "Mariano" – 3:54
14. "A Joke (Talking That Is Funny)" – 2:46
15. "The Great Hank" – 4:53
16. "Panhandle Intro (Talking)" – 0:51
17. "Panhandle Rag" – 2:07
