= No Kinda Dancer =

Studio album by Robert Earl Keen
- Released: October 1, 1984
- Genre: Folk
- Length: 37:47 (49:39 – Re-Release)
- Label: Workshop Records (Original); Philo Records (Re-release); KOCH (Re-release)
- Producer: Robert Earl Keen

Robert Earl Keen chronology
No Kinda Dancer (1984)	The Live Album (1988)

Professional ratings
Review scores
Source	Rating
AllMusic	4.5/5 stars

No Kinda Dancer is the debut album by Texas-based folk singer-songwriter Robert Earl Keen, originally released in the United States on the Austin, Texas-based Workshop Records label in 1984. A few months later, the album was issued by Philo Records and re-released in 2004 by KOCH Records with additional tracks. The horn section arrangement for the title track was created by Austin-based tubist Dan Augustine, who also performed on the original recording.

== Track listing ==
All tracks written by Robert Earl Keen, except where noted.

1. "No Kinda Dancer" – 3:04
2. "The Front Porch Song" (Robert Earl Keen, Lyle Lovett) – 3:38
3. "Between Hello & Goodbye" – 2:33
4. "Swervin' In My Lane" (descant written by Nanci Griffith) – 4:03
5. "Christabel" – 4:03
6. "Willie" – 2:34
7. "Young Lovers Waltz" – 3:38
8. "Death Of Tail Fitzsimmons" (instrumental) – 4:00
9. "Rolling By" – 3:47
10. "The Armadillo Jackal" – 3:25
11. "Song For Kathy" (previously unreleased) – 3:02
12. "Luann" – 2:58 †
13. "The Coldest Day Of Winter" – 3:23 †
14. "The Vacuum Cleaner Song" – 2:31 †

† Bonus tracks on 2004 re-release
