= Smokin' the Dummy/Bloodlines =

Studio album by Terry Allen
- Released: 1980/1983
- Recorded: July–August 1980
- Studio: Caldwell Studios, Lubbock, Texas
- Genre: Country
- Label: Sugar Hill
- Producer: Terry Allen, Lloyd Maines

Terry Allen chronology
Lubbock (On Everything) (1979)	Smokin' the Dummy/Bloodlines (1980)	Bloodlines (1983)

Professional ratings
Review scores
Source	Rating
Christgau's Record Guide	B

Smokin' the Dummy and Bloodlines are two albums released by Terry Allen in 1980 and 1983, respectively. The albums have been recently reissued on a single compact disc on Sugar Hill Records. The album features The Panhandle Mystery Band, Terry's backing band.

== Track listing ==
All tracks composed by Terry Allen; except where indicated

1. "The Heart of California"
2. "What Ever Happened to Jesus (And Maybellene)" (Chuck Berry)
3. "Helena Montana"
4. "Texas Tears"
5. "Feeling Easy"
6. "The Night Cafe"
7. "Roll Truck Roll"
8. "Red Bird"
9. "The Lubbock Tornado"
10. "Bloodlines (I)"
11. "Gimme a Ride to Heaven Boy"
12. "Cantina Carlotta"
13. "Ourland"
14. "Oh Hally Lou"
15. "Oh What a Dangerous Life"
16. "Manhattan Bluebird"
17. "There Oughta Be a Law Against Sunny Southern CA"
18. "Bloodlines (II)"
