= Robert Earl Keen =

American country singer (born 1956)

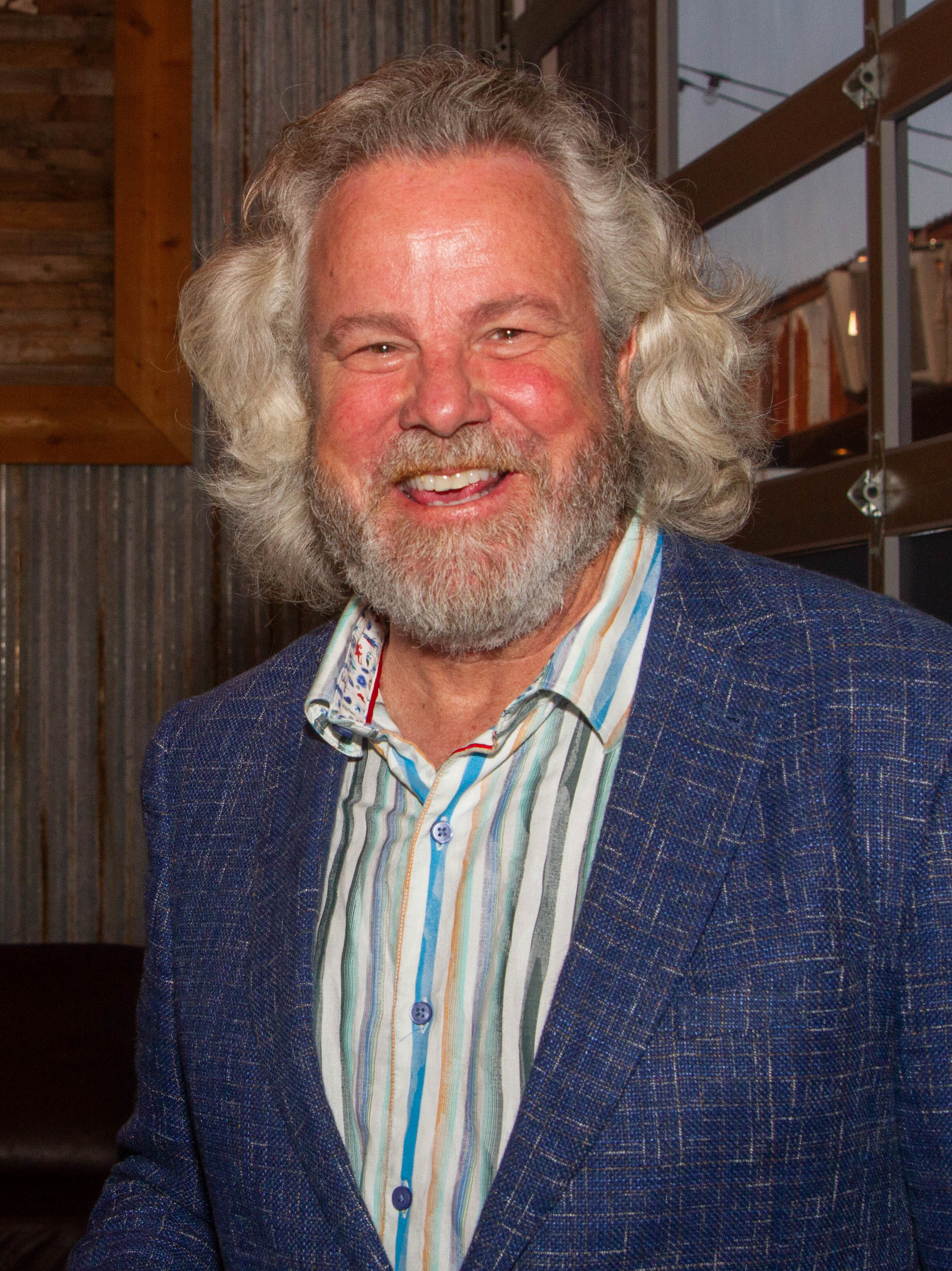
- Keen in 2018

Background information
- Born: January 11, 1956 (age 70)
- Origin: Houston, Texas, U.S.
- Genres: Americana, country, alternative country
- Occupations: Singer, songwriter
- Instruments: Vocals, guitar, mandolin
- Years active: 1984–Present
- Labels: Dualtone, Arista, Sugar Hill, KOCH, Lost Highway, Rosetta
- Website: robertearlkeen.com

Robert Earl Keen (born January 11, 1956) is an American country singer and songwriter from Houston, Texas.

== Early life and education ==
Keen was born and grew up in Houston, Texas. As a teenager, he was an avid reader who excelled in writing and literature classes. Keen was a fan of the British rock band Cream, and was influenced by country music from artists Willie Nelson, Norman Blake, Jesse Winchester, Flatt and Scruggs, Bill Withers, Gary Stewart, and Jimmie Rodgers.

After graduation from Sharpstown High School, Keen started playing guitar himself shortly thereafter, learning to play classic country covers out of a songbook the summer before starting college at Texas A&M University in College Station, Texas. He graduated with a bachelor of arts in English in 1978, and began writing songs and playing bluegrass and folk music with friends, including his childhood friend (and future longtime fiddle player in his band) Bryan Duckworth. During his college years, Keen lived with future musician Lyle Lovett.

== Career ==
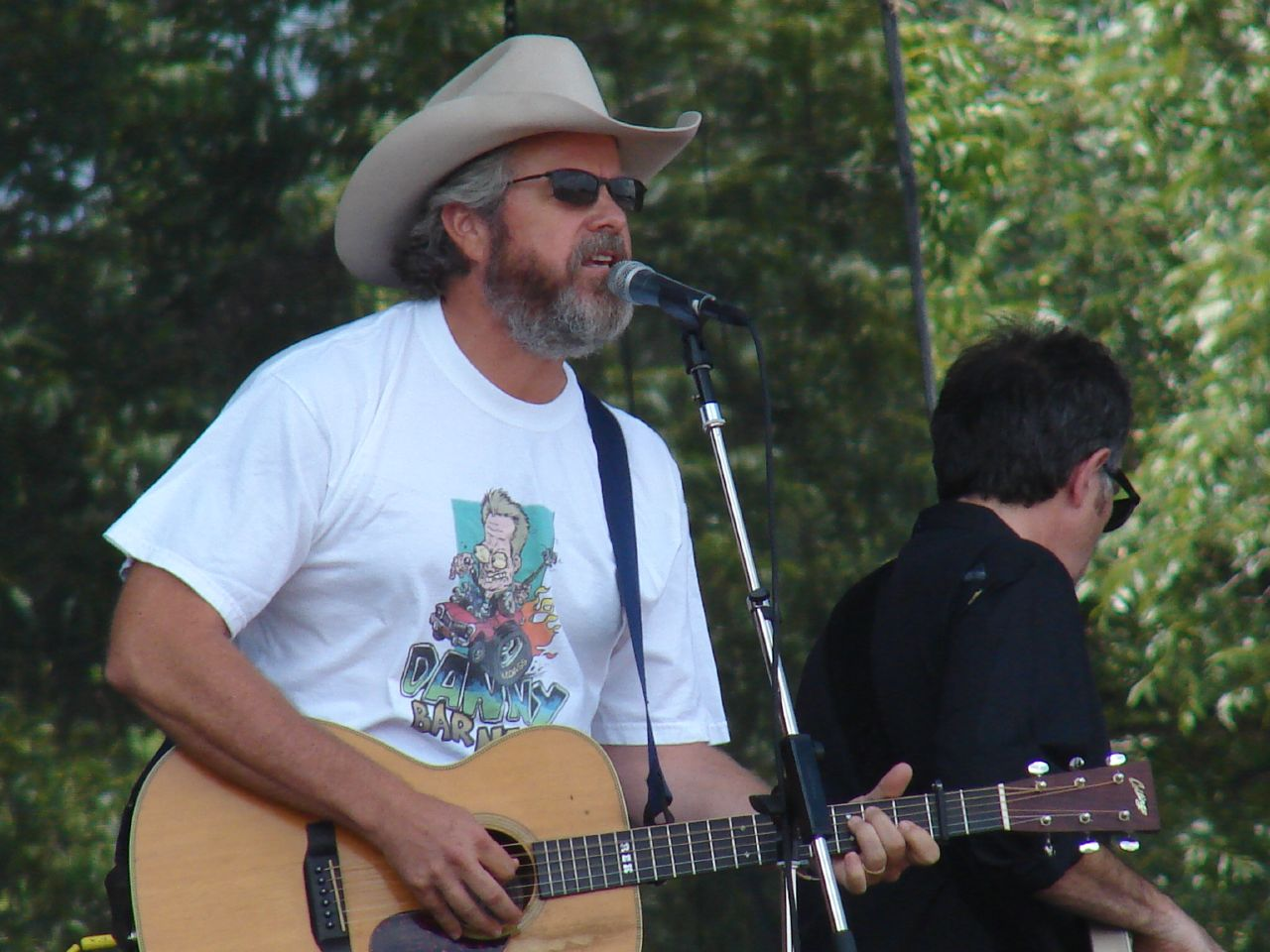
Keen performing in 2007

In 1978, Keen graduated from Texas A&M and moved to Austin, Texas. He performed in nightclubs and live-music venues in Austin, including Cactus Cafe, Emma Joe's, Alamo Lounge, Liberty Lunch, Anderson Fair in Houston, and Gruene Hall near New Braunfels. In 1983, Keen won the New Folk competition at the Kerrville Folk Festival in Kerrville, Texas. That same year, he began making his self-produced first album, No Kinda Dancer.

Following the release of this album in 1985, Keen moved to Nashville with his future wife, Kathleen Gray. He signed a publishing deal, a new independent label deal, and signed with a national booking agent. While in Nashville, Keen and Gray worked at Hatch Show Print shop.

Keen returned to Texas in 1987 and released his second album, The Live Album, in 1988, followed by his third album, West Textures in 1989. West Textures featured the first recording of Keen's signature song, "The Road Goes on Forever". Fellow Texan Joe Ely recorded the song on his 1993 album Love and Danger, along with another Keen song, "Whenever Kindness Fails". Keen's own version of "Whenever Kindness Fails" appeared on his fourth album, 1993's A Bigger Piece of Sky. In 1994, he released Gringo Honeymoon followed by No. 2 Live Dinner in 1996.

Keen has continued to write and record music, while also maintaining a prodigious tour schedule. His 1997 album, Picnic, marked the beginning of his on-again, off-again relationship with major labels (both that album and 1998's Walking Distance were issued on Arista Records, and 2001's Gravitational Forces, 2009's The Rose Hotel, and 2011's Ready for Confetti were released on Lost Highway Records). Keen's other albums include 2003's Farm Fresh Onions (Audium/Koch Records) and 2005's What I Really Mean and 2006's Live at the Ryman (both on E1 Music). The producers with whom he has worked on those albums have included John Keane, Gurf Morlix, Gary Velletri, and Lloyd Maines. In 2022, his concert tour was listed as one of the most successful in the world.

His band includes:

- Bill Whitbeck — bass, upright bass, vocals
- Tom Van Schaik — drums, vocals
- Brian Beken — fiddle, acoustic guitar, electric guitar

In January 2022, Keen announced that he would stop touring and performing publicly after September 2022. His final tour was named the "I'm Coming Home Farewell Tour" and the final leg was played September 1, 3, and 4 at Floore's Country Store in Helotes, Texas. Approximately 3,000 people attended the last show on September 4 for nearly two-and-a-half hours. Despite the claims of playing his final shows and farewell tour, Keen proceeded to do several shows in 2023 and listed a 2024 tour on his website with a dozen stops. Instagram posts on Keen's account containing photos from his "I'm Coming Home Farewell Tour" were later edited to remove reference to the "farewell" part of the tour.

== Discography ==
=== Studio albums ===
	Title	Label	Album details	Peak chart positions					
Year	Title	Label	Album details	US Country	US	US Heat	US Indie	US Folk	US Grass
1984	No Kinda Dancer	Sugar Hill Records	CD, Cassette, LP record	—	—	—	—	—	
1989	West Textures	Sugar Hill Records	CD, Cassette	—	—	—	—	—	—
1993	A Bigger Piece of Sky	Sugar Hill Records	CD, Cassette	—	—	—	—	—	—
1994	Gringo Honeymoon	Sugar Hill Records	CD, Cassette	—	—	—	—	—	—
1997	Picnic	Arista Records	CD, Cassette	—	160	4	—	—	—
1998	Walking Distance	Arista Records	CD, Cassette	—	149	3	—	—	—
2001	Gravitational Forces	Lost Highway Records	CD	10	111	1	—	—	—
2003	Farm Fresh Onions	Audium/Koch Records	CD	24	172	9	11	—	—
2005	What I Really Mean	E1 Music	CD, Streaming, Download	21	122	1	5	—	—
2009	The Rose Hotel	Lost Highway Records	CD, Streaming, Download	17	83	—	—	10	—
2011	Ready for Confetti	Lost Highway Records	CD, Streaming, Download	21	66	—	—	3	—
2015	Happy Prisoner: The Bluegrass Sessions	Dualtone Records	CD, Streaming, Download	10	109	—	6	5	1

=== Live albums ===
Title	Album details	Peak positions
Title	Album details	US Country
The Live Album	Release date: November 15, 1988; Label: Sugar Hill Records; Formats: CD, cassette	—
No. 2 Live Dinner	Release date: March 19, 1996; Label: Sugar Hill Records; Formats: CD, cassette	—
The Party Never Ends	Release date: October 14, 2003; Label: Sugar Hill Records; Formats: CD	68
Live from Austin TX	Release date: November 2, 2004; Label: New West Records; Formats: CD, music download	—
Live at the Ryman	Release date: July 11, 2006; Label: E1 Music; Formats: CD, music download	—
Marfa After Dark	Release date: 2008; Label: self-released; Formats: Music download	—
Live Dinner Reunion	Release date: November 18, 2016; Label: Dualtone Music; Formats: CD, Music download	29
"—" denotes releases that did not chart

=== Compilation albums ===
Title	Album details
Best	Release date: November 7, 2006; Label: E1 Music; Formats: CD, music download

=== Singles ===
Year	Single	Album
1984	"No Kinda Dancer"	No Kinda Dancer
1984	"The Armadillo Jackal"	No Kinda Dancer
1997	"Over the Waterfall"	Picnic
1997	"Levelland"	Picnic
1997	"Undone"	Picnic
1998	"Down That Dusty Trail"	Walking Distance
1999	"That Buckin' Song"	Walking Distance
2001	"Hello New Orleans"	Gravitational Forces
2001	"Not A Drop of Rain"	Gravitational Forces
2002	"High Plains Jamboree"	Gravitational Forces
2003	"Furnace"	Farm Fresh Onions
2003	"All I Have Is Today"	Farm Fresh Onions
2005	"What I Really Mean"	What I Really Mean
2005	"The Great Hank"	What I Really Mean
2009	"The Rose Hotel"	The Rose Hotel
2010	"The Man Behind the Drums"	The Rose Hotel
2011	"I Gotta Go"	Ready for Confetti

=== Music videos ===
Year	Video	Director
1997	"Over the Waterfall"	Steven T. Miller/R. Brad Murano
2004	"Merry Christmas from the Family"	David McClister
2005	"What I Really Mean"	
2015	"Hot Corn Cold Corn"	Curtis Millard
2015	"Footprints in the Snow"	Matt Bizer

=== Other appearances ===
Year	Song	Album
2018	"Do Wacka Do"	King of the Road: A Tribute to Roger Miller

=== Notable covers ===
Year	Performer	Single	Reference
1987	Nanci Griffith	"Sing one for Sister"	
2009	Reckless Kelly	"Think It Over One Time"	
2009	Max Stalling, Dale Clark	"No Kinda Dancer"	
2009	Wade Bowen	"Lynville Train"	
2009	Brandon Jenkins	"What I Really Mean"	
2009	Randy Rogers	"I'll Be Here for You"	
2009	Roger Creager	"I Would Change My Life"	
2001	Cory Morrow	"I'll Go Downtown"	
2009	Jason Boland	"Mariano"	
2009	Cody Canada	"Shades of Gray"	
1995	The Highwaymen	"The Road Goes on Forever"	
2009	Chris Knight	"Undone"	
2009	Todd Snider	"Corpus Christi Bay"	
2001	Lyle Lovett	"This Old Porch"	
1998	Lyle Lovett	"Rollin' By"	
1998	George Strait	"Maria"	
1992	Joe Ely	"Whenever Kindness Fails" "The Road Goes on Forever"	
2006	Cross Canadian Ragweed	"Lonely Feelin'"	
2000	Dixie Chicks	"Merry Christmas from the Family"	
2015	Shawn Colvin	"Not a Drop of Rain"	

== Honors ==
Year	Honor	Reference
1983	Kerrville Folk Festival New Folk Competition	
2015	BMI Troubadour Award	
2016	Inducted into the Texas Heritage Songwriters Hall of Fame	
2018	Texas A&M University Distinguished Alumni Award	
2019	Inducted into the Texas Cowboy Hall of Fame	
