= Terry Allen (country singer) =

American singer-songwriter

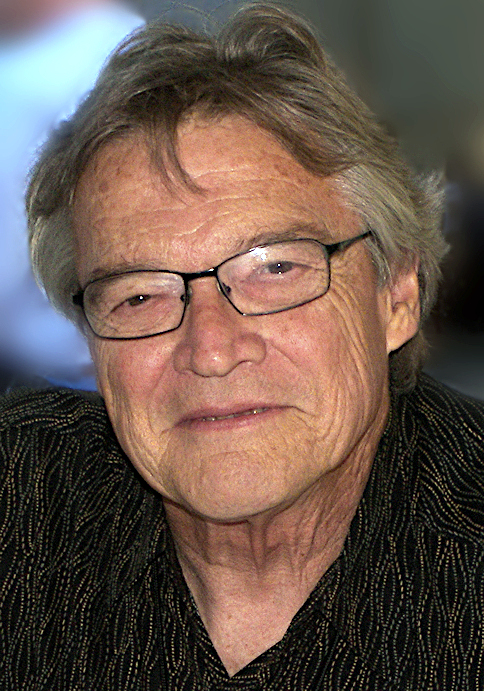
- Terry Allen at the 2010 Texas Book Festival

Background information
- Born: May 7, 1943 (age 83); Wichita, Kansas
- Genres: Outlaw country; Progressive country; Texas country
- Occupations: Singer-songwriter; painter; sculptor; conceptual artist
- Instruments: Vocals; piano; guitar
- Years active: 1965–present

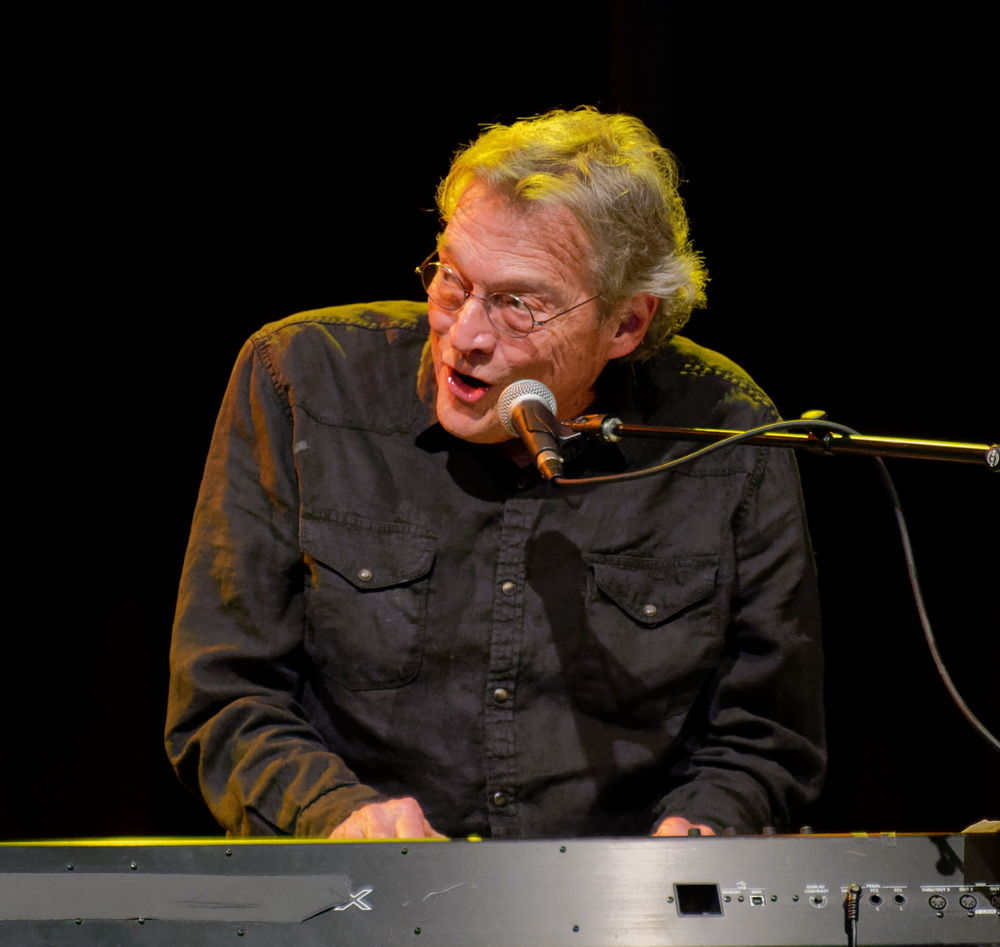
Terry Allen in Dallas, 2018

Terry Allen (born May 7, 1943) is an American singer-songwriter and visual artist from Lubbock, Texas. Allen's musical career spans several albums in the Texas country and outlaw country genres, and his visual art includes painting, conceptual art, performance, and sculpture, with a number of notable bronze sculptures installed publicly in various cities throughout the United States. He currently lives in Santa Fe, New Mexico.

Allen has recorded twelve albums of original songs, including the landmark releases Juarez (1975) and Lubbock (On Everything) (1979). His song "Amarillo Highway" has been covered by Bobby Bare, Sturgill Simpson, Robert Earl Keen and The Amos Garrett/Doug Sahm/Gene Taylor Band. Other artists who have recorded Allen's songs include Guy Clark, Little Feat, David Byrne, Doug Sahm, Ricky Nelson, and Lucinda Williams. Rolling Stone magazine describes his catalog, reaching back to Juarez as "..uniformly eccentric and uncompromising, savage and beautiful, literate and guttural."

Allen also works with a wide variety of media including musical and theatrical performances, sculpture, painting, drawing and video, and installations which incorporate any and all of these media. His work has been shown throughout the United States and internationally.

== Early life ==
He was born in Wichita, Kansas, United States. Allen's father was Fletcher ("Sled") Allen (August 23, 1886 in West Plains, Missouri – October 16, 1959 in Lubbock, Texas) a catcher in 1910 for the St. Louis Browns, who continued his career as a player-manager in the Texas League.

Allen attended Monterey High School in Lubbock, Texas. His contemporaries at Monterey High School included Butch Hancock, Jimmie Dale Gilmore, Joe Ely, Jo Harvey Allen and Jo Carol Pierce. Trained as an architect, he received a B.F.A. from the Chouinard Art Institute in 1966. After briefly teaching at his alma mater (1968–1969) and the University of California, Berkeley (1971), Allen served on the faculty of the California State University, Fresno as a guest lecturer (1971–1973), associate professor (1974–1977) and professor (1978–1979) of art before resigning his appointment to pursue other opportunities. His art has been supported by three National Endowment for the Arts grants and a prestigious Guggenheim Fellowship. His work Trees (the music, literary and third trees) is installed on the campus of the University of California, San Diego as part of the Stuart Collection. His artwork has been featured at the L.A. Louver art gallery in Venice, California.

== Visual artist ==
His works are represented in the collections of many international museums including the New York Museum of Modern Art, the Detroit Institute of Arts, the Nelson-Atkins Museum of Art in Kansas City, the San Diego Museum of Contemporary Art, the Los Angeles County Museum of Art, the New York Metropolitan Museum of Art, Espace Lyonnais d'Art Contemporain, Musée Saint-Pierre, Lyon, France, the Houston Museum of Fine Arts, the San Francisco Museum of Modern Art, The Contemporary Austin, the Dallas Museum of Art, the Art Museum of Southeast Texas, the University of California, San Diego, and the Los Angeles Museum of Contemporary Art.

Kansas City, Missouri is home to both his controversial public sculpture Modern Communication as well as The Belger Collection which features Terry Allen as one of their seven "core artists".

Scioto Lounge is a series of three deer statues by Allen in Downtown Columbus, Ohio.

== Music ==
Allen first learned to play piano from his mother, Pauline Pierce Allen, a professional musician. In 1962, while in high school, he wrote his first song, "Red Bird", which he would go on to perform live on Shindig! in 1965, and record for his 1980 album Smokin' the Dummy.

In 1975, Allen released his debut art-country album, Juarez, which is considered "one of the greatest concept albums of all time" according to PopMatters. Rolling Stone later called it an "outlaw classic".

Allen's 1979 follow up was the groundbreaking Lubbock (On Everything). The songwriter's deeply moving and satirical lyrics capture his complex memory of growing up in his hometown of Lubbock. According to AllMusic, Lubbock (On Everything) is "one of the finest country albums of all time" and a progenitor of the alt-country movement. One of the songs, "New Delhi Freight Train", was first recorded by Little Feat and appears on their 1977 album Time Loves a Hero. Guy Clark said of the song, "It's such an interesting piece of work. It’s really fun to play. The music, it’s really nice. But it's the juxtaposition of the song."

In 1980, Allen released Smokin' the Dummy, recorded with the Panhandle Mystery Band.

His 1983 album Bloodlines includes one of his better-known songs, "Gimme a Ride to Heaven Boy", the tale of a driver who picks up a hitchhiker on the road one night who claims to be Jesus Christ.

In 1986, Allen collaborated with director David Byrne on the soundtrack for the film True Stories.

Over the following decade (1985–1995), Allen released a series of albums with avant-garde elements, as companions to visual art, theatrical and musical projects – Pedal Steal, Amerasia and Chippy (the latter also the soundtrack of a stage play in collaboration with Joe Ely, Butch Hancock, Robert Earl Keen and Wayne Hancock).

In 1996, he released the country album Human Remains, which features guests including David Byrne, Joe Ely, Charlie and Will Sexton and Lucinda Williams.

In 2007, Allen appeared on the track "Ghost of Travelin' Jones" on Ryan Bingham's album Mescalito.

Allen's 2013 album Bottom of the World features "Queenie's Song", inspired by the death of his dog and co-written with Guy Clark.

== Personal life ==
Allen has two children, Bukka and Bale Creek.

== Discography ==
- Juarez (1975)
- Lubbock (On Everything) (1979)
- Smokin' the Dummy (1980)
- Bloodlines (1983)
- Pedal Steal (1985)
- Amerasia (1987)
- Silent Majority (Terry Allen's Greatest Missed Hits) (1992)
- Chippy (1995)
- Human Remains (1996)
- Salivation (1999)
- Live at Al's Grand Hotel. Recorded May 7, 1971 (2012)
- Bottom of the World (2013)
- Pedal Steal + Four Corners (2019)
- Just Like Moby Dick (2020)
- Blood Sucking Maniacs (2026)
