= Mountain Jam (festival) =

Music festival in upstate New York

- Genre: Jam band, Rock, Jazz, Blues, Reggae
- Dates: June 20-22, 2025
- Locations: Belleayre Mountain, New York (2025); Bethel Woods, New York (2019); Hunter Mountain, New York (2005-2018)
- Years active: 2005–present
- Website: https://mountainjamfestival.com/

Mountain Jam is an annual music festival held in upstate New York since 2005. It started as a small one day music festival in 2005 with 3000 attendees, and has grown over the years into the largest rock and camping festival in the Northeast that is usually three or four days long, drawing over 40,000 attendees over the duration of the Festival.. The Mountain Jam festival reduced the number of tickets it will sold in 2025 in order to provide attendees with a more intimate fan experience at its new location at Belleayre Mountain in Highmount, New York.

Mountain Jam has built a reputation for its vibrant and diverse musical offering featuring rock, jamband, Americana, indie, folk, reggae, and funk, showcasing everything from well-known headliners to emerging artists. While it is a significant festival, Mountain Jam maintains a sense of intimacy and community. The relatively smaller scale compared to some major festivals allows for a more personal and engaging experience.

The festival's setting in the picturesque Catskill Mountains adds to its charm, offering attendees stunning natural views alongside the music. Beyond the performances, there are various interactive and creative experiences, multiple food options and extensive activities making it a well-rounded festival for fans of music and the outdoors alike.

== History ==
Mountain Jam was created by Gary Chetkof, the principal owner of the independent progressive radio station Radio Woodstock/WDST in 2005 to celebrate the radio station's 25th anniversary. Chetkof grew up a fan of WLIR in Long Island and WNEW in New York City, and regularly attended their summer concert festivals in Belmont Park and Central Park. Chetkof chose Hunter Mountain Ski resort for its rolling hills, picturesque Catskill Mountain ranges, and its natural amphitheater environment, along with the amenities of a ski lodge and the unique sky ride that gave patrons a ride up and down the mountain.

Over time, the festival grew to include multiple days with camping and has grown to include a diverse lineup of smaller artists, as well as large acts including Tom Petty & The Heartbreakers, Robert Plant, The Black Keys, The Lumineers, Michael Franti and Spearhead, Widespread Panic, Phil Lesh and Bob Weir, Willie Nelson, The Allman Brothers Band, Steve Winwood, Gov't Mule, The Avett Brothers, My Morning Jacket, Levon Helm, The Alabama Shakes, Steve Miller Band, Wilco, Brandi Carlile, The Avett Brothers and Pretty Lights.

In 2013 due to rising talent and overall festival production costs, Mountain Jam became a collaboration between Chetkof and Townsquare Media, which owns clusters of radio stations around the U.S. (with a focus on country radio) and promotes live events, concerts, and festivals. Chetkof and Townsquare also co-created the Taste of Country Music Festival on back-to-back weekends with Mountain Jam through 2018. That festival became the largest country music and camping festival in the Northeast.

In 2019, Chetkof ended its relationship with TownSquare Media and joined forces with Live Nation, a major global entertainment company known for its involvement in concert promotion and event management. To commemorate the Woodstock Music and Arts Fair's 50th anniversary, Mountain Jam moved to the Bethel Woods Center for the Arts. The 2019 line-up included Willie Nelson, Gov’t Mule, The Avett Brothers, The Revivalists, Dispatch and Toots and The Maytals.

The scheduled 2020 Mountain Jam line-up featured Trey Anastasio Band, Jason Isbell, Brandi Carlile, Gov’t Mule, Grace Potter, The Head and The Heart. Due to the COVID-19 pandemic, the festival was canceled] to ensure the safety of attendees, artists, and staff. This decision was part of a broader trend of festivals and large events being postponed or canceled due to public health concerns.

In 2024 Chetkof regained total ownership and control of Mountain Jam. On October 22, 2024, it was announced that Mountain Jam would return on June 20-22, 2025 at Belleayre Mountain Ski Resort in Highmount, New York. On November 19, 2024, Mountain Jam announced the 2025 lineup and ticket sales information. The lineup consists of Khruangbin, Mt. Joy, Goose, JRAD, Trampled by Turtles, Michael Franti & Spearhead, Julien Baker and Torres, moe., Molly Tuttle & Golden Highway, Dogs in a Pile, Karina Rykman, Kitchen Dwellers, Grace Bowers & the Hodge Podge, Mikaela Davis, and two local bands: Upstate and Shane Guerrette.

== 2005 ==
The original Mountain Jam, a single-day event on June 4, 2005, celebrated the 25th anniversary of WDST, Woodstock's radio station. The festival featured performances by:

- Gov't Mule
- Medeski, Martin & Wood
- Robert Randolph & The Family Band
- Xavier Rudd

== 2006 ==
After the success of the 2005 25th WDST anniversary event, Mountain Jam was extended to three days. The 2006 Mountain Jam took place June 2–4 at Hunter Mountain, New York. The New York Times described it as a "little Bonnaroo". The lineup included:

Friday Night

- DJ Logic

Saturday

- John Brown's Body
- The Trapps
- Keller Williams
- Willy Porter
- Michael Franti and Spearhead
- Shannon McNally
- Robert Randolph & the Family Band
- Benzos
- Gov't Mule
- Rose Hill Drive

Sunday

- Benevento/Russo Duo
- Joey Eppard
- Mike Gordon and Ramble Dove
- The Wood Brothers
- Medeski, Martin & Wood
- The Slip
- Grace Potter and the Nocturnals
- Gov't Mule

== 2007 ==
Mountain Jam 2007 took place June 1–3 and was cited as was the largest music festival in the Northeast/New England. . The lineup featured:

Friday

- Gov't Mule
- RAQ
- New Orleans Social Club
- The Mercers
- Papa Mali
- The Felice Brothers

Saturday

- Gov't Mule
- Tea Leaf Green
- G. Love & Special Sauce
- New Monsoon
- Umphrey's McGee
- Earl Greyhound
- Ozomatli
- U-Melt
- Assembly of Dust
- The Warhol Crowd
- Tea Leaf Green

Sunday

- Phil Lesh and Friends, including Phil Lesh, Warren Haynes, John Molo, John Scofield and Steve Molitz
- Michael Franti and Spearhead
- North Mississippi Allstars
- Robert Randolph & the Family Band
- Backyard Tire Fire
- The Brakes
- Bret Puchir and Chicken Bucket

== 2008 ==
Mountain Jam 2008 took place May 30-June 1. The three-day lineup included:

Friday

- Ratdog
- Dark Meat
- Phonograph
- BuzzUniverse
- Giant Panda Guerrilla Dub Squad
- Pete Francis
- Jim Weider's PRoJECT PERCoLAToR with special guest Lucy Bo
- Grace Potter and the Nocturnals
- Mithic Dragons
- Ivan Neville’s Dumpstaphunk
- Umphrey's McGee
- Gov't Mule
- Galactic
- Lotus
- DJ Lady Verse

Saturday

- Sgt. Dunbar and the Hobo Banned
- Ingrid Michaelson
- O'Death
- Sharon Jones & The Dap-Kings
- JJ Grey & MOFRO
- Ray LaMontagne
- Jackie Greene
- Michael Franti & Spearhead
- Citizen Cope
- Gov't Mule
- Dark Star Orchestra
- Pnuma Trio
- DJ Lady Verse

Sunday

- Larry McCray Band
- The Felice Brothers
- Dr. Dog
- Drive-By Truckers
- Medeski, Scofield, Martin & Wood
- Levon Helm Band
- Bob Weir & Ratdog

== 2009 ==
Mountain Jam 2009 took place May 29–30. The lineup included:

Friday

- Gov't Mule
- Umphrey's McGee
- Tea Leaf Green
- Railroad Earth
- Girl Talk
- Alberta Cross
- Marco Benevento

Saturday

- Gov't Mule
- Coheed & Cambria
- The Hold Steady
- Karl Denson's Tiny Universe
- Gomez
- Jackie Greene
- Brett Dennen
- Gene Ween Band
- Lee Boys
- Joe Pug
- John Medeski
- The Movement

Sunday

- The Allman Brothers Band
- Michael Franti & Spearhead
- The Derek Trucks Band
- BK3 featuring Bill Kreutzmann
- Richie Havens
- Martin Sexton
- The Brew
- Joey Eppard

== 2010 ==
Mountain Jam 2010 took place June 4 to June 6. The lineup included:

- Gov't Mule
- Levon Helm & Friends- 70th Birthday Celebration w/ very special guests
- Michael Franti & Spearhead
- Derek Trucks & Susan Tedeschi Band
- The Avett Brothers
- Les Claypool
- Yonder Mountain String Band
- Drive-By Truckers
- Matisyahu
- Toots and the Maytals
- Dark Star Orchestra
- Grace Potter and the Nocturnals
- Dr. Dog
- Dave Mason
- Jay Farrar (of Son Volt)
- Lettuce
- ALO
- The Whigs
- The New Mastersounds
- Trombone Shorty & Orleans Avenue
- Justin Townes Earle
- Jerry Joseph & Wally Ingram
- The Bridge
- Zach Deputy
- The Brew
- Simone Felice
- Gandalf Murphy & SCD
- Van Ghost
- The London Souls
- These United States
- Elmwood

== 2011 ==
Mountain Jam 2011 took place June 2 to June 5, with acts including:

- Gov’t Mule
- My Morning Jacket
- Warren Haynes Band
- Michael Franti & Spearhead
- The Avett Brothers
- Umphrey's McGee w/ John Oates
- Grace Potter & the Nocturnals
- Edward Sharpe & The Magnetic Zeros
- Béla Fleck & The Original Flecktones
- Mavis Staples
- Electric Hot Tuna
- Lotus
- North Mississippi Allstars
- Soulive
- The New Deal
- 7 Walkers
- Portugal. The Man
- Preservation Hall Jazz Band
- Tim Reynolds & TR3
- Dawes
- The London Souls
- Zach Deputy
- Ryan Montbleau Band
- Charlie Hunter
- Chris Barron
- Toubab Krewe
- Nicole Atkins
- Carbon Leaf
- Civil Twilight
- The Heavy Pets
- Orgone
- Kung Fu
- The Alternate Routes
- Dangermuffin
- Moon Taxi
- Ari Hest
- Pieta Brown
- TAB the Band
- Morning Teleportation
- Bronze Radio Return
- Nathan Moore
- Bobby Long
- The Big Takeover
- Stephen Lynch

== 2012 ==
Mountain Jam 2012 took place May 31 to June 3 at Hunter Mountain, with a lineup including:

- Steve Winwood
- Gov't Mule
- Michael Franti & Spearhead
- The Roots
- Ben Folds Five
- The Word (ft. Robert Randolph, John Medeski, and the N. Miss. Allstars)
- Trombone Shorty & Orleans Avenue
- Travelin’ McCourys w/ Keller Williams
- Karl Denson’s Tiny Universe
- Dawes
- Gary Clark Jr.
- Carolina Chocolate Drops
- Givers
- Charles Bradley
- Mariachi El Bronx
- Bustle In Your Hedgerow
- EOTO
- Anders Osborne
- Sara Watkins
- Zach Deputy
- Break Science
- Planet of the Abts
- The Lee Boys
- Marco Benevento
- Wolf!
- Sister Sparrow & The Dirty Birds
- The Sheepdogs
- The Brew
- Lukas Nelson & Promise of the Real
- Ground Up
- Pedrito Martinez
- Zee Avi
- Aunt Martha
- Kopecky Family Band
- Lauren Shera
- Uncle Lucius
- Connor Kennedy Band

Also included was a brief set in tribute to Levon Helm, who was based in nearby Woodstock and had died on April 20. The set featured Gov't Mule, the Levon Helm Band, and special guests.

== 2013 ==
Mountain Jam 2013 took place at Hunter Mountain June 6 to 9. The lineup included:

- Phil Lesh & Friends
- Widespread Panic
- Gov't Mule
- Primus
- The Avett Brothers
- The Lumineers
- Dispatch
- Michael Franti & Spearhead
- Big Gigantic
- Gary Clark Jr.
- Jackie Greene
- White Denim
- Rubblebucket
- The London Souls
- The Lone Bellow
- Futurebirds
- David Wax Museum

== 2014 ==
The 10th Mountain Jam festival took place at Hunter mountain June 5 to 8, 2014 with the following acts:

Thursday

- Diesel America
- K-Jamm
- The Dirty Gems
- Copious Jones
- Citizens Band Radio
- Dark Star Orchestra
- Umphrey's McGee

Friday

- Elijah & The Moon
- Antibalas
- Jack Laroux
- The Dough Rollers
- Robert Randolph
- The Weeks
- Trampled By Turtles
- Reignwolf
- The Avett Brothers
- Moon Taxi
- Bob Weir & Ratdog
- Beats Antique
- Antibalas

Saturday

- Ratboy Jr.
- Paul Green
- Connor Kennedy
- Blitzen Trapper
- Jack Laroux
- Alan Paul
- Sister Sparrow & the Dirty Birds
- Jeff Tweedy
- Jonathan Wilson
- Damian "Jr. Gong" Marley
- PGRA with Sister Sparrow & the Dirty Birds
- Valerie June
- Tedeschi Trucks Band
- Gov't Mule
- Pretty Lights
- Jackie Greene

Sunday

- Paul Green
- Ratboy Jr.
- Sean Rowe
- Anders Osborne
- Michael Franti (solo)
- Treetop Flyers
- Jay Blakesberg
- Chris Robinson Brotherhood
- Galadrielle Allman
- Ghost of a Saber Tooth Tiger
- Michael Franti & Spearhead
- Lucius
- The Allman Brothers Band

== 2015 ==
The 11th Mountain Jam took place at Hunter Mountain June 4-7. The stellar line-up included:

- The Black Keys
- Robert Plant and the Sensational Space Shifters
- Alabama Shakes
- Gov’t Mule
- Grace Potter and the Nocturnals
- moe.
- Michael Franti and Spearhead
- Big Gigantic
- Rebelution
- JRAD (Joe Russo’s Almost Dead)
- Railroad Earth
- Lake Street Dive
- Trigger Hippy
- Shakey Graves
- Benjamin Booker
- The Wailers
- Rusted Root
- Nicki Bluhm and the Gramblers
- Jon Cleary
- The Budos Band
- Dopapod
- Amy Helm and the Handsome Strangers
- Hurray for the RIff Raff
- Larry Campbell & Teresa Williams
- Marco Benevento
- The Mother Hips
- Nikki Lane
- Sons of Bill

== 2016 ==
The 12th annual Mountain Jam took place at Hunter Mountain, New York June 2-5. The festival line-up included:

- Beck
- Wilco
- The Avett Brothers
- Gov’t Mule
- Umphrey’s McGee
- Thievery Corporation
- Brandi Carlile
- Jason Isbell
- Gary Clark Jr.
- Michael Franti & Spearhead
- Chris Robinson Brotherhood
- Courtney Barnett
- Nathaniel Ratliff & The Night Sweats
- Lettuce
- Sister Sparrow & The Dirty Birds
- The New Mastersounds
- Third World
- Turkuaz
- Donna the Buffalo
- Son Little
- The London Souls
- Cabinet
- The Ballroom Thieves with Maine Youth Rock Orchestra
- And The Kids
- Love Cannon
- Marcus King Band
- Con Brio
- Jane Lee Hooker
- Copious Jones
- Madaila
- The Suitcase Junket
- The Paul Green Rock Academy

== 2017 ==
The 13th annual Mountain Jam again took place at Hunter Mountain, New York. It was Tom Petty and the Heartbreakers' last festival appearance. This was the complete line-up:

- Tom Petty and the Heartbreakers
- Steve Miller Band
- The String Cheese Incident
- Peter Frampton
- The Head and the Heart
- Gary Clark Jr.
- Michael Franti & Spearhead
- St. Paul & the Broken Bones
- The Strumbellas
- Matisyahu
- Shovels & Rope
- The Revivalists
- Amy Helm
- The Infamous Stringdusters
- White Denim
- Elephant Revival
- Lukas Nelson and Promise of the Real
- Moon Hooch
- Marty Stuart and His Fabulous Superlatives
- The Band of Heathens
- TAUK
- Nicole Atkins
- Sinkane
- Muddy Magnolias
- River Whyless
- Dan Bern
- Ari Hest
- Holly Bowling
- Andy Frasco and the U.N.
- Parsonsfield
- The National Reserve
- Ghosts of Paul Revere
- Hollis Brown
- Ryan Culwell
- Murali Coryell
- Simi Stone
- The Big Takeover
- The Paul Green Rock Academy
- Ratboy Jr.

== 2018 ==
The 14th Mountain Jam took place from Thursday, June 14 to Sunday, June 17, 2018 with the following acts:

Thursday

- Andy Frasco & The U.N.
- The Other Brothers
- 4 Gun Ridge
- Blueberry

Friday

- Sturgill Simpson
- Portugal. The Man
- Jenny Lewis
- Rag'n'Bone Man
- Turkuaz
- Chicano Batman
- Lewis Capaldi
- Steve Gunn
- Sarah Borges And The Broken Singles
- Woods
- Andy Frasco & The U.N.
- Jocelyn and Chris Arndt
- Mapache
- Sweet Marie
- Jane Lee Hooker
- Yard Sale

Saturday

- alt-J
- The War on Drugs
- The Decemberists
- George Clinton & Parliament Funkadelic
- The Record Company
- Anderson East
- The Felice Brothers
- Alice Merton
- Everything Everything
- Andy Frasco & The U.N.
- Thomas Wynn & The Believers
- The Stone Foxes
- Liz Vice
- Jack Broadbent
- Honeysuckle
- The Other Brothers
- Yard Sale
- Rock Academy
- Ratboy Jr.

Sunday

- Jack Johnson
- Father John Misty
- Kurt Vile & The Violators
- Mondo Cozmo
- Son Little
- Jade Bird
- John Craigie
- Eric Tessmer Band
- Larkin Poe
- Oliver Hazard
- Sydney Worthley
- Cicada Rhythm
- Rock Academy
- Ratboy Jr.

== 2019 ==
The 15th Annual Mountain Jam took place from June 13–16 at Bethel Woods Center For The Arts At The Historic Site of the 1969 Woodstock Festival.

- Willie Nelson & Family
- Gov’t Mule (2 sets)
- The Avett Brothers
- The Revivalists
- Joe Russo’s Almost Dead (2 sets)
- Dispatch
- Michael Franti & Spearhead
- Alison Krauss
- Lukas Nelson & The Promise of the Real
- Toots & The Maytals
- Twiddle
- Mandolin Orange
- Karl Denson’s Tiny Universe
- Sister Sparrow & The Dirty Birds
- Amy Helm
- Allman Betts Band
- Marco Benevento
- Andy Frasco & The U.N.
- The Dustbowl Revival
- The Nude Party
- Tyler Ramsey
- Mo Lowda & The Humble
- The National Reserve
- Brandon "Taz" Niederauer
- Consider the Source
- Mikaela Davis
- Hollis Brown
- Wild Adriatic
- Balkun Brothers
- The Big Takeover
- Stephen Lewis & The Big Band of Fun
- Bella's Bartok
- Sweet Marie
- Michael Glabicki & Friend

== 2020 ==
The 16th Annual Mountain Jam was scheduled to take place May 29-May 31, 2020 at Bethel Woods Center for the Arts. The event was cancelled on March 31 due to the COVID-19 outbreak. The scheduled line-up was:

Friday, May 29

- Trey Anastasio Band
- Jason Isbell And The 400 Unit
- Greensky Bluegrass
- Andy Frasco & The U.N.
- Kung Fu
- Midnight North
- Eggy
- Royal Khaoz
- Ciarra Fragale

Saturday, May 30

- Gov’t Mule (playing 2 sets)
- The Head And The Heart
- American Son: Levon Helm’s 80th Birthday Celebration ft. The Midnight Ramble Band and Very Special Guests
- Margo Price
- Hiss Golden Messenger
- Big Something
- Driftwood
- Stephen Lewis and the Big Band of Fun
- Diana DeMuth
- Hayley Jane and Friends feat. Reed Mathis, Michelangelo Caruba (Turkuaz) and Rob Compa (Dopapod)
- Caleb Hawley
- Jamie Drake

Sunday, May 31

- Brandi Carlile
- Grace Potter
- Michael Franti & Spearhead
- Yola
- Ghost of Paul Revere
- David Wax Museum
- Sammy Rae and the Friends
- Scruffy Pearls
- Wild Rivers
- Raye Zaragoza
- Kevin Daniel
- The Rock Academy

== 2025 ==
The Mountain Jam Back Alive in 2025, will take place on June 20-22, 2025 at Belleayre Mountain Ski Center, Highmount, New York. The line-up is to be announced.

== See also ==
- List of jam band music festivals
- List of reggae festivals
