= List of Grateful Dead members =

The following is a list of all the members of the Grateful Dead. The list does not include members of the various reunion projects.

== Members ==
=== Official members ===
- Jerry Garcia

Active: 1965–1995
Instruments: Lead and Rhythm guitar, lead and backing vocals
Other projects: Jerry Garcia Band, Jerry Garcia Acoustic Band, Legion of Mary, Reconstruction, Old & In the Way, New Riders of the Purple Sage

- Bob Weir

Active: 1965–1995
Instruments: Rhythm and Lead guitar, lead and backing vocals
Other projects: RatDog, Kingfish, Bobby and the Midnites, The Other Ones, The Dead, Furthur, Dead & Company

- Phil Lesh

Active: 1965–1995
Instruments: Bass guitar, backing and lead vocals
Other projects: Phil Lesh and Friends, The Other Ones, The Dead, Furthur

- Bill Kreutzmann

Active: 1965–1995
Instruments: Drums, percussion
Other projects: SerialPod, Rhythm Devils, The Other Ones, The Dead, BK3, 7 Walkers, Billy & the Kids, Dead & Company

- Ron "Pigpen" McKernan

Active: 1965 – June 17, 1972 (sick leave September–November 1971)
Instruments: Keyboards, harmonica, percussion, lead and backing vocals

- Mickey Hart

Active: September 29, 1967 – February 18, 1971; October 20, 1974 – 1995
Instruments: Drums, percussion
Other projects: Rhythm Devils, The Other Ones, The Dead, Mickey Hart Band, Dead & Company

- Tom Constanten

Active: November 23, 1968 – January 30, 1970
Instruments: Keyboards

- Keith Godchaux

Active: September 1971 – February 17, 1979
Instruments: Keyboards, backing vocals
Other projects: Jerry Garcia Band, Heart of Gold Band

- Donna Jean Godchaux

Active: December 31, 1971 – February 17, 1979 (maternity leave November–December 1973)
Instruments: Backing and lead vocals
Other projects: Jerry Garcia Band, Heart of Gold Band, Donna Jean Godchaux Band, Dark Star Orchestra

- Brent Mydland

Active: April 22, 1979 – July 23, 1990
Instruments: Keyboards, backing and lead vocals
Other projects: Bobby and the Midnites, Go Ahead

- Vince Welnick

Active: September 7, 1990 – 1995
Instruments: Keyboards, backing and lead vocals
Other projects: The Tubes, Missing Man Formation

=== Touring members ===
- Ned Lagin

Active: June – October 1974
Instruments: keyboards, electronics
Other projects: Seastones

- Bruce Hornsby

Active: September 1990 – March 1992
Instruments: keyboards, vocals
Other projects: Bruce Hornsby and the Range, Bruce Hornsby and the Noisemakers, The Other Ones, Ricky Skaggs & Bruce Hornsby, The Bruce Hornsby Trio

== Band lineups ==
Over a span of 30 years the Grateful Dead had various combinations of members, as shown in the table.

Grateful Dead lineups
Timespan	Members, instruments
June 1965 – September 1967	Jerry Garcia – lead guitar, vocals; Bob Weir – rhythm guitar, vocals; Ron "Pigpen" McKernan – keyboards, harmonica, percussion, vocals; Phil Lesh – bass, vocals; Bill Kreutzmann – drums
September 1967 – November 1968	Jerry Garcia – lead guitar, vocals; Bob Weir – rhythm guitar, vocals; Ron "Pigpen" McKernan – keyboards, harmonica, percussion, vocals; Phil Lesh – bass, vocals; Bill Kreutzmann – drums; Mickey Hart – drums
November 1968 – January 1970	Jerry Garcia – lead guitar, vocals; Bob Weir – rhythm guitar, vocals; Ron "Pigpen" McKernan – harmonica, percussion, keyboards, vocals; Tom Constanten – keyboards; Phil Lesh – bass, vocals; Bill Kreutzmann – drums; Mickey Hart – drums
January 1970 – February 1971	Jerry Garcia – lead guitar, vocals; Bob Weir – rhythm guitar, vocals; Ron "Pigpen" McKernan – keyboards, harmonica, percussion, vocals; Phil Lesh – bass, vocals; Bill Kreutzmann – drums; Mickey Hart – drums
February – October 1971	Jerry Garcia – lead guitar, vocals; Bob Weir – rhythm guitar, vocals; Ron "Pigpen" McKernan – keyboards, harmonica, percussion, vocals; Phil Lesh – bass, vocals; Bill Kreutzmann – drums
October 1971 – March 1972	Jerry Garcia – lead guitar, vocals; Bob Weir – rhythm guitar, vocals; Ron "Pigpen" McKernan – harmonica, percussion, keyboards, vocals; Keith Godchaux – keyboards; Phil Lesh – bass, vocals; Bill Kreutzmann – drums
March – June 1972	Jerry Garcia – lead guitar, vocals; Bob Weir – rhythm guitar, vocals; Ron "Pigpen" McKernan – harmonica, percussion, keyboards, vocals; Keith Godchaux – keyboards; Donna Jean Godchaux – vocals; Phil Lesh – bass; Bill Kreutzmann – drums
June 1972 – October 1974	Jerry Garcia – lead guitar, vocals; Bob Weir – rhythm guitar, vocals; Keith Godchaux – keyboards; Donna Jean Godchaux – vocals; Phil Lesh – bass; Bill Kreutzmann – drums; Touring musician: Ned Lagin – keyboards, electronics (June 1974 – October 1974)
October 1974 – February 1979	Jerry Garcia – lead guitar, vocals; Bob Weir – rhythm guitar, vocals; Keith Godchaux – keyboards; Donna Jean Godchaux – vocals; Phil Lesh – bass; Bill Kreutzmann – drums; Mickey Hart – drums; Touring musician: Ned Lagin – keyboards, electronics (October 1974)
April 1979 – July 1990	Jerry Garcia – lead guitar, vocals; Bob Weir – rhythm guitar, vocals; Brent Mydland – keyboards, vocals; Phil Lesh – bass, vocals; Bill Kreutzmann – drums; Mickey Hart – drums
September 1990 – August 1995	Jerry Garcia – lead guitar, vocals; Bob Weir – rhythm guitar, vocals; Vince Welnick – keyboards, vocals; Phil Lesh – bass, vocals; Bill Kreutzmann – drums; Mickey Hart – drums; Touring musician: Bruce Hornsby – keyboards, vocals (September 1990 – March 1992)
