= Overstep (album) =

2014 studio album by Mike Gordon

Studio album by Mike Gordon
- Released: February 25, 2014
- Genre: Rock
- Labels: Megaplum; ATO
- Producer: Paul Q. Kolderie

Mike Gordon chronology
The Egg (2013)	Overstep (2014)

Professional ratings
Review scores
Source	Rating
AllMusic	3.5/5 stars
Consequence of Sound	C+

Overstep is Phish bassist Mike Gordon’s fourth solo studio album, following Moss, The Green Sparrow, and Inside In. It was released on February 25, 2014, on Megaplum/ATO Records.

During a series of writing retreats in New England, Gordon and Scott Murawski collaborated on the songwriting for Overstep. For this album, Gordon entrusted the production to Paul Q. Kolderie (known for his work with Radiohead, Uncle Tupelo, and Pixies). He enlisted new musicians, such as drummer Matt Chamberlain (recognised for his work with Jon Brion and Fiona Apple). Phish fans may already be acquainted with "Yarmouth Road", a reggae-inspired track that debuted alongside "Say Something" during the band's Summer 2013 tour.

== Track listing ==
All songs written by Mike Gordon and Scott Murawski.

1. "Ether" (6:18)
2. "Tiny Little World" (4:50)
3. "Jumping" (3:28)
4. "Yarmouth Road" (4:41)
5. "Say Something" (3:57)
6. "Face" (5:08)
7. "Paint" (3:34)
8. "Different World" (4:05)
9. "Peel" (5:03)
10. "Long Black Line" (3:33)
11. "Surface" (4:43)

== Personnel ==
Musicians

- Mike Gordon
- Scott Murawski
- Matt Chamberlain
- Robert Walter
- Tom Cleary
- Brett Lanier

Production

- Produced and engineered by Paul Q. Kolderie
- Mastered by Fred Kevorkian
- Photography & Design by Chuck Anderson (No Pattern)
- Art Direction & Layout Design by Julia Mordaunt
