= 2006 Bonnaroo Music Festival =

The 2006 Bonnaroo music festival ran from June 15–18. The headliners for the 2006 festival included Radiohead, Tom Petty and the Heartbreakers, Beck, and Phil Lesh and Friends. The Preservation Hall Jazz Band was featured in their own tent for three days and nights. The festival reportedly sold over 80,000 tickets. Radiohead's Ed O'Brien has described the band's headlining set as one of their best performances.

== Lineup ==
=== June 15th ===
(artists listed from earliest to latest set times)

- This Tent:
  - I-Nine
  - The Wood Brothers
  - dios (malos)
  - Marah
  - Lucero - List on board at event 2am
- That Tent:
  - The Motet
  - The Cat Empire
  - DeVotchKa
  - Toubab Krewe
- The Other Tent:
  - David Ford
  - Matt Costa
  - Tortured Soul
  - Electric Eel Shock
- Sonic Stage:
  - Nug Jug
  - Gypsy Hands Tribal Belly Dance
  - Moonshine Still
- The Bonnaroo Comedy Theatre:
  - Vic Henley, Morgan Murphy, Jon Reep, Tom Papa, Demetri Martin
  - Patton Oswalt and Jasper Reed (2 sets)
- Cinema Tent:
  - Real Genius
  - Superman III
  - Mayor of the Sunset Strip
  - Walk the Line
  - 2006 NBA Finals Game Four
  - Star Wars: Episode III – Revenge of the Sith
  - The Shining
  - The Street Fighter

=== June 16th ===
(artists listed from earliest to latest set times)

- What Stage:
  - Steel Pulse
  - Oysterhead
  - Tom Petty and the Heartbreakers
- Which Stage:
  - World Party
  - Ben Folds
  - Bright Eyes
  - Death Cab for Cutie
- This Tent:
  - Robinella
  - Seu Jorge
  - Mike Gordon & Ramble Dove
  - Ricky Skaggs & Kentucky Thunder
  - Lyrics Born
  - Common
  - Blackalicious
- That Tent:
  - Andrew Bird
  - Devendra Barnhart
  - Nickel Creek
  - Cat Power and the Memphis Rhythm Band
  - My Morning Jacket
- The Other Tent:
  - Bettye LaVette
  - Donavon Frankenreiter
  - G. Love & Special Sauce
  - Robert Randolph & the Family Band
  - Umphrey's McGee
  - Disco Biscuits
- Sonic Stage:
  - I-Nine
  - DeVotchKa
  - The Wood Brothers featuring John Medeski & Kenny Wollesen
  - Toubab Krewe
  - World Party
  - Umphrey's McGee
  - Devendra Banhart
  - Steel Train
- The Bonnaroo Comedy Theatre:
  - Patton Oswalt and Jasper Reed (2 sets)
  - Vic Henley, Morgan Murphy, Jon Reep, Tom Papa, Demetri Martin (2 sets)
- Blue Room Café:
  - Vorcza
  - Eliot Morris
  - American Minor
- Troo Music Lounge:
  - Corn Mo
  - Tyler Ramsey
  - Hector Qirko Band
  - Die Nachtigallen
  - Bobby Bare Jr.
  - Samantha Stollenwerck
  - Hot Buttered Rum
  - Infradig
- Cinema Tent:
  - Electric Apricot: Quest for Festeroo
  - Everyone Stares: The Police Inside Out
  - She's the Man
  - Madagascar
  - King Kong
  - Wetlands Preserved
  - Superman III
  - Rosemary's Baby

=== June 17th ===
(artists listed from earliest to latest set times)

- What Stage:
  - The Neville Brothers
  - Elvis Costello & the Imposters featuring Allen Toussaint
  - Beck
  - Radiohead
- Which Stage:
  - The Magic Numbers
  - Buddy Guy
  - Damian "Jr. Gong" Marley
  - Cypress Hill
- This Tent:
  - Grace Potter and the Nocturnals
  - Steel Train
  - Rusted Root
  - Blues Traveler
  - Dr. John
  - Rebirth Brass Band
  - Ivan Neville's Dumpstaphunk
- That Tent:
  - Dungen
  - Clap Your Hands Say Yeah
  - Gomez
  - Les Claypool's Fancy Band
- The Other Tent:
  - Jackie Greene
  - Bill Frisell
  - Amadou & Mariam
  - Medeski Martin & Wood
  - Balkan Beat Box
  - The Dresden Dolls
  - Sasha
- Sonic Stage:
  - Tom Hamilton of Brothers Past
  - Les Claypool
  - Blues Traveler
  - Gomez
  - Moe
  - Jackie Greene
  - Buddy Guy
  - The Disco Biscuits
  - Dungen
- The Bonnaroo Comedy Theatre:
  - Lewis Black and Kjell Bjorgen (2 Sets)
- Blue Room Café:
  - Grayson Capps
  - Gran Bel Fisher
  - Phil Pollard & His Band of Humans
- Troo Music Lounge:
  - Trevor Hall
  - Mutemath
  - Zac Brown Band
  - Artvandalay
  - Tishamingo
  - The Avett Brothers
  - Garage Deluxe
- Cinema Tent:
  - Fan-Submitted Short Movies
  - USA vs. Italy
  - Neil Young: Heart of Gold
  - Eight Legged Freaks
  - Scarface (Widescreen Anniversary Edition)
  - Rocky IV
  - Real Genius
  - Walk the Line

=== June 18th ===
(artists listed from earliest to latest set times)

- What Stage:
  - Col. Bruce Hampton & the Codetalkers
  - Béla Fleck and the Flecktones
  - Moe
  - Phil Lesh and Friends
- Which Stage:
  - Brothers Past
  - Sierra Leone's Refugee All Stars
  - Matisyahu
  - Bonnie Raitt
- This Tent:
  - Mike Doughty's Band
  - Soulive
  - The Streets
  - Atmosphere
- That Tent:
  - Be Your Own Pet
  - Deadboy & the Elephantmen
  - Stephen Malkmus and the Jicks
  - Sonic Youth
- The Other Tent:
  - Shooter Jennings
  - Jerry Douglas
  - Son Volt
  - Steve Earle
- Sonic Stage:
  - Matisyahu
  - Andrew Bird
  - Rusted Root
  - Mike Doughty's Band
  - Jerry Douglas
  - Eric Krasno and Reggie Watts of Soulive
  - Béla Fleck and the Flecktones
- The Bonnaroo Comedy Theatre:
  - Lewis Black and Kjell Bjorgen
- Blue Room Café:
  - JD & the Straight Shot
  - The Rockwells
  - Tim Lee Band
- Troo Music Lounge:
  - Abigail Washburn
  - Leslie Woods
  - Mitch Rutman Group
  - Bojones
- Cinema Tent:
  - Before the Music Dies
  - Press On
  - Sierra Leone's Refugee All Stars
  - Star Wars: Episode III – Revenge of the Sith
  - 2006 NBA Finals Game Five

== Superjam ==
(Core band members only, guests not included)

Trey Anastasio (guitar), Mike Gordon (guitar), Phil Lesh (bass), Marco Benevento (organ, keyboards), Joe Russo (drums)
