= The Green Sparrow =

Studio album by Mike Gordon
- Released: August 5, 2008
- Genre: Rock
- Label: Rounder
- Producer: Mike Gordon, John Siket, Jared Slomoff

Mike Gordon chronology
| Live From Bonnaroo 2005 (2005) | The Green Sparrow (2008) | Moss (2010) |

Professional ratings
Aggregate scores
| Source | Rating |
|---|---|
| Metacritic | 64/100 |
Review scores
| Source | Rating |
| AllMusic | 4/5 stars |

The Green Sparrow is the second solo album from Phish bassist Mike Gordon, released August 5, 2008. It is his first solo album in five years (since 2003's Inside In). Gordon has also released a pair of studio albums with acoustic guitarist Leo Kottke, a live album with the experimental Benevento-Russo Duo, and a live DVD with Grateful Dead offshoot Rhythm Devils.

Gordon dedicated all of 2007 to writing The Green Sparrow while taking a yearlong hiatus from touring. It was recorded at the end of 2007 and into 2008 in his home recording studio in Vermont and features guest appearances from Bill Kreutzmann, Trey Anastasio, Chuck Leavell, Page McConnell, Ivan Neville and others. A 2008 Summer Tour to support the album began in July 2008 and stretched into September with Gordon backed by Max Creek guitarist Scott Murawski, keyboardist Tom Cleary, drummer Todd Isler, and percussionist Craig Myers. As of 2018, only Murawski and Myers remain from Gordon's original 2003 touring band.

== Track listing ==
1. "Another Door" – 3:40
2. "Voices" – 5:20
3. "Dig Further Down" – 4:01
4. "Pretend" – 4:09
5. "Traveled Too Far" – 4:33
6. "Andelmans' Yard" – 6:13
7. "Morphing Again" – 3:38
8. "Radar Blip" – 5:05
9. "Jaded" – 3:08
10. "Sound" – 4:38

All songs written by Mike Gordon

== Bonus tracks ==
1. "Doing It Anyway" (at iTunes)
2. "Be Careful What You Wish For" (at Rhapsody)

== Personnel ==
=== Musicians ===
- Mike Gordon – vocals, bass, guitar, keyboards, hi-hat, tambourine, drum programming, piano, Clucky
- Trey Anastasio – guitar
- Doug Belote – drums, cowbell, shaker, V-Drums
- Russ Lawton – drums
- Ivan Neville – organ
- Page McConnell – organ
- Nadine LaFond – vocals
- Jared Slomoff – vocals, cowbell
- Joe Russo – drums
- Chuck Leavell – organ
- Steve Ferraris – bongos, Danmo, cowbell
- Bill Kreutzmann – drums
- Scott Murawski – acoustic guitar
- Ken Lovelett – tambourine
- Aaron Johnson – trombone
- Jordan McLean – trumpet
- Cochemea Gastelum – saxophone
- Julee Avallone – flute
- Marie Claire – vocals

=== Production ===
- Produced by Mike Gordon, John Siket, Jared Slomoff
- Recorded and Mixed by John Siket
- Mastered by Fred Kevorkian
- Cover Illustration/Hand-Lettering by Mike Gordon
- Design/Layout by Julia Mordaunt
