= Cheers Elephant =

American indie rock band

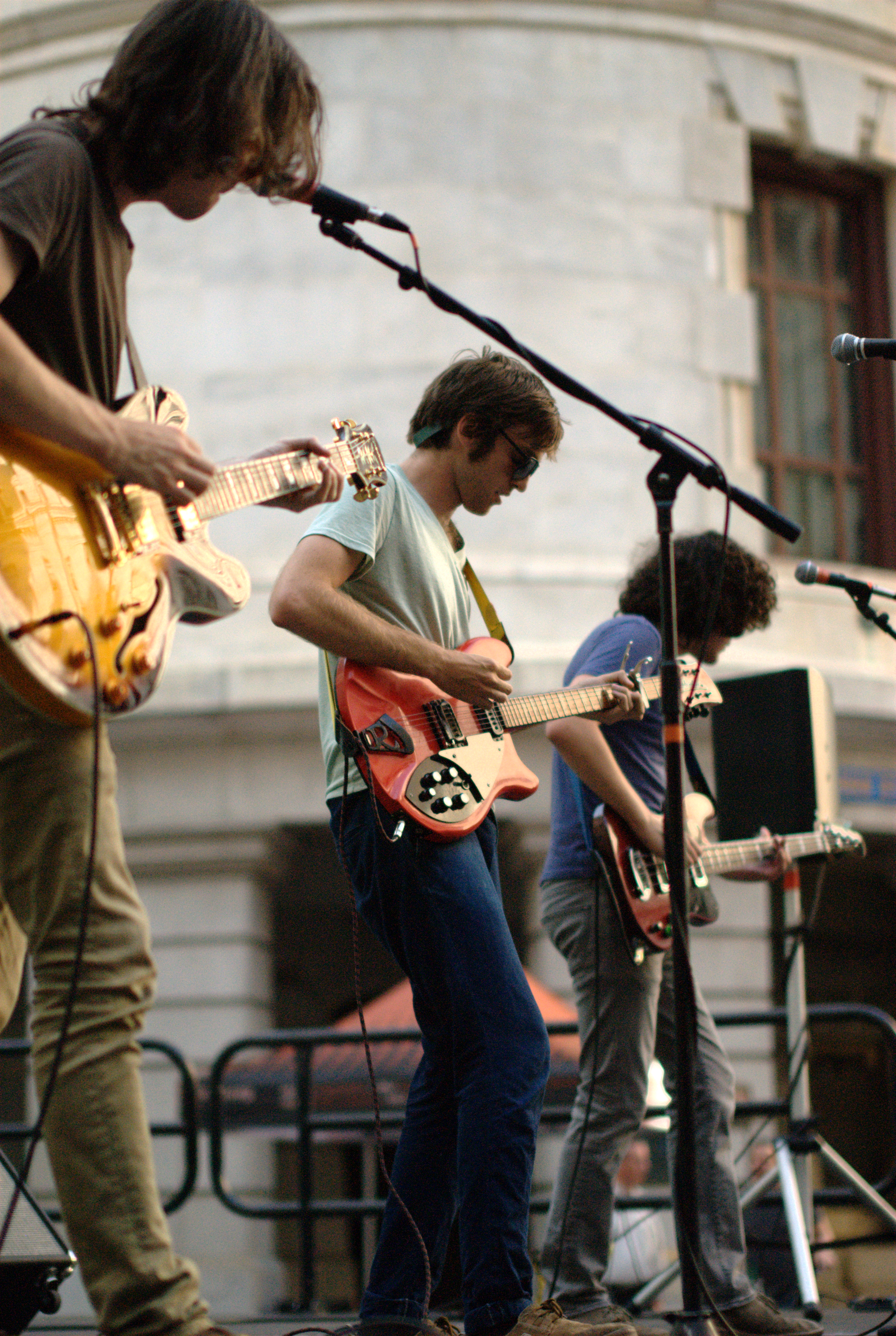
- Cheers Elephant in Philadelphia in 2013

Background information
- Origin: Philadelphia, Pennsylvania
- Genres: Indie pop, rock, psychedelic
- Years active: 2007–present
- Members: Jordan del Rosario Robert King Derek Krzywicki Matt Rothstein (Travelin' Mat)
- Website: www.cheerselephant.com

Cheers Elephant is an American indie pop and psychedelic rock band from Philadelphia, Pennsylvania. Since its inception in 2007, members have consisted of lead singer and guitarist Derek Krzywicki, lead guitarist Jordan Del Rosario, bassist “Travelin’ Matt” Rothstein and drummer Robert King. In late 2013, the band relocated to Southern California.

== Career ==
The band’s beginnings revolved around a satellite facility of the Paul Green School of Rock in Downingtown, PA, where Rothstein and Del Rosario also taught bass and guitar respectively. Franchised by Rothstein’s parents, the school served as a central hub for recording, rehearsal and performance.

The group launched their third album, Like Wind Blows Fire in May 2012, playing the Apple Store in Philadelphia for the official release. Reviewing the album, Jedd Beaudoin said "Cheers Elephant should be a staple of radio and coffee shop conversations by the end of the decade." The band has done multiple national tours and completed a 12-show stint at South by Southwest music festival.

The band's music has been described as "Chew it up, Spit it out, Rock and Roll". Krzywicki claims the band’s composition style takes shape from influences like the Beatles, the Kinks and the Beach Boys combined with a “streets of Philadelphia kind of sound.”

The band's main songwriter, Derek Krzywicki, left the group in November 2014 , but the band has continued on after that as a trio.

The band self-released three albums between 2008 and 2012 and in 2017 was working on their fourth. That album, "Stonemasters", was released on 24 November 2017 and contained a mix of new material and rerecorded tracks written earlier in the band's life.

Reuniting in 2020 for a two week tour of China, the original lineup played a pre-tour/warmup show in LA on Feb 20, 2020 before COVID-19 shut the whole world down, canceling the before mentioned Chinese tour and all future dates.

== Discography ==
Studio albums

- Cheers Elephant (2008)
- Man Is Nature (2011)
- Like Wind Blows Fire (2012)
- Stonemasters (2017)

Singles

- Speak Think (2015)
- Airliner (2015)
- Steak Knife (2015)
- Shake It (2016)
- Suitcase (2016)
