= Murawski =

Murawski (feminine: Murawska; plural: Murawscy) is a Polish surname. Notable people with the surname include:

- Alfred Murawski, pen name of Alfred Szklarski (1912–1992), Polish author
- Bob Murawski (born 1964), American film editor
- Maciej Murawski (born 1974), Polish footballer
- Rafał Murawski (born 1981), Polish footballer
- Radosław Murawski (born 1994), Polish footballer
- Scott Murawski (born 1956), American musician
- Shaun Murawski, Scottish photographer
