= Trichrome =

Trichrome may refer to:

- Trichrome staining, a histological staining method
- Trichromacy, three color vision
- Trichromes, an album by the Trichromes

== Three-color systems ==
- CMY color model
- RGB color model
- RYB color model
