= Outside Out =

2000 film by Mike Gordon

- Directed by: Mike Gordon
- Produced by: Jeff Lawson
- Starring: Mike Gordon; Bruce Hampton; Ashley Scott Shamp; Jimi Stout
- Cinematography: Mike Gordon
- Edited by: Mike Gordon
- Release date: 2000
- Language: English

Outside Out is the first full-length feature film from Phish bassist Mike Gordon. It premiered at South by Southwest in 2000 and starred Jimi Stout, Col. Bruce Hampton, Ashley Scott Shamp, Gordon, and others.

The film revolves around the life of confused teenager Rick, who begins taking guitar lessons from Hampton. Hampton's unorthodox style of teaching infuriates Rick's parents, who insists he attend military school. Rick later meets the guitarist of country music group "Ramble Dove" (Gordon), and the true bizarreness of the film begins to take shape.

The movie features a mixture of abstract editing, psychedelic symbolic images, and music later featured on Gordon's companion album, Inside In.
