= Backbone (Backbone album) =

Studio album by Backbone
- Released: January 13, 1998
- Recorded: 1997
- Genre: Blues-rock
- Length: 51:17
- Label: Grateful Dead
- Producer: Rick Barnett

Bill Kreutzmann chronology
The Apocalypse Now Sessions (1980)	Backbone (1998)	Trichromes (2002)

Professional ratings
Review scores
Source	Rating
Allmusic	3/5 stars
The Music Box	2/5 stars

Backbone is an album by the rock band Backbone. Their only album, it was released by Grateful Dead Records on January 13, 1998. It contains ten original songs, plus a version of the Grateful Dead tune "New Speedway Boogie".

Backbone was a trio of Rick Barnett on guitar, Edd Cook on bass, and former Grateful Dead member Bill Kreutzmann on drums Their music was heavily influenced by blues and R&B, and included substantial amounts of improvisational jamming.

== Track listing ==
1. "Preserve the Blues" (Rick Barnett) – 4:34
2. "Sittin' Here Thinkin'" (Barnett, Philbrick) – 3:03
3. "Make Me Laugh" (Barnett) – 6:27
4. "Breathe Deeply" (Barnett) – 4:42
5. "Nothing's Different" (Edd Cook) – 3:26
6. "Fly Away" (Barnett, Bill Kreutzmann, Cook) – 4:10
7. "Only Son" (Barnett, Kreutzmann, Brandon) – 5:51
8. "New Speedway Boogie" (Jerry Garcia, Robert Hunter) – 5:47
9. "Stayed Away Too Long" (Barnett) – 4:12
10. "Earthchild (Barnett, Kreutzmann) – 3:45
11. "Ocean Laughter" (Barnett, Kreutzmann, Becker) – 4:52

== Personnel ==
=== Backbone ===
- Rick Barnett – guitar, vocals
- Edd Cook – bass, saxophone, vocals
- Bill Kreutzmann – drums

=== Additional musicians ===
- Janice Barnett – background vocals
- Michael Ruff – Hammond organ, piano
- Bruce Harris – Hammond organ
- Nadia Deleye – background vocals on "New Speedway Boogie"

=== Production ===
- Rick Barnett – producer, recording
- Casey Jones – second engineer
- John Cutler – mixing
- Jeffrey Norman – mixing
- Joe Gastwirt – mastering
- Steve Parish – crew
- Billy Grillo – crew
- Ken Friedman – photography
- John Werner – photography
- Todd Michael – photography
- Amy Finkle – package design
