= School of Rock (company) =

Music education program

- Type: Franchisor
- Industry: Music education
- Founded: 1998; 28 years ago in Philadelphia, Pennsylvania
- Headquarters: Canton, Massachusetts
- Number of locations: 400 schools in the US; 91 International; 16 Countries
- Key people: Stacey Ryan (president)
- Products: Performance Program, Rock 101, Rookies, Little Wing, House Band, All Stars Program, Adult Program, guitar lessons, bass lessons, vocal lessons, keyboard lessons, music camps
- Services: music lessons, guitar lessons, bass guitar lessons, drum lessons, keyboard lessons, vocal lessons
- Website: schoolofrock.com

School of Rock is a music education program. It is a for-profit educational company that operates and franchises after-school music instruction schools in the United States, Chile, Canada, Brazil, Peru, Colombia, South Africa, Mexico, Australia, Paraguay, Taiwan, Ireland, Spain, Portugal, Uruguay, the United Kingdom & Germany. School of Rock currently has more than 450 open locations in sixteen countries serving more than 80,000 students.

Though they offer a pre-school introduction to music for children age two through six, the majority of their students are in a performance-based program where students are accepted at any skill level, with the goal of getting them on stage, playing a concert before a paying audience. The most skilled students in each school form a band and play concerts in their city, and the top students from each school compete to become a member of an "AllStar" band and tour regionally. They have recently expanded to offer career development for working bands, and adult programs for adult amateur musicians. Successful musicians occasionally serve as "Guest Professors" and perform with the students. Some School of Rock graduates have gone on to appear on shows like American Idol and The Voice.

== History ==
Paul Green began giving traditional individual music lessons in his home in 1996. He invited a group of his students to sit in, or "jam", with his own band with disappointing results. But by the third week, he found that the students who played in a group had advanced much more than the students who received only traditional solo instruction. He modified his teaching method to supplement traditional instruction with group practice, with the goal of putting on a concert. He compared it to the difference between "...shooting hoops and playing basketball". In 1999, the most advanced students played their first public concert at an art gallery.

He took out a loan for $7000 in 2002 and established a permanent location for the first Paul Green School of Rock Music in a dilapidated building at 1320 Race Street, Philadelphia that has since been demolished. The location had a number of small rooms for individual instrumental instruction as well as larger performance spaces for full band practices. Spin magazine sent The Smashing Pumpkins guitarist James Iha to profile Green and the school for the May 2002 issue. Green chose to name the school after himself to avoid confusion with the Herbie Hancock television program and to use his measure of local fame, but always referred to the program as "Rock School" and answered the phone using the phrase. Additionally, Green established the domain SchoolofRock.com in 2001, first archived 24 May 2002.

In 2002, a crew from the Viacom television channel VH1 filmed for four days at the Philadelphia location for a proposed reality television series. After the shoot, the producers stopped returning Green's phone calls. In January 2003, filmmakers Don Argott and Sheena M. Joyce attended a concert by the students, and decided to make a documentary about the school five minutes after the concert started. They met with Green the next day and began shooting video one day later, intending to follow an entire school year. Midway through the nine months of shooting what became Rock School, they learned that the Viacom movie studio Paramount would be releasing a fictional film to be called School of Rock featuring Jack Black as Dewey Finn, a would-be rock star teaching children to play rock music. Many critics claimed that Black's characterization was based on Green's man-child persona though screenwriter Mike White claimed that he had "...never heard of Paul Green before". Green preferred the documentary, saying that while School of Rock "was actually, businesswise, way better for us because people actually saw that movie," the documentary "opened a lot of other doors, corporate partnerships, and [gave] us access to the rock stars that we play with. It was like Jack Black was the nationwide commercial for us and our movie [the documentary] was the industry cred." He considered a lawsuit, but decided against it, reasoning that the School benefited from the film saying "I considered suing, but what are you going to do? It's better, in a karmic sense, to just reap the rewards."

School of Rock magazine

Green was bought out in 2009 by investor Sterling Partners and the management team he had brought in, headed by former Clear Channel executive Matt Ross. Ross remained CEO until 2010, managing the company's expansion and private equity acquisition, when he was replaced as CEO by former McDonald's Ventures executive Chris Catalano, who had previously led the expansion of their Chipotle and Redbox businesses. The name was shortened to School of Rock and Paul Green exited the organization.

In June 2014, Catalano was replaced with Dzana Homan, who had been Chief Operating Officer of the Goddard School child care centers, and had previous experience as CEO of Huntington Learning Centers and Futurekids.

In April 2006, Guitar Player magazine publisher MPN announced a quarterly School of Rock magazine intended to focus on classic rock and musical tips for readers age twelve to eighteen. It lasted less than a year, closing during a contraction of the publishing industry.

In 2017, Rob Price joined the company as CEO. Prior to School of Rock, he was the president of Edible Arrangements. In 2023, Price received the New England Entrepreneur of the Year Award.

In 2019, partnered with Berklee to empower and promote gender diversity in the industry for young women musicians by providing full scholarships to a group of six women from School of Rock.

In 2021, School of Rock opened their first European location in Madrid. This opening marked the beginning of School of Rock's expansion into Spain, Brazil, and Portugal. In 2024, School of Rock announced their UK expansion, led by franchisor Matias Puga-Hamilton who steered School of Rock's growth in Latin America. In 2025, School of Rock announced their expansion into Germany. Also, in 2025, School of Rock announced the opening of their 400th location.

In 2022, School of Rock partnered with a nonprofit Music Will, to open up more opportunities for kids to learn.

In 2024, Youth Enrichment Brands acquired School of Rock, and Stacey Ryan became president of School of Rock.

In 2025, the online magazine Air Mail published allegations by former students on inappropriate behavior by company founder Paul Green during his tenure, such as punching students, giving beers to minors, showing pornography, kissing male students on the lips, and routinely inquiring about students' sex lives. Paul Green has had no affiliation with School of Rock since 2010.

== Awards & accolades ==
At the 2021 and 2022 Global Franchise Awards, School of Rock was named the Best Children's Service and Education Franchise. A year later, School of Rock was named Grand Champion at the 2023 Global Franchise Awards, the most prestigious award at the ceremony.

At the 2023 She Rock Awards, Stacey Ryan, then COO of School of Rock, was the Champion Award honoree. An all-girl School of Rock band performed at the ceremony after Ryan accepted her award.

In 2024, Entrepreneur Magazine named School of Rock the 12th best children's franchise.

In February 2024, Jason Kline and Cecilia Yi-Kline were recognized as 2023 Franchisees of the year at the 64th IFA Annual Convention.

== Franchising ==
School of Rock in Shorewood, Wisconsin

A review by Entrepreneur magazine ranked School of Rock #118 of their 2025 Top 500 Franchise Opportunities, up from #211 in 2013. Additionally, the CNN Money website featured School of Rock as one of their Five Hot Franchises on 12 February 2013.

The company has grown to more than 400 locations worldwide.

As of April 2025, purchasing a franchise requires, on average, an initial investment of $425,250 to $704,800. This estimate includes a renewable ten-year franchise fee of $59,900. The franchisee also pays an 8% annual royalty fee and is required to have a net worth of $350,000, and $150,000 cash available. The majority of the employees are music teachers who are also working musicians.

The franchisee receives training in running the business, IT support (including a website), assistance with real estate selection and designing the franchise location, grand opening and on-going marketing support, discounts on music equipment and a protected territory. The IT support includes access to a customized task management and internal social productivity site.

== Curriculum ==
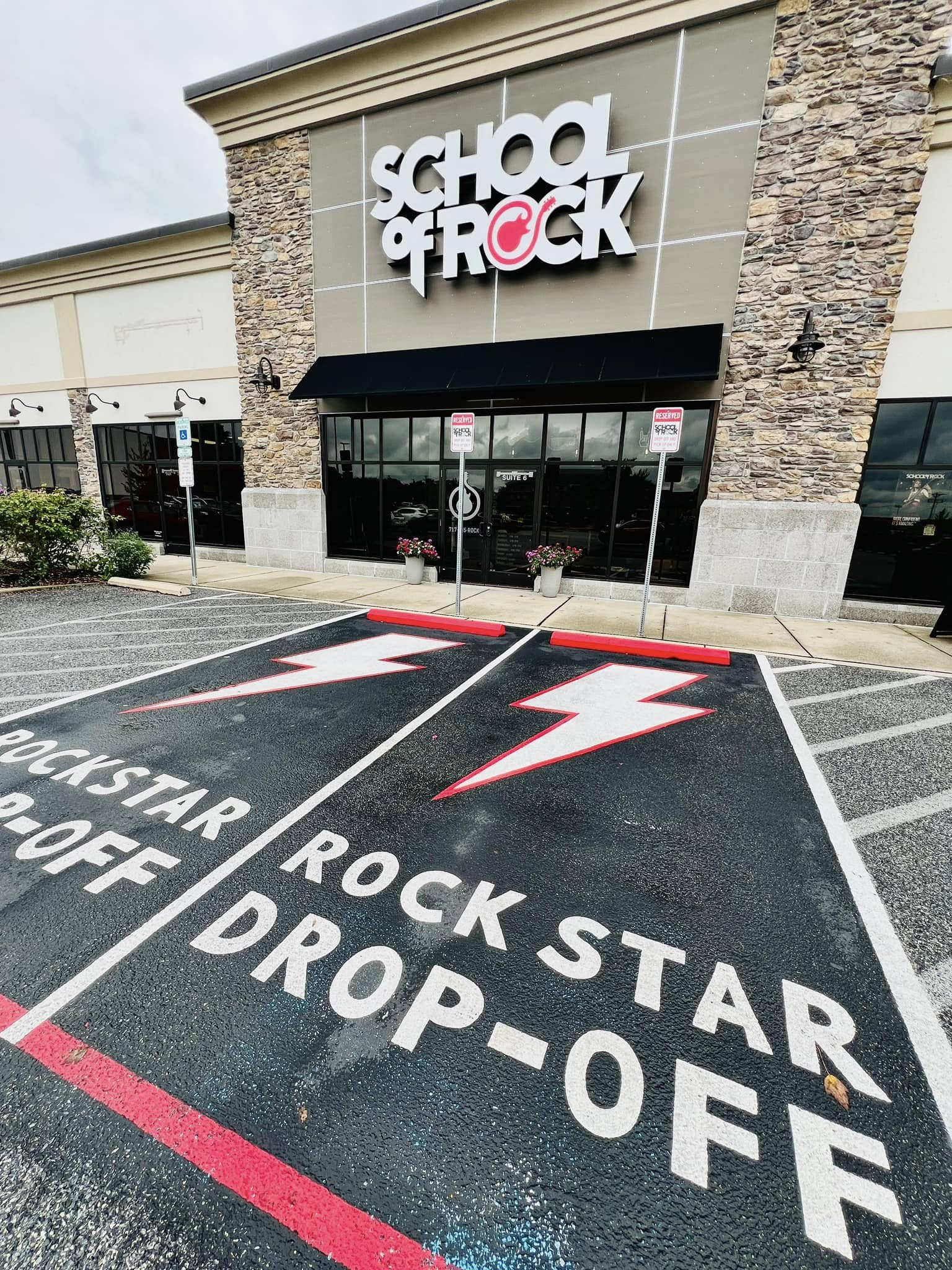
School of Rock in York, PA

The schools operate year-round, offering a variety of programs. Throughout the year, they offer lessons and performance groups, which can be on either weekdays or weekends. During summer, winter and spring breaks, they offer various day camps for intensive instruction.

The Burnsville, Minnesota, location originated an early childhood music education known as "Little Wing", after the Jimi Hendrix song.

At age seven, students can begin weekly lessons in the instrument of their choice in "Rock 101" classes. After "Rock 101", students can move to the "Performance Program" where they have a weekly one-on-one private lesson and three hours weekly of group band rehearsal that culminates in a concert before an audience.

In 2021, School of Rock was awarded U.S. Patent for its revolutionary School Of Rock Method.

The most skilled students at each school form a band and perform at various venues in their city, opening for established regional and national acts. Less than 1% of the total School of Rock population gets selected to the AllStars program. Many schools have songwriting and recording programs as well. School of Rock launched their songwriting program in 2020 during the Covid-19 pandemic, which worked well with the remote learning format.

Most school instructors are working musicians with ongoing careers in rock music and a number are graduates of the program. Instructors are encouraged to stress the fundamentals of both popular music and music theory, using songs from popular bands and artists like Led Zeppelin, The Who, Pink Floyd, and music from genres such as 1980s glam metal, punk rock and grunge. The teachers often specialize in a single instrument, though many have skills in additional instruments and students are encouraged to learn multiple instruments. Instruction is available in electric guitar, bass guitar, drums, keyboards and vocals.

The students are paired with others of similar abilities to form bands and assigned a band coach. Dependence upon their peers is credited with being more effective than their own parents at ensuring practice discipline.

There are occasional "Guest Professor" workshops featuring professional musicians, which include discussions about past experiences, songwriting, live performances, and handling fame. Previous guest professors include Jon Anderson, Earl Slick, Dave Stewart, Mike Watt, former Santana drummer Michael Shrieve Peter Frampton, Roger Waters, Jackson Browne and Zakk Wylde. The guest may also spend time assisting the students on their technique and may perform a concert with the students.

Most locations offer an adult program for those older than 18 who wish to participate in a performance based music education program. Private lessons are followed by professionally guided rehearsals leading up to a pair of full length concerts.

Locations take advantage of local music opportunities. In 2014, School of Rock Chicago cooperated with The Second City to produce a production of Tommy by The Who. The Portland location has an annual concert of music by Portland bands called Best! of Portland.

Fees vary depending on program participation and school location, but it is in the range of "a couple hundred dollars a month." The School has partnered with MySafeSchool to ensure the safety of their students.

In 2021, School of Rock partnered with Gibson to create a limited-edition Les Paul Special electric guitar. Only 100 of the guitars were made and sold exclusively to School of Rock students.

== Performances ==
The students have "the ultimate goal of performing live in front of real crowds" and a motto often heard is "To inspire the world to rock…on stage and in life". The founder of the school stated in the documentary about the school "Don't come to watch kids play music. Come to watch kids play music well".

The school year consists of up to three seasons, each composed of up to five different theme shows (depending on the size of the branch). Each show is dedicated to a particular artist, band, genre, time period or historical event. Although some shows are more technically demanding, students can sign up for any show no matter what the age or skill level (although approval by the show's director is occasionally required). Shows usually consist of 20 to 25 songs chosen by the show's director (usually one of the teachers at the school) to make a ninety-minute concert. Rehearsals are held every week in preparation. The shows are performed at local clubs and venues; however, some of the schools have their own venue for performances.

Previously performed shows across all School of Rock locations include Metallica's Master of Puppets, Classic metal, Indie rock, The Black Keys vs. The White Stripes, Santana, Guns N' Roses vs. Mötley Crüe, Led Zeppelin, Queen, The Beatles, Jimi Hendrix, Pink Floyd's The Wall, Reggae, Funk & Soul, Radiohead, Eagles vs. Fleetwood Mac, Rocky Horror vs. Hedwig, Best of the 80s/90s/00s, Punk rock, Jesus Christ Superstar, The Who's Tommy, British Invasion, Old School Blues, Women Who Rock, The Doors, Grunge, Alice in Chains vs Pearl Jam, Rush, Red Hot Chili Peppers, David Bowie, Prince, Green Day, Talking Heads, and many more.

Some locations produce a Best of Season show that is a compilation of songs from previous shows, usually to raise tuition for a scholarship fund. Locations are a mixture of franchised and company-operated, some having been established as independent entities prior to the founding of the Paul Green School of Rock Music and maintain their own traditions and values.

On 28 June 2013, a multi-day competition was launched at Milwaukee's Summerfest music festival. Bands from 200 School of Rock locations traveled to compete in a Battle of Bands. In 2023, School of Rock students returned to compete at Summerfest after the Covid-19 pandemic. This event happens annually.

During the pandemic in 2020, School of Rock students performed "Three Little Birds" and recorded a compilation music video with Skip Marley.

In 2022, School of Rock students performed at the Rock in Rio festival in Lisbon, Portugal.

== AllStars ==
The School of Rock AllStars is a select group of students comprising less than 1 percent of the students in the program, selected via an audition process where the student submits a five-minute video clip. The student answers four questions: "What is your favorite thing about School of Rock?", "What is your best School of Rock moment?", "How has music changed your life?", and "Why do you want to be an AllStar?". They must also include a performance of one Led Zeppelin, Beatles, or Rolling Stones song, and one solo song of their own choice. Originally, there was a single national AllStars team, but since expanding the number of schools, there are AllStar teams for six different regions.

Once chosen, the students practice together during the school holiday period. They tour such venues as the Whisky a Go Go and The Roxy in Los Angeles, The Cutting Room in New York, Stubbs in Austin, various Hard Rock Cafes and House of Blues, the Rock and Roll Hall of Fame and many of the biggest festivals in the country such as Lollapalooza, Summerfest, and Austin City Limits.

The 2010 AllStars tour was billed as "Live-Aid Remade" with a set list drawn from the original Live Aid concert 25 years previously.

They often tour and play with successful rock musicians, such as the Butthole Surfers, Slash, Les Paul, Brendon Small, LeAnn Rimes, Perry Farrell, Jon Anderson, Peter Frampton, Eddie Vedder, Alice Cooper, Adrian Belew, Napoleon Murphy Brock, Stewart Copeland, John Wetton, Jeff "Skunk" Baxter, Ike Willis and Ann Wilson.

The AllStars program raises funds for the Society for the Prevention of Teen Suicide.

In June 2023, nearly 700 students from more than 60 School of Rock locations from seven countries performed at Summerfest Festival at The Rave.

In July 2024, AllStars nationwide tour was started visiting 30 cities across the U.S.
