= Max Creek =

American rock band

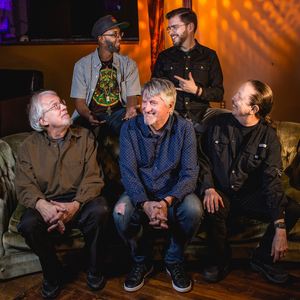

Background information
- Origin: Connecticut, USA
- Genres: Rock; Jam Band; Progressive Rock; Psychedelic Rock
- Years active: 1971–Present
- Labels: One Of Nineteen Records; Telefunken; Relix Records; Wranger Records
- Members: John Rider; Scott Murawski; Mark Mercier; Bill Carbone; Jamemurrell Stanley
- Past members: Dave Reed; Bob Gosselin; Amy Fazzano; Rob Fried; Greg DeGuglielmo; Greg Vasso; Scott Allshouse
- Website: www.maxcreek.com

Max Creek is an American rock band formed in Hartford, Connecticut, in 1971. A significant presence in the New England music scene, Max Creek is known as a pioneering "jam band." For over fifty years they have regularly performed at various iconic venues and music festivals, showcasing their live performances. Members of Max Creek have collaborated with and opened for notable artists and members of prominent acts, including: Leon Russell, Bruce Hornsby, Phish, The Band, Talking Heads, Jefferson Airplane, The Allman Brothers Band, and Grateful Dead.

== History ==
Max Creek was founded in the spring of 1971 by Dave Reed and John Rider, students at Hartt College of Music in Hartford, Connecticut. Reed, a trumpet instructor, met Rider through teaching, discovering their shared interest in American folk music and original songwriting. In the fall of 1971, Rider joined Reed at Hartt College of Music. Both musicians were proficient in various instruments, including trumpet, guitar, and bass guitar.

After starting their semester, Reed and Rider began rehearsing in the basement of Rider's fraternity house in Hartford. In early 1972, Bob Gosselin, a high school friend of Reed, joined as a drummer, completing the trio. Initially focusing on folk, singer-songwriter, and country rock genres, they later adopted the name "Max Creek," inspired by a location in Virginia associated with Rider's relatives. In 1972 the band relocated to a rehearsal space in Feeding Hills, Massachusetts. In late spring 1972, Dave Reed invited his 15-year-old music student, Scott Murawski, to join them during a rehearsal, introducing an electric guitar element to their sound.

Murawski's initial involvement with the band ended abruptly when he was banned from a Hartford club for being underage. Despite this setback, Max Creek continued performing in the Hartford area. In 1973, founder Dave Reed fell ill with appendicitis, leading to Mark Mercier temporarily joining on keyboards. At this time the band was covering songs that the Grateful Dead had also been covering, without knowing it. Due to the similarities in their musical approach, the band became influenced by bands like the Grateful Dead, such as The Allman Brothers Band, and The Band. Once the band gained momentum by performing at venues frequently, their sound evolved to incorporate more improvisation and electrified sound.

Their musical direction was significantly influenced by attending "Summer Jam" at Watkins Glen, New York, in the summer of 1973. The psychedelic music experienced there heavily shaped Max Creek's sound and style, resembling that of the San Francisco Bay scene. Scott Murawski rejoined as lead guitarist, while Reed shifted to rhythm guitar before eventually leaving the band to pursue solo ventures in bluegrass, country rock, and acoustic ragtime music. Keyboardist Mark Mercier remained a permanent member throughout these transitions.

Max Creek's early history saw significant developments in personnel and musical direction. In 1976, the band welcomed Amy "Barefoot" Fazzano as lead vocalist, discovered by keyboardist Mark Mercier during her employment at a venue frequented by the band. Fazzano's addition infused Max Creek with new energy, inspiring the group to expand their repertoire with original compositions and covers featuring her distinct vocal style. The following year in 1977 the band released its first album, self-titled "Max Creek".

During this period, Max Creek frequented venues affiliated with the University of Hartford and various smaller Hartford-area locations, steadily building their local following. In 1979, the band underwent a pivotal transformation with the addition of drummer and percussionist Rob Fried, enhancing their sonic landscape with a dual-drummer setup reminiscent of iconic bands like the Grateful Dead and the Allman Brothers Band. This lineup change marked a turning point in Max Creek's musical evolution, propelling their popularity throughout the early 1980s, particularly during the winter months when touring acts like the Grateful Dead were on hiatus.

By 1983, Amy Fazzano departed from the band to prioritize her family life but would sit-in during performances often, while Bob Gosselin also stepped down in 1985 to focus on personal and professional commitments. Greg DeGuglielmo then replaced Gosselin as drummer and vocalist, contributing to Max Creek's evolving sound throughout the late 1980s and into 1991. In the late 1980s, Max Creek achieved peak popularity, maintaining a rigorous schedule of more than 250 performances annually. However, in the early 1990s, they chose to significantly reduce their touring schedule to focus on their families. The band faced a significant setback due to the departure of sound engineer John Archer and what was dubbed by band members as his "Crystal Clear" sound system, known colloquially as "Quack Sound", in the early 1990s. This led to a decision for Max Creek to stop touring at a time when the jam band scene was gaining momentum.

The band influenced a new generation of touring musicians. Mike Gordon once sent his father to record a Max Creek show with his gear while he was in college in the early 1980s before forming Phish. Gordon then annotated and transcribed a guitar solo of Scott Murawski's from the live recording and presented it to Murawski. Guster drummer Brian Rosenworcel was an outspoken fan growing up.

Max Creek notably put on an annual music festival at Indian Lookout Country Club in upstate New York, dubbed "Camp Creek", and was one of the longest running festivals on the East Coast when it took a hiatus in 2008. Camp Creek was held in Maine in 2011, and returned to Indian Lookout Country Club in 2014. After another hiatus, Camp Creek was held in 2019 at Odetah Camping Resort in Bozrah, Connecticut.

Max Creek has cultivated a dedicated fan base, known as "Creek Freaks" throughout their tenure as a band. This is owed to the close connection fans feel to the band through their live concerts. Max Creek's lasting impact and loyal fan base have cemented their status as a regional musical phenomenon.

As of 2026, Max Creek is still actively playing shows, celebrating their 40th anniversary in Costa Rica with Bill Kreutzmann of the Grateful Dead in a series of shows dubbed "Jungle Jam 2011" and their 50th anniversary at Rosedale Farm in Simsbury, Connecticut in the Summer of 2021.

Max Creek, Virginia is a small village nestled in the Appalachian Mountains within the Southwestern region of Virginia, near Pulaski, VA.

== Music ==
Max Creek's reputation as a quintessential representation of New England's musical identity stems from their blend of genres, including rock, country, funk, calypso, jazz, reggae, new wave, and blues. The band's sound is defined by the synchronicity of each member's playing. They are particularly known for performing transitions between musical sections and songs by creating improvisational jams. The band performs original music frequently, as well as renditions of other artists music in their own style.

Scott Murawski is acknowledged for his adept use of various guitar techniques, notably focusing on staccato notes and palm muting, which are fundamental aspects of his playing style. He draws inspiration from a variety of genres including rock, blues, funk, bluegrass, reggae, and jazz. Murawski incorporates a melodic sound evocative of Americana music and Southern Rock. He frequently utilizes distortion/overdrive with his electric guitar playing, lending a raw edge to his sound. A versatile musician, Murawski is proficient in multiple instruments and also performs acoustically with the band. His guitar tone is described as bright and lively, imparting an energetic atmosphere to his music. Simultaneously, he infuses a bluesy, drawn-out quality into his playing, imbuing his music with emotion and depth. Collectively, these elements contribute to a rich and dynamic guitar style that is uniquely his own.

Murawski's vocal style is characterized by a raspy, projected, and loud quality, occasionally incorporating percussive-like elements. He showcases a wide vocal range, particularly demonstrating his ability to transition between high and low notes, adding expressive complexity to his performances.

In his songwriting, Murawski's lyrics evoke human emotions, often in relatable or imaginative ways. His songs frequently explore themes of overcoming obstacles or appreciating life's moments. His music writing is marked by both simple and intricate melodies, influenced by the genres that shape his guitar style. During live performances, improvisation adds a spontaneous and dynamic element to Murawski's shows.

Mark Mercier's keyboard playing with Max Creek blends various styles, incorporating elements reminiscent of ragtime music infused with gospel tones, and integrating aspects of jazz, blues, calypso, Americana, and folk. Although predominantly a keyboardist, Mercier's proficiency on the organ, piano, and synthesizer contributes to a diverse mix of instrumental tones during performances.

Mercier's vocal style with Max Creek, akin to his keyboard playing, features tones reminiscent of soul, gospel, and folk music. His vocal range is primarily mid to low, and his delivery is projected and emotive.

In his songwriting, Mercier's lyrics contain themes of nostalgia, often with a storytelling quality that is original and unique. His lyrics blend elements commonly found in traditional music with creative twists, accompanied by music containing blues elements characterized by numerous crescendos and moments of softness.

John Rider's bass guitar playing with Max Creek is characterized by a sound found in the musical genres of bluegrass, southern rock, and country rock, with elements of jazz and funk woven into his playing. His bass lines provide a solid foundation for the band's music, imparting depth and groove to their sound.

Similar to Mark Mercier, John Rider's vocal style with Max Creek features tones of soul, gospel, country, doo wop, and folk music. His vocal range is primarily mid to low, and, like Mercier, his delivery is projected and emotive. At times, his vocals have a boot-stomping quality and, according to fans of Max Creek, a "pirate-like" quality.

In his songwriting for Max Creek, Rider's lyrics are evocative of the tribulations of love and imagery of the American Southeast, particularly imagery of railroads and the landscape. His lyrics, like Mercier's, are original and unique, yet they contain elements commonly found in traditional music. The music accompanying his lyrics contains elements of country rock and rhythm and blues.

The rhythm section, anchored by drummers Bill Carbone and Jamemurrell Stanley, provides a dynamic foundation for their performances, creating percussive fluidity with tones from rock, funk, jazz, and world music.

Max Creek's music style is characterized by intense improvised jams. These influenced later bands as Phish, whose bassist Mike Gordon has referred to Max Creek as one of his "favorite bands," and has sat in with the band several times over the past few years. Max Creek's live shows typically last three hours or more.

Scott Murawski collaborated with lyricist Robert Hunter to create the song "Pollyanna." Hunter, best known for his work with the Grateful Dead, provided the lyrics, while Murawski composed the music and performed the song with BK3 and Max Creek.

Max Creek often incorporates elements of nature into their lyrics and artwork, drawing upon imagery of the natural world as metaphors for the human experience, reflecting themes of growth, change, and the passage of time.

== Members ==
=== Current members ===
- Scott Murawski - guitar, vocals (1972; 1973–present)
- Mark Mercier - keyboards, vocals (1973–present)
- John Rider - bass, vocals (1971–present)
- Bill Carbone - drums, vocals (2011–present)
- Jamemurrell Stanley - percussion, vocals (2011–present)

=== Former Members ===
- Dave Reed - guitar, vocals (1971–1974)
- Bob Gosselin - drums (1971–1985)
- Amy Fazzano - vocals (1976–1983)
- Rob Fried - percussion, vocals (1979–2004)
- Greg DeGuglielmo - drums (1985–1991)
- Greg Vasso - drums (1991–1996; 2004–2011)
- Scott Allshouse - drums (1996–2011)

== Discography ==
- (1977) Max Creek
- (1980) Rainbow
- (1982) Drink the Stars
- (1986) Windows
- (1990) MCMXC
- (1998) Spring Water
- (2000) Live At The Connecticut Expo Center 12.31.99
- (2014) Live at the F-Shed, Syracuse, NY. Feb 15, 2014
- (2019) 45 & Live
- (2020) Live At The Stafford Palace Theater, Acoustic
- (2021) Live from a Secret Location (9/18/20)
- (2021) Buried Treasure V1 (6/23/93 Woody's Roadhouse, Washington, MA, Set 1, Acoustic)
- (2023) Finally Outside of Home (June 18, 2021)

=== Live Recordings ===
A number of the band's live performances are available for download from Archive.org.

== Additional Projects ==
Scott Murawski has received recognition with BK3 (aka Bill Kreutzmann Trio, KBM, Three) which also included drummer Bill Kreutzmann of the Grateful Dead and intermittent residencies on bass guitar from Mike Gordon, Bonnie Raitt bassist James "Hutch" Hutchinson, and former bassist of the Allman Brothers Band, Oteil Burbridge.

Scott Murawski tours with Phish bassist Mike Gordon and his band the Mike Gordon Band (MGB). Members within the Mike Gordon Band currently include Robert Walter, Craig Myers, and John Kimock (son of musician, Steve Kimock).

Depth Quartet is a band that Scott Murawski also plays in alongside former Max Creek drummer, Greg Vasso. In addition, Murawski and Mercier often play acoustic duo concerts.

Mark Mercier has two side projects. One is "The Marks Brothers" which includes himself on keyboards and vocals, Mark Paradis from The Mark Paradis Band on guitar and vocals, Dave Stoltz formerly of Dickey Betts and Great Southern on bass and Brian "Duke" Konopka formerly from S.L.A.P. and The Mark Paradis Band on drums. His other band that plays a few shows throughout the year is "The Mark Mercier Band." Mercier and Paradis often play acoustic duo gigs around the Connecticut area as well, at times joined by Rider on Bass.

Bill Carbone regularly appears in "The Z3," an organ trio dedicated to the music of Frank Zappa featuring organist Beau Sasser (Alan Evans Trio, Akashic Record) and guitarist Tim Palmieri (Breakfast, Lotus, Kung Fu).

=== Tribute Group ===
In 2018, a Max Creek tribute band was formed under the name "Something Is Forming." The band currently features John Spignesi of JSB, Jeff King of The Kings, Jordan Giangreco of The Breakfast, Chris Andrews of Desert Rain, and Ryan Lizotte of Sweet 'Stache. The group often performs when Max Creek is not playing. Both Murawski and Mercier have performed with the band.
