= Futurekids =

American educational technology company

Futurekids, Inc.
- Type: Private
- Industry: Educational software
- Founded: Westwood, California, 1983
- Founder: Peter Markovitz
- Headquarters: El Segundo, California, United States
- Area served: Worldwide
- Products: Kids Education
- Owner: Bob and Jan Davidson

Futurekids, Inc. was a privately held K–12 educational software company headquartered in El Segundo, California, which focused on technological literacy and computer literacy.

== History ==
The company was founded in 1983. It offered professional development programs and K–12 technology curriculum in schools in 65 countries. It focuses on the integration of technology and the use of computers in the educational process.

In 2008, the Software and Information Industry Association (SIIA) selected Futurekids' Real Journeys in Technology curriculum as a 2008 Codie awards finalist among educational software in the best instructional solution in other curriculum areas category.

Futurekids has been awarded contracts for their educational products by the state of Michigan and Pennsylvania.

In 2004, Platinum Television Group selected Futurekids for a segment on Today's Family, a series that celebrates successful parenting solutions,

In 2005, Futurekids worked with Intel Corporation and other technology and national youth organizations in creating the Partnership for 21st Century Skills, an advocacy organization for positioning computer skills at the center of U.S. K–12. In November 2007, the Partnership for 21st Century Skills launched Route 21, an online, one-stop shop for 21st-century skills-related information, resources and tools.

In 2007, Futurekids expanded its innovative professional development program to more schools the "Classrooms for the Future" technology initiative in the state of Pennsylvania. The Classrooms for the Future initiative, believed to be the largest program of technology integration ever undertaken by a state, allocates $200 million in funding over a three-year period for laptop computers, software, printers, interactive electronic whiteboards, professional development, technology infrastructure, support and high-speed Internet access. Futurekids was tapped to provide some professional development services for the initiative.

Futurekids Inc. ceased operations on June 30, 2009. Franchises worldwide continue to offer the Futurekids curriculum, including but not limited to Futurekids Hong Kong.
