= SerialPod =

US musical group

- Origin: United States
- Genres: Rock, Jam band
- Years active: 2005
- Past members: Trey Anastasio; Mike Gordon; Bill Kreutzmann

SerialPod is a rock trio featuring Phish members Trey Anastasio and Mike Gordon and Grateful Dead drummer Bill Kreutzmann. The group was formed after Kreutzmann and fellow Dead drummer Mickey Hart joined Anastasio onstage for several Dead classics during Anastasio's solo show at The Warfield in San Francisco on December 2, 2005.

SerialPod was formed as part of the Warren Haynes Christmas Jam in Asheville, North Carolina, which took place on December 17, 2005. The night before, the band performed a stealth gig in Asheville at The Orange Peel. Both shows featured appearances from additional musicians including Haynes and Ivan Neville. The band played Dead and Phish classics, plus covers from Nirvana, Jimi Hendrix, and others.
