= Vic Henley =

American comedian (1962–2020)

- Born: October 2, 1962; Oxford, Alabama, U.S.
- Died: April 6, 2020 (aged 57)
- Occupation: Comedian

Victor Darrell Henley (October 2, 1962 – April 6, 2020), was an American comedian. Henley appeared on HBO, CBS, NBC, Fox, BRAVO, CMT, XM radio MTV, A&E, and The History Channel. He was a VH1 VJ and had his own Comedy Central half-hour special as well as performances on The Late Show and The Tonight Show.

== Early life ==
Henley was born on October 2, 1962, in Oxford, Alabama, and was a graduate of Auburn University. He was set to become a stockbroker before he landed a spot in comedy.

== Career ==
Henley was co-author of the national best-selling book Games Rednecks Play with fellow comedian Jeff Foxworthy. Henley was a close friend of Kathleen Madigan and Ron White.

He was a regular contributor and guest on the "Opie and Anthony Show With Jim Norton” on XM radio.

He had appeared on HBO, CBS, NBC, FOX, BRAVO, CMT, MTV, A&E, The History Channel. He was a VH-1 VJ and has his own Comedy Central half-hour special, as well as performances on The Late Show and The Tonight Show.

== Death ==
Henley died after suffering a pulmonary embolism April 6, 2020, aged 57.
