= Shaun Murawski =

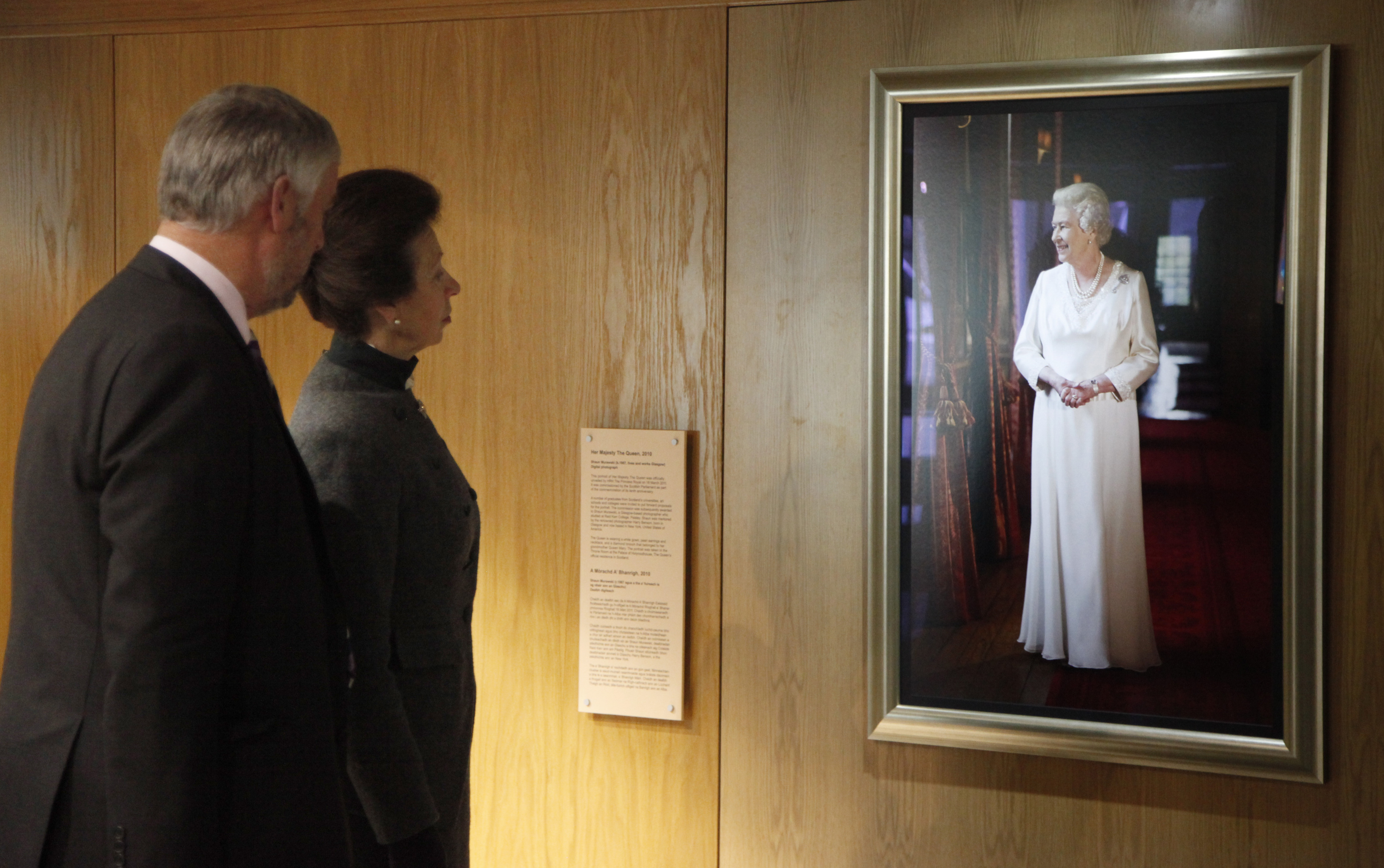
The Princess Royal unveiling a portrait of Her Majesty The Queen, by Murawski, at the Scottish Parliament on 16 March 2010

Shaun Murawski (born in Glasgow) is a Scottish photographer, who became the youngest photographer to ever be selected to take a formal portrait of Her Majesty The Queen. He was selected in May 2010 by the Scottish Parliament after submissions were made by art schools, universities and college across Scotland.

The portrait was unveiled by The Princess Royal, Princess Anne in May 2011, and currently hangs in the public area of Holyrood Parliament in Edinburgh.
