= Tom Cleary =

American gridiron football player (1922–2009)

Profile
- Position: Linebacker

Personal information
- Born: October 30, 1922
- Died: June 20, 2009 (aged 86); Harris County, Texas, U.S.
- Listed height: 6 ft 2 in (1.88 m)
- Listed weight: 230 lb (104 kg)

Career information
- College: Pennsylvania

Career history
- 1948: Hawaiian Warriors (PCFL)
- 1950: Edmonton Eskimos (CFL)

Thomas Leo Cleary (October 30, 1922 – June 20, 2009) was an American professional football player who played for the Edmonton Eskimos He was a former Washington Redskins tackle. He also played for the Hawaiian Warriors of the Pacific Coast Professional Football League and won an award for the most outstanding lineman.

Cleary was from Oakland, California and attended Roosevelt High School there and later Saint Mary's College in Moraga, California where he played college football.^{[n1]} He was a veteran of World War II with the United States Marine Corps, having served in the Marine Raiders battalion commanded by Evans Carlson and reaching the rank of captain. Cleary married Isabel Lloyd, who was from Alberta. He died in 2009.

== Notes ==
- ^[n1]Though Canadian newspapers state that Cleary played at the University of Pennsylvania in 1939, 1940, 1941, 1945 and 1946, there is no record of any Thomas Cleary having attended or played football for these purported years.
