= Go Ahead (band) =

American rock band (1986–1988)

- Origin: San Francisco, California
- Genre: Rock
- Years active: 1986–1988
- Past members: Bill Kreutzmann; Brent Mydland; Alex Ligertwood; Jerry Cortez; David Margen; Bob Weir

Go Ahead was a band formed by Grateful Dead members Bill Kreutzmann and Brent Mydland in 1986. They performed up until early 1988. The band also included Alex Ligertwood and David Margen who were members of Santana.

== History ==
In July 1986 Grateful Dead guitarist Jerry Garcia fell into a diabetic coma. He awoke five days later but took months to recover. During this time drummer Bill Kreutzmann, David Margen, and keyboardist Brent Mydland formed the band Go Ahead. The two had performed briefly in a band called Kokomo during the summer of 1985. Go Ahead played a number of gigs in December 1986; soon afterwards, the Grateful Dead resumed performing.

Grateful Dead guitarist Bob Weir joined the band in November 1987 and remained until the band's final performance in early 1988. In these performances Go Ahead typically played an opening set without Weir. Weir would then play an acoustic set by himself and join the band for a third set.

Following the dissolution of Go Ahead in March 1988 Kreutzmann, Mydland and Weir continued to perform with the Grateful Dead and Ligertwood rejoined Santana the next year. Mydland died of a speedball overdose on July 26, 1990. Margen went on to work with Joe Walsh, Greg Rolie, and Run DMC.

== Personnel ==
- Bill Kreutzmann - drums
- Brent Mydland - keyboards, vocals
- Alex Ligertwood - guitar, vocals
- Jerry Cortez - guitar, vocals
- David Margen - bass
- Bob Weir - guitar, vocals (November 1987 to March 1988)
