= Trichromes =

Studio album by the Trichromes
- Released: July 2, 2002
- Genre: Rock
- Length: 67:50
- Label: 33rd Street
- Producer: L. Henry Sarmiento II

Bill Kreutzmann chronology
Backbone (1998)	Trichromes (2002)	7 Walkers (2010)

Trichromes is an album by the Trichromes, a rock band led by former Grateful Dead drummer Bill Kreutzmann. The group's only full-length album was released in 2002. Robert Hunter wrote the lyrics for eight of the eleven songs.

== Critical reception ==
Professional ratings
Review scores
Source	Rating
AllMusic	3/5 stars
The Music Box	2.5/5 stars

John Metzger of The Music Box wrote, "Much like the group's first single 'Dice with the Universe', much of its new self-titled release straddles a line between breezy pop, folksy blues, and classic rock.... the band occasionally strikes gold while delivering a pleasing set of material, anchored by one of the finest drummers in the history of rock 'n' roll."

William Ruhlmann wrote on Allmusic, "Trichromes guitarist Ralph Woodson and such guests as Pete Sears and Neal Schon do fine by [Hunter's lyrics], creating songs that sound like they could have fit into the Dead's repertoire. And the band's jamming style is also reminiscent of the Dead...."

== Track listing ==
1. "None So Blind" (Robert Hunter, Ralph Woodson, Pete Sears) – 4:48
2. "Iowa Soldier" (Hunter, Woodson) – 6:31
3. "Track 6" (Hunter, Woodson, Sears) – 6:21
4. "Simply Nowhere" (Hunter, Woodson, Mike DiPirro) – 8:08
5. "Dice with the Universe" (Hunter, Neal Schon, Ira Walker) – 4:59
6. "Say You're Not Leaving" (Woodson) – 4:58
7. "For You" (Hunter, Woodson) – 4:52
8. "Kickin' Ass on the Avenue" (Hunter, Woodson, Sears) – 5:30
9. "Stop, Drop and Roll" (Hunter, Woodson) – 4:48
10. "Impossible Triangle" (Woodson) – 5:28
11. "Knot of Eternity" (Bill Kreutzmann, Woodson, Sears) – 10:38

== Personnel ==
- Bill Kreutzmann – drums
- Ralph Woodson – guitar
- Mike DiPirro – bass
- Sy Klopps – vocals

=== Production ===
- L. Henry Sarmiento II – producer, mixing, engineering
- Steve Parish – executive producer
- Herbie Herbert – executive producer
- Jeffrey Norman – additional production
- Gordon Brislawn – Pro Tools guru
- Michael Romanowski – mastering
- Will Cascio – artwork, art direction, design
