= BK3 =

American rock band (2008–2012)

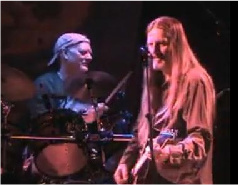
- Bill Kreutzmann (left) and Scott Murawski (right) performing with BK3 in New Haven, CT, 2009

Background information
- Also known as: Bill Kreutzmann Trio, Three, KBM
- Origin: Hawaii, USA
- Genres: Rock
- Years active: 2008–2012
- Past members: Bill Kreutzmann; Scott Murawski; Oteil Burbridge; James Hutchinson; Tara Nevins
- Website: billkreutzmann.net/

BK3 were an American rock band led by Grateful Dead drummer Bill Kreutzmann. Kreutzmann formed the band in 2008 with Max Creek guitarist Scott Murawski and Allman Brothers Band bassist Oteil Burbridge.

== Formation ==
Bill Kreutzmann and Scott Murawski were introduced to each other in early 2008 by Mike Gordon and the three performed together as a trio at a benefit in Costa Rica. Kreutzmann and Murawski then decided to form a full-time band and they offered Gordon the bassist position but he had to decline due to his other projects. Kreutzmann then offered the position up to Allman Brothers Band bassist Oteil Burbridge and he accepted.

== Touring ==
They dubbed themselves the Bill Kreutzmann Trio and successfully toured the northeast during the summer of 2008 including a stop at the Gathering of the Vibes. The group played many Grateful Dead songs, Max Creek songs and covers as well as new songs written by Robert Hunter.

The group performed several shows early in the year before Kreutzmann became involved in The Dead tour. They toured North America again during the summer of 2009 although due to touring commitments with the Allman Brothers Band and a desire to spend more time at home, Oteil Burbridge was replaced by James "Hutch" Hutchinson from Bonnie Raitt's band. Bill Kreutzmann speculated that they would release a live album although, to date, this has not occurred. Nonetheless, most of the band's recordings were recorded and made available by tapers.

They performed a few shows in California early in 2010 with Oteil Burbridge back in the band, and played as BK3 at "Jungle Jam" in Jacó, Costa Rica in 2011 and 2012.

== Members ==
BK3 line-ups
(2008–2009)	Bill Kreutzmann – drums; Scott Murawski – guitar, vocals; Oteil Burbridge – bass, vocals
(2009–2010)	Bill Kreutzmann – drums; Scott Murawski – guitar, vocals; James Hutchinson – bass, vocals; Tara Nevins – fiddle, washboard, acoustic guitar, percussion, vocals
(2010-2012)	Bill Kreutzmann – drums; Scott Murawski – guitar, vocals; Oteil Burbridge – bass, vocals
