= Paul Green (musician) =

American music teacher and founder of Paul Green School of Rock

- Born: Paul Green
- Origin: Philadelphia, Pennsylvania, US
- Genres: Hard rock, alternative rock, progressive rock, folk rock, pop rock, R&B, soul
- Occupation: Music educator
- Instruments: Guitar, bass
- Years active: 1998–present
- Website: www.paulgreenrock.com

Paul Richard Green is a music teacher and entrepreneur who founded School of Rock (formerly known as the Paul Green School of Rock Music), a performance-based music program for children, teens, and adults. First established in Philadelphia in 1998, schools have opened in numerous U.S. states, as well as in Mexico. In 2005, the company was the subject of a documentary film titled Rock School.

Paul Green left the School of Rock in early 2010. In 2011, Green joined the Woodstock Film Festival as its music coordinator. He also hosted a weekly rock radio show on Radio Woodstock 100.1 WDST called The Tool Shed with Paul Green.

In 2025, Green was accused by former students of alleged emotional, physical, and sexual abuse.

== Early life ==
Green grew up in the Port Richmond neighborhood of Philadelphia. He was inspired to pick up a guitar at age four after looking at albums his guitarist mother owned. His father died when he was five years old. Green later attended the University of Pennsylvania, where he received a degree in philosophy.

== Career ==
=== The School of Rock Music ===
Paul Green began giving traditional individual music lessons in his home in 1996. He invited a group of his students to sit in, or "jam", with his own band with disappointing results. But by the third week, he found that the students who played in a group had advanced much more than the students who received only traditional solo instruction. He modified his teaching method to supplement traditional instruction with group practice, with the goal of playing a show. He compared it to the difference between "...shooting hoops and playing basketball". In 1999, the most advanced students played their first public concert at an art gallery.

He took out a loan for $7000 in 2002 and established a permanent location for the first Paul Green School of Rock Music in a dilapidated building at 1320 Race St, Philadelphia that has since been demolished. The location had a number of small rooms for individual instrumental instruction as well as larger performance spaces for full band practices. Green chose to name the school after himself to avoid confusion with the Herbie Hancock television program Rockschool, but always referred the program as "Rock School".

Green was bought out in 2009 by investor Sterling Partners and the management team he had brought in, headed by former Clear Channel executive Matt Ross. Ross remained chief executive officer until 2010, managing the company's expansion and private equity acquisition. The name was changed to School of Rock in 2010, and former McDonald's executive Chris Catalano replaced Ross as CEO.

=== Paul Green Rock Academy ===
Green's non-compete agreement with School of Rock expired in 2013, and he announced plans to open a Paul Green Rock Academy in Woodstock, New York to serve ages 8 to 18, as well as a Woodstock Music Lab in Ulster County with Woodstock Music Festival promoter Michael Lang. In February 2018, Green opened a Paul Green Rock Academy in Norwalk, Connecticut. The Paul Green Rock Academies were closed in August 2025, following accusations of sexual misconduct from Green towards his students.

=== Films and documentaries ===
A crew from the Viacom television channel VH1 filmed at the Philadelphia location for a proposed reality TV series in 2000. After the shoot, Green claimed the producers had stopped returning his phone calls, with a spokesperson for Viacom saying, "We are developing programmes all the time. Not everything [we film] gets used".

In January 2003, filmmakers Don Argott and Sheena M. Joyce attended a concert by the students, and decided to make a documentary about the school five minutes after the concert started. They met with Green the next day and began shooting video one day later, intending to follow an entire school year. Midway through the nine months of shooting what became Rock School, they learned that the Viacom movie studio Paramount would be releasing a fictional film to be called School of Rock featuring Jack Black as Dewey Finn, a would-be rock star teaching children to play rock music. Many critics claimed that Black's characterization was based on Green's persona though screenwriter Mike White claimed that he had "...never heard of Paul Green before". Green considered a lawsuit, but decided against it, reasoning that the School benefited from the film saying "I considered suing, but what are you going to do? It's better, in a karmic sense, to just reap the rewards."

Rock School is a documentary about Paul Green and the School of Rock Music. The documentary exhibits the school through the eyes of its founder, Paul Green. The film displays him showing off his wide variety of teaching tactics and also how the school affects the lives of the students that attend. Paul Green is seen several times jumping up and down, screaming at kids, and kicking students, all to teach them. As Ken Tucker, the National Public Radio rock critic, phrased it in his review, "I'd hand out DVDs of Rock School to everyone in the country with a teaching degree and dare them to match this level of commitment."

=== The School of Rock Festival ===
The Paul Green School of Rock Music Festival was first held in Asbury Park, New Jersey in June 2007. Featured acts included Ween, Bad Brains, the Adrian Belew Trio, and the Bouncing Souls, along with students from the School of Rock Music.

The 2008 festival was held over the course of three days, from June 27 to 29, in Philadelphia. It took place at Festival Pier at Penn's Landing, where performers included the Dropkick Murphys, Goldfinger, Less Than Jake, Westbound Train, and Suburban Legends.

=== Paul Green's All-Stars ===
After a few years of running his school Paul decided to create the "All-Stars Program". All-Stars are a group of the students from the entirety of the program, all across the country, handpicked from schools in the program through auditions. They go on tour to play such venues as BB Kings in Times Square, The Knitting Factory in LA and NYC, The Roxy and Crash Mansion in LA, Stubbs in Austin, Hard Rock Cafes, House of Blues, and many of the festivals in the country such as Lollapalooza, Austin City Limits, along with many others.

== Sexual misconduct allegations ==
In May 2025, Air Mail reported on allegations from former students that Green fostered an environment of emotional and physical abuse, including sexual abuse, at his Philadelphia-based school during the 1990s. The allegations surfaced as the Paul Green Rock Academy was organizing a summer tour for student musicians, leading to venue cancellations. Subsequently, Green stepped down as tour director, although he remained involved with the school until August 2025, when the Paul Green Rock Academy shut down.

In August 2025, The Philadelphia Inquirer reported on two dozen further accusations from former students and staff, including a woman who said Green had "initiated frequent sexual contact that lasted nearly two years" when she was 17. Four former students and staff members corroborated her claim, with two saying Green himself had told them about his sexual contact with the woman. Green denied ever having a relationship with "anyone under legal age or anyone who was a current student".
