= Moss (Mike Gordon album) =

Studio album by Mike Gordon
- Released: October 19, 2010
- Recorded: 2002–2010
- Genre: Rock
- Length: 45:01
- Label: Rounder
- Producer: Mike Gordon, Jared Slomoff

Mike Gordon chronology
The Green Sparrow (2008)	Moss (2010)	Moss Remixes (2011)

Moss is Phish bassist Mike Gordon's third solo album, released October 19, 2010. It reached number 9 on the Billboard Top Heatseekers chart.

== Reception ==
Professional ratings
Review scores
Source	Rating
AllMusic	3/5 stars

Writing for AllMusic, music critic James Allen wrote that while the album shared characteristics of music by Phish, he also commented: "Taken entirely on his own merits, Gordon comes across as an inventive but easygoing artist... Despite Gordon's multi-instrumental abilities, many of the songs are built—from the bottom up—around his funky, percolating basslines, but that's not to imply that any of the tunes are lacking in interesting harmonic development... "

== Track listing ==
All songs written by Mike Gordon except "Can't Stand Still", lyrics Mike Gordon, music Mike Gordon, Page McConnell, Jon Fishman, Jared Slomoff

1. "Can't Stand Still"
2. "Horizon Line"
3. "Fire from a Stick"
4. "What Things Seem"
5. "Babylon Baby"
6. "Flashback"
7. "The Void"
8. "Got Away"
9. "Spiral"
10. "Idea"
