= Bill Kreutzmann =

American drummer (born 1946)

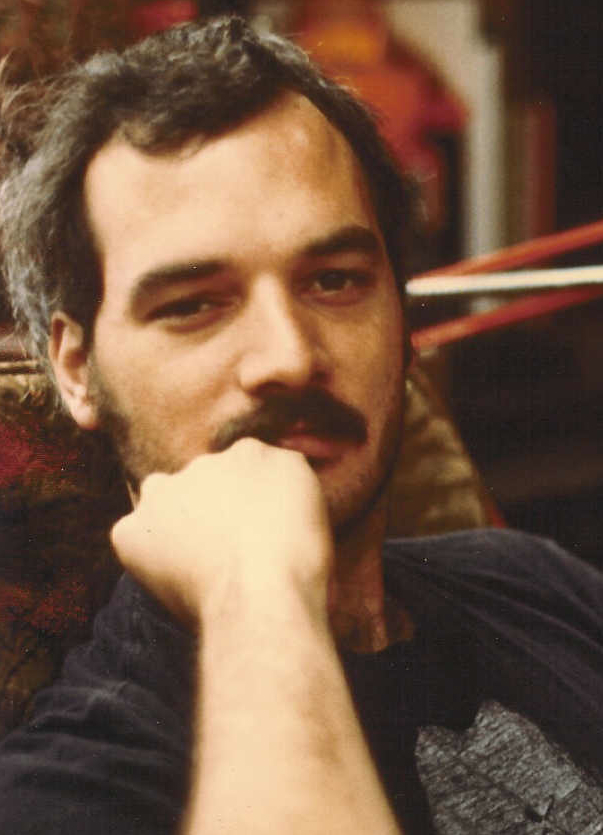
- Bill Kreutzmann, c. 1975

Background information
- Born: William Kreutzmann Jr. May 7, 1946 (age 80); Palo Alto, California, U.S.
- Genres: Rock; psychedelia; jam; jazz
- Occupation: Drummer
- Years active: 1959–present
- Member of: Billy & the Kids
- Formerly of: Grateful Dead; The Other Ones; The Dead; Rhythm Devils; Go Ahead; Backbone; The Trichromes; SerialPod; BK3; 7 Walkers; Dead & Company
- Website: billkreutzmann.com

William Kreutzmann Jr. (/ˈkrɔɪtsmɑːn/ KROYTS-mahn; born May 7, 1946) is an American drummer and founding member of the rock band Grateful Dead. He played with the band for its entire thirty-year career, usually alongside fellow drummer Mickey Hart, and has continued to perform with former members of the Grateful Dead in various lineups, and with his own bands BK3, 7 Walkers and Billy & the Kids.

== Early life ==
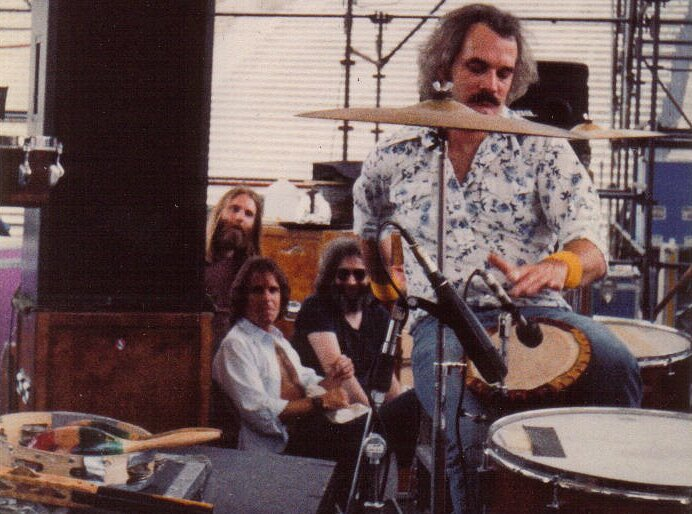
Bill Kreutzmann, playing a talking drum. Grateful Dead band members Brent Mydland, Bob Weir and Jerry Garcia (from left to right) are in the background. Denver, Colorado.

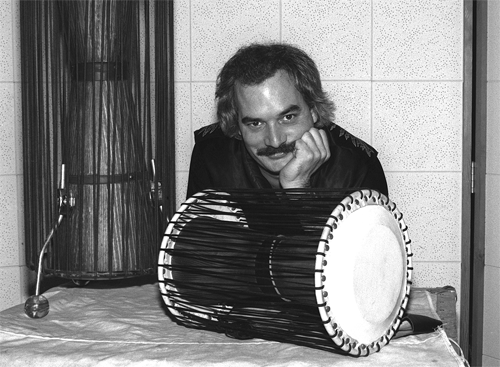
Kreutzmann with a talking drum, 1982 Photo: David Gans

Kreutzmann was born in Palo Alto, California, the son of Janice Beryl (née Shaughnessy) and William Kreutzmann Sr. His father was of German descent. His maternal grandfather was football coach and innovator Clark Shaughnessy.

Kreutzmann started playing drums at the age of 13. At first he practiced on a Slingerland drum kit lent to him. As a teenager, he was practicing drums alone in a large building at his high school when Aldous Huxley and another man walked in. Huxley told Kreutzmann he had never heard anything like it, and encouraged him in his drumming – despite the fact Kreutzmann had been told by his sixth grade music teacher that he could not keep a beat. Kreutzmann continued to practice a great deal. His earliest enthusiasm was for the music of Ray Charles and other R&B musicians. He has explained that later he learned some advanced technique or tricks from Mickey Hart.

Kreutzmann listened to jazz groups in clubs when he found an opportunity for an under-age guy to get in. After joining the Warlocks (later called the Grateful Dead), bassist Phil Lesh introduced him to the work of one of the top jazz drummers of the time, Elvin Jones. Kreutzmann became an enthusiast, also, for the funk music of The Meters.

== Grateful Dead ==
At the end of 1964 Kreutzmann co-founded the band the Warlocks, along with Dana Morgan, Jr. (who was soon replaced by Phil Lesh), Jerry Garcia, Bob Weir, and Ron "Pigpen" McKernan. Their first gig was May 5, 1965, two days before Kreutzmann's nineteenth birthday. During the band's early days, Kreutzmann sometimes used a fake draft card with the name "Bill Sommers" to be admitted to bars where the band was playing, since he was underage. In November 1965, the Warlocks became the Grateful Dead.

Meeting fellow percussionist Mickey Hart in the fall of 1967 had a large impact on Kreutzmann's career. Hart soon joined the Dead, making it one of the first (and few) rock bands to feature two drummers. The combination of their playing was an important part of the band's sound and earned them the nickname "the Rhythm Devils" (the name being quipped to them by Francis Ford Coppola). Their lengthy drum duets were a feature of nearly every show from 1978 to 1995, and are documented in a number of recordings by the band.

During the 1980s Kreutzmann formed and performed with three side bands: The Billy Kreutzmann All-stars, Kokomo, and Go Ahead, mostly playing San Francisco Bay Area clubs, although Go Ahead toured somewhat in 1986–87. The All-Stars were Kreutzmann, David Nelson, guitar, Larry Murphy, Sr. on fiddle and Larry Murphy, Jr. on bass. Kokomo and Go Ahead featured Dead keyboardist Brent Mydland. David Margen played bass for Kokomo as well as Go Ahead. Kevin Russell was guitarist for Kokomo. Another brief early-80s configuration was billed as the "Kreutzmann-Margen Band".

Kreutzmann remained with the Grateful Dead until its dissolution after the death of Jerry Garcia in 1995, making him one of four members to play at every one of the band's 2,300 shows, along with Garcia, Weir and Lesh.

In 1994, Kreutzmann and the other members of the Grateful Dead were inducted into the Rock and Roll Hall of Fame.

In 2007, they won a Grammy Lifetime Achievement Award.

== Post-Grateful Dead ==
Kreutzmann's first post-Grateful Dead musical project was Backbone, a trio with guitarist Rick Barnett and bassist Edd Cook. They released one album, Backbone, in 1998.

In June 1997 Kreutzmann pleaded no contest in Kauai, Hawaii to charges of beating his former girlfriend at the home they shared. He served two days in jail.

In 1998, former Grateful Dead members Bob Weir, Phil Lesh, and Mickey Hart formed a band called the Other Ones, which played a number of shows as part of the Furthur Festival. The band did not play live in 1999. In 2000, Kreutzmann joined The Other Ones.

The band, with Kreutzmann, toured in 2000 and 2002.

In 2003, they changed their name to The Dead. The Dead played a number of live concerts in 2003, 2004 and 2009. Kreutzmann collaborated with Journey guitarist Neal Schon, Sy Klopps, Ira Walker, and Ralph Woodson to form the Trichromes in 2002. They released an EP, Dice with the Universe, and an album, Trichromes.

On December 17, 2005, he participated in the 17th Annual Warren Haynes Christmas Jam as the drummer for SerialPod, a group which also included Phish members Trey Anastasio and Mike Gordon.

During 2006, Kreutzmann teamed up with fellow Grateful Dead drummer Mickey Hart, Phish bassist Mike Gordon, and former The Other Ones guitarist Steve Kimock to form the Rhythm Devils. The band features songs from their respective former bands as well as new songs written by Jerry Garcia's songwriting companion Robert Hunter. The Rhythm Devils played their first tour in 2006, which ended at the popular Vegoose festival in Las Vegas, Nevada over the Halloween weekend. In 2008 they released a DVD called The Rhythm Devils Concert Experience.

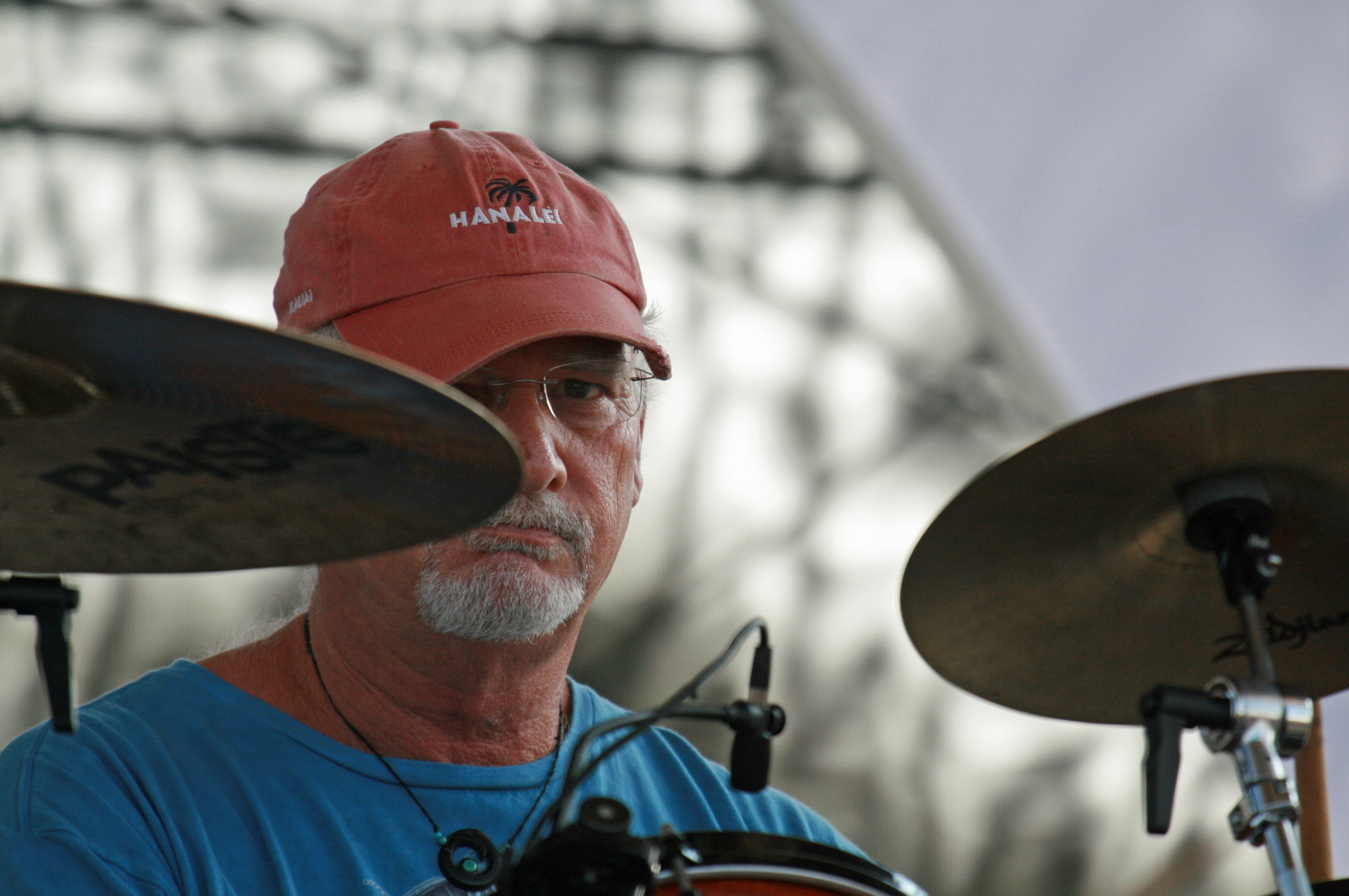
Kreutzmann in 2008

In 2008, Kreutzmann toured the eastern United States with bassist Oteil Burbridge of the Allman Brothers Band and guitarist Scott Murawski of Max Creek as BK3.

In 2009, Burbridge was replaced by former Neville Brothers and longtime Bonnie Raitt bassist James "Hutch" Hutchinson. Hutchinson had performed with Kreutzmann, Papa Mali and keyboardist Matt Hubbard earlier in the year at a New Year's Eve concert in Haiku on the island of Maui. Some 2009 shows also featured Donna the Buffalo singer/instrumentalist Tara Nevins. In February 2010 the trio played several concerts with Burbridge again assuming the bassist role. On August 2, 2009, Kreutzmann played with Phish during most of the second set at Red Rocks Amphitheatre. Along with other members of The Dead, he also visited the White House and met with President Obama.

In 2010, Kreutzmann formed a new band, called 7 Walkers, with guitarist Papa Mali, multi-instrumentalist Matt Hubbard, and bassist Reed Mathis. They toured the southern U.S. in the spring of 2010, with George Porter Jr. playing bass while Mathis toured with Tea Leaf Green. 7 Walkers has recorded a studio album which was released on November 2, 2010.

In October 2014, Kreutzmann announced he had formed a new band, called Billy & the Kids, which would begin performing live in December. The other band members are Reed Mathis on bass, Aron Magner of the Disco Biscuits on keyboards, and Tom Hamilton Jr. of American Babies on guitar and vocals.

Kreutzmann's memoir, Deal: My Three Decades of Drumming, Dreams, and Drugs with the Grateful Dead, was published by St. Martin's Press on May 5, 2015.

In 2015, Kreutzmann formed Dead & Company with former Grateful Dead members Weir and Hart, with other members including Jeff Chimenti, Otiel Burbridge, and John Mayer. They toured from 2015 to 2019, in the fall of 2021, as well as in the summer of 2022. In September 2022, Dead & Company announced the Final Tour, which would take place in Summer 2023, and would be their last. On April 22, 2023, Dead & Company released a statement stating Kreutzmann would not be performing these final tour dates, due to a "shift in creative direction".

After the death of Bob Weir, Kreutzmann is the only surviving member of the Grateful Dead's original lineup.

== Visual arts ==
In 1995, Kreutzmann produced a film called Ocean Spirit. The film is a documentary about the six-week expedition that involved a 3,000-mile ocean voyage from San Francisco to the Revillagigedo Islands, 400 miles southwest of Cabo San Lucas, Mexico. Kreutzmann is featured in the film and was the executive producer. Wesley C. Skiles, noted underwater filmmaker, wrote and directed the project. "We went with no preconceived notions," says Kreutzmann, "except that we were committed to the concept of nonintrusive interaction. We were seeking a way to go beyond our own boundaries as human beings, to meet with the creatures of the sea on their terms. And I hoped somehow to combine film and music to capture that moment of contact." The film has a strong environmental message and "exquisite photography", wrote John Metzger of the Music Box.

Kreutzmann also does work as a visual artist that began in 1993 when he acquired his first computer, a Powerbook 540C with Photoshop installed. Jerry Garcia, already a proficient computer artist, taught Kreutzmann the basics. In 2001, he began releasing limited edition reproductions of his digital artwork. His work can be found at Walnut Street Gallery.

== Political activism ==
On October 29, 2010, Kreutzmann endorsed Proposition 19, which would have legalized marijuana in California. Kreutzmann made the endorsement on the California Marijuana Report radio show. "I smoke marijuana and I'm not a criminal; please vote Yes on 19", Kreutzmann told Eric Brenner, the show's host. "Jerry Garcia would have voted Yes," he added.

== Discography ==
As band leader

- Backbone – Backbone (1999)
- Dice with the Universe (EP) – The Trichromes (2002)
- Trichromes – The Trichromes (2002)
- 7 Walkers – 7 Walkers (2010)

Grateful Dead

Rhythm Devils

- The Apocalypse Now Sessions: The Rhythm Devils Play River Music (1980)
- The Rhythm Devils Concert Experience (DVD) (2008)

With other artists

- Blows Against The Empire – Paul Kantner and Jefferson Starship (1970)
- If I Could Only Remember My Name – David Crosby (1971)
- James and the Good Brothers – James and the Good Brothers, 1971
- Powerglide – New Riders of the Purple Sage (1971)
- Garcia – Jerry Garcia (1972)
- Graham Nash and David Crosby – Graham Nash and David Crosby (1972)
- Ace – Bob Weir (1972)
- Demon in Disguise – David Bromberg (1972)
- The Rowan Brothers – The Rowan Brothers (1972)
- Fire Up – Merl Saunders (1973)
- Wanted Dead or Alive – David Bromberg (1974)
- Reflections – Jerry Garcia (1976)
- Texican Badman – Peter Rowan (1980)
- Livin' the Life – The Rowan Brothers (1980)
- A Wing and a Prayer – Matt Kelly (1987)
- Retrospective Dreams – RJ Fox (1991)
- Fire Up Plus – Merl Saunders (1992)
- Fiesta Amazonica – Merl Saunders and the Rainforest Band (1998)
- Live at the Fillmore – Denver (DVD) – The String Cheese Incident (2003)
- Now and Then – The Rowan Brothers (2004)
- Out Beyond Ideas – David Wilcox and Nance Pettit (2005)
- The Green Sparrow – Mike Gordon (2008)
- Fare Thee Well: Celebrating 50 Years of the Grateful Dead (2015)
- Garcia Live Volume Nine – Jerry Garcia and Merl Saunders (2017)
- Garcia Live Volume 22 – Jerry Garcia and Merl Saunders (2026)
