= Scott Murawski =

American musician (born 1956)

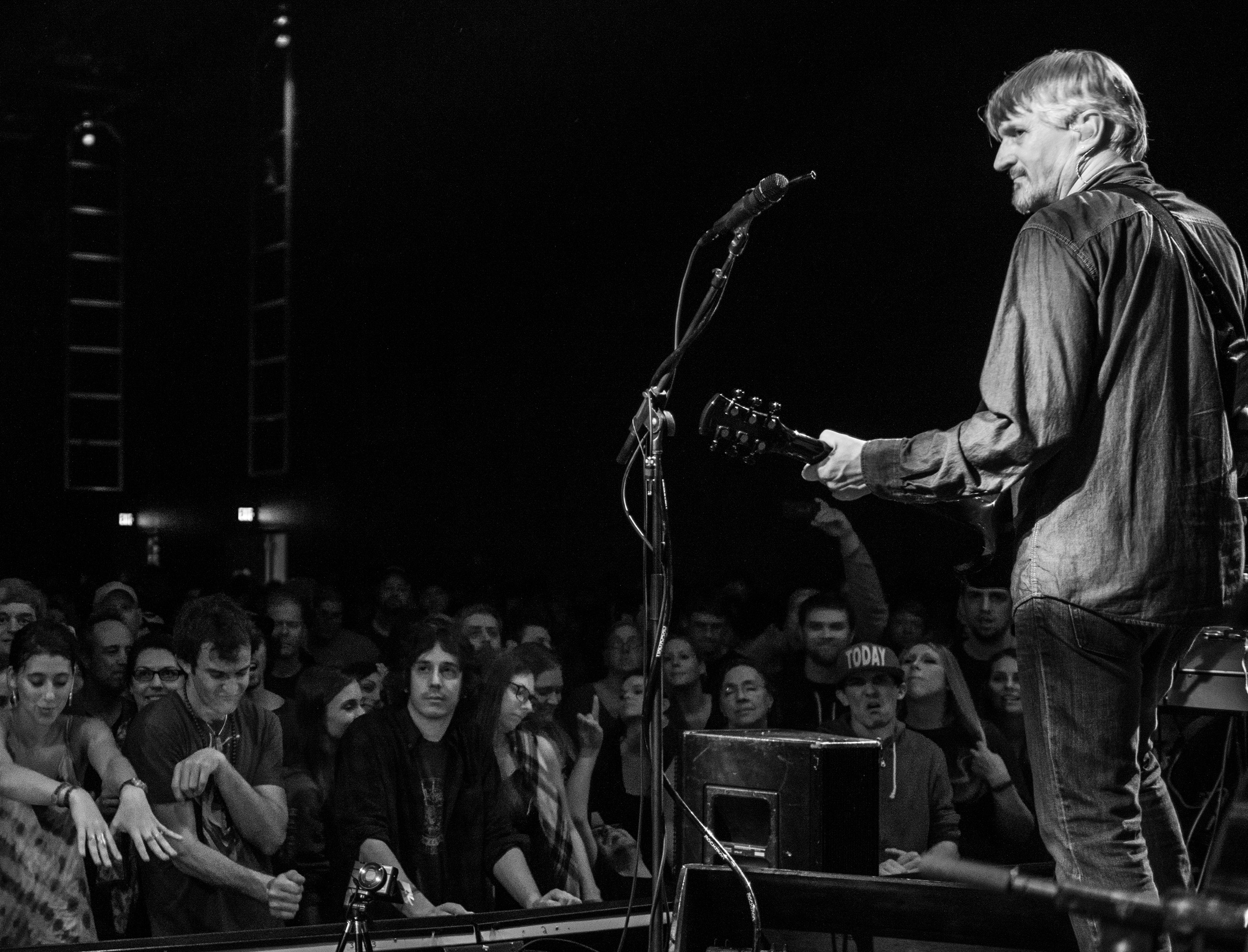
- Murawski performing at MassMoCA, April 2014

Background information
- Born: October 21, 1956 (age 69)
- Origin: Agawam, Massachusetts, U.S.
- Genres: Rock
- Instruments: Guitar, bass guitar, drums
- Website: http://www.scottmurawski.com

Scott Peter Murawski (born October 21, 1956, in Agawam, Massachusetts, United States) is an American multi-instrumentalist, specializing on the electric guitar. He has achieved fame primarily on guitar with the American rock band Max Creek. He is also a proficient pianist, bassist and drummer.

== Biography ==
Max Creek was formed in 1971. In 1972, founding member Dave Reed invited one of his music students, 15-year-old Scott Murawski, to sit in with the band. Scott's early original association with the band ended abruptly when he was banned from a club that the band played at regularly for drinking a beer. Months later, Mark Mercier was added to the lineup on keyboards and Scott was invited back to play guitar. Eventually, Dave left the band to pursue country rock and acoustic ragtime music, cementing Murawski as the band's permanent lead guitarist.

Murawski is a long-time collaborator and member of Phish bassist Mike Gordon's solo band, and BK3, a trio led by Grateful Dead drummer Bill Kreutzmann.

On February 25, 2014, Mike Gordon's album Overstep was released on ATO Records (all 11 tracks on the album were co-written by Murawski).

== Discography ==
- The Egg (April 30, 2013, recorded live in 2011)
- Overstep (February 25, 2014)

== Official live releases ==
- August 29, 2008 – Fox Theatre, Boulder, CO (Released at LivePhish.com)
- October 3, 2009 – Town Ballroom, Buffalo, NY (Released at LivePhish.com)
- November 26, 2010 – Port City Music Hall, Portland, ME (Released March 4, 2011, at LivePhish.com)
- November 16, 2010 – The Fine Line Music Cafe, Minneapolis, MN (Released March 4, 2011, at LivePhish.com)
- The Egg" – Recorded Live December 11, 2011 at The Egg, Albany, NY (Released April 30, 2013, at LivePhish.com)
- Vancouver" – Recorded Live March 22, 2014 at The Rio Theatre, Vancouver, BC, Canada (Released December 4, 2014, at LivePhish.com)
