= Inside In =

Studio album by Mike Gordon
- Released: August 26, 2003 (US)
- Recorded: 1999 & 2002
- Genre: Music
- Length: 46:28
- Label: JEMP
- Producer: Mike Gordon

Mike Gordon chronology
Clone - w/ Leo Kottke (2002)	Inside In (2003)	Sixty Six Steps - w/ Leo Kottke (2005)

Inside In is Mike Gordon's first solo album and was released August 26, 2003. This album was wholly produced during and after the movie, Outside Out and uses aural tracks from it. Included in the liner notes are lyrics to some tracks, art and design by Andrew Cunningham, photography by David Barron, confessions of a room, acronyms, a "good quote" from Col. Bruce Hampton, and "everything else unsaid".

Gordon formed a solo band to tour in support of the album in late 2003.

== Reception ==
Professional ratings
Review scores
Source	Rating
AllMusic	4/5 stars

Writing for AllMusic, music critic Robert L. Doerschuk praised the album and wrote "One would expect a down-home virtuoso performance from any alumnus of Phish, and that's what you get with Inside In... There's no better way to describe this weird and accessible mix: Inside In is far out."

== Track listing ==
All songs by Mike Gordon unless otherwise noted.

1. "Take Me Out" – 3:03
2. "Bone Delay" – 4:20
3. "Admoop" – 1:56
4. "Outside Out" – 3:23
5. "The Beltless Buckler" – 3:22
6. "Soulfood Man" – 3:28
7. "The Teacher" – 3:31
8. "Gatekeeper" – 3:22
9. "Couch Lady" – 4:01
10. "Major Minor" – 3:43
11. "The Lesson" – 3:00
12. "Exit Wound" (Mike Gordon, Amy Echo, Scott Ellism, Jeff Schartoff, Mike Tempesta) – 3:22
13. "Steel Bones" (Gordon, Bernie Green) – 5:55
14. "Take Me Out II" – 2:24
15. "Take Me Outro" – 2:09

== Album Outtakes (available on vinyl release only) ==
1. "Minkinetics"
2. "Trinners March"
3. "Be Your Tape"

== Personnel ==
- Mike Gordon – banjo, bass, guitar, percussion, pedal steel, accordion, keyboards, sound effects, vocals, tubular bells, bass harmonica
- Elizabeth Combs Beglin – vocals, spoken word
- Buddy Cage – pedal steel guitar
- Vassar Clements – fiddle
- Jeff Coffin – clarinet
- Jon Fishman – drums
- Béla Fleck – banjo
- Future Man – percussion
- Col. Bruce Hampton – guitar, vocals
- James Harvey – piano, trombone, keyboards, clavinet
- Ida James – spoken word
- Gabe Jarrett – drums
- Craig Johnson – trumpet
- Jeff Lawson – drums
- Russ Lawton – drums
- Stuart Paton – percussion
- Jared Slomoff – trumpet, background vocals
- Gordon Stone – pedal steel guitar
- Jimi Stout – spoken word
- Heloise Williams – vocals
