= Ramble Dove =

Ramble Dove is a Burlington, Vermont-based supergroup comprising key members of that scene, instigated by Brett R. Hughes, which includes Phish bassist Mike Gordon. The band, which was born out of Hughes' weekly Radio Bean honky tonk jam sessions, performs honky-tonk and vintage country music. A great number of Vermont luminaries join Hughes on stage for these weekly jam sessions, including Mike Gordon, Page McConnell, Gordon Stone, Scott Murawski, Marie Claire, Mark Ransom, Mark Spencer, Russ Lawton, Benny Yurco, Tyler Bolles, Sean Preece, Brett Lanier, Leon Campos, Bryan Dondero, Ian Wade, Kelly Ravin, Paddy Reagan, Noah and Justin Crowther, Joe Clearly and Neil Cleary. In the summer of 2006, the group performed at Tennessee's Bonnaroo festival.
