= Mike Gordon =

American bass guitarist and vocalist

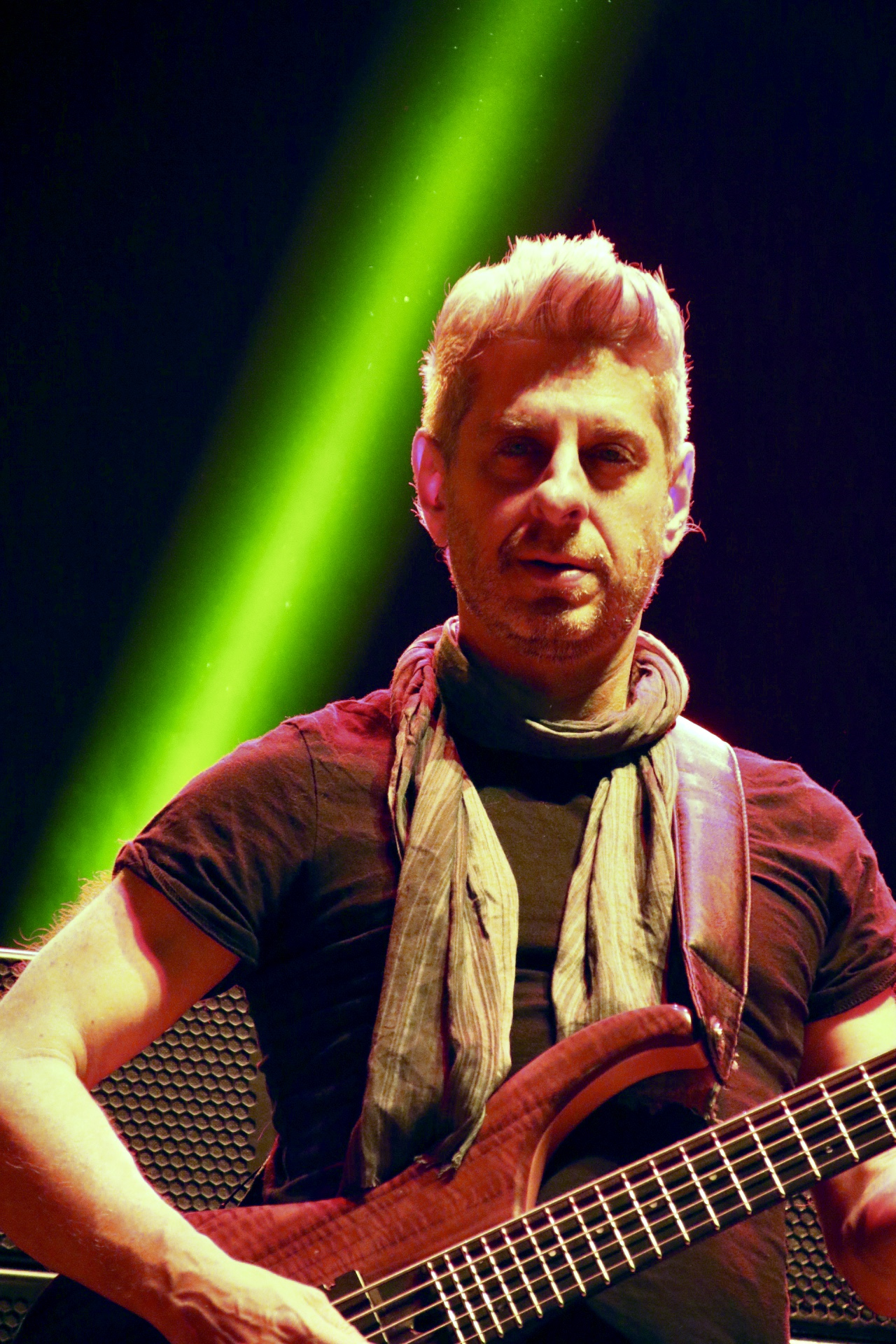
- Mike Gordon in 2019

Background information
- Born: Michael Eliot Gordon; June 3, 1965 (age 61); Sudbury, Massachusetts, U.S.
- Genres: Rock; jam; funk; psychedelic; folk; bluegrass; progressive rock
- Occupations: Musician; filmmaker; author; photographer
- Instruments: Bass guitar; vocals; banjo
- Years active: 1982–present
- Labels: Megaplum; ATO Records
- Member of: Phish
- Formerly of: Rhythm Devils; Benevento-Russo Duo; Ramble Dove; SerialPod
- Website: Official website

Michael Eliot Gordon (born June 3, 1965) is an American bass guitarist and vocalist most recognized as a founding member of the band Phish. In addition to bass, Gordon plays banjo, piano, and guitar. He is a filmmaker (Rising Low, Outside Out) and author (Mike's Corner). He has released six solo studio albums and three studio albums with acoustic guitar pioneer Leo Kottke.

== Biography ==
Gordon was born in Sudbury, Massachusetts, the son of Marjorie Minkin, an abstract painter, and Robert Gordon, founder and former president and CEO of New England convenience store chain Store 24. Gordon attended the Solomon Schechter Day School of Greater Boston and Lincoln-Sudbury Regional High School. Gordon holds a bachelor's degree in Arts (he was originally an Electrical Engineering major) from the University of Vermont.

Gordon met Trey Anastasio, Jon Fishman, and Jeff Holdsworth while attending college at University of Vermont, where the rock band Phish formed in 1983. He answered a posted flyer hanging in the dorms at UVM by Trey Anastasio, looking for a bass player for a new band.

Gordon played many roles in Phish. Until the band became too big for self-management, he dealt with practically all public relations and fan communication, such as answering fan mail, managing funds and booking gigs. Gordon wrote a column titled "Mike's Corner" for the band's newsletter in the 1990s.

Musically, Gordon's influence is the most obvious in Phish's many different renditions of various bluegrass, calypso, and even traditional Jewish songs (Gordon is Jewish). He also contributed by singing, as well as writing lyrics. Gordon wrote 19 original Phish songs and co-authored 27 additional Phish tracks, including "Mound", "Train Song", "Round Room", "Sugar Shack," "Yarmouth Road," "555," "Say Something," "Waking Up Dead," and the band's third most-performed song historically: "Mike's Song." Gordon also practices transcendental meditation.

== Instruments and gear ==
Like Phish guitarist Trey Anastasio, Gordon used to play custom-made bass guitars built by Paul Languedoc. Gordon played two Languedoc bass guitars, including a "dragon" bass. These bass guitars employed custom wound pickups from Mørch guitars of Denmark.

Gordon began experimenting with a Modulus Quantum 5 bass guitar on stage with Phish as early as October 31, 1994. He made the switch to this instrument as his main bass at Phish's March 1, 1997, show at Markthalle in Hamburg, Germany to a Quantum 5 with two EMG DC pickups. He later acquired a TBX model which is the through-neck version of the same guitar. Gordon plays with a pick (Jim Dunlop 1.5mm triangular graphite picks) and Ken Smith Slickround™ (half flat) strings In 2023, Mike Gordon made a transition to using Serek bass guitars.

Gordon's signature sound is also attributable to an array of signal processing equipment including an ADA MB-1 pre-amp, an Ibanez flanger (used at the beginning of "Down with Disease"), a Lovetone Meatball envelope filter (also used at the beginning of "Down with Disease"), an Akai Deep Impact, an EHX Bass Micro-Synth, an EBS OctaBass and a Boss SYB-3, a Boss BF-2 flanger, an Eventide 4500 Harmonizer, an Eventide Eclipse and a Lexicon LXP-15.

Gordon has used a variety of amplifier and speaker combinations including the SWR SM-900 amp/Goliath 4x10" enclosure but lately has been playing through Eden WT-800 amps, a Meyer Sound CP-10 parametric EQ, and onward toward a Meyer Sound powered speaker system (two 750P 2x18 cabs and two UPA-1Ps with 12" low frequency drivers and 3" compression drivers).

=== Current gear ===
As of December 2012, Gordon uses Source Audio Bass Envelope Filter Pro, Source Audio Bass Distortion Pro, Eventide Eclipse, Eventide Space, MXR graphic EQ, Boss graphic EQ and Electro Harmonix Super Ego, The Meatball envelope filter by Lovetone™, an Ibanez stomp box flanger, and an Eventide 4500 Harmonizer.

He currently uses Eden WT 800 amp into a Meyers CP-10 parametric EQ, and onward toward a Meyers powered speaker system: One 750P 2×18 and one 750 PL 2 x 18, two UPA-1P on top. He goes straight to the Eden WT800 driving a single Eden 4×10 cab, sometimes enhancing with more Eden 18s and more power.

In 2014, Gordon commissioned custom moiré instruments for himself and guitarist Scott Murawski to work with stage props being used on his 2014 Spring Tour. The guitar and bass (crafted specifically for this tour by Ben Lewry of Oakland, California's Visionary Instruments) are hollow, with LEDs inside that make them glow, and moiré screens stretched across the front. The LEDs in the guitars are manipulated by the lighting director, swapping colors and flashing patterns in response to the music.

He has played banjo since 1994, performing the instrument in concert with Phish and Phil Lesh (albeit an electric banjo) and in the studio on the 2007 Bernie Worrell album Improvisczario.

== Projects ==
=== Mike Gordon (2015–present) ===
His current touring band (again billed as "Mike Gordon") is Scott Murawski on guitar, Robert Walter on B3 Organ & Synth, drummer John Morgan Kimock and percussionist Craig Myers. These band members have toured regularly with Gordon since 2015, with the exception of a tour in June 2023, which saw keyboardist Rachel Eckroth subbing for Robert Walter while he was on the road with Roger Waters. Gordon decided to tour as a quintet to differentiate his project's instrumentation from Phish.

In April 2017, Gordon and his bandmates recorded OGOGO, Mike's fifth studio album, as a band at Q Division in Boston. “All five of us decided not to do what we had done before, but to be fresher and try to find our own voices. That started happening in a some jams... I want things to be interesting in a way that would serve the song.” The album was produced by GRAMMY Award-winning Shawn Everett and was released on September 15, 2017.

In February 2023, Gordon announced his sixth solo record Flying Games, which was written and recorded during 2020’s lockdown, in his makeshift Megaplum home studio. The album was produced by Gordon, recorded by longtime collaborator Jared Slomoff, and mixed by six-time Grammy-winning engineer Shawn Everett (Alabama Shakes, The War on Drugs). Gordon brought in contributions from bandmates, Kimock, Walter, Myers, and Murawski. It was released May 12, 2023.

=== Mike Gordon (2008–2014) ===
His past touring band (and longest running touring project) was billed as "Mike Gordon" and included Scott Murawski on guitar, drummer Todd Isler, keyboard player Tom Cleary and percussionist Craig Myers.

Gordon toured with this band from Summer 2008 through April 2014. The band made its debut late night talk-show television appearance on February 11, as musical guests on Late Night with Jimmy Fallon, promoting Gordon's album Moss.

They played a small handful of dates in New England (and one date in Albany) in November and December 2011, including a show at The Egg in Albany, NY on December 11, 2011 that ended up being the focus of a live album Gordon released in 2013 simply called "The Egg". They again toured in March 2014 (and a few weekends in April) supporting Gordon's last solo album (co-written with band-mate Murawski) Overstep.

=== Mike Gordon and Leo Kottke ===
In 2002, Gordon recorded the album Clone with acoustic guitarist Leo Kottke. The duo reunited in 2005 for Sixty Six Steps, followed by a supporting tour.

In August 2019, Gordon confirmed that he and Kottke had returned to the studio to record a new album. In August 2020, Kottke and Gordon announced the release of the album, Noon, that month on Megaplum/ATO Records. It was their first collaboration since Sixty Six Steps and Kottke's first studio album since 2005. As had been previously rumored, Phish drummer Jon Fishman appeared on several tracks.

=== Benevento/Russo Duo and GRAB (2004–2006) ===
In 2004, Gordon performed with The Benevento-Russo Duo for several shows benefiting Headcount, a voter registration organization. The trio played a number of dates in late 2004 and 2005 including the Bonnaroo Music Festival in June 2005 and a New Year's Eve series of shows in Florida and the northeastern United States. Gordon has originally met Joe Russo through Ropeadope founder Andy Hurwitz from in 2003 and jammed together in a few informal settings, leading to the Headcount benefit.

In summer 2006, Gordon, along with Phish bandmate Trey Anastasio, again joined the Benevento-Russo Duo for a co-headlining tour with Phil Lesh and Friends before finishing the final leg of the tour on their own. The group performed various songs from each members' catalog, as well as a handful of brand new originals. The quartet parted ways after the tour ended in July.

=== Other projects ===
Gordon has played in several side-projects apart from Phish, including Grappa Boom with Jamie Masefield of the Jazz Mandolin Project, The Chieftains with Rosanne Cash, and Doug Perkins of Smokin' Grass. Gordon formed his own solo band featuring Josh Roseman, Scott Murawski, Julee Avallone, James Harvey, Gordon Stone, Jeannie Hill and Doug Belote in 2003.

He released his first solo album outside of Phish in 2003, entitled Inside In.

In summer 2004, Gordon produced musician Joey Arkenstat's first album, Bane. Gordon is also credited with providing vocals and shofar accompaniment. In December 2005, Gordon formed SerialPod with Anastasio and Grateful Dead drummer Bill Kreutzmann. The group debuted at the 17th annual Warren Haynes Christmas Jam in Asheville, North Carolina. In early 2006, Gordon teamed up with his mother, artist Marjorie Minkin, to present Another Side of In — a visual and audio art show featuring interactive sculptures created by Minkin and set to the music of Inside In. The interactive show appeared at the Boston Children's Museum beginning in January 2010.

Later in 2006, Gordon formed a honky-tonk band called Ramble Dove, consisting of himself, Brett Hughes, Neil Cleary, Marie Claire and Scott Murawski. The band came into fruition after Gordon's long-time stint as bass guitar player in a honky-tonk band led by Brett Hughes that performed each Tuesday night at the Burlington, Vermont, club, Radio Bean. The group performs a number of classic country songs and a few Gordon originals, such as "Ramble Dove", "Loosening Up The Rules" and the rare Phish song "Weekly Time".

In August 2006, Gordon joined the Rhythm Devils – a group featuring Kreutzmann, The Grateful Dead drummer Mickey Hart, guitarist Steve Kimock and a host of backup players. On January 2, 2007, Gordon appeared with a group billed as The House Band containing many former members of The Grateful Dead playing at a party in honor of the new leadership of the United States House of Representatives hosted by Nancy Pelosi. The group included Mickey Hart, Bill Kreutzmann, Bob Weir, Bruce Hornsby and Warren Haynes.

He joined Trey Anastasio at the first annual Rothbury Music Festival in July during his solo acoustic set. Anastasio and Phish drummer Jon Fishman joined Gordon for part of his set the same day. Gordon released an album entitled The Green Sparrow on Rounder Records on August 5, 2008.

On March 6, 2009, Mike reunited with Phish at the Hampton Coliseum. The band has toured regularly since Summer 2009.

Gordon finished writing and recording his next solo album, Moss, at his home studio in Vermont in May 2010. The album was released by Rounder Records on October 19. He explained that many of the songs on the new album "began as bass and drum jams" adding that it is "kind of bass-oriented. Not in that the bass is the lead, but that the rhythms and the patterns are bass centric. The uniqueness is centered on the bass. So the bass is the key instrument. On Inside In, the pedal steel is the key instrument and if you had to say it for Green Sparrow, maybe electric guitar. But this time it's the bass."

== Discography ==
=== Albums ===
- Clone (with Leo Kottke) (October 8, 2002)
- Inside In (August 26, 2003)
- Sixty Six Steps (with Leo Kottke) (August 23, 2005)
- Live From Bonnaroo 2005 (with the Benevento-Russo Duo) (July 18, 2006, recorded live in 2005)
- The Green Sparrow (August 5, 2008)
- Moss (October 19, 2010)
- Moss Remixes 7" vinyl (April 16, 2011 for Record Store Day)
- The Egg (April 30, 2013, recorded live in 2011)
- Overstep (February 25, 2014)
- The Last Step EP 10" vinyl (April 7, 2015)
- OGOGO (September 15, 2017)
- Noon (with Leo Kottke) (August 28, 2020)
- Flying Games (May 12, 2023)

== Live releases ==
- August 29, 2008 – Fox Theatre, Boulder, CO
- October 3, 2009 – Town Ballroom, Buffalo, NY
- November 26, 2010 – Port City Music Hall, Portland, ME
- November 16, 2010 – The Fine Line Music Cafe, Minneapolis, MN
- The Egg - Recorded Live December 11, 2011 at The Egg, Albany, NY
- Vancouver – Recorded Live March 22, 2014 at The Rio Theatre, Vancouver, BC, Canada
- June 28, 2015 – Union Transfer, Philadelphia, PA
- February 2, 2016 – Crystal Ballroom, Portland, OR
- December 3, 2016 – Variety Playhouse, Atlanta, GA

== Books ==
- Mike's Corner (May 1997, ISBN 9780821223895)

== Films ==
- Tracking (Phish, 1994)
- Outside Out (2000)
- Rising Low (2002)
- The Down with Disease music video for Phish

== Awards ==
- Sixty Six Steps won album of the year at the 2006 Jammy Awards.
- Rising Low was the winner of the Joe Jarvis Audience Choice Award for Best Documentary at the 2002 Newport International Film Festival.
- Outside Out received the audience award at the South by Southwest festival.
