= West Texas Walk of Fame =

Coordinates: 33.578192°N 101.843534°W

The West Texas Walk of Fame
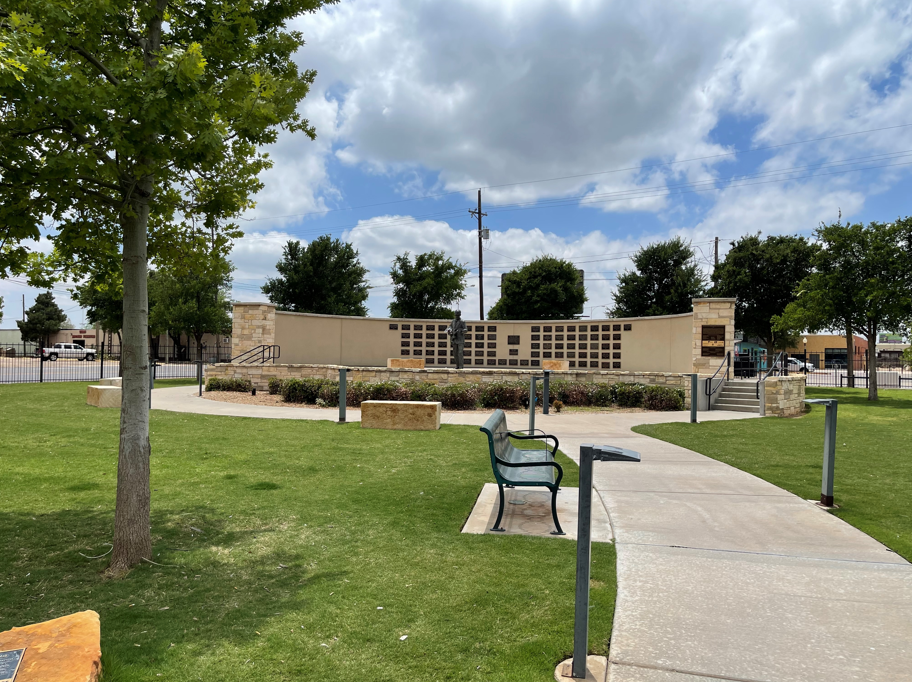
- View of The West Texas Walk of Fame
- Interactive map of The West Texas Walk of Fame
- Location: Lubbock, Texas
- Opening date: 2011
- Website: www.civiclubbock.org

The West Texas Walk of Fame honors those individuals who have an affiliation to Lubbock and the West Texas area and have devoted much of their lives to the development of and/or gained recognition in the promotion or production of the arts, music and entertainment.

== Formation ==
The concept of a Walk of Fame for West Texas began as an idea between Waylon Jennings, Larry Corbin and Jerry Coleman as a way to recognize the Lubbock born Buddy Holly. This idea quickly grew into a way of honoring the numerous artists and musicians that came from West Texas. In 1979, Buddy Holly was the first inductee into the Walk of Fame, during which a concert took place to raise money for a statue and plaque in his honor. The following year, Waylon Jennings who prompted the initial idea, was himself inducted as the second member of the West Texas Walk of Fame.

== Continuation ==
In 1983, Lubbock non-profit group, Civic Lubbock, Inc. was asked to administer the Walk of Fame and have annually nominated and inducted many West Texas artists. In 2011, the City of Lubbock moved the West Texas Walk of Fame to its new home at the Buddy and Maria Elena Holly Plaza located at 19th Street and Crickets Avenue. The plaza houses the original Buddy Holly statue and the bronze plaques for every inductee.

== Inductees ==
Inductees are nominated by the Walk of Fame Committee portion of Civic Lubbock, Inc. These nominations are submitted to the Civic Lubbock, Inc. Board and voted on for approval.

Criteria to be eligible for nomination includes:

- Inductees must have a significant connection to Lubbock or the West Texas area which is defined as follows: inductees must have been born in or spent much of their formative or creative years in Lubbock or the West Texas area.
- Inductees must have devoted a significant part of their lives to the development and production of the performing and visual arts and their body of work has been influential nationally in one or more of these areas.

The following lists the current Walk of Fame inductees and the year of their induction.

Year	Inductee/s
1979	Buddy Holly
1980	Waylon Jennings
1981	No inductee
1982	No inductee
1983	Mac Davis
1984	Jimmy Dean, Ralna English, Bobby Keys
1985	G. W. Bailey, Barry Corbin
1986	Niki Sullivan, Jerry Allison and Joe B. Mauldin (The Crickets), Sonny Curtis
1987	No inductee
1988	Tanya Tucker
1989	Roy Orbison, Joe Ely
1990	Gatlin Brothers, Bob Wills
1991	Thomas Lesslie "Snuff" Garrett
1992	No inductee
1993	The Maines Brothers Band
1994	Virgil Johnson of The Velvets, Buddy Knox
1995	Gary P. Nunn, Glen D. Hardin
1996	Woody Chambliss, Paul Milosevich, Bob Montgomery, The Hometown Boys, C.B. "Stubb" Stubblefield, Cecil Caldwell
1997	Terry Allen, Dan Blocker, Glenna Maxey Goodacre, Dirk West, George Ashburn, Los Premiers
1998	Butch Hancock, Jimmie Dale Gilmore, Don Caldwell, John Hartin
1999	Jane Prince Jones, Ed Wilkes
2000	Eddie Dixon
2001	The Fireballs, Delbert McClinton
2002	Helen Wagner, Brad Maule, Suzanne Aker, Pete Morales
2003	Alvin G. Davis, Billy Walker
2004	Clif Magness, Richie McDonald
2005	Agnes Torres, Angela Strehli
2006	David Box, David Gaschen, Jennifer Smith
2007	No inductee
2008	John Gillas, Mary Gillas
2009	No inductee
2010	Bill Griggs
2011	No inductee
2012	Charlene Condray Hancock, Tommy X Hancock, Lloyd Maines, Jesse "Guitar" Taylor
2013	No inductee
2014	Jay Boy Adams, Lew Dee & Diana Dee, Andy Wilkinson, Jaston Williams
2015	Jo Harvey Allen, Natalie Maines
2016	Ponty Bone, Terry Cook, The Flatlanders, Sonny West
2017	James "JT" Braxton, Thomas Braxton, Johnny Ray Watson
2018	Josh Abbott, Donnie Allison, Bob Livingston, Garland A. Weeks
2019	Susan Graham, David Kneupper, Romeo Reyna, Larry Trider
2020	No inductee
2021	No inductee
2022	Bess Hubbard, Hoyle Nix, Jody Nix, Amanda Shires
2023	Dirk Fowler, Lynwood Kreneck, Junior Medlow, Kimmie Rhodes
2024	Gerald Dolter, Tina Fuentes, Steve Meador, James Watkins
2025	Flatland Cavalry, Hector Galán, James W. Johnson, Jerry Jordan
