= Butch Hancock discography =

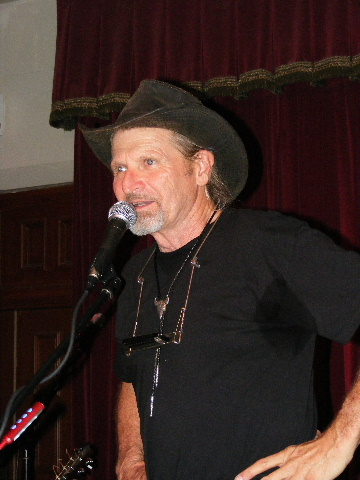
- Butch Hancock in 2010 at Cactus Cafe in Austin, Texas. Photo by Ron Baker.
- Studio albums: 12
- Compilation albums: 2
- Singles: 2

Butch Hancock is a country and folk music recording artist and songwriter. His discography consists of 12 studio albums, 2 singles, and 2 compilations. In addition, his songs have been performed on numerous albums by other artists.

== Studio albums ==
- 1978: West Texas Waltzes And Dust-Blown Tractor Tunes (Rainlight)
- 1979: The Wind's Dominion (Rainlight)
- 1980: Diamond Hill (Rainlight)
- 1981: 1981: A Spare Odyssey (Rainlight) - LP only, not on CD
- 1981: Fire-water…Seeks Its Own Level (Rainlight)
- 1986: Split & Slide II (Rainlight) - cassette only, hand-written insert
- 1990: No Two Alike (Rainlight) - 14 cassettes: not on CD
- 1993: Own The Way Over Here (Sugar Hill)
- 1994: Eats Away The Night (Sugar Hill)
- 1995: Chippy (Hollywood) with Joe Ely, Terry Allen, Robert Earl Keen, Wayne Hancock, Jo Harvey Allen, and Jo Carol Pierce
- 1997: You Coulda Walked Around The World (Rainlight)
- 2006: War And Peace (Two Roads)

== Compilations ==
- 1989: Own & Own (Glitterhouse) 2LP UK release
- 1993: Own the Way Over Here (Sugar Hill) includes two previously unissued tracks

== Singles ==
- 1979: "Wild Horses Chase The Wind" / "Smokin' In The Rain" (Rainlight)
- 1979: "The Wind's Dominion (solo)" / "The Wind's Dominion (band)"

== As a member of the Flatlanders ==
- 1980: One Road More (Charly)
- 1990: More A Legend Than A Band (Rounder) - initially released in 1976 as All American Music in a limited run on 8-track tape
- 1995: "Unplugged" (Sun) - recorded in March, 1972
- 2002: Now Again (New West)
- 2003: Wheels of Fortune (New West)
- 2004: Live at the One Knite: June 8th 1972 (New West)
- 2004: Live From Austin TX DVD (New West)
- 2009: Hills And Valleys (New West)
- 2012: The Odessa Tapes (New West) - unreleased 1972 recordings

== Collaborations ==
=== With Marce LaCouture ===
- 1985: Yella Rose (Rainlight)
- 1987: Cause Of The Cactus (Rainlight) - cassette only: live Feb. 27, 1987 at the Cactus Cafe

=== With Jimmie Dale Gilmore ===
- 1990: Two Roads: Live In Australia (Rainlight)

=== With the Threadgill Troubadours ===
- 1991: Threadgill's Supper Session (Watermelon)

== As composer ==
=== 1976 - 1979 ===
- 1976: Jerry Jeff Walker - It's a Good Night for Singin' (MCA) - track 2, "Standin' at The Big Hotel"
- 1977: Joe Ely - Joe Ely (MCA) - track 3, "She Never Spoke Spanish to Me"; track 5, "Suckin' a Big Bottle Of Gin"; track 6, "Tennessee's Not the State I'm In"; track 7, "If You Were a Bluebird"
- 1978: Jerry Jeff Walker - Contrary to Ordinary (MCA) - track 3, "Suckin' a Big Bottle of Gin"
- 1978: Joe Ely - Honky Tonk Masquerade (MCA) - track 3, "Boxcars"; track 4, "Jericho (Your Walls Must Come Tumbling Down)"; track 9, "West Texas Waltz"
- 1979: Joe Ely - Down on the Drag (MCA) - track 1, "Fools Fall In Love"; track 3, "Standin' At The Big Hotel"; track 6, "In Another World"; track 8, "Down on the Drag"

=== 1980 - 1989 ===
- 1980: Jenny Peters - This is Jenny Peters (Redball) - track 2, "He'll Be Anybody's Darling but Mine"
- 1981: Joe Ely - Musta Notta Gotta Lotta (MCA) - track 3, "Wishin' for You"; trasck 9, "Road Hawg"
- 1981: Joe Ely - Live Shots (MCA) - track 7, "She Never Spoke Spanish to Me"; track 9, "Fools Fall In Love"; track 10, "Boxcars"
- 1981: Sir Douglas Quintet - Border Wave (Chrysalis) - track 4, "I Keep Wishing for You"
- 1987: Joe Ely - Lord of the Highway (Hightone) - track 1"Lord of the Highway"; track 9, "Row of Dominoes"
- 1988: Jimmie Dale Gilmore - Fair & Square (HighTone) - track 7, "Just a Wave, Not the Water"; track 9, "99 Holes"
- 1989: Emmylou Harris - Bluebird (Reprise) - track 10, "If You Were A Bluebird"
- 1989: Jimmie Dale Gilmore - Jimmie Dale Gilmore (HighTone) - track 3, "See the Way"; track 7, "Red Chevrolet"; track 9, "That Hardwood Floor"; track 10, "When the Nights are Cold"

=== 1990 - 1999 ===
- 1990: Joe Ely: Live at Liberty Lunch (MCA) - track 5, "Row of Dominoes"; track 13, "If You Were a Bluebird"
- 1990: Texas Tornados - Texas Tornados (Reprise) - track 8, "Bonito Es El Español"
- 1991: Jimmie Dale Gilmore - "After Awhile" (Elektra Nonesuch) - track 2, "My Mind's Got a Mind of Its Own"
- 1992: Flaco Jiménez - Partners (Reprise) - track 8, "West Texas Waltz"
- 1993: Jimmie Dale Gilmore - Spinning Around the Sun (Elektra / Rhino) - track 7, "Nothing of the Kind"; track 8, "Just a Wave, Not the Water"
- 1995: Joe Ely: Letter to Laredo (MCA) - track 8, "She Finally Spoke Spanish to Me"
- 1995: Rosie Flores - Rockabilly Filly (HighTone / Shout!) - track 5, "Boxcars"
- 1995: Texas Tornados - Live From Austin TX CD, DVD versions (New West) - track 10, "She Never Spoke Spanish To Me"
- 1995: Toni Price- Hey (Antone's) - track 10, "Bluebird"
- 1997: Albert & Gage - Jumpin' Tracks (MoonHouse) - track 11, "Boxcars"
- 1997: Mark Insley - Good Country Junk (Country Town) - track 10, "Just a Wave, Not the Water"
- 1998: Don McCalister, Jr. - Down in Texas (Appaloosa) - track 2, "Bluebird"
- 1999: Jesse Taylor - Texas Tattoo (Appaloosa) - track 4, "Naked Light of Day"

=== 2000 - 2009 ===
- 2000: Bill & Bonnie Hearne - Watching Life Through a Windshield (Back Porch) - track 8, "She Never Spoke Spanish to Me"
- 2000: Jimmie Dale Gilmore - One Endless Night (Rounder) - track 2, "Banks Of The Guadalupe"; track 10, "Ramblin' Man"
- 2000: Joe Ely: Live at the Cambridge Folk Festival (Strange Fruit) - track 2, "She Never Spoke Spanish to Me"; track 5, "Boxcars"
- 2000: Joe Ely - Live @ Antone's (Rounder) - track 12, "Road Hawg"
- 2000: The Piners - The Piners (Orchard) - track 12, "Boxcars"
- 2002: Tom Holliston - I Want You to Twist with Me (Spider Invasion) - track 10, "Boxcars"
- 2003: Joe Ely - Streets of Sin (Concord / New Rounder) - track 1, "Fightin' for My Life"; track 11, "Wind's Gonna Blow You Away"
- 2004: Rosie Flores - Single Rose (Durango Rose) - track "15, "Boxcars"
- 2004: Rosie Flores - Bandera Highway (HighTone / Shout!) - track 9, "Boxcars"
- 2005: Willie Nelson - Songs for Tsunami Relief: Austin to South Asia (Lost Highway) - track 4, "Boxcars" (with Joe Ely)
- 2006: Sir Douglas Quintet - Live From Austin TX CD or DVD (New West) recorded 1981 - track 6, "I Keep Wishing For You"
- 2006: Joe Ely and Joel Guzman - Live Cactus! (Rack 'Em) - track 10, "Wind's Gonna Blow You Away"
- 2006: Ärräpää Orchestra - On The Loose (Major Leidén) - track 4, "She Never Spoke Spanish To Me"
- 2007: John Train - Mesopotamia Blues (Chapter) - track 10, "Already Gone"
- 2007: Joe Ely - Happy Songs from Rattlesnake Gulch (Rack 'Em) - track 7, "Firewater"
- 2008: Eleanor McEvoy - Love Must Be Tough (Market Square / Moscodisc) - track 11, "He Never Spoke Spanish to Me"

=== 2010 - present ===
- 2010: John Train - All of Your Stories (Chapter 7) - track 14, "Boxcars"
- 2011: BettySoo and Doug Cox - Across The Borderline: Lie To Me (Borderline Talent) - track 4, "Boxcars"
- 2011: Joe Ely - Satisfied at Last (Rack 'Em) - track 6, "Leo and Leona"; track 10, "Circumstance"
- 2012: Marley's Ghost - Jubilee (Sage Arts) - track 10, "If You Were a Bluebird"
- 2014: Rootbeats with Bill Öhrström - Line Of Fools (Turenki Records) - Finland - track 2, "Fools Fall In Love"
- 2015: Joe Ely - Panhandle Rambler (Rack'em) - track 4, "When the Nights Are Cold"
- 2016: Flaco Jiménez - Live at Breminale, 2001 (MIG) - track 2, "She Never Spoke Spanish to Me"
- 2016: Bill Kirchen and Austin DeLone - Transatlanticana (Red House) - track 4, "Oxblood"

== As primary artist/song contributor ==
- 1978: various artists - Kerrville Folk Festival 1978 (PSG) - track 2, "Livin' on a Dry Land Farm" (with Joe Ely)
- 1993: various artists - KGSR Broadcasts, Vol 1 (KGSR) - track 11, "Moanin' of the Midnight Train"
- 1994: various artists - Pastures of Plenty: An Austin Celebration of Woody Guthrie (Dejadisc) - track 15, "Belle Starr"
- 2002: various artists - KGSR Broadcasts Vol. 10 (KGSR) - track 2-1, "I Had My Hopes Up High" (with the Flatlanders)

== Also appears on ==
- 1995: Richard Buckner - Bloomed (Deja Disc) - harmonica
- 1996: Bob Neuwirth - Look Up (Watermelon) - guitar, harmonica
- 2001: Mike Blakley - West of You (Swing Rider) - harmonica
- 2002: Delbert McClinton - Room to Breathe (New West) - harmony vocals
- 2007: Freddy Steady - Lucky 7 (SteadyBoy) - harmonica
