= Jimmie Dale Gilmore discography =

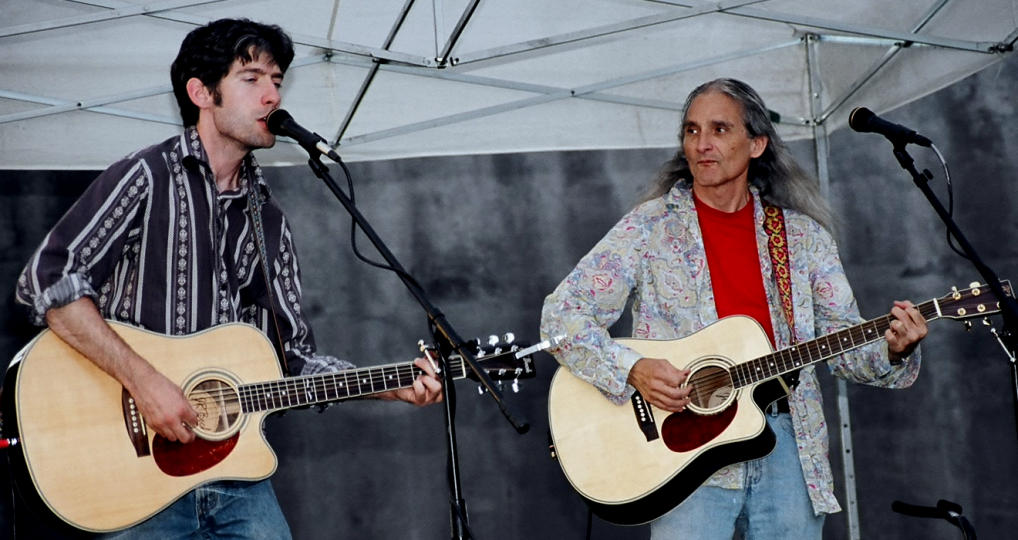
- Jimmie Dale Gilmore (right) with Colin Gilmore in June 2004 at Deep Eddy Pool in Austin Texas.
- Studio albums: 9
- EPs: 2
- Live albums: 1
- Compilation albums: 2
- Singles: 6

Jimmie Dale Gilmore is an American country singer, songwriter, actor, recording artist and producer. His discography consists of 9 studio albums, 1 live album, 2 compilations, 2 EPs, and 6 singles. In addition, his songs have been performed on numerous albums by other artists.

== Studio albums ==
Year	Album	Chart positions		Label
Year	Album	US Country	US Heat	Label
1988	Fair & Square	—	—	HighTone
1989	Jimmie Dale Gilmore	—	—	HighTone
1991	"After Awhile"	—	—	Elektra
1993	Spinning Around the Sun	62	27	Elektra
1996	Braver Newer World	—	19	Elektra
2000	One Endless Night	—	29	Rounder
2005	Come on Back	67	—	Rounder
2011	Heirloom Music (with The Wronglers)	64	50	Redeye
2018	Downey to Lubbock (with Dave Alvin)	41	2	Yep Roc
2024	TexiCali (with Dave Alvin)	-	-	Yep Roc
"—" denotes releases that did not chart

== Live albums ==
Year	Album	Label	Notes
1990	Two Roads: Live In Australia (with Butch Hancock)	Rainlight	March 22, 1990 at the Rose Shamrock and Thistle in Sydney; March 24, 1990 at the Club in Melbourne; and March 25, 1990, as part of the Brunswick Music Festival at Town Hall in Melbourne.

== Compilations ==
Year	Album	Label	Notes
1989	Jimmie Dale Gilmore / Fair And Square	Demon	A compilation of both albums.
2004	Don't Look For A Heartache	HighTone	Compiles tracks from Fair and Square and Jimmie Dale Gilmore plus the bonus track "Rambling Man."

== EPs ==
Year	Title	Label	Tracks
1994	Mudhoney • Jimmie Dale Gilmore	Sub Pop	1. "Tonight I Think I'm Gonna Go Downtown" (Mudhoney); 2. "Blinding Sun" (Gilmore); 3. "Buckskin Stallion Blues" (Gilmore w/ Mudhoney); 4. "Tonight I Think I'm Gonna Go Downtown" (Gilmore); 5. "Blinding Sun" (Mudhoney)
2006	Rhino Hi-Five: Jimmie Dale Gilmore	Rhino	1. "Tonight I Think I'm Gonna Go Downtown"; 2. "My Mind's Got a Mind of Its Own"; 3. "Braver Newer World"; track 4. "Reunion", track 5. "Black Snake Moan"

== Singles ==
Year	Single	US Country	Album	Label	Notes
1984	"She's All Grown Up" / "Honky Tonk Masquerade"			Spur	Artist name is listed as "Jimmie Gilmore."
1988	"White Freight Liner Blues" / "Trying To Get To You"	72	Fair and Square	HighTone	
1989	"Honky Tonk Song"	85	Jimmie Dale Gilmore	HighTone	
1991	"My Mind's Got A Mind Of Its Own"		After Awhile	Elektra	
1994	"Blinding Sun"			Sub Pop	Split single with Mudhoney: cover of a Mudhoney song.
2000	"No Lonesome Tune"		One Endless Night	Rounder	Promotional only.

== As a member of the Flatlanders ==
- 1980: One Road More (Charly)
- 1990: More A Legend Than A Band (Rounder) – initially released in 1976 as All American Music in a limited run on 8-track tape
- 1995: "Unplugged" (Sun) – recorded in March, 1972
- 2002: Now Again (New West)
- 2003: Wheels of Fortune (New West)
- 2004: Live at the One Knite: June 8th 1972 (New West)
- 2004: Live From Austin TX DVD (New West)
- 2009: Hills And Valleys (New West)
- 2012: The Odessa Tapes (New West) – unreleased 1972 recordings

== As primary artist/song contributor ==
- 1992: various artists – Across The Great Divide: Songs of Jo Carol Pierce (Deja Disc) – track 9, "Reunion"
- 1994: various artists – Red Hot + Country (Mercury Nashville) – track 6, "Crazy" (with Willie Nelson)
- 1994: various artists – Where Are My Headphones? Live From Studio A. Volume 2 (WCBE) – track 4, "Mobile Line"
- 1995: various artists – Texans Live from Mountain Stage (Blue Plate) – track 6, "Just a Wave"
- 2001: various artists – Daddy-O Daddy! Rare Family Songs of Woody Guthrie (Rounder) – track 2, "Want to See Me Grow" and track 12, "Tippy Tap Toe" (both with Joe Ely)
- 2004: various artists – Merlefest Live! The Best of 2003 (Merlefest) – track 6, "Go to Sleep Alone"
- 2005: various artists – A Tribute to Billy Joe Shaver – Live (Compadre Records) – track 4, "Heart-A-Bustin'" (with Colin Gilmore)

== As composer ==
- 1977: Joe Ely – Joe Ely (MCA) – track 8, "Treat Me Like A Saturday Night"
- 1978: Joe Ely – Honky Tonk Masquerade (MCA) – track 5, "Tonight I Think I'm Gonna Go Downtown" (co-written with John Reed)
- 1981: Joe Ely – Musta Notta Gotta Lotta (MCA) – track 2, "Dallas"
- 1985: Nanci Griffith – Poet in My Window (Philo) – track 10, "Tonight I Think I'm Gonna Go Downtown" (co-written with John Reed)
- 1990: Joe Ely – Live At Liberty Lunch (MCA) – track 6, "Dallas"
- 1994: F.S.K. – The German-American Octet (Return To Sender) German release – track 11, "Dallas"
- 1996: James Moody – Return from Overbrook (GRP) – track 6, "There She Goes" (co-written with James Moody)
- 1997: Albert & Gage – Jumpin' Tracks (MoonHouse) – track 7, "Now That You're Gone" (co-written with Chris Gage and Paul Pearcy)
- 1997: Jack Ingram – Livin' or Dyin' (Rising Tide) – track 12, "Dallas"
- 1997: Diane Schuur – Blues for Schuur (GRP) – track 4, "These Blues" (co-written with Charles Brown)
- 1998: Erik Moll – Most Of All (Fire Ant) – track 12, "I Love Your Cookin'" (co-written with Erik Moll)
- 2006: Laurie Lewis and the Right Hands – The Golden West (HighTone) – track 10, "River Under The Road" (co-written with Ana Egge and Sarah Brown)
- 2007: M. Ward – To Go Home (Merge) – track 4, "Headed For A Fall" (co-written with David Hammond and Kevin Welch)
- 2009: Dave Alvin – Dave Alvin and the Guilty Women (Yep Roc) – track 8, "River Under The Road"
- 2015: Eriksson Delcroix – In Nashville, Tennessee (Waste My Records / Dim Din) Belgium – track 8, "Tonight I Think I'm Gonna Go Downtown" (co-written with John Reed)
- 2015: Old Testament – Old Testament (XEMU) – track 5, "Dallas"
- 2015: Ruby Amanfu – Standing Still (Arrival) – track 2, "Where You Going" (co-written with David Hammond)

== Also appears on ==
- 1978: The Supernatural Family Band – Texas Inlaws (Akashic Records) – vocals on track 4, "Ramblin' Man"
- 1979: Butch Hancock – The Wind's Dominion (Rainlight) – vocals
- 1981: Butch Hancock – Firewater (Seeks Its Own Level) (Rainlight) – vocals
- 1991: various artists – Threadgill's Supper Session (Watermelon) – vocals
- 1991: Butch Hancock – Own & Own (Sugar Hill) – vocals
- 1997: Hackberry Ramblers – Deep Water (Hot Biscuits) – vocals
- 1997: Tom Russell – The Long Way Around (HighTone) vocals on track 4, "Beyond The Blues"
- 1998: The Pine Valley Cosmonauts – Salute The Majesty Of Bob Wills – The King Of Western Swing (Bloodshot) – vocals on track 2, "Trouble In Mind"
- 2000: John Wesley Harding – The Confessions Of St. Ace (Mammoth) – vocals on track 7, "Bad Dream Baby"
- 2006: Butch Hancock – War And Peace (Two Roads) – backing vocals
- 2015: Tom Russell – The Rose of Roscrae (Proper) – vocals, guitar
