= Chippy (album) =

Album music from the musical, Chippy

Studio album by Joe Ely, Terry Allen, Butch Hancock, Robert Earl Keen, Wayne Hancock, Jo Harvey Allen, Jo Carol Pierce
- Released: 1994
- Recorded: February – March, 1994
- Studios: Spur, Austin, TX
- Genre: Texas Country
- Label: Hollywood
- Producers: Joe Ely, Terry Allen

Chippy, also known as Songs from "Chippy", is an album by Terry Allen, Joe Ely, Butch Hancock, Robert Earl Keen, Wayne Hancock, Jo Harvey Allen, and Jo Carol Pierce. It contains original music from the musical, Chippy, which was written by Jo Harvey and Terry Allen and commissioned by the American Music Theater Festival, Philadelphia, where it received its world premiere in 1994. The setting of the musical is West Texas in the 1930s.

== Production ==
The album was recorded at Joe Ely's home studio. It was produced by Ely and Terry Allen.

== Critical reception ==
Professional ratings
Review scores
Source	Rating
AllMusic	3.5/5 stars
Robert Christgau	(3-star Honorable Mention)
MusicHound Folk: The Essential Album Guide	3/5 stars

The Los Angeles Times called Chippy "one of the best albums of the year in country music, or any other genre," writing that "crusty singing voices abound, and they are utterly persuasive in creating the illusion that we are listening to people who moved across a landscape of barrooms and oil fields more than 50 years ago." The Orlando Sentinel wrote that "it's particularly wonderful to hear Ely back in an acoustic country vein, especially with his former bandmate Lloyd Maines on steel guitar and dobro." Spin deemed it "a dusty grab bag of gritty and smart West Texas tunery." The Santa Fe New Mexican opined that "even without the benefit of the dialogue and sets, however, the Songs From Chippy set makes an evocative, moving collection centered on our particularly American obsession with the open road." Rolling Stone wrote that it "captures the uneven stage show's high points; spoken-word snippets are inserted between the best songs."

== Track listing ==
1. "Goodnight Dear Diary" (Joe Ely)
2. "Across the Great Divide" (Jo Carol Pierce)
3. "Chippy Narration"
4. "Buildin' More Fires" (Joe Ely)
5. "Wind's Gonna Blow You Away" (Butch Hancock)
6. "Gonna California" (Terry Allen)
7. "Thunderstorms & Neon Signs" (Wayne Hancock)
8. "Fate with a Capital F" (Joe Ely, Butch Hancock, Terry Allen)
9. "The Way I Was Raised" (Jo Harvey Allen)
10. "Cup of Tea" (Joe Ely, Jo Harvey Allen)
11. "Tongues"
12. "Low Lights of Town" (Butch Hancock)
13. "I Blame God" (Jo Carol Pierce)
14. "Oil Wells"
15. "Cold Black Hammer" (Joe Ely)
16. "Boomtown Boogie" (Butch Hancock, Terry Allen, Joe Ely, J. Allen)
17. "Back to Black" (Terry Allen)
18. "Just Dancin"
19. "Whiskey and Women and Money to Burn" (Joe Ely)
20. "Morning Goodness" (Butch Hancock)
21. "Angels of the Wind" (Terry Allen)
22. "Roll Around" (Butch Hancock)
23. "Goodnight" (Joe Ely)

== Personnel ==
- Terry Allen
- Joe Ely
- Butch Hancock
- Robert Earl Keen
- Wayne Hancock
- Jo Harvey Allen
- Jo Carol Pierce
- Lloyd Maines
- Davis McLarty
- Richard Bowden
- Glenn Fukunaga
- John Ely
- Dee White
- Barry Tubb
- T.J. McFarland
- Sharon Ely
- Marie Elena Ely
- Kimmy Rhodes
- Roggie Baer
