= Wayne Hancock =

American singer-songwriter

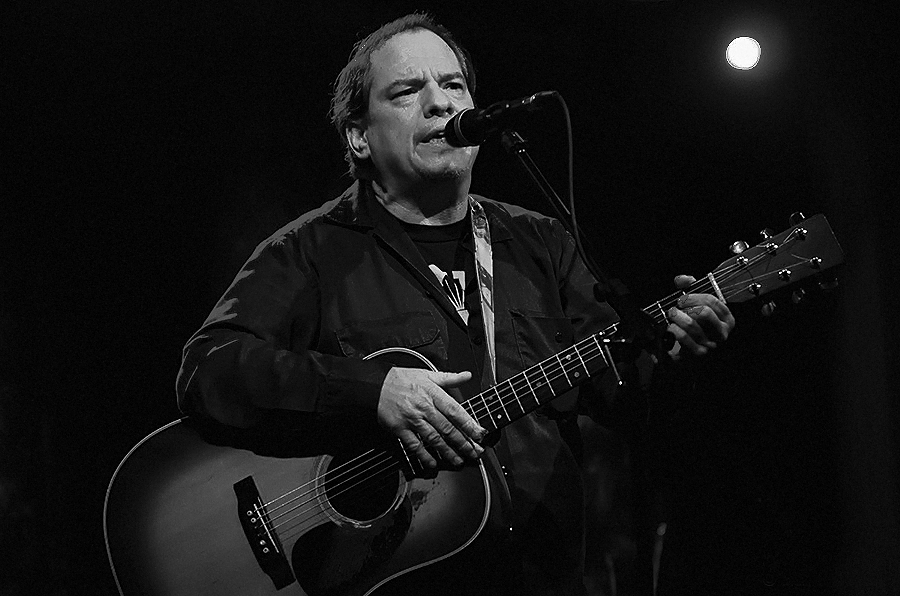
- Wayne Hancock in 2019

Background information
- Also known as: Wayne "The Train" Hancock, "The King of Juke Joint Swing"
- Born: Thomas Wayne Hancock III; May 1, 1965 (age 61)
- Origin: Dallas, Texas
- Genre: Alternative country
- Occupations: Singer, songwriter
- Instruments: Singing guitar
- Years active: 1977–present
- Labels: Deja Disc, Ark 21, Bloodshot
- Website: waynehancock.com

Thomas Wayne Hancock III (born May 1, 1965, in Dallas, Texas) better known as Wayne "The Train" Hancock, is an American singer-songwriter. Known as "The King of Juke Joint Swing," his performances incorporate jazz, blues, western swing, country and rockabilly, styles of music that he began listening to as a kid. His influences include Jimmie Rodgers, Glenn Miller, Tommy Dorsey, Hank Thompson, Hank Williams and Hank Snow because they were all in his parents' record collection.

Throughout his childhood, Hancock moved around seven times because his father was a Design engineer who worked at various engineering firms around the United States. Shortly after discovering country music, Hancock began writing songs at the age of twelve. Hancock's vocal style was initially influenced by Hank Williams, and he has been compared to him throughout his career.

At eighteen years old, Hancock won the Wrangler Country Showdown contest. The son of a WWII veteran, Hancock joined the United States Marine Corps immediately after winning the contest and was shipped to recruit training. Hancock served in the military for four years. During a six-month deployment at Camp Hansen in Okinawa, Japan, he wrote one of his most well known songs, "Cold Lonesome Wind" from Thunderstorms and Neon Signs.

In 1990, Hancock moved to Austin, Texas. In 1994, he met Lubbock, Texas native Joe Ely, a member of the Flatlanders at the Continental Club in, Austin, Texas. Shortly thereafter, Hancock landed a role in Terry Allen and Jo Harvey Allen's play, Chippy. Jimmie Dale Gilmore of the Flatlanders originally played Hancock's character Mr. Jukebox. When Gilmore was unable to do the second run of the play, Ely brought Hancock in, saying "This guy sounds just like Hank Williams, he'd be perfect." From there, Hancock joined the cast and went into the studio to record "Thunderstorms and Neon Signs," for the soundtrack. It was his first recording of the song.

Hancock met Grammy Award winning producer, pedal steel player, and Lubbock, Texas native, Lloyd Maines when Maines was running sound for Chippy. Maines has produced all of Hancock's albums, dating back to his 1995 debut, Thunderstorms and Neon Signs, released on Deja Disc Records. The album sold 22,000 copies in the first year. The follow-up was Hancock's sophomore 1997 album, That's What Daddy Wants released on Ark 21. Hancock gained the nickname The Train because of his marathon length shows, going on for 3, 4, even 5 hours long."

On his debut 1999 album, Risin' Outlaw, Hank Williams III, grandson of Hank Williams Sr., covered two songs from Thunderstorms and Neon Signs, the title track, and "Why Don't You Leave Me Alone." He also recorded "87 Southbound," from That's What Daddy Wants.

In April 2014, Hancock was involved in a serious motorcycle accident, which left him with a fractured elbow and a collapsed lung. He was forced to cancel several months' worth of tour dates due to the wreck, but by the end of the year he was fully recovered and back on the road. In 2016, Hancock returned to the studio with producer Lloyd Maines to cut his eighth studio album Slingin' Rhythm.

== Discography ==
Title	Album details	Peak positions
Title	Album details	US Country
Thunderstorms and Neon Signs	Release date: September 19, 1995; Label: Deja Disc	—
That's What Daddy Wants	Release date: August 26, 1997; Label: Ark 21 Records	—
Thunderstorms and Neon Signs	Release date: March 24, 1998; Label: Ark 21 Records	—
Wild, Free & Reckless	Release date: July 27, 1999; Label: Ark 21 Records	—
The South Austin Sessions	Release date: September 1, 2001; Label: Bloodshot Records	—
A-Town Blues	Release date: September 4, 2001; Label: Bloodshot Records	—
Swing Time	Release date: August 19, 2003; Label: Bloodshot Records	—
The Best of Wayne Hancock	Release date: April 26, 2005; Label: Ark 21 Records	—
Tulsa	Release date: October 10, 2006; Label: Bloodshot Records	—
Viper of Melody	Release date: April 21, 2009; Label: Bloodshot Records	—
Ride	Release date: February 25, 2013; Label: Bloodshot Records	68
Slingin' Rhythm	Release date: October 28, 2016; Label: Bloodshot Records	—
"—" denotes releases that did not chart
