= Larry Monroe Forever Bridge =

Memorial mural in Austin, Texas, U.S.

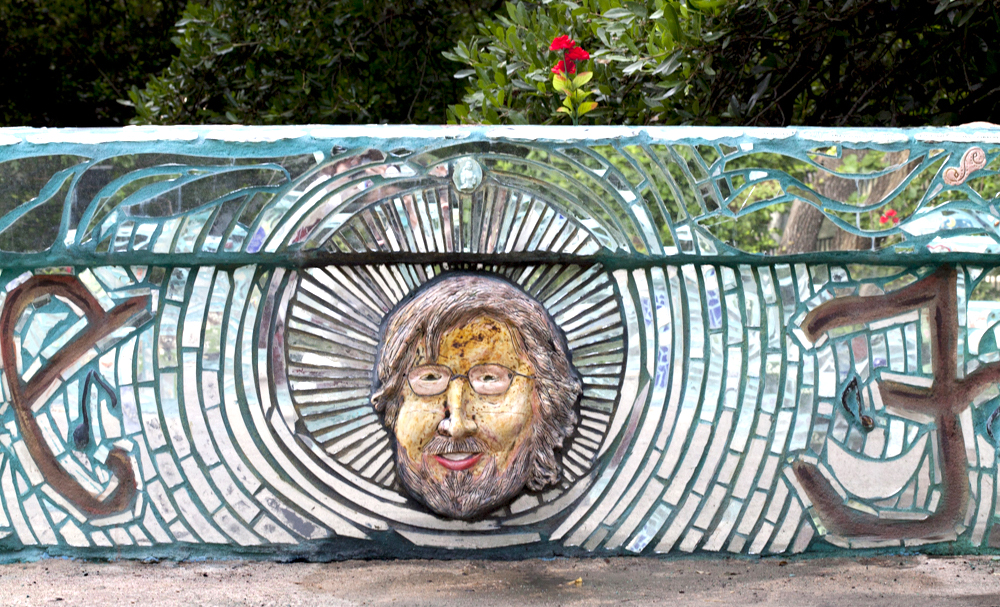
- Bridge decorated with mosaic art to honor the legacy of Austin radio personality Larry Monroe
- Artist: Stefanie Distefano, et al.
- Completion date: 20 June 2015
- Location: Austin, Texas, U.S.
- 30.247540°N 97.744402°W
- Owner: Art in Public Places, City of Austin, TX

The Larry Monroe Forever Bridge is a bridge mural and memorial to Austin broadcaster and musical scholar Larry Monroe. The bridge's two low walls are decorated with mosaic tiles relating to Monroe and the music he played on Austin radio for more than 30 years. Artist Stefanie Distefano designed and directed the project. The bridge is located on East Side Drive as it crosses Blunn Creek between Stacy Park and Little Stacy Park in the Travis Heights neighborhood in South Austin, Texas.

== History ==
An Austin radio disc jockey for more than thirty years, Monroe promoted Austin singer-songwriters and Austin-produced music on his programs. After he died in January 2014, his fans and friends wanted to honor his life and his contribution to music in Austin. His companion, Ave Bonar, suggested the idea for the mosaic bridge and commissioned mosaic artist Stefanie Distefano to design the project. Together they supervised over 100 volunteers who fabricated mosaic tiles made to look like radios, cassette tapes, ceramic portraits, and dozens of other representations of Monroe’s life and career, including replicas of his signature Segway license plate and a replica of the logo featured on his website, designed by artist Sam Hurt. The bridge features tiles depicting vinyl records with names of artists and songs that represent the range of music that Monroe enjoyed, as well as tiles containing lyrics by a few of the musicians whose music he played, including a 22-foot musical score from the Townes Van Zandt song "To Live Is to Fly". The project was supported by the Austin Art in Public Places program, the Austin Arts Commission, the South River City Citizens, and private donations.

On June 18, 2015, the Austin City Council passed resolution No.20150618-086, officially naming the bridge in recognition of the legacy of Larry Monroe. At a dedication ceremony on June 20, 2015, Mayor Pro Tem Kathie Tovo accepted the artwork on behalf of the City of Austin.

=== Partial list of mosaic tiles ===
Sources:

- Austin Lounge Lizards (Note: Austin musician) (Note: partial lyrics)
- Marcia Ball
- Joe Ely
- Blaze Foley†
- Butch Hancock
- Stevie Ray Vaughan† (Note: record)
- Doug Sahm†
- Darden Smith
- Townes Van Zandt †
- Carolyn Wonderland
- David Rodriguez†
- Fred Neil†
- Jennifer Warnes (Note: musician)with Doyle Bramhall †
- Jimmie Dale Gilmore
- Kent Dykes
- Kimmie Rhodes
- Laurie Freelove†
- Leeann Atherton
- Uncle Walt's Band†
- Carrie Rodriguez
- Sara Hickman
- Greezy Wheels
- Steven Fromholz†
- Beto y Los Fairlanes
- Christine Albert
- James Cotton†
- Chuck Berry† (Note: frequently played by Monroe)
- Johnny Cash†
- Nervous Norvus†
- The Big Bopper†
- Unknown Hinson
- Tony Joe White†
- Junior Brown
- Sonny Boy Williamson II†
- Lavelle White

== Events ==
Friends of Monroe and guest musicians meet at the bridge annually, near the end of August, the anniversary of Monroe's birth, to perform and celebrate his life.

== See also ==
- South River City, Austin, Texas
- South Congress

== Notes ==
†deceased
