= Thunderstorms and Neon Signs =

Thunder storms & Neon Signs

Studio album by Wayne Hancock
- Released: 1995, Re-released on March 7, 2000
- Genre: Country
- Label: Dejadisc
- Producer: Lloyd Maines

Wayne Hancock chronology
Thunder storms & Neon Signs (1995)	That's What Daddy Wants (1997)

Professional ratings
Review scores
Source	Rating
AllMusic	4./5 stars

Thunderstorms & Neon Signs is the debut album by American country musician Wayne Hancock. It was released in 1995 on Dejadisc. It was reissued by Ark21 in 1998. The album’s title track was covered by Hank Williams III on his debut album Risin' Outlaw.

== Track listing ==
All songs written by Wayne Hancock; except where noted

1. "Juke Joint Jumping" – 3:18
2. "Poor Boy Blues" – 2:20
3. "Thunderstorms and Neon Signs" – 3:42
4. "She's My Baby" – 2:31
5. "Big City Good Time Gal" – 2:57
6. "Ain't Nobody's Blues But My Own" – 4:06
7. "Double A Daddy" – 3:25
8. "Why Don't You Leave Me Alone" – 2:50
9. "Tag Along" – 2:18
10. "Cold Lonesome Wind" – 4:24
11. "Locomotive Joe" – 2:11
12. "No Loving Tonight" – 1:39
13. "Friday and Saturday Night" – 2:36
14. "Summertime" – 5:42 (DuBose Heyward, George Gershwin, Ira Gershwin)

== Personnel ==
- Wayne Hancock – Acoustic guitar and vocals
- Rebecca Hancock Snow – Vocals
- Paul Skelton – Guitar
- Bob Stafford – Guitar
- Sue Foley – Guitar
- Ric Ramerez – Bass and background vocals
- Kevin Smith – Bass
- Herb Steiner – Steel guitar
- Lloyd Maines – Steel guitar
- Stan Smith – Clarinet
- Bill Madonado – Background vocals
