= One Endless Night =

Studio album by Jimmie Dale Gilmore
- Released: 2000
- Genre: Country
- Label: Windcharger/Rounder
- Producers: Buddy Miller, Jimmie Dale Gilmore

Jimmie Dale Gilmore chronology
Braver Newer World (1996)	One Endless Night (2000)	Don't Look for a Heartache (2004)

One Endless Night is an album by the American musician Jimmie Dale Gilmore, released in 2000. It peaked at No. 29 on Billboard's Top Heatseekers chart. Gilmore supported the album by touring with the Flatlanders.

== Production ==
The album was coproduced by Buddy Miller. It was recorded in Miller's Nashville house, using Pro Tools. Gilmore wrote three of the album's songs. "Banks of the Guadalupe" is a cover of the Butch Hancock song. "Your Love Is My Rest" was written by John Hiatt. "Defying Gravity" is a cover of the Jesse Winchester song; "No Lonesome Tune" is a cover of the Townes Van Zandt one. Gilmore slowed the arrangement of "Mack the Knife". Emmylou Harris and Victoria Williams were among the singers who provided backing vocals. "DFW" is a bonus track.

== Critical reception ==
Professional ratings
Review scores
Source	Rating
AllMusic	2.5/5 stars
Robert Christgau	(2-star Honorable Mention)
Entertainment Weekly	A
The Gazette	4.5/5 stars
Lincoln Journal Star	5/5 stars
Los Angeles Daily News	3/4 stars
Los Angeles Times	3/4 stars
Orlando Sentinel	5/5 stars
USA Today	3.5/4 stars
Vancouver Sun	4.5/5 stars

The Los Angeles Daily News wrote that "most of the cuts ... wistfully evoke the longing for lasting love—a topic the artist's masticating, caramel-and-chewing-tobacco vocals are sublimely suited to." The Los Angeles Times praised the "eerily loping rendition of 'Mack the Knife', as utterly unexpected as it is deliciously different from the Louis Armstrong/Bobby Darin swing approach." USA Today opined that "Gilmore's deliberative renderings are as engrossing as they are plaintive." Rolling Stone deemed the album "a first-rate Gilmore collection, full of enchanted cognition, major emotions and pure Texas dust."

The Washington Post concluded that "Gilmore has chosen bohemian numbers with gentle, beguiling melodies and lyrics that meditate on their subjects without ever judging them." The Chicago Tribune determined that "the West Texas legend brings a strange beauty to everything he sings, his voice an otherworldly warble that echoes the pathos of Hank Williams and Jimmie Rodgers, while at the same time floating dream-like above it all." Entertainment Weekly stated that Gilmore's "ethereal, oscillating tenor evokes the barren beauty of West Texas." The Guardian wrote that "his spare, sinewy voice resonates like a high wind on the prairie, and on this evidence Gilmore has never been in better shape as writer, musician and picker of material."

== Track listing ==
No.	Title	Length
1.	"One Endless Night"
2.	"Banks of the Guadalupe"
3.	"No Lonesome Tune"
4.	"Goodbye Old Missoula"
5.	"Georgia Rose"
6.	"Your Love Is My Rest"
7.	"Blue Shadows"
8.	"Defying Gravity"
9.	"Ripple"
10.	"Ramblin' Man"
11.	"Darcy Farrow"
12.	"Mack the Knife"
13.	"DFW"
