= Wild, Free & Reckless =

Studio album by Wayne Hancock
- Released: 1999
- Genres: Country, alt-country
- Label: Ark 21
- Producer: Lloyd Maines

Wayne Hancock chronology
That's What Daddy Wants (1995)	Wild, Free & Reckless (1999)	A-Town Blues (2001)

Professional ratings
Review scores
Source	Rating
AllMusic	3/5 stars

Wild, Free & Reckless is the third album by American country musician Wayne Hancock, released on August 3, 1999.

== Track listing ==
All songs written by Wayne Hancock except where noted.

1. "Kansas City Blues" (Ernest Tubb) 3:08
2. "Lookin' for Better Days" - 4:15
3. "Flatland Boogie" - 3:27
4. "Smell That Bread" - 2:58
5. "Blue Suede Shoes" (Carl Perkins)- 3:12
6. "Tonight the Rain Is Coming Down" - 3:30
7. "Drive On" - 5:11
8. "Going Back to Texas" - 3:29
9. "Wild, Free & Reckless" - 3:18
10. "That's Why I Ride" - 4:26
11. "It's Saturday Night" (Bill Mack) - 2:31
12. "Gone Gone Gone" - 2:56
13. "Gonna Be Some Trouble Tonite" - 2:35
14. "Mornin' Noon and Night" - 6:19
15. "You Don't Have to Cry" - 3:29

== Personnel ==
- Wayne Hancock – acoustic guitar and vocals
- Ric Ramerez - upright bass
- Jeremy Wakefield - steel guitar

== See also ==
- 1999 in music
