= Viper of Melody =

Studio album by Wayne Hancock
- Released: 2009
- Genres: Country, alt-country
- Length: 37:02
- Label: Ark 21
- Producer: Lloyd Maines

Wayne Hancock chronology
Tulsa (2006)	Viper of Melody (2009)	Ride (2013)

Professional ratings
Review scores
Source	Rating
AllMusic	4/5 stars

Viper of Melody is the sixth studio album, and ninth overall album released by American country musician Wayne Hancock, released on April 21, 2009.

== Track listing ==
All songs written by Wayne Hancock: except where noted

1. "Jump the Blues" - 2:19
2. "Driving My Young Life Away" - 1:53
3. "Viper of Melody" - 3:07
4. "Throwin' Away My Money" - 2:19
5. "Your Love and His Blood" - 2:06
6. "Working at Working" - 2:59
7. "Moving On #3" - 2:29
8. "Tropical Blues" - 3:40
9. "Dog House Blues" - 3:18
10. "High Rolling Train" - 4:04
11. "Midnight Stars and You" - 3:22 (James Campbell, Reginald Connelly, Harry Woods)
12. "Freight Train Boogie" - 2:02
13. "Lonesome Highway" - 3:31

== Personnel ==
- Wayne Hancock – Acoustic Guitar and vocals
- Anthony Locke - Steel Guitar
- Huckleberry Johnson - Upright Bass
- Izak Zaidman - Electric Guitar

== See also ==
- 2009 in music
