= Spinning Around the Sun =

Studio album by Jimmie Dale Gilmore
- Released: 1993
- Genre: Country music
- Length: 44:36
- Label: Elektra
- Producer: Emory Gordy Jr.

Jimmie Dale Gilmore chronology
"After Awhile" (1991)	Spinning Around the Sun (1993)	Braver Newer World (1996)

Professional ratings
Review scores
Source	Rating
AllMusic	3.5/5 stars
Robert Christgau	A
The New Rolling Stone Album Guide	4/5 stars
Spin Alternative Record Guide	9/10

Spinning Around the Sun is an album by country music singer-songwriter Jimmie Dale Gilmore. It was released in 1993 on Elektra Records, and was his second record for the label.

The album includes a duet with singer-songwriter Lucinda Williams, "Reunion."

== Critical reception ==
In The Village Voice's annual Pazz & Jop critics' poll for the year's best albums, Spinning Around the Sun finished at number 7.

Robert Christgau gave the album an A grade, writing: "I doubt I'll hear a more gorgeous country record--maybe a more gorgeous record--anytime soon." Mark Deming from AllMusic gave the record a 3.5-star rating, writing that "there are too many tunes that are beautiful but unremarkable, and beyond a near-definitive reworking of Butch Hancock's 'Just a Wave, Not the Water,' very little of this connects with the force of Gilmore's best work." The Orlando Sentinel wrote that "Gilmore's synthesis of country, folk and rock 'n' roll is as effortless as ever, and his voice is its old sweet, nasal self."

== Track listing ==
1. "Where You Going" (Jimmie Dale Gilmore, David Hammond) 4:21
2. "Santa Fe Thief" (A. B. Strehli, Jr.) 5:00
3. "I Was the One" (Hal Blair, Claude Demetrius, Bill Peppers, Aaron Schroeder) 3:15
4. "So I'll Run" (Strehli) 3:50
5. "I'm So Lonesome I Could Cry" (Hank Williams) 3:38
6. "Mobile Line" (Traditional) 3:43
7. "Nothing of the Kind" (Butch Hancock) 3:19
8. "Just a Wave, Not the Water" (Hancock) 4:02
9. "Reunion" (Jo Carol Pierce, Harry Porter) 2:54
  - with Lucinda Williams
10. "I'm Gonna Love You" (Gilmore) 3:46
11. "Another Colorado" (Gilmore) 3:31
12. "Thinking About You" (Gilmore) 3:17

== Personnel ==
- Jimmie Dale Gilmore - vocals, guitar
- Wes Starr, Harry Stinson - drums
- Emory Gordy, Jr. - bass
- Richard Bennett, James Burton, Steve Gibson, Chris Leuzinger, Gary Nicholson, Biff Watson - guitar
- Steve Fishell, Paul Franklin, Kayton Roberts - steel guitar
- Glen D. Hardin, Pete Wasner - keyboards, piano
- Glen Duncan, Stuart Duncan - fiddle, mandolin
- Al Perkins - dobro
- Joe Ely, Carmella Ramsey, Harry Stinson - backing vocals

== Production ==
- Produced By Emory Gordy, Jr.
- Engineers: Russ Martin
- Assistant Engineers: Terry Bates, Marc Frigo, Amy Hughes
- Mixing: Steve Tillisch

== Chart performance ==
Chart (1993)	Peak position
U.S. Billboard Top Country Albums	62
U.S. Billboard Top Heatseekers	27
