= That's What Daddy Wants =

Studio album by Wayne Hancock
- Released: August 26, 1997
- Genres: Country, alt-country
- Label: Ark 21
- Producer: Lloyd Maines

Wayne Hancock chronology
Thunderstorms and Neon Signs (1995)	That's What Daddy Wants (1997)	Wild, Free & Reckless (2001)

That's What Daddy Wants is the second album by the American musician Wayne Hancock, released in 1997 on Ark 21 Records.

== Production ==
Recorded in three days, the album was produced by Lloyd Maines. Joel Guzman played accordion on "87 Southbound". "Brand New Cadillac" was initially recorded for a Clash tribute album. Hancock used a drummer on three songs.

== Critical reception ==
Professional ratings
Review scores
Source	Rating
AllMusic	4/5 stars
Los Angeles Times	3/4 stars
Orlando Sentinel	4/5 stars

The Washington Post stated: "As a songwriter, Hancock simply recycles the two-step rhythms, three-chord changes, 12-bar blues, four-lane highways and two-women troubles of his favorite old records. He invests this ordinary material with exceptional life, however, thanks to the irresistible vitality of his vocals." The Los Angeles Times thought that the album "may be edgy, but it's the edginess of a guy having a good time playing music that's all the more fun because it is so out of step with the mannerly country music of current fashion."

AllMusic wrote that "retro is perfectly fine when it's done as well as this."

== Track listing ==
All songs written by Wayne Hancock; except where noted

1. "That's What Daddy Wants" – 3:32
2. "87 Southbound" – 3:32
3. "Johnson City" – 5:15
4. "Misery" – 2:30
5. "Little Lisa" – 1:47
6. "Knocked Out Rhythm" – 5:14
7. "Highway 54" – 2:54
8. "Johnny Law" – 4:13
9. "Freight Line Blues" – 2:41
10. "Lea Ann" – 4:06
11. "Life on the Road" – 3:29
12. "Louisiana Blues" – 4:44
13. "Brand New Cadillac" (Vince Taylor) – 4:39

== Personnel ==
- Wayne Hancock – Acoustic guitar and vocals
- Lisa Pankratz – Drums
- Bill Bratcher – Bass
- Ric Ramerez – Bass
- Paul Skelton – Guitar
- Dave Biller – Guitar
- Chris Miller – Steel guitar
- Lloyd Maines – Acoustic guitar
- Bob Stafford – Trombone
- Stan Smith – Clarinet
- Gary Slechta – Trumpet
- Ephrain Owens – Trumpet
- Joel Guzman – Accordion
- Backing vocals – The Tap Room Choir featuring the Skipper, the Big Kahuna, and Slowpitch
