= Fair & Square =

Fair & Square may refer to:

- Fair & Square (John Prine album), 2005
- Fair & Square (Jimmie Dale Gilmore album), 1988
- Fair & Square (TV program), an Israeli reality show and investigative reporting television program
