= The Maines Brothers Band =

Country music band

- Origin: Texas
- Genre: Country
- Years active: 1978–1990
- Label: Mercury
- Past members: Lloyd Maines; Donnie Maines; Kenny Maines; Steve Maines; Zachary (LaTronda) Maines; Jerry Brownlow; Randy Brownlow; Cary Banks; Richard Bowden

The Maines Brothers Band was an American, Texas-based country music band. The Maines brothers, for whom the band was named are Lloyd Maines (steel, rhythm, and electric guitar, vocals), Donnie Maines (percussion, vocals), Kenny Maines (lead vocals, bass guitar, harmonica), and Steve Maines (lead vocals, rhythm guitar). Other members of the band have included Jerry Brownlow, Randy Brownlow, Cary Banks, Richard Bowden, and LaTronda Maines. Terry Allen has collaborated with the band. as well.

The Maines Brothers Band got its start in the mid-1950s with James and Sonny Maines, father and uncle of the Lloyd/Donnie/Kenny/Steve combo that eventually formed the band. The younger group of brothers initially performed as "the Little Maines Brothers Band" before taking over the "Maines Brothers Band" moniker in the mid-1970s. The Maines family lived in and around Lubbock, Texas, and the band was based there. Several albums and tracks are named after the area, including Hub City Moan (1981 album and track) after Lubbock's nickname, the "Hub City"; Rt. 1 Acuff (1980 album) after Acuff, Texas, and Panhandle Dancer (1982 album) after the Texas Panhandle. In the mid-1980s, the band recorded for Mercury/Polygram records and scored a top-20 country hit in 1985 with "Everybody Needs Love on Saturday Night".

In 1993, the band was inducted into the West Texas Walk of Fame, a group that honors and celebrates those individuals or groups who have an affiliation to Lubbock and the West Texas area and have devoted much of their lives to the development of and/or gained recognition in the promotion or production of the arts, music, and entertainment.

The Maines Brothers Band performed a reunion set as an opening act for the Dixie Chicks (whose lead singer Natalie Maines is Lloyd Maines's daughter) at Lubbock's United Spirit Arena on August 6, 2000. They also had reunion concerts at the Lubbock Memorial Civic Center Theatre on April 21, 2007, August 13, 2011, August 24, 2013, and June 25, 2016, and at the Lubbock Memorial Civic Center Exhibit Hall on August 8, 2015.

On December 2, 2022, the band played a concert at the Carol of Lights ceremony at Texas Tech University in celebration of the University's centennial. The event served as the kick-off for a year-long celebration of Texas Tech. The annual event is estimated to have drawn over 20,000 spectators.

In 2023, the segment of Farm to Market Road 40 that runs through Acuff was designated the Maines Brothers Band Highway.

== Discography ==
=== Albums ===
Year	Album	US Country	Label
1978	The Maines Brothers		Texas Soul
1980	Route 1, Acuff		Texas Soul
1981	Hub City Moan		Texas Soul
1981	Amarillo Highway		Country Roads
1982	Panhandle Dancer		Texas Soul
1984	High Rollin'	57	Mercury
1986	The Boys Are Back in Town	59	Mercury
1987	Red, Hot and Blue		Texas Soul
1990	Wind Storm		Texas Soul

=== Singles ===
Year	Single	US Country	Album
1983	"Louisiana Anna"	72	High Rollin'
1984	"You Are a Miracle"	85	High Rollin'
1985	"Everybody Needs Love on Saturday Night"	24	The Boys Are Back in Town
1985	"When My Blue Moon Turns to Gold Again"	84	Single only
1985	"Some of Shelly's Blues"	72	The Boys Are Back in Town
1986	"Danger Zone"	59	The Boys Are Back in Town
