= A-Town Blues =

Studio album by Wayne Hancock
- Released: September 4, 2001
- Genre: Country; country blues
- Length: 42:08
- Label: Bloodshot
- Producer: Lloyd Maines

Wayne Hancock chronology
Wild, Free & Reckless (1999)	A-Town Blues (2001)	The South Austin Sessions (2001)

A-Town Blues is the fourth studio album by the American country musician Wayne Hancock, released in 2001.

== Production ==
The album was recorded at Cedar Creek Studios, in Austin, Texas, and was produced by Lloyd Maines. Hancock intended to make a simpler, less-produced album. The band only minimally rehearsed the songs, and laid down the tracks in 20 hours; the results were mixed in two days. A-Town Blues was made with Hancock's road band. Many of the songs are about travel, highway pilgrimages, and the road.

== Critical reception ==
Professional ratings
Review scores
Source	Rating
AllMusic	4/5 stars
Dayton Daily News	B+

The Austin Chronicle wrote that the album "swings like crazy, there's some top-notch playing, and Hancock certainly knows his way around a country-blues song." The Los Angeles Times thought that "the music is vibrant, as shimmering steel and chattering electric guitars dance over swinging bass lines." The Columbus Dispatch wrote that "Hancock's tunes bring home the bacon with the stylistic accuracy of the old honky-tonk masters."

== Track listing ==
1. "A-Town Blues" – 1:48
2. "Man of the Road" - 2:29
3. "Sands of Time" - 2:53
4. "Miller, Jack & Mad Dog" - 2:06
5. "Track 49" - 2:48
6. "Life's Lonesome Road" - 1:43
7. "Cow Cow Boogie" - 3:54
8. "Route 23" - 2:34
9. "Happy Birthday Julie" - 2:54
10. "California Blues" - 4:05
11. "Every Time" - 3:25
12. "Viper" (Stuff Smith) - 3:10
13. "We Three" - 4:14
14. "Railroad Blues" - 4:05

== Personnel ==
- Dave Biller – guitar
- Wayne Hancock – vocals
- Ricardo Ramírez – bass
- Jeremy Wakefield – steel guitar

== See also ==
- 2001 in music
