= After Awhile =

Studio album by Jimmie Dale Gilmore
- Released: 1991
- Genre: Country music
- Length: 38:33
- Label: Elektra Nonesuch
- Producer: Stephen Bruton

Jimmie Dale Gilmore chronology
| Jimmie Dale Gilmore (1989) | "After Awhile" (1991) | Spinning Around the Sun (1993) |

Professional ratings
Review scores
| Source | Rating |
|---|---|
| AllMusic | 4.5/5 stars |
| Robert Christgau | A− |
| MusicHound Rock: The Essential Album Guide | 5/5 stars |
| The New Rolling Stone Album Guide | 4.5/5 stars |
| Spin Alternative Record Guide | 7/10 |

"After Awhile" is the third album by country music singer-songwriter Jimmie Dale Gilmore. It was released in 1991 as his debut album for Elektra Nonesuch Records.

== Critical reception ==
In The Village Voice's annual Pazz & Jop critics' poll for the year's best albums, "After Awhile" placed at number 13.

The Chicago Tribune's music critic Greg Kot hailed it as one of the year's best albums and wrote in Trouser Press that "it wasn’t until "After Awhile" that Gilmore's unique style became fully apparent. For the first time, the breadth of his writing is on display...For all the high-minded aspirations in the music, Gilmore never turns into a cosmic cowboy; not for nothing is he fond of quoting Ezra Pound's maxim that 'The poem fails when it strays too far from the song and the song fails when it strays too far from the dance.' The music on "After Awhile" embodies that synergy between heart, intellect and groove."

The New Rolling Stone Album Guide praised "After Awhile" for "vaulting [Gilmore] into the ranks of some of the Lone Star state's finest troubadours" while observing that the album "finds Gilmore liberated from the strictures of a dancehall stage, free to serve song over form in the spirit of a folk artist rather than an entertainer."

Mark Deming from AllMusic gave the record a 4.5-star rating, calling it "a subtle, unforced masterpiece that captures Gilmore at the subtle peak of his abilities."

== Track listing ==
All songs written by Jimmie Dale Gilmore unless otherwise indicated.

1. "Tonight I Think I'm Gonna Go Downtown" (Jimmie Dale Gilmore, John Reed) 2:51
2. "My Mind's Got A Mind Of Its Own" (Butch Hancock) 2:30
3. "Treat Me Like A Saturday Night" 3:36
4. "Chase The Wind" 3:07
5. "Go To Sleep Alone" 3:06
6. ""After Awhile"" 3:33
7. "Number 16" 2:46
8. "Don't Be A Stranger To Your Heart" (Jimmie Dale Gilmore, Rick Smith, David Hammond) 3:47
9. "Blue Moon Waltz" 2:52
10. "These Blues" 2:19
11. "Midnight Train" 4:46
12. "Story Of You" 3:02

== Personnel ==
- Jimmie Dale Gilmore - vocals, acoustic guitar
- Stephen Bruton - acoustic, electric and slide guitars, mandolin, harmony vocal on "Don't Be A Stranger To Your Heart"
- Wes Starr - drums, percussion
- Keith Carper - upright bass, electric bass, fretless bass
- James Pennebaker - electric guitar, fiddle, steel guitar, dobro
- Ponty Bone - accordion on "Go To Sleep Alone"
- Richard Bowden - fiddle on "My Mind's Got A Mind Of Its Own," mandolin on "Tonight I Think I'm Gonna Go Downtown"
- Bill Ginn - piano on "After Awhile"
- Paul Glasse - mandolin on "My Mind's Got A Mind Of Its Own"
- Butch Hancock - harmony vocal on "My Mind's Got A Mind Of Its Own"
- Tish Hinojosa - harmony vocal on "Go To Sleep Alone"
- Teddy Roddy - harmonica on "Midnight Train"
- Jesse Taylor - acoustic guitar on "My Mind's Got A Mind Of Its Own" and "Tonight I Think I'm Gonna Go Downtown"
- Steve Williams - acoustic guitar on "Chase The Wind," dobro on "My Mind's Got A Mind Of Its Own"

== Production ==
- Produced By Stephen Bruton
- Associate Producers: Jimmie Dale Gilmore and Dave McNair
- Recorded and mixed by Dave McNair at Austin Recording Studios in Austin, Texas, February and March 1991
- "My Mind's Got A Mind Of Its Own" and "Tonight I Think I'm Gonna Go Downtown" engineered by James Tuttle
