= Fair & Square (Jimmie Dale Gilmore album) =

Studio album by Jimmie Dale Gilmore
- Released: 1988
- Genre: Honky tonk
- Label: HighTone
- Producer: Joe Ely

Jimmie Dale Gilmore chronology
Fair & Square (1988)	Jimmie Dale Gilmore (1989)

Fair & Square is the debut solo album by the American musician Jimmie Dale Gilmore, released in 1988. Gilmore supported the album with several live dates. The first single was "Trying to Get to You".

== Production ==
The album was produced by Joe Ely, who also provided backing vocals. Gilmore was backed by his band, the Continental Drifters. Lloyd Maines contributed on steel guitar. Most of the songs are representative of traditional honky tonk music. "Just a Wave, Not the Water" and "99 Holes" are covers of the Butch Hancock songs. "White Freight Liner Blues" was written by Townes Van Zandt. "Honky Tonk Masquerade" is a cover of the notable Ely song. "Rain Just Falls" was written by Gilmore's guitarist, David Halley. "Singing the Blues" is a version of the popular standard.

== Critical reception ==
Professional ratings
Review scores
Source	Rating
AllMusic	3/5 stars
MusicHound Rock: The Essential Album Guide	3.5/5 stars
Oakland Tribune	3/4 stars
(The New) Rolling Stone Album Guide	3/5 stars
Spin Alternative Record Guide	7/10

Trouser Press deemed the album "a warm, relatively brisk and surprisingly traditional comeback." The St. Louis Post-Dispatch wrote that "Gilmore's high honky-tonk wail of a voice dances lightly over the superb backing of his band." Spin concluded that, "between Ernest Tubb and Hank Snow at their oddball best, you'd probably rather listen to Jimmie Dale."

The Houston Chronicle said that "Gilmore strays across his influences that came together in Lubbock as a teen-ager when West Texas honky-tonk country gave way to the big beat and velocity of this new thing, rock 'n' roll." The Orange County Register determined that Gilmore "can offer a sound that is completely new yet still starkly and inarguably country." The Los Angeles Times concluded that Gilmore's "nasal twang—similar to, but less laconic than Willie Nelson's—is plenty poetic in itself." USA Today listed Fair & Square as the 4th best country album of 1988.

AllMusic noted that "the subtle undercurrents of Gilmore's best material seem to have been left by the wayside, as if a coffeehouse singer/songwriter had been thrown into a dance hall and was trying to avoid getting the hook."

== Track listing ==
No.	Title	Length
1.	"White Freight Liner Blues"
2.	"Honky Tonk Masquerade"
3.	"Fair & Square"
4.	"Don't Look for a Heartache"
5.	"Trying to Get to You"
6.	"Singing the Blues"
7.	"Just a Wave, Not the Water"
8.	"All Grown Up"
9.	"99 Holes"
10.	"Rain Just Falls"
