= Braver Newer World =

Studio album by Jimmie Dale Gilmore
- Released: 1996
- Label: Elektra
- Producer: T Bone Burnett

Jimmie Dale Gilmore chronology
Spinning Around the Sun (1993)	Braver Newer World (1996)	One Endless Night (2000)

Braver Newer World is an album by the American musician Jimmie Dale Gilmore, release in 1996. Gilmore deemed the album's sound "West Texas psychedelic blues-rockabilly".

The album peaked at No. 19 on Billboard's Heatseekers Albums chart. It was nominated for a Grammy Award for "Best Contemporary Folk Album".

== Production ==
Recorded in Los Angeles, the album was produced by T Bone Burnett; Gilmore had started the album with Bones Howe before scrapping the results. The title track was written specifically for the film Kicking and Screaming. "Where Is Love Now" was written by Sam Phillips. "Because of the Wind" was written by Joe Ely; "Black Snake Moan" is a cover of the Blind Lemon Jefferson song.

== Critical reception ==
Professional ratings
Review scores
Source	Rating
AllMusic	4.5/5 stars
The Atlanta Journal-Constitution	3/4 stars
Calgary Herald	5/5 stars
Chicago Tribune	4/4 stars
Robert Christgau	(3-star Honorable Mention)
The Encyclopedia of Popular Music	4/5 stars
The Indianapolis Star	2.5/4 stars
MusicHound Folk: The Essential Album Guide	4/5 stars
(The New) Rolling Stone Album Guide	4/5 stars

The New York Times opined that "the album is slicker and more rock-oriented than Mr. Gilmore's previous albums... In this context, keeping Mr. Gilmore's cosmic sensitivity from becoming too sappy and rock's propulsive drive from becoming too overwhelming is a challenge that Mr. Burnett meets only some of the time." Salon wrote that, "with a precise intelligence, he uses the perfect blend of Americana to bring his songs to life: melodies from country and western, rhythms from swing and rock 'n' roll, fills from folk and bluegrass." The Chicago Tribune deemed the album "a radical departure that risks alienating longtime fans while reinventing and reinvigorating the artist."

Trouser Press noted the "richly atmospheric mix, with a potpourri of percussion, pedal-steel drones, Vox organ, lowing horns and chunky baritone guitar." The Calgary Herald determined that "Gilmore is rooted deep in Texas storytelling, the emptiness of the landscape or someone's heart tempered by a spiritual, personal optimism." Texas Monthly stated that "there are moments when-for the first time ever-he rocks as effortlessly as he rolls." The Indianapolis Star panned the production.

AllMusic wrote that the album finds Gilmore "moving away from the staunch musical traditionalism that characterized his earlier releases, into a brilliant fusion of pure country, mystical explorations, and sonic experimentation that foreshadows the psychedelic tilt of nominally alt-country albums like Wilco's Summer Teeth or the Jayhawks' Smile." MusicHound Folk: The Essential Album Guide likened the album to Magical Mystery Tour, if the Beatles album had "been recorded in Austin, Texas."

== Track listing ==
No.	Title	Length
1.	"Braver Newer World"
2.	"Come Fly Away"
3.	"Borderland"
4.	"Headed for a Fall"
5.	"Long, Long Time"
6.	"Sally"
7.	"There She Goes"
8.	"Where Is Love Now"
9.	"Black Snake Moan"
10.	"Because of the Wind"
11.	"Outside the Lines"
