= Tommy Hancock =

American musician (1929–2020)

Tommy Hancock and The Supernatural Family Band

Thomas O. Hancock (March 25, 1929 – January 1, 2020) was an American musician widely regarded as the godfather of West Texas music.

Hancock was born and raised in Lubbock, Texas, and his grandmother had him classically trained in violin. At age 16, he joined the military and traveled overseas as a paratrooper and military policeman, serving in the Pacific towards the end of World War II. Upon his discharge at the end of the war, he returned to Lubbock, where he led a popular swing band called the Roadside Playboys. The Playboys had various members over time, including performers such as guitarist Sonny Curtis and fiddler Benjamin "Tex" Logan.

In the late 1940s, Hancock hired Charlene Condray as a singer; they went on to marry. Together with five of their children, they toured the Rocky Mountains as "The Supernatural Family Band". Today, three of their children still tour as the "Texana Dames."

In the early 1970s, Hancock was introduced to fellow performer Jimmie Gilmore. They bonded over a desire to seek out new spiritual experiences. Hancock noted that "my whole thing with taking acid was I want to know God. If there's a god, I want to know him. And Jimmie was the first intelligent person I'd ever run into who was searching for God." Hancock played fiddle for Jimmie Dale's band, The Flatlanders.

During the 1970s, Hancock and his family became followers of Guru Maharaj Ji.

In 1980, the Hancock family settled in Austin, Texas.

In March 2000, Tommy was inducted into the Austin Chronicle Music Awards Hall of Fame. In 2002, The Supernatural Family Band was inducted into the Country Music Association of Texas Hall of Fame. In 2012, Tommy was inducted into the West Texas Walk of Fame in Lubbock, TX.

On January 1, 2020, Hancock died at age 90.
