= Ponty Bone =

American accordionist (1939–2018)

- Born: Harry DePonta Bone; October 9, 1939
- Died: July 13, 2018 (aged 78)
- Education: Texas Tech
- Occupation: Musician

Harry DePonta "Ponty" Bone (October 9, 1939 – July 13, 2018) was an American accordionist who led his 1980s band, the Squeezetones, to international popularity over a twenty-year period.

== History ==
Originally from San Antonio, Texas, Bone began studying accordion when he was five years old. Later, he also learned to play trumpet. Ponty attended Texas Tech in Lubbock.

Early in his career Bone was a member of the Joe Ely Band. By the mid-1980s, Ponty Bone had formed his own band, Ponty Bone & the Squeezetones. The group's early style ranged through Russian gypsy dances, reggae-blues, Tex-Mex polkas and Cajun boogie. In 1987, the group made an appearance on the PBS music television program Austin City Limits, as part of a "Squeezebox Special" episode, with Queen Ida and Santiago Jiménez Jr. Longtime Squeezetones bassist Wash Hamilton died in early 2008.

With his band, Ponty has shared the stage with such artists as The Clash, Tom Petty & the Heartbreakers, King Flaco Jiménez, Linda Ronstadt and Ronnie Lane.

Bone's 2001 album Fantasize (on the Loud House label) has been described as drawing from Tex-Mex, rock, blues, R&B, zydeco, and Caribbean music to create a whole new style.

In January 2012, Bone was a featured performer on Larry Monroe's Texas Radio Live show broadcast on KDRP from Guero's Taco Bar on South Congress Street.

== Death ==
Bone died of progressive supranuclear palsy on 13 July 2018. He was 78.
