= Fair & Square (TV program) =

- Created by: Haim Hecht
- Starring: Haim Etgar
- Country of origin: Israel

Production
- Running time: 45 minutes
- Production company: Keshet

Original release
- Network: Channel 12 (Keshet)
- Release: 2003

Fair and Square (Hebrew: יצאת צדיק - "yatzata tzadiq", lit. Turns out you're righteous) is an Israeli reality show and investigative reporting television program that currently airs on Channel 12. It premiered in 2003 on Channel 2.

In every episode, professionals in different areas, such as electricians and mechanics are examined for their reliability. The program uses hidden cameras and an actor who receives the services of the professional being investigated. The host, Haim Etgar monitors the service from a studio, together with an expert in the field of the professional being investigated. The studio expert says whether the professional is acting honestly or whether he is cheating the imaginary client.

Professionals who "came out righteous" are presented an award. The show was hosted by Haim Hecht from seasons 1-6 and has since been hosted by Haim Etgar. The show has seen a number of lawsuits and parodies.

The show's format has been sold to Sweden, Finland, and Denmark.
