= KDRP-LP =

Radio station in Texas, United States

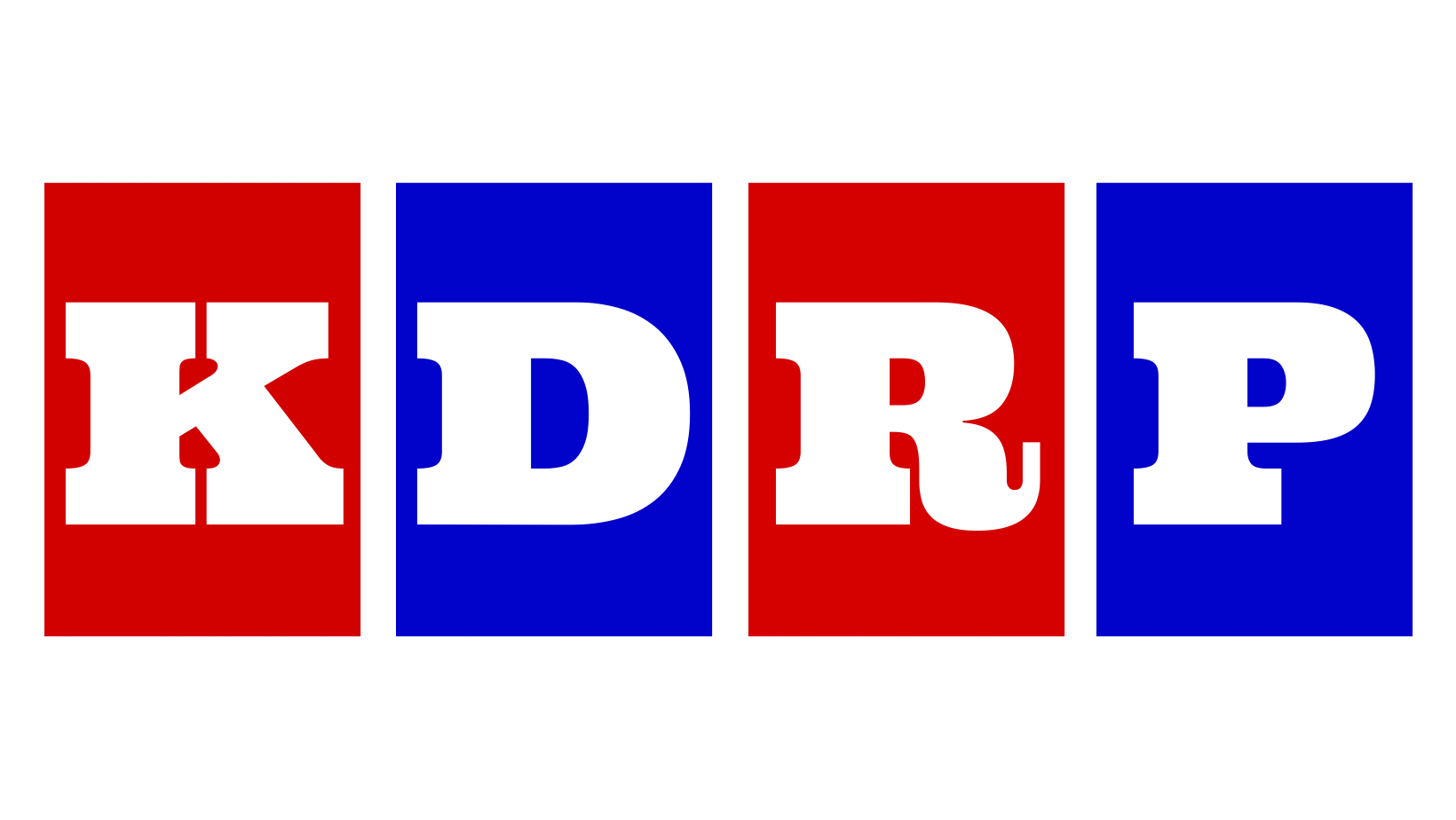
- Dripping Springs, Texas; United States
- Broadcast area: Austin, Texas / Texas Hill Country
- Frequency: 103.1 MHz

Programming
- Format: Adult album alternative/Americana

Ownership
- Owner: Principle Broadcasting Foundation

History
- Call sign meaning: K D R i P ping Springs

Technical information
- Licensing authority: FCC
- Facility ID: 134579
- Class: L1
- ERP: 5 watts
- HAAT: 137.0 meters (449.5 ft)
- Transmitter coordinates: 30°11′26.50″N 98°4′17.20″W

Links
- Public license information: LMS
- Webcast: Listen Live
- Website: http://www.kdrp.org

KDRP-LP (103.1 FM), is a radio station licensed to Dripping Springs, Texas, United States. The station is currently owned by Principle Broadcasting Foundation.

KDRP focuses on Rock and Roll, Blues, R&B, genres of Country such as Honky-Tonk, Western Swing, and Rockabilly.

== Personalities ==
- Kevin Conner – Weekday Mornings 6 am–11 am; "A Hill Country Saturday" 9 am–2 pm
- Mark Murray – Weekdays 3 pm–7 pm
- Ben Bethea – "The Road to Midnight" Tuesdays – Thursdays 9 pm–12 am; "Rollin' Radio" Fridays 9 pm–12 am and Saturdays 5 pm–9 pm
- Mike Buck – "Blue Monday" Mondays 7 pm–9 pm
- Larry Monroe – "Phil Music Archives" Sundays 9 pm-12 am – "Blue Monday Master Tapes" Mondays 9 pm-12 am
- John Dromgoole – "Dance Halls And Last Calls" Wednesdays 8 pm and Sundays 1 pm
- David Arnsberger – "Texas Radio Live" & "Pioneers of Texas Music"
- Jim Swift – "Porch Radio" Thursdays 7 pm–9 pm
- Nancy Holt – Thursdays & Fridays 7 pm–9 pm; Saturdays 2 pm–5 pm
- Ed Miller – "Across The Pond" Sundays at 6 pm

== Sports ==
KDRP broadcast the Dripping Springs Tigers high school sports.
