= Jo Harvey Allen =

American writer, actress, and artist

- Occupations: Actress, artist

Jo Harvey Allen is an American writer, actress, and artist.

== Radio and performance art ==
In the 1960s, she was a pioneer of women in radio hosting Los Angeles' Rawhide & Roses, music and talk show, on the early underground rock station, KPPC-FM in Pasadena, California, produced by her husband, artist/songwriter, Terry Allen. In the 1970s, she was one of the first performance artists performing throughout the U.S. in alternative spaces, cafes, art galleries and museums.

== Film and stage work ==
She is best known, however, for her work in film and for her one-woman plays which she has toured extensively including off-Broadway productions written and performed by Allen of A Moment's Hesitation, (director Allen), As It Is in Texas, (director Ellen Sabastian), and Counter Angel, (director Joan Tewkesbury), (CD of audio available), (play was filmed by Alan Landsbury). Counter Angel was first performed in truck stops and cafes and based on Allen's book of photographs and interviews titled The Beautiful Waitress (unpublished).

Other plays written and performed by Allen include: Hally Lou and Homerun. Allen co-wrote the radio play, Every Three Minutes (National Public Radio) with her son, Bukka Allen. She collaborated with her husband Terry and their sons, Bukka and Bale, on Do You Know what Your Children are Tonight? (Washington Project for the Arts, Washington, DC).

She toured, starred, and co-wrote with Terry Allen and Rinde Eckert the opera, Pioneer (director, Robert Woodruff), (Spoleto, U.S.A.) music by Paul Dresher Ensemble, and starred as, Chippy, in Diaries of a West Texas Hooker co-written with Terry Allen, music co-written by the Allens, Joe Ely, Butch Hancock, and Jo Carol Pierce, (American Music Theater Festival, Philadelphia, Pennsylvania, Lincoln Center, New York) (CD, Hollywood Records, L.A. Times Pick of the Year). Her film credits include True Stories, The Client, Secondhand Lions, The Wendell Baker Story and In the Valley of Elah.

She authored a collection of poetry, Cheek to Cheek (Duckdown Press). Traveling exhibitions (catalogues available) of her photographs and drawings include, The Beautiful Waitress (Bemis Center for Contemporary Arts, Omaha, Nebraska), 100 Artists See Satan, (Cal State-Fullerton) and 100 Artists See God (Independent Curators International).

Allen has been a visiting professor at San Diego State University and visiting artist and lecturer at many universities including The San Francisco Art Institute, UCLA, NYU, The Art Institute of Chicago, University of Texas and The Architectural Institute of London.

Jo Harvey and her husband Terry have two sons and two grandsons and live in Santa Fe, New Mexico and Marfa, Texas.

She was a recipient of grants from The National Endowment for the Arts Fellowships, ART MATTERS.

== Legacy ==
In 2019 she and her husband donated their records including photos and scripts to Texas Tech University to create a living archive.

== Appearances ==
=== Filmography ===
- In the Valley of Elah
- The Wendell Baker Story
- Secondhand Lions
- Screen Door Jesus
- All the Pretty Horses
- Why Is The Dog Howlin' Mama? (Cannes 2001)
- Waking Up In Reno
- True Stories
- Fried Green Tomatoes
- The Client
- Checking Out
- Mi Amigo
- Floundering
- Motorist
- The Outfitters (Sundance 1999)
- Fool's Gold (Sundance 1999)
- Tapeheads
- Killers of the Flower Moon

=== Television appearances ===
- Elysian Fields
- Cold Sassy Tree
- Scattering Dad
- Floating Away
- The Lazarus Man
- Charlie Rose

=== Theater ===
- Ghost Ship Rodez*
- Warboy and the Backboard Blues*
- Homerun*
- An Evening with Terry and Jo Harvey Allen
- Chippy*
- Pioneer*
- The Embrace ...Advance To Fury*
- Duckblind*
- Hally Lou*
- Anti-Rabbit Bleeder/A Biography*
- Do You Know What Your Children Are Tonight?*
- Resurrection
- Juarez
- Leon, Lena & Lenz
- A Moment's Hesitation
- Counter Angel*
- As it is in Texas*

* Denotes, Original Production and National Tour

=== Radio ===
- Rawhide & Roses
- Every Three Minutes
- Dugout
- Reunion
- Bleeder
