= Lubbock Memorial Civic Center =

Convention center in Texas, United States

Coordinates: 33°35′18″N 101°51′4″W

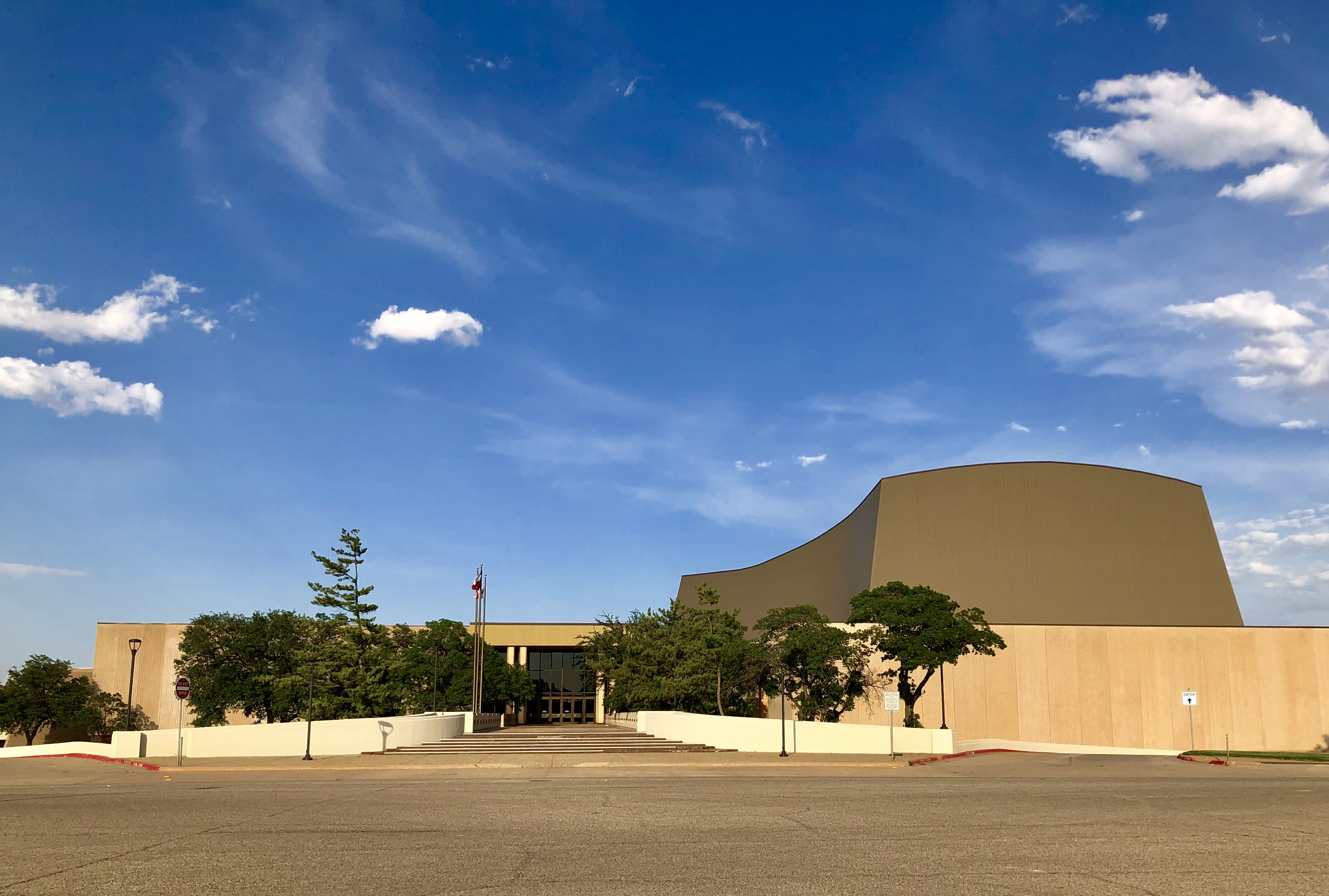
- Interactive map of Lubbock Memorial Civic Center
- Address: 1501 Mac Davis Lane, Lubbock, TX, 79401
- Owner: City of Lubbock
- Seating type: Free standing, bleachers and permanent
- Type: Convention Center
- Acreage: 6.9 acres
- Parking: 1,500 on-site spaces

Construction
- Opened: 1977
- Renovated: 2015
- Cost: $7,800,000 (1970 proposed budget)
- Architect: The Architects Group
- General contractors: Page and Wirtz Construction Co

Website
- ci.lubbock.tx.us/departments/civic-center/

The Lubbock Memorial Civic Center is a convention center located in Lubbock, Texas. It was built in 1977 and dedicated to the memory of local residents who died in the Lubbock tornado of 1970 that struck the site of the center.

Concluding in November 2015, the building underwent extensive renovation work, covering bathrooms, meeting rooms, pedestrian mall areas, lighting, external courtyard and new seating in the building's theater.

== Features ==
Building facilities include:

- A 40,000-square-foot (4,000 m^{2}) exhibit hall which also doubles as a 2,995-seat indoor arena and can be used for sporting events, trade shows, conventions, banquets, and concerts (maximum capacity 4,914). Attached to the exhibit hall is an 11,000-square-foot (1,000 m^{2}) balcony with retractable seating. Its ceiling height is 30 feet from floor to rafters, 45 feet from floor to roof.
- A 14,104-square-foot (1,310 m^{2}) banquet hall, used for banquets and smaller meetings, seating up to 1400 persons.
- A 1,395-seat theater used for concerts, stage shows and other events. It features two concession stands, two box offices, and four dressing rooms, among amenities.
- A 28,000-square-foot (2,600 m^{2}) pedestrian mall marking the main lobby for the complex, and an outdoor plaza.
- A mezzanine room with a 100-foot glass wall.
- Twelve meeting rooms and a terrace suite.
- Ticketing business, Select-a-Seat is located in the facility, and provides ticketing to events in the building and other venues throughout West Texas.

The annual National Cowboy Symposium and Celebration, co-sponsored by the American Cowboy Culture Association, is hosted each year at the Lubbock Civic Center from Thursday through Sunday after Labor Day.
