= Jo Carol Pierce =

American singer-songwriter (1944–2022)

- Pierce photographed by Martha Grenon (1989)

Background information
- Born: July 20, 1944; Wellington, Texas, U.S.
- Origin: Austin, Texas, U.S.
- Died: December 2, 2022 (aged 78) Houston, Texas, U.S.
- Genres: Singer-songwriter folk rock
- Years active: 1980s–2022
- Labels: Monkey Hill Records; Dejadisc

Jo Carol Pierce (July 20, 1944 – December 2, 2022) was an American singer-songwriter, playwright, and screenwriter who lived in Austin, Texas, from 1970. In 1993, Karen Schoemer described Pierce as "an official local hero in her adopted hometown."

== Biography ==
Pierce was born in Wellington, Texas, on July 20, 1944. She grew up in Lubbock, where she attended high school with Joe Ely and Butch Hancock. She became a songwriter in the 1980s in response to encouragement from Ely and David Halley. In 1993, her fellow musician Austinites produced the compilation album Across the Great Divide: Songs of Jo Carol Pierce, consisting of 19 interpretations of her songs. In addition to her albums, she has also written multiple cabaret plays, including In the West and Bad Girls Upset by the Truth, the latter of which is a semi-autobiographical musical comedy. It premiered at SXSW in March 1993 and was later adapted into her first solo album of the same name, which was released in 1996. In 2008, she self-released her second solo album, Dog of Love.

== Reception ==
Don Mcleese of No Depression described the album Bad Girls Upset by the Truth as "Mostly...a hoot, though the profound blasphemy that informs "I Blame God" and "Vaginal Angel" takes religiosity a lot more seriously than does the lip-service Christianity that would condemn it." Robert Christgau gave the same album an A− grade, describing it as "A song cycle about a Lubbock girl who seeks Jesus on the two-lane black-top of carnal knowledge and ultimately enjoys the just desert of giving birth to Her". He also wrote that on the album, Pierce is "aided handsomely by a bunch of musicians who are there for her every time she commits suicide." Greg Kot of the Chicago Tribune gave Bad Girls Upset by the Truth a perfect four out of four stars, describing Pierce as "one of the most gifted songwriters ever to emerge out of Texas" and the album as "triumphant". Jeff McCord of Texas Monthly wrote that on Dog of Love, "Pierce's drawl and off-key singing might be initially jarring, and her loud rock edge is sometimes surprising ('Rock in My Shoe' sounds like a Neil Young song), but her wit shines through."

== Personal life and death ==
Pierce married Jimmie Dale Gilmore, her high school sweetheart, in 1963; they had a child, and subsequently divorced in 1967. Her second marriage lasted for only three weeks, so she has said she does not count it. Her third husband is Guy Juke, to whom she was still married as of 2020.

Pierce died from cancer in Houston, Texas, on December 2, 2022, at the age of 78.

== Discography ==
- Bad Girls Upset by the Truth (Monkey Hill, 1995)
- Dog of Love (self-released, 2008)
