= Larry Monroe (radio personality) =

American radio personality (1942–2014)

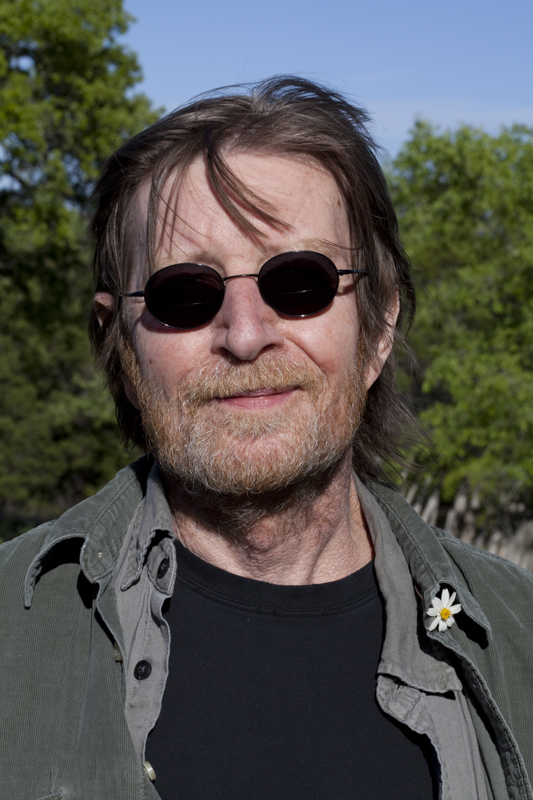
- Monroe in 2009
- Born: August 29, 1942; Hartford City, Indiana, U.S.
- Died: January 17, 2014 (aged 71); Austin, Texas, U.S.
- Resting place: Hartford City Cemetery; Hartford City, Indiana
- Occupation: Radio host
- Website: larrymonroe.com

Larry Lee Monroe (August 29, 1942 – January 17, 2014) was an American radio personality. He hosted popular radio shows on Austin's NPR station KUT (FM) 90.5 from 1981 to 2010, and KDRP (FM) 103.1, Sun Radio, from 2011 to 2014. In January 2014, speaking with a group of noted musicians at Austin's Continental Club, Austin blues guitarist Eve Monsees said "I don’t think that any one person did more for Austin music than Larry Monroe."

== Early life ==
Monroe was born on August 29, 1942, in Hartford City, Indiana, to Lawrence "Slick" Monroe (1915–1991) and Thelma Burchard Monroe (1912–1985). He graduated from Hartford City High School in 1960 and Ball State University in 1967, where he received dual degrees in radio & television and English.

== Radio career ==
Monroe started his career in radio at age 13 while still in high school, where he announced local high school basketball games. After graduating from college he worked at radio stations in San Francisco, Indianapolis, WOIA/WNRZ in Ann Arbor, Michigan, and Detroit's WABX before landing in Austin in 1977, where he worked at KHFI-FM and later at KNOW under the pseudonym, Les Moore.

=== KUT ===
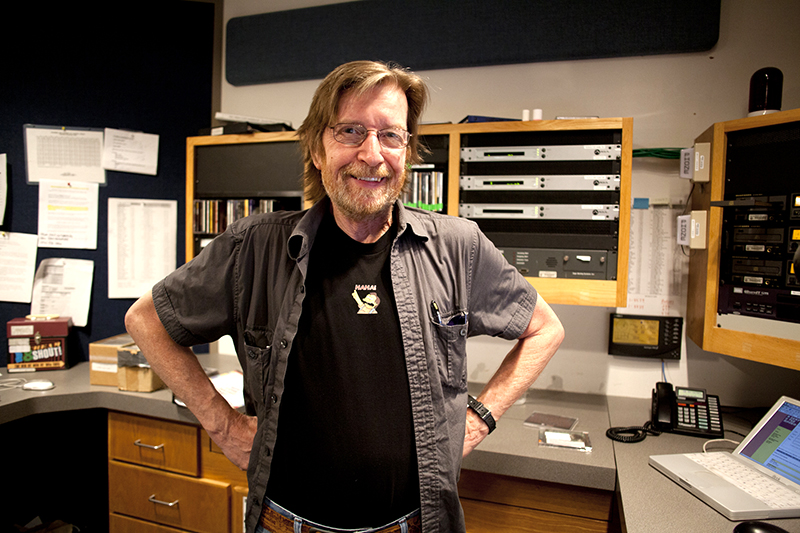
Monroe in KUT control room

In 1981, Monroe was hired at KUT-FM for a five-night-a-week jazz program in which he played a combination of jazz and blues interspersed with comedy. He went on to create and host Texas Radio, Segway City, Blue Monday, and Phil Music. He was a frequent host of KUT's Live Set program. Monroe was well known for his in-depth musical knowledge and clever use of segues that linked songs to create captivating radio sets. He preferred to refer to them as segways, a play on words. He championed Austin singer-songwriters and Austin-produced music in general and felt strongly that DJs should be allowed the freedom to create their own unique programming. In the Summer of 2009 KUT's station management began to exercise more artistic control over Monroe's programs and cut his on-air time. He left the station at the end of August 2010 after 29 years at KUT.

=== Sun Radio ===
In 2011, Monroe was invited to join the staff of KDRP. He accepted the invitation when the station's founder, Daryl O’Neal, assured him that he would have full control over the selection of the music that he played on air. At KDRP, later “Sun Radio”, he brought with him his signature programs Blue Monday and Phil Music and founded Texas Radio Live, a program with live musicians broadcast from the oak garden of a popular restaurant on South Congress Avenue.

=== Blue Monday ===
One Monday night after having had a rough day, Monroe started his jazz program by declaring it “a blue Monday.” He played the bluest side of the jazz library as well as some traditional Blues records. The following Monday a listener called him at the station and said he wanted to get his request in early for Blue Monday so that Larry would be sure to play it. Monroe had no idea what he was talking about and asked, "What?" The caller replied, "Last week the show was Blue Monday, isn't that a regular show?" Monroe though about it for a second and said, "Yes, it is. What did you want to hear?”

=== Phil Music ===
The Phil Music theme was developed in his early days at KUT when the station hosted Austin City Council meetings live. When the Council went into executive session, which sometimes lasted an hour, he would write in his log book ‘fill music” and play music to fill the time. Later, when Phil Music became a regular program, the recurring story was always that DJ Phil Music was missing. Larry would make up an excuse for Phil's absence and announce that he was “Larry Monroe standing in.” It was always Monroe who would “Phil” in.

=== Texas Radio Live ===
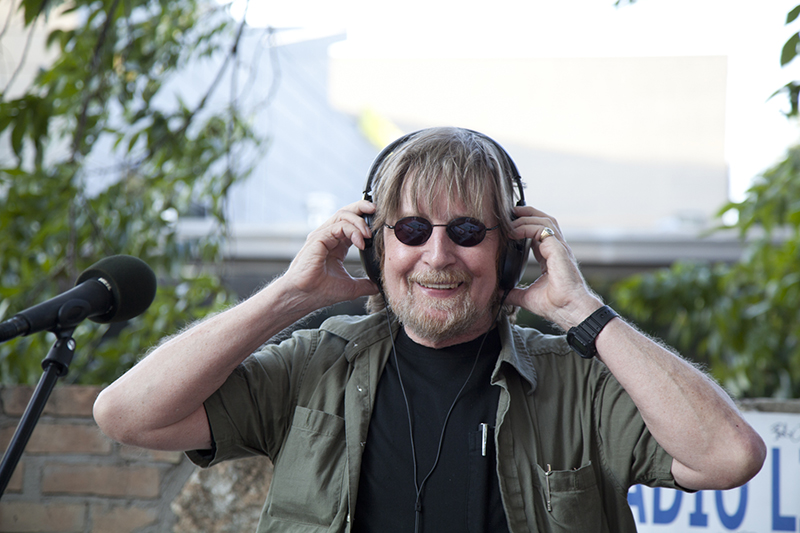
Monroe at Texas Radio Live

When Monroe moved to Austin in 1977, his goal was to put Austin music on the radio in the form of records, live performances, and interviews. Three months after his debut at KUT, he got permission to create Texas Trax, a program that would feature Texas musicians and later become known as Texas Music, a program that fulfilled his goal. One example of how Monroe easily fused a Texas influence into nationally acclaimed music is illustrated by this story: In 1982, a 22-year-old named Casey Monahan (later director of the Texas Music Office) contacted Monroe to ask permission to do a Jimi Hendrix special on his program. Larry welcomed guest DJs, so the answer was yes. Monroe and Monahan continued the specials for many years, always around Hendrix's birthday. If the date fell near Blue Monday, they would play the blue side of Hendrix. If it fell on or near a Texas Radio night, they would play Texas musicians covering Hendrix. If it fell on a Thursday, they would create a thematic Phil Music. When Monroe joined Sun Radio in 2011 he wanted to bring back his Texas Radio program. Sun Radio founder, Daryl O’Neal, responded to this by suggesting they create a live version of it.

== Other professional work ==
=== Townes Van Zandt – Documentary ===
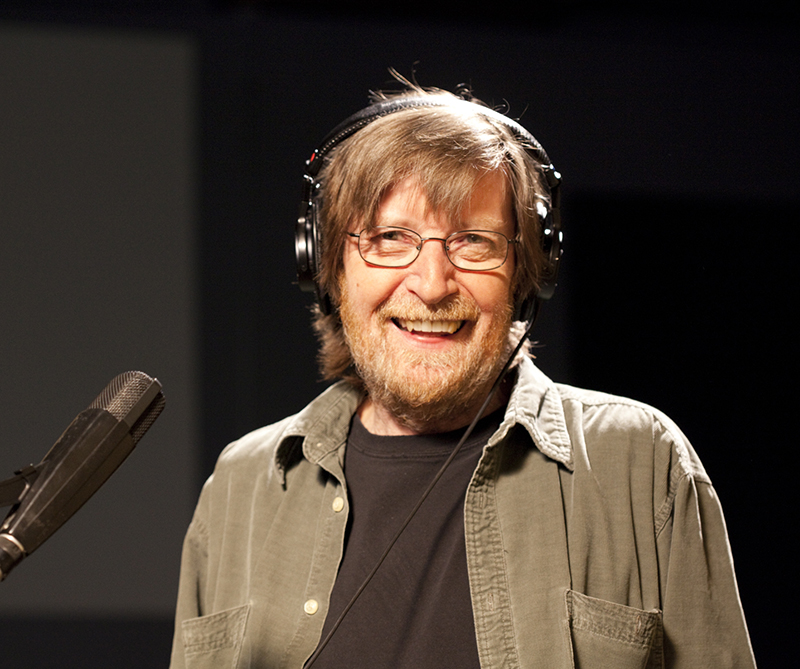
Monroe on the set of Blaze Foley Documentary

In 1992 and 1993, Monroe interviewed poet and singer-songwriter Townes Van Zandt about his life in an extensive series of studio sessions. In those interviews Van Zandt discusses his childhood, education, songwriting techniques, and his relationship with Blaze Foley as well as live recordings of some of Van Zandt's favorite songs. The Townes Van Zandt Documentary album was released as an audio CD and vinyl LP in 1997 under the Normal record label.

=== Blaze Foley Documentary ===
Monroe was the narrator on a feature-length documentary film on the life and music of Blaze Foley, produced and directed by filmmaker Kevin Triplett. The film, released in 2011, was titled: Blaze Foley: Duct Tape Messiah.

== Awards and memorials ==
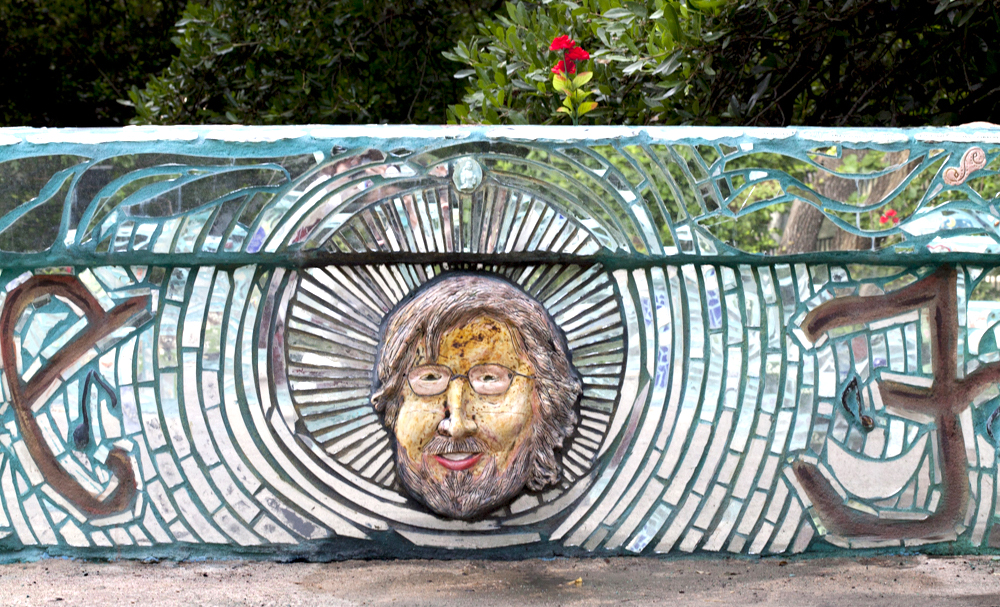
Larry Monroe Forever Bridge

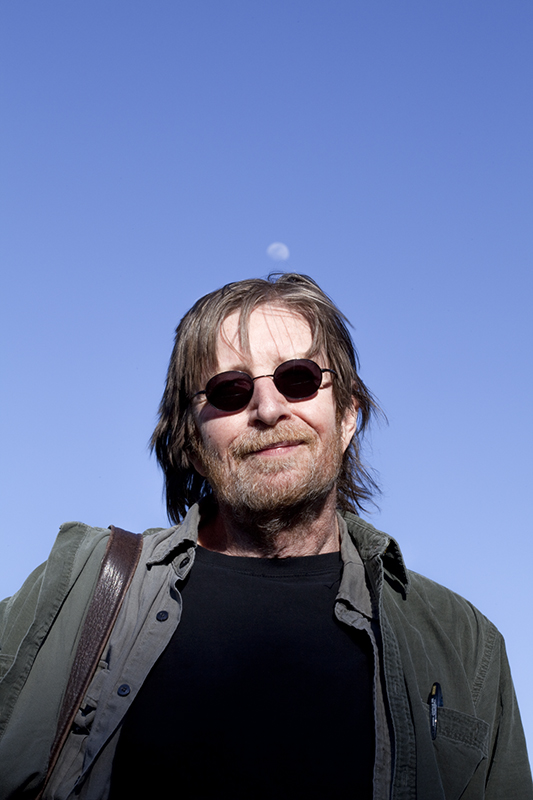
Moonrise over Monroe by Ave Bonar

- In 2002 he received the Keeping the Blues Alive award from The Blues Foundation headquartered in Memphis, Tennessee.
- Readers of The Austin Chronicle voted him Best Radio DJ in 1984 and 1985.
- Larry Monroe was remembered in the Memoriam segment of the 56th Annual Grammy Awards show.
- In 2014, Blue Monday was posthumously awarded “Best Radio Music Program” by Austin Music Awards.
- In June 2015 the mosaic-decorated “Larry Monroe Forever Bridge,” produced by his fans and located at 1506 East Side Drive, Austin, Texas, was dedicated in his honor.
- Monroe was entered into the “Austin Music Hall of Fame" at the 35th Annual Austin Music Awards ceremony, held March 12, 2017 at the Moody Theater.
- His archives, consisting of 40 years of recorded radio programs, are housed at the University of Texas Dolph Briscoe Center for American History.

== Personal life ==
Monroe was never married. He had a late-in-life relationship with Austin photographer Ave Bonar. He maintained a close relationship with a stepdaughter from an earlier relationship. He died from chronic obstructive pulmonary disease – COPD, at St. David's South Austin Hospital, Austin, Texas, on Friday January 17, 2014. Larry Monroe was buried in Hartford City Cemetery, Hartford City, Blackford County, Indiana on January 23, 2014.
