= The Flatlanders =

American country band

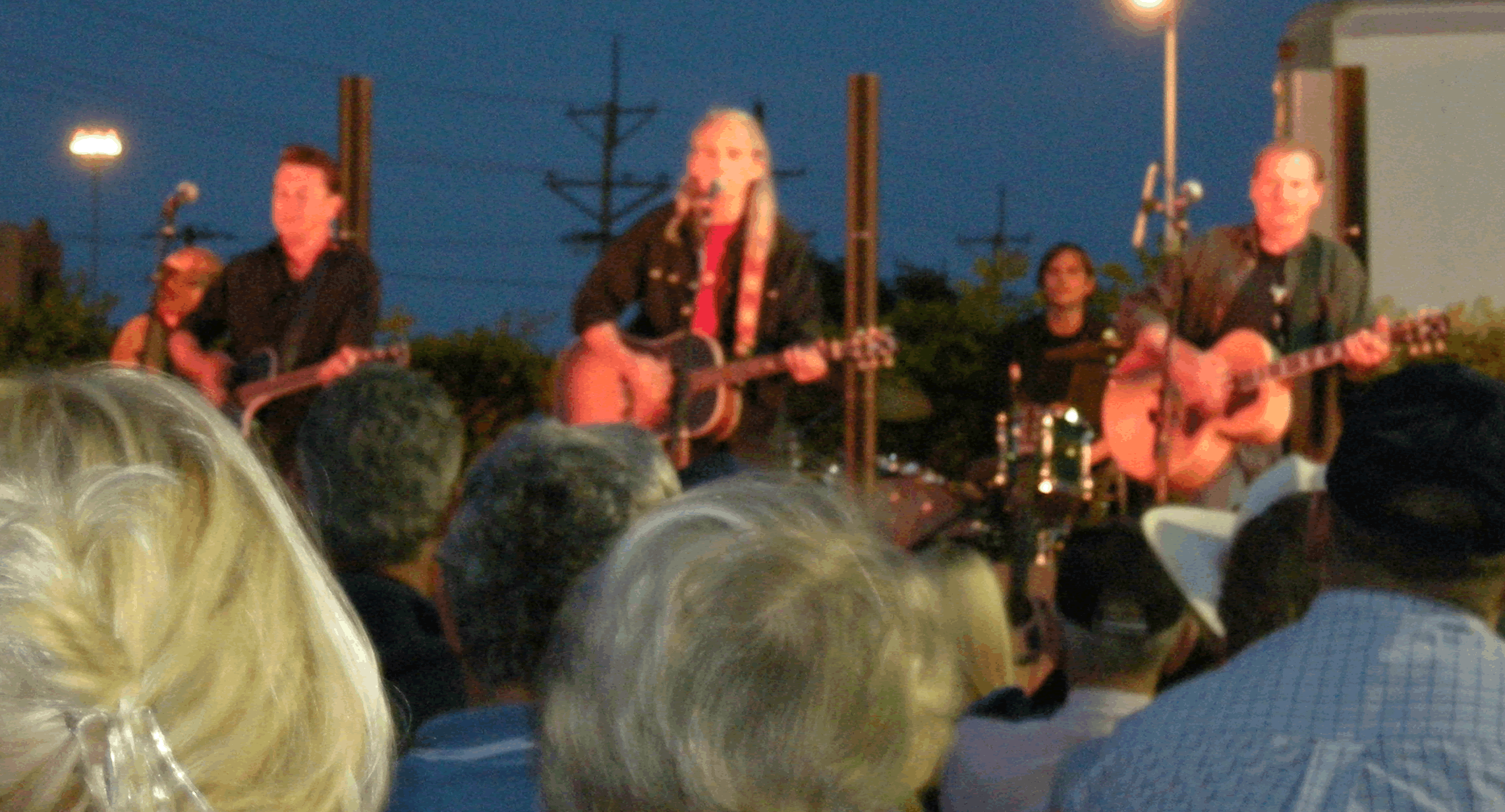
- The Flatlanders playing a concert in Lubbock, Texas, on June 3, 2009

Background information
- Origin: Lubbock, Texas, U.S.
- Genres: Country rock, alternative country
- Years active: 1972–1973, 1998–present
- Labels: Charly, New West, Plantation, Rounder
- Members: Jimmie Dale Gilmore; Butch Hancock
- Past members: Joe Ely

The Flatlanders are an American country band from Lubbock, Texas, founded in 1972 by Jimmie Dale Gilmore, Joe Ely and Butch Hancock. The group garnered little success during their brief original incarnation from 1972 to 1973, but when the individual members found success in their solo careers, interest in The Flatlanders was rekindled with the band reuniting several times since. An earlier incarnation of this band was known as The Double Mountain Fork Of The Brazos River Boys.

== History ==
In 1972, Gilmore, Ely and Hancock formed The Flatlanders with each contributing vocals, guitar, and songwriting skills. Other key musicians were Steve Wesson on autoharp and musical saw, Tony Pearson on mandolin and backup harmony, Tommy Hancock (no relation to Butch Hancock) on fiddle and Syl Rice on string bass.

One of the band's first appearances was at the Kerrville Folk Festival in 1972, where they were named one of the winners of the inaugural Kerrville Folk Festival New Folk Singer/Songwriter Competition.

The band's first recording project was produced in 1972 by Shelby Singleton, the then-owner of Memphis, Tennessee's famed Sun Studios. A promotional single, Gilmore's "Dallas", was a commercial failure, and the planned album, All American Music, was all but scrapped, being released only in a limited run on 8-track tape in order to fulfill contractual obligations.

The Flatlanders performed through 1973 before disbanding. By the end of the decade, however, Gilmore, Ely and Hancock had all found success as solo performers, and rumors of their earlier obscure collaboration began to circulate. In 1990, Rounder Records issued the 1972 sessions as More a Legend Than a Band.

The three musicians continued to reunite for occasional Flatlanders performances. In 1998 they contributed to the soundtrack of The Horse Whisperer, and then in 2002 released their follow-up album, Now Again, on New West Records. In 2004 this was followed with Wheels of Fortune, again on New West. In 2004, New West released Live '72 a live recording of the then-unknown country band performing at the One Knite honky-tonk in Austin, Texas.

In 2009, The Flatlanders released the album, Hills & Valleys. In promotion of the album, the group appeared as musical guests on the Late Show with David Letterman on July 21, 2009, and on Garrison Keillor's A Prairie Home Companion on April 27, 2013.

In 2012, The Flatlanders released The Odessa Tapes, an album composed of unreleased recordings culled from 1972 recording sessions.

The Flatlanders were voted into the Austin Music Awards Hall of Fame in March 2016.

== Discography ==
Title	Details	Peak chart positions			
Title	Details	US Country	US	US Heat	US Indie
All American Music^{[a]}	Release date: 1973; Label: Plantation Records	—	—	—	—
One Road More^{[a]}	Release date: 1980; Label: Charly Records	—	—	—	—
More a Legend Than a Band^{[a]}	Release date: 1990; Label: Rounder Records	—	—	—	—
Unplugged^{[a]}	Release date: 1995; Label: Sun Records	—	—	—	—
Now Again	Release date: May 21, 2002; Label: New West Records	19	168	3	12
Wheels of Fortune	Release date: January 27, 2004; Label: New West Records	35	—	17	17
Live '72	Release date: June 29, 2004; Label: New West Records	—	—	—	—
Hills and Valleys	Release date: March 31, 2009; Label: New West Records	38	—	14	47
The Odessa Tapes	Release date: August 28, 2012; Label: New West Records	48	—	19	—
Treasure of Love	Release date: July 9, 2021; Label: Rack 'Em Records	—	—	—	—
"—" denotes releases that did not chart

a. All four albums feature different combinations of the same set of tracks recorded in 1972.
