= Ark 21 Records =

American record label

- Founded: 1996
- Founder: Miles Copeland III; Stewart Copeland
- Defunct: 2006
- Distributor: Universal Music Group Distribution
- Genre: Alternative rock, pop rock, progressive rock, world
- Country of origin: U.S.
- Location: Sherman Oaks, Los Angeles, California

Ark 21 Records was a record label established by Miles Copeland III and Stewart Copeland in 1996 after Copeland's prior label I.R.S. Records folded. It was based in Sherman Oaks, Los Angeles.

"The name symbolizes the end of an era and a new beginning," explained Miles Copeland, "taking the best of creation into the 21st century."

== Artists ==
- Kathem Al-Saher
- Ragheb Alamah
- Aswad
- The Badlees
- The Beautiful South
- John Berry
- Belinda Carlisle
- Paul Carrack
- Concrete Blonde
- Delinquent Habits
- Farrah
- Faudel
- Hakim
- Wayne Hancock
- Darren Holden
- The Human League
- Waylon Jennings
- Eric Johnson
- Khaled
- Liquid Soul
- Pat MacDonald
- Cheb Mami
- Manu Chao
- Mohamed Mounir
- Alannah Myles
- Neon Steam Dreams
- Ocean Colour Scene
- Pentaphobe
- Porcupine Tree
- Emma Shapplin
- Maia Sharp
- Steve Stevens
- Strontium 90
- Rachid Taha
- Therapy?
- Simon Townshend (Pete Townshend's younger brother)
- Transglobal Underground
