= Lloyd Maines =

American country musician (born 1951)

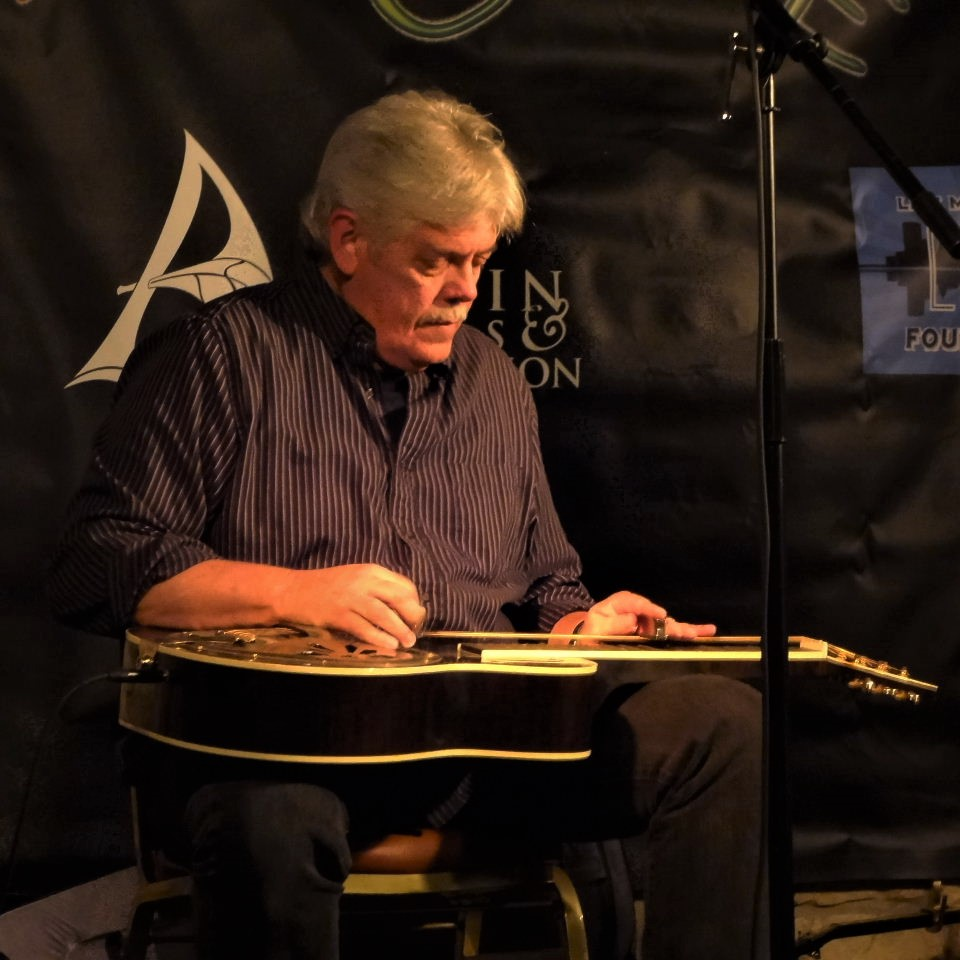
- Lloyd Maines at Acoustical Cafe in Austin, TX (2019).

Background information
- Born: Lloyd Wayne Maines; June 28, 1951 (age 75); Lubbock, Texas, U.S.
- Genres: Country, bluegrass, folk, alt-country
- Occupations: Musician, producer, songwriter
- Instruments: Pedal steel guitar, dobro, guitar, mandolin, banjo
- Years active: 1976-present

Lloyd Wayne Maines (born June 28, 1951) is an American country music record producer, musician and songwriter. He was inducted into the Austin City Limits Hall of Fame as one of the first three members, the other two being Willie Nelson and Stevie Ray Vaughan. He is the father of Natalie Maines who is best known as the lead singer of The Chicks.

== Life and career ==
Maines was born in Lubbock, Texas, grew up there, and is now based in Austin, Texas. Arguably best known as a pedal steel player, Maines is a multi-instrumentalist who has also performed and/or recorded playing dobro, electric and acoustic guitar, mandolin, lap steel guitar, banjo and bell tree. He toured and recorded as a member of the Joe Ely Band and has also played with Jerry Jeff Walker, Guy Clark, Butch Hancock, Terry Allen, Jimmie Dale Gilmore, Golden Bear, and other Texas musicians. Maines was a member of The Maines Brothers Band in the late 1970s and early 1980s and has contributed to alt-country releases, including Uncle Tupelo's Anodyne and Wilco's debut, AM.

Maines began by producing some of his own music. He then branched out beginning with other country artists, starting early on with Terry Allen's seminal 1979 album, Lubbock (On Everything). He has produced and worked on recording projects with numerous artists, including Parker McCollum, The Chicks, Bad Livers, Richard Buckner, Roger Creager, Anna Fermin's Trigger Gospel, Pat Green, Butch Hancock, Wayne Hancock, Terri Hendrix, Rita Hosking, Ray Wylie Hubbard, Intocable, Robert Earl Keen, Lost Gonzo Band, Bob Livingston, Charlie Robison, Owen Temple, Two Tons of Steel, Jerry Jeff Walker, The Waybacks, Dale Watson and Martin Zellar. He frequently tours with Terri Hendrix throughout the United States, and is a major part of her band and production as an artist.

Maines won a Grammy Award for Best Country Album in 2003 as producer of the album Home by The Chicks (formerly known as the Dixie Chicks). As the father of Natalie Maines, lead singer of The Chicks, he was instrumental in bringing the current lineup of bandmates together in 1995, which jump-started their sudden popularity and change in sound. Susan Gibson's "Wide Open Spaces", which had been sent to Maines, proved to be a hit from their debut album, and has remained their signature song. As of 2020, Lloyd Maines, on guitars, has accompanied Hendrix, a singer/songwriter, both live and in recordings since 1997 and her second album.

Maines has twice been inducted into the West Texas Walk of Fame—in 1993 as a member of the Maines Brothers Band and in 2012 in his own name.

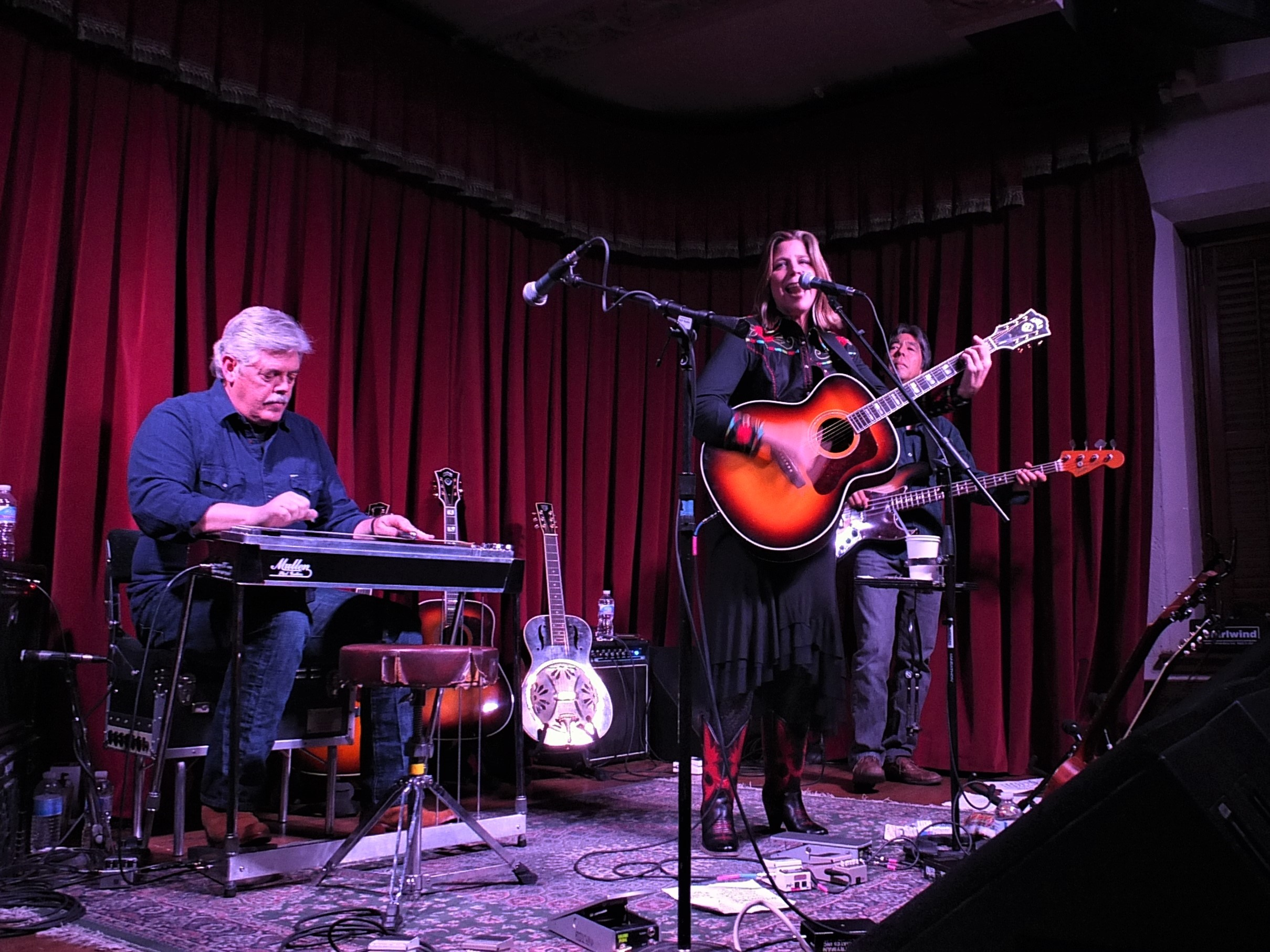
Lloyd Maines with Terri Hendrix at Cactus Cafe in Austin, TX (2013).

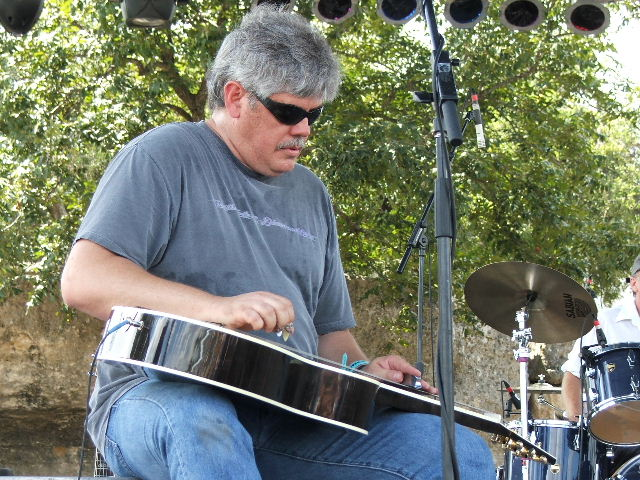
Lloyd Maines at Austin City Limits Music Festival (2006).

== See also ==
- Music of Austin
