= Butch Hancock =

American country singer

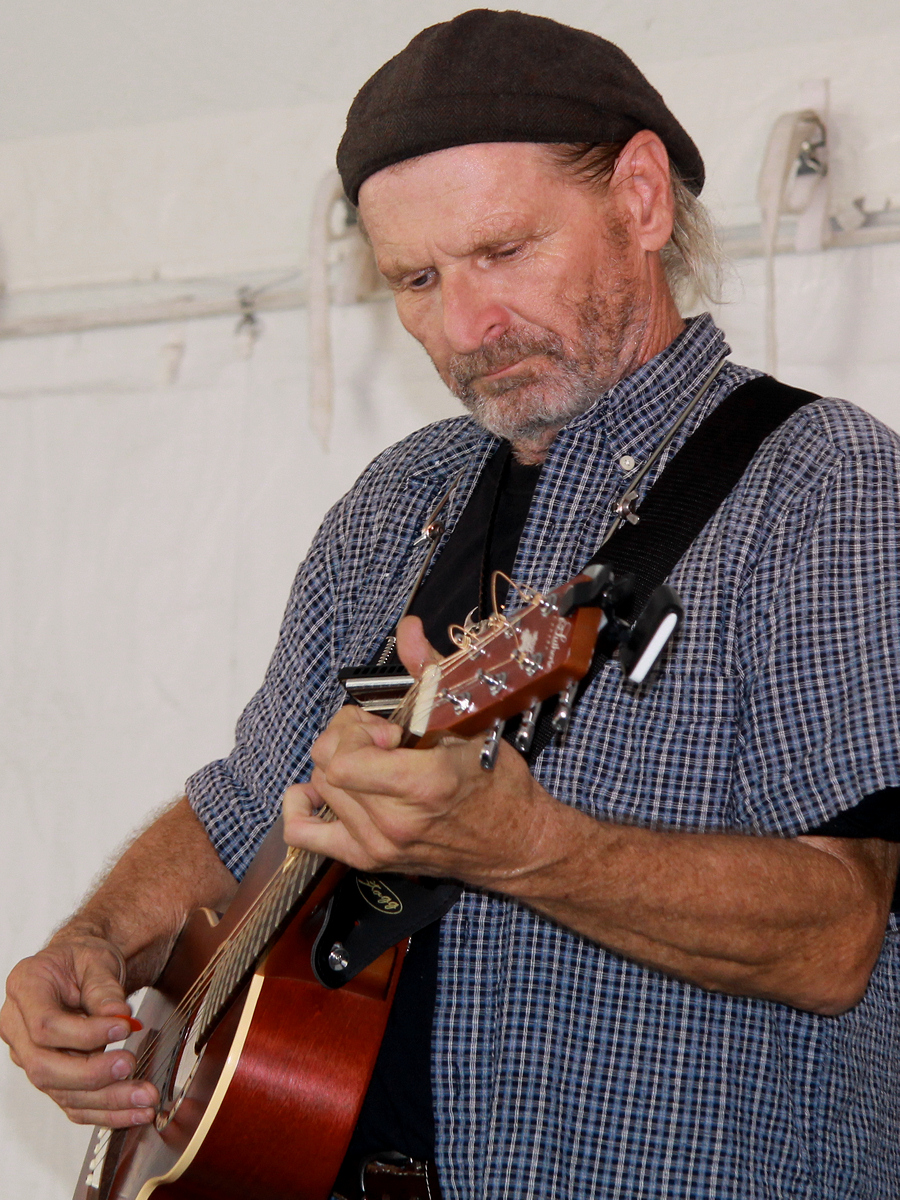
- Hancock performing at the 2011 Texas Book Festival

Background information
- Born: July 12, 1945 (age 80); Lubbock, Texas, U.S.
- Genres: Country, progressive country
- Occupations: Singer, songwriter
- Years active: 1972–present
- Member of: The Flatlanders

Butch Hancock (born July 12, 1945) is an American country recording artist and songwriter. He is a member of The Flatlanders along with Joe Ely and Jimmie Dale Gilmore, but he has principally performed solo.

== Background and career ==
Life in Lubbock, Texas, taught me two things: One is that God loves you and you're going to burn in Hell. The other is that sex is the most awful, filthy thing on Earth and you should save it for someone you love.
-- Butch Hancock

Hancock entered architecture school but dropped out in 1968 and worked for nearly a year driving a tractor on his father's farm in Lubbock, Texas. He recalls that the experience of elemental simplicity and reading books opened up the metaphysical universe for him.

In 1970, he formed The Flatlanders together with his old high school friends. Although critics were positive, the enterprise was not successful and they disbanded the following year. Hancock continued to write songs and in 1978 he founded a recording company, Rainlight Records and released his first solo album, West Texas Waltzes and Dust-Blown Tractor Tunes. He continued to bring out albums with folk tunes, first with only guitar and harmonica and subsequently with expanded use of instruments and arrangements. From the late 1990s he has reappeared with the Flatlanders, with whom he was to release a series of albums in 2004.

Hancock lived in Austin, a place congenial to his progressive country style, for a couple of decades until he moved to the ghosttown region of Terlingua, Texas in the 1990s, preferring more rural environs.

== Music ==
Butch Hancock has been called "one of the finest songwriters of our time" and is acknowledged by his peers as one of the premier Texas singer-songwriters. His lyrics are ingenious, excelling in metaphor and irony and displaying a world-weary trait, just as he is a master of seeing the miracle in the ordinary. His lyric style has often been compared with that of Bob Dylan, and his songs have been sung by the likes of Emmylou Harris.

In addition to the more traditional sounds, Hancock infused eclectic styles in his earlier recordings with artists Alex Coke, Austin Klezmorim's Bill Averbach, Spyder Johnson, John Hagan, the Squeezetones' Ponty Bone, and pianist Marcia Ball.

Hancock has deliberately released and recorded a large portion of his music on his own, preferring to see his music as an end in itself, and spending his energies on other things than a musical career. He is a talented photographer, with a gallery named "Lubbock or Leave it" in the 1980s and 1990s, and currently (Fall 2009) showing his photographs and drawings at Bluebird Gallery in Wimberley, Texas.

Interviews with Butch Hancock, Joe Ely and Jimmie Dale Gilmore along with many others of the so-called Lubbock Mafia appear in the film: Lubbock Lights, which was released in 2005.

The album titles Own & Own and Own The Way Over Here are making use of a play on words, own being a Texan dialectical pronunciation of the word on.

On February 28, 2012, Hancock was the guest musician on Larry Monroe's "Texas Radio Live" show broadcast on KDRP from Guero's Taco Bar.
