= Jimmie Dale Gilmore =

American country singer

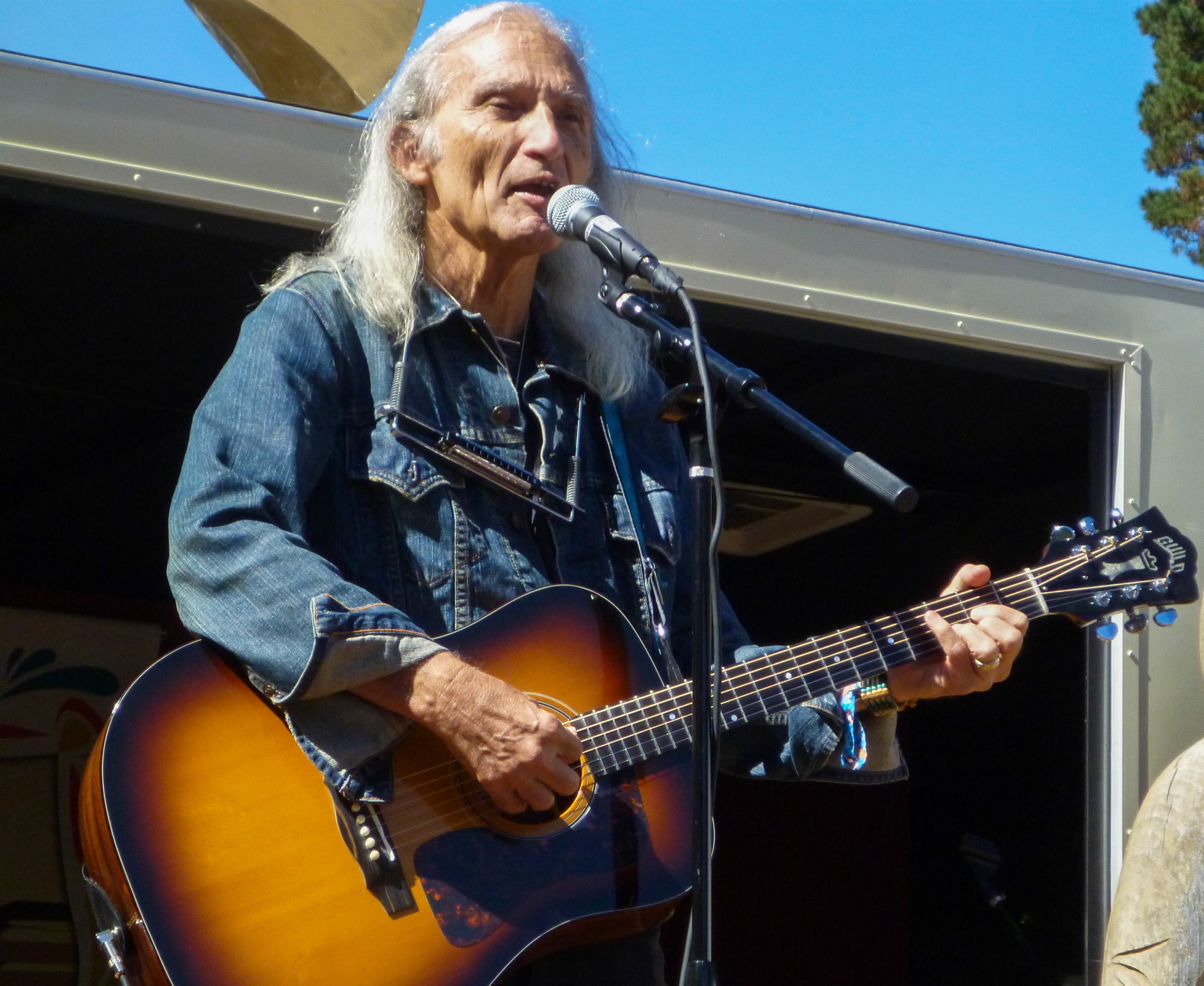
- Gilmore performing at Hardly Strictly Bluegrass in 2014

Background information
- Born: May 6, 1945 (age 81); Amarillo, Texas, U.S.
- Genres: Country, progressive country
- Occupation: Singer-songwriter
- Instruments: Vocals, guitar
- Years active: 1972–present
- Labels: HighTone; Elektra; Rounder; New West
- Website: jimmiegilmore.com

Jimmie Dale Gilmore (born May 6, 1945) is an American country singer-songwriter and actor currently living in Austin, Texas.

== Life and career ==
Gilmore is a native of the Texas Panhandle, having been born in Amarillo and raised in Lubbock, Texas. His earliest musical influence was Hank Williams and the honky tonk brand of country music that his father played. In the 1950s, he was exposed to the emerging rock and roll of other Texans such as Roy Orbison and Lubbock native Buddy Holly, as well as to Johnny Cash and Elvis Presley, the latter two being in the lineup at a concert he attended on October 15, 1955, at Lubbock's Fair Park Coliseum. He was profoundly influenced in the 1960s by The Beatles and Bob Dylan and the folk music and blues revival in that decade.

With Joe Ely and Butch Hancock, Gilmore founded The Flatlanders. The group has been performing on and off since 1972. The band's first recording project, from the early 1970s, was barely distributed. It has since been acknowledged, through Rounder's 1990 reissue (More a Legend Than a Band), as a milestone of progressive, alternative country. The three friends continued to reunite for occasional Flatlanders performances, and in May 2002, released a long-awaited follow-up album, Now Again, on New West Records.

After briefly attending Texas Tech University, Gilmore spent much of the 1970s in an ashram in Denver, Colorado, studying metaphysics with teenaged Indian guru Prem Rawat, also known as Maharaji. In the 1980s, he moved to Austin, where his first solo album, Fair & Square, was released in 1988.

In 1994, Gilmore teamed up with Willie Nelson to contribute "Crazy" to the AIDS benefit album Red Hot + Country produced by the Red Hot Organization.

Gilmore appeared as himself in Peter Bogdanovich's 1993 film The Thing Called Love, a love story about young songwriters in Nashville.

Possibly his most memorable acting role was in the 1998 movie The Big Lebowski, where he portrayed a bowler named Smokey, an aging, emotionally "fragile" pacifist, threatened "on the lanes" with a pistol by Walter Sobchak, "The Dude" Lebowski's best friend and sidekick (John Goodman).

He has been a guest on The Tonight Show with host Jay Leno, on the Late Show with David Letterman, on Late Night with Conan O'Brien, also in Garrison Keillor's A Prairie Home Companion on NPR, and the Fresh Air radio program with Terry Gross.

Gilmore's song "Braver Newer World" is featured in the 1995 Noah Baumbach film Kicking and Screaming. In 2005, Gilmore released Come on Back, an album of songs his father loved. Gilmore said of the album, "This new album is a compilation of recordings of some old songs that my dad loved. I love them too, and it is a project very dear to me." His version of "Mack the Knife" from the album One Endless Night is on the soundtrack of Jacques Audiard's 2009 film, A Prophet (Un Prophète). Gilmore has been nominated for three Grammys, Best Contemporary Folk Album for Spinning Around The Sun in 1993, Best Contemporary Folk Album Braver Newer World in 1996, and Best Traditional Folk Album Come On Back in 2005.

Gilmore's son, Colin Gilmore, is a singer–songwriter based in Austin.

== Filmography ==
Year	Title	Role	Notes
1993	The Thing Called Love	Himself	
1998	The Big Lebowski	Smokey	
2013	Parkland	Reverend Saunders	

== See also ==
- Music of Austin
- Outlaw country
