= Phish concert tours and festivals =

Phish is an American rock band formed in 1983, dissolved in 2004, and reunited in 2009. It is one of the most successful live acts in popular music history, forging a popularity in concert far greater than their album sales, radio airplay, or music video presence would otherwise indicate. Phish, at the peak of their popularity in the mid- to late 1990s, consistently ranked as one of the highest-grossing concert tours in the world.

Known for its improvisational style, rarely playing a song the same way twice, the band has also never played the same set list twice in close to four decades and more than 2,000 shows. Many Phish fans attend multiple nights on a particular tour, much like sports fans buying season tickets, since each concert will be different.

To keep audiences intrigued, Phish records and performs a number of cover songs from various musical genres.

Phish is also known for allowing fans to record the concerts and distribute the recordings. Guitarist Trey Anastasio considered it "free advertising" since it enabled the band's music to be distributed and traded all over the United States and, eventually, the rest of the world.

The band has a Halloween tradition of "Musical Costumes", when Phish performs an entire album by a different band or artist. Occasionally, the band have debuted their own new material during these Halloween performances (2013, 2018, and 2021).

== 1980s ==
=== 1983 ===
Phish formed in the fall of 1983 at the University of Vermont with co-founders Trey Anastasio and Jeff Holdsworth on guitars, Jon Fishman on drums, and Mike Gordon on bass.

Many speculate that the band played at least two shows under the name Blackwood Convention in 1983, but this stated untrue by Anastasio in 2019. At this point, the band only played other artists' material, including Creedence Clearwater Revival, Wilson Pickett, the Who, and the Grateful Dead.

Date (1983)	City	Country	Venue
December 2	Burlington	United States	Harris Millis Cafeteria
December 3	Burlington	United States	Marsh / Austin / Tupper Dormitory

=== 1984 ===
Phish took a brief hiatus during the first part of 1984 after Anastasio was suspended from UVM. The band continued with live performances when Anastasio returned to the university in the fall, at which point they became officially known as Phish. For many concerts, Phish was joined by Marc Daubert on percussion and, on occasion, the Dude of Life on vocals. For years, the band's performance from 1 December 1984, was their earliest live circulated recording, though a recording of a performance at UVM's Slade Hall, from 3 November 1984 eventually surfaced. The band debuted many original songs that fall, including "Makisupa Policeman", "Slave to the Traffic Light", "Camel Walk", "Skippy the Wondermouse", and "Fluffhead." All of these songs, with the exception of "Skippy the Wondermouse" (whose music was later used for "McGrupp and the Watchful Hosemasters"), have remained in the band's live rotation for the duration of their career.

Date (1984)	City	Country	Venue
October 23	Burlington	United States	69 Grant Street
November 3	Burlington	United States	Slade Hall
December 1	Burlington	United States	Nectar's

=== 1985 ===
In the spring of 1985, the band met keyboardist Page McConnell, a student at Goddard College who jammed with the band for a portion of their May 3, 1985 show on the campus of the University of Vermont. By September 26, he was a member of the band.

The band's shows during this period featured much improvisation, much of which revolved around new originals and cover songs from the Grateful Dead. Mike Gordon has often cited the band's November 23 show from Goddard College as a religious experience and the musical highlight of his career.

Trey Anastasio and Jon Fishman traveled to Europe during the summer and wrote a great deal of the band's early material on the trip.

More originals began to make their way into Phish's concert repertoire, including "McGrupp and the Watchful Hosemasters", "Anarchy", "Alumni Blues", "Dear Mrs. Reagan", "Dog Log", "Prep School Hippie" "Dave's Energy Guide", "Letter To Jimmy Page", and the popular classics "Harry Hood", "Run Like an Antelope", "Mike's Song", and "Possum".

Date (1985)	City	Country	Venue
February 1	Burlington	United States	Doolin's
February 15	Burlington	United States	Doolin's
February 22	Burlington	United States	Doolin's
February 25	Burlington	United States	Doolin's
March 2	Burlington	United States	Hunt's
March 4	Burlington	United States	Hunt's
March 8	Burlington	United States	Doolin's
March 16	Burlington	United States	Doolin's
March 29	Burlington	United States	Doolin's
April 6	Burlington	United States	Finbar's
April 19	Burlington	United States	Hunt's
April 21	Plainfield	United States	Goddard College
May 1 (4 Shows)	Burlington	United States	University of Vermont
May 3	Burlington	United States	University of Vermont
May 7	Burlington	United States	Finbar's
May 31	Burlington	United States	Slade Hall
September 27	Burlington	United States	Slade Hall
October 17	Burlington	United States	Finbar's
October 30	Burlington	United States	Hunt's
November 2	Burlington	United States	Slade Hall
November 14	Burlington	United States	Burlington Memorial Auditorium
November 23	Plainfield	United States	Goddard College
December 13	Burlington	United States	The Little Red House

=== 1986 ===
In May 1986, Jeff Holdsworth quit the band; he was not replaced. Holdsworth's retirement solidified the band's classic four-man lineup of Trey Anastasio, Page McConnell, Mike Gordon, and Jon Fishman, which remained unchanged for the rest of their career.

In October, Paul Languedoc officially joined the band as sound engineer. He remained with the band until the breakup in 2004. A luthier by trade, Languedoc built all of the electric guitars that Trey would use throughout his career, as well as a number of bass guitars for Gordon.

Later that month, the band played the first of four consecutive annual Halloween shows at Goddard College.

Phish continued to perform a greater number of concerts in 1986, debuting a wealth of new material throughout the year, including "You Enjoy Myself", "AC/DC Bag", "Golgi Apparatus", "Lushington", "Sanity", "David Bowie", "Wilson", "Icculus", "I Am Hydrogen", "Halley's Comet", and many other future Phish classics.

The band also began circulating The White Tape, their first studio project, consisting of band performances as well as solo recordings by Anastasio and Gordon. While this recording circulated in the fan community for a number of years, it was not officially released until 1998, at which point the album became officially known as Phish.

Date (1986)	City	Country	Venue
February 3	Burlington	United States	Hunt's
February 28	Burlington	United States	Slade Hall
April 1	Burlington	United States	Hunt's
April 15	Burlington	United States	University of Vermont
April 29	Burlington	United States	University of Vermont
May 16	Burlington	United States	Burlington Memorial Auditorium
May 17	Plainfield	United States	Goddard College
May 24	Burlington	United States	Hunt's
June 1	Boston	United States	Boston Harbor
September 3	Burlington	United States	Hunt's
September 10	Burlington	United States	Finbar's
October 12	Plainfield	United States	Haybarn Theater
October 15	Burlington	United States	Hunt's
October 31	Plainfield	United States	Sculpture Room
November 7	Burlington	United States	Marsh Hall Dining Room
November 14	Burlington	United States	Slade Hall
November 18	Burlington	United States	Nectar's
December 6	Shelburne	United States	The Ranch

=== 1987 ===
In 1987, Phish was winding down their college career and preparing to take their live performances to the next level. The band became fixtures at Nectar's during this year, playing three-night-stands, of three sets each night, on an almost monthly basis. Phish continued playing college campuses and parties during this year, and spent the majority of their down-time practicing, and honing their craft.

In the spring of 1987, Trey Anastasio submitted Phish's studio experiment, The Man Who Stepped Into Yesterday, as his senior thesis at Goddard College. Many of these songs would make more frequent appearances in concert throughout the year. While this recording was never officially released, it is commonly traded throughout the community and many of the songs from this project, such as "Wilson", "AC/DC Bag", and "The Lizards", went on to become all-time Phish classics.

A wealth of original songs made their first known appearances in 1987, including "The Divided Sky", "Fee", "The Curtain With", "Harpua", "Flat Fee", "Big Black Furry Creature From Mars", "I Didn't Know", "The Man Who Stepped Into Yesterday", "Fuck Your Face", "Suzy Greenberg", "Dinner and a Movie", "The Sloth", and a quirky tune called "Punch Me in the Eye", which, while completely unrelated and only performed once, served as inspiration for "Punch You in the Eye" debuting two years later.

Date (1987)	City	Country	Venue
January 19	Burlington	United States	Hunt's
January 21	Burlington	United States	Hunt's
February 1	Burlington	United States	Nectar's
February 2	Burlington	United States	Nectar's
February 7	Monkton	United States	Mad Maggie's Farm
February 13	Johnson	United States	Johnson State College
February 21	Burlington	United States	Slade Hall
March 6	Plainfield	United States	Goddard College
March 22	Burlington	United States	Nectar's
March 23	Burlington	United States	Nectar's
April 24	Burlington	United States	Billings Lounge
April 28	Burlington	United States	Nectar's
April 29	Burlington	United States	Nectar's
May 10	Burlington	United States	Nectar's
May 11	Burlington	United States	Nectar's
May 12	Burlington	United States	Nectar's
May 16	Plainfield	United States	Haybarn Theater
May 20	South Burlington	United States	The Ranch
August 9	Burlington	United States	Nectar's
August 10	Burlington	United States	Nectar's
August 21	Hebron	United States	Ian McLean's Farm
August 22	Vergennes	United States	Vergennes Day
August 29	South Burlington	United States	The Ranch
September 2	Burlington	United States	Hunt's
September 3	Burlington	United States	Hunt's
September 4	Plainfield	United States	Goddard College
September 19	Plainfield	United States	Goddard College
September 20	Burlington	United States	Nectar's
September 21	Burlington	United States	Nectar's
September 27	Canton	United States	St. Lawrence University
October 10	Shelburne	United States	The Ranch
October 14	Burlington	United States	Hunt's
October 18	Burlington	United States	Nectar's
October 19	Burlington	United States	Nectar's
October 23	Burlington	United States	Cork's
October 24	Burlington	United States	Cork's
October 31	Plainfield	United States	Sculpture Room
November 18	Burlington	United States	Hunt's
November 19	Burlington	United States	Hunt's
November 21	Burlington	United States	Nectar's
November 22	Burlington	United States	Nectar's
November 23	Burlington	United States	Nectar's

=== 1988 ===
In 1988, Phish began touring outside of the Vermont area, performing concerts in New York, Colorado, Pennsylvania, Massachusetts, and other states throughout the year. In March, the band unveiled the first complete performance of The Man Who Stepped Into Yesterday. After seeing their March 12 concert, manager John Paluska booked Phish for a concert at Amherst College in Massachusetts at The Zoo co-op house at Amherst College. He would manage the band until their 2004 breakup.

Musically, Phish was concentrating on large-scale composition throughout most of 1988 (much of which appeared on their classic double album Junta), with multi-part suites and epics acting as centerpieces of the band's live setlists. Many of these extended pieces, including reworked older songs such as "You Enjoy Myself", "The Divided Sky" and "David Bowie", also featured lengthy improvisational excursions.

The band's original repertoire continued to grow, with complex pieces such as "Esther", "Foam", "The Lizards", "Colonel Forbin's Ascent", and "Fly Famous Mockingbird" making their debut along with future favorites "Tela", "Weekapaug Groove", "No Dogs Allowed", and "Contact."

Date (1988)	City	Country	Venue
January 27	Waitsfield	United States	Gallagher's
February 3	Waitsfield	United States	Gallagher's
February 7	Burlington	United States	Nectar's
February 8	Burlington	United States	Nectar's
February 10	Waitsfield	United States	Gallagher's
February 20	Canton	United States	St. Lawrence University
February 24	Waitsfield	United States	Gallagher's
February 26	Burlington	United States	Living and Learning Center
March 9	Waitsfield	United States	Gallagher's
March 11	Johnson	United States	The Base Lodge
March 12	Burlington	United States	Nectar's
March 20	Burlington	United States	Nectar's
March 21	Burlington	United States	Nectar's
March 22	Burlington	United States	Nectar's
March 31	New York City	United States	Kenny's Castaways
April 2	Amherst	United States	Humphries House
April 6	Waitsfield	United States	Gallagher's
April 17	Burlington	United States	Nectar's
April 18	Burlington	United States	Nectar's
April 19	Burlington	United States	Nectar's
April 22	Burlington	United States	University of Vermont
April 27	Waitsfield	United States	Gallagher's
April 30	Hamilton	United States	Colgate University
May 1	Ithaca	United States	The Haunt
May 2	Ithaca	United States	The Haunt
May 3	Ithaca	United States	The Haunt
May 5	Burlington	United States	Slade Hall
May 8	Norwalk	United States	CD's
May 12	New York City	United States	Kenny's Castaways
May 14	Plainfield	United States	Goddard College
May 15	Hinesburg	United States	Beecher Hill Farm
May 21	Burlington	United States	Nectar's
May 22	Burlington	United States	Nectar's
May 23	Burlington	United States	Nectar's
May 24	Burlington	United States	Nectar's
May 27	Burlington	United States	The Front
June 3	Squam Lake	United States	Squam Lake Steak House
June 4	Squam Lake	United States	Squam Lake Steak House
June 15	Burlington	United States	The Front
June 17	Morrisville	United States	Gopher Broke
June 19	Burlington	United States	Nectar's
June 20	Burlington	United States	Nectar's
June 21	Burlington	United States	Nectar's
June 23	New York City	United States	Tramps
June 24	Burlington	United States	Halverson's
June 27	Cossayuna	United States	Cossayuna Lake
July 7	Burlington	United States	The Front
July 8	Burlington	United States	The Front
July 11	Burlington	United States	Sam's Tavern
July 12	Burlington	United States	Sam's Tavern
Pete's Phabulous Phish Phest
July 23	Burlington	United States	Peter Danforth's House
-
July 24	Burlington	United States	Nectar's
July 25	Burlington	United States	Nectar's
July 28	Telluride	United States	The Roma
July 29	Telluride	United States	The Roma
July 30	Telluride	United States	The Roma
August 3	Telluride	United States	Fly Me to the Moon Saloon
August 4	Telluride	United States	The Roma
August 5	Telluride	United States	The Roma
August 6	Aspen	United States	Aspen Mining Company
August 9	New Hope	United States	John & Peter's
August 11	Burlington	United States	The Front
August 12	Burlington	United States	The Front
August 13	Burlington	United States	The Front
August 17	Waitsfield	United States	Gallagher's
August 18	Burlington	United States	Sam's Tavern
August 21	Burlington	United States	Nectar's
August 22	Burlington	United States	Nectar's
August 24	Burlington	United States	The Border
August 27	Mont Alto	United States	Mont Alto Campus Food Court
August 29	Burlington	United States	Sam's Tavern
August 30	Burlington	United States	Sam's Tavern
September 8	Burlington	United States	The Front
September 9	Burlington	United States	The Front
September 10	Burlington	United States	The Front
September 12	Burlington	United States	Sam's Tavern
September 13	Burlington	United States	Sam's Tavern
September 16	Durham	United States	Nick's Basement
September 22	Binghamton	United States	Campus Pub
September 24	Amherst	United States	Humphries House
October 28	Middlebury	United States	Cafeteria Building
October 29	Plainfield	United States	Sculpture Room
November 3	Boston	United States	Molly's Cafe
November 4	Clinton	United States	Nardis Restaurant
November 5	Clinton	United States	Sigma Phi Fraternity
November 11	Newmarket	United States	Old Stone Church
December 2	Boston	United States	Molly's Cafe
December 9	Northampton	United States	Sheehan's
December 10	Amherst	United States	The Red Barn
December 11	Burlington	United States	The Front
December 12	Burlington	United States	The Front
December 15	Burlington	United States	The Front
December 16	Burlington	United States	University of Vermont Gymnasium
December 17	Newmarket	United States	Old Stone Church

=== 1989 ===
By 1989, Phish was on the road full-time after three of the band's four members had graduated from college (Mike Gordon graduated the following year). The year saw Phish aggressively covering the concert circuit in the Northeast United States, especially on college campuses, where the band found their most dedicated followers. The band's fanbase kept on growing as many fans travelled from state to state and concert to concert, attending multiple nights in a row as Phish continued to change their setlists on a nightly basis.

Phish also unveiled their most ambitious piece to date, the multi-part epic "Reba", as well as other complex and intricately composed songs such as "Split Open and Melt", "Kung", "Bathtub Gin", "The Oh Kee Pa Ceremony", "My Sweet One", "In a Hole", and "The Mango Song." Improvisation seemed to take a backseat to composition for Phish in 1989, a trend that would continue for the next three years. Throughout the year, the band recorded tracks for their fourth studio project Lawn Boy.

Legendary lighting designer Chris Kuroda officially joined Phish on March 30 of the year and would remain with the band through the rest of their career, going on to pioneer new techniques and set new standards in the concert lighting industry.

== 1990s ==
=== 1990 ===
Phish entered the 1990s as a national touring act, performing coast to coast across the United States. The band teamed up with friends Widespread Panic, Blues Traveler, and Aquarium Rescue Unit for various concerts in an effort to spread their music to new audiences, and toured non-stop for the first six months of the year.

Following a three-set tour-closing show at Townshend Family Park (the second of three such annual events), the band visited Wendell Studios, in Boston MA, and recorded a wealth of material. None of these recordings have been officially released but they are available online and feature renditions of several Phish classics that have never otherwise been released on a studio album, including "Harry Hood", "Mike's Song", "I Am Hydrogen", "Weekapaug Groove", "Runaway Jim", and "Suzy Greenberg", as well as a couple of jazz standards, and other original songs.

Aside from a few isolated appearances, Phish did not tour in the summer of 1990 but remained busy, practicing several hours a day and performing a weekly set at a local jazz club, billed as the "Johnny B. Fishman Jazz Ensemble". Featuring the members of Phish, along with what would eventually become known as the Giant Country Horns, the band honed their playing on a number of jazz standards, many of which would become a part of the band's live show for the next few years.

Original songs debuted in 1990 include "Stash", "The Squirming Coil", "Buried Alive", "Bouncing Around the Room", "Magilla", "Destiny Unbound", "Don't Get Me Wrong" (a collaboration with John Popper), "Eliza", "Runaway Jim", "Tweezer", "Cavern", "Horn", "Tube", "The Landlady", "The Asse Festival", "Gumbo", "Llama", and the original arrangement of "Rift."

=== 1991 ===
Like the year before, Phish performed throughout 1991 all over the United States, visiting almost every state in the country. The band's dedicated fanbase continued to grow. With no radio, TV, or mainstream press coverage, this growth was based solely on word of mouth. Fans of the band launched Phish.Net, one of the first Internet websites in popular music. The site connected the band and fans from all over the country and helped spread the word about upcoming concerts, setlists, and band history. It would be a few years before the band started their official website, phish.com, but phish.net remained active throughout the band's career.

Phish made the leap into the big leagues in 1991 when they signed a deal with Elektra Records, after releasing their first two albums independently. They would remain with the label until their 2004 breakup. In the midst of their touring schedule, they found time to record their major-label debut, A Picture of Nectar, at White Crow Studios, in Burlington VT. Released the following year, the album featured versions of concert staples such as "Stash", "Tweezer", and "Chalk Dust Torture", among others.

1991 also saw Phish record an album with longtime associate the Dude of Life, titled Crimes Of the Mind. The Dude, who had previously lent his writing skill to classic Phish songs such as "Suzy Greenberg" and "Fluffhead", wrote the songs on the album and provided vocals while Phish performed the music. The Dude Of Life would occasionally appear on stage with Phish, to perform this material, most notably at Amy's Farm (see below). Upon Phish's surge in popularity, this was released on Elektra Records in 1994.

Summer 1991 featured Phish touring with a horn section for the first and only time in their career. The Giant Country Horns, made up primarily of local Burlington musicians, featured on the majority of Phish's sets during this tour, both utilizing pre-written charts and factoring into the improvisational segments. This horn section, or a variation, would occasionally make one-off appearances with Phish in the years to come, and would eventually serve as the inspiration, and basis, for the horns in Anastasio's solo band.

Phish ended the summer celebrating their 8th anniversary at Larrabee Farm in Auburn, Maine The farm was the site of "First" fan Amy Skelton's horse stable. It was a free show with camping that closed the band's summer tour. The 3-set one day show called "Amy's Farm" is considered a precursor to the band's large, multi-day festivals in future years.

Fall 1991 saw Phish touring with great intensity, from coast to coast and back again, culminating in their third consecutive New Year's Eve show, and the first to run for three sets.

Original song debuts in 1991 included "Guelah Papyrus", "Chalk Dust Torture", "Setting Sail", "Poor Heart", "Brother", "It's Ice", "Sparkle", "All Things Reconsidered", and "Glide."

=== 1992 ===
1992 saw Phish continue to tour intensively, all over the United States, and even enjoy their first taste of Europe. The year's live activity kicked off on 6 March, in Portsmouth NH, with a significant amount of new material. This show also featured the band cluing the audience in on their "secret language", which is a series of musical cues and signals that the band would use to communicate with one another. While this had been happening on stage for a couple of years at this point, new signals were devised to include the audience, such as the Homer Simpson "D'oh!" signal, the "turn turn turn" signal, the "aw fuck!" signal, and several others. A handful of shows early in the tour featured Trey instructing the audience on what to look out for (with the correct assumption that tape trading would effectively spread the word), and those signals featured heavily in the various jams and song intros during this year.

Another bit of audience participation premiered this year in the form of the "Big Ball Jam", where three giant beach balls would be unleashed into the audience. Each of the melodic performers would follow one particular ball and provide musical accompaniment as it would make its journey around the venue, and back towards the stage. While this often resulted in a chaotic, discordant jam, this quickly became a popular fixture of Phish shows and remained a part of their act for a few years, before the venues got to be too big.

Phish ventured to Europe for the first time in June, touring for about two weeks as an opener for Violent Femmes as well as making appearances at the famed Roskilde Festival, and a festival appearance at Brixton Academy.

Returning Stateside, Phish spent the rest of their summer playing their own shows, headlining several dates on the H.O.R.D.E. tour, and spending a couple of months touring as an opening act for Santana.

After taking time off in September and October to record the concept album Rift, Phish embarked on a busy November and December, touring the eastern half of the United States, along with two Canadian dates. After a brief break, Phish reconvened for their first four-night holiday run, culminating in a legendary New Year's show in Boston that was broadcast live on WBCN. Taking advantage of this, Phish heavily utilized their "secret language", including many new signals, which were explained on flyers that were distributed to fans as they entered, the purpose being to confuse any radio listener who is not in the "know".

Original songs debuted in 1992 include "Maze", "My Friend, My Friend", "Mound", "NICU", "Sleeping Monkey", the new arrangement of "Rift", "The Horse", "Silent in the Morning", "Weigh", "Axilla", "Fast Enough for You", "Big Ball Jam", "Faht", "Catapult", "Buffalo Bill", and "Lengthwise."

=== 1993 ===
In February, Phish released their second concept album, Rift, and immediately hit the road for six months of nonstop touring at venues all over the United States. As the year progressed, the venues got larger, especially in the northeast, where they performed at major summer sheds such as Jones Beach, Great Woods, and Darien Lake (all of which the band continues to visit, except Darien lake which was last played in 2011). Phish also visited a large number of college campuses, theatres, a handful of clubs in smaller markets, and headlined a select number of dates on the H.O.R.D.E. tour.

For the first time in their career, Phish did not tour at all in the fall, instead retreating to Los Angeles to record Hoist with producer Paul Fox and a host of special guests.

Phish capped off 1993 with a four-show New Year's run. For these shows, the band performed on a stage that was designed as an aquarium. At the turn of the new year, the band's traditional version of "Auld Lang Syne" segued into the end jam from the yet-to-be-performed "Down With Disease". Footage from this performance, utilizing the stage set, was featured in Mike Gordon's video for "Down With Disease", released the following spring.

With the intention of not road-testing the majority of material for their next album, original song debuts in 1993 were very slim, featuring only "Sample in a Jar", "Lifeboy", "The Wedge", and the short-lived instrumental, "Leprechaun."

==== Box office score data ====
List of box office score data with date, city, venue, attendance, gross
Date (1993)	City	Venue	Attendance	Gross
May 29	Salinas, United States	Laguna Seca Raceway	20,000 / 20,000	$504,082
May 30	Salinas, United States	Laguna Seca Raceway	20,000 / 20,000	$504,082
December 31	Worcester, United States	Centrum in Worcester	14,581 / 14,581	$320,220
TOTAL			34,581 / 34,581 (100%)	$824,302

=== 1994 ===
The band was now a major live touring act, accomplishing such milestones as selling out both Madison Square Garden and Boston Garden, making their national television debut on the Late Show with David Letterman, earning radio play and an MTV music video with the song "Down With Disease" from their album Hoist, and beginning their Halloween "musical costume" tradition (where the band would perform an entire album by a different band). Additionally, the band's audience was growing by huge numbers, making Phish second only to the Grateful Dead with respect to the live concert cultural phenomenon that surrounded both bands.

After performing two of their albums in concert at a show in Charleston, West Virginia on June 26 (The Man Who Stepped Into Yesterday and Hoist), the band jokingly bragged backstage that they could play any album at any time. Taking the idea to the next level, the band promised to play a complete album by another band on Halloween night, taking fan votes by mail. The winning album was the legendary White Album from the Beatles. Several bands would borrow this tradition in years to come, most notably Dream Theater, whose drummer, Mike Portnoy, is an admitted Phish fan.

Several of the year's highlights were compiled to form A Live One, the band's first live album, which would be released the following year.

Phish spent a week in November 1994 touring with the Rev. Jeff Mosier, who gave the band a crash course in traditional bluegrass playing. They would hone their skills on the bus and in band practice, learning several new tunes along the way, and Mosier would join the band onstage each night for a few numbers. After one such show, on 19 November in Bloomington IN, the band and Mosier gave an impromptu performance outside of their tour bus. Recordings of this have circulated in trading circles since the occasion. Home video footage of the entire crash course was edited into a documentary which circulates in the fan community as well.

1994 also featured the first home-video release by Phish. Tracking was filmed and edited by Mike Gordon and features footage of the band in the studio recording Hoist.

Once again, Phish capped off 1994 with a four-show holiday run, culminating in a legendary performance at Boston Garden, which featured the first appearance of the flying hot dog, in which the band rode, as it flew over the heads of the crowd before the stroke of midnight. The hot dog would make two more appearances at Phish events and currently resides in the Rock and Roll Hall of Fame.

Original song debuts in 1994 included "Scent of a Mule", "If I Could", "Wolfman's Brother", "Julius", "Demand", "Dog-Faced Boy", "Guyute", "Axilla (Part 2)", "Simple" and "Down with Disease".

==== Costumes ====
On Halloween 1994, Phish performed the Beatles' White Album. The band played every song on the double album except "Good Night", which was played over the P.A. at the end of the set ("Birthday" was covered as an instrumental, during which Fishman presented a birthday cake to Brad Sands, the band's road manager).

Before the band took the stage for their second set, the sound technician played "Speak to Me" over the PA, leading the audience to believe the band was about to play Pink Floyd's The Dark Side of the Moon. However, just at the moment "Breathe" would have begun, the recording cut to a sample of Ed Sullivan introducing the Beatles from their famous February 9, 1964, appearance on his show. The band promptly leapt into "Back in the U.S.S.R."

Phish returned to the stage after the White Album set, and Anastasio began by playing the opening riff to "Custard Pie", the first track on Physical Graffiti by Led Zeppelin, leading some concert-goers to believe that the band would be donning two musical costumes that evening. However, the riff was only a tease, and Phish played a third set of primarily original songs.

The show included a Halloween costume contest of audience members and Jon Fishman playing on a vacuum cleaner and gracing the stage in the nude during "Revolution 9". The show reportedly ended past 3:30 a.m. on November 1, 1994.

The show has been released in its entirety as Live Phish Volume 13.

===== 1994 warm-up and support shows =====
List of 1994 warm-up and support shows, showing date, city, country, venue
Date (1994)	City	Country	Venue
Radio Performances
April 13	New York City	United States	WNEW Studios
April 26	Atlanta	United States	Purple Dragon Recording Studios
June 18	Chicago	United States	The Loop 97.9 Studios
Late Show with David Letterman
December 30	New York City	United States	Late Show with David Letterman

===== 1994 dates =====
List of 1994 tour dates, showing date, city, country, venue
Date (1994)	City	Country	Venue
Spring 1994
April 4	Burlington	United States	Flynn Theater
April 5	Montreal	Canada	Métropolis
April 6	Toronto	Canada	The Concert Hall
April 8	University Park	United States	Recreational Hall
April 9	Binghamton	United States	Broome County Veterans Memorial Arena
April 10	Amherst	United States	Alumni Arena
April 11	Durham	United States	Snively Arena
April 13	New York City	United States	Beacon Theatre
April 14	New York City	United States	Beacon Theatre
April 15	New York City	United States	Beacon Theatre
April 16	Amherst	United States	William D. Mullins Memorial Center
April 17	Fairfax	United States	Patriot Center
April 18	Newark	United States	Bob Carpenter Center
April 20	Lexington	United States	Virginia Horse Center
April 21	Winston-Salem	United States	Lawrence Joel Veterans Memorial Coliseum
April 22	Columbia	United States	Township Auditorium
April 23	Atlanta	United States	Fox Theatre
April 24	Charlotte	United States	Grady Cole Center
April 25	Knoxville	United States	Knoxville Civic Auditorium
April 28	West Palm Beach	United States	SunFest
April 29	Clearwater	United States	Boatyard Village Pavilion
April 30	Orlando	United States	The Edge Nightclub
May 2	Birmingham	United States	Five Points South Music Hall
May 3	Nashville	United States	Starwood Amphitheatre
May 4	New Orleans	United States	State Palace Theatre
May 6	Houston	United States	Tower Theater
May 7	Dallas	United States	The Bomb Factory
May 8	Bee Cave	United States	The Backyard
May 10	Santa Fe	United States	Paolo Soleri Amphitheater
May 12	Tucson	United States	Buena Vista Theater
May 13	Tempe	United States	Hayden Square Amphitheatre
May 14	San Diego	United States	Montezuma Hall
May 16	Los Angeles	United States	Wiltern Theatre
May 17	Santa Barbara	United States	Arlington Theater
May 19	Eugene	United States	Silva Concert Hall
May 20	Olympia	United States	Campus Recreation Center
May 21	Seattle	United States	Moore Theatre
May 22	Vancouver	Canada	Vogue Theatre
May 23	Portland	United States	Portland Civic Auditorium
May 25	San Francisco	United States	The Warfield
May 26	San Francisco	United States	The Warfield
May 27	San Francisco	United States	The Warfield
May 28	Monterey	United States	Laguna Seca Raceway
May 29	Monterey	United States	Laguna Seca Raceway
Summer 1994
June 9	Salt Lake City	United States	Triad Amphitheater
June 10	Morrison	United States	Red Rocks Amphitheatre
June 11	Morrison	United States	Red Rocks Amphitheatre
June 13	Kansas City	United States	Memorial Hall
June 14	Des Moines	United States	Civic Center of Greater Des Moines
June 16	Minneapolis	United States	State Theatre
June 17	Milwaukee	United States	Eagles Ballroom
June 18	Chicago	United States	UIC Pavilion
June 19	Kalamazoo	United States	State Theatre
June 21	Cincinnati	United States	Cincinnati Music Hall
June 22	Columbus	United States	Veteran Memorial Auditorium
June 23	Pontiac	United States	Phoenix Plaza Amphitheater
June 24	Indianapolis	United States	Murat Theatre
June 25	Cleveland	United States	Nautica Stage
June 26	Charleston	United States	Charleston Municipal Auditorium
June 29	Raleigh	United States	Hardee's Walnut Creek Amphitheatre
June 30	Richmond	United States	Classic Amphitheatre at Strawberry Hill
July 1	Philadelphia	United States	Mann Center for the Performing Arts
July 2	Holmdel	United States	Garden States Arts Center
July 3	Old Orchard Beach	United States	The Ball Park
July 5	Ottawa	Canada	Congress Centre
July 6	Montreal	Canada	Théâtre Saint-Denis
July 8	Mansfield	United States	Great Woods Center for the Performing Arts
July 9	Mansfield	United States	Great Woods Center for the Performing Arts
July 10	Saratoga Springs	United States	Saratoga Performing Arts Center
July 13	Patterson	United States	Big Birch Concert Pavilion
July 14	Canandaigua	United States	Finger Lakes Performing Arts Center
July 15	Wantagh	United States	Jones Beach Amphitheater
July 16	Warren	United States	Summer Stage at Sugarbush
Fall 1994
October 7	Bethlehem	United States	Stabler Arena
October 8	Fairfax	United States	Patriot Center
October 9	Pittsburgh	United States	Palumbo Center
October 10	Louisville	United States	The Louisville Palace
October 12	Memphis	United States	Orpheum Theatre
October 13	Oxford	United States	University of Mississippi
October 14	New Orleans	United States	McAlister Auditorium
October 15	Pelham	United States	Oak Mountain Amphitheatre
October 16	Chattanooga	United States	Soldiers and Sailors Memorial Auditorium
October 18	Nashville	United States	Memorial Gymnasium
October 20	St. Petersburg	United States	Mahaffey Theater
October 21	Sunrise	United States	Sunrise Musical Theater
October 22	Orlando	United States	The Edge Concert Field
October 23	Gainesville	United States	Band Shell
October 25	Atlanta	United States	Atlanta Civic Center
October 26	Boone	United States	Varsity Gymnasium
October 27	Charlottesville	United States	University Hall
October 28	Charleston	United States	Gaillard Auditorium
October 29	Spartanburg	United States	Spartanburg Memorial Auditorium
October 31	Glens Falls	United States	Glens Falls Civic Center
November 2	Bangor	United States	Bangor Auditorium
November 3	Amherst	United States	William D. Mullins Memorial Center
November 4	Syracuse	United States	Onondaga War Memorial Auditorium
November 12	Kent	United States	Memorial Athletic and Convocation Center
November 13	Erie	United States	Warner Theatre
November 14	Grand Rapids	United States	DeVos Place Civic Auditorium
November 16	Ann Arbor	United States	Hill Auditorium
November 17	Trotwood	United States	Hara Arena
November 18	East Lansing	United States	MSU Auditorium
November 19	Bloomington	United States	Indiana University Auditorium
November 20	Madison	United States	Dane County Coliseum
November 22	Columbia	United States	Jesse Auditorium
November 23	St. Louis	United States	Fox Theatre
November 25	Chicago	United States	UIC Pavilion
November 26	Minneapolis	United States	Orpheum Theatre
November 28	Bozeman	United States	Brick Breeden Fieldhouse
November 30	Olympia	United States	Campus Recreation Center
December 1	Salem	United States	Salem Amory
December 2	Davis	United States	Recreation Hall
December 3	San Jose	United States	Event Center Arena
December 4	Chico	United States	Acker Gym
December 6	Santa Barbara	United States	UC Santa Barbara Events Center
December 7	San Diego	United States	Spreckels Theater
December 8	San Diego	United States	Spreckels Theater
December 9	Mesa	United States	Mesa Amphitheatre
December 10	Santa Monica	United States	Santa Monica Civic Auditorium
1994 New Year's Eve Run
December 28	Philadelphia	United States	Philadelphia Convention Hall and Civic Center
December 29	Providence	United States	Providence Civic Center
December 30	New York City	United States	Madison Square Garden
December 31	Boston	United States	Boston Garden

==== Box office score data ====
List of box office score data with date, city, venue, attendance, gross
Date (1994)	City	Venue	Attendance	Gross
December 28	Philadelphia, United States	Philadelphia Convention Hall and Civic Center	10,325 / 10,325	$201,338
December 29	Providence, United States	Providence Civic Center	14,174 / 14,174	$272,532
December 30	New York City, United States	Madison Square Garden	18,977 / 18,977	$426,978
December 31	Boston, United States	Boston Garden	15,135 / 15,135	$355,673
TOTAL			58,611 / 58,611 (100%)	$1,256,521

=== 1995 ===
For the first time since 1987, the band took an extensive vacation for the first four and a half months of the year, finally returning in May for the only politically based concert of their entire career – a Voters for Choice benefit concert conceived by Gloria Steinem. The majority of that show featured debuts of new songs, many of which would remain in the band's rotation for the duration of their career. In spite of that, Phish received mixed reviews for participating in the concert, and never participated in partisan events again.

The band headlined amphitheaters in the summer of 1995 as their first official live album – A Live One – became the first Phish album to receive gold record status. The album, released on June 28 and featuring a number of highlights from the band's 1994 tours, became the group's most successful album to date. The band was now the premier live touring band in the United States, and the group's fall tour featured several sold-out concerts in large arenas.

That fall, Phish challenged its audience to two games of chess. Each show on the tour featured a pair of moves. The band took its turn either at the beginning of or during the first set. The audience was invited to gather at the Greenpeace table during the setbreak to determine its move. Two games were played on the tour. The audience conceded the first game on November 15 in Florida, and the band conceded the second game at its New Year's Eve concert at Madison Square Garden. These were the only two games that were played, which left the final score tied at 1-1.

In their tradition of playing a well-known album by another band for Halloween, Phish contracted a full horn section for their performance of the Who's Quadrophenia in 1995. On New Year's Eve, the band performed what is considered one of their greatest concerts ever – a three-set marathon performance at Madison Square Garden. The show was later released in its entirety in 2005 to commemorate its tenth anniversary. The show was also named one of the greatest concerts of the 1990s by Rolling Stone magazine.

On 25 November, Phish performed their first of many legendary shows at Hampton Coliseum. This show featured the first "rotation jam", where each member of the band would take over for the player on their right, in the midst of an unbroken jam, until the entire band were performing on instruments other than their own. This rotation culminated with all four members performing simultaneously on McConnell's keyboards. While not becoming a concert staple, Phish would occasionally explore the rotation jam in years to come.

Original song debuts included "Spock's Brain", "Theme From the Bottom", "Ha Ha Ha", "Taste", "Free", "Strange Design", "Glide II", "Prince Caspian", "Acoustic Army", "Keyboard Army", "Cars Trucks Buses, and "The Fog That Surrounds", which featured the music from "Taste" with all-new lyrics, written and sung by Fishman. The two versions would eventually be merged into the final version of "Taste".

==== Costumes ====
Although the band performed the Who's Quadrophenia for Halloween 1995, the voting reportedly ended differently. Frank Zappa's album Joe's Garage got the most votes, but the album's complex overdubs, potentially offensive lyrics, and several tunes that Zappa had requested never be performed live again (such as "Watermelon in Easter Hay") caused the band to perform Quadrophenia with a horn section instead (which reportedly came in second in the voting).

Later in the night during the band's third set, "You Enjoy Myself" was performed for over forty minutes. The band ended the night with "My Generation", a song made famous by the Who but not included on their Quadrophenia album. The band destroyed their instruments at the end of the encore, just as the Who did decades before.

The show has been released in its entirety as Live Phish Volume 14.

===== 1995 warm-up and support shows =====
List of 1995 warm-up and support shows, showing date, city, country, venue
Date (1995)	City	Country	Venue
Rehearsal
May 14	Burlington	United States	Jon Fishman's House
Voters for Choice Benefit
May 16	Lowell	United States	Lowell Memorial Auditorium
Late Show with David Letterman
July 13	New York City	United States	Late Show with David Letterman

===== 1995 dates =====
List of 1995 tour dates, showing date, city, country, venue
Date (1995)	City	Country	Venue
Summer 1995
June 7	Boise	United States	Boise State University Pavilion
June 8	Salt Lake City	United States	Delta Center
June 9	Morrison	United States	Red Rocks Amphitheatre
June 10	Morrison	United States	Red Rocks Amphitheatre
June 13	Maryland Heights	United States	Riverport Amphitheater
June 14	Memphis	United States	Mud Island Amphitheatre
June 15	Atlanta	United States	Lakewood Amphitheatre
June 16	Raleigh	United States	Hardee's Walnut Creek Amphitheatre
June 17	Bristow	United States	Nissan Pavilion at Stone Ridge
June 19	Noblesville	United States	Deer Creek Music Center
June 20	Cuyahoga Falls	United States	Blossom Music Center
June 22	Canandaigua	United States	Finger Lakes Performing Arts Center
June 23	Stanhope	United States	Waterloo Village
June 24	Philadelphia	United States	Mann Center for the Performing Arts
June 25	Philadelphia	United States	Mann Center for the Performing Arts
June 26	Saratoga Springs	United States	Saratoga Performing Arts Center
June 28	Wantagh	United States	Jones Beach Amphitheater
June 29	Wantagh	United States	Jones Beach Amphitheater
June 30	Mansfield	United States	Great Woods Center for the Performing Arts
July 1	Mansfield	United States	Great Woods Center for the Performing Arts
July 2	Warren	United States	Summer Stage at Sugarbush
July 3	Warren	United States	Summer Stage at Sugarbush
Fall 1995
September 27	Sacramento	United States	California Exposition Amphitheater
September 28	San Diego	United States	Embarcadero Marina Park South
September 29	Los Angeles	United States	Greek Theatre
September 30	Mountain View	United States	Shoreline Amphitheatre
October 2	Seattle	United States	Seattle Event Center
October 3	Seattle	United States	Seattle Event Center
October 5	Portland	United States	Memorial Coliseum
October 6	Vancouver	Canada	Orpheum
October 7	Spokane	United States	Spokane Opera House
October 8	Missoula	United States	Adams Fieldhouse
October 11	Chandler	United States	Compton Terrace
October 13	Fort Worth	United States	Will Rogers Auditorium
October 14	Austin	United States	Austin Music Hall
October 15	Austin	United States	Austin Music Hall
October 17	New Orleans	United States	State Palace Theatre
October 19	Kansas City	United States	Municipal Auditorium
October 20	Cedar Rapids	United States	Five Seasons Center
October 21	Lincoln	United States	Pershing Auditorium
October 22	Champaign	United States	Assembly Hall
October 24	Madison	United States	Dane County Coliseum
October 25	Saint Paul	United States	Civic Center Arena
October 27	Kalamazoo	United States	Wings Stadium
October 28	Auburn Hills	United States	The Palace of Auburn Hills
October 29	Louisville	United States	Louisville Gardens
October 31	Rosemont	United States	Rosemont Horizon
November 9	Atlanta	United States	Fox Theatre
November 10	Atlanta	United States	Fox Theatre
November 11	Atlanta	United States	Fox Theatre
November 12	Gainesville	United States	O'Connell Center
November 14	Orlando	United States	UCF Arena
November 15	Tampa	United States	USF Sun Dome
November 16	West Palm Beach	United States	West Palm Beach Auditorium
November 18	North Charleston	United States	North Charleston Coliseum
November 19	Charlotte	United States	Charlotte Coliseum
November 21	Winston-Salem	United States	Lawrence Joel Veterans Memorial Coliseum
November 22	Landover	United States	USAir Arena
November 24	Pittsburgh	United States	Civic Arena
November 25	Hampton	United States	Hampton Coliseum
November 28	Knoxville	United States	Knoxville Civic Coliseum
November 29	Nashville	United States	Nashville Municipal Auditorium
November 30	Fairborn	United States	Ervin J. Nutter Center
December 1	Hershey	United States	Hersheypark Arena
December 2	New Haven	United States	New Haven Veterans Memorial Coliseum
December 4	Amherst	United States	William D. Mullins Memorial Center
December 5	Amherst	United States	William D. Mullins Memorial Center
December 7	Niagara Falls	United States	Niagara Falls Convention and Civic Center
December 8	Cleveland	United States	CSU Convocation Center
December 9	Albany	United States	Knickerbocker Arena
December 11	Portland	United States	Cumberland County Civic Center
December 12	Providence	United States	Providence Civic Center
December 14	Binghamton	United States	Broome County Veterans Memorial Arena
December 15	Philadelphia	United States	CoreStates Spectrum
December 16	Lake Placid	United States	Olympic Center Ice Rink
December 17	Lake Placid	United States	Olympic Center Ice Rink
1995 New Year's Eve Run
December 28	Worcester	United States	Centrum in Worcester
December 29	Worcester	United States	Centrum in Worcester
December 30	New York City	United States	Madison Square Garden
December 31	New York City	United States	Madison Square Garden

==== Box office score data ====
List of box office score data with date, city, venue, attendance, gross
Date (1995)	City	Venue	Attendance	Gross
June 23	Stanhope, United States	Waterloo Village	16,643 / 16,643	$377,400
June 28	Wantagh, United States	Jones Beach Amphitheater	22,110 / 22,110	$487,475
June 29	Wantagh, United States	Jones Beach Amphitheater	22,110 / 22,110	$487,475
October 31	Rosemont, United States	Rosemont Horizon	18,311 / 18,311	$411,998
November 9	Atlanta, United States	Fox Theatre	13,547 / 13,547	$304,808
November 10	Atlanta, United States	Fox Theatre	13,547 / 13,547	$304,808
November 11	Atlanta, United States	Fox Theatre	13,547 / 13,547	$304,808
November 24	Pittsburgh, United States	Civic Arena	10,669 / 18,742	$213,380
November 25	Hampton, United States	Hampton Coliseum	12,903 / 12,903	$260,976
December 4	Amherst, United States	William D. Mullins Memorial Center	21,018 / 21,018	$420,360
December 5	Amherst, United States	William D. Mullins Memorial Center	21,018 / 21,018	$420,360
December 15	Philadelphia, United States	CoreStates Spectrum	18,220 / 18,220	$412,200
December 28	Worcester, United States	Centrum in Worcester	28,924 / 28,924	$679,714
December 29	Worcester, United States	Centrum in Worcester	28,924 / 28,924	$679,714
December 30	New York City, United States	Madison Square Garden	36,504 / 36,504	$1,004,275
December 31	New York City, United States	Madison Square Garden	36,504 / 36,504	$1,004,275
TOTAL			198,849 / 206,922 (96%)	$4,572,586

=== 1996 ===
While taking the first half of 1996 off to begin recording a new studio album, Phish made two one-off live appearances in the spring. First was the band headlining at the 1996 New Orleans Jazz and Heritage Festival in April. The second was a surprise club appearance under the name "Third Ball" at a small club in Woodstock, New York, just miles from Bearsville Studios, where Phish was finishing their new album.

That summer, the band once again toured Europe with Santana for the first time in four years. These dates would be the last time Phish toured with another act on the bill. By August, the band was finally back in the US for a brief summer tour that saw most of the shows sold out well in advance. The band also began performing multiple nights at certain venues, such as Indiana's Deer Creek Music Center (where Phish's August 13 show was released as Live Phish 12) and Colorado's Red Rocks Amphitheatre. Phish's audience had grown so much that the enormous influx of Phish fans to the town of Morrison, Colorado, resulted in Phish being banned for 10 years from playing Red Rocks.

Phish was so popular that the band drew 70,000 to a decommissioned air force base in remote Plattsburgh, New York for a two-day Phish festival called The Clifford Ball. It was the largest rock concert of the year. Phish played seven sets over two days, one of which featured a jam atop a flatbed truck cruising through the campground in the middle of the night. The second day featured a symphony orchestra performing classical music in the mid-afternoon. MTV made a documentary of the experience. The Clifford Ball was the first weekend-long festival hosted by Phish throughout their career. The event took place on August 16 and 17, 1996, at the former Plattsburgh Air Force Base in Plattsburgh, New York, about one hour west from Phish's home base of Burlington, Vermont. The event was named after Clifford Ball, a man who held events for aviators such as Amelia Earhart. The Clifford Ball was a proposed name for the 1990s traveling festival that ultimately was named H.O.R.D.E.

The name Clifford Ball had been known to the band for some five years before The Clifford Ball took place. According to Phish Manager, John Paluska, "The band was walking through the airport in Pittsburgh one day, and they came upon a small, little plaque of a guy named Clifford Ball... it said 'Clifford Ball: a beacon of light in the world of flight.' ...they just thought the [expression] was the funniest idea for a show..."

The event combined overhead flights by bombers, fighters, gliders, and various other aerial vehicles with carnival rides, jugglers, and men on stilts. Three gigantic video screens and four sound towers were erected to amplify the band. Phish, the marquee band who headlined the event, were joined by a classical violin quartet, a blues quartet, a choral quintet, and guitar soloists. The "Clifford Ball Orchestra" performed an afternoon set of pieces by Debussy, Ravel, and Stravinsky. Phish performed seven sets of music over the two nights, including a late-night set on a flatbed truck that rolled through the parking lot.

70,000 people attended, making the event Phish's largest concert up to that point and the largest rock concert in the United States in that year. The audience was four times the size of surrounding city of Plattsburgh, making Plattsburgh the ninth most-populous city in New York that weekend, and adding $20 million to the local economy. Despite the size of the concert, it received very little coverage from the mainstream media. MTV aired a documentary of the experience, using footage from Phish's production company, Dionysian Productions. Phish released a seven-DVD box set on March 3, 2009, chronicling the band's seven sets and including bonus documentary footage.

In October, the band released their long-awaited, commercially successful studio album Billy Breathes. That fall, the band headlined major arenas and covered Remain in Light by Talking Heads at their 1996 Halloween show at The Omni in Atlanta. The performance of the groove-based album, which was influenced by funk and African polyrhythms, was cited by band members as a major influence on the group's stylistic change in 1997 and beyond.

Original song debuts included "Waste", "Character Zero", "Train Song", "Talk", "Swept Away", and "Steep".

==== Costumes ====
For their third musical costume, Phish's rendition of Talking Heads' Remain in Light lasted 62 minutes and 16 seconds (compared to Talking Heads's original, at under 45 minutes; elsewhere reported as 54:12), and featured a horn section and Santana percussionist Karl Perazzo.

The show has been released in its entirety as Live Phish Volume 15.

===== 1996 warm-up and support shows =====
List of 1996 warm-up and support shows, showing date, city, country, venue
Date (1996)	City	Country	Venue
New Orleans Jazz & Heritage Festival
April 26	New Orleans	United States	New Orleans Jazz & Heritage Festival
Secret Show
June 6	Woodstock	United States	Joyous Lake
Opening for Santana
July 3	Trento	Italy	Stadio Briamasco
July 5	Rome	Italy	Stadio Olimpico
July 6	Pistoia	Italy	Piazza del Duomo
July 7	Milan	Italy	Parco Aquaitca
July 9	Deauville	France	Centre International
July 10	Paris	France	Zénith de Paris
July 17	Vienne	France	Theatre Antique
July 18	Nice	France	Nice Jazz Festival
July 19	Arles	France	Les Arénes Romaines
July 22	Cologne	Germany	Tanzbrunnen
July 24	Hanover	Germany	The Music Hall
July 25	Hamburg	Germany	Stadtpark
Los Angeles Lakers game
December 5	Inglewood	United States	Great Western Forum

===== 1996 dates =====
List of 1996 tour dates, showing date, city, country, venue
Date (1996)	City	Country	Venue
Europe Summer 1996
July 11	London	England	Shepherd's Bush Empire
July 12	Amsterdam	Netherlands	Melkweg
July 13	Dour	Belgium	Dour Festival
July 15	Sesto Calende	Italy	La Marna
July 21	Nuremberg	Germany	The Forum
July 23	Hamburg	Germany	Markthalle Hamburg
U.S. Summer 1996
August 2	Park City	United States	Wolf Mountain Amphitheatre
August 4	Morrison	United States	Red Rocks Amphitheatre
August 5	Morrison	United States	Red Rocks Amphitheatre
August 6	Morrison	United States	Red Rocks Amphitheatre
August 7	Morrison	United States	Red Rocks Amphitheatre
August 10	East Troy	United States	Alpine Valley Music Theatre
August 12	Noblesville	United States	Deer Creek Music Center
August 13	Noblesville	United States	Deer Creek Music Center
August 14	Hershey	United States	Hersheypark Stadium
The Clifford Ball
August 16	Plattsburgh	United States	Plattsburgh Air Force Base
August 17	Plattsburgh	United States	Plattsburgh Air Force Base
North America Fall 1996
October 16	Lake Placid	United States	Olympic Center Ice Rink
October 17	University Park	United States	Bryce Jordan Center
October 18	Pittsburgh	United States	Civic Arena
October 19	Buffalo	United States	Marine Midland Arena
October 21	New York City	United States	Madison Square Garden
October 22	New York City	United States	Madison Square Garden
October 23	Hartford	United States	Hartford Civic Center
October 25	Hampton	United States	Hampton Coliseum
October 26	Charlotte	United States	Charlotte Coliseum
October 27	North Charleston	United States	North Charleston Coliseum
October 29	Tallahassee	United States	Leon County Civic Center
October 31	Atlanta	United States	Omni Coliseum
November 2	West Palm Beach	United States	Coral Sky Amphitheater
November 3	Gainesville	United States	O'Connell Center
November 6	Knoxville	United States	Knoxville Civic Coliseum
November 7	Lexington	United States	Rupp Arena
November 8	Champaign	United States	Assembly Hall
November 9	Auburn Hills	United States	The Palace of Auburn Hills
November 11	Grand Rapids	United States	Van Andel Arena
November 13	Minneapolis	United States	Target Center
November 14	Ames	United States	Hilton Coliseum
November 15	St. Louis	United States	Kiel Center
November 16	Omaha	United States	Omaha Civic Auditorium
November 18	Memphis	United States	Mid-South Coliseum
November 19	Kansas City	United States	Municipal Auditorium
November 22	Spokane	United States	Spokane Veterans Memorial Arena
November 23	Vancouver	Canada	Pacific Coliseum
November 24	Portland	United States	Veterans Memorial Coliseum
November 27	Seattle	United States	KeyArena
November 29	Daly City	United States	Cow Palace
November 30	Sacramento	United States	ARCO Arena
December 1	Los Angeles	United States	Pauley Pavilion
December 2	Phoenix	United States	America West Arena
December 4	San Diego	United States	San Diego Sports Arena
December 6	Las Vegas	United States	Aladdin Theatre for the Performing Arts
1996 New Year's Eve Run
December 28	Philadelphia	United States	CoreStates Spectrum
December 29	Philadelphia	United States	CoreStates Spectrum
December 30	Boston	United States	FleetCenter
December 31	Boston	United States	FleetCenter

==== Box office score data ====
List of box office score data with date, city, venue, attendance, gross
Date (1996)	City	Venue	Attendance	Gross
August 4	Morrison, United States	Red Rocks Amphitheatre	36,962 / 36,962	$924,050
August 5	Morrison, United States	Red Rocks Amphitheatre	36,962 / 36,962	$924,050
August 6	Morrison, United States	Red Rocks Amphitheatre	36,962 / 36,962	$924,050
August 7	Morrison, United States	Red Rocks Amphitheatre	36,962 / 36,962	$924,050
August 12	Noblesville, United States	Deer Creek Music Center	42,158 / 42,158	$851,865
August 13	Noblesville, United States	Deer Creek Music Center	42,158 / 42,158	$851,865
August 14	Hershey, United States	Hersheypark Stadium	25,100 / 25,100	$619,100
August 16	Plattsburgh, United States	Plattsburgh Air Force Base	135,267 / 135,267	$3,310,245
August 17	Plattsburgh, United States	Plattsburgh Air Force Base	135,267 / 135,267	$3,310,245
October 21	New York City, United States	Madison Square Garden	34,204 / 34,204	$857,744
October 22	New York City, United States	Madison Square Garden	34,204 / 34,204	$857,744
October 26	Charlotte, United States	Charlotte Coliseum	17,580 / 17,580	$391,996
November 9	Auburn Hills, United States	The Palace of Auburn Hills	18,359 / 18,359	$414,770
November 15	St. Louis, United States	Kiel Center	14,492 / 18,000	$286,374
December 28	Philadelphia, United States	CoreStates Spectrum	36,648 / 36,648	$917,604
December 29	Philadelphia, United States	CoreStates Spectrum	36,648 / 36,648	$917,604
December 30	Boston, United States	FleetCenter	36,968 / 36,968	$1,016,860
December 31	Boston, United States	FleetCenter	36,968 / 36,968	$1,016,860
TOTAL			397,738 / 401,246 (99%)	$9,590,608

=== 1997 ===
1997 proved to be the band's most prolific songwriting period, as no fewer than 20 new originals were debuted in concert throughout the year. This year also marked a major shift in the band's sound and style, where improvisation became more prevalent than ever, focusing heavily on funk and groove, with rapid-fire guitar solos taking a back seat. It would not be uncommon to see the band's setlists feature five titles, or fewer, while still running 90 minutes or more. Traditional "jam" numbers were taken to new extremes while other songs that were not previously utilized as improvisational springboards, such as "Tube", "AC/DC Bag", and "Halley's Comet", were explored to great effect. The band's Worcester show on 29 November featured a version of "Runaway Jim", to kick off the second set, which lasted 59 minutes – the longest "song" performance of their career.

The band headlined a winter tour of Europe in February and March. Excerpts from the 1 March show at Markthalle in Hamburg were later released as the live album Slip Stitch and Pass. Before embarking on their summer tour of the United States, they returned to Europe in June and July for a series of concerts that focused heavily on new material. Most of these shows were headlining gigs, but there were a number of festival dates including a return to Roskilde and the band's only appearance at the famed Glastonbury Festival. The band's 6 July performance in Desenzano, Italy, is notable in that the band's afternoon sound check was open to the public and became a performance in itself, with one-off songs and jams, audience requests, audience karaoke (with the band backing them up), and even a limbo contest on stage.

Phish returned to the United States in July for a month-long summer tour of sold-out amphitheaters, culminating in another huge festival – The Great Went – held in remote Limestone, Maine in the upper northeastern corner of the US. 70,000 fans attended the festival, which once again included seven sets of music from Phish over two days (one of which was a late-night "disco set" with all four members on keyboards). The Great Went was the sequel to The Clifford Ball, taking place on August 16 and 17, 1997, close to the Canada–US border at the Loring Air Force Base in Limestone, Maine. The event was named after a quote from the movie Twin Peaks: Fire Walk with Me.

The world's largest fire truck hosed down thousands of fans as they arrived Saturday morning, and on Sunday morning, approximately 1,100 people posed nude as part of a fifty-state tour by photographer Spencer Tunick. Throughout the weekend, the members of the audience each painted their own individual piece of art. The resultant pieces of fan artwork were attached to one another to create a tower that was eventually several stories high. The band also created their own piece of art during a jam on the final night. Later that evening, the band passed their artwork through the audience. To create a connection between audience and band, the band's artwork was attached to the fan artwork. As seen in Bittersweet Motel, a giant matchstick was lit, burning the tower to the ground.

Phish was the only band that played the main stage, performing seven sets of music over two nights, including a disco set at 2:30 AM featuring all four members on keyboards. The Bangor Symphony Orchestra performed Debussy and Stravinsky during the afternoon of the second day, accompanied by a glider pilot who soared above the audience. During Phish's performance of "Vultures," a couple from Putnam, Connecticut, Terry Moggio and Maggie Loobadeery, exchanged wedding vows on the concert grounds in a ceremony executed by local favorite Stick Treadgood.

75,000 people attended, making the event Phish's largest concert to date, and the top-grossing rock concert in the United States in the summer of 1997. Fans camped out onsite in tents, making Limestone the largest city in Maine over the weekend.

During the summer tour, film director Todd Phillips began filming a documentary of the band titled Bittersweet Motel that would finally hit theaters in 2000.

On 7 November, Phish made their first appearance on Late Night With Conan O'Brien, to promote Slip Stitch And Pass, with all four members of the band sporting beards. Rather than performing a track from the album, or another well-known tune, they unveiled a new song called "Farmhouse". It would be quite some time before this song made it into the band's regular rotation, making this performance a relative anomaly.

Following their Conan appearance, Phish embarked on a November/December tour that saw them further exploring dark, groove-based improvisation (dubbed by fans as "cow funk"), with songs stretched out to previously unheard lengths. This tour culminated in a four-show holiday run, including three sold-out shows at Madison Square Garden.

Original song debuts in 1997 included "Walfredo", "Rock-a-William", "Dogs Stole Things", "Carini", "Twist", "Limb by Limb", "Piper", "Vultures", "Ghost", "Olivia's Pool", "Water in the Sky", "Wading in the Velvet Sea", "I Don't Care", "Saw it Again", "Bye Bye Foot", "Dirt", "Meatstick", "Black-Eyed Katy", "Waking Up", and "Farmhouse."

==== 1997 warmup and support shows ====
List of 1997 warm-up and support shows, showing date, city, country, venue
Date (1997)	City	Country	Venue
German Radio Performance
February 26	Baden-Baden	Germany	SWF3 Studios
Late Show with David Letterman
March 5	New York City	United States	Late Show with David Letterman
Phish Food Launch Benefit for the Waterwheel Foundation
March 18	Burlington	United States	Flynn Theater
Philadelphia Flyers game
May 18	Philadelphia	United States	CoreStates Spectrum
Private concert
June 6	Charlotte	United States	Brad Sands's and Pete Carini's House
Late Night with Conan O'Brien
November 7	New York City	United States	Late Night with Conan O'Brien
Philadelphia Flyers game
December 1	Philadelphia	United States	CoreStates Spectrum

==== 1997 dates ====
List of 1997 tour dates, showing date, city, country, venue
Date (1997)	City	Country	Venue
Europe Winter 1997
February 13	London	England	Shepherd's Bush Empire
February 14	Brussels	Belgium	Le Botanique
February 16	Cologne	Germany	Alter Wartesaal
February 17	Amsterdam	Netherlands	Paradiso
February 18	Paris	France	Bataclan
February 20	Milan	Italy	Teatro Smeraldo
February 21	Florence	Italy	Tenax
February 22	Rome	Italy	Teatro Olimpico
February 23	Cortemaggiore	Italy	Fillmore
February 25	Munich	Germany	Incognito
February 26	Stuttgart	Germany	Longhorn
February 28	Berlin	Germany	Huxley's Neue Welt
March 1	Hamburg	Germany	Markthalle
March 2	Copenhagen	Denmark	Pumpehuset
Europe Summer 1997
June 13	Dublin	Ireland	SFX Centre
June 14	Dublin	Ireland	SFX Centre
June 16	London	England	Royal Albert Hall
June 19	Vienna	Austria	Vienna Arena
June 20	Prague	Czech Republic	Archa Theatre
June 21	Scheeßel	Germany	Hurricane Festival
June 22	Sankt Goarshausen	Germany	WDR Festival
June 24	Strasbourg	France	La Laiterie
June 25	Lille	France	L'Aeronef
June 27	Pilton	England	Glastonbury Festival of Contemporary Performing Arts
June 29	Roskilde	Denmark	Roskilde Festival
July 1	Amsterdam	Netherlands	Paradiso
July 2	Amsterdam	Netherlands	Paradiso
July 3	Nuremberg	Germany	Serenadenhof
July 5	Como	Italy	Piazza Risorgimento
July 6	Desenzano del Garda	Italy	Spiaggia di Rivoltella
July 9	Lyon	France	Le Transbordeur
July 10	Marseille	France	Espace Julien
July 11	Escalarre	Spain	Doctor Music Festival
U.S. Summer 1997
July 21	Virginia Beach	United States	GTE Virginia Beach Amphitheatre
July 22	Raleigh	United States	Hardee's Walnut Creek Amphitheatre
July 23	Atlanta	United States	Coca-Cola Lakewood Amphitheatre
July 25	Dallas	United States	Coca-Cola Starplex Amphitheatre
July 26	Austin	United States	Southpark Meadows
July 29	Phoenix	United States	Blockbuster Desert Sky Pavilion
July 30	Ventura	United States	Ventura County Fairgrounds
July 31	Mountain View	United States	Shoreline Amphitheatre
August 2	George	United States	The Gorge Amphitheatre
August 3	George	United States	The Gorge Amphitheatre
August 6	Maryland Heights	United States	Riverport Amphitheatre
August 8	Tinley Park	United States	First Midwest Bank Amphitheatre
August 9	East Troy	United States	Alpine Valley Music Theatre
August 10	Noblesville	United States	Deer Creek Music Center
August 11	Noblesville	United States	Deer Creek Music Center
August 13	Burgettstown	United States	Coca-Cola Star Lake Amphitheatre
August 14	Darien Center	United States	Darien Lake Performing Arts Center
The Great Went
August 16	Limestone	United States	Loring Air Force Base
August 17	Limestone	United States	Loring Air Force Base
U.S. Fall 1997 (Phish Destroys America)
November 13	Las Vegas	United States	Thomas & Mack Center
November 14	West Valley City	United States	E Center
November 16	Denver	United States	McNichols Sports Arena
November 17	Denver	United States	McNichols Sports Arena
November 19	Champaign	United States	Assembly Hall
November 21	Hampton	United States	Hampton Coliseum
November 22	Hampton	United States	Hampton Coliseum
November 23	Winston-Salem	United States	Lawrence Joel Veterans Memorial Coliseum
November 26	Hartford	United States	Hartford Civic Center
November 28	Worcester	United States	Worcester Centrum Centre
November 29	Worcester	United States	Worcester Centrum Centre
November 30	Worcester	United States	Worcester Centrum Centre
December 2	Philadelphia	United States	CoreStates Spectrum
December 3	Philadelphia	United States	CoreStates Spectrum
December 5	Cleveland	United States	CSU Convocation Center
December 6	Auburn Hills	United States	The Palace of Auburn Hills
December 7	Fairborn	United States	Ervin J. Nutter Center
December 9	State College	United States	Bryce Jordan Center
December 11	Rochester	United States	Rochester Community War Memorial
December 12	Albany	United States	Pepsi Arena
December 13	Albany	United States	Pepsi Arena
NYE Run 1997
December 28	Landover	United States	USAir Arena
December 29	New York City	United States	Madison Square Garden
December 30	New York City	United States	Madison Square Garden
December 31	New York City	United States	Madison Square Garden

==== Box office score data ====
List of box office score data with date, city, venue, attendance, gross
Date (1998)	City	Venue	Attendance	Gross
July 21	Virginia Beach, United States	GTE Virginia Beach Amphitheatre	20,074 / 20,074	$486,775
August 2	George, United States	The Gorge Amphitheatre	37,871 / 40,000	$1,023,129
August 3	George, United States	The Gorge Amphitheatre	37,871 / 40,000	$1,023,129
August 9	East Troy, United States	Alpine Valley Music Theatre	34,642 / 34,642	$866,202
August 10	Noblesville, United States	Deer Creek Music Center	41,782 / 41,782	$1,044,762
August 11	Noblesville, United States	Deer Creek Music Center	41,782 / 41,782	$1,044,762
August 16	Limestone, United States	Loring Air Force Base	123,176 / 123,176	$4,337,184
August 17	Limestone, United States	Loring Air Force Base	123,176 / 123,176	$4,337,184
December 29	New York City, United States	Madison Square Garden	56,704 / 56,704	$1,583,886
December 30	New York City, United States	Madison Square Garden	56,704 / 56,704	$1,583,886
December 31	New York City, United States	Madison Square Garden	56,704 / 56,704	$1,583,886
TOTAL			314,249 / 316,378 (99%)	$9,341,938

=== 1998 ===
Whenever Phish was off the road in 1997, the group worked on a new studio project that continued into the early months of 1998. Feeling a bit restless, the band took a few days off in April to play The Island Tour. The tour consisted of two shows on Long Island, New York, and two shows in Providence, Rhode Island. These shows continued the "cow funk" vibe of the previous year, featuring long, spaced-out funk jams and a number of new-song debuts, including the soon-to-be-classic, "Birds Of A Feather". All four shows were released as live albums.

Phish briefly toured Europe in July before returning to the United States for another month-long summer tour. The dark grooves of the previous year and the Island Tour, had somewhat subsided by this point, and Phish had begun to settle into a new style that, while still relying heavily on improvisation, was far less murky.

On August 1, Phish began debuting a new cover song at nearly every show, starting with "Ramble On" by Led Zeppelin at a show at Alpine Valley in East Troy, Wisconsin. Covers were by Cole Porter, Smashing Pumpkins, Van Halen, the Velvet Underground, Allen Toussaint and the Beastie Boys, followed by a rendition of the Grateful Dead's "Terrapin Station" as the band stopped in Virginia Beach on August 9, the third anniversary of the death of Jerry Garcia. These were in addition to covers by Ween, Corneille, 2Pac, Los Lobos, Johnny Winter, Dry Bread, ZZ Top (×2), the Who (×2), Marvin Gaye, Son Seals, the Blues Brothers, the Rolling Stones (×2), Edgar Winter, Led Zeppelin (not "Ramble On"), Jimi Hendrix (×2), Neil Young, Robert Palmer, Steve Earle, Talking Heads (×2), Jane's Addiction, Richard Strauss, Stevie Wonder, Syd Barrett, Neil Diamond, Bob Marley, Little Feat, B.B. King, Blues Image and Henry Mancini at points throughout the tour as well. Phish had been relentlessly compared to the Dead throughout their career and often cited as the apparent heir to the Dead's throne, resulting in Phish making a strong effort to distance themselves from the Dead. The band had not performed a Grateful Dead song in concert since April 1, 1986 – twelve years earlier – when they were a five-man college band that had yet to play outside of Vermont. For the encore in Virginia Beach, Phish performed the Dead's multi-part suite "Terrapin Station". Former members of the Grateful Dead extended a "thank you" to Phish in their quarterly newsletter. A few months later, Dead bassist Phil Lesh reached out to Trey Anastasio and Page McConnell to join him, former Dead vocalist Donna Jean Godchaux and others to perform three nights of Dead and Phish music in April 1999. Members of Phish and the Dead now have a strong relationship, with Trey having played guitar in the Dead's 50th anniversary "Fare Thee Well" lineup, and bands such as Rhythm Devils and SerialPod containing members of both bands.

The band finished their summer tour with another huge festival in Maine called The Lemonwheel. 60,000 people attended and the band played seven sets over two nights, including an instrumental set of ambient music surrounded by candles made by fans throughout the weekend. Lemonwheel was the third festival hosted by the band, taking place on August 15 and 16, 1998, again at Loring Air Force Base in Limestone, Maine. 60,000 people attended creating a community of fans that, again, made Limestone one of the largest cities in Maine over the weekend.

Phish was the only band to play the main stage, performing seven sets of music over two nights. Several other bands, including Keller Williams and Manic Mule, played in the sidestage. The concert grounds, shaped like a large figure 8, contained several beer gardens, a Ferris wheel, an elephant, jugglers, and stiltsmen. At the festival, the audience made candles throughout the weekend. Saturday night's fourth set included an hour-long ambient jam on a dark stage covered in hundreds of homemade candles. On Sunday, the night ended with the band lighting fuses onstage, burning a path through the stage and activating a large elephant that sprayed a gusher of water into the air from its trunk, and then slowly made its way through the audience to the tune of "Baby Elephant Walk".

In October, Phish performed at the annual Farm Aid festival, jamming onstage with Neil Young, Willie Nelson, Paul Shaffer, and others. After an unannounced show at The Fillmore, in San Francisco, Phish appeared at Neil Young's annual Bridge School Benefit, performing two nights in a rare acoustic setting, featuring several debuts, stripped-down versions of Phish classics, and onstage collaborations with Neil Young, Sarah McLachlan, and Kevin Hearn. Two days later, Phish appeared on the PBS program Sessions At West 54th, conversing with host David Byrne and performing a set that drew heavily from their soon-to-be-released seventh studio album.

Capping off their busy-but-non-traditional October was the release of The Story of the Ghost. A relatively accurate studio representation of the "cow funk" period, much of the album was culled from hours of improvisation that took place in the studio throughout 1997 and 1998, and combined with several of the songs that had been debuted in Europe the previous year. They marked the occasion by performing "Birds Of A Feather" on Late Show With David Letterman on the day of release, before embarking on their fall tour, two days later.

On Halloween night in Las Vegas, the group performed Loaded by the Velvet Underground as their annual musical costume. Two days later, the band surprised fans by performing an unannounced rendition of Pink Floyd's The Dark Side of the Moon at a show in West Valley City, Utah. Phish continued touring throughout November, including two nights at Hampton Coliseum, which were later released as the boxed set Hampton Comes Alive, and they capped off the year with a four-night stand at Madison Square Garden, the band's first extended run at their beloved second home.

Original song debuts in 1998 included "Birds of a Feather", "Frankie Says", "Roggae", "Shafty", "Meat", "Fikus", "Brian and Robert", "Bittersweet Motel", "The Moma Dance", "Never", "Sleep", and "Driver".

==== Costumes ====
During a two-night run in Las Vegas, the first night celebrated the band's fifteenth anniversary and the second night saw the band perform the Velvet Underground's Loaded. Some songs, including "Rock and Roll", became concert staples and fan favorites. The show has been released in its entirety as Live Phish Volume 16.

Fans in West Valley, Utah, received a surprise performance of Pink Floyd's The Dark Side of the Moon between the banter of "Harpua" on November 2, 1998.

Unlike the Halloween extravaganzas, the performance has not been officially released but is currently being circulated through fan tape trading websites.

===== 1998 warm-up and support shows =====
List of 1998 warm-up and support shows, showing date, city, country, venue
Date (1998)	City	Country	Venue
Farm Aid
October 3	Tinley Park	United States	Farm Aid '98
Secret Show
October 15	San Francisco	United States	The Fillmore
Bridge School Benefit
October 17	Mountain View	United States	Shoreline Amphitheatre
October 18	Mountain View	United States	Shoreline Amphitheatre
TV Tapings
October 20	New York City	United States	Sessions at West 54th
October 27	New York City	United States	Late Show with David Letterman
Radio performance
November 3	Boulder	United States	KBCO Studios

===== 1998 dates =====
List of 1998 tour dates, showing date, city, country, venue
Date (1998)	City	Country	Venue
Island Tour 1998
April 2	Uniondale	United States	Nassau Veterans Memorial Coliseum
April 3	Uniondale	United States	Nassau Veterans Memorial Coliseum
April 4	Providence	United States	Providence Civic Center
April 5	Providence	United States	Providence Civic Center
Europe Summer 1998
June 30	Copenhagen	Denmark	The Grey Hall
July 1	Copenhagen	Denmark	The Grey Hall
July 2	Copenhagen	Denmark	The Grey Hall
July 3	Ringe	Denmark	Dyrskuepladsen
July 5	Prague	Czech Republic	Lucerna Hall
July 6	Prague	Czech Republic	Lucerna Hall
July 8	Barcelona	Spain	Zeleste
July 9	Barcelona	Spain	Zeleste
July 10	Barcelona	Spain	Zeleste
U.S. Summer 1998
July 15	Portland	United States	Portland Meadows
July 16	George	United States	The Gorge Amphitheatre
July 17	George	United States	The Gorge Amphitheatre
July 19	Mountain View	United States	Shoreline Amphitheatre
July 20	Ventura	United States	Ventura County Fairgrounds
July 21	Phoenix	United States	Blockbuster Desert Sky Pavilion
July 24	The Woodlands	United States	Cynthia Woods Mitchell Pavilion
July 25	Austin	United States	Southpark Meadows
July 26	Dallas	United States	Starplex Amphitheatre
July 28	Bonner Springs	United States	Sandstone Amphitheater
July 29	Maryland Heights	United States	Riverport Amphitheater
July 31	Columbus	United States	Polaris Amphitheater
August 1	East Troy	United States	Alpine Valley Music Theatre
August 2	Noblesville	United States	Deer Creek Music Center
August 3	Noblesville	United States	Deer Creek Music Center
August 6	Atlanta	United States	Coca-Cola Lakewood Amphitheatre
August 7	Raleigh	United States	Walnut Creek Amphitheatre
August 8	Columbia	United States	Merriweather Post Pavilion
August 9	Virginia Beach	United States	Virginia Beach Amphitheater
August 11	Burgettstown	United States	Coca-Cola Star Lake Amphitheater
August 12	Vernon	United States	Vernon Downs Raceway
Lemonwheel
August 15	Limestone	United States	Loring Air Force Base
August 16	Limestone	United States	Loring Air Force Base
U.S. Fall 1998
October 29	Berkeley	United States	William Randolph Hearst Greek Theatre
October 30	Las Vegas	United States	Thomas & Mack Center
October 31	Las Vegas	United States	Thomas & Mack Center
November 2	West Valley City	United States	E Center
November 4	Denver	United States	McNichols Sports Arena
November 6	Madison	United States	Kohl Center
November 7	Chicago	United States	UIC Pavilion
November 8	Chicago	United States	UIC Pavilion
November 9	Chicago	United States	UIC Pavilion
November 11	Grand Rapids	United States	Van Andel Arena
November 13	Cleveland	United States	CSU Convocation Center
November 14	Cincinnati	United States	The Crown
November 15	Murfreesboro	United States	Monte Hale Arena
November 18	Greenville	United States	BI-LO Center
November 19	Winston-Salem	United States	Lawrence Joel Veterans Memorial Coliseum
November 20	Hampton	United States	Hampton Coliseum
November 21	Hampton	United States	Hampton Coliseum
November 24	New Haven	United States	New Haven Veterans Memorial Coliseum
November 25	Albany	United States	Pepsi Arena
November 27	Worcester	United States	Worcester's Centrum Centre
November 28	Worcester	United States	Worcester's Centrum Centre
November 29	Worcester	United States	Worcester's Centrum Centre
1998 New Year's Eve Run
December 28	New York City	United States	Madison Square Garden
December 29	New York City	United States	Madison Square Garden
December 30	New York City	United States	Madison Square Garden
December 31	New York City	United States	Madison Square Garden

==== Box office score data ====
List of box office score data with date, city, venue, attendance, gross
Date (1998)	City	Venue	Attendance	Gross
April 2	Uniondale, United States	Nassau Veterans Memorial Coliseum	34,348 / 34,348	$824,328
April 3	Uniondale, United States	Nassau Veterans Memorial Coliseum	34,348 / 34,348	$824,328
July 16	George, United States	The Gorge Amphitheatre	31,544 / 40,000	$854,900
July 17	George, United States	The Gorge Amphitheatre	31,544 / 40,000	$854,900
August 2	Noblesville, United States	Deer Creek Music Center	42,158 / 42,158	$1,092,811
August 3	Noblesville, United States	Deer Creek Music Center	42,158 / 42,158	$1,092,811
August 15	Limestone, United States	Loring Air Force Base	105,836 / 105,836	$4,012,715
August 16	Limestone, United States	Loring Air Force Base	105,836 / 105,836	$4,012,715
October 30	Las Vegas, United States	Thomas & Mack Center	35,635 / 35,635	$935,485
October 31	Las Vegas, United States	Thomas & Mack Center	35,635 / 35,635	$935,485
November 4	Denver, United States	McNichols Sports Arena	13,826 / 13,826	$327,916
November 6	Madison, United States	Kohl Center	16,906 / 16,906	$363,889
November 7	Chicago, United States	UIC Pavilion	30,161 / 30,161	$754,723
November 8	Chicago, United States	UIC Pavilion	30,161 / 30,161	$754,723
November 9	Chicago, United States	UIC Pavilion	30,161 / 30,161	$754,723
November 20	Hampton, United States	Hampton Coliseum	27,335 / 27,335	$642,658
November 21	Hampton, United States	Hampton Coliseum	27,335 / 27,335	$642,658
December 28	New York City, United States	Madison Square Garden	73,824 / 73,824	$2,047,576
December 29	New York City, United States	Madison Square Garden	73,824 / 73,824	$2,047,576
December 30	New York City, United States	Madison Square Garden	73,824 / 73,824	$2,047,576
December 31	New York City, United States	Madison Square Garden	73,824 / 73,824	$2,047,576
TOTAL			411,573 / 420,029 (98%)	$11,857,001

=== 1999 ===
Phish took the first half of 1999 off from touring and recording. Trey Anastasio embarked on his first ever solo tour in the spring, and Page McConnell compiled tracks from Phish's 1997 and 1998 recording sessions to produce The Siket Disc, an instrumental album that was released online in June (the disc would be available in stores the following year).

The band finally hit the road in the summer, embarking on another annual summer tour of the United States. Phish performed their first of two Fourth of July celebrations with a two-night stand in Atlanta. The first night featured the unveiling of "The Meatstick Dance", which would be performed by band and audience throughout the year. Instead of throwing another huge summer festival to close out the tour, the band decided to focus all festival activities to the Millennium New Year's Eve celebration. However, while attempting to work with West Coast promoter Bill Graham Presents, plans to have the festival in Hawaii and the Glen Helen Amphitheater in Southern California failed to materialize. Previous festival promoter Great Northeast Productions were given the task of finding a site.

Originally billed as two shows by Great Northeast Productions and not a festival, The "Oswego Airport Campout," later named Camp Oswego took place on July 17 and 18, 1999, at the Oswego County Airport in Volney, New York. 65,000 people attended and Phish played five sets of music over two days. A number of other groups such as Ozomatli, the Del McCoury Band, and Son Seals performed on a side stage throughout the weekend. 65,000 people attended. This event was acknowledged as the band's fourth festival when the band announced 2009's Festival 8.

Shortly after, on August 12, Phish announced NYE 2000 at Big Cypress. It was the fifth and largest of ten weekend-long festivals hosted by the band. The event took place on the eve of the millennium – December 30 and 31, 1999, at the Big Cypress Indian Reservation near the Big Cypress National Preserve in southern Florida. 85,000 people attended, making it the largest Millennium Eve concert on earth that night, surpassing shows by Sting, Barbra Streisand, Aerosmith, Billy Joel, Eric Clapton, Rod Stewart, The Eagles, Eminem, Jimmy Buffett, Kiss, Metallica, the Red Hot Chili Peppers, and Elton John.

In a 2000 cover story for Entertainment Weekly, three of the four Phish members declared Big Cypress to be the greatest Phish concert ever. It was also voted as the most popular Phish show ever by fans in the final volume of The Pharmer's Almanac. It was also the longest Phish concert ever, culminating in a seven-and-a-half-hour second set from midnight on New Year's Eve to sunrise New Year's Day. Phish was the only band at the event, performing five sets of music (nearly sixteen hours) over two nights. As fans left the concert area at sunrise, the Beatles' "Here Comes the Sun" played over the PA speakers. Band and audience attempted to break the world record for the largest number of people doing the same dance at one time during the song "Meatstick," but the record was not broken (representatives from the Guinness Book of World Records were on hand). The end of the summer tour saw Phish make their first journey to Japan, to perform four shows at the Fuji Rock Festival. During the summer and fall, the band adopted a number of songs performed by Trey Anastasio just months earlier on his solo tour. Many of these songs contained repetitive bass lines and techno- and electronica-themed improvisational excursions (with Anastasio and McConnell using a series of electronic effects), a sound that Phish would hone throughout 1999 and 2000.

==== 1999 dates ====
List of 1999 tour dates, showing date, city, country, venue
Date (1999)	City	Country	Venue
Early U.S. Summer 1999
June 30	Bonner Springs	United States	Sandstone Amphitheater
July 1	Nashville	United States	First American Music Center
July 3	Atlanta	United States	Lakewood Amphitheatre
July 4	Atlanta	United States	Lakewood Amphitheatre
July 7	Charlotte	United States	Blockbuster Pavilion
July 8	Virginia Beach	United States	GTE Virginia Beach Amphitheater
July 9	Columbia	United States	Merriweather Post Pavilion
July 10	Camden	United States	Blockbuster-Sony Music Entertainment Centre
July 12	Mansfield	United States	Tweeter Center for the Performing Arts
July 13	Mansfield	United States	Tweeter Center for the Performing Arts
July 15	Holmdel	United States	PNC Bank Arts Center
July 16	Holmdel	United States	PNC Bank Arts Center
Oswego Airport Campout aka Camp Oswego
July 17	Volney	United States	Oswego County Airport
July 18	Volney	United States	Oswego County Airport
Late North America Summer 1999
July 20	Toronto	Canada	Molson Canadian Amphitheatre
July 21	Burgettstown	United States	Coca-Cola Star Lake Amphitheater
July 23	Columbus	United States	Polaris Amphitheater
July 24	East Troy	United States	Alpine Valley Music Theater
July 25	Noblesville	United States	Deer Creek Music Center
July 26	Noblesville	United States	Deer Creek Music Center
Japan Summer 1999
July 30 (2 shows)	Yuzawa	Japan	Fuji Rock Festival
July 31	Yuzawa	Japan	Fuji Rock Festival
August 1	Yuzawa	Japan	Fuji Rock Festival
North America Fall 1999
September 9	Vancouver	Canada	General Motors Place
September 10	George	United States	The Gorge Amphitheatre
September 11	George	United States	The Gorge Amphitheatre
September 12	Portland	United States	Portland Meadows
September 14	Boise	United States	Boise State University Pavilion
September 16	Mountain View	United States	Shoreline Amphitheatre
September 17	Mountain View	United States	Shoreline Amphitheatre
September 18	Chula Vista	United States	Coors Amphitheatre
September 19	Irvine	United States	Irvine Meadows Amphitheatre
September 21	Tucson	United States	Pima County Fairgrounds
September 22	Las Cruces	United States	Pan American Center
September 24	Austin	United States	Southpark Meadows
September 25	The Woodlands	United States	Cynthia Woods Mitchell Pavilion
September 26	New Orleans	United States	Senator Nat G. Kiefer University of New Orleans Lakefront Arena
September 28	Pelham	United States	Oak Mountain Amphitheatre
September 29	Memphis	United States	Pyramid Arena
October 1	Ames	United States	James H. Hilton Coliseum
October 2	Minneapolis	United States	Target Center
October 3	Rosemont	United States	Allstate Arena
October 4	Normal	United States	Doug Collins Court at Redbird Arena
October 7	Uniondale	United States	Nassau Veterans Memorial Coliseum
October 8	Uniondale	United States	Nassau Veterans Memorial Coliseum
October 9	Albany	United States	Pepsi Arena
October 10	Albany	United States	Pepsi Arena
U.S. Winter 1999
December 2	Auburn Hills	United States	The Palace of Auburn Hills
December 3	Cincinnati	United States	Firstar Center
December 4	Cincinnati	United States	Firstar Center
December 5	Rochester	United States	The Blue Cross Arena at War Memorial
December 7	Portland	United States	Cumberland County Civic Center
December 8	Portland	United States	Cumberland County Civic Center
December 10	Philadelphia	United States	First Union Spectrum
December 11	Philadelphia	United States	First Union Spectrum
December 12	Hartford	United States	Hartford Civic Center
December 13	Providence	United States	Providence Civic Center
December 15	Washington, D.C.	United States	MCI Center
December 16	Raleigh	United States	William Neal Reynolds Coliseum
December 17	Hampton	United States	Hampton Coliseum
December 18	Hampton	United States	Hampton Coliseum
Big Cypress
December 29	Clewiston	United States	Big Cypress Indian Reservation
December 30	Clewiston	United States	Big Cypress Indian Reservation
December 31	Clewiston	United States	Big Cypress Indian Reservation

==== Box office score data ====
List of box office score data with date, city, venue, attendance, gross
Date (1999)	City	Venue	Attendance	Gross
July 3	Atlanta, United States	Lakewood Amphitheatre	37,822 / 37,822	$1,057,431
July 4	Atlanta, United States	Lakewood Amphitheatre	37,822 / 37,822	$1,057,431
July 17	Volney, United States	Oswego County Airport	101,172 / 101,172	$3,839,730
July 18	Volney, United States	Oswego County Airport	101,172 / 101,172	$3,839,730
July 25	Noblesville, United States	Deer Creek Music Center	41,553 / 41,553	$1,101,155
July 26	Noblesville, United States	Deer Creek Music Center	41,553 / 41,553	$1,101,155
September 10	George, United States	The Gorge Amphitheatre	29,383 / 40,000	$849,713
September 11	George, United States	The Gorge Amphitheatre	29,383 / 40,000	$849,713
October 3	Rosemont, United States	Allstate Arena	17,963 / 17,963	$495,065
October 7	Uniondale, United States	Nassau Veterans Memorial Coliseum	30,977 / 36,016	$772,341
October 8	Uniondale, United States	Nassau Veterans Memorial Coliseum	30,977 / 36,016	$772,341
October 9	Albany, United States	Pepsi Arena	33,842 / 33,842	$807,730
October 10	Albany, United States	Pepsi Arena	33,842 / 33,842	$807,730
December 7	Portland, United States	Cumberland County Civic Center	17,437 / 17,437	$462,081
December 8	Portland, United States	Cumberland County Civic Center	17,437 / 17,437	$462,081
December 10	Philadelphia, United States	First Union Spectrum	36,843 / 36,843	$976,412
December 11	Philadelphia, United States	First Union Spectrum	36,843 / 36,843	$976,412
December 17	Hampton, United States	Hampton Coliseum	27,600 / 27,600	$676,325
December 18	Hampton, United States	Hampton Coliseum	27,600 / 27,600	$676,325
December 30	Clewiston, United States	Big Cypress Indian Reservation	75,000 / 75,000	$11,639,550
December 31	Clewiston, United States	Big Cypress Indian Reservation	75,000 / 75,000	$11,639,550
TOTAL			449,592 / 465,248 (97%)	$22,677,533

== 2000s ==
=== 2000 ===
In the spring of 2000, the band finished up recording the new studio album Farmhouse, which featured mostly songs that had been performed onstage as far back as 1997. Anastasio was responsible for most of the album's writing and direction. In mid-May, Phish performed their first concerts at New York's Radio City Music Hall. The band underwent their most intensive promo tour, on release of Farmhouse, recording several short sets for various radio and TV programs.

In June, the band visited Japan for the second time in two years, performing a number of headlining and festival shows. By the end of the month, Phish was back in the United States for another month-long summer tour, kicking off with a star-studded opening night in Nashville featuring appearances by Wynonna Judd, Ricky Skaggs, and the Del McCoury Band. In mid-July, Phish performed on the long-running series Austin City Limits. For the first time since 1995, the band did not hold an annual end-of-summer festival. Additionally, for the second year in a row, Phish did not perform their annual Halloween music costume.

Towards the end of their fall tour at a webcast show that would be released on DVD as Phish: Live in Vegas, Trey Anastasio announced that the band was taking an indefinite break following the tour. Therefore, for the first time since 1988, there would be no Phish New Year's Eve concert. On October 6 and 7, the band played a two-night stand at the Shoreline Amphitheatre just outside San Francisco, which would be the band's final concerts before their indefinite hiatus. The band went their separate ways following the shows.

Phish debuted no new material in 2000, with the exception of "Guy Forget" (a song played in sound check since 1993).

List of 2000 tour dates, showing date, city, country, venue
Date (2000)	City	Country	Venue
2000 New York City Run
May 21	New York City	United States	Radio City Music Hall
May 22	New York City	United States	Radio City Music Hall
May 23	New York City	United States	Roseland Ballroom
Japan Summer 2000
June 9	Tokyo	Japan	On Air East
June 10	Tokyo	Japan	Zepp
June 11	Tokyo	Japan	Hibiya Outdoor Theatre
June 13	Nagoya	Japan	Club Quattro
June 14	Fukuoka	Japan	Drum Logos
June 15	Osaka	Japan	Big Cat
June 16	Osaka	Japan	Zepp
North America Summer 2000
June 22	Nashville	United States	AmSouth Amphitheatre
June 23	Atlanta	United States	Lakewood Amphitheatre
June 24	Atlanta	United States	Lakewood Amphitheatre
June 25	Raleigh	United States	Alltel Pavilion
June 28	Holmdel	United States	PNC Bank Arts Center
June 29	Holmdel	United States	PNC Bank Arts Center
June 30	Hartford	United States	Meadows Music Theatre
July 1	Hartford	United States	Meadows Music Theatre
July 3	Camden	United States	Blockbuster-Sony Music Entertainment Centre
July 4	Camden	United States	Blockbuster-Sony Music Entertainment Centre
July 6	Toronto	Canada	Molson Canadian Amphitheatre
July 7	Burgettstown	United States	Coca-Cola Star Lake Amphitheater
July 8	East Troy	United States	Alpine Valley Music Theatre
July 10	Noblesville	United States	Deer Creek Music Center
July 11	Noblesville	United States	Deer Creek Music Center
July 12	Noblesville	United States	Deer Creek Music Center
July 14	Columbus	United States	Polaris Amphitheater
July 15	Columbus	United States	Polaris Amphitheater
U.S. Fall 2000
September 8	Albany	United States	Pepsi Arena
September 9	Albany	United States	Pepsi Arena
September 11	Mansfield	United States	Tweeter Center for the Performing Arts
September 12	Mansfield	United States	Tweeter Center for the Performing Arts
September 14	Darien Center	United States	Darien Lake Performing Arts Center
September 15	Hershey	United States	Hersheypark Stadium
September 17	Columbia	United States	Merriweather Post Pavilion
September 18	Cuyahoga Falls	United States	Blossom Music Center
September 20	Cincinnati	United States	Riverbend Music Center
September 22	Rosemont	United States	Allstate Arena
September 23	Rosemont	United States	Allstate Arena
September 24	Minneapolis	United States	Target Center
September 25	Bonner Springs	United States	Sandstone Amphitheater
September 27	Greenwood Village	United States	Fiddler's Green Amphitheatre
September 29	Las Vegas	United States	Thomas & Mack Center
September 30	Las Vegas	United States	Thomas & Mack Center
October 1	Phoenix	United States	Blockbuster Desert Sky Pavilion
October 4	Chula Vista	United States	Coors Amphitheatre
October 5	Irvine	United States	Irvine Meadows Amphitheatre
October 6	Mountain View	United States	Shoreline Amphitheatre
October 7	Mountain View	United States	Shoreline Amphitheatre

==== Box office score data ====
List of box office score data with date, city, venue, attendance, gross
Date (2000)	City	Venue	Attendance	Gross
July 10	Noblesville, United States	Deer Creek Music Center	74,212 / 74,212	$2,040,888
July 11	Noblesville, United States	Deer Creek Music Center	74,212 / 74,212	$2,040,888
July 12	Noblesville, United States	Deer Creek Music Center	74,212 / 74,212	$2,040,888
September 15	Hershey, United States	Hersheypark Stadium	30,034 / 30,034	$847,505
September 22	Rosemont, United States	Allstate Arena	36,447 / 36,447	$1,011,582
September 23	Rosemont, United States	Allstate Arena	36,447 / 36,447	$1,011,582
September 29	Las Vegas, United States	Thomas & Mack Center	35,585 / 36,500	$978,588
September 30	Las Vegas, United States	Thomas & Mack Center	35,585 / 36,500	$978,588
TOTAL			176,278 / 177,193 (99%)	$4,878,563

=== 2002 ===
Phish regrouped in late 2002 with the surprise release of their ninth studio album, Round Room. While two of the songs had been previously performed by the Trey Anastasio Band, the remainder of the material was new. This occasion was marked by the announcement of a four-show holiday run as well as performances on Saturday Night Live and Late Show with David Letterman, each appearance featuring a performance of a different song from the album ("46 Days" and "All Of These Dreams", respectively). Additionally, the members of Phish appeared with Jimmy Fallon, Horatio Sanz, and Al Gore in a "Jerrod's Room" sketch, performing a snippet of "Contact".

The only show played this year was a New Year's Eve concert in Madison Square Garden on December 31, followed by three shows at the Hampton Coliseum in Virginia on January 2, 3, and 4.

Including their TV debuts, five songs made their first appearances this year: "46 Days", "All Of These Dreams", "Waves", "Seven Below", and "Walls of the Cave".

List of 2002 tour dates, showing date, city, country, venue, attendance, gross
Date (2002)	City	Country	Venue	Attendance	Gross
2002/2003 New Year's Eve Run
December 31	New York City	United States	Madison Square Garden	18,966 / 18,966	$824,940

=== 2003 ===
For two years, the members of Phish concentrated on outside projects and other musical endeavors. Trey Anastasio worked with the Vermont Youth Orchestra and formed the supergroup Oysterhead, but spent most of 2001 and 2002 working on his solo career. Mike Gordon made two films and an album with guitar legend Leo Kottke. Jon Fishman toured with both the Jazz Mandolin Project and Pork Tornado. Page McConnell formed the electronic trio Vida Blue.

In late 2002, Phish reunited in the Vermont mountains and recorded a new studio album, Round Room, the first Phish album since Lawn Boy in 1990 to feature a number of extended jams. The band soon announced that their hiatus was over and that they would return to the road in 2003, starting with a New Year's Eve concert on December 31, 2002, at Madison Square Garden. The New Year's run was a three-night stand at the Hampton Coliseum in early January.

After appearing on the front cover of Rolling Stone, the band launched their first winter tour of the US since 1993. The tour was only two weeks long. The band launched a US summer tour in July that culminated in another festival in upstate Maine. 60,000 people attended the It festival, which featured seven sets of Phish music over two nights, including a set performed live from the top of an air traffic control tower. A DVD film and PBS special was made to document the festival.

It was the sixth festival hosted by the band. The event took place on August 2 and 3, 2003, at the Loring Air Force Base in Limestone, Maine, just miles from the Canada–U.S. border. 60,000 people attended, resulting in one of the largest Phish concerts ever. This was also their most-played festival venue (see also the Great Went and Lemonwheel). PBS was on hand to make a documentary of the experience.

Phish was the only band at the event, performing seven sets of music over two nights, including an ambient set on top of the air traffic control tower at 2:30 AM after the first night's concert. Fans camped onsite in tents, creating a community of Phans that became one of the largest cities in Maine over the weekend.

Phish played only sporadically after the summer tour, including a brief four-night run in late November/early December to celebrate their 20th anniversary. The third night of the celebration featured an appearance from founding Phish guitarist Jeff Holdsworth, who had not played onstage with Phish in over 17 years. The group closed out the year with a four-night New Year's Eve run in Miami, featuring a surprise appearance from Parliament/Funkadelic.

Original song debuts in 2003 included "Round Room", "Thunderhead", "Mexican Cousin", "Pebbles and Marbles", "Anything But Me", "Seven Below", "Mock Song", "Friday", "Spices", "Scents and Subtle Sounds", "Discern", "Secret Smile", "Two Versions of Me", "Army of One", "Spread it Round", and "Crowd Control."

List of 2003 tour dates, showing date, city, country, venue, attendance, gross
Date (2003)	City	Country	Venue	Attendance	Gross
2002/2003 New Year's Eve Run (continued from 2002)
January 2	Hampton	United States	Hampton Coliseum	41,400 / 41,400	$1,559,173
January 3	Hampton	United States	Hampton Coliseum	41,400 / 41,400	$1,559,173
January 4	Hampton	United States	Hampton Coliseum	41,400 / 41,400	$1,559,173
Winter 2003
February 14	Inglewood	United States	Great Western Forum	17,436 / 17,517	$645,863
February 15	Las Vegas	United States	Thomas & Mack Center	35,905 / 35,905	$1,418,248
February 16	Las Vegas	United States	Thomas & Mack Center	35,905 / 35,905	$1,418,248
February 18	Denver	United States	Pepsi Center	17,767 / 17,767	$666,263
February 20	Rosemont	United States	Allstate Arena	18,355 / 18,355	$688,313
February 21	Cincinnati	United States	U.S. Bank Arena	N/A	
February 22	Cincinnati	United States	U.S. Bank Arena	N/A	
February 24	East Rutherford	United States	Continental Airlines Arena	20,632 / 20,632	$707,764
February 25	Philadelphia	United States	First Union Spectrum	18,332 / 18,332	$679,613
February 26	Worcester	United States	Worcester's Centrum Centre	14,511 / 14,511	$529,575
February 28	Uniondale	United States	Nassau Veterans Memorial Coliseum	17,433 / 17,630	$600,915
March 1	Greensboro	United States	Greensboro Coliseum	23,642 / 23,642	$880,688
Summer 2003
July 7	Phoenix	United States	Cricket Wireless Pavilion	N/A	
July 8	Chula Vista	United States	Coors Amphitheatre	12,235 / 15,000	$532,223
July 9	Mountain View	United States	Shoreline Amphitheatre	N/A	
July 10	Mountain View	United States	Shoreline Amphitheatre	N/A	
July 12	George	United States	The Gorge Amphitheatre	N/A	
July 13	George	United States	The Gorge Amphitheatre	N/A	
July 15	West Valley City	United States	USANA Amphitheatre	N/A	
July 17	Bonner Springs	United States	Verizon Wireless Amphitheater	N/A	
July 18	East Troy	United States	Alpine Valley Music Theatre	55,772 / 70,288	$2,167,243
July 19	East Troy	United States	Alpine Valley Music Theatre	55,772 / 70,288	$2,167,243
July 21	Noblesville	United States	Verizon Wireless Music Center	62,658 / 72,564	$2,455,162
July 22	Noblesville	United States	Verizon Wireless Music Center	62,658 / 72,564	$2,455,162
July 23	Noblesville	United States	Verizon Wireless Music Center	62,658 / 72,564	$2,455,162
July 25	Charlotte	United States	Verizon Wireless Amphitheatre	18,874 / 18,874	$721,856
July 26	Atlanta	United States	HiFi Buys Amphitheatre	18,280 / 18,789	$795,396
July 27	Raleigh	United States	Alltel Pavilion	17,668 / 20,000	$672,465
July 29	Burgettstown	United States	Post-Gazette Pavilion	16,302 / 23,188	$609,808
July 30	Camden	United States	Tweeter Center at the Waterfront	49,504 / 49,940	$1,917,628
July 31	Camden	United States	Tweeter Center at the Waterfront	49,504 / 49,940	$1,917,628
It
August 2	Limestone	United States	Loring Air Force Base	N/A	
August 3	Limestone	United States	Loring Air Force Base	N/A	
2003 20th Anniversary Run
November 28	Uniondale	United States	Nassau Veterans Memorial Coliseum	17,450 / 17,789	$593,021
November 29	Philadelphia	United States	Wachovia Spectrum	18,237 / 18,237	$673,875
December 1	Albany	United States	Pepsi Arena	15,786 / 15,786	$576,189
December 2	Boston	United States	FleetCenter	17,569 / 17,569	$676,360
2003 New Year's Eve Run
December 28	Miami	United States	American Airlines Arena	74,376 / 74,376	$3,063,761
December 29	Miami	United States	American Airlines Arena	74,376 / 74,376	$3,063,761
December 30	Miami	United States	American Airlines Arena	74,376 / 74,376	$3,063,761
December 31	Miami	United States	American Airlines Arena	74,376 / 74,376	$3,063,761
TOTAL				620,124 / 658,091 (94%)	$23,831,402

=== 2004 ===
After a three-night stand in Las Vegas in mid-April, Trey Anastasio announced on the band's website that Phish was officially breaking up for good following a brief summer tour. However, the band continued to debut new material throughout the year, opening their farewell tour with a new song titled "A Song I Heard the Ocean Sing" from their final album Undermind, which was released shortly after the breakup announcement. The tour's opening night was also broadcast in movie theaters across the country and eventually released on DVD and CD as Phish: Live in Brooklyn. The band also debuted another original in Brooklyn titled "Nothing", and the band's final original debut, "Access Me", was unveiled on June 26 at a show in Wisconsin.

On 21 June, Phish appeared on Late Show With David Letterman, performing atop the outside marquee. For the broadcast, Phish performed "Scents And Subtle Sounds" (sans intro) and then they played a short set, featuring truncated versions of several of their songs, for the few hundred fans gathered below.

After a brief run of shows in June (June 18 included an appearance from Jay-Z), the band took most of the summer off before returning for a final week of concerts in August. While the June performances featured an inspired band, eager to put an exclamation point on their career, the August leg of the tour was marred by major crowd-control issues, high emotions, and notoriously sloppy performances.

Coventry was a seventh weekend-long festival hosted by the band and was announced to be the final performances ever by the band. The event took place from August 13 to 15, 2004, at the Newport State Airport in the small town of Coventry, Vermont. An estimated 65,000-68,000 attended. Phish was the only band at the event, performing six sets of music over two nights that were the band's final live performances, until their 2009 reunion. Fans camped on site in tents, creating a community that became the largest city in Vermont over the weekend.

List of 2004 tour dates, showing date, city, country, venue, attendance, gross
Date (2004)	City	Country	Venue	Attendance	Gross
2004 Vegas Run
April 15	Las Vegas	United States	Thomas & Mack Center	53,815 / 53,815	$2,287,138
April 16	Las Vegas	United States	Thomas & Mack Center	53,815 / 53,815	$2,287,138
April 17	Las Vegas	United States	Thomas & Mack Center	53,815 / 53,815	$2,287,138
Early Summer 2004
June 17	Brooklyn	United States	KeySpan Park	N/A	
June 18	Brooklyn	United States	KeySpan Park	N/A	
June 19	Saratoga Springs	United States	Saratoga Performing Arts Center	50,081 / 50,240	$2,082,458
June 20	Saratoga Springs	United States	Saratoga Performing Arts Center	50,081 / 50,240	$2,082,458
June 23	Noblesville	United States	Verizon Wireless Music Center	48,607 / 48,607	$1,902,574
June 24	Noblesville	United States	Verizon Wireless Music Center	48,607 / 48,607	$1,902,574
June 25	East Troy	United States	Alpine Valley Music Theatre	64,969 / 70,093	$2,543,022
June 26	East Troy	United States	Alpine Valley Music Theatre	64,969 / 70,093	$2,543,022
Late Summer 2004
August 9	Hampton	United States	Hampton Coliseum	13,800 / 13,800	$584,242
August 10	Mansfield	United States	Tweeter Center for the Performing Arts	39,820 / 39,820	$1,627,837
August 11	Mansfield	United States	Tweeter Center for the Performing Arts	39,820 / 39,820	$1,627,837
August 12	Camden	United States	Tweeter Center at the Waterfront	25,150 / 25,150	$1,052,810
Coventry
August 13	Coventry	United States	Newport State Airport	N/A	
August 14	Coventry	United States	Newport State Airport	N/A	
August 15	Coventry	United States	Newport State Airport	N/A	
TOTAL				296,242 / 301,366 (98%)	$12,080,081

=== 2009 ===
On October 1, 2008, Phish announced a three-show reunion concert at the Hampton Coliseum in Hampton, Virginia. The shows took place 6–8 March 2009. During the second phase of the band's career, their lack of practice had made it impossible for them to perform the complicated "Fluffhead", much to the chagrin of fans. Fittingly, the first song Phish played upon their return was "Fluffhead", which was met with thunderous applause.

Proving that the Hampton shows were not a one-off, Phish went on to perform fifteen concerts in June 2009, including two days at Bonnaroo Music Festival. The shows kicked off with the band's first ever performance at Boston's Fenway Park and wrapped up at Alpine Valley in East Troy, Wisconsin on June 20–21. During these dates, several new songs were debuted, as the band was working on their eleventh album, Joy. These shows marked a return to song-based performance, as the band initially steered away from extended improvisation. The result would be some of the band's longest setlists since the early 1990s.

On March 17, 2009, Phish announced another dozen dates as a late summer tour, with a four-night stand in Red Rocks Amphitheatre (their first shows there since being banned in 1996), and ending at the Saratoga Performing Arts Center in New York on August 16.

In September, Phish's reunion album, Joy, was released on the band's own label, JEMP Records. Produced by Steve Lillywhite, the album featured the songs that the band had premiered over the course of the summer. A limited edition boxed set version of Joy was packaged with a bonus album called Party Time which featured several outtakes from Joy as well as some older rarities and solo recordings. Several of the songs from this set made it to the Phish stage and eventually this was released as its own vinyl set.

On June 26, 2009, the band announced a "save the date" for a three-day festival on October 30 - November 1. Phish.com contained an animated map of the United States, and individual states were slowly removed from the map, leaving California. Confirming several rumors, the band announced that "Festival 8" would take place at the Empire Polo Fields in Indio, California. The band played eight sets over the three nights, including a musical costume on Halloween, the Rolling Stones's "Exile On Main Street" and an all acoustic set "at the crack of noon" the following day. Before the acoustic set, the crowd was served free coffee and figure-8-shaped donuts. The festival was filmed in HD 3D and portions of the festival were released in movie theaters across the United States as Phish 3D. Members of the band Sharon Jones & the Dap-Kings joined the band on Halloween night to perform a number of songs. "They were just as nervous as we were. When we stepped up there and did the first two songs—the first one was 'Tumbling Dice,' and the other one was 'Sweet Virginia'—Trey looked up at us after we got through the first song and he gave us a wink," Jones said.

On October 9, 2009, Phish announced they would embark on a Fall tour (their first since 2000, just prior to the first hiatus) beginning on November 18 in Detroit, Michigan and concluding on December 5 in Charlottesville, Virginia. This 13-show tour included two-night stands at the U.S. Bank Arena in Cincinnati, Ohio, the Wachovia Center in Philadelphia, Pennsylvania, and Times Union Center in Albany, New York as well as a three-night stand and return to Madison Square Garden (their first shows there since the New Year's Eve 2002 show that ended the first hiatus).

On December 28, 2009, Phish returned to Miami, Florida after six years for four days of music, culminating with New Year's Eve on December 31.

Original songs debuted in 2009 include "Backwards Down the Number Line", "Beauty of a Broken Heart", "Undermind", "Ocelot", "Light", "Time Turns Elastic", "Stealing Time From the Faulty Plan", "Kill Devil Falls", "Twenty Years Later", "Let Me Lie", "Sugar Shack", "Joy", "Alaska", "The Connection", "Windy City", "Party Time", "I Been Around", "Invisible", "Sleep Again", "Tomorrow's Song", and "Gone."

==== Costumes ====
Leading up to Festival 8, the band's festival which took place over the weekend of Halloween, the band's website featured a gallery of various albums which were narrowed down to twelve by the week before the festival.

The entire gallery of costume choices can be accessed here: Festival 8 Countdown

These final eight albums' titles provided the names of the eight campsites on the festival grounds:

- David Bowie – Hunky Dory
- Genesis – The Lamb Lies Down on Broadway
- The Jimi Hendrix Experience – Electric Ladyland
- King Crimson – Larks' Tongues in Aspic
- MGMT – Oracular Spectacular
- Prince – Purple Rain
- Radiohead – Kid A
- The Rolling Stones – Exile on Main St.

On October 31, the only album cover that did not have an axe or a knife through it in the gallery on the website was Exile on Main St., which the band played in its entirety later that night.

List of 2009 tour dates, showing date, city, country, venue, attendance, gross
Date (2009)	City	Country	Venue	Attendance	Gross
2009 Hampton Reunion Run
March 6	Hampton	United States	Hampton Coliseum	N/A	
March 7	Hampton	United States	Hampton Coliseum	N/A	
March 8	Hampton	United States	Hampton Coliseum	N/A	
Early Summer 2009
May 31	Boston	United States	Fenway Park	34,906 / 34,906	$1,710,423
June 2	Wantagh	United States	Nikon at Jones Beach Theater	N/A	
June 4	Wantagh	United States	Nikon at Jones Beach Theater	N/A	
June 5	Wantagh	United States	Nikon at Jones Beach Theater	N/A	
June 6	Mansfield	United States	Comcast Center	N/A	
June 7	Camden	United States	Susquehanna Bank Center	24,958 / 24,958	$1,232,116
June 9	Asheville	United States	Asheville Civic Center	N/A	
June 10	Knoxville	United States	Thompson–Boling Arena	N/A	
June 12	Manchester	United States	Bonnaroo Music and Arts Festival	N/A	
June 14	Manchester	United States	Bonnaroo Music and Arts Festival	N/A	
June 16	St. Louis	United States	Fox Theatre	N/A	
June 18	Burgettstown	United States	Post-Gazette Pavilion	23,064 / 23,070	$1,137,263
June 19	Noblesville	United States	Verizon Wireless Music Center	24,502 / 24,502	$1,089,480
June 20	East Troy	United States	Alpine Valley Music Theatre	69,731 / 69,772	$3,431,192
June 21	East Troy	United States	Alpine Valley Music Theatre	69,731 / 69,772	$3,431,192
Late Summer 2009
July 30	Morrison	United States	Red Rocks Amphitheatre	N/A	
July 31	Morrison	United States	Red Rocks Amphitheatre	N/A	
August 1	Morrison	United States	Red Rocks Amphitheatre	N/A	
August 2	Morrison	United States	Red Rocks Amphitheatre	N/A	
August 5	Mountain View	United States	Shoreline Amphitheatre	22,021 / 22,021	$945,183
August 7	George	United States	The Gorge Amphitheatre	43,437 / 44,000	$2,147,756
August 8	George	United States	The Gorge Amphitheatre	43,437 / 44,000	$2,147,756
August 11	Bridgeview	United States	Toyota Park	30,303 / 30,303	$1,409,090
August 13	Darien Center	United States	Darien Lake Performing Arts Center	21,773 / 21,773	$1,072,764
August 14	Hartford	United States	Comcast Theatre	24,087 / 24,087	$985,810
August 15	Columbia	United States	Merriweather Post Pavilion	19,000 / 19,000	$935,798
August 16	Saratoga Springs	United States	Saratoga Performing Arts Center	25,234 / 25,234	$1,246,658
Festival 8
October 30	Indio	United States	Empire Polo Club	N/A	
October 31	Indio	United States	Empire Polo Club	N/A	
November 1	Indio	United States	Empire Polo Club	N/A	
Fall 2009
November 18	Detroit	United States	Cobo Arena	10,519 / 11,561	$523,850
November 20	Cincinnati	United States	U.S. Bank Arena	N/A	
November 21	Cincinnati	United States	U.S. Bank Arena	N/A	
November 22	Syracuse	United States	War Memorial at Oncenter	N/A	
November 24	Philadelphia	United States	Wachovia Center	N/A	
November 25	Philadelphia	United States	Wachovia Center	N/A	
November 27	Albany	United States	Times Union Center	30,883 / 30,883	$1,481,952
November 28	Albany	United States	Times Union Center	30,883 / 30,883	$1,481,952
November 29	Portland	United States	Cumberland County Civic Center	N/A	
December 2	New York City	United States	Madison Square Garden	55,700 / 55,700	$2,532,237
December 3	New York City	United States	Madison Square Garden	55,700 / 55,700	$2,532,237
December 4	New York City	United States	Madison Square Garden	55,700 / 55,700	$2,532,237
December 5	Charlottesville	United States	John Paul Jones Arena	13,963 / 13,974	$669,408
2009 New Year's Eve Run
December 28	Miami	United States	American Airlines Arena	N/A	
December 29	Miami	United States	American Airlines Arena	N/A	
December 30	Miami	United States	American Airlines Arena	N/A	
December 31	Miami	United States	American Airlines Arena	N/A	
TOTAL				474,081 / 475,744 (99%)	$22,550,980

== 2010s ==
=== 2010 ===
On 15 March, Trey Anastasio inducted Genesis into the Rock and Roll Hall of Fame. Genesis did not perform, so Phish played in their honor, taking on "Watcher of the Skies" and "No Reply At All", the latter featuring a horn section. This occasion was the only instance of Phish performing these songs.

On 13 May, Phish appeared on Late Night With Jimmy Fallon, who was devoting a week to artists covering songs from Exile On Main Street. Phish performed "Loving Cup" as well as their own "Kill Devil Falls".

In Spring 2010, Phish announced a 29-date summer tour. It consisted of a return to Chicago, Hartford, Saratoga, Columbia, Noblesville, East Troy, Jones Beach, and Mansfield. They also played two shows at Town Park in Telluride, Colorado. That followed a three-night run at The Greek Theater in Berkeley, California. It was Phish's first time back there since 1993.

Phish played a two-hour set at the Austin City Limits festival in Austin, Texas this October.

In the fall, Phish played a 14-date tour. The tour started with a three-night run in Broomfield, Colorado, followed by two shows in North Charleston, South Carolina. On the release date of Mike Gordon's new solo album Moss, Phish played The Augusta Civic Center in Maine. The smallest venue played on the tour was The Utica Memorial Auditorium in Utica, New York. Then for the first time since 1999 they made a return to Providence, Rhode Island. Then north to Amherst, Massachusetts, the band played two nights at the UMASS Mullins Center, which was the first time back since 1995. Then to finish the tour was one show in Manchester NH, first time back since 1994 and then a sold-out three-night Halloween Run at Boardwalk Hall in Atlantic City.

The New Year's run was announced as a five-date tour starting with two shows in Worcester, Massachusetts, then a three-night sold-out run at Madison Square Garden on 12/30, 12/31, 1/1/11.

Songs debuted this year include "Show Of Life", "Idea", "Summer Of '89", "Halfway To The Moon", "Dr. Gabel", "Pigtail", "The Birdwatcher", and "Burn That Bridge".

==== Costumes ====
On Halloween night 2010, Phish chose Little Feat's 1978 live album Waiting for Columbus.

List of 2010 tour dates, showing date, city, country, venue, attendance, gross
Date (2010–11)	City	Country	Venue	Attendance	Gross
Early Summer 2010
June 11	Bridgeview	United States	Toyota Park	22,293 / 22,293	$1,036,625
June 12	Cuyahoga Falls	United States	Blossom Music Center	14,726 / 20,351	$736,300
June 13	Hershey	United States	Hersheypark Stadium	14,261 / 30,223	$713,050
June 15	Portsmouth	United States	nTelos Wireless Pavilion	N/A	
June 17	Hartford	United States	Comcast Theatre	32,610 / 49,608	$1,900,500
June 18	Hartford	United States	Comcast Theatre	32,610 / 49,608	$1,900,500
June 19	Saratoga Springs	United States	Saratoga Performing Arts Center	45,176 / 50,157	$2,258,800
June 20	Saratoga Springs	United States	Saratoga Performing Arts Center	45,176 / 50,157	$2,258,800
June 22	Mansfield	United States	Comcast Center	19,729 / 19,729	$986,450
June 24	Camden	United States	Susquehanna Bank Center	37,247 / 49,440	$1,965,934
June 25	Camden	United States	Susquehanna Bank Center	37,247 / 49,440	$1,965,934
June 26	Columbia	United States	Merriweather Post Pavilion	30,449 / 38,000	$1,522,450
June 27	Columbia	United States	Merriweather Post Pavilion	30,449 / 38,000	$1,522,450
June 29	Canandaigua	United States	Constellation Brands – Marvin Sands Performing Arts Center	12,633 / 15,000	$631,500
July 1	Raleigh	United States	Time Warner Cable Music Pavilion at Walnut Creek	12,594 / 20,000	$629,700
July 2	Charlotte	United States	Verizon Wireless Amphitheatre	15,339 / 18,812	$766,950
July 3	Alpharetta	United States	Verizon Wireless Amphitheatre at Encore Park	25,574 / 25,574	$1,278,700
July 4	Alpharetta	United States	Verizon Wireless Amphitheatre at Encore Park	25,574 / 25,574	$1,278,700
Late Summer 2010
August 5	Berkeley	United States	William Randolph Hearst Greek Theatre	26,016 / 26,016	$1,300,800
August 6	Berkeley	United States	William Randolph Hearst Greek Theatre	26,016 / 26,016	$1,300,800
August 7	Berkeley	United States	William Randolph Hearst Greek Theatre	26,016 / 26,016	$1,300,800
August 9	Telluride	United States	Telluride Town Park	10,011 / 10,011	$859,950
August 10	Telluride	United States	Telluride Town Park	10,011 / 10,011	$859,950
August 12	Noblesville	United States	Verizon Wireless Music Center	35,801 / 48,820	$1,790,050
August 13	Noblesville	United States	Verizon Wireless Music Center	35,801 / 48,820	$1,790,050
August 14	East Troy	United States	Alpine Valley Music Theatre	42,434 / 70,872	$2,121,700
August 15	East Troy	United States	Alpine Valley Music Theatre	42,434 / 70,872	$2,121,700
August 17	Wantagh	United States	Nikon at Jones Beach Theater	28,146 / 28,146	$1,407,300
August 18	Wantagh	United States	Nikon at Jones Beach Theater	28,146 / 28,146	$1,407,300
Fall 2010
October 8	Austin	United States	Austin City Limits Music Festival	N/A	
October 10	Broomfield	United States	1stBank Center	N/A	
October 11	Broomfield	United States	1stBank Center	N/A	
October 12	Broomfield	United States	1stBank Center	N/A	
October 15	North Charleston	United States	North Charleston Coliseum	24,018 / 24,954	$1,441,080
October 16	North Charleston	United States	North Charleston Coliseum	24,018 / 24,954	$1,441,080
October 19	Augusta	United States	Augusta Civic Center	N/A	
October 20	Utica	United States	Utica Memorial Auditorium	N/A	
October 22	Providence	United States	Dunkin' Donuts Center	N/A	
October 23	Amherst	United States	William D. Mullins Memorial Center	19,355 / 19,355	$1,161,300
October 24	Amherst	United States	William D. Mullins Memorial Center	19,355 / 19,355	$1,161,300
October 26	Manchester	United States	Verizon Wireless Arena	N/A	
October 29	Atlantic City	United States	Boardwalk Hall	42,240 / 42,240	$2,534,400
October 30	Atlantic City	United States	Boardwalk Hall	42,240 / 42,240	$2,534,400
October 31	Atlantic City	United States	Boardwalk Hall	42,240 / 42,240	$2,534,400
2010/2011 New Year's Eve Run
December 27	Worcester	United States	DCU Center	25,324 / 26,942	$1,519,440
December 28	Worcester	United States	DCU Center	25,324 / 26,942	$1,519,440
December 30	New York City	United States	Madison Square Garden	55,710 / 55,710	$3,528,260
December 31	New York City	United States	Madison Square Garden	55,710 / 55,710	$3,528,260
January 1	New York City	United States	Madison Square Garden	55,710 / 55,710	$3,528,260
TOTAL				591,686 / 712,253 (83%)	$32,091,239

=== 2011 ===
The first leg of the Summer 2011 tour was announced in February with more dates announced in April. It began in late May with a three-night run in Bethel and moved on to visit Holmdel for two nights, Clarkston, Cuyahoga Falls, Cincinnati, Mansfield, Darien Center, Camden, 2 nights in Columbia, 2 nights in Alpharetta, Charlotte, Raleigh, and Portsmouth.

Super Ball IX took place at the Watkins Glen International in Watkins Glen, New York on July 1–3, 2011. It was the first concert to take place at Watkins Glen International since Summer Jam at Watkins Glen in 1973. Seven official sets were played throughout the weekend on the festival's main stage. In addition to the official sets, one additional set featuring ambient, avant-garde music similar to the IT Festival Tower Jam was performed. The set was played late Saturday evening from a partially hidden stage contained in a self-storage building that had been constructed as a piece of the festival's various art installations. The second leg of the 2011 Summer tour was centered around the west coast. Its shows included a two-night run in at the Gorge Amphitheatre in George, Phish's first show at the Hollywood Bowl in Los Angeles, and a two-night run at Harveys Outdoor Arena in Stateline.

Phish played two sets at the Outside Lands Music and Arts Festival in Golden Gate Park in San Francisco.

The band closed the summer with three-night runs at the UIC Pavilion in Chicago, and Dick's Sporting Goods Park in Commerce City over Labor Day Weekend, the latter of which would become a longstanding tradition. Another tradition regarding the Dick's shows, at least for the first few years, was the band's playfulness with at least one of the setlists during the run. In this particular case, every song the band performed on 2 September began with the letter "S".

Phish's home state of Vermont suffered much destruction from flooding after Hurricane Irene made landfall in the northeast. Phish paid tribute by performing a special show on 14 September, in Essex Junction at the Champlain Valley Exposition. All of the money raised from the event went to relief efforts for the state. The show featured a special appearance from Vermont's Governor, Peter Shumlin.

The year for the band closed with a four-night New Year's run at Madison Square Garden on December 28, 29, 30, and 31.

Songs debuted this year include "Steam", "Susskind Hotel", and "Babylon Baby".

List of 2011 tour dates, showing date, city, country, venue, attendance
Date (2011)	City	Country	Venue
Early Summer 2011
May 27	Bethel	United States	Bethel Woods Center for the Arts
May 28	Bethel	United States	Bethel Woods Center for the Arts
May 29	Bethel	United States	Bethel Woods Center for the Arts
May 31	Holmdel	United States	PNC Bank Arts Center
June 1	Holmdel	United States	PNC Bank Arts Center
June 3	Clarkston	United States	DTE Energy Music Theatre
June 4	Cuyahoga Falls	United States	Blossom Music Center
June 5	Cincinnati	United States	Riverbend Music Center
June 7	Mansfield	United States	Comcast Center
June 8	Darien Center	United States	Darien Lake Performing Arts Center
June 10	Camden	United States	Susquehanna Bank Center
June 11	Columbia	United States	Merriweather Post Pavilion
June 12	Columbia	United States	Merriweather Post Pavilion
June 14	Alpharetta	United States	Verizon Wireless Amphitheatre at Encore Park
June 15	Alpharetta	United States	Verizon Wireless Amphitheatre at Encore Park
June 17	Charlotte	United States	Verizon Wireless Amphitheatre
June 18	Raleigh	United States	Time Warner Cable Music Pavilion at Walnut Creek
June 19	Portsmouth	United States	nTelos Wireless Pavilion
Super Ball IX
July 1	Watkins Glen	United States	Watkins Glen International
July 2	Watkins Glen	United States	Watkins Glen International
July 3	Watkins Glen	United States	Watkins Glen International
Late Summer 2011
August 5	George	United States	The Gorge Amphitheatre
August 6	George	United States	The Gorge Amphitheatre
August 8	Los Angeles	United States	Hollywood Bowl
August 9	Stateline	United States	Harveys Outdoor Arena
August 10	Stateline	United States	Harveys Outdoor Arena
August 12	San Francisco	United States	Outside Lands Music and Arts Festival
August 15	Chicago	United States	UIC Pavilion
August 16	Chicago	United States	UIC Pavilion
August 17	Chicago	United States	UIC Pavilion
September 2	Commerce City	United States	Dick's Sporting Goods Park
September 3	Commerce City	United States	Dick's Sporting Goods Park
September 4	Commerce City	United States	Dick's Sporting Goods Park
Benefit for Vermont flood recovery
September 14	Essex Junction	United States	Champlain Valley Exposition
2011 New Year's Eve Run
December 28	New York City	United States	Madison Square Garden
December 29	New York City	United States	Madison Square Garden
December 30	New York City	United States	Madison Square Garden
December 31	New York City	United States	Madison Square Garden

==== Box office score data ====
List of box office score data with date, city, venue, attendance, gross
Date (2011)	City	Venue	Attendance	Gross
June 3	Clarkston, United States	DTE Energy Music Theatre	11,233 / 15,274	$557,283
August 9	Stateline, United States	Harveys Outdoor Arena	17,221 / 17,221	$861,050
August 10	Stateline, United States	Harveys Outdoor Arena	17,221 / 17,221	$861,050
August 15	Chicago, United States	UIC Pavilion	27,476 / 27,476	$1,593,608
August 16	Chicago, United States	UIC Pavilion	27,476 / 27,476	$1,593,608
August 17	Chicago, United States	UIC Pavilion	27,476 / 27,476	$1,593,608
December 28	New York City, United States	Madison Square Garden	75,707 / 75,707	$4,387,679
December 29	New York City, United States	Madison Square Garden	75,707 / 75,707	$4,387,679
December 30	New York City, United States	Madison Square Garden	75,707 / 75,707	$4,387,679
December 31	New York City, United States	Madison Square Garden	75,707 / 75,707	$4,387,679
TOTAL			131,637 / 135,678 (97%)	$7,399,620

=== 2012 ===
Phish took most of 2012 to focus on other activities and limited the band's touring to two summer legs and a New Year's run.

The first summer leg ran from early June through early July and focused on the east coast, including stops at Bonnaroo Music and Arts Festival and three nights at Bader Field, in Atlantic City. Other dates include two nights in Portsmouth, Cincinnati, Burgettstown, Cuyahoga Falls, two dates in Noblesville, two nights in East Troy, a two-night Fourth of July run in Wantagh, and three nights in Saratoga Springs.

The second portion of the tour ventured away from the northeast with dates in Long Beach, three nights in San Francisco, Kansas City, Pelham, Atlanta, Charlotte, St. Louis, Oklahoma City (Phish's first performance in Oklahoma), and another three-night run over Labor Day Weekend at Dick's Sporting Goods Park in Commerce City. In keeping with the playful setlist tradition, the first letter of each song played at the 31 August show spelled out "Fuck Your Face", before the band ended the second set with the song of the same name.

There were no Phish shows played in the fall, so the next shows were a four-night New Year's run at Madison Square Garden, the culmination of which involved a golf theme (in honor of Page's impending 50th birthday, the joke being that he would retire to the golf course), including an onstage driving range (where the band and crew would launch commemorative golf balls into the crowd), a live runaway golf cart marathon on stage, and several songs in the third set that utilize golf terminology, such as "Iron Man", "Fly Like An Eagle", "Sand", "The Wedge", and "Driver", among others.

This year is uncharacteristic in that no new original material was debuted on stage.

List of 2012 tour dates, showing date, city, country, venue, attendance, gross
Date (2012)	City	Country	Venue	Attendance	Gross
Early Summer 2012
June 7	Worcester	United States	DCU Center	25,346 / 28,666	$1,520,760
June 8	Worcester	United States	DCU Center	25,346 / 28,666	$1,520,760
June 10	Manchester	United States	Bonnaroo Music and Arts Festival	N/A	
June 15	Atlantic City	United States	Bader Field	N/A	
June 16	Atlantic City	United States	Bader Field	N/A	
June 17	Atlantic City	United States	Bader Field	N/A	
June 19	Portsmouth	United States	nTelos Wireless Pavilion	13,780 / 13,780	$827,400
June 20	Portsmouth	United States	nTelos Wireless Pavilion	13,780 / 13,780	$827,400
June 22	Cincinnati	United States	Riverbend Music Center	11,075 / 20,500	$581,400
June 23	Burgettstown	United States	First Niagara Pavilion	12,925 / 23,085	$683,220
June 24	Cuyahoga Falls	United States	Blossom Music Center	11,220 / 20,551	$595,305
June 28	Noblesville	United States	Klipsch Music Center	25,759 / 50,000	$1,343,265
June 29	Noblesville	United States	Klipsch Music Center	25,759 / 50,000	$1,343,265
June 30	East Troy	United States	Alpine Valley Music Theatre	35,223 / 71,200	$1,811,415
July 1	East Troy	United States	Alpine Valley Music Theatre	35,223 / 71,200	$1,811,415
July 3	Wantagh	United States	Nikon at Jones Beach Theater	28,556 / 28,556	$1,713,360
July 4	Wantagh	United States	Nikon at Jones Beach Theater	28,556 / 28,556	$1,713,360
July 6	Saratoga Springs	United States	Saratoga Performing Arts Center	62,354 / 75,000	$3,040,815
July 7	Saratoga Springs	United States	Saratoga Performing Arts Center	62,354 / 75,000	$3,040,815
July 8	Saratoga Springs	United States	Saratoga Performing Arts Center	62,354 / 75,000	$3,040,815
Late Summer 2012
August 15	Long Beach	United States	Long Beach Arena	13,121 / 13,121	$787,260
August 17	San Francisco	United States	Bill Graham Civic Auditorium	26,259 / 26,259	$1,575,540
August 18	San Francisco	United States	Bill Graham Civic Auditorium	26,259 / 26,259	$1,575,540
August 19	San Francisco	United States	Bill Graham Civic Auditorium	26,259 / 26,259	$1,575,540
August 22	Kansas City	United States	Starlight Theatre	7,414 / 7,414	$444,840
August 24	Pelham	United States	Oak Mountain Amphitheatre	10,345 / 10,345	$567,630
August 25	Atlanta	United States	Aaron's Amphitheatre at Lakewood	18,793 / 18,793	$950,565
August 26	Charlotte	United States	Verizon Wireless Amphitheatre	13,296 / 18,812	$711,915
August 28	St. Louis	United States	Chaifetz Arena	7,425 / 9,978	$445,500
August 29	Oklahoma City	United States	Zoo Amphitheatre	6,474 / 9,500	$388,505
August 31	Commerce City	United States	Dick's Sporting Goods Park	60,124 / 73,533	$3,355,628
September 1	Commerce City	United States	Dick's Sporting Goods Park	60,124 / 73,533	$3,355,628
September 2	Commerce City	United States	Dick's Sporting Goods Park	60,124 / 73,533	$3,355,628
2012 New Year's Eve Run
December 28	New York City	United States	Madison Square Garden	73,569 / 73,569	$4,594,270
December 29	New York City	United States	Madison Square Garden	73,569 / 73,569	$4,594,270
December 30	New York City	United States	Madison Square Garden	73,569 / 73,569	$4,594,270
December 31	New York City	United States	Madison Square Garden	73,569 / 73,569	$4,594,270
TOTAL				463,058 / 592,662 (78%)	$25,938,593

=== 2013 ===
2013 featured no touring until July, as the band was in the studio writing and rehearsing the material that would eventually become their next album. The entire tour routing of Summer 2013 was announced in March. The first show of the year featured the band's first performance at the Waterfront Pavilion in Bangor, Maine. On the heels of this opening show was a three-night run at the Saratoga Performing Arts Center in Saratoga Springs, New York. The tour was scheduled to continue with the band's first performance in Canada in thirteen years, at the Molson Canadian Amphitheatre in Toronto, however an abnormal amount of rainfall the day prior to the show forced the band to postpone, citing lack of power and public access to the venue. The routing continued onto Holmdel, New Jersey, Wantagh, New York, two performances in Columbia, Maryland, two performances in Alpharetta, Georgia, three performances at the Charter One Pavilion in Chicago, two performances at The Gorge Amphitheatre in Washington, two shows in Stateline, Nevada along Lake Tahoe, three shows in the Bill Graham Civic Auditorium in San Francisco, California, and a show at the Hollywood Bowl in Los Angeles.

After the show in Los Angeles, the band took a monthlong break before returning to the stage for their third annual three-night run at Dick's Sporting Goods Park in Commerce City, Colorado over Labor Day Weekend. Continuing with the playful setlists, the first night at Dick's featured a setlist where the first letter of each song, when read in reverse order, spelled "Most Shows Spell Something".

Phish returned to the road for a Fall tour that kicked off with three shows at Hampton Coliseum and then moved its way up the east coast before settling in Atlantic City for a three-night affair at Boardwalk Hall that included the band's seventh Halloween show to feature a musical costume.

Rather than covering another band on Halloween, however, Phish chose to perform the entirety of its own forthcoming album (at the time it was known as Wingsuit) before going into the studio to record it in November. None of this material had been performed by Phish prior to this date, with only "Winterqueen" having been played by Trey's solo band. Most of this material, along with other songs, became the band's Bob Ezrin-produced 12th studio album, Fuego, released in 2014.

Phish capped off 2013 with a four-show run at Madison Square Garden that led up to a New Year's Eve performance that celebrated the band's 30th anniversary. The second set featured the band performing on top of a replica of their first van, adorned with the JEMP logo, which was driven into the middle of the venue floor. Using hockey sticks for mic stands (a nod to their first-ever show), Phish performed a set of songs that dated from their early touring years (no songs newer than 1991 were played in this set). Video montages were screened during the evening and, at one point, cake was served.

Songs debuted this year include "Yarmouth Road", "Architect", "Frost", "Say Something", "Wingsuit", "Fuego", "The Line", "Sing Monica", "Waiting All Night", "Wombat", "Snow", "Devotion To A Dream", "555", "Winterqueen", "Amidst The Peals Of Laughter", and "You Never Know".

List of 2013 tour dates, showing date, city, country, venue, attendance, gross
Date (2013)	City	Country	Venue	Attendance	Gross
Summer 2013
July 3	Bangor	United States	Darling's Waterfront Pavilion	13,977 / 16,000	$840,455
July 5	Saratoga Springs	United States	Saratoga Performing Arts Center	66,695 / 77,867	$2,324,855
July 6	Saratoga Springs	United States	Saratoga Performing Arts Center	66,695 / 77,867	$2,324,855
July 7	Saratoga Springs	United States	Saratoga Performing Arts Center	66,695 / 77,867	$2,324,855
July 10	Holmdel Township	United States	PNC Bank Arts Center	16,720 / 16,907	$847,395
July 12	Wantagh	United States	Nikon at Jones Beach Theater	14,252 / 14,252	$855,120
July 13	Columbia	United States	Merriweather Post Pavilion	35,103 / 39,124	$1,741,095
July 14	Columbia	United States	Merriweather Post Pavilion	35,103 / 39,124	$1,741,095
July 16	Alpharetta	United States	Verizon Wireless Amphitheatre at Encore Park	23,245 / 26,000	$1,266,060
July 17	Alpharetta	United States	Verizon Wireless Amphitheatre at Encore Park	23,245 / 26,000	$1,266,060
July 19	Chicago	United States	Charter One Pavilion	67,238 / 78,002	$3,200,445
July 20	Chicago	United States	Charter One Pavilion	67,238 / 78,002	$3,200,445
July 21	Chicago	United States	Charter One Pavilion	67,238 / 78,002	$3,200,445
July 22	Toronto	Canada	Molson Canadian Amphitheatre	10,043 / 16,360	$526,835
July 26	George	United States	The Gorge Amphitheatre	31,762 / 44,000	$1,661,840
July 27	George	United States	The Gorge Amphitheatre	31,762 / 44,000	$1,661,840
July 30	Stateline	United States	Harveys Outdoor Arena	17,644 / 17,644	$1,058,935
July 31	Stateline	United States	Harveys Outdoor Arena	17,644 / 17,644	$1,058,935
August 2	San Francisco	United States	Bill Graham Civic Auditorium	26,288 / 26,288	$1,577,280
August 3	San Francisco	United States	Bill Graham Civic Auditorium	26,288 / 26,288	$1,577,280
August 4	San Francisco	United States	Bill Graham Civic Auditorium	26,288 / 26,288	$1,577,280
August 5	Los Angeles	United States	Hollywood Bowl	17,223 / 17,223	$962,850
August 30	Commerce City	United States	Dick's Sporting Goods Park	68,794 / 72,856	$3,788,980
August 31	Commerce City	United States	Dick's Sporting Goods Park	68,794 / 72,856	$3,788,980
September 1	Commerce City	United States	Dick's Sporting Goods Park	68,794 / 72,856	$3,788,980
Fall 2013
October 18	Hampton	United States	Hampton Coliseum	40,035 / 40,035	$2,481,180
October 19	Hampton	United States	Hampton Coliseum	40,035 / 40,035	$2,481,180
October 20	Hampton	United States	Hampton Coliseum	40,035 / 40,035	$2,481,180
October 22	Rochester	United States	The Blue Cross Arena at the War Memorial	11,244 / 14,000	$730,860
October 23	Glens Falls	United States	Glens Falls Civic Center	7,220 / 7,220	$469,300
October 25	Worcester	United States	DCU Center	27,440 / 27,440	$1,724,930
October 26	Worcester	United States	DCU Center	27,440 / 27,440	$1,724,930
October 27	Hartford	United States	XL Center	12,275 / 15,844	$748,775
October 29	Reading	United States	Santander Arena	8,821 / 8,821	$573,365
October 31	Atlantic City	United States	Boardwalk Hall	42,219 / 42,219	$2,621,845
November 1	Atlantic City	United States	Boardwalk Hall	42,219 / 42,219	$2,621,845
November 2	Atlantic City	United States	Boardwalk Hall	42,219 / 42,219	$2,621,845
2013 New Year's Eve Run
December 28	New York City	United States	Madison Square Garden	76,000 / 76,000	$4,820,030
December 29	New York City	United States	Madison Square Garden	76,000 / 76,000	$4,820,030
December 30	New York City	United States	Madison Square Garden	76,000 / 76,000	$4,820,030
December 31	New York City	United States	Madison Square Garden	76,000 / 76,000	$4,820,030
TOTAL				634,238 / 694,102 (91%)	$34,842,430

=== 2014 ===
April 2014 saw Phish return to the New Orleans Jazz & Heritage Festival for a headlining performance.

Phish's 12th studio album, Fuego, was released on 24 June. That same day, the band appeared on Late Show with David Letterman where they performed "The Line" as well as an additional full set of songs that was later broadcast on the web series Live on Letterman.

The majority of July and August found the band on the road, performing multi-night stops in Saratoga Springs, Philadelphia, Columbia MD, Portsmouth VA, New York's Randalls Island, and Northerly Island in Chicago, as well as several single-night stops, before winding it all up at their annual three-night stand at Dick's Sporting Goods Park, in Commerce City CO.

Continuing their tradition of performing a crafty setlist at the Dick's shows, the first ten songs of the first night's set spelled out "Lushington", which is a title of a very short-lived Phish song from the 1980s, one that has not been played since, and one that has gained almost mythical status. Earlier that year, Rolling Stone conducted a reader's poll to rank the Phish songs in order and there was a fan campaign to stuff the ballot box for "Lushington", in hopes that perhaps the band would play it. The campaign worked and the song appeared in the #1 slot, despite it being one of the most obscure songs in their catalogue. Upon the setlist spelling out the song title, it was expected that the band would perform the song, however, they continued on with "Ha Ha Ha" instead. To date, "Lushington" remains on the shelf.

Phish returned to the road in October, playing a series of shows that concluded with a three-night Halloween run in Las Vegas. For their musical costume this year, Phish utilized the 1964 Disney sound-effects album Chilling, Thrilling Sounds of the Haunted House as the basis for an elaborate stage show that featured several new instrumental songs, a graveyard-themed stage set, dancing zombies, a narrating crypt-keeper named "Esther", and a haunted house, inside of which they performed the first two numbers before "exploding" to reveal the four members of Phish in white tuxedoes and zombie makeup. That this all occurred between two otherwise normal Phish sets, in their normal clothes and without the stage props or even a word of acknowledgement, made this set even more of a shock and this is routinely considered one of the band's greatest achievements. Several of the instrumentals as well as the sound effects from this show became fixtures of the band's live rotation, most notably "Martian Monster", "Your Pet Cat", and "The Dogs".

The Vegas run concluded on 2 November, which was also the last date of the fall tour. The band capped off 2014 with a New Year's run in Miami, this time commencing on New Year's Eve.

Songs debuted this year include "Plasma", "The Haunted House", "The Very Long Fuse", "The Dogs", "Timber", "Your Pet Cat", "Shipwreck", "Chinese Water Torture", "The Birds", and "Martian Monster".

List of 2014 tour dates, showing date, city, country, venue, attendance, gross
Date (2014)	City	Country	Venue	Attendance	Gross
Spring 2014
April 26	New Orleans	United States	New Orleans Jazz & Heritage Festival	N/A	
Summer 2014
July 1	Mansfield	United States	Xfinity Center	17,387 / 19,900	$971,325
July 3	Saratoga Springs	United States	Saratoga Performing Arts Center	52,730 / 75,759	$2,602,185
July 4	Saratoga Springs	United States	Saratoga Performing Arts Center	52,730 / 75,759	$2,602,185
July 5	Saratoga Springs	United States	Saratoga Performing Arts Center	52,730 / 75,759	$2,602,185
July 8	Philadelphia	United States	Mann Center for the Performing Arts	24,804 / 25,000	$1,308,840
July 9	Philadelphia	United States	Mann Center for the Performing Arts	24,804 / 25,000	$1,308,840
July 11	New York City	United States	Randall's Island	55,372 / 90,000	$3,062,580
July 12	New York City	United States	Randall's Island	55,372 / 90,000	$3,062,580
July 13	New York City	United States	Randall's Island	55,372 / 90,000	$3,062,580
July 15	Canandaigua	United States	Constellation Brands – Marvin Sands Performing Arts Center	10,318 / 14,772	$534,630
July 16	Clarkston	United States	DTE Energy Music Theatre	6,949 / 15,008	$525,345
July 18	Chicago	United States	FirstMerit Bank Pavilion	53,056 / 78,000	$2,690,820
July 19	Chicago	United States	FirstMerit Bank Pavilion	53,056 / 78,000	$2,690,820
July 20	Chicago	United States	FirstMerit Bank Pavilion	53,056 / 78,000	$2,690,820
July 25	Charlotte	United States	PNC Music Pavilion	12,508 / 18,858	$685,785
July 26	Columbia	United States	Merriweather Post Pavilion	32,911 / 38,000	$1,646,355
July 27	Columbia	United States	Merriweather Post Pavilion	32,911 / 38,000	$1,646,355
July 29	Portsmouth	United States	nTelos Wireless Pavilion	13,211 / 14,000	$792,660
July 30	Portsmouth	United States	nTelos Wireless Pavilion	13,211 / 14,000	$792,660
August 1	Orange Beach	United States	The Amphitheater at the Wharf	N/A	
August 2	Pelham	United States	Oak Mountain Amphitheatre	10,216 / 10,291	$561,015
August 3	Alpharetta	United States	Verizon Wireless Amphitheatre at Encore Park	12,773 / 13,000	$685,605
August 29	Commerce City	United States	Dick's Sporting Goods Park	69,730 / 74,268	$3,842,673
August 30	Commerce City	United States	Dick's Sporting Goods Park	69,730 / 74,268	$3,842,673
August 31	Commerce City	United States	Dick's Sporting Goods Park	69,730 / 74,268	$3,842,673
Fall 2014
October 17	Eugene	United States	Matthew Knight Arena	11,147 / 11,147	$668,820
October 18	Seattle	United States	KeyArena at Seattle Center	12,787 / 12,787	$701,610
October 21	Santa Barbara	United States	Santa Barbara Bowl	9,887 / 9,887	$581,445
October 22	Santa Barbara	United States	Santa Barbara Bowl	9,887 / 9,887	$581,445
October 24	Inglewood	United States	The Forum	11,621 / 14,441	$671,910
October 25	Chula Vista	United States	Sleep Train Amphitheatre	9,493 / 9,493	$520,545
October 27	San Francisco	United States	Bill Graham Civic Auditorium	26,174 / 26,174	$1,570,440
October 28	San Francisco	United States	Bill Graham Civic Auditorium	26,174 / 26,174	$1,570,440
October 29	San Francisco	United States	Bill Graham Civic Auditorium	26,174 / 26,174	$1,570,440
October 31	Las Vegas	United States	MGM Grand Garden Arena	50,142 / 50,142	$3,006,520
November 1	Las Vegas	United States	MGM Grand Garden Arena	50,142 / 50,142	$3,006,520
November 2	Las Vegas	United States	MGM Grand Garden Arena	50,142 / 50,142	$3,006,520
New Year's Eve 2014
December 31	Miami	United States	AmericanAirlines Arena	N/A	
TOTAL				503,216 / 620,927 (81%)	$27,631,108

=== 2015 ===
2015 kicked off with the last three shows of a four-show New Year's run in Miami.

On March 18, 2015, Phish announced their tenth festival, named Magnaball. The festival was once again held at Watkins Glen International in Watkins Glen, New York, and took place August 21–23, 2015. Seven official sets of music were played over three nights. An additional set was played late Saturday night behind a large drive-in movie screen installed on the back of the race track's bleachers. This set featured ambient music and projections on the screen with live videos of the band superimposed. The event's sound check was publicly broadcast.

For the fifth year in a row, Phish returned to Dick's Sporting Goods Park, in Commerce City CO, for a three-night Labor Day run. Continuing the tradition of performing a clever setlist, the songs from the extended encore on the third night spelled out "Thank You". While the band would continue their Dick's run in the years that followed, this was the last occurrence of the setlist tradition.

After taking the autumn off, Phish reconvened at Madison Square Garden for a four-night Holiday Run that began on 30 December and concluded on 2 January 2016.

Songs debuted this year include "Shade", "No Men In No Man's Land", "Blaze On", "How Many People Are You", "Scabbard", "Heavy Rotation", "Mercury", "The Last Step", and "Can't Always Listen".

List of 2015 tour dates, showing date, city, country, venue, attendance, gross
Date (2015)	City	Country	Venue	Attendance	Gross
New Year's Eve 2014 (continued from 2014)
January 1	Miami	United States	AmericanAirlines Arena	N/A	
January 2	Miami	United States	AmericanAirlines Arena	N/A	
January 3	Miami	United States	AmericanAirlines Arena	N/A	
Summer 2015
July 21	Bend	United States	Les Schwab Amphitheater	15,999 / 15,999	$1,039,935
July 22	Bend	United States	Les Schwab Amphitheater	15,999 / 15,999	$1,039,935
July 24	Mountain View	United States	Shoreline Amphitheatre	15,173 / 22,000	$805,845
July 25	Inglewood	United States	The Forum	12,388 / 14,550	$715,185
July 28	Austin	United States	Austin360 Amphitheater	10,170 / 13,164	$601,710
July 29	Grand Prairie	United States	Verizon Theatre	6,455 / 6,631	$419,575
July 31	Atlanta	United States	Aaron's Amphitheatre at Lakewood	26,451 / 37,736	$1,449,755
August 1	Atlanta	United States	Aaron's Amphitheatre at Lakewood	26,451 / 37,736	$1,449,755
August 2	Tuscaloosa	United States	Tuscaloosa Amphitheater	7,786 / 7,786	$436,016
August 4	Nashville	United States	Ascend Amphitheater	6,778 / 6,778	$352,670
August 5	Kansas City	United States	Starlight Theatre	6,847 / 7,538	$445,055
August 7	Cuyahoga Falls	United States	Blossom Music Center	14,062 / 20,451	$745,752
August 8	East Troy	United States	Alpine Valley Music Theatre	34,716 / 71,010	$1,859,160
August 9	East Troy	United States	Alpine Valley Music Theatre	34,716 / 71,010	$1,859,160
August 11	Philadelphia	United States	Mann Center for the Performing Arts	24,909 / 24,909	$1,371,635
August 12	Philadelphia	United States	Mann Center for the Performing Arts	24,909 / 24,909	$1,371,635
August 14	Raleigh	United States	Walnut Creek Amphitheatre	12,175 / 19,980	$669,755
August 15	Columbia	United States	Merriweather Post Pavilion	36,760 / 38,000	$1,877,760
August 16	Columbia	United States	Merriweather Post Pavilion	36,760 / 38,000	$1,877,760
August 21	Watkins Glen	United States	Watkins Glen International	N/A	
August 22	Watkins Glen	United States	Watkins Glen International	N/A	
August 23	Watkins Glen	United States	Watkins Glen International	N/A	
September 4	Commerce City	United States	Dick's Sporting Goods Park	69,907 / 75,156	$3,851,213
September 5	Commerce City	United States	Dick's Sporting Goods Park	69,907 / 75,156	$3,851,213
September 6	Commerce City	United States	Dick's Sporting Goods Park	69,907 / 75,156	$3,851,213
2015 New Year's Run
December 30	New York City	United States	Madison Square Garden	N/A	
December 31	New York City	United States	Madison Square Garden	N/A	
TOTAL				300,576 / 381,688 (79%)	$16,641,021

=== 2016 ===
Phish began 2016 right where the previous year had left off, with two shows at Madison Square Garden. Two weeks later, Phish performed their first-ever shows in Mexico, with a three-night destination performance at the Riviera Maya resort. As the band were performing right by the water, several nautical-themed songs made appearances throughout the run, including "A Song I Heard The Ocean Sing", "Prince Caspian", "Free", "Theme From The Bottom", "Drowned", "Sand", "Wading In The Velvet Sea", and others, while the third night's encore was a cover of Led Zeppelin's "The Ocean".

Phish's summer tour began in St. Paul, Minnesota, on 22 June and continued towards the east coast, including two nights at Wrigley Field, before heading west and wrapping up in Chula Vista, California, on 23 July. In August, the band made their first appearance at Lockn' Festival, headlining on the 26th and 28th, before making their way out to their annual Labor Day run at Dick's Sporting Goods Park, in Commerce City CO. For the first time since they began this run, in 2011, the band did not incorporate a cleverly written setlist into one of the shows.

7 October 2016 saw the release of Phish's 13th studio album, Big Boat. Produced by Bob Ezrin, this album featured several songs that had been debuted in the prior two years and included writing and vocal contributions from all four members of the band. The occasion of this release was marked with an appearance on the Tonight Show, on 10 October, where the band performed "Breath And Burning" and "Blaze On". Four days later, the band embarked on a 12-date fall tour that began in Charleston, South Carolina, and landed in Las Vegas, for a four-night Halloween run. Between those stops, the band performed in Jacksonville, Florida, two nights in Nashville, Tennessee (the first of which featured Bob Weir on most of the second set), two nights in Alpharetta, Georgia, and two nights in Grand Prairie, Texas.

The band's musical costume at this year's Halloween show was The Rise and Fall of Ziggy Stardust and the Spiders from Mars, by the late David Bowie (who had died earlier that year). Augmented by horns and a string sextet, the band paid tribute to their fallen hero. "Rock And Roll Suicide" was performed with Trey on lead vocals, crooner style, with no guitar – the only time in his career that he has performed in such a way.

Phish capped off 2016 with four shows at Madison Square Garden, culminating in a New Year's Eve third set that featured the horns from the Trey Anastasio Band for the duration of the set, as well as stage dancers for the New Year's gag, which was based on the song, "Petrichor", and its "rain" theme.

Songs debuted this year include "Miss You", "Breath And Burning", "Things People Do", "Waking Up Dead", "Friends", "Let's Go", "Ass Handed", "Petrichor", "Home", "More", "I Always Wanted It This Way", and "Running Out Of Time".

List of 2016 tour dates, showing date, city, country, venue, attendance, gross
Date (2016)	City	Country	Venue	Attendance	Gross
2015 New Year's Run (continued from 2015)
January 1	New York City	United States	Madison Square Garden	N/A	
January 2	New York City	United States	Madison Square Garden	N/A	
Riviera Maya 2016
January 15	Playa del Carmen	Mexico	Barceló Maya Beach	N/A	
January 16	Playa del Carmen	Mexico	Barceló Maya Beach	N/A	
January 17	Playa del Carmen	Mexico	Barceló Maya Beach	N/A	
Summer 2016
June 22	Saint Paul	United States	Xcel Energy Center	N/A	
June 24	Chicago	United States	Wrigley Field	83,588 / 84,356	$4,761,063
June 25	Chicago	United States	Wrigley Field	83,588 / 84,356	$4,761,063
June 26	Noblesville	United States	Klipsch Music Center	17,865 / 24,369	$738,703
June 28	Philadelphia	United States	Mann Center for the Performing Arts	24,852 / 25,160	$1,374,580
June 29	Philadelphia	United States	Mann Center for the Performing Arts	24,852 / 25,160	$1,374,580
July 1	Saratoga Springs	United States	Saratoga Performing Arts Center	60,838 / 75,531	$2,496,548
July 2	Saratoga Springs	United States	Saratoga Performing Arts Center	60,838 / 75,531	$2,496,548
July 3	Saratoga Springs	United States	Saratoga Performing Arts Center	60,838 / 75,531	$2,496,548
July 6	Portland	United States	Cross Insurance Arena	8,004 / 8,026	$488,244
July 8	Mansfield	United States	Xfinity Center	19,824 / 19,897	$983,352
July 9	Hartford	United States	Xfinity Theatre	21,877 / 24,759	$811,652
July 10	Syracuse	United States	Lakeview Amphitheater	16,550 / 19,870	$707,290
July 15	George	United States	The Gorge Amphitheatre	43,002 / 44,000	$1,908,669
July 16	George	United States	The Gorge Amphitheatre	43,002 / 44,000	$1,908,669
July 18	San Francisco	United States	Bill Graham Civic Auditorium	26,265 / 26,265	$1,707,355
July 19	San Francisco	United States	Bill Graham Civic Auditorium	26,265 / 26,265	$1,707,355
July 20	San Francisco	United States	Bill Graham Civic Auditorium	26,265 / 26,265	$1,707,355
July 22	Inglewood	United States	The Forum	12,138 / 14,577	$704,040
July 23	Chula Vista	United States	Sleep Train Amphitheatre	9,789 / 19,291	$440,030
August 26	Arrington	United States	Lockn' Festival	N/A	N/A
August 28	Arrington	United States	Lockn' Festival	N/A	N/A
September 2	Commerce City	United States	Dick's Sporting Goods Park	69,936 / 81,000	$4,031,536
September 3	Commerce City	United States	Dick's Sporting Goods Park	69,936 / 81,000	$4,031,536
September 4	Commerce City	United States	Dick's Sporting Goods Park	69,936 / 81,000	$4,031,536
Fall 2016
October 14	North Charleston	United States	North Charleston Coliseum	22,546 / 23,272	$1,465,490
October 15	North Charleston	United States	North Charleston Coliseum	22,546 / 23,272	$1,465,490
October 16	Jacksonville	United States	Jacksonville Veterans Memorial Arena	9,329 / 12,570	$593,885
October 18	Nashville	United States	Ascend Amphitheater	13,714 / 13,714	$711,550
October 19	Nashville	United States	Ascend Amphitheater	13,714 / 13,714	$711,550
October 21	Alpharetta	United States	Verizon Wireless Amphitheatre at Encore Park	25,965 / 26,000	$1,469,785
October 22	Alpharetta	United States	Verizon Wireless Amphitheatre at Encore Park	25,965 / 26,000	$1,469,785
October 24	Grand Prairie	United States	Verizon Theatre at Grand Prairie	9,711 / 13,362	$631,215
October 25	Grand Prairie	United States	Verizon Theatre at Grand Prairie	9,711 / 13,362	$631,215
October 28	Las Vegas	United States	MGM Grand Garden Arena	63,222 / 63,222	$4,076,085
October 29	Las Vegas	United States	MGM Grand Garden Arena	63,222 / 63,222	$4,076,085
October 30	Las Vegas	United States	MGM Grand Garden Arena	63,222 / 63,222	$4,076,085
October 31	Las Vegas	United States	MGM Grand Garden Arena	63,222 / 63,222	$4,076,085
2016 New Year's Run
December 28	New York City	United States	Madison Square Garden	76,566 / 76,566	$5,510,582
December 29	New York City	United States	Madison Square Garden	76,566 / 76,566	$5,510,582
December 30	New York City	United States	Madison Square Garden	76,566 / 76,566	$5,510,582
December 31	New York City	United States	Madison Square Garden	76,566 / 76,566	$5,510,582
TOTAL				635,581 / 696,039 (91%)	$35,611,654

=== 2017 ===
Phish began 2017 with a three-night destination show at the Barceló Maya Beach resort, in Playa del Carmen, Mexico, which ran from 13 to 15 January.

Phish's summer tour in 2017 was a rather unconventional one and began with three nights at Chicago's Northerly Island, followed by isolated one-night performances in Fairborn and Pittsburgh, before the band got down to business.

Keen to stay off the road as much as possible, Phish instead booked thirteen consecutive shows at Madison Square Garden. Known as the "Baker's Dozen", the shows ran from 21 July through 6 August. Partnering with Philadelphia's independent Federal Donuts, the band created a different theme for each night's show, based on the various flavors of donuts, and those who got in the door early were treated to a sample of that night's flavor. The shows' themes were Coconut, Strawberry, Red Velvet, Jam-Filled, Powdered, Chocolate, Cinnamon, Jimmies, Maple, Donut Holes, Lemon, Boston Cream, and Pink Glazed. Each night's setlist would tie in to the flavor somewhat, with both existing and newly learned songs making appearances (for example, the band performed Shuggie Otis' "Strawberry Letter 23" on "strawberry" night). Many of the shows would begin with a cover song performed a cappella, and it became a guessing game as to what songs may appear in a given night. Another feature of the Baker's Dozen was that, over the course of thirteen shows, Phish did not repeat a single song, performing 237 unique songs over the course of 26 sets of music, and they performed without any special guests.

For their efforts, and because of the sheer number of times Phish has sold out the venue, Madison Square Garden installed a banner that commemorates the Baker's Dozen, which hangs in the arena with the other championship banners.

For the seventh consecutive year, Phish returned to Dick's Sporting Goods Park, in Commerce City CO, for their annual Labor Day run. Once again foregoing their boiler plate setlist, the shows were heavy on improvisation and the result of a band still riding the momentum of the Baker's Dozen.

Phish concluded 2017 with a "long-awaited triumphant return" to Madison Square Garden for a four-show run that concluded on New Year's Eve. The gag this year was based on an aquatic theme, laid out in the song, "Soul Planet" (which was debuted that evening). The stage was transformed into a pirate ship, with sails, cannons, and a Phish-themed jolly roger flag. Audience members were given glowing bracelets that made the venue look like the sea. The remainder of the show contained songs that feature nautical themes.

Songs debuted this year include "Everything's Right", "Leaves", "Love Is What We Are", "Corona", "Thread", "Tuesday", "Crazy Sometimes", "Marissa", "Rise/Come Together", "End Of Session", "Sunshine Of Your Feeling", "Most Events Aren't Planned", and "Soul Planet".

List of 2017 tour dates, showing date, city, country, venue, attendance, gross
Date (2017)	City	Country	Venue	Attendance	Gross
Riviera Maya 2017
January 13	Playa del Carmen	Mexico	Barceló Maya Beach	N/A	
January 14	Playa del Carmen	Mexico	Barceló Maya Beach	N/A	
January 15	Playa del Carmen	Mexico	Barceló Maya Beach	N/A	
Summer 2017
July 14	Chicago	United States	Huntington Bank Pavilion at Northerly Island	49,817 / 78,174	$2,306,566
July 15	Chicago	United States	Huntington Bank Pavilion at Northerly Island	49,817 / 78,174	$2,306,566
July 16	Chicago	United States	Huntington Bank Pavilion at Northerly Island	49,817 / 78,174	$2,306,566
July 18	Fairborn	United States	Wright State University Nutter Center	11,266 / 11,295	$679,471
July 19	Pittsburgh	United States	Petersen Events Center	10,375 / 12,224	$562,947
The Baker's Dozen
July 21	New York City	United States	Madison Square Garden	227,385 / 236,278	$15,041,405
July 22	New York City	United States	Madison Square Garden	227,385 / 236,278	$15,041,405
July 23	New York City	United States	Madison Square Garden	227,385 / 236,278	$15,041,405
July 25	New York City	United States	Madison Square Garden	227,385 / 236,278	$15,041,405
July 26	New York City	United States	Madison Square Garden	227,385 / 236,278	$15,041,405
July 28	New York City	United States	Madison Square Garden	227,385 / 236,278	$15,041,405
July 29	New York City	United States	Madison Square Garden	227,385 / 236,278	$15,041,405
July 30	New York City	United States	Madison Square Garden	227,385 / 236,278	$15,041,405
August 1	New York City	United States	Madison Square Garden	227,385 / 236,278	$15,041,405
August 2	New York City	United States	Madison Square Garden	227,385 / 236,278	$15,041,405
August 4	New York City	United States	Madison Square Garden	227,385 / 236,278	$15,041,405
August 5	New York City	United States	Madison Square Garden	227,385 / 236,278	$15,041,405
August 6	New York City	United States	Madison Square Garden	227,385 / 236,278	$15,041,405
Labor Day Weekend 2017
September 1	Commerce City	United States	Dick's Sporting Goods Park	N/A	
September 2	Commerce City	United States	Dick's Sporting Goods Park	N/A	
September 3	Commerce City	United States	Dick's Sporting Goods Park	N/A	
2017 New Year's Run
December 28	New York City	United States	Madison Square Garden	76,598 / 76,598	$5,930,356
December 29	New York City	United States	Madison Square Garden	76,598 / 76,598	$5,930,356
December 30	New York City	United States	Madison Square Garden	76,598 / 76,598	$5,930,356
December 31	New York City	United States	Madison Square Garden	76,598 / 76,598	$5,930,356
TOTAL				375,441 / 414,569 (91%)	$24,520,745

=== 2018 ===
On February 26, 2018, Phish announced their eleventh festival named Curveball. The festival was supposed to be held once again at Watkins Glen International in Watkins Glen, New York, and take place August 17–19, 2018. However, torrential downpours and flooding throughout the Finger Lakes region of upstate New York led the state's health department to cancel the festival in order to protect the health and safety of concert goers. A mandatory requirement to boil all water was put in place during the week before and on Thursday, August 16, the water was still deemed too unsafe to drink.

As a result of the cancelation, Curveball ticketholders were given both a full refund and free livestreams of all three nights of Phish's annual Labor Day weekend run at Dick's Sporting Goods Park in Commerce City, Colorado, which was held two weeks later.

On Halloween night, the first of four nights at MGM Grand Garden Arena in Las Vegas, Phish performed their tenth musical costume set, playing the album í rokk by Kasvot Vext (new Phish material disguised as an obscure album by a fictional 1980s Scandinavian progressive rock band) in its entirety.

List of 2018 tour dates, showing date, city, country, venue, attendance, gross
Date (2018)	City	Country	Venue	Attendance	Gross
Summer 2018
July 17	Stateline	United States	Lake Tahoe Outdoor Arena	17,150 / 17,150	$1,269,027
July 18	Stateline	United States	Lake Tahoe Outdoor Arena	17,150 / 17,150	$1,269,027
July 20	George	United States	The Gorge Amphitheatre	N/A	
July 21	George	United States	The Gorge Amphitheatre	N/A	
July 22	George	United States	The Gorge Amphitheatre	N/A	
July 24	San Francisco	United States	Bill Graham Civic Auditorium	17,507 / 17,507	$1,399,840
July 25	San Francisco	United States	Bill Graham Civic Auditorium	17,507 / 17,507	$1,399,840
July 27	Inglewood	United States	The Forum	23,482 / 23,482	$1,642,872
July 28	Inglewood	United States	The Forum	23,482 / 23,482	$1,642,872
July 31	Austin	United States	Austin360 Amphitheater	N/A	
August 3	Alpharetta	United States	Verizon Wireless Amphitheatre at Encore Park	38,922 / 38,922	$2,081,865
August 4	Alpharetta	United States	Verizon Wireless Amphitheatre at Encore Park	38,922 / 38,922	$2,081,865
August 5	Alpharetta	United States	Verizon Wireless Amphitheatre at Encore Park	38,922 / 38,922	$2,081,865
August 7	Camden	United States	BB&T Pavilion	35,064 / 39,941	$1,711,072
August 8	Camden	United States	BB&T Pavilion	35,064 / 39,941	$1,711,072
August 10	Raleigh	United States	Coastal Credit Union Music Park	N/A	
August 11	Columbia	United States	Merriweather Post Pavilion	N/A	
August 12	Columbia	United States	Merriweather Post Pavilion	N/A	
~~August 17~~	~~Watkins Glen~~	United States	~~Watkins Glen International~~	N/A	
~~August 18~~	~~Watkins Glen~~	United States	~~Watkins Glen International~~	N/A	
~~August 19~~	~~Watkins Glen~~	United States	~~Watkins Glen International~~	N/A	
August 31	Commerce City	United States	Dick's Sporting Goods Park	N/A	
September 1	Commerce City	United States	Dick's Sporting Goods Park	N/A	
September 2	Commerce City	United States	Dick's Sporting Goods Park	N/A	
Fall 2018
October 16	Albany	United States	Times Union Center	27,170 / 27,170	$1,917,380
October 17	Albany	United States	Times Union Center	27,170 / 27,170	$1,917,380
October 19	Hampton	United States	Hampton Coliseum	N/A	
October 20	Hampton	United States	Hampton Coliseum	N/A	
October 21	Hampton	United States	Hampton Coliseum	N/A	
October 23	Nashville	United States	Ascend Amphitheater	N/A	
October 24	Nashville	United States	Ascend Amphitheater	N/A	
October 26	Rosemont	United States	Allstate Arena	N/A	
October 27	Rosemont	United States	Allstate Arena	N/A	
October 28	Rosemont	United States	Allstate Arena	N/A	
October 31	Las Vegas	United States	MGM Grand Garden Arena	58,840 / 62,745	$4,506,580
November 1	Las Vegas	United States	MGM Grand Garden Arena	58,840 / 62,745	$4,506,580
November 2	Las Vegas	United States	MGM Grand Garden Arena	58,840 / 62,745	$4,506,580
November 3	Las Vegas	United States	MGM Grand Garden Arena	58,840 / 62,745	$4,506,580
2018 New Year's Run
December 28	New York City	United States	Madison Square Garden	76,085 / 76,085	$6,332,513
December 29	New York City	United States	Madison Square Garden	76,085 / 76,085	$6,332,513
December 30	New York City	United States	Madison Square Garden	76,085 / 76,085	$6,332,513
December 31	New York City	United States	Madison Square Garden	76,085 / 76,085	$6,332,513
TOTAL				294,220 / 303,002 (97%)	$20,861,149

=== 2019 ===
List of 2019 tour dates, showing date, city, country, venue, attendance, gross
Date (2019)	City	Country	Venue	Attendance	Gross
Riviera Maya 2019
February 21	Playa del Carmen	Mexico	Barceló Maya Beach	N/A	
February 22	Playa del Carmen	Mexico	Barceló Maya Beach	N/A	
February 23	Playa del Carmen	Mexico	Barceló Maya Beach	N/A	
Summer 2019
June 11	St. Louis	United States	Chaifetz Arena	17,464 / 20,601	$1,215,751
June 12	St. Louis	United States	Chaifetz Arena	17,464 / 20,601	$1,215,751
June 14	Manchester	United States	Bonnaroo Music and Arts Festival	N/A	
June 16	Manchester	United States	Bonnaroo Music and Arts Festival	N/A	
June 18	Toronto	Canada	Budweiser Stage	N/A	
June 19	Cuyahoga Falls	United States	Blossom Music Center	N/A	
June 21	Charlotte	United States	PNC Music Pavilion	N/A	
June 22	Columbia	United States	Merriweather Post Pavilion	N/A	
June 23	Columbia	United States	Merriweather Post Pavilion	N/A	
June 25	Bangor	United States	Darling's Waterfront Pavilion	29,708 / 29,708	$1,988,488
June 26	Bangor	United States	Darling's Waterfront Pavilion	29,708 / 29,708	$1,988,488
June 28	Camden	United States	BB&T Pavilion	52,383 / 63,036	$3,251,326
June 29	Camden	United States	BB&T Pavilion	52,383 / 63,036	$3,251,326
June 30	Camden	United States	BB&T Pavilion	52,383 / 63,036	$3,251,326
July 2	Saratoga Springs	United States	Saratoga Performing Arts Center	35,878 / 50,165	$2,037,814
July 3	Saratoga Springs	United States	Saratoga Performing Arts Center	35,878 / 50,165	$2,037,814
July 5	Boston	United States	Fenway Park	65,459 / 69,940	$4,891,124
July 6	Boston	United States	Fenway Park	65,459 / 69,940	$4,891,124
July 9	Uncasville	United States	Mohegan Sun Arena	18,620 / 18,620	$1,452,360
July 10	Uncasville	United States	Mohegan Sun Arena	18,620 / 18,620	$1,452,360
July 12	East Troy	United States	Alpine Valley Music Theatre	54,183 / 107,266	$3,322,634
July 13	East Troy	United States	Alpine Valley Music Theatre	54,183 / 107,266	$3,322,634
July 14	East Troy	United States	Alpine Valley Music Theatre	54,183 / 107,266	$3,322,634
August 30	Commerce City	United States	Dick's Sporting Goods Park	70,574 / 70,574	$5,638,350
August 31	Commerce City	United States	Dick's Sporting Goods Park	70,574 / 70,574	$5,638,350
September 1	Commerce City	United States	Dick's Sporting Goods Park	70,574 / 70,574	$5,638,350
Fall 2019
November 29	Providence	United States	Dunkin' Donuts Center	N/A	
November 30	Providence	United States	Dunkin' Donuts Center	N/A	
December 1	Uniondale	United States	Nassau Coliseum	15,451 / 15,503	$1,492,481
December 4	Pittsburgh	United States	Petersen Events Center	N/A	
December 6	North Charleston	United States	North Charleston Coliseum	N/A	
December 7	North Charleston	United States	North Charleston Coliseum	N/A	
December 8	North Charleston	United States	North Charleston Coliseum	N/A	
2019 New Year's Run
December 28	New York City	United States	Madison Square Garden	76,079 / 76,079	$6,712,920
December 29	New York City	United States	Madison Square Garden	76,079 / 76,079	$6,712,920
December 30	New York City	United States	Madison Square Garden	76,079 / 76,079	$6,712,920
December 31	New York City	United States	Madison Square Garden	76,079 / 76,079	$6,712,920
TOTAL				435,799 / 521,492 (81%)	$29,003,248

== 2020s ==
=== 2020 ===
Phish announced their annual summer tour on January 23, 2020, but all dates for 2020 were postponed to 2021 due to the COVID-19 pandemic.

List of 2020 tour dates, showing date, city, country, venue
Date (2020)	City	Country	Venue	Attendance	Gross
Riviera Maya 2020
February 20	Cancún	Mexico	Moon Palace Resort	N/A	
February 21	Cancún	Mexico	Moon Palace Resort	N/A	
February 22	Cancún	Mexico	Moon Palace Resort	N/A	
February 23	Cancún	Mexico	Moon Palace Resort	N/A	

=== 2021 ===
On Halloween night, the last of four nights at MGM Grand Garden Arena in Las Vegas, Phish performed their eleventh musical costume set, playing the album Get More Down by Sci-Fi Soldier (new material by Phish presented as material by a futuristic rock band from the year 4680) in its entirety.

Phish's annual New Year's Eve run in New York City at Madison Square Garden on December 29-January 1, 2021-22 was postponed due to the surge of the COVID-19 Omicron variant in New York in order to protect the health of concert goers.

To make up for the postponed New Year's Eve run, Phish performed three full sets of music from their live event rehearsal space in Lititz, Pennsylvania via livestream on the band's YouTube channel, live recordings website, and a simulcast on the band's SiriusXM radio channel on December 31, 2021. The event was free for fans.

The Madison Square Garden shows were rescheduled to April 20–23, 2022, including a three-set performance on the third night, April 22, to make up for the forfeited New Year's Eve performance.

List of 2021 tour dates, showing date, city, country, venue, attendance, gross
Date (2021)	City	Country	Venue	Attendance	Gross
Summer 2021
July 28	Rogers	United States	Walmart Arkansas Music Pavilion	N/A	
July 30	Pelham	United States	Oak Mountain Amphitheatre	N/A	
July 31	Alpharetta	United States	Ameris Bank Amphitheatre	25,924 / 25,924	$1,908,306
August 1	Alpharetta	United States	Ameris Bank Amphitheatre	25,924 / 25,924	$1,908,306
August 3	Nashville	United States	Ascend Amphitheater	N/A	
August 4	Nashville	United States	Ascend Amphitheater	N/A	
August 6	Noblesville	United States	Ruoff Music Center	70,100 / 74,652	$4,036,443
August 7	Noblesville	United States	Ruoff Music Center	70,100 / 74,652	$4,036,443
August 8	Noblesville	United States	Ruoff Music Center	70,100 / 74,652	$4,036,443
August 10	Hershey	United States	Hersheypark Stadium	41,703 / 54,678	$3,385,967
August 11	Hershey	United States	Hersheypark Stadium	41,703 / 54,678	$3,385,967
August 13	Atlantic City	United States	Atlantic City Beach	100,821 / 100,821	$8,440,509
August 14	Atlantic City	United States	Atlantic City Beach	100,821 / 100,821	$8,440,509
August 15	Atlantic City	United States	Atlantic City Beach	100,821 / 100,821	$8,440,509
August 27	George	United States	The Gorge Amphitheatre	48,912 / 66,000	$3,328,122
August 28	George	United States	The Gorge Amphitheatre	48,912 / 66,000	$3,328,122
August 29	George	United States	The Gorge Amphitheatre	48,912 / 66,000	$3,328,122
August 31	Mountain View	United States	Shoreline Amphitheatre	15,152 / 24,000	$1,409,647
September 1	Mountain View	United States	Shoreline Amphitheatre	15,152 / 24,000	$1,409,647
September 3	Commerce City	United States	Dick's Sporting Goods Park	70,088 / 70,088	$6,109,051
September 4	Commerce City	United States	Dick's Sporting Goods Park	70,088 / 70,088	$6,109,051
September 5	Commerce City	United States	Dick's Sporting Goods Park	70,088 / 70,088	$6,109,051
Fall 2021
October 15	Sacramento	United States	Golden 1 Center	N/A	
October 16	San Francisco	United States	Chase Center	25,857 / 25,857	$2,297,933
October 17	San Francisco	United States	Chase Center	25,857 / 25,857	$2,297,933
October 19	Eugene	United States	Matthew Knight Arena	19,294 / 29,294	$1,588,902
October 20	Eugene	United States	Matthew Knight Arena	19,294 / 29,294	$1,588,902
October 22	Phoenix	United States	Ak-Chin Pavilion	N/A	
October 23	Chula Vista	United States	North Island Credit Union Amphitheatre	N/A	
October 24	Inglewood	United States	The Forum	N/A	
October 26	Santa Barbara	United States	Santa Barbara Bowl	N/A	
October 28	Las Vegas	United States	MGM Grand Garden Arena	62,851 / 62,851	$5,426,815
October 29	Las Vegas	United States	MGM Grand Garden Arena	62,851 / 62,851	$5,426,815
October 30	Las Vegas	United States	MGM Grand Garden Arena	62,851 / 62,851	$5,426,815
October 31	Las Vegas	United States	MGM Grand Garden Arena	62,851 / 62,851	$5,426,815
2021 New Year's Run
December 31	Lititz	United States	Rock Lititz	N/A	
TOTAL				480,702 / 534,165 (90%)	$37,931,695

=== 2022 ===
List of 2022 tour dates, showing date, city, country, venue, attendance, gross
Date (2022)	City	Country	Venue	Attendance	Gross
Riviera Maya 2022
February 24	Cancún	Mexico	Moon Palace Resort	2,423 / 2,423	$17,710,239
February 25	Cancún	Mexico	Moon Palace Resort	2,423 / 2,423	$17,710,239
February 26	Cancún	Mexico	Moon Palace Resort	2,423 / 2,423	$17,710,239
February 27	Cancún	Mexico	Moon Palace Resort	2,423 / 2,423	$17,710,239
2021 New Years Run (rescheduled from December 29–January 1)
April 20	New York City	United States	Madison Square Garden	76,470 / 76,470	$8,787,041
April 21	New York City	United States	Madison Square Garden	76,470 / 76,470	$8,787,041
April 22	New York City	United States	Madison Square Garden	76,470 / 76,470	$8,787,041
April 23	New York City	United States	Madison Square Garden	76,470 / 76,470	$8,787,041
Spring 2022
May 27	Orange Beach	United States	The Wharf Amphitheater	23,256 / 44,029	$2,033,125
May 28	Orange Beach	United States	The Wharf Amphitheater	23,256 / 44,029	$2,033,125
May 29	Orange Beach	United States	The Wharf Amphitheater	23,256 / 44,029	$2,033,125
May 31	Charleston	United States	Credit One Stadium	23,982 / 24,829	$2,163,903
June 1	Charleston	United States	Credit One Stadium	23,982 / 24,829	$2,163,903
June 3	Noblesville	United States	Ruoff Music Center	46,975 / 73,814	$3,213,591
June 4	Noblesville	United States	Ruoff Music Center	46,975 / 73,814	$3,213,591
June 5	Noblesville	United States	Ruoff Music Center	46,975 / 73,814	$3,213,591
Summer 2022
July 14	Mansfield	United States	Xfinity Center	37,145 / 39,800	$3,077,002
July 15	Mansfield	United States	Xfinity Center	37,145 / 39,800	$3,077,002
July 16	Bangor	United States	Maine Savings Amphitheater	14,593 / 15,300	$1,123,483
July 19	Philadelphia	United States	TD Pavilion at the Mann	25,054 / 25,077	$1,922,112
July 20	Philadelphia	United States	TD Pavilion at the Mann	25,054 / 25,077	$1,922,112
July 22	Bethel	United States	Bethel Woods Center for the Arts	31,732 / 31,952	$2,037,921
July 23	Bethel	United States	Bethel Woods Center for the Arts	31,732 / 31,952	$2,037,921
July 24	Hartford	United States	Xfinity Theatre	17,495 / 24,752	$1,115,234
July 26	Wantagh	United States	Northwell Health at Jones Beach Theater	25,074 / 27,608	$2,384,697
July 27	Wantagh	United States	Northwell Health at Jones Beach Theater	25,074 / 27,608	$2,384,697
July 29	Raleigh	United States	Coastal Credit Union Music Park	16,399 / 19,979	$1,172,475
July 30	Columbia	United States	Merriweather Post Pavilion	36,131 / 38,000	$2,432,078
July 31	Columbia	United States	Merriweather Post Pavilion	36,131 / 38,000	$2,432,078
August 2	Cuyahoga Falls	United States	Blossom Music Center	14,110 / 20,206	$969,903
August 3	Clarkston	United States	Pine Knob Music Theatre	12,665 / 15,515	$935,086
August 5	Atlantic City	United States	Atlantic City Beach	48,577 / 105,000	$4,728,475
August 6	Atlantic City	United States	Atlantic City Beach	48,577 / 105,000	$4,728,475
August 7	Atlantic City	United States	Atlantic City Beach	48,577 / 105,000	$4,728,475
August 10	Toronto	Canada	Budweiser Stage	8,795 / 16,070	$585,928
August 12	East Troy	United States	Alpine Valley Music Theatre	55,138 / 105,005	$3,723,534
August 13	East Troy	United States	Alpine Valley Music Theatre	55,138 / 105,005	$3,723,534
August 14	East Troy	United States	Alpine Valley Music Theatre	55,138 / 105,005	$3,723,534
September 1	Commerce City	United States	Dick's Sporting Goods Park	93,478 / 94,000	$8,565,888
September 2	Commerce City	United States	Dick's Sporting Goods Park	93,478 / 94,000	$8,565,888
September 3	Commerce City	United States	Dick's Sporting Goods Park	93,478 / 94,000	$8,565,888
September 4	Commerce City	United States	Dick's Sporting Goods Park	93,478 / 94,000	$8,565,888
2022 New Years Run
December 28	New York City	United States	Madison Square Garden	69,777 / 69,777	$9,800,072
December 29	New York City	United States	Madison Square Garden	69,777 / 69,777	$9,800,072
December 30	New York City	United States	Madison Square Garden	69,777 / 69,777	$9,800,072
December 31	New York City	United States	Madison Square Garden	69,777 / 69,777	$9,800,072
TOTAL				679,269 / 869,606 (78%)	$78,481,787

=== 2023 ===
List of 2023 tour dates, showing date, city, country, venue
Date (2023)	City	Country	Venue
Riviera Maya 2023
February 23	Cancún	Mexico	Moon Palace Resort
February 24	Cancún	Mexico	Moon Palace Resort
February 25	Cancún	Mexico	Moon Palace Resort
February 26	Cancún	Mexico	Moon Palace Resort
Spring 2023
April 14	Seattle	United States	Climate Pledge Arena
April 15	Seattle	United States	Climate Pledge Arena
April 17	Berkeley	United States	William Randolph Hearst Greek Theatre
April 18	Berkeley	United States	William Randolph Hearst Greek Theatre
April 19	Berkeley	United States	William Randolph Hearst Greek Theatre
April 21	Los Angeles	United States	Hollywood Bowl
April 22	Los Angeles	United States	Hollywood Bowl
April 23	Los Angeles	United States	Hollywood Bowl
Summer 2023
July 11	Huntsville	United States	Orion Amphitheater
July 12	Huntsville	United States	Orion Amphitheater
July 14	Alpharetta	United States	Ameris Bank Amphitheatre
July 15	Alpharetta	United States	Ameris Bank Amphitheatre
July 16	Alpharetta	United States	Ameris Bank Amphitheatre
July 18	Wilmington	United States	Live Oak Bank Pavilion
July 19	Wilmington	United States	Live Oak Bank Pavilion
July 21	Burgettstown	United States	The Pavilion at Star Lake
July 22	Burgettstown	United States	The Pavilion at Star Lake
July 23	Syracuse	United States	Lakeview Amphitheater
July 25	Philadelphia	United States	Mann Center for the Performing Arts
July 26	Philadelphia	United States	Mann Center for the Performing Arts
July 28	New York City	United States	Madison Square Garden
July 29	New York City	United States	Madison Square Garden
July 30	New York City	United States	Madison Square Garden
August 1	New York City	United States	Madison Square Garden
August 2	New York City	United States	Madison Square Garden
August 4	New York City	United States	Madison Square Garden
August 5	New York City	United States	Madison Square Garden
August 25	Saratoga Springs	United States	Saratoga Performing Arts Center
August 26	Saratoga Springs	United States	Saratoga Performing Arts Center
August 31	Commerce City	United States	Dick's Sporting Goods Park
September 1	Commerce City	United States	Dick's Sporting Goods Park
September 2	Commerce City	United States	Dick's Sporting Goods Park
September 3	Commerce City	United States	Dick's Sporting Goods Park
Fall 2023
October 6	Nashville	United States	Bridgestone Arena
October 7	Nashville	United States	Bridgestone Arena
October 8	Nashville	United States	Bridgestone Arena
October 10	Fairborn	United States	Nutter Center
October 11	Fairborn	United States	Nutter Center
October 13	Chicago	United States	United Center
October 14	Chicago	United States	United Center
October 15	Chicago	United States	United Center
2023 New Year's Run
December 28	New York City	United States	Madison Square Garden
December 29	New York City	United States	Madison Square Garden
December 30	New York City	United States	Madison Square Garden
December 31	New York City	United States	Madison Square Garden

==== Box office score data ====
List of box office score data with date, city, venue, attendance, gross
Date (2023)	City	Venue	Attendance	Gross
February 23	Cancún, Mexico	Moon Palace Resort	24,620 / 24,620	$22,147,265
February 24	Cancún, Mexico	Moon Palace Resort	24,620 / 24,620	$22,147,265
February 25	Cancún, Mexico	Moon Palace Resort	24,620 / 24,620	$22,147,265
February 26	Cancún, Mexico	Moon Palace Resort	24,620 / 24,620	$22,147,265
July 28	New York City, United States	Madison Square Garden	120,385 / 129,122	$10,410,013
July 29	New York City, United States	Madison Square Garden	120,385 / 129,122	$10,410,013
July 30	New York City, United States	Madison Square Garden	120,385 / 129,122	$10,410,013
August 1	New York City, United States	Madison Square Garden	120,385 / 129,122	$10,410,013
August 2	New York City, United States	Madison Square Garden	120,385 / 129,122	$10,410,013
August 4	New York City, United States	Madison Square Garden	120,385 / 129,122	$10,410,013
August 5	New York City, United States	Madison Square Garden	120,385 / 129,122	$10,410,013
August 31	Commerce City, United States	Dick's Sporting Goods Park	92,405 / 94,000	$8,424,549
September 1	Commerce City, United States	Dick's Sporting Goods Park	92,405 / 94,000	$8,424,549
September 2	Commerce City, United States	Dick's Sporting Goods Park	92,405 / 94,000	$8,424,549
September 3	Commerce City, United States	Dick's Sporting Goods Park	92,405 / 94,000	$8,424,549
TOTAL			237,410 / 247,742 (96%)	$40,981,827

=== 2024 ===
On January 16, 2024, Phish announced Mondegreen, the band's first festival since the cancellation of Curveball six years prior. It is officially considered the eleventh Phish festival, as the band does not count Curveball. A nine year gap between Magnaball and Mondegreen made for the biggest gap between festivals in the band's history.

Mondegreen was named after the term for mishearings of song lyrics. The festival took place in Dover, Delaware at The Woodlands of Dover Motor Speedway, also the site of the Firefly Music Festival. Promotional art was heavily themed after the wooded location, featuring trees and green colors with an additional space alien theme. The festival ran for four days from August 15 through August 18, 2024, becoming the band's first festival to last this long, although the fourth day was eventually cut short.

Aside from Phish, it featured nightly DJ performances by Flying Mojito Bros, Made Of Oak, and Questlove, as well as live stand-up comedy with Dave Hill, Rory Scovel, Jordan Jensen, and Gianmarco Soresi. The festival grounds also contained a Ferris wheel, a giant cardboard building dubbed the "City Hall" that was later torn down due to weather conditions, a walk-through art exhibit dubbed the "Cerealist Bowl" due to themes of surrealist art and cereal (playing into the festival's theme of mondegreens), a gigantic moon sphere dubbed the "Museum of the Moon," and many art installations contributed by various outside artists. Phish planned to play two sets daily at the festival, making for eight in total. On the second night, Phish performed a "secret set" which was dubbed the "Mondegreen Ambient Jam" by LivePhish.com. The final day was cut short when severe weather during the originally scheduled set times forced the band to take the stage during the day, during which they played a single set.

The band kicked off 2024 with a four-night destination weekend at the Moon Palace beach resort in Riviera Maya, Mexico from February 21–24. On April 18–21, 2024, Phish performed a four-night stand at Sphere in Las Vegas, becoming the second musical band after U2 to have a residency hosted at the venue.

Phish began their 2024 summer tour on July 19 in Mansfield, MA and performed more multi-night stands in Uncasville CT, East Troy WI, St. Louis MO, Noblesville IN, Grand Rapids MI, and ending in Bethel NY on August 11, followed by Mondegreen and the band's traditional Labor Day weekend run in Denver, CO at Dick's Sporting Goods Park.

Phish also performed a very special three-night stand at MVP Arena in Albany, New York on October 25–27, 2024, with all proceeds benefitting the Divided Sky Foundation, a non-profit organization spearheaded by Trey Anastasio that is dedicated to addiction recovery, and the newly opened Divided Sky Residential Recovery Program facility in Ludlow, Vermont. The band capped off the year with a four-night New Year's Eve run in New York City at Madison Square Garden.

List of 2024 tour dates, showing date, city, country, venue
Date (2024)	City	Country	Venue	Attendance	Gross
Riviera Maya 2024
February 21	Cancún	Mexico	Moon Palace Resort	N/A	
February 22	Cancún	Mexico	Moon Palace Resort	N/A	
February 23	Cancún	Mexico	Moon Palace Resort	N/A	
February 24	Cancún	Mexico	Moon Palace Resort	N/A	
Sphere 2024
April 18	Las Vegas	United States	Sphere	N/A	
April 19	Las Vegas	United States	Sphere	N/A	
April 20	Las Vegas	United States	Sphere	N/A	
April 21	Las Vegas	United States	Sphere	N/A	
Summer 2024
July 19	Mansfield	United States	Xfinity Center	N/A	
July 20	Mansfield	United States	Xfinity Center	N/A	
July 21	Mansfield	United States	Xfinity Center	N/A	
July 23	Uncasville	United States	Mohegan Sun Arena	N/A	
July 24	Uncasville	United States	Mohegan Sun Arena	N/A	
July 26	East Troy	United States	Alpine Valley Music Theatre	N/A	
July 27	East Troy	United States	Alpine Valley Music Theatre	N/A	
July 28	East Troy	United States	Alpine Valley Music Theatre	N/A	
July 30	St. Louis	United States	Chaifetz Arena	N/A	
July 31	St. Louis	United States	Chaifetz Arena	N/A	
August 2	Noblesville	United States	Ruoff Music Center	N/A	
August 3	Noblesville	United States	Ruoff Music Center	N/A	
August 4	Noblesville	United States	Ruoff Music Center	N/A	
August 6	Grand Rapids	United States	Van Andel Arena	N/A	
August 7	Grand Rapids	United States	Van Andel Arena	N/A	
August 9	Bethel	United States	Bethel Woods Center for the Arts	N/A	
August 10	Bethel	United States	Bethel Woods Center for the Arts	N/A	
August 11	Bethel	United States	Bethel Woods Center for the Arts	N/A	
August 15	Dover	United States	The Woodlands	N/A	
August 16	Dover	United States	The Woodlands	N/A	
August 17	Dover	United States	The Woodlands	N/A	
August 18	Dover	United States	The Woodlands	N/A	
August 29	Commerce City	United States	Dick's Sporting Goods Park	N/A	
August 30	Commerce City	United States	Dick's Sporting Goods Park	N/A	
August 31	Commerce City	United States	Dick's Sporting Goods Park	N/A	
September 1	Commerce City	United States	Dick's Sporting Goods Park	N/A	
Benefit for The Divided Sky Foundation
October 25	Albany	United States	MVP Arena	N/A	
October 26	Albany	United States	MVP Arena	N/A	
October 27	Albany	United States	MVP Arena	N/A	
2024 New Year's Run
December 28	New York City	United States	Madison Square Garden	N/A	
December 29	New York City	United States	Madison Square Garden	N/A	
December 30	New York City	United States	Madison Square Garden	N/A	
December 31	New York City	United States	Madison Square Garden	N/A	

=== 2025 ===
Phish began 2025 with a four-night destination weekend at the Moon Palace beach resort in Riviera Maya, Mexico, which ran from January 29 to February 1.

Phish embarked on a short West Coast spring tour in April 2025, performing stops in Seattle, Portland, San Francisco, and ending with a three-night stand in Los Angeles.

Phish's 2025 summer tour began with a three-night run on June 20 in Manchester, New Hampshire and wrapped up with a three-night stand in Saratoga Springs, New York at the end of July. In addition, Phish took a break this year from their long-standing Labor Day weekend tradition at Denver's Dick's Sporting Goods Park, instead performing at Folsom Field in Boulder, Colorado over the Fourth of July weekend. In September, before the summer came to a close, the band made an appearance at Louisville, Kentucky's Bourbon & Beyond festival, marking their first stop in Louisville in 30 years since 1995, before performing multi-night stops in Birmingham, Alabama; Alpharetta, Georgia; and Hampton, Virginia. During the September 19th show in Hampton, a tragic incident took place in the parking lot outside the venue, in which an altercation behind one of the tents in the unofficial vending area resulted in a stabbing that caused one person to lose their life and two others to be injured.

The band capped off 2025 with their annual four-night New Year's Eve run at Madison Square Garden in New York. The band's December 31 New Year's Eve show centered on a dairy and ice cream theme, in which a giant freezer prop was the focal point of the stage. Throughout the third set, various dancers and performers dressed as cows, milk cartons, and ice cream men emerged from and exited through the freezer throughout the set while Phish performed a "cold" and "dairy" setlist, with songs such as "It's Ice" that led into a debut cover of Prince's "Cream," followed by the milk-themed "Harry Hood," and during "2001 (Also Sprach Zarathustra)", Jon Fishman descended into the freezer and a "fake" Fishman then rose from it riding a giant Bomb Pop popsicle like a rocket, a nod to the iconic bomb-riding scene from the film Dr. Strangelove. Setbreak music during the show also featured tracks like "Cold as Ice," "C.R.E.A.M.", and "Ice Ice Baby." For the show's encore, the members of Phish themselves dressed up as ice cream men and performed an a-capella cover of "Sincere" from The Music Man, marking another live debut for the band. Phish then performed "Spock's Brain" for the first time in six years, in which a giant milk carton with a "Missing" notice for the song was lowered above the band during the performance. The show concluded with "Tweezer's Reprise", which featured the return of the night's dancers on stage to throw beach balls into the audience.

List of 2025 tour dates, showing date, city, country, venue
Date (2025)	City	Country	Venue	Attendance	Gross
Riviera Maya 2025
January 29	Cancún	Mexico	Moon Palace Resort	N/A	
January 30	Cancún	Mexico	Moon Palace Resort	N/A	
January 31	Cancún	Mexico	Moon Palace Resort	N/A	
February 1	Cancún	Mexico	Moon Palace Resort	N/A	
Spring 2025
April 18	Seattle	United States	Climate Pledge Arena	N/A	
April 19	Seattle	United States	Climate Pledge Arena	N/A	
April 20	Portland	United States	Moda Center	N/A	
April 22	San Francisco	United States	Bill Graham Civic Auditorium	N/A	
April 23	San Francisco	United States	Bill Graham Civic Auditorium	N/A	
April 25	Los Angeles	United States	Hollywood Bowl	N/A	
April 26	Los Angeles	United States	Hollywood Bowl	N/A	
April 27	Los Angeles	United States	Hollywood Bowl	N/A	
Summer 2025
June 20	Manchester	United States	SNHU Arena	N/A	
June 21	Manchester	United States	SNHU Arena	N/A	
June 22	Manchester	United States	SNHU Arena	N/A	
June 24	Pittsburgh	United States	Petersen Events Center	N/A	
June 27	Austin	United States	Moody Center	N/A	
June 28	Austin	United States	Moody Center	N/A	
July 3	Boulder	United States	Folsom Field	N/A	
July 4	Boulder	United States	Folsom Field	N/A	
July 5	Boulder	United States	Folsom Field	N/A	
July 9	Columbus	United States	Schottenstein Center	N/A	
July 11	Charleston	United States	North Charleston Coliseum	N/A	
July 12	Charleston	United States	North Charleston Coliseum	N/A	
July 13	Charleston	United States	North Charleston Coliseum	N/A	
July 15	Philadelphia	United States	Mann Center for the Performing Arts	N/A	
July 16	Philadelphia	United States	Mann Center for the Performing Arts	N/A	
July 18	Chicago	United States	United Center	N/A	
July 19	Chicago	United States	United Center	N/A	
July 20	Chicago	United States	United Center	N/A	
July 22	New York City	United States	Forest Hills Stadium	N/A	
July 23	New York City	United States	Forest Hills Stadium	N/A	
July 25	Saratoga Springs	United States	Saratoga Performing Arts Center	N/A	
July 26	Saratoga Springs	United States	Saratoga Performing Arts Center	N/A	
July 27	Saratoga Springs	United States	Saratoga Performing Arts Center	N/A	
September 12	Louisville	United States	Bourbon & Beyond Festival	N/A	
September 13	Birmingham	United States	Coca-Cola Amphitheater	N/A	
September 14	Birmingham	United States	Coca-Cola Amphitheater	N/A	
September 16	Alpharetta	United States	Ameris Bank Amphitheatre	N/A	
September 17	Alpharetta	United States	Ameris Bank Amphitheatre	N/A	
September 19	Hampton	United States	Hampton Coliseum	N/A	
September 20	Hampton	United States	Hampton Coliseum	N/A	
September 21	Hampton	United States	Hampton Coliseum	N/A	
New Year's Eve 2025
December 28	New York City	United States	Madison Square Garden	N/A	
December 29	New York City	United States	Madison Square Garden	N/A	
December 30	New York City	United States	Madison Square Garden	N/A	
December 31	New York City	United States	Madison Square Garden	N/A	

=== 2026 ===
Phish kicked off 2026 with their ninth annual Riviera Maya destination residency in Mexico. The band performed eight sets of music over four nights, and the event also featured live stand-up comedy sets by Natasha Leggero, Al Madrigal, Kyle Kinane, Moshe Kasher, Carmen Christopher, and emceed by Cam Herdt. There were also late night poolside DJ sets from Tad Cautious, Cosmo Baker, Mitch Please, and Made of Oak. The band then performed a nine-night spring residency at the Sphere in Las Vegas from April 16 to May 2, performing 161 unique songs without a single repeat. The highly acclaimed run shattered setlist variety records at the venue and featured entirely evolved, post-apocalyptic, and mind-bending visual themes. Phish's annual summer tour in 2026 kicked off in Madison, Wisconsin, highlighted by a five-night residency at Madison Square Garden (bringing their total venue count to 96 shows), and a major wrap-up at Boston's Fenway Park.

List of 2026 tour dates, showing date, city, country, venue
Date (2026)	City	Country	Venue	Attendance	Gross
Riviera Maya 2026
January 28	Cancún	Mexico	Moon Palace Resort	N/A	
January 29	Cancún	Mexico	Moon Palace Resort	N/A	
January 30	Cancún	Mexico	Moon Palace Resort	N/A	
January 31	Cancún	Mexico	Moon Palace Resort	N/A	
Sphere 2026
April 16	Las Vegas	United States	Sphere	N/A	
April 17	Las Vegas	United States	Sphere	N/A	
April 18	Las Vegas	United States	Sphere	N/A	
April 23	Las Vegas	United States	Sphere	N/A	
April 24	Las Vegas	United States	Sphere	N/A	
April 25	Las Vegas	United States	Sphere	N/A	
April 30	Las Vegas	United States	Sphere	N/A	
May 1	Las Vegas	United States	Sphere	N/A	
May 2	Las Vegas	United States	Sphere	N/A	
Summer 2026
July 7	Madison	United States	Kohl Center	N/A	
July 8	Madison	United States	Kohl Center	N/A	
July 10	Noblesville	United States	Ruoff Music Center	N/A	
July 11	Noblesville	United States	Ruoff Music Center	N/A	
July 12	Noblesville	United States	Ruoff Music Center	N/A	
July 14	Savannah	United States	Enmarket Arena	N/A	
July 15	Savannah	United States	Enmarket Arena	N/A	
July 17	Raleigh	United States	Coastal Credit Union Music Park	N/A	
July 18	Columbia	United States	Merriweather Post Pavilion	N/A	
July 19	Columbia	United States	Merriweather Post Pavilion	N/A	
July 21	Syracuse	United States	Empower Federal Credit Union Amphitheater	N/A	
July 22	New York City	United States	Madison Square Garden	N/A	
July 24	New York City	United States	Madison Square Garden	N/A	
July 25	New York City	United States	Madison Square Garden	N/A	
July 27	New York City	United States	Madison Square Garden	N/A	
July 29	New York City	United States	Madison Square Garden	N/A	
July 31	Boston	United States	Fenway Park	N/A	
August 1	Boston	United States	Fenway Park	N/A	
September 4	Commerce City	United States	Dick's Sporting Goods Park	N/A	
September 5	Commerce City	United States	Dick's Sporting Goods Park	N/A	
September 6	Commerce City	United States	Dick's Sporting Goods Park	N/A	
Fall 2026
October 2	Atlantic City	United States	Boardwalk Hall	N/A	
October 3	Atlantic City	United States	Boardwalk Hall	N/A	
October 4	Atlantic City	United States	Boardwalk Hall	N/A	
October 6	Richmond	United States	Allianz Amphitheater at Riverfront	N/A	
October 7	Richmond	United States	Allianz Amphitheater at Riverfront	N/A	
October 9	Jacksonville	United States	VyStar Veterans Memorial Arena	N/A	
October 11	Huntsville	United States	Orion Amphitheater	N/A	
October 12 (Note: Originally scheduled for October 10, but was postponed and rescheduled to October 12 due to severe weather.)	Huntsville	United States	Orion Amphitheater	N/A	
New Year's Eve 2026
December 30	New York City	United States	Madison Square Garden	N/A	
December 31	New York City	United States	Madison Square Garden	N/A	

=== 2027 ===
List of 2027 tour dates, showing date, city, country, venue
Date (2027)	City	Country	Venue	Attendance	Gross
New Year's 2027 (continued from 2026)
January 1	New York City	United States	Madison Square Garden	N/A	
January 2	New York City	United States	Madison Square Garden	N/A	
Riviera Maya 2027
January 27	Cancún	Mexico	Moon Palace Resort	N/A	
January 28	Cancún	Mexico	Moon Palace Resort	N/A	
January 29	Cancún	Mexico	Moon Palace Resort	N/A	
January 30	Cancún	Mexico	Moon Palace Resort	N/A	

== Musical costumes ==
Musical costume is a term for the band Phish's elaborate Halloween concerts that involved the band performing an entire album by another artist and including it as the second of three sets. For the 1994 and 1995 Halloween shows, Phish fans were able to vote via newsletter for their choice in which album was to be played. Fans were invited to wear Halloween costumes and take part in costume contests and were given a "Phishbill" which identify the album and the band's relationship to it. Nine official musical costumes have been played by Phish to-date, plus one surprise performance of Pink Floyd's The Dark Side of the Moon on November 2, 1998—just two days after the band performed the music of the Velvet Underground. The band has played a total of sixteen times on Halloween night: 1986, 1987, 1989, 1990, 1991, 1994, 1995, 1996, 1998, 2009, 2010, 2013, 2014, 2016, 2018, and 2021 with special audience participation costume contests being a part of the 1990, 1994, and 2010 shows.

During their comeback year of 2009, Phish performed the Rolling Stones' album Exile on Main Street as part of Phish Festival 8 at Indio, California. In 2010, they covered Little Feat's album Waiting For Columbus in Atlantic City, New Jersey. Four of the Halloween shows have been released in their entirety as a part of the Live Phish Series; 1994's Live Phish Volume 13, which included the cover of the Beatles' White Album; Live Phish 14, which included the 1995 cover of the Who's Quadrophenia; Live Phish 15, which included the 1996 cover of Talking Heads' Remain in Light, and Live Phish 16, which included the 1998 cover of The Velvet Underground's Loaded. Phish has also released the Halloween shows from 1991, 2009, 2010, 2013, 2014, and 2016 separately via their Livephish website.

=== List of musical costumes ===
- 1994: The Beatles by the Beatles
- 1995: Quadrophenia by the Who
- 1996: Remain in Light by Talking Heads
- 1998: Loaded by the Velvet Underground and The Dark Side of the Moon by Pink Floyd
- 2009: Exile on Main Street by the Rolling Stones
- 2010: Waiting for Columbus by Little Feat
- 2013: Wingsuit (later retitled Fuego) by Phish
- 2014: Chilling, Thrilling Sounds of the Haunted House by Walt Disney Records and Laura Olsher
- 2016: The Rise and Fall of Ziggy Stardust and the Spiders from Mars by David Bowie
- 2018: í rokk by Kasvot Vaxt (new material by Phish disguised as an obscure album by a fictional 1980s progressive rock band from Scandinavia)
- 2021: Get More Down by Sci-Fi Soldier (new material by Phish presented as material by a futuristic rock band from the year 4680)

== Tickets by Mail ==
Phish Tickets By Mail (or PTBM) was a service that sold tickets to performances by Phish before their general on-sale date through Ticketmaster and other traditional ticketing outlets. The service exists today in a limited form for concerts involving Trey Anastasio, Mike Gordon, Page McConnell and Jon Fishman. Beginning in the mid-1990s, the Phish ticket presale was done through mail order. For each Phish tour (starting with "taper only" tickets for the December 1994 New Years Run, and both taper and regular tickets for Summer Tour 1995) specific instructions for mail order were listed in the band's newsletter, "Doniac Schvice" (and, later, Phish.com), usually involving envelopes of a specified size, postcards and return postage in the event the ticket order was not fulfilled. There were very specific details that needed to be done, in an effort to deter scalpers and ticket brokers. The ticket orders were then outsourced to a business to fulfill the orders. In the final years of the mail order process, ticket orders were processed by the staff at the Flynn Theatre in Burlington, Vermont. The order in which ticket requests were fulfilled was random, and no seniority or special treatment was given to any fan. These tickets were printed in limited amounts on colored paper with foil and some sort of design, and only issued through mail order.

In 2001, while Phish was on a hiatus, Trey Anastasio booked a tour of amphitheatres and major venues. It was his largest tour, at the time, without Phish. With Phish's management, Dionysian Productions, scaled down during the hiatus, Anastasio and Dionysian used an internet-based ticket presale service run by Musictoday, who has been running a similar service for Dave Matthews Band's Warehouse Fan Association since 1999. Instead of fans filling out postcards, they went to a website, requested shows and put in credit card information. For this tour, the orders were still processed at the Flynn Theatre. This would be the last tour where PTBM would run from Vermont.

When Trey Anastasio went on tour in 2002, he used the Musictoday service again. However, unlike the 2001 tour, the final processing took place at Musictoday's home base in Charlottesville, Virginia. Later that year, when Phish announced their return tour, PTBM used that service as well. All ticket presales for Phish and side projects, from that point on, used Musictoday's online service.

As Phish side-project tours have become smaller following Phish's 2004 disbandment, most presales have been real-time sales, with a first-come-first-served approach in place of the lotteries employed in Phish's touring heyday. With Phish's return to the stage in 2009, the band is once again using Musictoday's online service.

=== Commercial reputation ===
Phish's 2015 tour prices ranged from US$40.00 to $70.00. Shows with special events attached to them tend to run towards the higher end of the spectrum given that they typically have an extra set of music included in the show.

== Sources ==
The first Phish concert setlist archive was "The Helping Phriendly Book," a section of the fan-made Phish.net website unveiled on the Internet in 1991. Two books, The Pharmer's Almanac and The Phish Companion, contained detailed collections of Phish setlists, the first having appeared in six volumes between 1995 and 2000 and the latter releasing a third volume in 2016.

== See also ==
- List of Phish songs
