= Live Phish Japan Relief =

Japan Relief

Live album by Phish
- Released: April 15, 2011
- Recorded: July 31, 1999
- Venue: Fuji Rock Festival, Japan
- Genre: Progressive rock, jam, jazz-rock
- Label: JEMP

Japan Relief is an archival live album release by the American rock band Phish. The show was recorded on July 31, 1999 during one of Phish's performances at that year's Fuji Rock Festival at the Naeba Ski Resort in Niigata Prefecture, Japan. All proceeds from this show were sent to the Peace Winds America and their Japanese relief program, Peace Winds Japan, following the 2011 Tōhoku earthquake and tsunami. The show was later made available through Phish's LivePhish website in limited CD format as well as through MP3 and lossless download format.

The Fuji Rock Festival marked the first time Phish would play in Japan. Phish archivist said about the show "The July 31st show crackled with energy, intermingling classic and new material with an exploratory vibe that meshed with the atmosphere of respect and beauty." The show features tibetan musician, Nawang Khechog, who spoke about Tibetan human rights before performing on Universal Horn/Vacuum Jam and Brian And Robert playing tibetan horn and wood flute.

== Track listing ==
=== Set One ===
1. "My Friend, My Friend" (Anastasio/Marshall)
2. "Golgi Apparatus" (Anastasio/Marshall/Szuter/Woolf)
3. "Back On The Train" (Anastasio/Marshall)
4. "Limb By Limb" (Anastasio/Marshall/Herman)
5. "Free" (Anastasio/Marshall)
6. "Roggae" (Anastasio/Fishman/Gordon/McConnell/Marshall)
7. "Sparkle" (Anastasio/Marshall)
8. "Character Zero" (Anastasio/Marshall)

=== Set Two ===
1. "2001" (Deodato)
2. "David Bowie" (Anastasio)
3. "Wading In The Velvet Sea" (Anastasio/Marshall)
4. "Prince Caspian" (Anastasio/Marshall)
5. "Fluffhead" (Anastasio/Pollak)
6. "The Squirming Coil" (Anastasio/Marshall)

=== Encore ===
1. "Nawang Khechog Speech"
2. "Universal Horn/Vacuum Jam" (Khechog/Fishman)
3. "Brian And Robert" (Anastasio/Marshall)
4. "Simple" (Gordon)

=== Filler ===
1. "What's The Use?" - from 7/29/99 Soundcheck (Anastasio/Fishman/Gordon/McConnell)

== Personnel ==
- Trey Anastasio – guitars, lead vocals, co-lead vocals on "Roggae"
- Page McConnell – piano, organ, backing vocals, co-lead vocals on "Roggae"
- Mike Gordon – bass, backing vocals, co-lead vocals on "Roggae"
- Jon Fishman – drums, backing vocals, co-lead vocals on "Roggae", vacuum on "Universal Horn/Vacuum Jam"
- Nawang Khechog – speech on "Nawang Khechog Speech", Tibetan horn on "Universal Horn/Vacuum Jam", wood flute on "Brian and Robert"
