= Live Phish 04.03.98 =

Live album by Phish
- Released: June 29, 2005
- Recorded: April 3, 1998
- Genre: Rock, funk rock, jazz-funk
- Length: 157:26; 43:42 (Filler)
- Label: Phish Archives
- Producer: Phish

Phish chronology
Live Phish 04.02.98 (2005)	Live Phish 04.03.98 (2005)	Live Phish 04.04.98 (2005)

LivePhish.com Downloads series chronology
Live Phish Downloads: 04.02.98 (2005)	Live Phish Downloads: 04.03.98 (2005)	Live Phish Downloads: 04.04.98 (2005)

Alternative covers
- LivePhish.com Downloads cover

Live Phish 04.03.98 is a live album by American rock group Phish, which was recorded live at the Nassau Coliseum in Uniondale, New York, on April 3, 1998, which serves as the second night of the band's four-night "Island Tour".

The short mini-run quickly became one of the most popular Phish performances of all time, with the band mixing the funk of 1997 with the high-energy jams of the mid-1990s along with brand new compositions.

The second and final night of shows in New York is highlighted by a large-scale jam following Ween's "Roses are Free", rated by Phish fans as one of the group's greatest jams of all time. Other highlights include a fan running onstage during "Loving Cup" and being tackled by stage manager Pete Carini, all of which is reported during "Run Like an Antelope" by guitarist Trey Anastasio, who then rightfully begins the encore with a version of "Carini".

Bonus tracks include various soundcheck excerpts from the "Island Tour"

In addition to being a CD release, this concert is available as a download in FLAC and MP3 formats at LivePhish.com.

== Track listing ==
Disc one

Set one:

1. "Mike's Song" (Gordon) – 14:19 →
2. "The Old Home Place" (Jayne, Webb) – 3:41 →
3. "Weekapaug Groove" (Anastasio, Fishman, Gordon, McConnell) – 16:27
4. "Train Song" (Gordon, Linitz) – 2:59
5. "Billy Breathes" (Anastasio) – 7:38
6. "Beauty of My Dreams" (McCoury) – 2:41
7. "Dogs Stole Things" (Anastasio, Marshall) – 5:00 →
8. "Reba" (Anastasio) – 16:41
9. "My Soul" (Chenier) – 8:27

Disc two

Set two:

1. "Roses Are Free" (Freeman, Melchiondo) – 5:33 →
2. "Nassau Jam" (Anastasio, Fishman, Gordon, McConnell) – 21:56 →
3. "Piper" (Anastasio, Marshall) – 16:13 →
4. "Loving Cup" (Jagger, Richards) – 6:53 →
5. "Run Like an Antelope" (Anastasio, Marshall, Pollak) – 14:43

Disc three

Encore:

1. "Carini" (Anastasio, Fishman, Gordon, McConnell) – 4:36 →
2. "Halley's Comet" (Wright) – 6:15 →
3. "Tweezer Reprise" (Anastasio, Fishman, Gordon, McConnell) – 3:24

April 2, 1998 – Soundcheck:

4. "Funky Bitch" (Seals) – 3:38 →
5. "Nassau Soundcheck Jam" (Anastasio, Fishman, Gordon, McConnell) – 5:55 →
6. "Birds of a Feather" (Anastasio, Fishman, Gordon, Marshall, McConnell) – 10:08

April 4, 1998 – Soundcheck:

7. "Providence Soundcheck Jam" (Anastasio, Fishman, Gordon, McConnell) – 9:10
8. "Shafty" (Anastasio, Fishman, Gordon, Marshall, McConnell) – 15:23
9. "Roggae" (Anastasio, Fishman, Gordon, Marshall, McConnell) – 5:23

== Personnel ==
- Trey Anastasio – guitars, lead vocals, co-lead vocals on "Roggae"
- Page McConnell – piano, organ, backing vocals, co-lead vocals on "Roggae"
- Mike Gordon – bass, backing vocals, lead vocals on "Mike's Song", "The Old Home Place", "Train Song", "Beauty of My Dreams" and "Funky Bitch", co-lead vocals on "Roggae"
- Jon Fishman – drums, backing vocals, co-lead vocals on "Roggae"
