= Ventura (Phish album) =

Live album by Phish
- Released: June 18, 2013
- Recorded: July 30, 1997; July 20, 1998
- Genre: Rock
- Label: JEMP
- Producer: Phish

Phish chronology
Chicago '94 (2012)	Ventura (2013)	Niagara Falls (2013)

Ventura is a live album by the rock band Phish. It contains two complete concerts on six CDs. It was recorded on July 30, 1997, and July 20, 1998, at the Ventura County Fairgrounds in Ventura, California. Packaged as a box set, it was released by JEMP Records on June 18, 2013.

== Critical reception ==
Professional ratings
Review scores
Source	Rating
Allmusic	3.5/5 stars

On Allmusic, Stephen Thomas Erlewine said, ". . . both [concerts] arrived during the two-year gap separating 1996's Billy Breathes and 1998's The Story of the Ghost — two years where the band's popularity was on the rise and it certainly seemed like a crossover was perhaps within their sites [sic]. That crossover never happened and these two shows indicate the band never seriously thought about moving into the mainstream, preferring to ride a sweet, hazy, sun-soaked vibe that fits Southern California in the late summer. A few covers surface . . . and soundcheck jams round out the third disc of each show, but the appeal of Ventura is, as always, how Phish tackle their core catalog . . ."

On All About Jazz, Doug Collette wrote, "The relative comfort level [of a particular venue] can inspire or relax a bit too much, and both dynamics are on display over the course of these six compact discs.... Though not all the music is as vivid as the evocative wrap-round inside and outside graphics, the most memorable moments are nevertheless compelling. . . . During set two of '97, as the band wends its way into "Free", drummer Jon Fishman hits harder, bassist Mike Gordon holds back to hit only bedrock notes, guitarist Trey Anastasio redefines shredding, and all the while keyboardist Page McConnell frames the increasingly subtle four-way dynamics. A circular segue through "David Bowie" and Talking Heads' "Cities" is a singularity the like of which distinguishes Phish to this day: four virtually equally skilled players simultaneously inspiring each other to increasingly intense heights of improvisation."

== Track listing ==
=== Disc one ===
July 30, 1997 – first set:

1. "NICU" (Anastasio, Marshall) – 6:06
2. "Wolfman's Brother" (Anastasio, Fishman, Gordon, Marshall, McConnell) – 11:59
3. "Chalk Dust Torture" (Anastasio, Marshall) – 11:07
4. "Water in the Sky" (Anastasio, Marshall) – 4:11
5. "Stash" (Anastasio, Marshall) – 15:23
6. "Weigh" (Gordon) – 5:08
7. "Piper" (Anastasio, Marshall) – 5:06
8. "Cars Trucks Buses" (McConnell) – 4:49
9. "Character Zero" (Anastasio, Marshall) – 9:20

=== Disc two ===
July 30, 1997 – second set:

1. "Punch You in the Eye" (Anastasio) – 8:56
2. "Free" (Anastasio, Marshall) – 11:16
3. "David Bowie" (Anastasio) – 21:29
4. "Cities" (Byrne) – 5:29
5. "David Bowie" (Anastasio) – 6:08

=== Disc three ===
July 30, 1997 – second set, continued:

1. "Bouncing Around the Room" (Anastasio, Marshall) – 3:54
2. "Uncle Pen" (Monroe) – 4:14
3. "Prince Caspian" (Anastasio, Marshall) – 8:55
4. "Fire" (Hendrix) – 6:51

July 30, 1997 – encore:

5. "My Soul" (Chenier) – 6:02

July 30, 1997 – sound check:

6. "Ventura '97 Soundcheck Jam" (Anastasio, Fishman, Gordon, McConnell) – 9:18

=== Disc four ===
July 20, 1998 – first set:

1. "Bathtub Gin" (Anastasio, Goodman) – 21:55
2. "Dirt" (Anastasio, Herman, Marshall) – 4:02
3. "Poor Heart" (Gordon) – 3:51
4. "Lawn Boy" (Anastasio, Marshall) – 3:04
5. "My Sweet One" (Fishman) – 3:05
6. "Birds of a Feather" (Anastasio, Fishman, Gordon, Marshall, McConnell) – 6:19
7. "Theme from the Bottom" (Anastasio, Fishman, Gordon, Marshall, McConnell) – 9:29
8. "Water in the Sky" (Anastasio, Marshall) – 2:47
9. "The Moma Dance" (Anastasio, Fishman, Gordon, Marshall, McConnell) – 9:56
10. "Split Open and Melt" (Anastasio) – 14:00

=== Disc five ===
July 20, 1998 – second set:

1. "Drowned" (Townshend) – 14:52
2. "Makisupa Policeman" (Anastasio, Marshall) – 8:08
3. "Maze" (Anastasio, Marshall) – 12:10
4. "Sea and Sand" (Townshend) – 3:10
5. "Prince Caspian" (Anastasio, Marshall) – 12:11
6. "Harry Hood" (Anastasio, Fishman, Gordon, Long, McConnell) – 15:31

=== Disc six ===
July 20, 1998 – encore:

1. "Sexual Healing" (Brown, Gaye, Ritz) – 7:48
2. "Hold Your Head Up" (Argent, White) – 1:41
3. "Halley's Comet" (Wright) – 10:58

July 20, 1998 – sound check:

4. "Ventura '98 Soundcheck Jam" (Anastasio, Fishman, Gordon, McConnell) – 13:38

== Personnel ==
=== Phish ===
- Trey Anastasio – guitar, lead vocals (all tracks except where noted), drums on "Sexual Healing" and "Hold Your Head Up"
- Page McConnell – keyboards, backing vocals, lead vocals on "Lawn Boy" and "Sea and Sand"
- Mike Gordon – bass, backing vocals, lead vocals on "Weigh", "Uncle Pen", "Poor Heart" and "Drowned"
- Jon Fishman – drums, backing vocals, lead vocals on "The Moma Dance" and "Sexual Healing"

=== Production ===
- Produced by Phish
- Engineering: Paul Languedoc
- Mixing: Jon Altschiller
- Mastering: Fred Kevorkian
- Post production: Kevin Shapiro
- Art direction: Julia Mordaunt
