= Live Phish Volume 16 =

Live Phish Vol. 16

Live album by Phish
- Released: October 29, 2002
- Recorded: October 31, 1998
- Genre: Rock
- Length: 3:37:49; 1:18:23 (Filler)
- Label: Elektra
- Producer: Phish

Live Phish Series chronology
Live Phish Volume 15 (2002)	Live Phish Volume 16 (2002)	Live Phish Volume 17 (2003)

Professional ratings
Review scores
Source	Rating
Allmusic	3/5 stars

Live Phish Vol. 16 is a live album by Vermont-based jam band Phish released on October 29, 2002. It was recorded live at Thomas and Mack Center located on the campus of the University of Nevada, Las Vegas, in Paradise, Nevada on Halloween night, 1998.

It marks the fourth Halloween show in which Phish dressed up in a "musical costume" by performing an album from another artist in its entirety. On this night, the band unveiled a complete performance of the Velvet Underground's Loaded sandwiched between two sets of Phish's own music.

This performance is the only Halloween performance that sees Phish straying away from the album's original format, instead embarking on several extended improvisational jams throughout the set. Two of the album's songs - "Lonesome Cowboy Bill" and "Sweet Jane" - had already been performed by Phish in concert. The group later admitted that they could not fully decide on a choice for the 1998 Halloween album so they decided to go with an album that they already knew for the most part.

Fan reaction was mixed as many were not familiar with the album, although "Rock & Roll" would later become a Phish concert staple.

Disc four is a bonus disc recorded the night before as part of the band's 15th-anniversary celebration.

Though it is not the longest concert in the series, this is the longest volume in the Live Phish Series with the bonus disc bringing the total length to just under five hours.

== Track listing ==
=== Disc one ===
Set one:

1. "Axilla I" (Anastasio, Herman, Marshall) - 3:58
2. "Punch You in the Eye" (Anastasio) - 9:06
3. "Roggae" (Anastasio, Fishman, Gordon, Marshall, McConnell) - 8:48
4. "Birds of a Feather" (Anastasio, Fishman, Gordon, Marshall, McConnell) - 7:21
5. "Sneakin' Sally Thru the Alley" (Toussaint) - 10:56
6. "Chalk Dust Torture" (Anastasio, Marshall) - 8:22
7. "Lawn Boy" (Anastasio, Marshall) - 3:07
8. "Mike's Song" (Gordon) - 9:27
9. "Frankie Says" (Anastasio, Fishman, Gordon, Marshall, McConnell) - 5:12
10. "Weekapaug Groove" (Anastasio, Fishman, Gordon, McConnell) - 12:16

=== Disc two ===
Set two:

1. "Who Loves the Sun" (Reed) - 3:33
2. "Sweet Jane" (Reed) - 8:15
3. "Rock & Roll" (Reed) - 13:46
4. "Cool It Down" (Reed) - 7:14
5. "New Age" (Reed) - 8:35
6. "Head Held High" (Reed) - 4:21
7. "Lonesome Cowboy Bill" (Reed) - 10:14
8. "I Found a Reason" (Reed) - 4:34
9. "Train Round the Bend" (Reed) - 6:50
10. "Oh! Sweet Nuthin'" (Reed) - 9:17

=== Disc three ===
Set three:

1. "Wolfman's Brother" (Anastasio, Fishman, Gordon, Marshall, McConnell) - 30:43
2. "Piper" (Anastasio, Marshall) - 13:03
3. "Ghost" (Anastasio, Marshall) - 9:07

Encore:

4. "Sleeping Monkey" (Anastasio, Marshall) - 5:52
5. "Tweezer Reprise" (Anastasio, Fishman, Gordon, McConnell) - 3:53

=== Disc four ===
Filler (October 30, 1998, Thomas & Mack Center, Las Vegas, Nevada):

1. "Run Like an Antelope" (Anastasio, Marshall, Pollak) - 17:07
2. "Stash" (Anastasio, Marshall) - 7:51
3. "Manteca" (Fuller, Gillespie, Pozo) - 3:26
4. "Tweezer" (Anastasio, Fishman, Gordon, McConnell) - 16:33
5. "NICU" (Anastasio, Marshall) - 9:43
6. "Prince Caspian" (Anastasio, Marshall) - 8:35
7. "Golgi Apparatus" (Anastasio, Marshall, Szuter, Woolf) - 6:09
8. "Driver" (Anastasio, Marshall) - 4:42
9. "Free Bird" (Collins, Van Zant) - 4:19

== Personnel ==
- Trey Anastasio - guitars, lead vocals, co-lead vocals on "Roggae" and "I Found a Reason"
- Page McConnell - piano, organ, backing vocals, co-lead vocals on "Roggae", lead vocals on "Lawn Boy", "Frankie Says", "Sweet Jane", "Rock & Roll" and "Oh! Sweet Nuthin'"
- Mike Gordon - bass, backing vocals, co-lead vocals on "Roggae" and "I Found a Reason", lead vocals on "Mike's Song" and "Train Round the Bend"
- Jon Fishman - drums, backing vocals, co-lead vocals on "Roggae", lead vocals on "Lonesome Cowboy Bill"
