= Live Phish 04.02.98 =

Live album by Phish
- Released: June 29, 2005
- Recorded: April 2, 1998
- Genre: Rock, funk rock, jazz-funk
- Length: 2:38:25
- Label: Phish Archives
- Producer: Phish

Phish chronology
Live Phish 07.29.03 (2003)	Live Phish 04.02.98 (2005)	Live Phish 04.03.98 (2005)

LivePhish.com Downloads series chronology
Live Phish Downloads: 12.01.94 (2005)	Live Phish Downloads: 04.02.98 (2005)	Live Phish Downloads: 04.03.98 (2005)

Alternative covers
- LivePhish.com Downloads cover

Live Phish 04.02.98 is a live album by American rock group Phish, which was recorded live at the Nassau Coliseum in Uniondale, New York, on April 2, 1998, which serves as the first night of the band's four-night "Island Tour" ,

The short mini-run quickly became one of the most popular Phish performances of all time, with the band mixing the funk of 1997 with the high-energy jams of the mid-1990s along with brand new compositions.

Highlights include a 20-minute "Stash", an 18-minute "Twist", "Wolfman's Brother" -> "Sneakin' Sally Through the Alley", and the debut of "Frankie Says" and "Birds of a Feather".

In addition to being a CD release, this concert is available as a download in FLAC and MP3 formats at LivePhish.com.

== Track listing ==
Disc one

Set one:

1. "Tube" (Anastasio, Fishman) - 8:27
2. "My Mind's Got a Mind of Its Own" (Hancock) - 2:36
3. "The Sloth" (Anastasio) - 3:56
4. "NICU" (Anastasio, Marshall) - 6:21
5. "Stash" (Anastasio, Marshall) - 19:27 →
6. "Horn" (Anastasio, Marshall) - 3:50 →
7. "Waste" (Anastasio, Marshall) - 5:28 →
8. "Chalk Dust Torture" (Anastasio, Marshall) - 11:15

Disc two

Set two:

1. "Punch You in the Eye" (Anastasio) - 10:25 →
2. "Simple" (Gordon) - 10:11 →
3. "Birds of a Feather" (Anastasio, Fishman, Gordon, Marshall, McConnell) - 9:59

Disc three

Set two, continued:

1. "Wolfman's Brother" (Anastasio, Fishman, Gordon, Marshall, McConnell) - 9:28 →
2. "Sneakin' Sally Thru the Alley" (Toussaint) - 12:39 →
3. "Frankie Says" (Anastasio, Fishman, Gordon, Marshall, McConnell) - 5:18 →
4. "Twist" (Anastasio, Marshall) - 18:34 →
5. "Sleeping Monkey" (Anastasio, Marshall) - 6:04 →
6. "Rocky Top" (Bryant, Bryant) - 3:35

Encore:

7. "Guyute" (Anastasio, Marshall) - 10:52

== Personnel ==
- Trey Anastasio - guitars, lead vocals
- Page McConnell - piano, organ, backing vocals, lead vocals on "Frankie Says"
- Mike Gordon - bass, backing vocals, lead vocals on "My Mind's Got a Mind of Its Own" and "Rocky Top"
- Jon Fishman - drums, backing vocals
