= Hampton Comes Alive =

Live album by Phish
- Released: November 23, 1999 (U.S.)
- Recorded: November 20–21, 1998
- Genres: Jam rock, alternative rock
- Length: 314:08
- Label: Elektra
- Producer: Bryce Goggin

Phish chronology
| The Story of the Ghost (1998) | Hampton Comes Alive (1999) | The Siket Disc (1999) |

Professional ratings
Review scores
| Source | Rating |
|---|---|
| Allmusic | 4.5/5 stars |

Hampton Comes Alive is a six-disc live album by the American rock band Phish, released on November 23, 1999, by Elektra Records. It is the band's third live album and the first time complete live Phish concerts were released in their entirety (though fan recordings of most Phish shows are widely circulated). Hampton Comes Alive consists of two full concerts recorded on November 20 and 21, 1998, at the Hampton Coliseum in Hampton, Virginia. The album title is a play on Peter Frampton's classic live album Frampton Comes Alive!.

Twenty of the album's forty-five tracks are covers or other songs from the band's large catalog that do not appear on any previous Phish album. The album's many cover songs include: "Rock and Roll, Pt. 2" by Gary Glitter, "Quinn the Eskimo (The Mighty Quinn)" by Bob Dylan, "Funky Bitch" by Son Seals, "Roses Are Free" by Ween, "Gettin' Jiggy Wit It" by Will Smith, "Cry Baby Cry" by The Beatles, "Boogie On Reggae Woman" by Stevie Wonder, "Nellie Kane" by Hot Rize, "Bold as Love" by The Jimi Hendrix Experience, "Sabotage" by Beastie Boys and "Tubthumping" by Chumbawamba. As usual with covers sung by Jon Fishman, the band (as a trio with Trey Anastasio on drums) also performs a brief instrumental version of "Hold Your Head Up" by Argent before and after "Gettin' Jiggy Wit It." The album marked the first time that the songs "Tube", "Driver", "Axilla I", "Possum", "Piper", "Farmhouse", "Big Black Furry Creature from Mars", "NICU", "Dogs Stole Things" and "Ha Ha Ha" had appeared on an official Phish release. "Piper" and "Farmhouse" later appeared on the band's 2000 album Farmhouse.

Each CD is packaged in its own sleeve and collected together in an innovative box. The liner notes include fan-contributed photographs and art. The album was nominated for a Grammy for Best Boxed Set Packaging.

Hampton Comes Alive was certified gold by RIAA January 14, 2000.

In February 2009, this album was made available as a download in FLAC and MP3 formats at LivePhish.com.

== Track listing ==
=== Disc one ===
November 20, 1998 – Set one
| No. | Title | Writer(s) | Length |
|---|---|---|---|
| 1. | "Rock and Roll, Part 2 →" | Gary Glitter; Mike Leander | 2:04 |
| 2. | "Tube →" | Trey Anastasio; Jon Fishman | 4:13 |
| 3. | "Quinn the Eskimo (The Mighty Quinn) →" | Bob Dylan | 4:29 |
| 4. | "Funky Bitch" | Son Seals | 6:38 |
| 5. | "Guelah Papyrus" | Anastasio; Tom Marshall | 6:12 |
| 6. | "Rift" | Anastasio; Marshall | 5:59 |
| 7. | "Meat →" | Anastasio; Fishman; Mike Gordon; Page McConnell; Marshall | 6:17 |
| 8. | "Stash" | Anastasio; Marshall | 12:45 |

=== Disc two ===
November 20, 1998 – Set one, continued
| No. | Title | Writer(s) | Length |
|---|---|---|---|
| 1. | "Train Song →" | Gordon; Joseph Linitz | 3:31 |
| 2. | "Possum" | Jeff Holdsworth | 10:03 |
| 3. | "Roggae" | Anastasio; Fishman; Gordon; McConnell; Marshall | 8:15 |
| 4. | "Driver" | Anastasio; Marshall | 3:58 |
| 5. | "Split Open and Melt" | Anastasio | 12:51 |

=== Disc three ===
November 20, 1998 – Set two
| No. | Title | Writer(s) | Length |
|---|---|---|---|
| 1. | "Bathtub Gin →" | Anastasio; Susannah Goodman | 14:13 |
| 2. | "Piper" | Anastasio; Marshall | 7:05 |
| 3. | "Axilla →" | Anastasio; Marshall | 4:43 |
| 4. | "Roses Are Free" | Aaron Freeman; Mickey Melchiondo | 5:22 |
| 5. | "Farmhouse" | Anastasio; Marshall | 4:59 |
| 6. | "Gettin' Jiggy wit It (Note: Song is preceded and followed by an instrumental cover of the Argent song "Hold Your Head Up".)" | Will Smith; Samuel Barnes; Bernard Edwards; Nile Rodgers; Joe Robinson | 7:13 |
| 7. | "Harry Hood →" | Anastasio; Fishman; Gordon; McConnell; Brian Long | 12:49 |
| 8. | "Character Zero" | Anastasio; Marshall | 7:38 |

November 20, 1998 – Encore
| No. | Title | Writer(s) | Length |
|---|---|---|---|
| 9. | "Cavern" | Anastasio; Scott Herman; Marshall | 4:48 |

=== Disc four ===
November 21, 1998 – Set one
| No. | Title | Writer(s) | Length |
|---|---|---|---|
| 1. | "Wilson →" | Anastasio; Marshall; Aaron Woolf | 7:03 |
| 2. | "Big Black Furry Creature from Mars" | Gordon | 5:09 |
| 3. | "Lawn Boy" | Anastasio; Marshall | 2:50 |
| 4. | "Divided Sky" | Anastasio | 15:12 |
| 5. | "Cry Baby Cry →" | John Lennon; Paul McCartney | 3:06 |
| 6. | "Boogie On Reggae Woman →" | Stevie Wonder | 6:13 |
| 7. | "NICU" | Anastasio; Marshall | 5:34 |

=== Disc five ===
November 21, 1998 – Set one, continued
| No. | Title | Writer(s) | Length |
|---|---|---|---|
| 1. | "Dogs Stole Things" | Anastasio; Marshall | 4:35 |
| 2. | "Nellie Kane" | Tim O'Brien | 3:20 |
| 3. | "Foam" | Anastasio | 9:51 |
| 4. | "Wading in the Velvet Sea" | Anastasio; Marshall | 6:30 |
| 5. | "Guyute" | Anastasio; Marshall | 10:17 |
| 6. | "Bold as Love" | Jimi Hendrix | 6:46 |

=== Disc six ===
November 21, 1998 – Set two
| No. | Title | Writer(s) | Length |
|---|---|---|---|
| 1. | "Sabotage →" | Michael Diamond; Adam Horovitz; Adam Yauch | 3:08 |
| 2. | "Mike's Song →" | Gordon | 11:51 |
| 3. | "Simple →" | Gordon | 15:28 |
| 4. | "The Wedge →" | Anastasio; Marshall | 5:56 |
| 5. | "The Mango Song →" | Anastasio | 7:44 |
| 6. | "Free →" | Anastasio; Marshall | 4:48 |
| 7. | "Ha Ha Ha →" | Fishman | 1:34 |
| 8. | "Free" | Anastasio; Marshall | 5:15 |
| 9. | "Weekapaug Groove" | Anastasio; Fishman; Gordon; McConnell | 8:36 |

November 21, 1998 – Encore
| No. | Title | Writer(s) | Length |
|---|---|---|---|
| 10. | "Tubthumping" | Jude Abbott; Dunstan Bruce; Paul Greco; Harry Hamer; Danbert Nobacon; Alice Nutter; Lou Watts; Boff Whalley | 5:20 |

== Personnel ==
Phish

- Trey Anastasio – guitars, lead vocals, drums on "Gettin' Jiggy wit It"
- Page McConnell – keyboards, backing vocals, lead vocals on "Lawn Boy", "Wading in the Velvet Sea" and "Bold as Love", co-lead vocals on "Rift", "Meat" and "Roggae"
- Mike Gordon – bass guitar, backing vocals, lead vocals on "Quinn the Eskimo", "Funky Bitch", "Train Song", "Possum", "Nellie Kane" and "Mike's Song", co-lead vocals on "Meat" and "Roggae"
- Jon Fishman – drums, backing vocals, lead vocals on "Gettin' Jiggy wit It", co-lead vocals on "Meat" and "Roggae"

Additional musicians:

- Carl Gerhard - trumpet on "Cavern" and "Tubthumping"
- Tom Marshall - lead vocals on "Tubthumping"
