= Live Phish 04.04.98 =

Live album by Phish (Live Series)
- Released: June 29, 2005
- Recorded: April 4, 1998
- Genre: Rock, funk rock, jazz-funk
- Length: 2:54:37
- Label: Phish Archives
- Producer: Phish

Phish (Live Series) chronology
Live Phish 04.03.98 (2005)	Live Phish 04.04.98 (2005)	Live Phish 04.05.98 (2005)

LivePhish.com Downloads series chronology
Live Phish Downloads: 04.03.98 (2005)	Live Phish Downloads: 04.04.98 (2005)	Live Phish Downloads: 04.05.98 (2005)

Alternative covers
- LivePhish.com Downloads cover

Live Phish 04.04.98 is a live album by American rock group Phish, which was recorded live at the Providence Civic Center in Providence, Rhode Island, on April 4, 1998, which serves as the third night of the four-night "Island Tour",

The short mini-run quickly became one of the most popular Phish performances of all time, with the band mixing the funk of 1997 with the high-energy jams of the mid-1990s along with brand new compositions.

The first show in Rhode Island will always be remembered for its extended jams (even "Birds of a Feather" clocked in at 15 minutes). Highlights include a heavy, energetic 18-minute "Ghost" and one of the most celebrated versions of "Harry Hood" of the late 1990s. After a 12-minute "Brother", guitarist Trey Anastasio says the band will now play the "radio friendly" version, resulting in a humorous ten-second version of the song. Before the band played the next song, "Ghost", they inform the audience that the song is "radio un-friendly, because it's really long, and really slow".

In addition to being a CD release, this concert is available as a download in FLAC and MP3 formats at LivePhish.com.

== Track listing ==
Disc one

Set one:

1. "Tweezer" (Anastasio, Fishman, Gordon, McConnell) – 16:58 →
2. "Taste" (Anastasio, Fishman, Gordon, Marshall, McConnell) – 11:07
3. "Bouncing Around the Room" (Anastasio, Marshall) – 3:49
4. "Funky Bitch" (Seals) – 6:57
5. "Ginseng Sullivan" (Blake) – 4:35
6. "Limb by Limb" (Anastasio, Herman, Marshall) – 10:06
7. "Lawn Boy" (Anastasio, Marshall) – 2:59
8. "Character Zero" (Anastasio, Marshall) – 8:31

Disc two

Set two:

1. "Birds of a Feather" (Anastasio, Fishman, Gordon, Marshall, McConnell) – 15:57 →
2. "2001" (Deodato) – 16:40 →
3. "Brother" (Anastasio, Fishman, Gordon, McConnell) – 12:35
4. "Brother" (Anastasio, Fishman, Gordon, McConnell) – 1:02

Disc three

Set two, continued:

1. "Ghost" (Anastasio, Marshall) – 17:49 →
2. "The Lizards" (Anastasio) – 12:27
3. "David Bowie" (Anastasio) – 16:25

Encore:

4. "Harry Hood" (Anastasio, Fishman, Gordon, Long, McConnell) – 16:40

== Personnel ==
- Trey Anastasio – guitars, lead vocals
- Page McConnell – piano, organ, backing vocals, lead vocals on "Lawn Boy"
- Mike Gordon – bass, backing vocals, lead vocals on "Funky Bitch" and "Ginseng Sullivan"
- Jon Fishman – drums, backing vocals, co-lead vocals on "Taste"
