= The Victor Disc =

Studio album (bootleg) by Phish
- Released: Unreleased
- Recorded: December 19, 2002
- Genres: Instrumental rock, jam
- Length: 1:10:58

Phish chronology
Round Room (2002)	The Victor Disc (Unreleased)	Undermind (2004)

The Victor Disc is an instrumental studio album by the American band Phish. The material was recorded December 19, 2002, at LoHo Studios in New York during an impromptu jam session after the band's appearance on the Late Show with David Letterman. Recorded between the release of Round Room and Phish's return to the stage on New Year's Eve 2002 after a 2 1/2-year break, The Victor Disc provides an intimate glimpse of the band "in a stripped down, unpolished studio setting".

Like The Siket Disc before it, The Victor Disc was named after the session's recording engineer. The album was announced in Rolling Stone's 2003 Phish cover story, as follows:

Phish have already made another new album. They did it even before they got to the Garden—on December 19, while they were in New York to appear on Late Show With David Letterman. Anastasio and McConnell popped into a downtown recording studio sometime after midnight, decided to play, and phoned Fishman and Gordon back at the hotel, asking them to join. Phish then taped an hour and a half of spontaneous playing, decided on a title (The Victor Disc, named after the session's engineer) and came up with a cover idea.

The Victor Disc has not yet been officially released. All or part of the album, however, was later leaked on the internet, and has circulated widely among fans.

== Track listing ==
All tracks by Phish. Track titles are unconfirmed.

1. "Lazy and Red" - 5:57
2. "Den of Iniquity" - 9:55
3. "Bubble Wrap" - 4:34
4. "Sky Train Wand" - 17:24
5. "Blue Over Yellow" - 15:30
6. "Guantanamo Strut" - 17:22

In addition to these six mastered tracks, fan-traded filesets also often include four additional tracks that appear to be part of the raw session recordings, from which the album tracks were excerpted. These raw tracks are titled: "Victor Jam Session", "Heartache", "35 Minute Jam", and "Last Victor Jam".

== Personnel ==
Phish

- Trey Anastasio - guitars
- Page McConnell - keyboards
- Mike Gordon - bass guitar
- Jon Fishman - drums
