= Live Phish 04.05.98 =

Live album by Phish (Live Series)
- Released: June 29, 2005
- Recorded: April 5, 1998
- Genre: Rock, funk rock, jazz-funk
- Length: 2:51:02
- Label: Phish Archives
- Producer: Phish

Phish (Live Series) chronology
Live Phish 04.04.98 (2005)	Live Phish 04.05.98 (2005)

LivePhish.com Downloads series chronology
Live Phish Downloads: 04.04.98 (2005)	Live Phish Downloads: 04.05.98 (2005)	Live Phish Downloads: 04.26.96 & 11.07.91 (2005)

Alternative covers
- LivePhish.com Downloads cover

Live Phish 04.05.98 is a live album by American rock group Phish, which was recorded live at the Providence Civic Center in Providence, Rhode Island, on April 5, 1998, which serves as the final night of the four-night "Island Tour". The short mini-run quickly became one of the most popular Phish performances of all time, with the band mixing the funk of 1997 with the high-energy jams of the mid-1990s along with brand new compositions.

Highlights include a 16-minute "Down with Disease", as well as a funky second set that features a slow, funked out version of "Cavern" that evolves out of a jam developed in "Possum". Additionally, "Shafty" made its concert debut this night. The band expands on "Cavern" well into the 13-minute mark, a song that is usually about four minutes long in concert.

This would be the last Phish concert until their return to Europe in July.

In addition to being a CD release, this concert is available as a download in FLAC and MP3 formats at LivePhish.com.

== Track listing ==
Disc one

Set one:

1. "The Oh Kee Pa Ceremony" (Anastasio) – 2:23 →
2. "You Enjoy Myself" (Anastasio) – 25:53
3. "Theme from the Bottom" (Anastasio, Fishman, Gordon, Marshall, McConnell) – 10:35 →
4. "McGrupp and the Watchful Hosemasters" (Anastasio, Marshall) - 10:28 →

Disc two

Set one, continued:

1. "Bathtub Gin" (Anastasio, Goodman) – 11:25 →
2. "Cities" (Byrne) – 10:36 →
3. "Sparkle" (Anastasio, Marshall) – 4:25 →
4. "Split Open and Melt" (Anastasio) – 11:58

Set two:

5. "Down with Disease" (Anastasio, Marshall) – 16:30

Disc three

Set two, continued:

1. "Ya Mar" (Ferguson) – 14:19 →
2. "Prince Caspian" (Anastasio, Marshall) – 11:20 →
3. "Maze" (Anastasio, Marshall) – 8:05 →
4. "Shafty" (Anastasio, Fishman, Gordon, Marshall, McConnell) – 5:04 →
5. "Possum" (Holdsworth) – 8:23 →
6. "Cavern" (Anastasio, Herman, Marshall) – 12:57

Encore:

7. "Bold as Love" (Hendrix) – 6:41

== Personnel ==
- Trey Anastasio – guitars, lead vocals
- Page McConnell – piano, organ, backing vocals, lead vocals on "Bold as Love"
- Mike Gordon – bass, backing vocals, lead vocals on "Ya Mar"
- Jon Fishman – drums, backing vocals
