= Live Bait Vol.01 - Summer 2010 Leg 1 =

Album by Phish

Live Bait Vol. 01 - Summer 2010 Leg 1

Live album by Phish
- Released: August 2010
- Recorded: June – July 2010
- Genre: Alternative rock, jazz fusion, jam
- Length: 79:56
- Label: JEMP
- Producer: Phish
- Compiler: Kevin Shapiro

Live Bait chronology
Live Bait Vol. 01 - Summer 2010 Leg 1 (2010)	Live Bait Vol. 2 (2010)

Live Bait Vol. 01 - Summer 2010 Leg 1 is a live download by jam band Phish. This download features highlights from their summer tour, including Backwards Down the Number Line and Kill Devil Falls. The album was released shortly after Phish's 2010 Summer Tour was completed. It was available for free on the official Phish website for a short time. It is now available for purchase from Phish's LivePhish website.

== Track listing ==
No.	Title	Writer(s)	Recording date and venue	Length
1.	"Alumni Blues" → "Letter to Jimmy Page" → "Alumni Blues"	Trey Anastasio	June 25, 2010 – Susquehanna Bank Center (Camden, NJ)	5:47
2.	"Backwards Down the Number Line"	Anastasio; Tom Marshall	June 12, 2010 – Blossom Music Center (Cleveland, OH)	13:38
3.	"Swept Away" → "Steep"	Anastasio; Jon Fishman; Mike Gordon; Page McConnell; Marshall	June 20, 2010 – Saratoga Performing Arts Center (Saratoga Springs, NY)	5:23
4.	"Gumbo"	Anastasio; Fishman	July 3, 2010 – Verizon Wireless Amphitheatre at Encore Park (Alpharetta, GA)
5.	"My Sweet One"	Fishman	July 3, 2010 – Verizon Wireless Amphitheatre at Encore Park (Alpharetta, GA)	2:42
6.	"Kill Devil Falls"	Anastasio; Marshall	June 22, 2010 – Comcast Center (Mansfield, MA)	10:59
7.	"Tweezer"	Anastasio; Fishman; Gordon; McConnell	July 3, 2010 – Verizon Wireless Amphitheatre at Encore Park (Alpharetta, GA)	15:10
8.	"Slave to the Traffic Light"	Anastasio; Dave Abrahams; Steve Pollak	July 3, 2010 – Verizon Wireless Amphitheatre at Encore Park (Alpharetta, GA)	10:18
9.	"Show of Life"	Anastasio; Pollak	June 19, 2010 – Saratoga Performing Arts Center (Saratoga Springs, NY)	7:07
10.	"Tweezer Reprise"	Anastasio; Fishman; Gordon; McConnell	June 19, 2010 – Saratoga Performing Arts Center (Saratoga Springs, NY)	3:54
