= Birds of a Feather (Phish song) =

- Cover of promo single

Single by Phish

from the album The Story of the Ghost
- Released: 1998
- Recorded: March 11–15, September 29–October 2, 1997; April–June 1998, Bearsville Studios, Bearsville, New York and March 4–7, April 7–11, 1997, Dave O's Farmhouse
- Genre: Funk rock
- Length: 4:14
- Label: Elektra PRCD 1191-2
- Songwriters: Trey Anastasio, Jon Fishman, Mike Gordon, Tom Marshall, Page McConnell
- Producer: Andy Wallace

Phish singles chronology
"Character Zero" (1997)	"Birds of a Feather" (1998)	"Wading in the Velvet Sea" (1998)

"Birds of a Feather" is a 1998 song by the American band Phish. It is the second track from their 1998 album The Story of the Ghost and was released as their twelfth promotional single by Elektra Records. The song is a funk rock song written by the entire band and lyricist Tom Marshall, and was influenced by Talking Heads.

The song premiered on April 2, 1998 at the Nassau Coliseum in Uniondale, New York, the first of the four shows in the "Island Tour". This show is available as Live Phish 04.02.98. Musically, it was one of the more upbeat tracks from the predominantly slow and funky The Story of the Ghost album.

"Birds of a Feather" is one of the few Phish songs to be performed three times on U.S. national television. The song was first performed at the 1998 Farm Aid concert, on October 3, 1998, and shown live on CMT. It was also played at PBS's Sessions at West 54th on October 20, 1998 which was broadcast on PBS affiliates starting on January 9, 1999. The third performance was on the October 27, 1998 episode of CBS's Late Show with David Letterman.

The song also was featured on the October 7, 1998 episode of the WB teen drama Dawson's Creek, entitled "The Kiss".

"Birds of a Feather" was a Top 20 hit on Billboard's Adult Alternative Songs chart, reaching a peak of #14 in December 1998.

Additionally, the song was featured on the soundtrack of the video game MLB The Show 23.

== Track listing ==
1. "Birds of a Feather" (Trey Anastasio, Jon Fishman, Mike Gordon, Tom Marshall, Page McConnell) - 4:14

== Charts ==
Chart (1998)	Peak position
U.S. Adult Alternative Songs (Billboard)	14
U.S. Rock (Radio & Records)	45

== Personnel ==
Musicians

Trey Anastasio – guitars, vocals
Page McConnell – keyboards, vocals
Mike Gordon – bass guitar, vocals
Jon Fishman – drums, vocals

== Also appears on ==
- Live Phish Volume 6 (2001)
- Live Phish Volume 8 (2002)
- Live Phish Volume 16 (2002)
- Live Phish Volume 17 (2003)
- Live Phish 04.02.98 (2005)
- Live Phish 04.04.98 (2005)
- Live In Brooklyn (CD/DVD) (2006)
- Live in Utica (DVD) (2011)
- Ventura (2013)
