= Slip Stitch and Pass =

Live album by Phish
- Released: October 28, 1997
- Recorded: March 1, 1997
- Venue: Markthalle Hamburg (Germany)
- Genre: Jam rock; prog rock; jazz-rock; neo-psychedelia; funk rock
- Length: 72:46
- Label: Elektra
- Producer: Bryce Goggin

Phish chronology
Billy Breathes (1996)	Slip Stitch and Pass (1997)	The Story of the Ghost (1998)

Professional ratings
Review scores
Source	Rating
AllMusic	4.5/5 stars
The Encyclopedia of Popular Music	2/5 stars
Entertainment Weekly	B / B+
Rolling Stone	3/5 stars
Spin	5/10
Uncut	3/5 stars
The Village Voice	B+

Slip Stitch and Pass is the second official live album by the American rock band Phish. It was released on October 28, 1997, by Elektra Records and has nine tracks from the band's March 1, 1997, show at the Markthalle Hamburg in Hamburg, Germany, which was part of Phish's 1997 European Tour.

The album marked the first time that concert staples "Mike's Song" and "Weekapaug Groove" had appeared on an official Phish release, despite both having been part of the band's repertoire since the 1980s. Three of the album's nine songs are cover songs: "Cities" from Talking Heads, "Jesus Just Left Chicago" from ZZ Top and the traditional a cappella standard "Hello My Baby".

In addition, during the final jam segment of "Mike's Song", the band quotes (or 'teases') Pink Floyd's "Careful with That Axe, Eugene" and elements and lyrics from The Doors song "The End". Both "Lawn Boy" and "Weekapaug Groove" subsequently have lyrics from "The End". The close of "Weekapaug Groove" interpolates the end section of the Rolling Stones' "Can't You Hear Me Knocking".

The jam on "Wolfman's Brother" is indicative of the band's foray into funk music, which dominated the group's improvisation over the next several years. The song also includes a tease of the band's own instrumental tune "Dave's Energy Guide."

Renowned graphic artist Storm Thorgerson designed the album cover.

== Track listing ==
No.	Title	Writer(s)	Lead vocals	Length
1.	"Cities"	David Byrne	Trey Anastasio	5:18
2.	"Wolfman's Brother"	Anastasio; Jon Fishman; Mike Gordon; Page McConnell; Tom Marshall	Anastasio	13:50
3.	"Jesus Just Left Chicago"	Frank Beard, Billy Gibbons, Dusty Hill	McConnell	12:58
4.	"Weigh"	Gordon	Gordon	5:29
5.	"Mike's Song"	Gordon	Gordon	13:52
6.	"Lawn Boy"	Anastasio; Marshall	McConnell	2:56
7.	"Weekapaug Groove"	Anastasio; Fishman; Gordon; McConnell	Anastasio; Gordon; McConnell	8:20
8.	"Hello My Baby"	Joseph E. Howard; Ida Emerson; Louis C. Singer	Anastasio; Fishman; Gordon; McConnell	1:19
9.	"Taste"	Anastasio; Fishman; Gordon; McConnell; Marshall	Anastasio; Fishman	8:44
Total length:				72:46

== Set list ==
Full set list
Set 1	Cities → The Oh Kee Pa Ceremony, Down with Disease, Weigh, Beauty of My Dreams, Wolfman's Brother → Jesus Just Left Chicago, Reba, Hello My Baby, Possum
Set 2	Carini, Dinner and a Movie → Mike's Song → Lawn Boy → Weekapaug Groove, The Mango Song → Billy Breathes, Theme From the Bottom
Encore	Taste, Sweet Adeline
Notes	The week-long trend of breaking out songs continued with the show-opening Cities, which was the first since July 5, 1994 (222 shows). Wolfman's included a Dave's Energy Guide tease. Reba did not have the whistling ending. Possum included an All Fall Down signal and a heavy metal-style intro. The jam out of Mike's featured teases and vocal quotes of The End (The Doors), Peace Frog, and Careful with That Axe, Eugene; The End (The Doors) was subsequently quoted in Lawn Boy and Weekapaug. Weekapaug was unfinished and ended in a Can't You Hear Me Knocking jam.

== Personnel ==
Phish

Trey Anastasio – guitars, lead vocals, a cappella vocals on "Hello My Baby"
Page McConnell – keyboards, backing vocals, lead vocals on "Jesus Just Left Chicago" and "Lawn Boy", a cappella vocals on "Hello My Baby"
Mike Gordon – bass guitar, backing vocals, lead vocals on "Weigh" and "Mike's Song", a cappella vocals on "Hello My Baby"
Jon Fishman – drums, backing vocals, co-lead vocals on "Taste", a cappella vocals on "Hello My Baby"

== Charts ==
Chart performance for Slip Stitch and Pass
Chart (1997)	Peak position
US Billboard 200	17
