= Chalk Dust Torture =

- Cover of promo single

Single by Phish

from the album A Picture of Nectar
- Released: 1992
- Recorded: June–August 1991, White Crow Studios, Burlington, Vermont
- Genre: Rock
- Length: 4:35
- Label: Elektra PRCD 8511-2
- Songwriters: Trey Anastasio, Tom Marshall
- Producers: Phish, Kevin Halpin

Phish singles chronology
"Chalk Dust Torture" (1992)	"Cavern" (1992)

"Chalk Dust Torture" is a 1992 song by the American band Phish. It is the thirteenth track from their 1992 album A Picture of Nectar and was also released as their first promotional single by Elektra Records. The song is a riff-based, fast-paced rock song written by Phish guitarist and lead vocalist Trey Anastasio and lyricist Tom Marshall. The studio recording features a lowered pitch effect on Anastasio's lead vocal, and in order to accommodate the lower pitch (one half-step down), the song's typical key of E was dropped to Eb. "Chalk Dust Torture" was the band's first song to receive significant radio airplay, peaking at No. 53 on the Radio & Records Album-oriented rock chart in 1992.

== History ==
The main guitar riff for the song originated in the fall of 1990 on a track called "Self." Recorded in studio in August 1991 (and later released in 1994 on Crimes of the Mind), it featured a collaboration between Phish and their longtime friend, The Dude of Life (aka, Steve Pollak).

The song was re-worked and included in the recording sessions for A Picture of Nectar. In addition to the CD single, the track was also released as an unedited LP to radio stations.

Played at over a quarter of their live shows, band members have taken a particular liking to playing the song in a live setting. Since debuting in February 1991, drummer Jon Fishman claims that the song went from being among his "least favorite" in the Phish catalog, to one that he hopes to play well into his eighties. He sarcastically notes that the lyric "can I live while I'm young?" sounds ever "more desperate" the older the band gets.

In 1994, Phish performed the song on the Late Show with David Letterman, supposedly at the host's request.

As the song's lyricist, Marshall has said that it was among the last he wrote by hand before switching to a computer.

== Track listing ==
1. "Chalk Dust Torture" (Trey Anastasio, Tom Marshall) - 4:35

== Personnel ==
Phish

Trey Anastasio – guitars, vocals
Page McConnell – keyboards, backing vocals
Mike Gordon – bass guitar, backing vocals
Jon Fishman – drums

== Also appears on ==
- A Live One (1995)
- Live Phish Volume 2 (2001)
- Live Phish Volume 6 (2001)
- Live Phish Volume 7 (2002)
- Live Phish Volume 8 (2002)
- Live Phish Volume 16 (2002)
- Live Phish Volume 17 (2003)
- It (DVD) (2004)
- Live Phish 04.02.98 (2005)
- New Year's Eve 1995 (2005)
- At the Roxy (2008)
- The Clifford Ball (DVD) (2009)
- Hampton/Winston-Salem '97 (2011)
- Chicago '94 (2012)
- Ventura (2013)
- The Spectrum '97 (2024)
