= Nassau Coliseum =

Multi-purpose indoor arena in Uniondale, New York, U.S.

Nassau Veterans Memorial Coliseum
- The Barn; The Old Barn; The Coli; Fort Neverlose

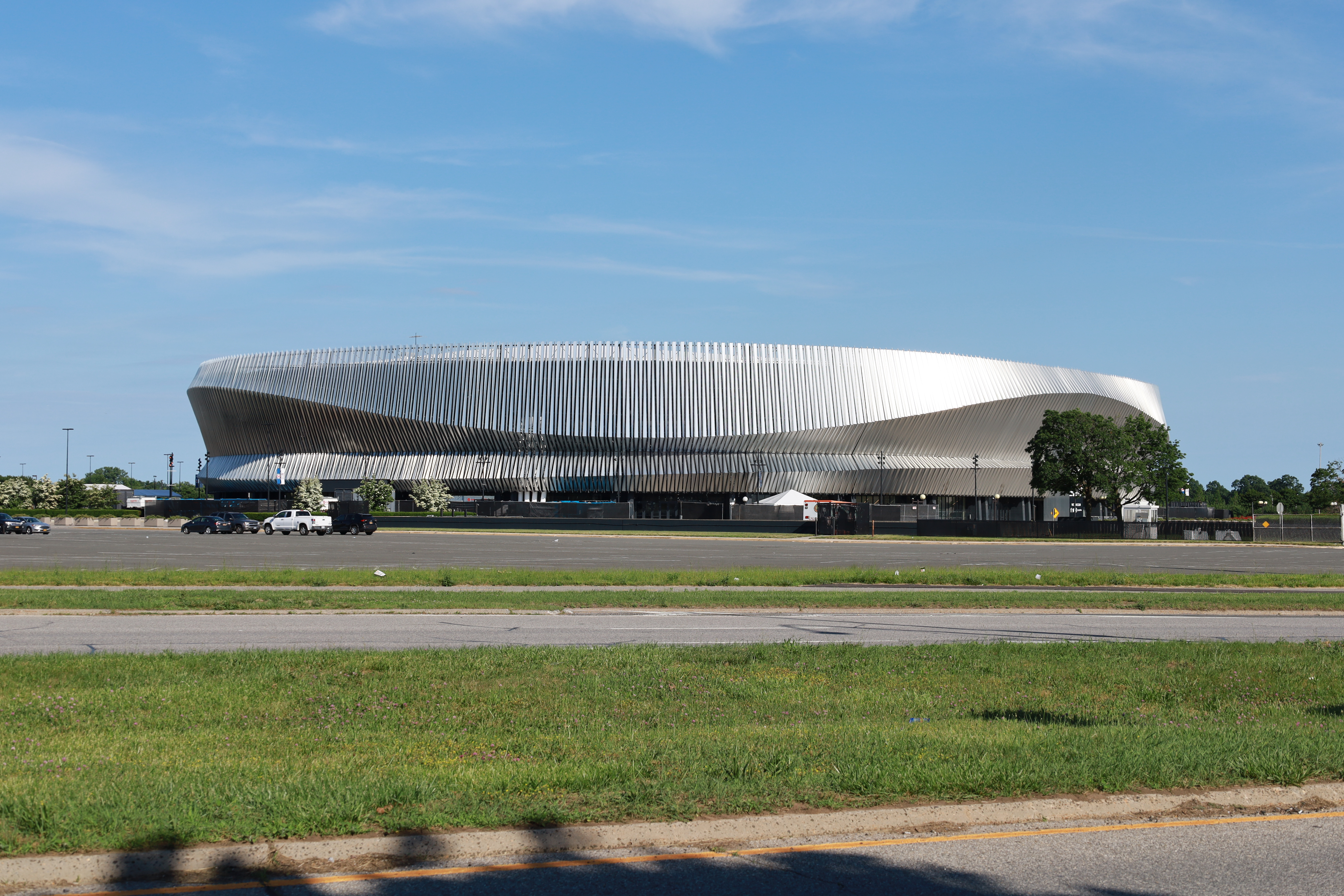
- The Nassau Coliseum in 2021

- Location in New York State Location in the United States
- Address: 1255 Hempstead Turnpike
- Location: Uniondale, New York, U.S.
- Coordinates: 40°43′22″N 73°35′26″W
- Owner: Nassau County, New York
- Operator: Nassau Live Center, LLC
- Capacity: Concerts: 16,000; Basketball: 14,500; Ice hockey: 13,900
- Executive suites: 32
- Surface: Multi-surface
- Scoreboard: Daktronics Inc.
- Public transit: Nassau Inter-County Express: N70, N71

Construction
- Groundbreaking: January 20, 1969
- Built: 1969–1972
- Opened: February 11, 1972
- Renovated: 2015–2017
- Expanded: 1976, 1983, 2017
- Reopened: March 31, 2017 (renovations)
- Cost: US$32 million ($281 million in 2025 dollars)
- Architect: Welton Becket and Associates
- Structural engineer: Severud Associates
- General contractor: Irwin Schlef

Tenants
- New York Islanders (NHL) (1972–2015, 2018–2021); New York Nets (ABA/NBA) (1972–1977); New York Sets/Apples (WTT) (1974–1977); Long Island Tomahawks (NLL) (1975); New York Arrows (MISL) (1978–1984); New York Express (MISL) (1986–1987); New York Saints (NLL) (1989–2003); Long Island Jawz (RHI) (1996); New York Dragons (AFL) (2001–2008); New York Titans (NLL) (2007); Long Island Nets (NBAGL) (2017–present); New York Riptide (NLL) (2020–2024)

Website
- nassaucoliseum.com

Nassau Veterans Memorial Coliseum (or simply the Nassau Coliseum) is a multi-purpose indoor arena in Uniondale, New York, on Long Island. The venue is situated approximately 7 miles (11 km) east of the eastern limits of the borough of Queens in New York City, adjacent to the Meadowbrook Parkway. It is one of the larger public auditoriums in the New York metropolitan area.

Opened in 1972, the Coliseum occupies 63 acres (25 ha) of Mitchel Field, a former Army airfield, later an Air Force base. The facility is located in the Town of Hempstead, within the Uniondale 11553 ZIP Code. The Coliseum is used for sporting events, concerts, large exhibitions, as well as trade shows—44,000 square feet (4,100 m^{2}) at the main arena, 60,000 square feet (5,600 m^{2}) at the Expo Center. In 2015, the arena was closed for a major renovation which was completed in April 2017.

The New York Islanders of the National Hockey League (NHL) played at the Coliseum from 1972 to 2015 before moving to Barclays Center in Brooklyn. After the move was commercially unsuccessful, the team split its home schedule between Barclays and the renovated Coliseum from 2018 to 2020 and played the home portion of their 2020–21 season at the Coliseum, before moving to the new UBS Arena at Belmont Park for the 2021–22 season, which is also on Hempstead Turnpike, 7.7 miles (12.4 km) west of the Coliseum.

It was also the home of the New York Nets (now known as the Brooklyn Nets) of the American Basketball Association (ABA) and National Basketball Association (NBA) from 1972 to 1977 and the New York Riptide of the National Lacrosse League (NLL) from 2020 to 2024. In 2017, the venue became the new home of the Brooklyn Nets' NBA G League team, the Long Island Nets. Currently, the Nets serve as the building's main tenant.

== Sports ==
The Coliseum originally had a capacity of 13,000 to 15,000 depending on the event, and in the early 1980s the maximum capacity was increased to around 18,000. Before closing for renovations in 2015 the Coliseum seated 16,170 for hockey, up to 18,511 for concerts and 17,686 for boxing. Those renovations resulted in drastically reduced capacities: 13,917 for hockey and 14,500 for basketball.

=== Hockey ===
The New York Raiders, intended by the fledgling World Hockey Association to be their flagship franchise, were slated to play in the new Nassau Coliseum in 1972–73. However, the Nassau County government did not consider the WHA a fully professional league and wanted nothing to do with the Raiders.

Nassau County retained William Shea to get an NHL team to play in the new building. The NHL responded by hastily awarding a franchise to Long Island—the New York Islanders—which forced the Raiders to play in Madison Square Garden, in the shadow of the New York Rangers. On October 7, 1972, the first Islanders game in Nassau Coliseum was played as the Atlanta Flames visited the Islanders. Flames forward Morris Stefaniw scored the first NHL goal in the building at 6:56 of the first period, while Ed Westfall scored the first goal for the Islanders, as the Flames won the game 3–2. The first Islanders' home win at the arena was on October 12, 1972, where they defeated the Los Angeles Kings 3–2. The Islanders' first playoff win at the arena came on April 20, 1975, where they defeated the Pittsburgh Penguins 4–2. On April 22, 1976, the Islanders earned their first playoff series victory at the arena by defeating the Buffalo Sabres 3–2, and winning the series 4–2.

On February 8, 1983, the arena hosted the 35th National Hockey League All-Star Game, during which Wayne Gretzky scored four goals in the third period and was honored as the game's most valuable player.

The Islanders were 11–1 in Stanley Cup Final games at the Coliseum. Their only loss was a 1–0 setback in Game 1 in 1984 to the Edmonton Oilers. Team's fans nicknamed the arena "Fort Neverlose" in honor of the team's strong home record during the finals.

Nassau Coliseum hosted minor league hockey prior to the awarding of the Islanders franchise, an event that was brought back in 2005, when the Islanders-affiliated Bridgeport Sound Tigers of the American Hockey League (AHL) played two "home" games at the Coliseum in the absence of NHL hockey due to the 2004–05 NHL lockout. On April 17–18, 2009, the Sound Tigers played two of their home playoff games against the Wilkes-Barre/Scranton Penguins at the Coliseum due to a scheduling conflict at the Arena at Harbor Yard in Bridgeport, Connecticut, the team's home.

The Islanders played their last game at the Coliseum before moving to Barclays Center on April 25, 2015, beating the Washington Capitals 3–1 in Game 6 of the first round of the 2015 playoffs against the Washington Capitals forcing a Game 7, held in and won by Washington, ending the Islanders' first run at the Coliseum; in Game 6 Cal Clutterbuck of the Islanders scored the final NHL goal in the building, an empty netter at 19:07 of the third period. Following the 2014–15 season, the Coliseum underwent a major renovation. On September 17, 2017, the Islanders returned to the Nassau Coliseum to face the Philadelphia Flyers for a preseason match up. With the Islanders being unhappy at their home in Brooklyn, the league awarded the Islanders to split their home games during the 2018–19 season between the Barclays Center and Nassau Coliseum. The Islanders played their first regular season game back at the Coliseum on December 1, 2018, against the Columbus Blue Jackets, where the Islanders won 3–2. During the 2019 playoffs, the First Round was held at the Coliseum. The Islanders again split the 2019–20 season between Nassau Coliseum and Barclays Center and it was announced by then New York Governor Andrew Cuomo that the Islanders would play the remainder of their games at the Coliseum, while the Islanders new home UBS Arena was being built and the 2020–21 season being the final at the Coliseum. With the COVID-19 pandemic, the Islanders played at Scotiabank Arena and Rogers Place during the 2020 playoffs, and then opened up the 2020–21 season at the Coliseum with no fans.

The Islanders played their final game at the Coliseum before moving to their new arena on June 23, 2021, beating the Tampa Bay Lightning in a 3–2 overtime win in game 6 of the 2021 Stanley Cup semifinals, with Anthony Beauvillier scoring the overtime goal to force game 7. However, the Islanders lost game 7, thus making game 6 the last major league sporting event held there, and Beauvillier scored the last NHL goal in this arena, and his team achieved a rare feat as a consolation prize: they became the third team (after the 1982–83 Calgary Flames and 1994–95 Quebec Nordiques) to end their arena's history with a playoff victory.

=== Basketball ===
The Coliseum was home to the New York Nets of the American Basketball Association, and later the National Basketball Association, from 1972 to 1977. The first event at the Coliseum was a Nets game against the Pittsburgh Condors on February 11, 1972.

The Nets won two ABA Championships in the Coliseum, with Hall of Famer Julius Erving headlining the team. In 1973–74 the Nets defeated the Utah Stars in five games to capture their first title. The Nets then captured the final American Basketball Association Championship in 1976, defeating the Denver Nuggets in six games. Following the 1976 season the Nets joined the National Basketball Association as part of the ABA–NBA merger. After their first season in the NBA, the Nets moved to New Jersey. The New Jersey Nets played four seasons at the Rutgers Athletic Center before completion of the Meadowlands Arena at the Meadowlands Sports Complex.

In NCAA Division I men's college basketball, the Coliseum hosted the ECAC Metro Region tournament organized by the Eastern College Athletic Conference (ECAC) in 1978, 1979, 1980, and 1981. It also has hosted first- and second-round games of the NCAA Division I men's basketball tournament in 1982, 1994, and 2001.

On November 5, 2015, the Nets announced that their new NBA D-League team, the Long Island Nets, would play at the renovated Coliseum starting in 2017 (the team played their first season at their parent team's home, the Barclays Center).

=== Other sports ===
The Coliseum also hosted the New York Arrows and later the New York Express of the original Major Indoor Soccer League. The Arrows, which existed as a franchise from 1978 to 1984, won the first four MISL championships. The short-lived New York Express played part of the 1986–87 season, ending operations before the All-Star break with financial troubles and a 3–23 record.

The New York Sets of World Team Tennis played their first match at Nassau Coliseum on May 7, 1974, and won the WTT championships in 1976. The team changed its name to the New York Apples for the 1977 season, and played 12 of its 22 home matches at Madison Square Garden and the Felt Forum, repeating as champions. Prior to the 1978 season, the Apples announced that they would leave the Coliseum and play all their home matches in the Madison Square Garden complex.

The Coliseum was home to the New York Saints of the National Lacrosse League from 1989 to 2003. In 2007, it was home to four of the New York Titans National Lacrosse League team's eight home games (along with Madison Square Garden).

In 2000, 2005 and 2017, the Professional Bull Riders brought their Built Ford Tough Series (originally Bud Light Cup) to the Coliseum.

On February 24–25, 2006, the Coliseum hosted the 44th NYSPHSAA Wrestling Championships. It was just the third time the annual event has been held on Long Island. Selling 17,755 tickets over three sessions, it broke (and still holds) the NYSPHSAA wrestling tournament attendance record.

On July 19–20, 2014, the Global RallyCross Championship raced at the Nassau Coliseum parking lot.

On July 22, 2017, the Coliseum hosted UFC on Fox: Weidman vs. Gastelum.

In February 2018, the Coliseum hosted the New York Open, an ATP 250 men's tennis tournament replacing the long-running Memphis Open.

In 2019, the Coliseum became the home of the National Lacrosse League's New York Riptide. In 2024 the team would relocate to Ottawa.

=== Seating capacity ===
The seating capacity for hockey during the life of the arena has been:

- 13,571 (1972–1973)
- 14,665 (1972–1973)
- 14,865 (1973–1976)
- 15,317 (1976–1978)
- 14,995 (1978–1980)
- 15,008 (1980–1981)
- 15,230 (1982–1983)
- 15,850 (1983–1984)
- 16,002 (1984–1986)
- 16,270 (1986–1987)
- 16,297 (1987–2001)
- 16,234 (2001–2009)
- 16,250 (2009–2012)
- 16,170 (2012–2015)
- 13,917 (2017–present)

== Entertainment ==
=== Concerts ===
Elvis Presley performed four sold-out concerts at the Nassau Coliseum on June 22, 23 & 24, 1973. His last two Coliseum appearances were on July 19, 1975. In 1977, Elvis had been scheduled for an August 22 concert as part of his sixth tour of the year, but he died on August 16, the day before the tour was to start. Tickets for the show have become collector's items.

The Beach Boys performed to a sold-out audience on June 14, 1974. Their tour promoted the recently released Holland album and featured a set list of recent songs as well as several of their early 1960s hits. They were joined onstage by Elton John and Paul Simon for the encore performance. Several of the songs included on The Beach Boys In Concert album were recorded at The Nassau Coliseum.

Joni Mitchell performed at the Coliseum the night of August 28, 1974.

David Bowie performed a radio broadcast from there during his 1976 Isolar Tour, in support of the album Station to Station. A heavily circulated bootleg of the concert saw official release in 2010 as part of the 2010 reissue of the album, and in 2017 as a separate release, Live Nassau Coliseum '76. Queen played at the Coliseum on February 6, 1977, during their A Day at the Races Tour. The band used footage of their performance of "Tie Your Mother Down" in the song's promotional film. They would return on November 19, 1978, on their Jazz Tour.

Blue Öyster Cult recorded a live version of "Dr. Music" in Nassau Coliseum on December 30, 1981, that was subsequently released on the Extraterrestrial Live album in April 1982.

The Coliseum was one of only two venues in the United States where Pink Floyd mounted their limited run of shows for The Wall Tour. The group performed five concerts from February 24 through 28, 1980 one of which was filmed and only appeared as an underground tape. Between August 19 and 23, 1988, on their A Momentary Lapse of Reason Tour, they recorded and filmed the majority of the subsequent live album Delicate Sound of Thunder.

Live on Long Island 04–18–80 by The Marshall Tucker Band was the original lineup's final concert and the final recording of bassist and founding member Tommy Caldwell, who died just ten days later in an automobile accident. Tommy Caldwell is pictured on the album cover. The Coliseum album was the first to feature a complete concert from the original band. However, the album wasn't released until 26 years later. The band was touring in support of their album Tenth at the time, and the recording features the songs "It Takes Time" and "Cattle Drive" from that release as well as classics such as "Heard It in a Love Song", "Searchin' for a Rainbow" and "Can't You See".

Billy Joel's concert from his 1982 tour at the Coliseum was recorded for a 1983 HBO concert special and VHS/Laser Disc release, Billy Joel: Live From Long Island.

Bruce Springsteen has performed at the arena numerous times, most notably during a three-night stand in December 1980. A number of songs from these shows were part of his 1986 live album, Live/1975–85, and full recordings of the three performances were released between 2015 and 2021. The New Year's Eve show in particular is often regarded by fans as one of the greatest gigs of Springsteen's career.

The 1987 home video Cliff 'Em All features a rendition of the song "Master of Puppets" by Metallica, filmed at Nassau Coliseum on April 28, 1986 (while the band was opening a show for Ozzy Osbourne).

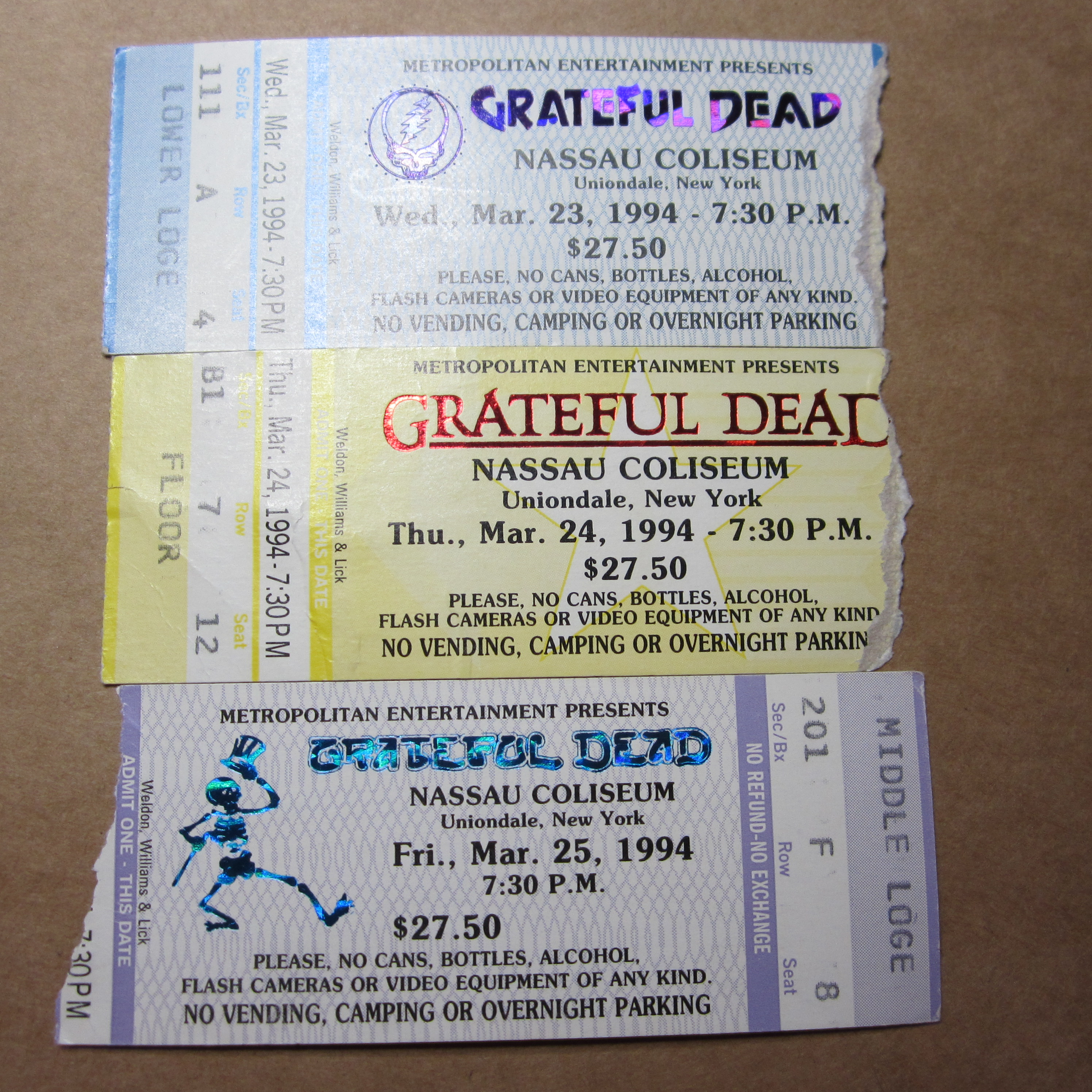
Mail-ordered Grateful Dead concert tickets for their spring 1994 Nassau Coliseum run

Both the Grateful Dead and Phish frequently played the Coliseum, concerts yielding live albums in both cases: Go to Nassau, Wake Up to Find Out, Dick's Picks Volume 13, Spring 1990: So Glad You Made It, Spring 1990 (album), Spring 1990 (The Other One) by the Dead; and five installments of the Live Phish Series—4–2–98, 4–3–98, 4–4–98, 4–5–98 and 2-28-03. The Grateful Dead holds the record for the most performances at the venue by a single act with 42 total shows. A banner was raised during a 2019 Dead & Company show commemorating the 44 combined performances by the Grateful Dead and Dead & Company.

Genesis' performance at the Coliseum on November 29, 1981 (during the band's Abacab Tour) was recorded and filmed for the band's Three Sides Live album and concert video plus radio broadcast.

Frank Zappa played his final U.S. show on March 25, 1988 at the Coliseum. He was joined onstage by his son, Dweezil Zappa, for the concert's encores.

In March 1990, the country supergroup The Highwaymen performed at the Coliseum. Their performance was recorded and was released on VHS in 1991.

On June 17, 1991, Guns N' Roses played a sold-out show at Nassau Coliseum as part of their Use Your Illusion Tour. Skid Row (American Band) opened, and the show came 3 months before Use Your Illusion I and II were released in September 1991.

=== Professional wrestling ===
Nassau has been a mainstay of WWE for over 40 years, and has hosted Raw and SmackDown many times, including the taping of a SmackDown episode where professional wrestler Droz suffered a (untelevised) career-ending injury in 1999.

On May 10, 1985, the Coliseum hosted the taping of the series premiere of Saturday Night's Main Event, a recurring series of WWF specials broadcast by NBC during the peak of the 1980s professional wrestling boom. On December 14, 2024, Saturday Night's Main Event returned to the Coliseum for the premiere of its second revival as an NBC prime time special.

The Coliseum hosted the opening leg of WrestleMania 2 on April 7, 1986. As part of an ambitious plan to host WrestleMania from three separate venues (alongside the Rosemont Horizon in Chicago and the Los Angeles Memorial Sports Arena), 16,585 fans saw 4 live matches at the Coliseum with the rest of the event shown to the audience by closed-circuit television. The main event at the Nassau leg was a boxing match between "Rowdy" Roddy Piper and tough-guy actor Mr. T.

On August 25, 2002, SummerSlam was hosted at the Coliseum. Later, the WWE held The Great American Bash in 2008, followed by 2010's Fatal 4-Way, at the Coliseum. On April 10, 2017, the renovated Coliseum hosted its first episode of Raw. In October 2018, the Coliseum hosted Evolution, the promotion's first all-women's pay-per-view event.

The Coliseum hosted its first All Elite Wrestling pay-per-view, Worlds End on December 30, 2023.

The Nassau Coliseum also hosted several editions of now-defunct World Championship Wrestling's Monday Nitro.

=== In film ===
Scenes for the 2007 movie Music and Lyrics starring Hugh Grant and Drew Barrymore were filmed at the arena.

== Renovations ==
Not long after the Islanders announced their move to Brooklyn, Forest City Enterprises, the owner of Barclays Center, was chosen to perform a study on development possibilities for the Nassau Coliseum site. A request for proposal was issued as a result of this study to transform the arena into a smaller sized venue and its surrounding parking lot into an entertainment hub with theaters, sports bars, and retail.

Four competing proposals were submitted in May 2013, and Nassau County Executive Edward Mangano selected two finalists in July 2013, including one from a group led by Forest City Ratner. Ratner's proposal called for a reduction of the Coliseum's capacity to 13,000 seats and a revamp of the arena's interior and concrete facade designed by SHoP Architects, the firm which designed the Barclays Center, which would cost the group approximately $89 million. As part of his bid, the Islanders would play 6 games per season in the arena, the Brooklyn Nets would play one exhibition game, and a minor league hockey team would call the arena home.

On August 15, 2013, Nassau County announced Forest City had won the bid for the renovation of the Nassau Coliseum and the surrounding property, pending approval from the Nassau legislature and zoning changes from the Hempstead town government. The Nassau County Legislature unanimously approved the bid on September 24, 2013.

Billy Joel performed the arena's final pre-renovation concert on August 4, 2015.

On April 5, 2017, a Billy Joel concert was the arena's first post-renovation event. Other acts that performed during the new Coliseum's opening week include Stevie Nicks, The Pretenders, Idina Menzel, Lionel Richie, Mariah Carey, and Marc Anthony.

On November 4, 2016, Brooklyn Sports & Entertainment reached a naming rights deal with New York Community Bank. The cost of the naming rights and the agreement's length were not disclosed. The deal with the county mandated the inclusion of "Nassau Veterans Memorial Coliseum" in the arena's name; the naming rights were initially announced as having named the venue "Nassau Veterans Memorial Coliseum presented by New York Community Bank", but this was later revised to NYCB Live: Home of the Nassau Veterans Memorial Coliseum.

Ringling Bros. and Barnum & Bailey Circus performed their final show before at Nassau Coliseum on May 21, 2017. This was their only show at Nassau Coliseum post-renovation. Since the circus's animal-free return in 2023, they have only performed at other New York City area venues.

=== Planning/development of UBS Center, Islanders’ temporary return to Nassau ===
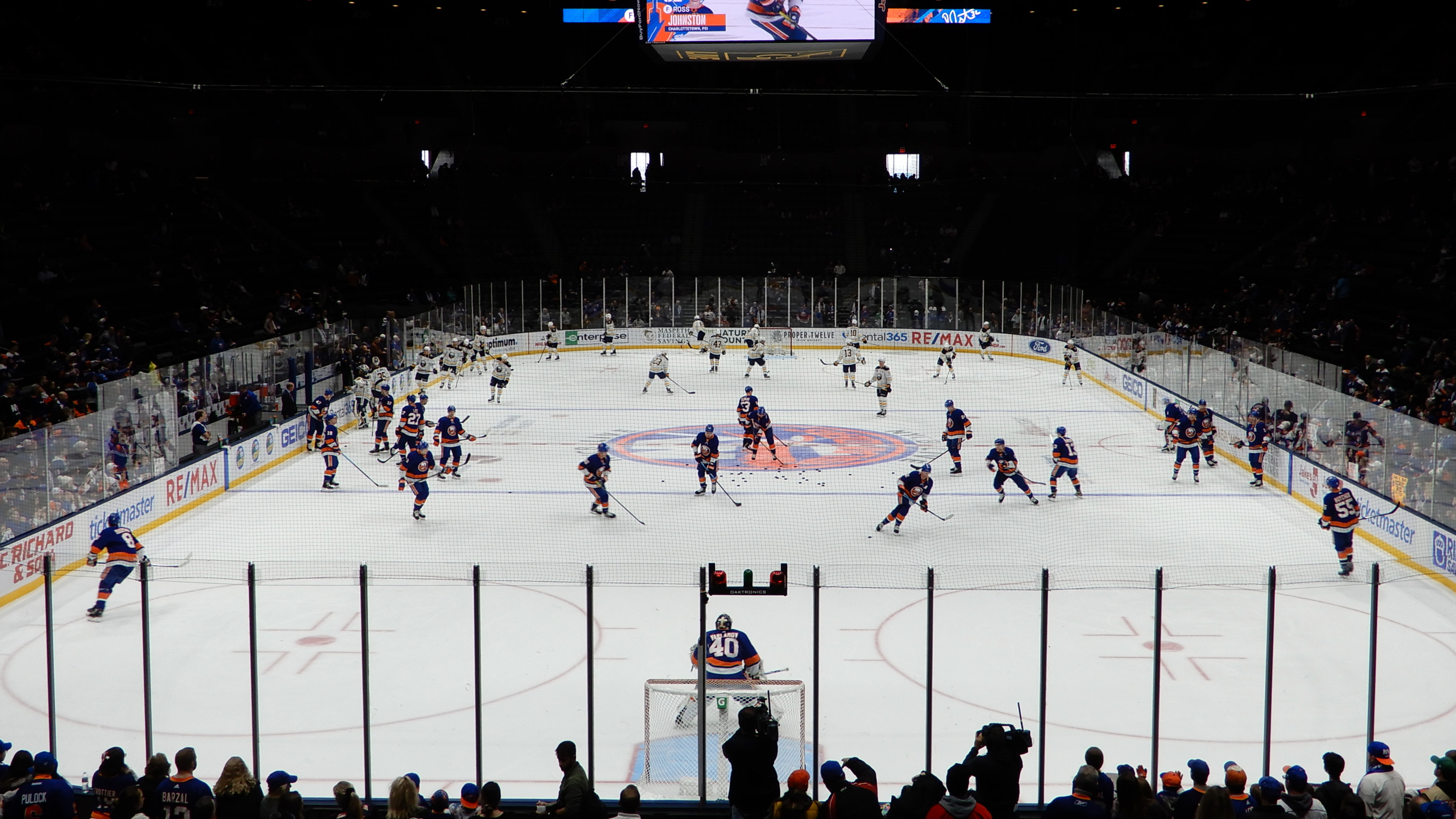
Islanders warmups prior to a 2019 game at the renovated Coliseum.

In late January 2017, Bloomberg News reported via internal sources that Barclays Center was considering dropping the Islanders due to poor attendance and their effects on the venue's profits, though fans and broadcasters decried the poor sight lines and ice conditions of Barclays' hockey configuration, including a Honda vehicle displayed at one end of the arena behind the boards which was impossible to configure to seat hockey fans and converted into an advertising opportunity instead. Newsday reported that Nassau County executive Edward Mangano had met with Islanders co-owner Jonathan Ledecky, and he told the paper the Islanders could return to the renovated Nassau Coliseum. These reports were further elaborated by Long Island Association president Kevin Law in April 2017, who stated that Brooklyn Sports & Entertainment (who manages both venues) was preparing to offer a relocation plan to the team. Law felt that the alternate option of seeking a new arena in Belmont Park was redundant to the renovated Coliseum. The Islanders played a preseason game against the Philadelphia Flyers on September 17, 2017, their first appearance at the renovated Coliseum.

The renovation project reduced the capacity of the arena to 13,900, a level which was believed to be unsustainable for an NHL team; in comparison, the Islanders' average attendance at Barclays was 12,059, the lowest in the NHL (Barclays Center was the second-smallest arena in the NHL based on seating capacity at 15,795, which was around 400 seats fewer than the Coliseum pre-renovation). As such, NHL commissioner Gary Bettman felt that returning was not a "viable option" for the Islanders, but noted that the team was "in the process of evaluating what makes the most sense for the franchise and particularly for their fans."

In December 2017, New York Arena Partners (a venture of the Islanders, Oak View Group, and Sterling Equities) won a bid to construct a new, 18,000-seat arena and mixed-use district at Belmont Park, beating a competing proposal by New York City FC for a new soccer stadium. The new arena opened for the 2021–22 season.

In January 2018, Islanders owner Jon Ledecky revealed on WFAN's Boomer and Gio that he had toured the renovated Coliseum with Bettman and other senior NHL officials. They assessed that the Islanders could play a limited schedule of home games at the Coliseum, but that it would not be sustainable as a full-time venue because of its capacity and diminished amenities (such as few corporate suites) over other newly built arenas. On January 23, 2018, it was reported that Barclays Center was pushing for a short-term lease under which the Islanders would split their home games between Barclays Center and Nassau Coliseum until the Belmont Park arena is completed, with the number of games at the Coliseum steadily increasing for each year of the arrangement.

On June 21, 2018, it was announced that the Islanders would play a portion of their home schedule at the Coliseum until the completion of the new arena, with 12 games moved in the 2018–19 season. The number of games during the 2018–19 season at the Coliseum was later increased to 20.

The Islanders used the Coliseum as their home rink during the first round of the 2019 Stanley Cup playoffs but moved back to the Barclays Center for the rest of the 2019 playoffs.

In September 2019, it was announced that in the 2019–20 season, the Islanders would play 28 of their 41 home games at the Coliseum. On February 29, 2020, state governor Andrew Cuomo announced that the Islanders would play any home playoff games of the 2020 playoffs and all 2020–21 season home games at the Coliseum. Due to the COVID-19 pandemic, the NHL season was suspended and continued in a bio-secure bubble later in the year, with the Islanders playing most of their playoff games at Scotiabank Arena in Toronto before traveling to Rogers Place in Edmonton for the Eastern Conference finals (their first conference finals appearance since 1993).

The Islanders played their final game at the renovated Coliseum on June 23, 2021, defeating the Tampa Bay Lightning 3–2 in overtime of Game 6 of the Stanley Cup semifinals. Anthony Beauvillier scored the final goal of the Islanders' second stint at the Coliseum. However, the Lightning would win Game 7 in Tampa to end the Islanders' season.

=== New leaseholders ===
In June 2020, Mikhail Prokhorov, whose company ran the Nassau Coliseum, announced that the arena would be closed indefinitely while it sought new investors to take it over and assume the remaining debt as a result of the COVID-19 pandemic. NYCB pulled out of its naming rights contract in late August 2020.

In August 2020, Nassau Coliseum's lease was taken over by Nassau Live Center, LLC, which is headed by a Florida-based businessman Nick Mastroianni II, whose company was responsible for the loan to help with the renovation of the arena. The new leaseholder agreed to let the Islanders play their home games in the arena until the UBS Arena was finished.

== Redevelopment proposals ==
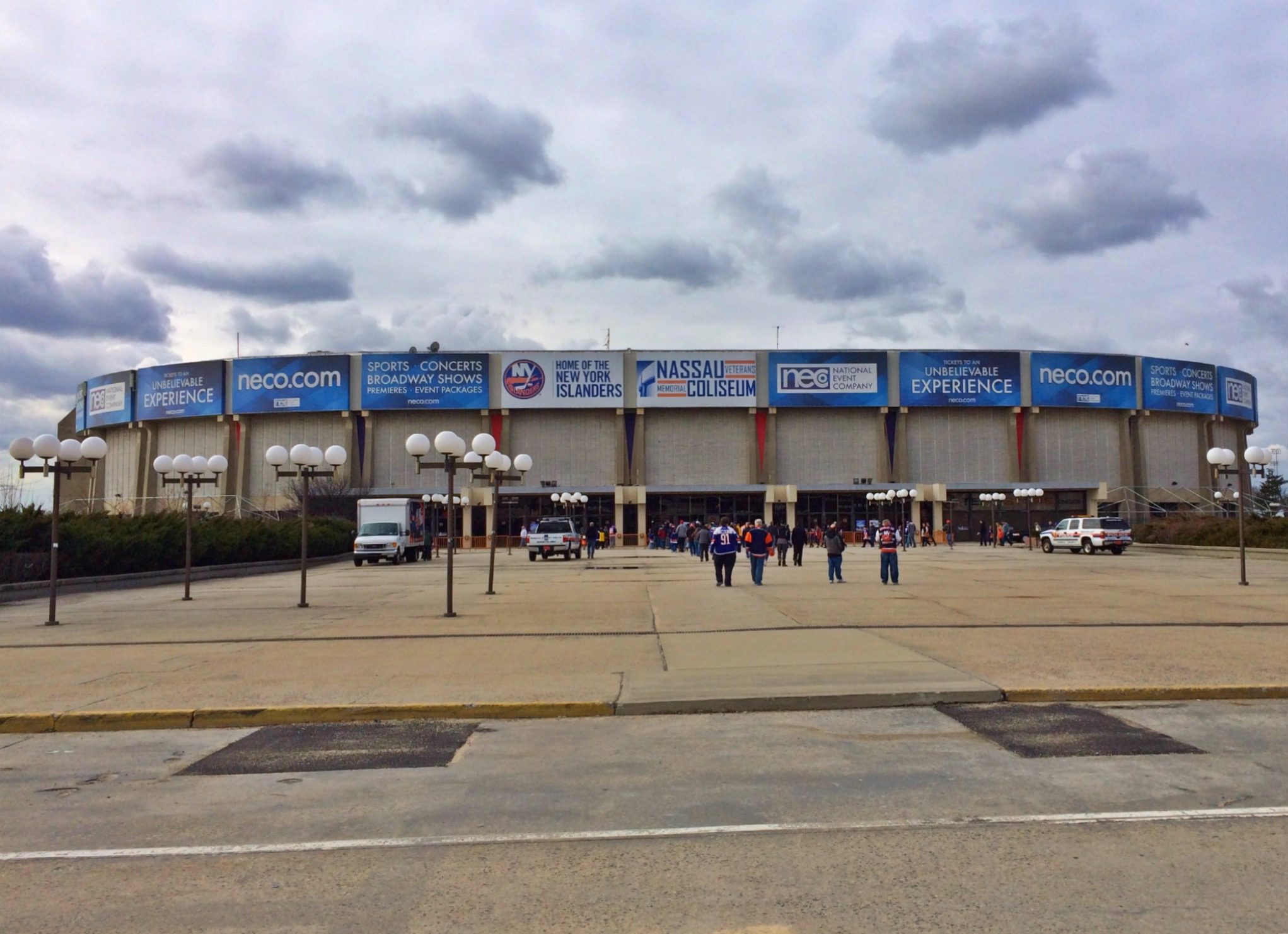
The original appearance of Nassau Coliseum, photographed in 2015

The Coliseum was the second-oldest arena in active use by a National Hockey League team (after nearby Madison Square Garden), and until the return of the Winnipeg Jets to the league at the 15,004-seat Canada Life Centre in Winnipeg, was the smallest arena in the NHL by total seating capacity. The arena had been considered obsolete for many years, and various Islanders owners tried to replace it.

=== The Lighthouse Project ===
Team and county officials announced in 2004 a plan called The Lighthouse Project to renovate the Coliseum. The project's centerpiece was a 60-story tower that would look like a lighthouse. Other plans included new housing, athletic facilities, a minor league baseball stadium, restaurants, and a hotel. The project would also add trees, water and other natural elements to the area.

On August 14, 2007, Islanders owner Charles Wang and the Lighthouse Development Group partnered with Rexcorp to create a new plan. The 60-story "lighthouse" evolved into two 31-story buildings connected by a footbridge at the top. The project was transformed from a simple renovation of the Coliseum property into a 150-acre (0.61 km^{2}) transformation of surrounding properties. Plans called for more 2,000 residential units (20% affordable housing), a hotel, a convention center, a sports technology center, 500,000 square feet (46,000 m^{2}) of retail space, and a sports complex next to the renovated Coliseum. The overall project was slated to cost roughly $3.75 billion.

Construction was not planned to begin until at least mid-2009. Nassau County approved the Lighthouse Project in 2006 on a 16–2 vote, and the Draft Environmental Impact Statement was completed after a state-mandated environmental review. The Lighthouse Project was then expected to go before the Town of Hempstead for approval on a change in land zoning. However, the approval was never granted. After the October 2009 deadline passed, the Long Island Press reported the Lighthouse Project's cancellation. Wang has denied the report.

In May 2010, Mets COO Jeff Wilpon had discussions with Wang about constructing an arena for the Islanders near Citi Field. Wilpon has also discussed buying the Islanders. In June 2010, the FanHouse website reported Jeff and Fred Wilpon, the owner of the Mets, began working with real estate firm Jones Lang LaSalle (who also worked on Madison Square Garden's latest renovation) on a feasibility study of a new Islanders arena in Queens. However, a source from Newsday indicated the FanHouse report was not true. There were also reports businessman Nelson Peltz wanted to buy the Islanders and move them to the Barclays Center in Brooklyn.

=== 2011 proposal to replace arena ===
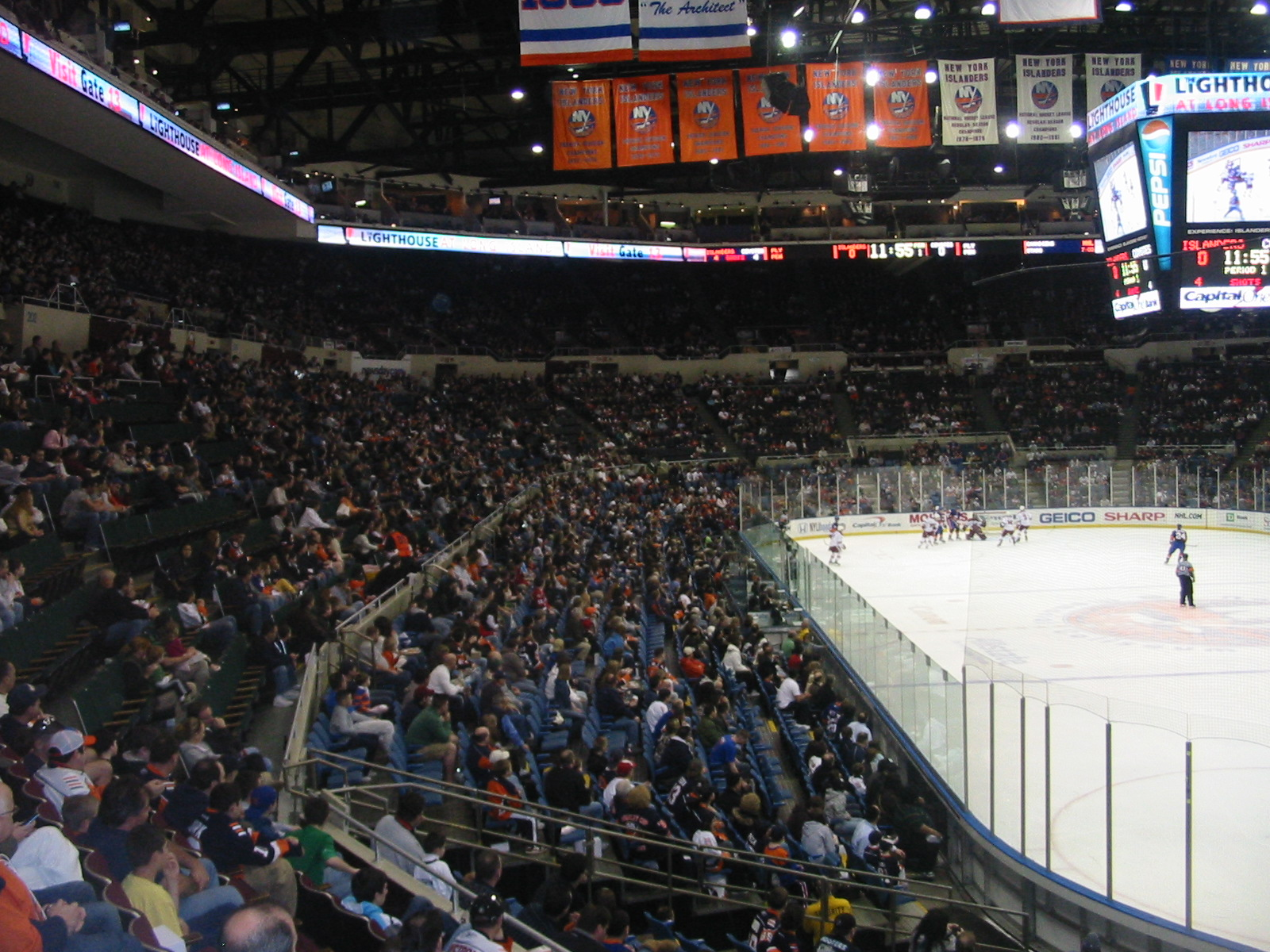
View of the Coliseum's seating during an Islanders game in 2009

On July 12, 2010, Town Supervisor Kate Murray (R-Hempstead) announced an "alternate zone" for the Nassau Veterans Memorial Coliseum property that downsized the Lighthouse Project to half its proposed size and made the project, according to Nassau County Executive Edward Mangano and the developers, "economically unviable for both the developer and owner of the site." As a result, Wang, Mangano and the developers decided they would no longer pursue the project.

On May 11, 2011, the Islanders and Nassau County executives announced that county residents would vote on a referendum for approval of a $400 million public bond issue for a new plan to replace the Coliseum. The plan, including the construction of a new $350 million arena as well as a $50 million minor league baseball ballpark nearby, was presented by Wang as a last-ditch effort to keep the Islanders on Long Island. However, voters in Nassau County rejected a proposal by a 57% to 43% margin on August 1, 2011.

On October 24, 2012, the Islanders announced the team would move to the Barclays Center in Brooklyn after their lease expired at the end of the 2014–2015 season. The Islanders played their final game at the Coliseum on April 25, 2015, beating the Washington Capitals 3–1 in Game 6 of the first round of the playoffs against the Washington Capitals forcing a Game 7, held in and won by Washington, ending the Islanders' run at the Coliseum; in Game 6 Cal Clutterbuck of the Islanders scored the final NHL goal in the building, an empty netter at 19:07 of the third period.

=== Sands New York proposal ===
Sands New York
- Interactive map of Sands New York
- Location: Uniondale, New York, United States
- Opened: Canceled
- No. of rooms: 1,670
- Gaming space: 400,000 sq ft
- Casino type: Resort
- Operating license holder: Las Vegas Sands

In 2023, Las Vegas Sands submitted a bid to lease the property of the Nassau Coliseum and construct an integrated resort, consisting of a casino, 1,670 hotel rooms and convention space, retail, dining and outdoor community spaces, possibly including demolition of the Coliseum. Following the announcement, parts of the local community surrounding the Coliseum had spoken out against it, citing a potential increase of traffic and congestion in the area. The Nassau County Legislature voted 17–1 with one recusal to transfer the Coliseum lease to the Sands, but in November a state judge struck down the deal, citing the County did not adequately provide enough transparent, public hearings for the project. In May 2024, the county announced it planned to resubmit the lease-transfer application. Las Vegas Sands withdrew their bid in April 2025. The company cited New York's move to legalize online gambling as their reason to withdraw the bid. Following the withdrawal of the bid, Sands was in talks with a third party to take over the Nassau Coliseum lease and the redevelopment of the site. After Sands exited, the community continued to push for the casino proposal to be dropped. By the end of May 2025, Sands was struggling to find another gaming company to take over the bid, making it possible that a new developer takes over and takes on a non-gaming project for the site.

Preceded by None shared with Barclays Center	Home of the New York Islanders; 1972–2015; 2018–2021 (the Islanders split their home games with Barclays Center from 2018 to 2020)	Succeeded by Barclays Center; UBS Arena
Preceded by Island Garden	Home of the New York Nets; 1971–1977	Succeeded by Rutgers Athletic Center
Preceded by Capital Centre	Host of NHL All-Star Game; 1983	Succeeded by Brendan Byrne Arena
Preceded by Madison Square Garden	Host of WrestleMania; 1986 (shared venues with Rosemont Horizon & Los Angeles Memorial Sports Arena)	Succeeded by Pontiac Silverdome
