= Live Bait Vol.02 - Summer 2010 Leg 2 =

Live Bait Vol. 02 - Summer 2010 Leg 2

Live album by Phish
- Released: October 2010
- Recorded: August 7 – 17, 2010
- Genres: Alternative rock, jazz fusion, jam
- Label: JEMP
- Producer: Phish
- Compiler: Kevin Shapiro

Live Bait chronology
Live Bait Vol.01 - Summer 2010 Leg 1 (2010)	Live Bait Vol. 02 - Summer 2010 Leg 2 (2010)	Live Bait Vol. 03 - Worcester Sampler (2010)

Live Bait, Vol. 02 - Summer 2010 Leg 2 is a live download by band Phish. This download features highlights from the second half of their 2010 summer tour, including the songs "Twenty Years Later" and "Light" from Phish's 2009 album, Joy. It was available for free on the official Phish website for a short time. It was made available for purchase on Phish's LivePhish website.

== Track listing ==
1. "Wilson" (Anastasio, Marshall, Woolfe) - 4:27 (2010-08-07 Greek Theatre, University of California Berkeley - Berkeley, CA)
2. "Light" (Anastasio, Marshall) - 17:14 (2010-08-07 Greek Theatre, University of California Berkeley - Berkeley, CA)
3. "Twenty Years Later" (Anastasio, Marshall) - 7:17 (2010-08-07 Greek Theatre, University of California Berkeley - Berkeley, CA)
4. "Down With Disease" (Anastasio, Marshall) - 16:54 (2010-08-14 Alpine Valley Music Theatre - East Troy, WI)
5. "What's The Use" (Anastasio, Gordon, McConnell, Fishman) - 6:22 (2010-08-14 Alpine Valley Music Theatre - East Troy, WI)
6. "Possum" (Holdsworth) - 9:53 (2010-08-17 Nikon at Jones Beach Theatre - Wantagh, NY)
7. "N02" (Gordon) - 1:28 (2010-08-12 Verizon Wireless Music Center - Noblesville, IN)
8. "Kung" (Fishman) - 2:04 (2010-08-12 Verizon Wireless Music Center - Noblesville, IN)
9. "Bug" (Anastasio, Marshall) - 9:24 (2010-08-14 Alpine Valley Music Theatre - East Troy, WI)
