= Round Room =

Studio album by Phish
- Released: December 10, 2002
- Recorded: October 5, 6, 18, 19, 2002, The Barn, Vermont
- Genre: Rock
- Length: 77:51
- Label: Elektra
- Producer: Bryce Goggin

Phish chronology
Farmhouse (2000)	Round Room (2002)	The Victor Disc (2002)

Singles from Round Room
- 1. "46 Days" Released: 2002

Professional ratings
Review scores
Source	Rating
Allmusic	2.5/5 stars
Rolling Stone	3/5 stars

Round Room is the tenth studio album by the American rock band Phish released on December 10, 2002, by Elektra Records.

The album was recorded over the span of four days in October 2002, and its release marked the end of the group's two year hiatus from touring and recording.

== Production and release ==
Initially, Phish planned to record the album live at their December 31, 2002 concert at Madison Square Garden in New York City, their first concert since October 2000, but they decided instead to release the songs they had recorded that fall instead.

As with previous Phish albums, the songs originated in collaborative writing sessions between frontman Trey Anastasio and lyricist Tom Marshall (with two songs contributed by bass guitarist Mike Gordon). Round Room is unique, however, in that the final tracks were taken from the band's unedited rehearsal sessions at The Barn, Anastasio's studio in Vermont. Rolling Stone notes that this approach gives the album a "decidedly live" feeling, and "breathes with an anxious, edge-of-the-seat intensity that's missing from their previous studio efforts." Though largely positive, the review criticizes Anastasio's singing and the "Phishspeak" quality of the lyrics.

In the liner notes for the album, Round Room is dedicated to the memory of Widespread Panic guitarist Michael Houser, who died in August 2002, and Scott Schertzer, a Phish fan who was killed in the September 11 attacks in 2001.

Phish appeared on TV twice before their official return to the stage on New Year's Eve 2002. "46 Days" was debuted live on the December 14, 2002, episode of Saturday Night Live, and "All of These Dreams" debuted five days later on the Late Show with David Letterman.

About a week after the release of Round Room, Phish recorded an impromptu jam session in a studio in New York City, excerpts of which were later scheduled for release as The Victor Disc. However, this instrumental album has not yet been officially released.

== Track listing ==
Round Room
No.	Title	Writer(s)	Lead vocals	Length
1.	"Pebbles and Marbles"	Trey Anastasio; Tom Marshall	Anastasio	11:39
2.	"Anything But Me"	Anastasio; Marshall; Scott Herman	Anastasio	4:30
3.	"Round Room"	Mike Gordon; Joseph Linitz	Gordon	4:13
4.	"Mexican Cousin"	Anastasio; Marshall	Anastasio	3:16
5.	"Friday"	Anastasio; Marshall; Herman	Anastasio; Gordon	6:31
6.	"Seven Below"	Anastasio; Marshall	Anastasio with McConnell	8:27
7.	"Mock Song"	Gordon	Gordon	4:29
8.	"46 Days"	Anastasio; Marshall	Anastasio	6:15
9.	"All of These Dreams"	Anastasio; Marshall; Herman	Anastasio	4:08
10.	"Walls of the Cave"	Anastasio; Marshall	Anastasio	9:59
11.	"Thunderhead"	Anastasio; Marshall	Anastasio	3:19
12.	"Waves"	Anastasio; Marshall; Herman	Anastasio with McConnell	11:05
Total length:				77:51

== Personnel ==
Phish

Trey Anastasio – guitars, lead vocals
Page McConnell – keyboards, backing vocals, co-lead vocals (tracks 6, 12)
Mike Gordon – bass guitar, backing vocals, lead vocals (tracks 3, 5, 7)
Jon Fishman – drums, backing vocals
