= Move with You =

Move with You may refer to:

- "Move with You", 2014 single by Jacob Banks (singer)
- "Move with You", 2002 album track by Pork Tornado
