= Gumbo (song) =

Single by Phish

from the album A Live One
- Released: 1995
- Recorded: December 2, 1994, Recreation Hall, University of California, Davis, Davis, CA
- Genre: Rock
- Length: 5:15
- Label: Elektra PRCD 9364-2
- Songwriter(s): Trey Anastasio, Jon Fishman
- Producer(s): Phish

Phish singles chronology
""Bouncing Around the Room" (Live)" (1995)	"Gumbo" (1995)	"Free" (1996)

"Gumbo" is a song by the American band Phish. It is a funk/jazz song written around 1990 by Phish guitarist and lead vocalist Trey Anastasio and drummer Jon Fishman. It is the third track from their 1995 live album A Live One and was released as their ninth promotional single by Elektra Records in 1995.

Like "Split Open and Melt," "Gumbo" started out as a strong tune but one that had a destiny that didn’t lie solely in its composition. A mix of acid jazz and loose funk attended with three-part harmonies and silly lyrics, it had all the ingredients for greatness. The first several versions clearly lacked something, which seemed to be fulfilled with the addition of horns – five times on the Giant Country Horn tour in 1991 and twice with the West Coast return of the horns (in 1994). The (12/2/94) version appears on A Live One (from which it was the second single released) as well as the European compilation, Stash.

== Track listing ==
1. "Gumbo" (Trey Anastasio, Jon Fishman) - 5:15

== Personnel ==
Musicians

Trey Anastasio – guitars, vocals
Page McConnell – keyboards, vocals
Mike Gordon – bass guitar, vocals
Jon Fishman – drums, vocals

== Also appears on ==
- Stash (1996)
- Live Phish Volume 4 (2001)
- Live Phish Volume 10 (2002)
- Live Phish Volume 19 (2003)
- Alpine Valley 2010(DVD) (2010)
