= Trampled by Lambs and Pecked by the Dove =

Studio album by Trey Anastasio and Tom Marshall
- Released: November 1, 2000 (US)
- Recorded: Mountain View Farm, VT - March 1997, May 1997 Kaplan House, VT - October 1997 Mountain Road House, VT - Unknown 1997
- Length: 55:52
- Label: Elektra
- Producer: Trey Anastasio, Tom Marshall

Trey Anastasio and Tom Marshall chronology
One Man's Trash (1998)	Trampled by Lambs and Pecked by the Dove (2000)	Trey Anastasio (2002)

Trampled by Lambs and Pecked by the Dove is a collection of raw tracks and song sketches written and recorded by Trey Anastasio and Phish lyricist Tom Marshall in Vermont farmhouses over four weekends in 1997. The collection was released on November 1, 2000, by Elektra Records.

The songs were recorded to an eight-track digital tape machine as they were being created. Through a long history of collaboration with Anastasio and Phish, Marshall shares writing credit on more than 95 original songs.

Many of the tracks on Trampled by Lambs are early incarnations of songs that would later appear in more polished, and sometimes radically different, versions on the Phish albums The Story of the Ghost (1998) and Farmhouse (2000). A number of other songs have become live staples for both Phish as well as Anastasio's numerous solo projects.

Professional ratings
Review scores
Source	Rating
AMG	link

== Track listing ==
All songs written by Trey Anastasio and Tom Marshall.

1. "Brian and Robert" - 1:40
2. "Limb by Limb" - 3:58
3. "Blue and Shiny" - 2:06
4. "Twist" - 2:34
5. "Wading in the Velvet Sea" - 2:01
6. "Farmhouse" - 3:19
7. "Saw It Again" - 2:47
8. "Piper" - 0:48
9. "Flat Tornados" - 0:48
10. "I Don't Care" - 1:09
11. "Windora Bug" - 0:57
12. "No Regrets" - 1:36
13. "Water in the Sky" - 2:13
14. "Heavy Things" - 2:37
15. "Never" - 1:46
16. "Vultures" - 2:30
17. "Ghost" - 2:01
18. "Dirt" - 3:18
19. "Driver" - 2:19
20. "Sleep" - 2:14
21. "Olivia's Pool" - 1:54
22. "Somantin" - 3:15
23. "Bug" - 4:13
24. "Name" - 1:49
25. "Dogs Stole Things" - 2:00
