= The Siket Disc =

Studio album by Phish
- Released: June 3, 1999
- Recorded: March 11–15 and September 29 – October 2, 1997
- Studios: Bearsville Studios, Woodstock, New York
- Genres: Instrumental rock; funk; jam rock; post-rock; space
- Length: 35:12
- Label: Elektra
- Producer: Phish

Phish chronology
Hampton Comes Alive (1999)	The Siket Disc (1999)	Farmhouse (2000)

Professional ratings
Review scores
Source	Rating
Allmusic	3/5 stars
Pitchfork	8.1/10

The Siket Disc is the eighth studio album by the American rock band Phish. The album was released in June 1999 through the band's website and mail-order service, and was released commercially by Elektra Records on November 7, 2000. Unlike Phish's other records, The Siket Disc is completely instrumental, and its songs are excerpts from studio jams recorded during the sessions for The Story of the Ghost.

== Production ==
The Siket Disc emerged from material developed during the Bearsville Studio sessions for Phish's 1998 album The Story of the Ghost. Not exactly outtakes or unfinished songs, The Siket Disc's compositions are actually select excerpts from the long-form improvisation of the "Ghost Sessions". Phish keyboard player Page McConnell edited and mastered the selections into this compilation, named for engineer John Siket.

The material on The Siket Disc is defined by an almost ambient, post-rock sound that is a distinct departure from the band's major studio albums. The album is almost completely instrumental, but contains a few instances of vocalization. "Quadrophonic Toppling", for instance, includes a triggered sample of bass guitarist Mike Gordon repeating the song's title.

Only the composition "What's the Use?" has been notably incorporated into the band's live shows on a regular basis. (However, "Quadrophonic Toppling", "My Left Toe", and "The Happy Whip and Dung Song" have each made at least one live appearance). Quadrophonic Toppling was most recently performed live on December 29th 2025 at Madison Square Garden which is identical to the studio version.

Gordon has indicated that The Siket Disc became a fixture in the band's late night tour bus music rotation in the early 2000s, saying that "It fit the vibe perfectly ... It's one of the only instances I can remember when we regularly played our own music."

In February 2009, this album was made available as a download in FLAC and MP3 formats at LivePhish.com.

== Track listing ==
All tracks are written by Trey Anastasio, Jon Fishman, Mike Gordon, and Page McConnell.

No.	Title	Length
1.	"My Left Toe"	4:47
2.	"The Name Is Slick"	3:59
3.	"What's the Use?"	11:19
4.	"Fish Bass"	1:11
5.	"Quadrophonic Toppling"	1:58
6.	"The Happy Whip and Dung Song"	5:29
7.	"Insects"	3:11
8.	"Title Track"	1:00
9.	"Albert"	2:18

== Personnel ==
Phish

Trey Anastasio – guitars
Page McConnell – keyboards
Mike Gordon – bass guitar
Jon Fishman – drums

with

John Siket – engineer
