= Pork Tornado =

American rock band

Background information
- Genres: Blues, country music, rock
- Years active: 1997-2002
- Label: Elektra Records
- Past members: Jon Fishman; Dan Archer; Joe Moore; Aaron Hersey; Phil Abair

Pork Tornado is a band co- founded in 1997 by Phish drummer Jon Fishman and record producer/engineer Dan Archer including Fishman (drums, vocals), Archer (guitars, vocals), Joe Moore (saxophone, vocals), Aaron Hersey (bass, vocals), and Phil Abair (keyboards, vocals).

The band played a number of country-western and rock originals as well as a number of standard covers. The group was an occasional side project for Fishman until Phish's hiatus in 2000. By 2002, Pork Tornado was Fishman's main priority. The band released an album in October of that year titled Pork Tornado. They then embarked on their largest tour of the United States shortly thereafter. The tour was followed by a period of inactivity.

As of February 2013, Pork Tornado reunited, for at least one reunion show in South Burlington, Vermont.

Joe Moore died in 2024 at the age of 75.

== Albums ==
- Pork Tornado (October 1, 2002)
  - Track list:
    - Move With You
    - Guabi Guabi
    - Home Is Where You Are
    - When I Get Drunk
    - Blue Skies
    - Kiss My Black Ass
    - Organ
    - Fellini
    - Trousers
    - Chained to a Stump
    - All American
    - Aaron's Blues
