= Free (Phish song) =

Single by Phish

from the album Billy Breathes
- B-side: "Theme from the Bottom"; "Strange Design"
- Released: 1996
- Genre: Psychedelic rock
- Length: 3:49
- Label: Elektra
- Songwriters: Trey Anastasio; Tom Marshall
- Producer: Steve Lillywhite

Phish singles chronology
| "Gumbo (Live)" (1995) | "Free" (1996) | "Character Zero" (1997) |

"Free" is a song by Vermont-based jam band Phish, released as the first single from their 1996 album Billy Breathes. The track reached number 7 on the Billboard Adult Alternative Airplay chart, becoming their first song to reach the top 10 on that (or any) chart. It also reached numbers 11 and 24 on the Mainstream Rock and Alternative Airplay charts, respectively, as their highest chart entry on the former and their only chart entry on the latter. It was also the band's first song to chart in Canada, peaking at No. 68 in 1997.

== Song history ==
"Free" was debuted at a Voters for Choice benefit concert on May 16, 1995 at the Lowell Memorial Auditorium in Lowell, Massachusetts, during which the band debuted several other new songs. The song has been a regular fixture in the band's setlist rotation since its debut with over 200 performances as of 2023. "Free" has also been jammed by the band often, with the longest version, at over 33 minutes in length, played on November 22, 1995 at the USAir Arena in Landover, Maryland.

== Track listing ==
1. "Free" (Trey Anastasio, Tom Marshall) – 3:49
2. "Theme from the Bottom" (Anastasio, Jon Fishman, Mike Gordon, Page McConnell, Marshall) – 6:22
3. "Strange Design" (Anastasio, Marshall) – 3:14

== Personnel ==
- Trey Anastasio – guitar, vocals
- Mike Gordon – bass, vocals
- Jon Fishman – drums
- Page McConnell – piano, vocals

=== Weekly charts ===
| Chart (1996–1997) | Peak position |
|---|---|
| US Adult Alternative Airplay (Billboard) | 7 |
| US Alternative Airplay (Billboard) | 24 |
| US Mainstream Rock (Billboard) | 11 |
