= Joseph Linitz =

American lyricist (born 1965)

Joseph "Joe" Linitz (born 1965) is an American lyricist whose songs, co-written with Phish bassist Mike Gordon, include the title track from Phish's Round Room and Train Song from Billy Breathes.

In addition, Linitz supplied lyrics for the songs "Car Carrier Blues", "With" and "Clay" for Gordon's first album with Leo Kottke, Clone, as well as two songs ("Over the Dam", "Invisible") on the subsequent Gordon/Kottke album Sixty Six Steps. Linitz also cowrote Gov't Mule ballad "Banks of the Deep End" with Gordon and Warren Haynes.

Linitz is the son of Brandeis University professor and Manhattan Project scientist, Henry Linschitz, and an artist mother, Suzanne Hodes. Linitz graduated from Commonwealth School in Boston, and from Oberlin College. Linitz holds a Ph.D. in English from Boston University.
