= Ghost (Phish song) =

Song by Phish

from the album The Story of the Ghost
- Genre: Funk rock, progressive rock
- Length: 3:52
- Songwriters: Anastasio, Marshall

"Ghost" is a song from Phish's 1998 studio album The Story of the Ghost, in the key of A minor, Dorian mode. The lyrics of this song relate to the narrator's encounter with a ghost.

Live versions of "Ghost" are known to be considerably lengthy, as seen in such versions as 1997-07-01, 1997-07-03, 1997-07-23, and 2003-08-03, all of which are above 20 minutes, the latter clocking in at a length of 31:47. Other versions of "Ghost" generally range from 10 to 26 minutes. The studio version of the song, however, clocks in at a mere 3 minutes and 52 seconds.

"Ghost" premiered during Phish's 1997 European tour, on June 13, 1997 in Dublin (Ireland), and has been played 223 times in concert as of October, 2024.

For more on the birth, growth and progression of Ghost, check out Martin Acaster's song history from phish.net.
