= The Story of the Ghost =

Studio album by Phish
- Released: October 27, 1998 (U.S.)
- Recorded: March 11–15, September 29 – October 2, 1997; April–June 1998, Bearsville Studios (Bearsville, New York, U.S.); Additional sessions: March 4–7, April 7–11, 1997, Dave O's Farmhouse
- Genre: Funk rock; jazz-funk; progressive rock
- Length: 49:51
- Label: Elektra
- Producer: Andy Wallace

Phish chronology
| Slip Stitch and Pass (1997) | The Story of the Ghost (1998) | Hampton Comes Alive (1999) |

Singles from The Story of the Ghost
- 1. "Birds of a Feather" Released: 1998; 2. "Wading in the Velvet Sea" Released: 1998

Professional ratings
Review scores
| Source | Rating |
|---|---|
| Allmusic | 2.5/5 stars |
| Rolling Stone | 3.5/5 stars |

The Story of the Ghost is the seventh studio album by American rock band Phish, released by Elektra Records on October 27, 1998. The album features an emphasis on the jazz-funk influenced "cow-funk" style, which the group had been experimenting with in concert throughout 1997 and 1998. The album's first single was "Birds of a Feather", which was a Top 20 hit on Billboard magazine's Adult Alternative Songs chart. The album's cover was painted by visual artist George Condo.

== Sound and production ==
Much of the album originated during large-scale improvisation sessions. The band then took favorite moments from those in-studio jams and wrote songs around them, adding lyrics from a book of writings by long-time Phish lyricist Tom Marshall. Additional excerpts from the improvisational "Ghost Sessions" were also later released as The Siket Disc. The progressive rock song "Guyute" is the only track on the album to pre-date 1997, having first been performed by Phish in 1994.

A few of the album's songs reflect the band's 1997 "cow-funk" sound, with bass guitarist Mike Gordon taking a more prominent role. Anastasio had coined the "cow-funk" term in the band's 1997 official biography The Phish Book, observing that "What we’re doing now is really more about groove than funk. Good funk, real funk, is not played by four white guys from Vermont." Much of the album, however, is defined by what Rolling Stone called an "unhurried vibe ... with airy, uncluttered grooves and relaxed vocals." Unlike Phish's previous albums, The Story of the Ghost does not include any instrumentals. "End of Session" was performed live for the first time on July 25, 2017.

Early incarnations of several tracks from the album can be heard on the 2000 release Trampled by Lambs and Pecked by the Dove, a collection of song sketches recorded by frontman Trey Anastasio and lyricist Tom Marshall.

The album was recorded over the course of several sessions at Bearsville Studios in the village of Bearsville, New York, where the band had also recorded Billy Breathes. The band chose Andy Wallace to produce the album because of his work on Reign in Blood by Slayer, Nevermind by Nirvana and Grace by Jeff Buckley.

"Birds of a Feather", "Frankie Says", and "Shafty" (the latter song a reworking of Phish original "Olivia's Pool") were all debuted live during the "Island Tour", a brief run of shows the band played while taking a break from recording the album in April 1998. All four nights of the "Island Tour" were later released as part of the LivePhish Series.

In 2000, during the promotion for Farmhouse, many interviews saw Anastasio citing a certain disdain for the process of creating The Story of the Ghost. He was critical of the band's "socialistic" approach to the song selection for the album. "There were songs I thought should have gone on The Story of the Ghost album, that were better than the songs that got on there", Anastasio said in a 2000 interview. "If anyone didn't like a song it was out. But what happens with that approach is the material gets watered down. You end up with songs that everyone is fine with, but the best songs are usually those where one person is passionately for and one person really hates, because the best songs are those that arouse strong reactions".

Tom Marshall recalls that one of these stronger songs was omitted in favor of what he felt was a weaker track in "Fikus". Anastasio named "Bug" and "Twist" as two songs he was disappointed were cut from the album, and both later appeared on Farmhouse. In 2018, Marshall had Anastasio as a guest on his Under the Scales podcast to discuss the 20th anniversary of The Story of the Ghost, and both conceded they were now happy with the album as it was released, with Marshall revising his opinion of "Fikus" to a more positive one.

In February 2009, The Story of the Ghost was made available as a download in FLAC and MP3 formats at LivePhish.com.

== Track listing ==
The Story of the Ghost track listing
| No. | Title | Writer(s) | Lead vocals | Length |
|---|---|---|---|---|
| 1. | "Ghost" | Trey Anastasio; Tom Marshall | Anastasio with Fishman | 3:52 |
| 2. | "Birds of a Feather" | Anastasio; Fishman; Mike Gordon; Page McConnell; Marshall | Anastasio | 4:15 |
| 3. | "Meat" | Anastasio; Fishman; Gordon; McConnell; Marshall | Gordon with Anastasio | 2:39 |
| 4. | "Guyute" | Anastasio; Marshall | Anastasio | 8:27 |
| 5. | "Fikus" | Anastasio; Fishman; Gordon; McConnell; Marshall | Gordon with Anastasio | 2:21 |
| 6. | "Shafty" | Anastasio; Fishman; Gordon; McConnell; Marshall | Anastasio | 2:21 |
| 7. | "Limb by Limb" | Anastasio; Marshall; Herman | Anastasio with McConnell | 3:32 |
| 8. | "Frankie Says" | Anastasio; Fishman; Gordon; McConnell; Marshall | McConnell | 3:07 |
| 9. | "Brian and Robert" | Anastasio; Marshall | Anastasio | 3:03 |
| 10. | "Water in the Sky" | Anastasio; Marshall | Anastasio | 2:29 |
| 11. | "Roggae" | Anastasio; Fishman; Gordon; McConnell; Marshall | Anastasio, Fishman, Gordon and McConnell | 2:59 |
| 12. | "Wading in the Velvet Sea" | Anastasio; Marshall | McConnell | 4:30 |
| 13. | "The Moma Dance" | Anastasio; Fishman; Gordon; McConnell; Marshall | Anastasio and Fishman | 4:28 |
| 14. | "End of Session" | Anastasio; Fishman; Gordon; McConnell; Marshall | Anastasio | 1:54 |

== Personnel ==
From the band's website:

Phish

Trey Anastasio – guitars, lead vocals, horn arrangement for "Birds of a Feather", co-lead vocals on "Meat" and "Fikus"
Page McConnell – keyboards, backing vocals, lead vocals on "Frankie Says" and "Wading in the Velvet Sea" and "Roggae", co-lead vocals on "Limb by Limb"
Mike Gordon – bass guitar, pedal steel, backing vocals, lead vocals on "Meat", "Fikus", and "Roggae"
Jon Fishman – drums, backing vocals, lead vocals on "Roggae", and "The Moma Dance", co-lead vocals on "Ghost"

Additional musicians and production staff

Andy Wallace – producer, mixer

Recorded at Bearsville Studios, Bearsville, NY April – June 1998

Chris Shaw – engineer
Chris Laidlaw – assistant recording engineer
Dave Grippo – saxophone on "Birds of a Feather"
James Harvey – trombone on "Birds of a Feather"
Jennifer Hartswick – trumpet on "Birds of a Feather"
Heloise Williams – background vocals on "Birds of a Feather" and "Shafty"

Additional Recording Sessions: Bearsville Studios 3/11–15, 9/29–10/2, 1997

John Siket – recording engineer
Chris Laidlaw – assistant recording engineer

Dave O's Farmhouse 3/4–7, 4/7–11, 1998 Recorded by Phish and Andy Wallace

Mixed at Soundtracks Studios, NY, NY June/July 1998

Steve Sisco – assistant mix engineer

Mastered by Howie Weinberg at Masterdisk July 1998

Pre-Production Digital Editing: John Billingsly

Management: John Paluska/Dionysian Productions

Production Assistance: Beth Montuori, Brad Sands
Technical Assistance: Paul Languedoc, Pete Carini, Kevin Brown, Brian Brown

Paintings by George Condo
Art Direction: Lili Picou
Project Management: Cynthia Brown and Jason Colton
