= Farmhouse (album) =

Studio album by Phish
- Released: May 16, 2000
- Recorded: July 18, 1999 ("Piper"); October 1999 – February 2000
- Studios: Oswego County Airport, Volney, New York ("Piper"); The Barn, Chittenden County, Vermont
- Genres: Americana; country rock; Latin rock; pop; folk rock; rock
- Length: 49:34
- Label: Elektra
- Producers: Bryce Goggin, Trey Anastasio

Phish chronology
The Siket Disc (1999)	Farmhouse (2000)	Round Room (2002)

Singles from Farmhouse
- 1. "Heavy Things" Released: 2000

Farmhouse is the ninth studio album by the American rock band Phish. The album was released on May 16, 2000, by Elektra Records.

The album's first single, "Heavy Things", was one of Phish's most successful radio hits; it was the band's only song to appear on a mainstream pop radio format, reaching number 29 on Billboard's Adult Top 40 chart that July. The song also became the band's biggest hit to date on the Adult Alternative Songs chart, reaching number 2 there. The song had previously been performed for live broadcast during the overnight set of Phish's New Year's Eve 2000 show at Big Cypress as part of ABC's coverage of New Year's festivities around the globe.

Owing in part to the mainstream exposure of "Heavy Things", Farmhouse had the highest-ever first week sales for a Phish record. The album was certified gold by RIAA on January 30, 2006.

== Production ==
Songwriting for Farmhouse was a joint effort between Trey Anastasio and Phish lyricist Tom Marshall, with contributions from Tony Markellis, Russ Lawton and Scott Herman. All of the songs were already part of Phish's live concert song rotation before being recorded for the album, some dating back to 1997. The tracks were recorded at The Barn, frontman Trey Anastasio's studio in Chittenden County, Vermont. The introduction to "Piper" is an extract from the band's live performance of the song on July 18, 1999, at their Camp Oswego Festival in Volney, New York. There is also a Japanese version of the album available as an import which include two bonus studio out-take tracks from the Farmhouse recording sessions which are "Driver" and "Mist" (sometimes referred to as "Mountains in the Mist"). These two songs are currently not available in any format online by Phish although as of December 2018 it can be purchased in its original CD format on Amazon.com and possibly elsewhere for about twice the price of the standard version of the album.

Early incarnations of several tracks from the album can be heard on the 2000 release Trampled by Lambs and Pecked by the Dove, a collection of song sketches and demos recorded by Anastasio and Marshall.

The song "First Tube" was nominated for a Grammy for Best Rock Instrumental Performance.

In February 2009, the album was made available as a download in FLAC and MP3 formats at LivePhish.com.

A new 2-LP vinyl version of the album was announced on May 31, 2023, for an official release on June 30, 2023, sourced from the original 1/2" master reels. The original version of the record on vinyl was on one single LP, sourced from digital.

== Critical reception ==
Professional ratings
Review scores
Source	Rating
AllMusic	4.5/5 stars
Encyclopedia of Popular Music	4/5 stars
Jambands: The Complete Guide to the Players, Music, & Scene	4.5/5 stars
Entertainment Weekly	B / B+
Los Angeles Times	2.5/4 stars
Q	4/5 stars
Rolling Stone	2.5/5 stars
The Rolling Stone Album Guide	4/5 stars
Spin	7/10
The Village Voice	B−

Farmhouse received mainly positive reviews. Jason Ankeny of AllMusic praised the album as Phish's "rootsiest and most organic effort to date... [and] also their most fully developed – these are complete, concise songs and not simply outlines for extended jams, boasting a beauty and intimacy which expands the group's scope even as it serves notice of a newfound pop accessibility."

Rolling Stone's Jon Pareles, however, gave Farmhouse a mediocre rating of only 2.5 stars. The review states that on the album the band walks "a thin line between mellow and torpid" with songs that "are going to need a lot of live (concert) resuscitation".

== Track listing ==
Farmhouse
No.	Title	Writer(s)	Length
1.	"Farmhouse"	Trey Anastasio, Tom Marshall	4:02
2.	"Twist"	Anastasio, Marshall	3:24
3.	"Bug"	Anastasio, Marshall	5:07
4.	"Back on the Train"	Anastasio, Marshall	3:02
5.	"Heavy Things"	Anastasio, Scott Herman, Marshall	4:15
6.	"Gotta Jibboo"	Anastasio, Russ Lawton, Tony Markellis	5:31
7.	"Dirt"	Anastasio, Herman, Marshall	4:32
8.	"Piper"	Anastasio, Marshall	4:27
9.	"Sleep"	Anastasio, Marshall	2:09
10.	"The Inlaw Josie Wales"	Anastasio	2:56
11.	"Sand"	Anastasio, Lawton, Markellis, Marshall	3:24
12.	"First Tube"	Anastasio, Lawton, Markellis	6:45
Total length:			49:34

== Charting singles ==
2000, Heavy Things (No. 22, Adult Top 40)

== Personnel ==
Phish

- Trey Anastasio – guitars, lead vocals, horn and string arrangements
- Page McConnell – keyboards, backing vocals
- Mike Gordon – bass guitar, backing vocals
- Jon Fishman – drums, backing vocals

Additional musicians

- Jerry Douglas – dobro on "The Inlaw Josie Wales"
- John Dunlop – cello on "Dirt"
- Roy Feldman – viola on "Dirt"
- Béla Fleck – banjo on "The Inlaw Josie Wales"
- Dave Grippo – saxophone on "Gotta Jibboo"
- David Gusakov – violin on "Dirt"
- Jennifer Hartswick – trumpet on "Gotta Jibboo"
- James Harvey – trombone on "Gotta Jibboo"
- Laura Markowitz – violin on "Dirt"
- Andy Moroz – trombone on "Gotta Jibboo"
