= Billy Breathes =

Studio album by Phish
- Released: October 15, 1996
- Recorded: February–June 1996
- Studio: Bearsville (Woodstock, New York)
- Genre: Folk rock; psychedelic pop; roots rock
- Length: 47:01
- Label: Elektra
- Producer: Steve Lillywhite

Phish chronology
Stash (1996)	Billy Breathes (1996)	Slip Stitch and Pass (1997)

Singles from Billy Breathes
- 1. "Free" Released: 1996; 2. "Character Zero" Released: 1997

Professional ratings
Review scores
Source	Rating
Allmusic	4/5 stars
Chicago Tribune	2.5/4 stars
The Encyclopedia of Popular Music	4/5 stars
Entertainment Weekly	B−
Jambands: The Complete Guide to the Players, Music, & Scene	4.5/5 stars
NME	3/10
Rolling Stone	4/5 stars
Select	1/5
The Village Voice	(dud)

Billy Breathes is the sixth studio album by American rock band Phish, released by Elektra Records on October 15, 1996. The album was credited with connecting the band, known for its jam band concerts and devoted cult following, with a more mainstream audience. The first single, "Free", was the band's most successful song on two Billboard rock charts, peaking at #11 on the Billboard Mainstream Rock Tracks Chart and at #24 on the Billboard Modern Rock Tracks Chart. The album itself became the band's highest-charting album on the Billboard 200, where it peaked at number seven.

Billy Breathes was produced by Steve Lillywhite and recorded at Bearsville Studios in Bearsville, New York between February and June 1996, following Phish's landmark fall 1995 tour. The songs "Free", "Taste", "Cars Trucks Buses", "Theme from the Bottom", "Billy Breathes" and "Prince Caspian" were debuted in concert by Phish over the course of 1995, with the remaining songs not appearing in the band's concert repertoire until after the album's release. "Bliss" was not played live by the band until December 30, 2018, 22 years after the release of the album.

The album and its title song were named after guitarist Trey Anastasio's daughter Eliza, who was nicknamed "Billy" as an infant. The album's cover is a close-up shot of bass guitar player Mike Gordon, the first time that any member of Phish had appeared on an album cover. Phish frontman Trey Anastasio recalled in a 1997 interview that the cover came together very quickly on the last day of recording.

The album was certified Gold by the Recording Industry Association of America on January 8, 1999. The album was reissued on LP by Phish's label JEMP Records for Record Store Day in 2018.

== Recording ==
Early song ideas came from a scuba diving trip that Trey Anastasio and Tom Marshall went on in the Cayman Islands in January 1996. They then produced a demo which was given to the other band members at the start of the Billy Breathes sessions. Other songs such as "Free" and "Taste" had already been in the band's live rotation since 1995.

The album was recorded between February and June 1996 at the now defunct Bearsville Studios in the Catskills region of New York state. Early recording started February 1, with the band intending to produce the album themselves with engineering by John Siket. The first recording project was an attempt to create a sonic "blob" that filled an entire reel of tape. Each band member contributed on several instruments. This idea was later abandoned but elements were used on the tracks "Swept Away" and "Steep".

Rough mixes of songs were made after recording for most of February and March. The band took a break from recording beginning on March 20, and each listened to the rough mixes during their time off. Rough mixes included the songs "Free", "Grind", two versions of "Strange Design", "Swept Away/Steep", "Talk", "Waste" and "Weekly Time". Phish performed at the New Orleans Jazz & Heritage Festival in April and then returned to Bearsville on May 1 to resume recording.

With the resumption of recording, Steve Lillywhite joined as producer on the recommendation of Dave Matthews. Lillywhite had never heard of Phish before he joined the Billy Breathes sessions. He reflected in February 2011:

"Phish, for me, are the musical equivalent of watching a flock of birds fly across the sky: They don't scatter every which way, but rather, they move with each other; they dip and dive, they go up and down; but at all times, they seem to have this radar, this instinct, for where the bird in front or in back of them is going. Musically, each member of Phish knows what the other is doing, which then carries over to the whole. The band can play anything, which then raises the question: Well, what should they play? With Billy Breathes, it's the closest they got to making what I would say is a good stoner album. You know what I mean: you put on the CD, you fire up a big one and you just go down that road. There hadn't been a good stoner record since Dark Side Of The Moon. Billy Breathes got close. I keep telling Trey Anastasio we can make a better one."

After Lillywhite joined, many of the songs were recorded in the early morning hours. "We did a lot of that album at five in the morning, when the sun was coming up. It kind of sounds like that, especially the stuff on side two like 'Billy Breathes' and 'Prince Caspian', 'Swept Away' all that stuff was recorded as the sun was coming up," said Trey in a 1997 interview. On June 6, 1996, near the end of the sessions, the band played a surprise show in the neighboring town of Woodstock at a local bar called Joyous Lake.

In a 2011 interview, Anastasio recalled his method for composing the guitar solo for the track "Billy Breathes":

On the song "Billy Breathes" there's a guitar solo I like a lot. That's a composed solo. I didn't labor over it. What I did is, I walked around the kitchen—my daughter had just been born and we were living out in the woods in Vermont. I was in my union suit, chopping wood. I was not thinking about anything, and then I just started singing [sings melody] the first four notes of the solo. I had a cassette player and I'd run over and get it recorded. Then I'd forget about it. And then the next part came. It was a lot of wearing headphones while walking around. Cassette player in my pocket. Change a diaper, go to the store, and whenever I can disconnect from whoever I'm talking to in the room, I'd put on my headphones. So the point I'm making is that it still felt like improv."

The song "Strange Design", which the band had been playing live since May 1995, was recorded during the Billy Breathes sessions but was left off the album. The band recorded several versions of the track before settling on a final version. This was later included on the Free European single CD release. Phish lyricist Tom Marshall spoke of the "Strange Design" outtake in 1996:

"It was scrapped at the last second. The band was touring in Europe at the time and made the painful decision there – in Italy or France I think. The album was complete and about to be mastered. "Design" was to be the last song on the album – after Caspian. It was a bizarre version that no one ever really got used to. It was funny though – the second they got back to the States and played it in their new acoustic setup it was as strong as ever. It just couldn't be captured in the studio for whatever reason. Cutting it was one of those great decisions – after working so long and hard on the song, sacrificing it for the good of the album took a very wide focus – as much thought went into cutting it as went into recording it."

Trey Anastasio recalled in a 1997 interview that the cover came together very quickly on the last day of recording.

"We finished Billy Breathes and our manager kept saying, "What are you going to do about the cover?" So, finally, it was the LAST day, and it was, like three in the morning. They (management) said, "We NEED a cover tomorrow." You know all those pictures on the back? We cut them out and stuck them on with scotch tape. Mike was on the cover he just shot a picture of himself. The whole thing took like five minutes!"

In a 2007 interview, Tom Marshall said that Trey Anastasio thought the album cover of Mike Gordon's face ruined the entire album, a feeling Marshall himself shared as well.

== Critical reception ==
Upon release, Rolling Stone said that Billy Breathes is "a quiet gem of an album" that confirms Phish "is much more than a jam band from Burlington, Vermont." Writing for the NME, Ian Phortnam criticised the band and its fans, and said that the album was "a sad and directionless phlounder."

== Track listing ==
No.	Title	Writer(s)	Lead vocals	Length
1.	"Free"	Anastasio; Marshall	Anastasio	3:49
2.	"Character Zero"	Anastasio; Marshall	Anastasio	4:00
3.	"Waste"	Anastasio; Marshall	Anastasio	4:50
4.	"Taste"	Anastasio; Fishman; Gordon; McConnell; Marshall	Anastasio; Fishman	4:07
5.	"Cars Trucks Buses"	McConnell	instrumental	2:25
6.	"Talk"	Anastasio; Marshall	Anastasio	3:09
7.	"Theme from the Bottom"	Anastasio; Fishman; Gordon; McConnell; Marshall	Anastasio	6:22
8.	"Train Song"	Gordon; Joseph Linitz	Gordon with Anastasio	2:33
9.	"Bliss"	Anastasio	instrumental	2:03
10.	"Billy Breathes"	Anastasio	Anastasio	5:31
11.	"Swept Away"	Anastasio; Marshall	Anastasio	1:16
12.	"Steep"	Anastasio; Fishman; Gordon; McConnell; Marshall	Anastasio	1:37
13.	"Prince Caspian"	Anastasio; Marshall	Anastasio	5:19
Total length:				47:01

== Personnel ==
Phish:

- Trey Anastasio – guitars, lead vocals, co-lead vocals on "Train Song", art direction
- Mike Gordon – bass guitar, backing vocals, co-lead vocals on "Train Song", cover photo, art direction
- Jon Fishman – drums, backing vocals, percussion on "Train Song", co-lead vocals on "Taste", art direction
- Page McConnell – keyboards, backing vocals, art direction

Additional personnel

- Danny Clinch – photography
- Chris Laidlaw – assistant engineering
- Steve Lillywhite – mixing, production
- Bob Ludwig – mastering
- Jon Siket – mixing, recording
- David Welker – painting
