= Jon Fishman =

American drummer

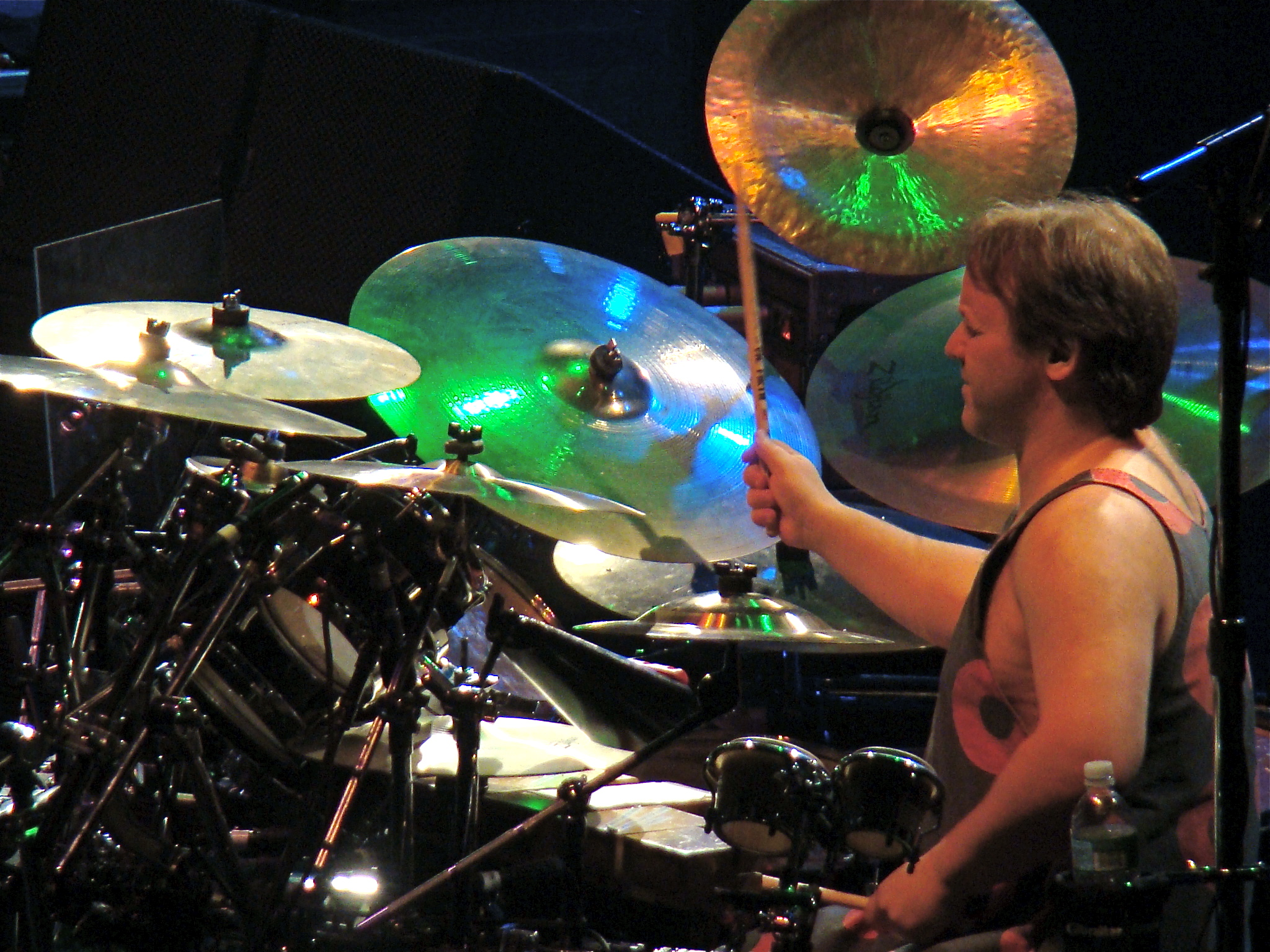
- Jon Fishman performing with Phish at Madison Square Garden on December 3, 2009.

Background information
- Also known as: Fish, Henrietta, Bob Weaver
- Born: February 19, 1965 (age 61); Philadelphia, Pennsylvania, U.S.
- Genres: Rock; jam; psychedelic; funk; progressive rock
- Occupations: Musician; selectmen
- Instruments: Drums; vacuum cleaner; vocals
- Years active: 1983–present
- Member of: Phish; Pork Tornado; Jazz Mandolin Project; Ghosts of the Forest
- Formerly of: Surrender to the Air; Everyone Orchestra; J. Willis Pratt and We're Bionic; Touchpants; Mallett Brothers Band; Phil and Friends

Jon Fishman (born February 19, 1965) is an American drummer and co-founder of the band Phish, which was, in part, named after him. He is credited with co-writing nineteen Phish songs, eight with a solo credit.

== Early life ==
Fishman was born in Philadelphia and grew up in Syracuse, New York. Fishman had a passion for the drums from an early age and emulated John Bonham, the drummer for Led Zeppelin, Bill Bruford of Yes and King Crimson, along with Keith Moon of The Who. He went to Jamesville-Dewitt High School in a suburb of Syracuse. After graduation in 1983, he attended the University of Vermont to study engineering. Shortly after his arrival, he met Mike Gordon and Trey Anastasio and founded the band Phish. Deciding against engineering, he and Anastasio transferred to Goddard College.

== Musical career ==
=== Phish ===
The band Phish was named after him (he is commonly referred to as "Fish" among many other nicknames), though other explanations for the name have been given. In addition to drumming, he also sings back-up vocals and occasionally lead-vocals (usually on cover songs, most of them humorous – the best examples are Prince's "Purple Rain", Syd Barrett’s "Love You", and "Terrapin", Neil Diamond's "Cracklin' Rosie", Will Smith's song "Gettin' Jiggy Wit It", and Syd Barrett-era Pink Floyd's "Bike"). Worthy of note are his more serious vocal efforts, including lead vocals on Phish's cover of the Talking Heads song "Crosseyed and Painless", and his vocal duties on the Phish originals, "The Moma Dance", "Taste", and "Ghost". He is well known on tour for his Electrolux vacuum cleaner solos and playing while wearing a donut-printed muumuu dress. He has admitted to taking acid before playing early in the band's career.

Fishman regularly performs with Phish wearing a blue muumuu dress with a pattern of red annuli. In 2015, Phish filed to trademark the pattern on Fishman's dress, but the request was tentatively denied by the United States Patent and Trademark Office.

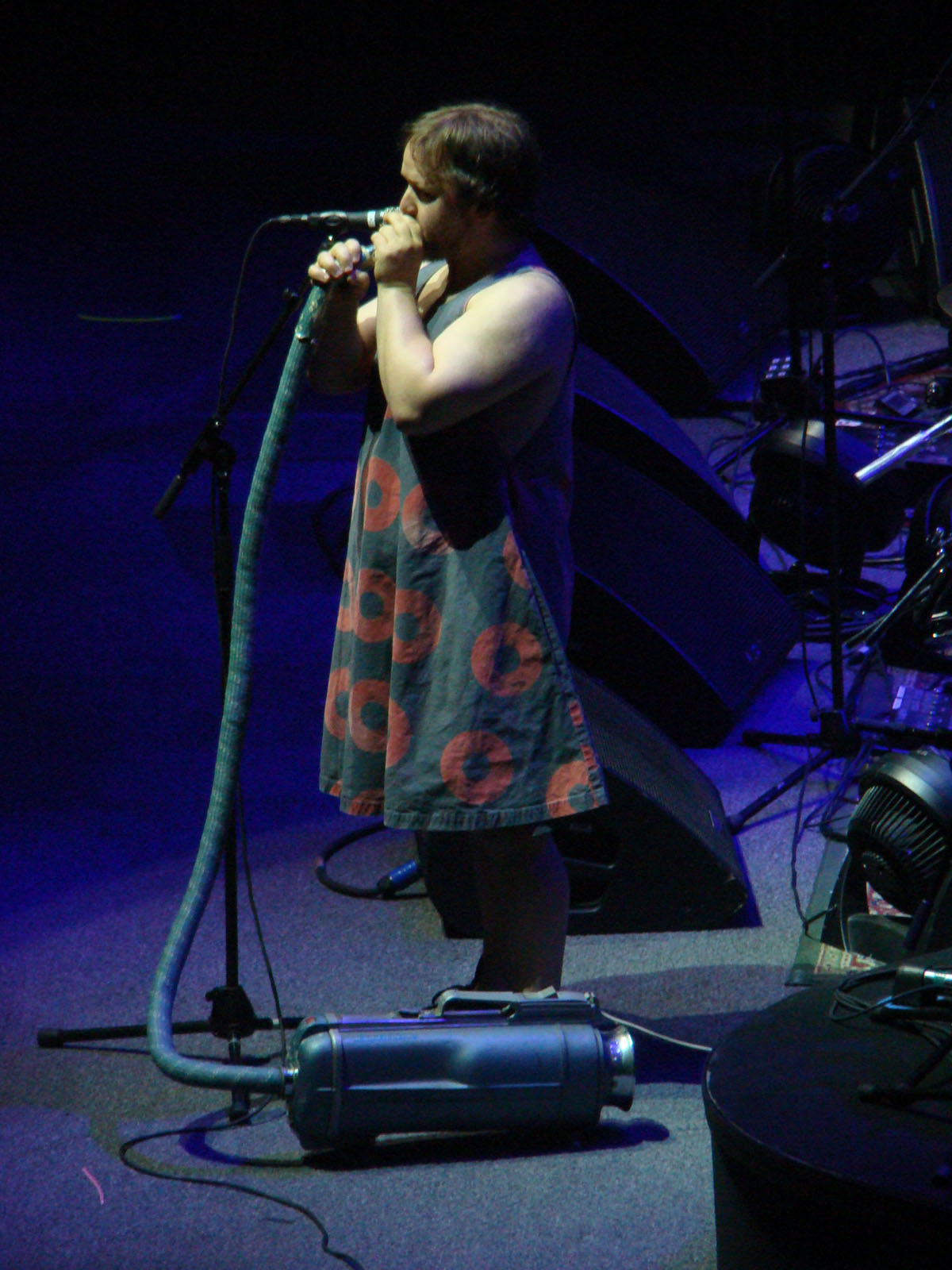
Playing his Electrolux vacuum with Phish at American Airlines Arena in Miami, FL 12-28-2009 Photo: Dan Shinneman

== Equipment ==
Fishman uses a variety of drums and cymbals on his kit; brands such as Noble & Cooley, Gretsch, Ludwig, Yamaha, Ayotte, Eames, Zildjian, Sabian, Paiste, and Wuhan. He also uses Remo drum heads, Vic Firth drum sticks, and LP percussion accessories. His setup consists of:

- 22x14 AYOTTE round badge bass drum.
- 6x6 Noble & Cooley tom (in Black Finish)
- 8x7 Noble & Cooley tom
- 10x7 Noble & Cooley tom
- 12x8 Noble & Cooley tom
- 14x12 Gretsch Floor Tom
- 16x14 Gretsch Floor Tom
- 14x6.5 Ayotte 18-Ply Maple Snare (or 14x6.5 Precision 21-Ply Maple Snare w/ custom 3D phish logo).

Cymbals include:

- 14" hi-hats (Zildjian K Light Hats)
- 13" Paiste Mega Cup Chime
- 15" Istanbul Agop Medium Thin Crash
- 8" Zildjian A Custom Splash
- 16" Zildjian K Thin Crash
- 17" Sabian Cymbals HH Crash
- 21" Sabian AA Dry Ride
- 20" Zildjian A Custom Flat Ride w/ rivets
- 18" Zildjian Oriental China Trash
- 22" Zildjian Pang

He uses an LP Black Beauty cowbell, an LP Rock Ridge Rider cowbell, and a set of 4 LP temple blocks.

He uses Vic Firth drum sticks. His preferred "perfect pair" is the Peter Erskine Ride Stick and the SD4 Combo. He uses TG12 Sticks for practice, Vic Firth and Regal Tip Brushes, and Vic Firth T1 Mallets.

He uses Remo drum heads. His preferred setup:

- Snare: Coated Ambassador; Bottom: Clear Diplomat
- Toms: Clear Emperors; Bottoms: Clear Emperors
- Kick: Coated Powerstroke 3; Bottoms: Ebony Ambassador

Fishman's Vacuum-A baby blue Electrolux vacuum cleaner (a.k.a. the vac or 'lux) has been in the repertoire (played as an instrument by Fishman) since circa 1989. An earlier, 1967 model was donated to the Hard Rock Cafe 1/29/93. The currently in-use model is circa 1965.

On rare occasions, Fishman will play the theremin.

== Other musical projects ==
Fishman was a past member of the Vermont band "Touchpants" and no longer participates. He also used to play drums in the rock band Pork Tornado, and performed with the Jazz Mandolin Project for several years. He has been a member of two large musical collectives, The Everyone Orchestra and The Village. In 2007, he emerged from semi-retirement to perform a series of shows with the Yonder Mountain String Band, including a large portion of their set at the Rothbury Music Festival which happened the summer of 2008.

The Mimi Fishman Foundation is a nonprofit organization started by Jon to raise money for various charities, especially for charities that benefit the visually impaired. The charity was named for Jon's mother, Mimi, who had glaucoma. Fishman was also a member of fellow Phish member Trey Anastasio's side-project Ghosts of the Forest.

== Personal life ==
Fishman and his five children live in Lincolnville, Maine. The family appeared on an episode of the Magnolia Network home restoration series Maine Cabin Masters in March 2018. He is a fan of the deathgrind band Cattle Decapitation and guested on their 2019 album, Death Atlas.

=== Radio ===
He has hosted a radio show on WBFY-LP, a community radio station in Belfast, Maine, since 2017. The show was originally called the Jonny B. Fishman Radio Show, but has since changed its name to The Errant Path. Fishman hosts the show weekly on Thursday evenings when Phish is not on tour.

=== Politics ===
Fishman was inspired by former Nirvana bassist Krist Novoselic to take action in his local elections. Fishman publicly endorsed Senator Bernie Sanders in both the 2016 and 2020 Democratic primaries. In 2017, he was voted a selectman of Lincolnville, Maine. He did not run for reelection in 2020.
