= Under the Sound Umbrella =

Studio album by The Dude of Life
- Released: June 8, 1999
- Label: Phoenix Rising
- Producer: The Dude of Life

The Dude of Life chronology
Crimes Of the Mind (1994)	Under the Sound Umbrella (1999)

Under the Sound Umbrella is the second album from The Dude of Life, a childhood friend of Phish leader Trey Anastasio and a lyrical contributor to many of Phish's early songs. This was the first album released by the Dude of Life in almost five years.

The album features guest appearances from Phish members Anastasio, Mike Gordon, and Jon Fishman. "Tow Truck Driver" is a collaboration between the Dude of Life and Anastasio.

The Dude's backing band on the album is The Great Red Shark.

The album has been out of print since 2000.

In writing about the album, William Ruhlmann at Allmusic said that it has "quirky lyrics that border on novelties" with a style reminiscent of the Beatles and David Bowie.

== Track listing ==
1. "Beware Of The Dog"
2. "Francella"
3. "Tow Truck Driver"
4. "Come On Up To My Room"
5. "Puppydog Named Madness"
6. "Paparazzi"
7. "Scuba Dive"
8. "Pete Rose"
9. "Sound Umbrella"
10. "What You Do To Me"

== Personnel ==
- The Dude of Life: vocals
- Trey Anastasio: guitar
- Dan Archer: guitar
- Cliff Mays: guitar
- Mike Gordon: bass
- Aaron Hersey: bass
- Paul Gassman: bass
- Phil Abair: keyboards
- Mark Thors: keyboards
- Brian Bull: piano, cowbell
- Jon Fishman: drums
- Jim Weingast: drums
- Erica Lynn Gruenberg: background vocals
- Maura Murphy: background vocals
