= Phish: Live in Vegas =

- Starring: Phish
- Release date: November 12, 2002
- Running time: 172 mins

Phish: Live in Vegas (2000) is a video of a complete live performance by the rock band Phish recorded at the Thomas & Mack Center on September 30, 2000, bandleader Trey Anastasio's 36th birthday. It includes many rarities and songs that were brought out of "retirement" after long periods of inactivity.

The performance was originally a live Internet webcast that came just days after Phish officially announced an indefinite break from recording and touring. Anastasio used the narration segment that bridges "Colonel Forbin's Ascent" and "Fly Famous Mockingbird" to officially announce the hiatus to audiences across the globe via the Internet.

Also included are tracks from the following night's performance in Phoenix, Arizona.

This was the first uncut concert DVD released by Phish, the second being Phish: Live in Brooklyn, released on July 11, 2006.

== Track listing ==
* Bonus footage was recorded in Phoenix on October 1, 2000 and appears in the 'Extras' section of the DVD.

=== Set one ===
1. "Walfredo" (Anastasio, Fishman, Gordon, McConnell) - 7:14
2. "The Curtain With" (Anastasio, Daubert) - 13:06
3. "Maze" (Anastasio, Marshall) - 11:05
4. "Roggae" (Anastasio, Fishman, Gordon, Marshall, McConnell) - 8:24
5. "I Didn't Know" (Wright) - 4:16
6. "Mike's Song" (Gordon) - 8:46
7. "Simple" (Gordon) - 6:25
8. "Saw It Again" (Anastasio, Marshall) - 6:27
9. "Esther" (Anastasio) - 9:08
10. "Weekapaug Groove" (Anastasio, Fishman, Gordon, McConnell) - 11:20

=== Set two ===
1. "Timber" (White) - 8:31
2. "AC/DC Bag" (Anastasio) - 9:25
3. "Colonel Forbin's Ascent" (Anastasio) - 5:39
4. "Fly Famous Mockingbird" (Anastasio) - 15:35
5. "Twist" (Anastasio, Marshall) - 10:36
6. "Sand" (Anastasio, Lawton, Markellis, Marshall) - 12:37
7. "A Day in the Life" (Lennon, McCartney) - 7:14

=== Encore ===
1. "Emotional Rescue" (Jagger, Richards) - 14:43

=== Bonus footage ===
1. "Piper" (Anastasio, Marshall) - 22:13 *
2. "Camel Walk" (Holdsworth) - 5:38 *

== Personnel ==
Phish

- Trey Anastasio - guitars, lead vocals, keyboards on "Walfredo" and "Sand", drums on "I Didn't Know", narration on "Fly Famous Mockingbird"
- Page McConnell - keyboards, backing vocals, drums on "Walfredo", co-lead vocals on "Roggae" and "A Day in the Life"
- Mike Gordon - bass guitar, backing vocals, guitar on "Walfredo", co-lead vocals on "Roggae", lead vocals on "Mike's Song" and "Emotional Rescue"
- Jon Fishman - drums, backing vocals, bass guitar on "Walfredo", vacuum on "I Didn't Know", co-lead vocals on "Roggae"
