= Phish festivals =

Festival series by the American jam band

Starting in 1996, American jam band Phish has hosted a series of festivals—eleven in total, each attended by many tens of thousands. They are typically the only band to perform at the festivals, although the 1998 Lemonwheel festival and 1999 Camp Oswego festival both featured a second stage for supporting acts.

== The Clifford Ball ==
The Clifford Ball
- Genre: Jam band
- Dates: scheduled: August 16–17, 1996
- Locations: Plattsburgh, New York
- Years active: 1996 (The first of Phish's festivals)
- Founders: Phish

The Clifford Ball was the first weekend-long festival hosted by Phish throughout their career. The event took place on August 16 and 17, 1996, at the former Plattsburgh Air Force Base in Plattsburgh, New York, about one hour west from Phish's home base of Burlington, Vermont. The event was named after Clifford Ball, a man who held events for aviators such as Amelia Earhart. The Clifford Ball was a proposed name for the 1990s traveling festival that ultimately was named H.O.R.D.E.

The name Clifford Ball had been known to the band for some five years before The Clifford Ball took place. According to Phish Manager, John Paluska, "The band was walking through the airport in Pittsburgh one day, and they came upon a small, little plaque of a guy named Clifford Ball... it said 'Clifford Ball: a beacon of light in the world of flight.' ...they just thought the [expression] was the funniest idea for a show..."

The event combined overhead flights by bombers, fighters, gliders, and various other aerial vehicles with carnival rides, jugglers, and men on stilts. Three gigantic video screens and four sound towers were erected to amplify the band. Phish, the marquee band who headlined the event, were joined by a classical violin quartet, a blues quartet, a choral quintet, and guitar soloists. The "Clifford Ball Orchestra" performed an afternoon set of pieces by Debussy, Ravel, and Stravinsky. Phish performed seven sets of music over the two nights, including a late night set on a flatbed truck that rolled through the parking lot in the wee hours of the morning.

70,000 people attended, making the event Phish's largest concert up to that point and the largest rock concert in the United States in that year. The audience was four times the size of surrounding city of Plattsburgh, making Plattsburgh the ninth most-populous city in New York that weekend, and adding $20 million into the local economy. Despite the size of the concert, it received very little coverage from the mainstream media. MTV aired a documentary of the experience, using footage from Phish's production company, Dionysian Productions. Phish released a seven-DVD box set on March 3, 2009, chronicling the band's seven sets and including bonus documentary footage.

Setlists: Day 1 Day 2

== The Great Went ==
The Great Went was the sequel to The Clifford Ball, taking place on August 16 and 17, 1997, close to the Canada–US border at the Loring Air Force Base in Limestone, Maine. The event was named after a quote from the movie Twin Peaks: Fire Walk with Me.

The world's largest fire truck hosed down thousands of fans as they arrived Saturday morning, and on Sunday morning, approximately 1,100 people posed nude as part of a fifty-state tour by photographer Spencer Tunick. Throughout the weekend, the members of the audience each painted their own individual piece of art. The resultant pieces of fan artwork were attached to one another to create a tower that was eventually several stories high. The band also created their own piece of art during a jam on the final night. Later that evening, the band passed their artwork through the audience. To create a connection between audience and band, the band's artwork was attached to the fan artwork. As seen in Bittersweet Motel, a giant matchstick was lit, burning the tower to the ground.

Phish was the only band that played the main stage, performing seven sets of music over two nights, including a late night disco set at 2:30 AM featuring all four members on keyboards. The Bangor Symphony Orchestra performed Debussy and Stravinsky during the afternoon of the second day, accompanied by a glider pilot who soared above the audience. During Phish's performance of "Vultures," a couple from Putnam, Connecticut, Terry Moggio and Maggie Loobadeery, exchanged wedding vows on the concert grounds in a ceremony executed by local favorite Stick Treadgood.

75,000 people attended, making the event Phish's largest concert up to that point, and the top-grossing rock concert in the United States in the summer of 1997. Fans camped out onsite in tents, making Limestone the largest city in Maine over the weekend.

== Lemonwheel ==
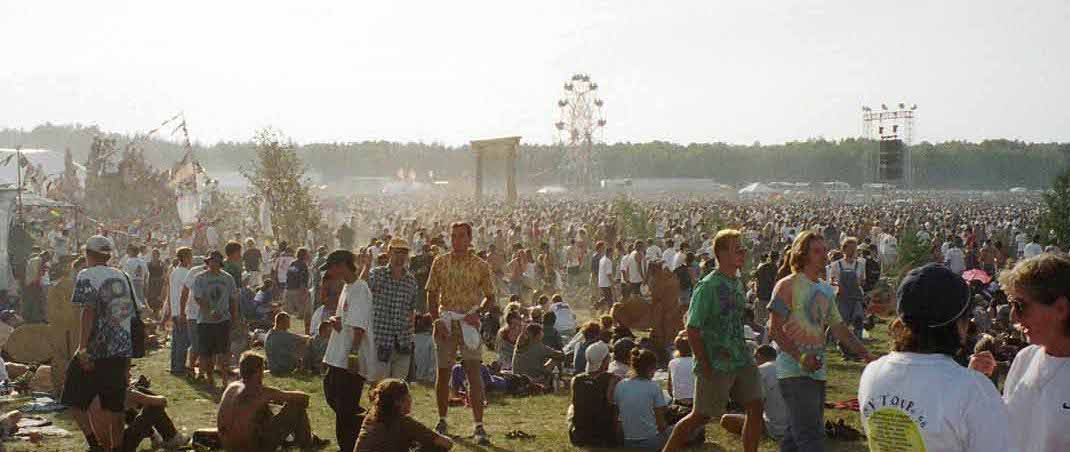
Lemonwheel

Lemonwheel was the third festival hosted by the band, taking place on August 15 and 16, 1998, again at Loring Air Force Base in Limestone, Maine. 60,000 people attended creating a community of fans that, again, made Limestone one of the largest cities in Maine over the weekend.

Phish was the only band to play the main stage, performing seven sets of music over two nights. Several other bands, including Keller Williams and Manic Mule, played in the sidestage. The concert grounds, shaped like a large figure 8, contained several beer gardens, a Ferris wheel, an elephant, jugglers, and stiltsmen. At the festival, the audience made candles throughout the weekend. Saturday night's fourth set included an hour-long ambient jam on a dark stage covered in hundreds of homemade candles. On Sunday, the night ended with the band lighting fuses onstage, burning a path through the stage and activating a large elephant that sprayed a gusher of water into the air from its trunk, and then slowly made its way through the audience to the tune of "Baby Elephant Walk"

== Camp Oswego ==
Camp Oswego was a two-night run hosted by Phish. The event took place on July 17 and 18, 1999, at the Oswego County Airport in Volney, New York, a small rural upstate town. 65,000 people attended. This event, though part of 1999's normal summer tour, is officially considered and was promoted as the band's fourth festival, despite the previously announced festival in Big Cypress, Florida on December 30–31, 1999 and January 1, 2000.

Phish was the only headlining band at the event, performing five sets of music over two nights. Second stage bands included the Del McCoury Band, The Slip and Ozomatli, among others. Fans camped out onsite in tents, creating a community of fans that became one of the largest cities in New York over the weekend.

Band and audience attempted to break the world record for the largest number of people doing the same dance at one time during the song "Meatstick," but the record was not broken (representatives from the Guinness Book of World Records were on hand).

The following weekend, across the state, Woodstock 1999 was making new headlines as a few hundred people, out of the 200,000 people in attendance, rioted and burned the concert grounds. A rumor suggested that New York Governor George Pataki had made mention of the peacefulness of the Phish show as compared to the debacle at Woodstock, but no source has emerged for the oft-repeated quote, and it is now considered to be apocryphal.

== Big Cypress ==
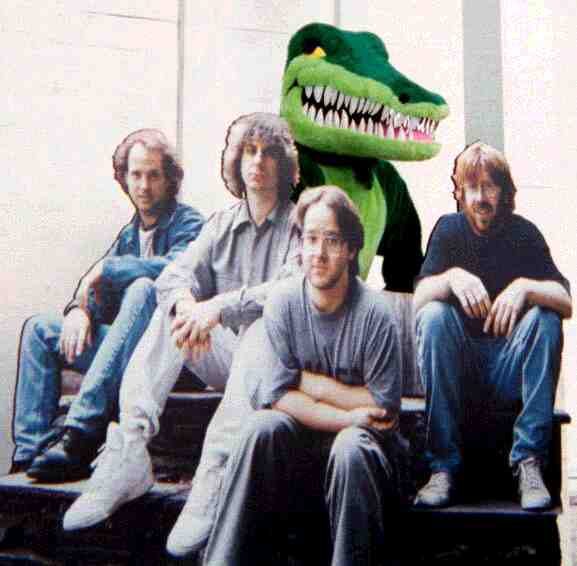
Concert's alligator mascot and a cutout of the band which was featured in the concert's entertainment village

Big Cypress was the fifth and largest of ten weekend-long festivals hosted by the rock band Phish. The event took place on the eve of the millennium – December 30 and 31, 1999, at the Big Cypress Indian Reservation near the Big Cypress National Preserve in southern Florida. 85,000 people attended, making it the largest Millennium Eve concert on earth that night, surpassing shows by Sting, Barbra Streisand, Aerosmith, Billy Joel, Eric Clapton, Rod Stewart, The Eagles, Eminem, Jimmy Buffett, Kiss, Metallica, the Red Hot Chili Peppers, and Elton John.

In a 2000 cover story for Entertainment Weekly, three of the four Phish members declared Big Cypress to be the greatest Phish concert ever. It was also voted as the most popular Phish show ever by fans in the final volume of The Pharmer's Almanac. It was also the longest Phish concert ever, culminating in a seven-and-a-half-hour second set from midnight on New Year's Eve to sunrise New Year's Day. Phish was the only band at the event, performing five sets of music (nearly sixteen hours) over two nights. As fans left the concert area at sunrise, The Beatles' "Here Comes the Sun" played over the PA speakers.

Peter Jennings reported on the huge audience in an episode of ABC World News Tonight. The band's performance of "Heavy Things" was broadcast during ABC's millennium coverage. Following the song, at the band's request, fans chanted the word "cheesecake" instead of cheering to confuse viewers at home (although in the end, the broadcast cut away before the gag could play out). The ABC broadcast was also shown to billions around the world as part of 2000 Today. At the beginning of the band's seven-and-a-half-hour second set, guitarist Trey Anastasio mentioned that the band had portable toilets onstage so they could use the restroom during the marathon set, and a team of security guards lined the stage to prevent band members from "wimping out" and trying to leave the stage. In a later interview with Charlie Rose, Anastasio stated that this was the peak of Phish's career.

== It ==
It was the sixth festival hosted by the rock band Phish. The event took place on August 2 and 3, 2003, at the Loring Air Force Base in Limestone, Maine, just miles from the Canada–U.S. border. 60,000 people attended, resulting in one of the largest Phish concerts ever. This was also their most-played festival venue (see also the Great Went and Lemonwheel). PBS was on hand to make a documentary of the experience.

Phish was the only band at the event, performing seven sets of music over two nights, including a late night ambient set on top of the air traffic control tower at 2:30 AM after the first night's concert. Fans camped onsite in tents, creating a community of Phans that became one of the largest cities in Maine over the weekend.

== Coventry ==
Coventry was the seventh weekend-long festival hosted by the rock band Phish, and was announced to be the final performances ever by the band. The event took place from August 13–15, 2004, at the Newport State Airport in the small town of Coventry, Vermont. An estimated 65,000-68,000 attended.

Phish was the only band at the event, performing six sets of music over two nights that were the band's final live performances, until their 2009 reunion. Fans camped on site in tents, creating a community that became the largest city in Vermont over the weekend.

110,000 people were expected to attend. It was simulcast to thousands more in movie theaters across the United States. The event was also simulcast on XM Satellite Radio. Unfortunately, a week of rain had flooded the concert field to the point where people were turned away, causing gridlock on the highway and roads leading to the site. Rumors circulated that the stage was sinking. The band had made use of a local radio station turning it into "The Bunny" radio with live reports. These reports requested patience from concert goers. However, when Phish Bassist Mike Gordon came on the radio, he announced that the field and venue were in a state of disaster and that no more vehicles would be allowed into the venue. Rumor spread up and down the traffic lines that Phish would play another concert, since less than 20,000 fans had made it into the venue.

Instead of turning away and despite warnings from the National Guard, tens of thousands parked their cars on highway medians, in breakdown lanes, and on the sides of roads. Then they hiked in to the concert venue, some walking as far as 30 miles to the venue. Local residents stepped in and began shuttling fans in and out of the site and to their vehicles. Despite efforts by attendees, trash accumulated from fans stuck along the road. The bill for the subsequent cleanup was sent from the State of Vermont to the Phish organization who picked up the bill in its entirety.

The concert included some songs written at Coventry to glorify members of the team (Bruno and Dicky Scotland). The band gave away their trampolines during "You Enjoy Myself". They broke down crying onstage several times, most notably when Page McConnell choked up during the ballad "Wading in the Velvet Sea". Unable to continue singing, he turned the microphone to the audience, who took over in chorus.

== Festival 8 ==
On June 26, 2009, the band announced a "save the date" for a three-day festival on October 30 - November 1. Phish.com contained an animated map of the United States, and individual states were slowly removed from the map, leaving California. Confirming several rumors, the band announced that "Festival 8" would take place at the Empire Polo Fields in Indio, California. The band played eight sets over the three nights, including a musical costume on Halloween, The Rolling Stones' "Exile On Main Street" and an all acoustic set "at the crack of noon" the following day. Before the acoustic set, the crowd was served free coffee and figure-8-shaped donuts. The festival was filmed in HD 3D and portions of the festival were released in movie theaters across the United States as "Phish 3D." Members of the band Sharon Jones & The Dap-Kings joined the band on Halloween night to perform a number of songs."They were just as nervous as we were. When we stepped up there and did the first two songs—the first one was "Tumbling Dice," and the other one was "Sweet Virginia"—Trey looked up at us after we got through the first song and he gave us a wink," Jones said

Attendance figures for Festival 8 were estimated at 40,000 people.

== Super Ball IX ==
Super Ball IX took place at the Watkins Glen International in Watkins Glen, New York on July 1–3, 2011. It was the first concert to take place at Watkins Glen International since Summer Jam at Watkins Glen in 1973. Seven official sets were played throughout the weekend on the festival's main stage. In addition to the official sets, one additional set featuring ambient, avant-garde music similar to the IT Festival Tower Jam was performed. The set was played late Saturday evening from a partially hidden stage contained in a self-storage building that had been constructed as a piece of the festival's various art installations.

Attendance figures for the festival were estimated at 30,000 people. Local officials were pleased at how smoothly the festival went and deemed the event a success.

== Magnaball ==
On March 18, 2015, Phish announced their tenth festival named Magnaball. The festival was once again held at Watkins Glen International in Watkins Glen, NY, and took place August 21–23, 2015. Seven official sets of music were played over three nights. An additional set was played late Saturday night behind a large drive-in movie screen installed on the back of the race track's bleachers. This set featured ambient music and projections on the screen with live videos of the band superimposed. The event's soundcheck was publicly broadcast.

The festival sold out, with attendance figures estimated at over 40,000 people. A live video stream of all three nights was offered for purchase on Livephish.com.

== Curveball (cancelled) ==
On February 26, 2018, Phish announced their eleventh festival named Curveball. The festival was supposed to be held at Watkins Glen International in Watkins Glen, New York, and take place August 17–19, 2018. However, the festival was canceled on August 16 by the direct order of the New York State Department of Health.

Torrential downpours and flooding throughout the Finger Lakes region of upstate New York led the health department to cancel the festival in order to protect the health and safety of concert goers. A mandatory requirement to boil all water was put in place during the week before and on Thursday, August 16, the water was still deemed too unsafe to drink.

As a result of the cancelation, Curveball ticketholders were given both a full refund and free livestreams of all three nights of Phish's annual run at Dick's Sporting Goods Park in Commerce City, Colorado, which was held two weeks later.

== Mondegreen ==
Mondegreen was the band's first festival since the cancellation of Curveball six years prior. It was held from August 15–18, 2024. It is officially considered the 11th Phish festival, as the band does not count Curveball. A nine year gap between Magnaball and Mondegreen made for the biggest gap between festivals in the band's history.

Mondegreen was named after a term for mishearings of song lyrics. The festival took place in The Woodlands at Dover, Delaware, also the site of Firefly Music Festival. Promotional art was heavily themed after the wooded location, featuring trees and green colors. It also had an alien space theme. The fest ran four days from August 15 to 18, becoming the band's first festival to last this long, although the fourth day was cut short.

Like the festivals before it, Mondegreen boasted a plethora of activities that all people attending could participate in. A Ferris wheel was placed in the middle of the festival ground. A giant cardboard building, dubbed the “City Hall”, was erected, but had to be torn down later due to weather conditions. Aside from the main festival grounds, other artistic ventures could be seen for free such as the “Cerealist Bowl”, a walk-through art exhibit with themes to do with surrealist art and cereal (playing into the festival’s theme of mondegreens), as well as a gigantic moon sphere which was dubbed “The Museum of The Moon”.

Aside from Phish, it featured nightly DJ performances by Flying Mojito Bros, Made Of Oak, and Questlove, as well as live stand-up comedy with Dave Hill, Rory Scovel, Jordan Jensen, and Gianmarco Soresi. The grounds also contained many art installations contributed by various outside artists. Phish planned to play two sets daily at the festival, making for eight in total. On the final day, severe weather during the originally scheduled set times forced the band to take the stage during the day. They played a single set show during this day. On the second night, Phish performed a "secret set" which was dubbed the "Mondegreen Ambient Jam" by LivePhish. Of note is that this particular secret set broke the tradition of full secrecy upheld by previous ones, as the band publicly revealed the night they would play it.
