= The WaterWheel Foundation =

Charitable organization for the band Phish

The WaterWheel Foundation, Inc.
- Founded: April 22, 1997; 29 years ago
- Tax ID no.: 13-3948773
- Legal status: 501(c)(3) private foundation
- President: Ernest Anastasio III
- Treasurer: Michael Gordon
- Secretary: Page McConnell
- Vice President: Jonathan Fishman
- Revenue: $1,001,647 (2014)
- Expenses: $497,545 (2014)
- Website: phish.com/waterwheel/

The WaterWheel Foundation is a non-profit organization created by the rock band Phish on April 22, 1997, to oversee their charitable activities. Initially, the Foundation included The Touring Division, The Giving Program, and the Lake Champlain Initiative.

The Lake Champlain Initiative continues to donate proceeds from the sale of Ben and Jerry's Phish Food ice cream to support the environmental well-being of Lake Champlain and its watershed.

== Lake Champlain Initiative ==
Lake Champlain, a sizeable lake on the Vermont/New York border, is currently plagued by several major problems: an overabundance of phosphorus from sewage, agricultural/urban run-off, toxic waste, and invasions of non-native species. Over half of the lake is considered to be too polluted to be of full use, and yet sees over $1 billion in tourism each year.

Fellow Vermonters Ben & Jerry's approached the band in 1995 regarding a flavor called Phish Food; Phish decided that they would donate all royalties to help Lake Champlain. WaterWheel has given away over $1 million to 29 organizations working on issues affecting Lake Champlain covering a wide variety of issues: land conservation, environmental advocacy, activism, education, and so forth.

Phish drummer Jon Fishman said the band was inspired to found the Waterwheel Foundation by actor Paul Newman, who founded the Newman's Own food company and donated all profit from their products to charity.

== Touring Division ==
The primary mission of WaterWheel's Touring Division is dedicated to raising funds for one selected non-profit in each community to which Phish toured. The proceeds from the sale of WaterWheel merchandise is donated directly to the organization table of the charity at that particular show. WaterWheel has donated over $400,000 to more than 189 organizations.

During the band's hiatus (10/00 - 12/02), the Touring Division continued to tour with Trey Anastasio side-projects (Anastasio's first project, Oysterhead). Original Touring Division directors Mike Hayes and Henry Schwab left the organization at the commencement of the hiatus. The division's activities were carried forward by Chris Prang & Matt Beck through the hiatus and into Phish's first two years back on the road.

== Local giving ==
Comprising the organizations in which a band member takes a personal interest, Local Giving is concentrated on Vermont-based non-profits. Past recipients have included the Vermont Youth Orchestra, Women's Rape Crisis Center, Firehouse Center for the Visual Arts, The Flynn Center for the Performing Arts, and Vermont Public Television.
