= Crimes of the Mind =

Crimes Of the Mind

Studio album by The Dude of Life and Phish
- Released: October 25, 1994
- Recorded: 1991
- Length: 48:32
- Label: Elektra
- Producer: The Dude of Life; Phish; Dan Archer

The Dude of Life and Phish chronology
Crimes Of the Mind (1994)	Under The Sound Umbrella (1999)

Professional ratings
Review scores
Source	Rating
AllMusic	2/5 stars
Entertainment Weekly	B−
MusicHound Rock: The Essential Album Guide	1/5 stars

Crimes of the Mind is the debut album from The Dude of Life, a childhood friend of Phish leader Trey Anastasio and a lyrical contributor to many of Phish's early songs. Phish is the backing band for the entire album.

The album was recorded in 1991 but wasn't released until 1994, following Phish's surge in popularity. The Dude of Life performed several of the songs in a live setting with Phish on a number of occasions.

The main riff of Phish's "Chalk Dust Torture" was first used in the song "Self."

== Critical reception ==
AllMusic called the album a "loopy, stoned excursion that winds through Dead-style rock and hippie folk-rock." Entertainment Weekly deemed it "inconsequential silliness," writing that "the nice part is that the Dude’s ditties force Phish to keep its penchant for kitchen-sink jamming in check." Trouser Press wrote that "the music is a bit tighter than the [Phish]’s — but only a bit."

== Track listing ==
1. "Dahlia" – 03:15
2. "Family Picture" – 04:22
3. "Self" – 04:01
4. "Crimes of the Mind" – 04:28
5. "Bitchin' Again" – 03:36
6. "TV Show" – 04:41
7. "Trials and Tribulations" – 05:07
8. "Lucy in the Subway" – 04:59
9. "Ordinary Day" – 03:52
10. "Revolution's Over" – 04:41
11. "King of Nothing" – 05:30

== Personnel ==
The Dude of Life – vocals

Phish

- Trey Anastasio – guitars, vocals
- Page McConnell – keyboards, vocals
- Mike Gordon – bass, vocals
- Jon Fishman – drums, vocals
