= David Welker =

American painter and poster artist (born 1964)

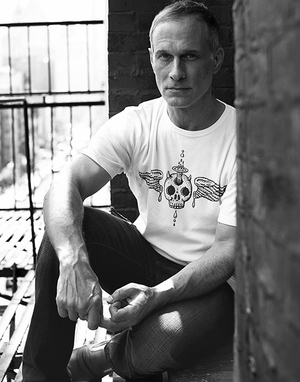
- David Welker in NYC
- Born: David Welker; July 30, 1964 (age 61); Poughkeepsie, New York, U.S.
- Education: Syracuse University
- Known for: Painter
- Notable work: Rift; Mound; The Levitator; Rising Tides; Troubadours
- Website: www.welkerstudios.com

David Welker is an American painter and poster artist known for his elaborate, narrative imagery and mastery of multiple styles. His poster art for bands like Phish, Pearl Jam, Primus, The Black Keys, and the Grateful Dead has brought him international acclaim. His artwork on the cover of the 1993 studio album, Rift, by the American rock band Phish was listed as one of the top ten album covers of all time by Relix magazine in 2007.

His visual aesthetic is an amalgam of early 20th Century Surrealism, The Ashcan School, West Coast Surf Culture and Underground Comix.

== Early life ==
Welker was born in Poughkeepsie, New York, on July 30, 1964. His family moved to Pleasantville, New York, an eclectic and culturally rich suburb of New York City in 1967 where he ultimately began to develop a keen interest in art and music that would shape the rest of his life’s work. In 1982, he enrolled at Syracuse University to study painting, drawing, and illustration and graduated in 1986. Welker credits the work of artists Jerome Witkin, Max Ernst, George Bellows, Thomas Hart Benton, and Robert Crumb as major influences in his formative years.

== Career ==
After graduating from Syracuse University, Welker began painting large-scale works to build a gallery portfolio. In 1988, Welker moved to Boston, Massachusetts, where he continued to develop large scale paintings and drawings. It was in Boston at the request of a close friend that he first saw the band Phish at the Paradise Club in 1989. An event that would ultimately have a huge effect on his art career. When Welker moved to Manhattan two years later, he saw Phish again on March 14, 1992 at the Roseland Ballroom. This show resonated with him so much that he decided to reach out to Phish and share his artwork in hopes of a collaboration -- a decision that would forever change the course of Welker’s career.

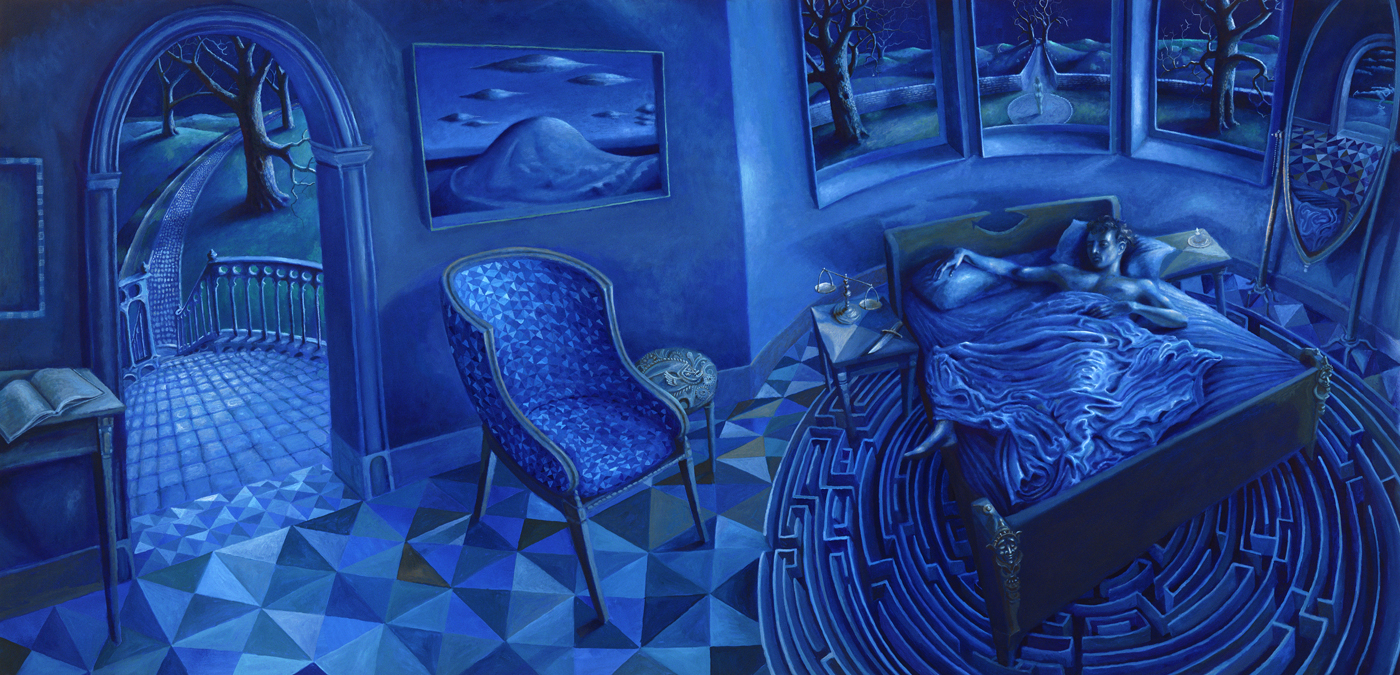
RIFT - 1992 oil on paper

=== Rift ===
In the autumn of 1992, after corresponding via mail with the band Phish, he was contacted by Trey Anastasio to begin creating artwork for their studio album Rift. Welker spent the next few weeks working closely with guitarist Anastasio, bassist Mike Gordon and Elektra Records to develop an ambitious visual interpretation of the music and lyrics, depicting each song on the album. The final artwork was a 3’x6’ oil painting that became the album cover art. The original painting was subsequently purchased by Phish and hangs in their headquarters in Burlington, Vermont. This commission began a long working relationship with Phish that has included numerous poster projects over the course of two decades as well as album art for their 1996 studio album Billy Breathes and numerous side projects for Trey Anastasio and Mike Gordon.

Welker cites this collaboration as a major breakthrough in his early career that helped guide him into the field of concert poster art and ultimately connected his name and his art to a wide and varied audience.

=== Present work ===
From 2015 forward, Welker has focused primarily on gallery shows. His eclectic style mixes elements of realism with abstraction and encoded typography to create a dreamlike experience for viewers.

His 2015 retrospective at Hoerle Guggenheim in New York’s Chelsea Art District opened to large audiences and critical acclaim. The nine week show featured over 70 pieces of original work.

Welker has also displayed at Spoke Art San Francisco with sold out shows in 2017 and 2018 as well as Art Basel from 2016-2018.

In the 2019 showing with Hashimoto Contemporary, Welker brought a sold out show to the prestigious Art on Paper fair at Pier 36 in New York City.

In Brooklyn, New York, Welker works closely with pop culture kingpins Bottleneck Gallery who house a permanent showroom for his work in the Williamsburg Waterfront District and handle the majority of his print releases.

=== Commercial work ===
Welker worked with B&A Reps from 2013-2016 producing some memorable campaigns for New Castle Werewolf Ale and Black Magic Rum as well as editorial work for a Mojo Magazine feature article on Beck’s album Morning Phase.

During this time period his work was featured in the Society of Illustrators 57th Annual Museum show with work commissioned by the Jerry Garcia Estate and the rock band Widespread Panic, as well as the prestigious Communication Arts Annual in 2014 featuring a project for The Black Keys.

== Personal life ==
Welker lives and works in downtown Manhattan and has one son named Milo.
