= The Dude of Life =

American musician (born 1964 or 1965)

- Born: Steve Pollak; 1964 or 1965 (age 60–61)

Steve Pollak (born 1964 or 1965 (age 60–61)), best known by his stage name The Dude of Life, is a musician and lyricist.

== Early life ==
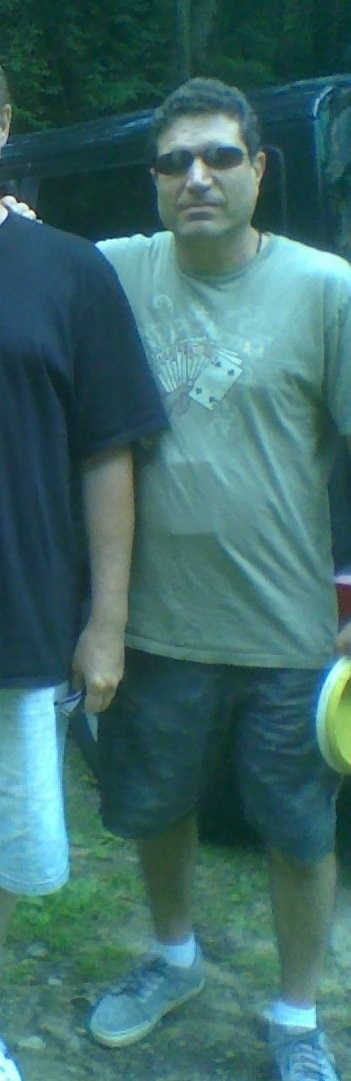
The Dude of Life, after a round of disc golf.

Steve Pollak is from White Plains, New York. He attended high school in the early 1980s. He earned the alias Dude of Life in high school while playing with the teenage band Space Antelope, along with fellow students Dudley Taft and Trey Anastasio. While going to boarding school at Taft in Watertown, Connecticut, he got the name from classmates when he appeared in a friend's dorm with orange goggles and draped in a tapestry, and saying otherworldly things. In his band Space Antelope, they wrote their own music and covered Grateful Dead songs.

The Dude of Life and Trey Anastasio continued jamming together at the University of Vermont. Pollak attended SUNY Purchase after one semester at the University of Vermont, and majored in literature. He afterwards worked a series of odd jobs, such as a salesman.

== Phish ==
He has co-written numerous Phish songs, including "Suzy Greenberg", "Run like an Antelope", "Fluffhead", "Sanity", "Dinner and a Movie", "Crimes of the Mind", and "Slave to the Traffic Light".

"Fluffhead" was inspired by Pollak's older brother, who died of cancer.

Recent songs he co-wrote with Anastasio include "Show of Life", "Architect", and "Dr. Gabel."

The Dude of Life has appeared on stage at Phish concerts numerous times. During appearances at Phish shows as well as his own shows, he threw out rubber animals with Sharpie inscriptions by him as well as Phish band members and associates.

In 2013, he released an original song he co-wrote with Anastasio called "Edie's Dream." It was inspired by Edie Sedgwick.

== Solo career ==
The Dude of Life has released two studio albums: Crimes of the Mind (recorded in 1991), which featured Phish as his backing band, and the 1999 release Under the Sound Umbrella with a different backing band, featuring appearances by Trey Anastasio, Mike Gordon and Jon Fishman.

In February 1994 he played at the Paradise in Boston, Massachusetts, with appearances by members of Phish.

For Under the Sound Umbrella, backing band was the Great Red Shark, which included Cliff Mays on guitar, Mark Thors on keyboard, Paul Gassman on bass, and Jim Weingast on drums.

Entertainment Weekly gave Crimes of the Mind a review, and said it was "inconsequential silliness". It gave it a score of B−.

In writing about Under the Sound Umbrella, William Ruhlmann at Allmusic said that it has "quirky lyrics that border on novelties" with a style reminiscent of the Beatles and David Bowie.

The "Under the Sound Umbrella" tour found The Dude of Life performing at venues like The Comfort Zone in Toronto, Ontario, MusikFest in Bethlehem, Pennsylvania, and Alexanders in New Jerusalem, Pennsylvania, where he performed alongside bands Captain Zig, Emergent Evolution, and Bohemian Sunrise.

In 2015, he and Charles de Saint Phalle collaborated on original music and sound effects for Lightscapes at Van Cortlandt Manor in Croton-on-Hudson, an installation with sculpture, light and music. In recent years, he has performed with Fluid Druids and put together a new version of his solo band. The Dude of Life Band, with Charles de Saint Phalle on bass, Fred Scholl on lead guitar, Doug Schneider on drums and Jon "Bevo" Leibowitz of God Street Wine on keyboard, toured nationally in 2021, and has announced a spring tour of the northeast in 2022, including stops at Lark Hall in Albany, NY, Nectar's in Burlington, VT and City Winery in New York, NY.

== Personal ==
He lives in Croton-on-Hudson with his wife Leslie. As of 2008, Steve Pollak was teaching elementary school in the Bronx, New York. He has three children.

== Discography ==
- Crimes Of the Mind (with Phish) (1994 - recorded in 1991)
- Under The Sound Umbrella (1999)
