= Jeff Holdsworth =

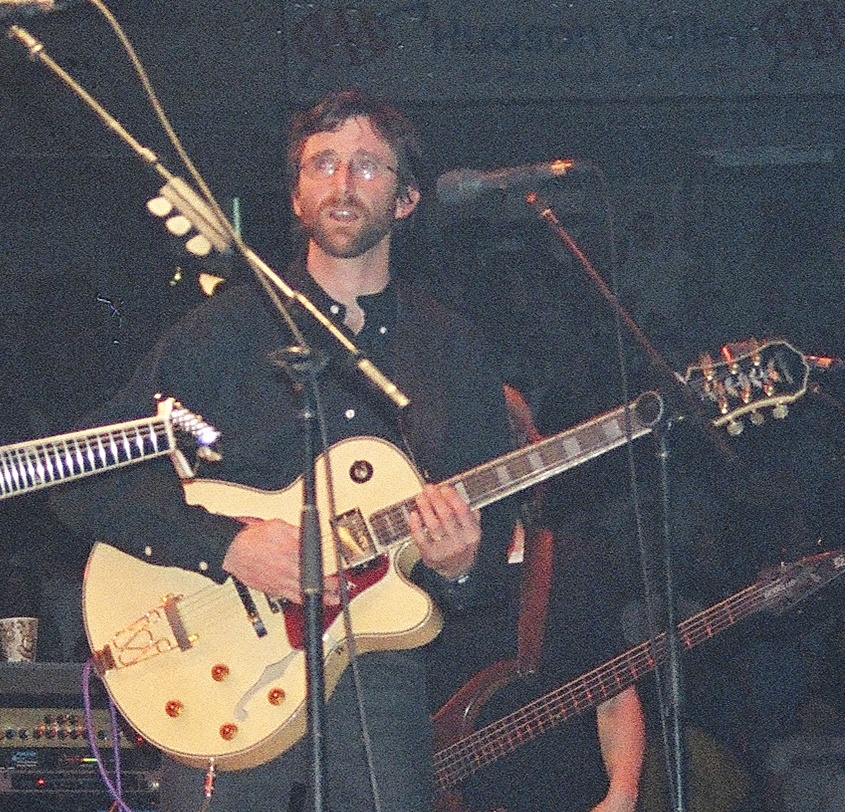
- Holdsworth, in Albany, 2003

Background information
- Born: November 14, 1963 (age 61)
- Origin: Bryn Mawr, Pennsylvania, U.S.
- Genres: Psychedelic rock; rock; jam rock; acoustic rock
- Occupations: Musician; songwriter
- Instruments: Vocals; guitar
- Years active: 1983–1986; 2003
- Formerly of: Phish

Jeff Holdsworth (Born November 14, 1963) is a musician who was a founding member of the rock band Phish. Founded at the Redstone campus dormitories of the University of Vermont (UVM) in the fall of 1983, the band originally featured Holdsworth and Trey Anastasio sharing lead vocal and guitar duties, Jon Fishman on drums, and Mike Gordon on bass guitar. Holdsworth left the band in 1986 after graduating from UVM to pursue a career in electrical engineering, shortly before the band recorded their debut self-produced album, The White Tape, though he had played on some of the demo recordings (done in a dorm room) that would later be re-recorded for that album. His songs "Possum" and "Camel Walk" continue to be Phish live show favorites.

After a transformative journey to Alaska in the summer of 1986, Holdsworth settled in the Philadelphia area and decided to pursue purely acoustic music within a spiritual context.

On December 1, 2003, at the Pepsi Arena in Albany, New York, one night before the band's 20th Anniversary concert, Holdsworth appeared onstage with Phish for the first time in 17 years, performing several of his originals and a few covers. During his sit in, he performed on both the Phish originals the band continues to perform, "Camel Walk" and "Possum."
