= Phish =

American rock band

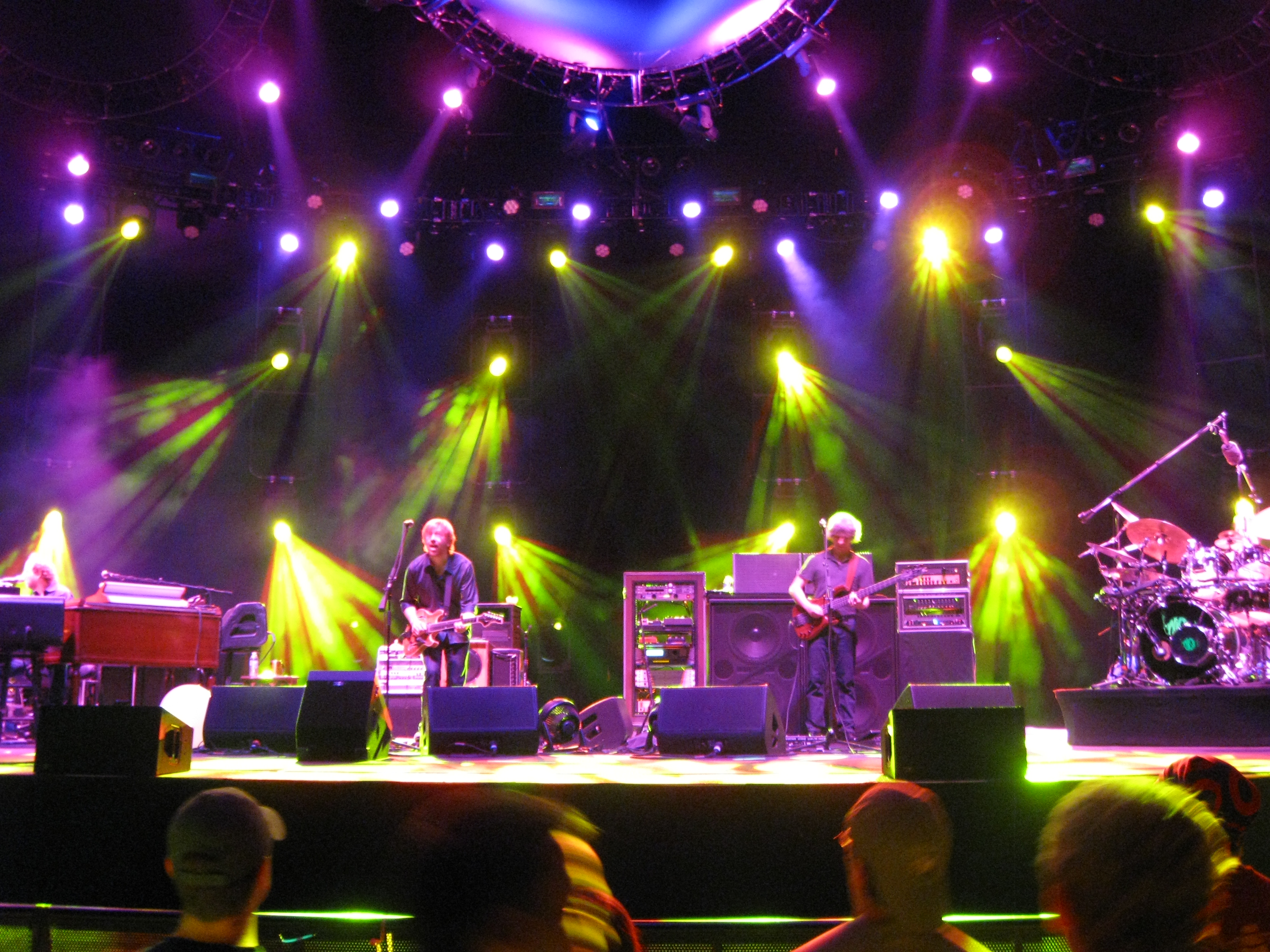
- Phish performing in 2010. Left to right: Page McConnell, Trey Anastasio, Mike Gordon, Jon Fishman.

Background information
- Origin: Burlington, Vermont, U.S.
- Genres: Rock; psychedelic rock; jam band; progressive rock; experimental rock; alternative rock; jazz fusion; funk rock
- Works: Discography; songs; tours
- Years active: 1983–2000; 2002–2004; 2008–present
- Labels: Elektra; Rhino/WMG; JEMP; MapleMusic
- Spinoffs: Surrender to the Air; Trey Anastasio Band; Oysterhead; Vida Blue; Pork Tornado; SerialPod
- Members: Trey Anastasio; Jon Fishman; Mike Gordon; Page McConnell
- Past members: Jeff Holdsworth
- Website: phish.com

Phish is an American rock band formed in Burlington, Vermont, in 1983. The band consists of guitarist Trey Anastasio, bassist Mike Gordon, drummer Jon Fishman, and keyboardist Page McConnell. All four members perform vocals, with Anastasio being the primary lead vocalist. The band is known for their musical improvisation and jams during their concert performances and for their devoted fan following.

The band was formed by Anastasio, Gordon, Fishman and guitarist Jeff Holdsworth, who were joined by McConnell in 1985. Holdsworth left the band in 1986, and the lineup has remained stable since. Most of the band's songs are co-written by Anastasio and lyricist Tom Marshall. Phish began to perform outside of New England in the late 1980s and experienced a rise in popularity in the mid-1990s. In October 2000, the band began a two-year hiatus that ended in December 2002, and they disbanded again in August 2004. Phish reunited officially in October 2008 for subsequent reunion shows in March 2009 and since then have resumed performing regularly. All four members pursued solo careers or performed with side-projects and these projects have continued after the band reunited.

Phish's music blends elements of a wide variety of genres including funk, reggae, progressive rock, psychedelic rock, folk, country, jazz, blues, bluegrass, electronic music, and pop. The band is part of a movement of improvisational rock groups, inspired by the format of the Grateful Dead's live performances and colloquially known as "jam bands", that gained considerable popularity as touring concert acts in the 1990s. Phish has developed a large and dedicated following by word of mouth and the exchange of live recordings. As of 2020, the band had sold more than 8 million albums and DVDs in the United States.

Phish were signed to major label Elektra Records from 1991 to 2005, when the band formed their own independent label, JEMP Records, to release archival CD and DVD sets.

== History ==
=== Formation, The White Tape and The Man Who Stepped into Yesterday: 1983–1988 ===
Phish was formed at the University of Vermont (UVM) in 1983 by guitarists Trey Anastasio and Jeff Holdsworth, bassist Mike Gordon, and drummer Jon Fishman. Anastasio and Fishman had met that October, after Anastasio overheard Fishman playing drums in his dormitory room, and asked if he and Holdsworth could jam with him. Gordon met the trio shortly thereafter, having answered a want-ad for a bass guitarist that Anastasio had posted around the university.

The new group performed their first concert at Harris Millis Cafeteria at the University of Vermont on December 2, 1983, where they played a set of classic rock covers, including two songs by the Grateful Dead. The band performed one more concert in 1983, and then did not perform again for nearly a year, stemming from Anastasio's suspension from the university following a prank he had pulled with a friend.

Anastasio returned to his hometown of Princeton, New Jersey following the prank, and reconnected with his childhood friend Tom Marshall; The duo began a songwriting collaboration and recorded material that would appear on the Bivouac Jaun demo tape. Marshall and Anastasio have subsequently composed the majority of Phish's original songs throughout their career. Anastasio returned to Burlington in late 1984, and resumed performing with Gordon, Holdsworth and Fishman. The quartet named themselves Phish in October 1984, shortly before they performed their first concert together following Anastasio's return to UVM. Anastasio designed the band's logo, which featured the group's name inside a stylized fish. The band's members have given several different origins for the name Phish. In Parke Puterbaugh's 2009 book Phish: The Biography, the origin is given as a variation on phshhhh, the sound of a brush on a snare drum. In the 2004 official documentary Specimens of Beauty, Anastasio said the band was also named after Fishman, whose nickname is "Fish." In a 1996 interview, Fishman denied that the band was named after him, and said the inspiration behind the name was the sound of an airplane taking off.

In late 1984, Phish began to play regularly at Nectar's bar and restaurant in downtown Burlington, and performed dozens of concerts across multiple residencies through March 1989. The band's 1992 album A Picture of Nectar was named in honor of the bar's owner, Nectar Rorris, and its cover features his face superimposed onto an orange.

The band would collaborate with percussionist Marc Daubert, a friend of Anastasio's, in the fall of 1984. Daubert ceased performing with the band in early 1985. Keyboardist Page McConnell met Phish in early 1985, when he arranged for them to play a spring concert at Goddard College, the small university he attended in Plainfield, Vermont. He began performing with the band as a guest shortly thereafter, and made his live debut during the third set of their May 3, 1985, concert at UVM's Redstone Campus. In the summer of 1985, Phish went on a short hiatus while Anastasio and Fishman vacationed in Europe; during this time, McConnell offered to join the band permanently, and moved to Burlington to learn their repertoire from Gordon. McConnell officially joined Phish as a full-time band member in September 1985.

Phish performed with a five-piece lineup for about six months after McConnell joined, a period which ended when Holdsworth quit the group in March 1986 following a religious conversion. Anastasio and Fishman relocated in mid-1986 to Goddard College after a recommendation from McConnell. Phish distributed at least six experimental self-titled cassettes during this era, including The White Tape.

While based at Goddard College, Phish began to collaborate with fellow students Richard "Nancy" Wright and Jim Pollock. Pollock and Wright were musical collaborators who made experimental recordings on multi-track cassettes, and had been introduced to Phish through McConnell, who co-hosted a radio program on WGDR with Pollock. Phish adopted a number of Nancy's songs into their own set, including "Halley's Comet", "I Didn't Know", and "Dear Mrs. Reagan", the latter song being written by Nancy and Pollock. In his book Heads: A Biography of Psychedelic America, music journalist Jesse Jarnow observed that Wright and his music were highly influential to Phish's early style and experimental sound. Wright amicably ended his association with Phish in 1989, but Pollock has continued to collaborate with Phish over the years, designing some of their album covers and concert posters.

By 1985, the group had encountered Burlington luthier Paul Languedoc, who would eventually design custom instruments for Anastasio and Gordon. In October 1986, he began working as their sound engineer. Since then, Languedoc has built exclusively for the two, and his designs and traditional wood choices have given Phish a unique instrumental identity.

As his senior project for Goddard College, Anastasio penned The Man Who Stepped into Yesterday, a nine-song progressive rock concept album that would become Phish's second studio experiment. Recorded between 1987 and 1988, it was submitted in July of that year, accompanied by a written thesis. The song cycle that developed from the project – known as Gamehendge – grew to include an additional eight songs. The band performed the suite in concert on six occasions: in 1988, 1991, 1993, twice in 1994, and in 2023, without replicating the song list. The Man Who Stepped into Yesterday has never received an official release, but a bootleg tape has circulated for decades, and songs such as "Wilson" and "The Lizards" remain concert staples for the band.

Beginning in the spring of 1988, members of the band began practicing in earnest, sometimes locking themselves in a room and jamming for hours on end. One such jam took place at Anastasio's apartment, with a second at Paul Languedoc's house in August 1989. They called these jam sessions "Oh Kee Pa Ceremonies", a reference to the film A Man Called Horse. In July 1988, the band performed their first concerts outside of the northeastern United States, when they embarked on a seven-date tour in Colorado. These shows are excerpted on their 2006 live compilation Colorado '88.

=== Junta, Lawn Boy, and A Picture of Nectar: 1989–1992 ===
On January 26, 1989, Phish played the Paradise Rock Club in Boston; the owners of the club had never heard of Phish and refused to book them, so the band rented the club for the night. The show sold out due to the caravan of fans that had traveled to see the band. The concert was Phish's breakthrough on the northeastern regional music circuit, and the band began to book concerts at other large rock clubs, theaters, and small auditoriums throughout the area, such as the Somerville Theatre, Worcester Memorial Auditorium and Wetlands Preserve. That spring, the band self-released their debut full-length studio album, Junta, and sold copies on cassette tape at their concerts. The album includes a studio recording of the epic "You Enjoy Myself", which is considered to be the band's signature song. Later in 1989, the band hired Chris Kuroda as their lighting director. Kuroda subsequently became well known for his artistic light shows at the group's concerts. A profile on Phish appeared in the October 1989 issue of the Deadhead magazine Relix, which marked the first time the band had been covered in a major national music periodical.

By late 1990, Phish's concerts were becoming more and more intricate, often making a consistent effort to involve the audience in the performance. In a special "secret language", the audience would react in a certain manner based on a particular musical cue from the band. For instance, if Anastasio "teased" a motif from The Simpsons theme song, the audience would yell, "D'oh!" in imitation of Homer Simpson. In 1992, Phish introduced a collaboration between audience and band called the "Big Ball Jam" in which each band member would throw a large beach ball into the audience and play a note each time his ball was hit. In so doing, the audience was helping to create an original composition. On occasion, performances of "You Enjoy Myself" and "Mike's Song" involved Gordon and Anastasio performing synchronized maneuvers and jumping on mini-trampolines while simultaneously playing their instruments. Fishman would also regularly step out from behind his drum kit during concerts to sing cover songs, which were often punctuated by him playing an Electrolux vacuum cleaner like an instrument. The band released their second album, Lawn Boy, in September 1990 on Absolute A Go Go, a small independent label that had a distribution deal with the larger Rough Trade Records. The album had been recorded the previous year, after the band had won studio time at engineer Dan Archer's Archer Studios when they came in first place at an April 1989 Battle of the Bands competition in Burlington.

Aware of the band's growing popularity, Elektra Records signed Phish in 1991 after they were recommended to the record label by A&R representative Sue Drew. In the summer of 1991, the band embarked on a 14-date tour of the eastern United States accompanied by a three-piece horn section dubbed the Giant Country Horns. In August of that year, Phish played an outdoor concert at their friend Amy Skelton's horse farm in Auburn, Maine that acted as a prototype for their later all-day festival events. Phish, along with Bob Dylan, the Grateful Dead, and the Beatles, was one of the first bands to have a Usenet newsgroup, rec.music.phish, which launched in 1992.

In 1992, the band released their third studio album, A Picture of Nectar, their first release for the major label Elektra. Subsequently, the label also reissued the band's first two albums. Later in 1992, Phish participated in the first annual H.O.R.D.E. festival, which provided them with their first national tour of major amphitheaters. The lineup, among others, included Phish, Blues Traveler, the Spin Doctors, and Widespread Panic. That summer, the band toured Europe with the Violent Femmes and later toured Europe and the US with Santana. Throughout the latter tour, Carlos Santana regularly invited some or all of the members of Phish to jam with his band during their headlining performances. The band ended 1992 with a New Year's Eve performance at the Matthews Arena in Boston, Massachusetts, a performance that was simulcast throughout the Boston area by radio station WBCN. The concert was filled with several new "secret language" cues they had taught their audience to deliberately confuse radio listeners.

=== Rift, Hoist, and A Live One: 1993–1995 ===
Phish began headlining major amphitheaters in the summer of 1993. That year, the group released their fourth album, Rift, a concept album which featured a cover painted by David Welker that referenced almost all of the songs on the record. The album was the band's first to appear on the Billboard 200 album chart, debuting at No. 51 in February 1993.

In March 1994, the band released their fifth studio album Hoist. The album featured an array of guest performers, including country singer Alison Krauss, banjoist Béla Fleck, former Sly & The Family Stone member Rose Stone, actor and trombonist Jonathan Frakes, and the horn section of R&B group Tower of Power. To promote the album, Gordon directed the band's only official music video, for its first single "Down with Disease". "Down with Disease" became a minor hit on rock radio in the United States, and was the band's first song to appear on a Billboard music chart when it peaked at No. 33 on the magazine's Hot Mainstream Rock Tracks chart that summer. To further promote Hoist, the band released an experimental short-subject documentary called Tracking, also directed by Gordon, which depicted the recording sessions for the album.

Foreshadowing their future tradition of festivals, Phish coupled camping with their 1994 summer tour finale at Sugarbush North in Warren, Vermont, that show eventually being released as Live Phish Volume 2. On Halloween of that year, the group promised to don a fan-selected "musical costume" by playing an entire album from another band. After an extensive mail-based poll, Phish performed the Beatles' White Album as the second of their three sets at the Glens Falls Civic Center in upstate New York. The "musical costume" concept subsequently became a recurring part of Phish's fall tours, with the band playing a different album whenever they had a concert scheduled for Halloween night.

In October 1994, Crimes of the Mind, the debut album by Anastasio's friend and collaborator Steve "The Dude of Life" Pollak, was released by Elektra Records; The album, which had been recorded in 1991, was billed to "The Dude of Life and Phish" and features all four members of Phish acting as Pollak's backing band.

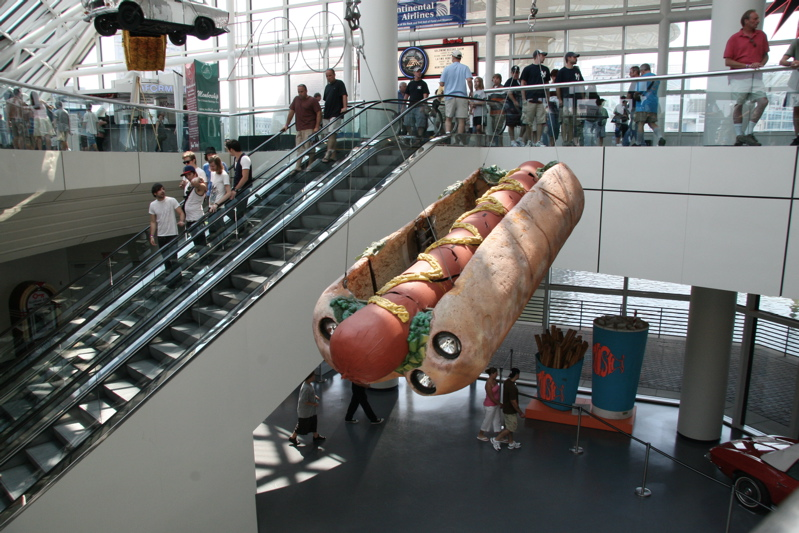
Phish's 1994 New Year's Eve hot dog float, hanging in the lobby of the Rock and Roll Hall of Fame in Cleveland, Ohio

On December 30, 1994, the band made their first appearance on national network television when they performed "Chalk Dust Torture" on Late Night with David Letterman. The band would go on to appear on the program seven more times before David Letterman's retirement as host in 2015. For their 1994 New Years Run, Phish played the Civic Centers in Philadelphia and Providence as well as sold-out shows at Madison Square Garden and Boston Garden, which marked their debut performances at both venues. For the December 31 show at the Boston Garden, the band rode around the arena in a float shaped like a hot dog. The stunt was reprised at their 1999 New Year's Eve concert before the hot dog was donated to the Rock and Roll Hall of Fame. At the end of 1994, Phish appeared on Pollstar's list of the highest grossing concert tours in the United States for the first time, as the 32nd highest grossing act, with $10.3 million in ticket sales.

Following the death of Grateful Dead guitarist Jerry Garcia in the summer of 1995 and the appearance of "Down with Disease" on Beavis and Butt-Head, the band experienced a surge in the growth of their fan base and an increased awareness in popular culture. In their tradition of playing a well-known album by another band for Halloween, Phish contracted a full horn section for their performance of The Who's Quadrophenia in 1995.

Phish's first live album, A Live One, was released during the summer of 1995 and featured selections from various concerts from their 1994 winter tour. The album charted at number 18 on the Billboard 200 album chart, and was reported to have sold around 50,000 copies in its first week on sale. A Live One became Phish's first RIAA-certified gold album in November 1995. In 1997, A Live One became the band's first Platinum album, certified for sales of 1 million copies in the United States, and remains their best selling album to date.

Phish ended 1995 with their first New Year's Eve concert at Madison Square Garden. The concert was released in its entirety on the live album Phish: New Year's Eve 1995 – Live at Madison Square Garden in 2005.

=== Billy Breathes, The Story of the Ghost, and The Siket Disc: 1996–1999 ===
In early 1996, Anastasio and Fishman formed a free jazz side-project called Surrender to the Air, inspired by the music of Sun Ra, which also featured Marshall Allen, Michael Ray, John Medeski, Oteil Burbridge, Kofi Burbridge, and Marc Ribot, among other musicians. The group's only album, Surrender to the Air, was released in March.

Following an appearance at the New Orleans Jazz & Heritage Festival in April 1996, Phish spent the summer of that year opening for Santana on their European tour. In August 1996, the band held their first festival, The Clifford Ball, at the decommissioned Plattsburgh Air Force Base on the New York side of Lake Champlain. The festival attracted 70,000 attendees, making it both Phish's biggest concert crowd to that point and the largest single concert by attendance in the United States in 1996. Phish recorded their sixth album Billy Breathes in the winter and spring of 1996, and the album was issued in October of that year. The album's first single, "Free", peaked at No. 24 on the Billboard Hot Modern Rock Tracks chart and No. 11 on the Mainstream Rock Tracks chart, and was their most successful song on both charts.

By 1997, Phish's concert improvisational ventures were developing into a new funk-inspired long form jamming style. Vermont-based ice cream conglomerate Ben & Jerry's launched "Phish Food" that year. The band officially licensed their name for use with the product, the only time they have ever allowed a third-party company to do so, and were directly involved with the creation of the flavor. Proceeds from the flavor are donated to the band's non-profit charity The WaterWheel Foundation, which raises funds for the preservation of Vermont's Lake Champlain. On August 8, 1997, Phish webcast one of their concerts live over the internet for the first time.

On August 16 and 17, 1997, Phish held their second festival, The Great Went, over two days at the Loring Air Force Base in Limestone, Maine, near the Canada–United States border. In October 1997, the band released their second live album Slip Stitch and Pass, which featured selections from their March 1997 concert at the Markthalle Hamburg in Hamburg, Germany.

Following the Great Went, the band embarked on a fall tour that was dubbed by fans as the "Phish Destroys America" tour after a 1970s kung fu-inspired poster for the opening date in Las Vegas. The 21-date tour is considered one of the group's most popular and acclaimed tours, and several concerts were later officially released on live album sets such as Live Phish Volume 11 in 2002. Phish ended 1997 as one of the ten highest grossing concert acts in the United States that year.

In April 1998, the band embarked on the Island Tour – a four night tour with two shows at the Nassau Coliseum in Uniondale, New York on Long Island and another two at the Providence Civic Center in Providence, Rhode Island. The four concerts are highly regarded by fans due to the band's exploration of a jazz-funk musical style they had been playing for the previous year, which Anastasio dubbed "cowfunk". The band performed the tour in the middle of studio sessions for their seventh album, and were inspired by the quality of their performances to further incorporate the cowfunk style into subsequent sessions. The resulting album, The Story of the Ghost, was released in October 1998. The album's first single "Birds of a Feather", which had been premiered on the Island Tour, became a No. 14 hit on Billboard's Adult Alternative Songs chart. To promote The Story of the Ghost, Phish performed several songs from the album on the public television music show Sessions at West 54th in October 1998, and were interviewed for the program by its host David Byrne of Talking Heads.

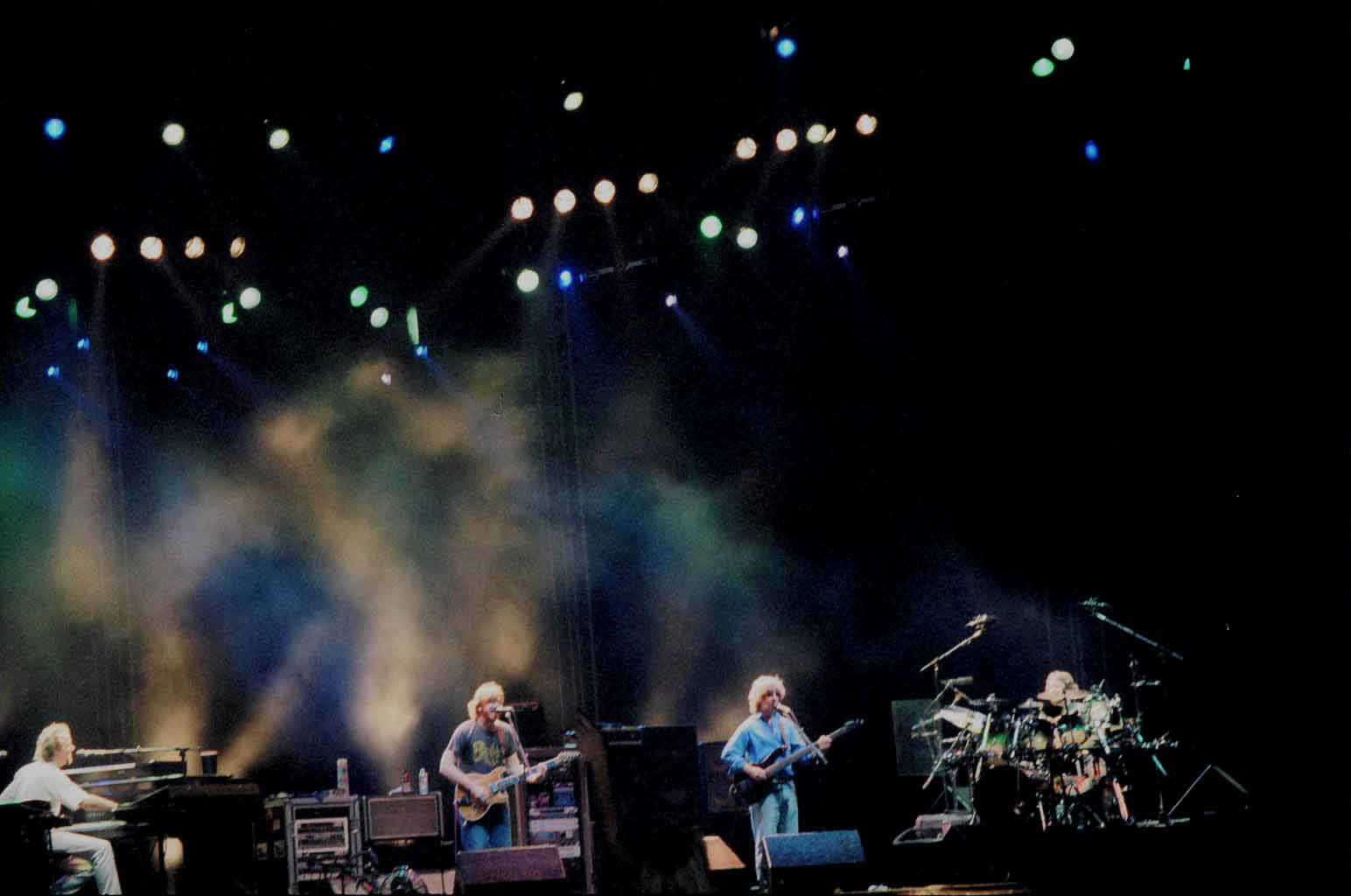
Phish performing at Lemonwheel in 1998

In the summer of 1998, the band held Lemonwheel, their second festival at Loring Air Force Base in Maine. The two-day event attracted 60,000 attendees. The band played another summer festival in 1999, called Camp Oswego and held at the Oswego County Airport in Volney, New York. Unlike other Phish festivals, Camp Oswego featured a prominent second stage of additional performers aside from Phish, including Del McCoury, The Slip and Ozomatli.

In July 1999, the band released an album of improvisational instrumentals titled The Siket Disc. The band followed that release with Hampton Comes Alive, a six-disc box set released in November 1999, which contained the entirety of their performances on November 20 and 21, 1998 at the Hampton Coliseum in Hampton, Virginia. The set marked the first time that complete recordings of Phish concerts were officially released by Elektra Records.

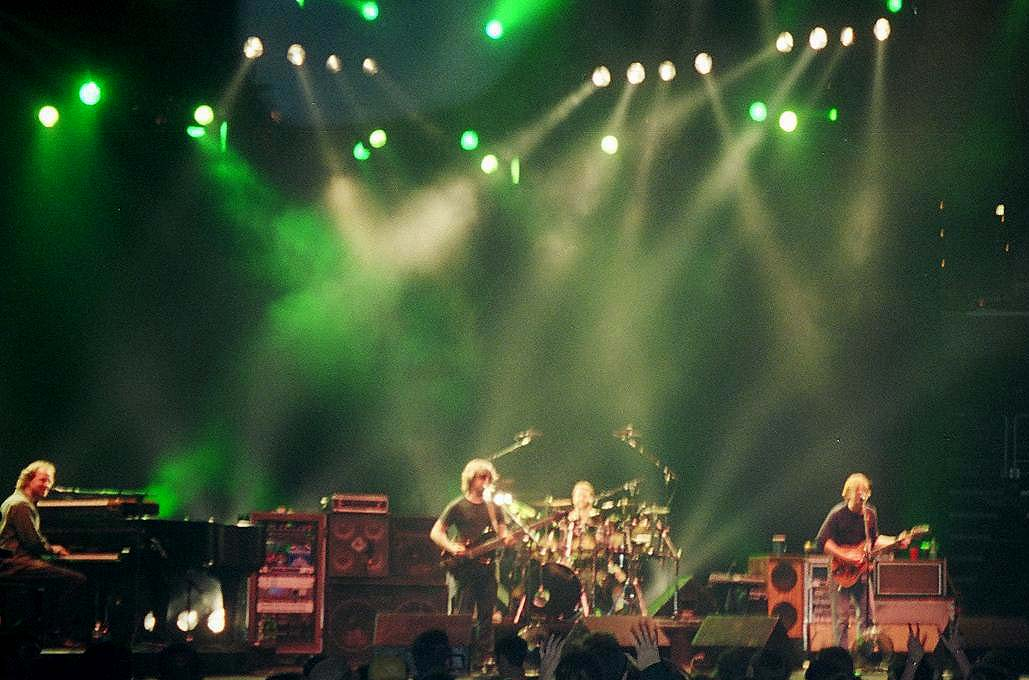
Phish performing in December 1999

To celebrate the new millennium, Phish hosted a two-day outdoor festival at the Big Cypress Seminole Indian Reservation in Florida in December 1999. The festival's climactic New Year's Eve concert, referred to by fans as simply "The Show", started at 11:35 p.m. on December 31, 1999, and continued through to sunrise on January 1, 2000, approximately eight hours later. The band's performance of the song "Heavy Things" at the festival was broadcast live as part of ABC's 2000 Today millennium coverage, giving the band their biggest television audience up to that point. 75,000 people attended the sold-out two-day festival. In 2017, Rolling Stone named the Big Cypress festival one of the "50 Greatest Concerts of the Last 50 Years".

=== Farmhouse and hiatus: 2000–2002 ===
Following the Big Cypress festival, the band issued their ninth studio album Farmhouse in May 2000. "Heavy Things", which was released as the album's first single, became the band's only song to appear on a mainstream pop radio format, reaching No. 29 on Billboard's Adult Top 40 chart that July. The song also became the band's biggest hit to date on the Adult Alternative Songs chart, reaching No. 2 there. In June 2000, the band embarked on a seven-date headlining tour of Japan. In July, they taped an appearance on the PBS music show Austin City Limits, which was aired in October.

In the summer of 2000, the band announced that they would take their first "extended time-out" following their upcoming fall tour. Anastasio officially announced the impending hiatus to the band's fans during their September 30 concert at the Thomas & Mack Center in Paradise, Nevada. During the tour's last concert on October 7, at the Shoreline Amphitheatre in Mountain View, California, the band made no reference to the hiatus, and left the stage without saying a word following their encore performance of "You Enjoy Myself", as The Beatles' "Let It Be" played over the venue's sound system.

Bittersweet Motel, a documentary film about the band directed by Todd Phillips, was released in August 2000, shortly before the hiatus began. The documentary captures the band's 1997 and 1998 tours, the Great Went festival and the recording of The Story of the Ghost. Phish were nominated in two categories at the 43rd Annual Grammy Awards in 2001: Best Boxed Recording Package for Hampton Comes Alive and Best Instrumental Rock Performance for "First Tube" from Farmhouse.

During Phish's hiatus, Elektra Records continued to issue archival releases of the band's concerts on compact disc. Between September 2001 and May 2003, the label released 20 entries in the Live Phish Series. These multi-disc sets featured complete soundboard recordings of concerts that were particularly popular with the band and their fanbase, similar to the Grateful Dead's Dick's Picks archival series. In November 2002, the label released the band's first concert DVD, Phish: Live in Vegas, which featured the entirety of the September 2000 concert at which Anastasio announced the hiatus.

In April 2002, Phish guest starred on the episode "Weekend at Burnsie's" of the animated series The Simpsons. The episode marked the band's first appearance together, albeit as animated characters, since the hiatus began. Phish provided their own voices for the episode and performed a snippet of "Run Like an Antelope".

=== Return, Round Room, Undermind, and disbandment: 2002–2004 ===
In August 2002, Phish's manager John Paluska announced the band planned to end their hiatus that December with a New Year's Eve concert at Madison Square Garden. They also recorded Round Room over the course of four days in October and released it on December 10. The band had initially planned to record the new album live at the Madison Square Garden concert, but instead felt that demos they had recorded of the material were strong enough to merit release as a studio album. Four days after the release of Round Room, the band appeared as a musical guest on the December 14 episode of Saturday Night Live, hosted by former Vice President of the United States Al Gore. During the episode, the band debuted the song "46 Days", appeared in a comedy sketch, and their song "You Enjoy Myself" was featured in a TV Funhouse cartoon segment. During their return concert on December 31, McConnell's brother was introduced as actor Tom Hanks. The impostor sang a line of the song "Wilson", prompting some media outlets to report that the actor had appeared at the concert.

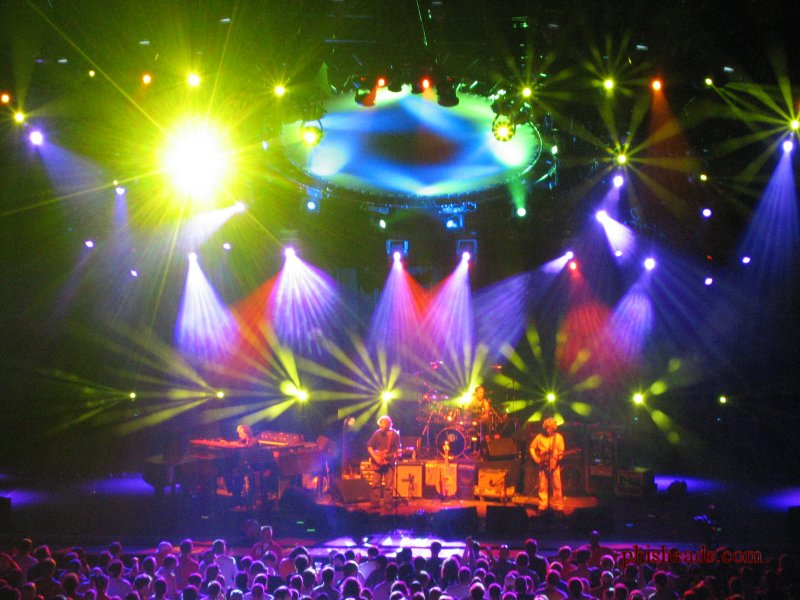
Phish in concert at the Alpine Valley Music Theatre in East Troy, Wisconsin, in July 2003, accompanied by a light show created by Chris Kuroda

At the end of the 2003 summer tour, Phish returned to Limestone, Maine for It, their first festival since Big Cypress. The event drew crowds of over 60,000 fans, and was the band's final festival to be held at Loring Air Force Base. Highlights from the festival were released on a DVD set, also called It, in October 2004. In November and December 2003, the band celebrated its 20th anniversary with a four-show mini-tour of shows in New York, Pennsylvania, and Massachusetts. The December 1 show at Pepsi Arena featured a guest appearance by former member Jeff Holdsworth, who sat in with the band on five songs, including his compositions "Possum" and "Camel Walk".

On May 25, 2004, Anastasio announced on the Phish website that the band would disband at the end of their 2004 summer tour. He wrote that he had met with the other members earlier that month to discuss the "Strong feelings I've been having that Phish has run its course, and that we should end it now while it's still on a high note." By the end of the meeting, he said, "We realized that after almost twenty-one years together, we were faced with the opportunity to graciously step away in unison, as a group, united in our friendship and our feelings of gratitude." The band's eleventh – and at the time final – studio album Undermind was released in June 2004. The band's summer 2004 began with two concerts at Keyspan Park in Brooklyn, New York. The first concert was recorded for the live album and concert documentary Phish: Live in Brooklyn, while the second featured a guest appearance by rapper Jay-Z, who performed two songs with the band. Later that summer, the band appeared on the Late Show with David Letterman and performed a seven-song set from atop the marquee of the Ed Sullivan Theater for fans who had gathered on the street.

The 2004 tour finished with the band's seventh summer festival on August 14 and 15, which were billed as their final performances. The Coventry festival was named for the town in Vermont that hosted the event, which was held at the nearby Newport State Airport. The concerts were simulcast in movie theaters and on XM Satellite Radio. "The Curtain With" was the final song the band performed at their then-final concert on August 15. After Coventry, the members of the band admitted they were disappointed with their performance at the festival; In the official book Phish: The Biography, Anastasio expressed that "Coventry itself was a nightmare. It was emotional, but it was not like we were at our finest. I certainly wasn't". The festival weekend was beset by logistical issues, including heavy rain, muddy conditions in the festival area and a traffic jam on Interstate 91.

=== Post-disbandment and interim: 2004–2008 ===
Following the breakup, the band's members remained in amicable communication with one another. The members also occasionally appeared on each other's solo albums and collaborated on side-projects.

In 2005, Phish formed their own record label, JEMP Records, to release archival CD and DVD sets. The label's first release was Phish: New Year's Eve 1995 – Live at Madison Square Garden, which was released in conjunction with Rhino Records in December 2005. The album was named the 42nd greatest live album of all time by Rolling Stone in April 2015. The label subsequently released several other archival live box sets, including Colorado '88 (2006), Vegas 96 (2007), At the Roxy (2008) and The Clifford Ball (2009).

In December 2006, Anastasio was arrested in Whitehall, New York for drug possession and driving while intoxicated, and was sentenced to 14 months in a drug court program. In 2007, while Anastasio was undergoing rehabilitation, the other members of Phish surprised him on his birthday with an instrumental recording they had made for him to play along with on guitar. During his rehabilitation, Anastasio said he "spent 24 hours a day thinking about nothing but Phish" and began discussing a reunion with the other members of the band.

Phish received the Jammys Lifetime Achievement Award on May 7, 2008, at The Theater at Madison Square Garden. All four members attended the ceremony and gave a speech, and both McConnell and Anastasio performed, although not together.

In response to a June 2008 rumor that Phish had reunited to record a new album, McConnell wrote a letter on the band's website updating fans on the current relations between the band's members. McConnell wrote that while the members remained friends, they were currently busy with other projects and the reunion rumors were premature. He added, "Later this year we hope to spend some time together and take a look at what possible futures we might enjoy." That September, the band played three songs at the wedding of their former tour manager Brad Sands. Later in 2008, the band reconvened at The Barn, Anastasio's farmhouse studio in Burlington, Vermont, for jamming sessions and rehearsals.

=== Reunion and Joy: 2008–2011 ===
On October 1, 2008, the band announced on their website that they had officially reunited, and would play their first shows in five years in March 2009 at the Hampton Coliseum in Hampton, Virginia. The three reunion concerts were held on March 6, 7 and 8, 2009, with "Fluffhead" being the first song the band played onstage at the first show. Approximately 14,000 people attended the concerts over the course of three days, and the band made the shows available for free download on their LivePhish website for a limited time, to accommodate fans who were unable to attend.

When the band decided to reunite, the members agreed to limit their touring schedule, and they have typically performed about 50 concerts a year since. Following the reunion weekend, Phish embarked on a summer tour which began in May with a concert at Fenway Park in Boston. The Fenway show was followed by a 25-date tour which included performances at the 2009 edition of the Bonnaroo Music Festival in Tennessee and a four date stand at Red Rocks Amphitheatre in Colorado. At Bonnaroo, Phish was joined by Bruce Springsteen on guitar for three songs.

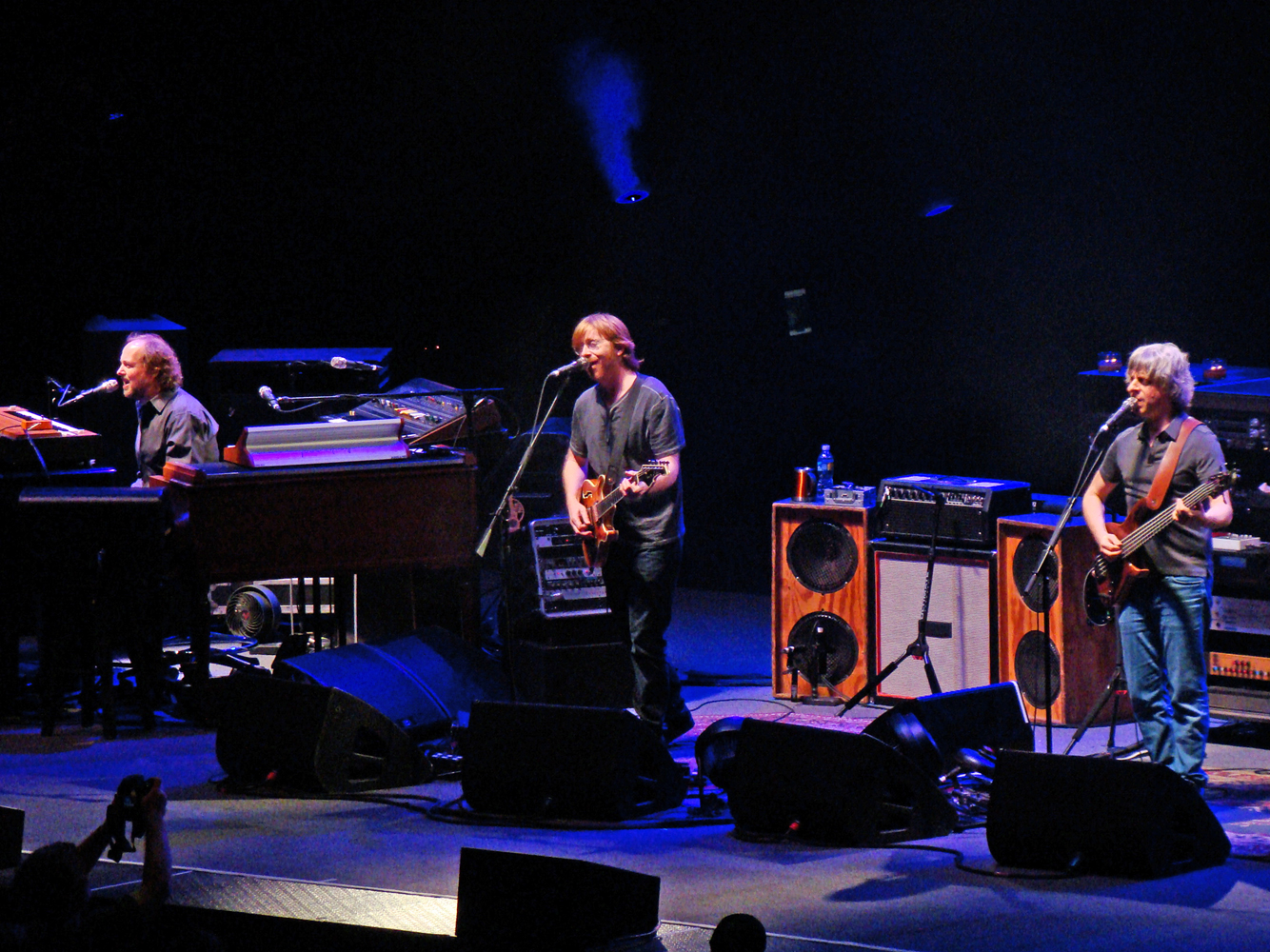
Phish performing in December 2009

Phish's fourteenth studio album, Joy, produced by Steve Lillywhite, was released September 8, 2009. "Backwards Down the Number Line", a single from the Joy album, reached number 9 on the Billboard Adult Alternative Songs chart in October. In October, the band held Festival 8, their first multi-day festival event since Coventry in 2004, at the Empire Polo Club in Indio, California.

In March 2010, Anastasio inducted Genesis, one of his favorite bands, into the Rock and Roll Hall of Fame at the museum's annual ceremony in New York City. In addition to Anastasio's speech, Phish performed the Genesis songs "Watcher of the Skies" and "No Reply at All" at the event. Phish toured in the summer and fall of 2010, and their concerts at Alpine Valley Music Theatre in East Troy, Wisconsin and the Utica Memorial Auditorium in Utica, New York were issued as CD/DVD sets in 2010 and 2011 respectively.

=== Fuego and Big Boat: 2011–2016 ===
Phish's ninth festival, Super Ball IX, took place at the Watkins Glen International race track in Watkins Glen, New York on July 1–3, 2011. It was the first concert to take place at Watkins Glen International since Summer Jam at Watkins Glen in 1973. In September, the band played a benefit concert in Essex Junction, Vermont which raised $1.2 million for Vermont flood victim relief in the aftermath of Hurricane Irene.

In June 2012, Phish headlined Bonnaroo 2012 with the Red Hot Chili Peppers and Radiohead. During their 2013 Halloween concert at Boardwalk Hall in Atlantic City, New Jersey, the band played twelve new songs from their upcoming album, which at the time had the working title Wingsuit and would later be renamed Fuego. During the concert, the band was joined onstage by actor Abe Vigoda, who is mentioned by name in the song "Wombat", dressed in a wombat costume.

Phish ended 2013 with a New Year's Eve concert at Madison Square Garden that also celebrated their 30th anniversary, as they had played their first concert in December 1983. The concert featured a nine-minute montage film celebrating the band's career, and the band performed an entire set in the middle of the arena from atop an equipment truck.

Phish released Fuego, their first studio album in five years, on June 24, 2014. The album peaked at number 7 on the Billboard 200 album chart, and became their highest charting album since Billy Breathes reached the same position in 1996. During their Halloween 2014 concert at MGM Grand Las Vegas, the band performed a set consisting of ten original songs inspired by the 1964 Walt Disney Records sound effects album Chilling, Thrilling Sounds of the Haunted House.

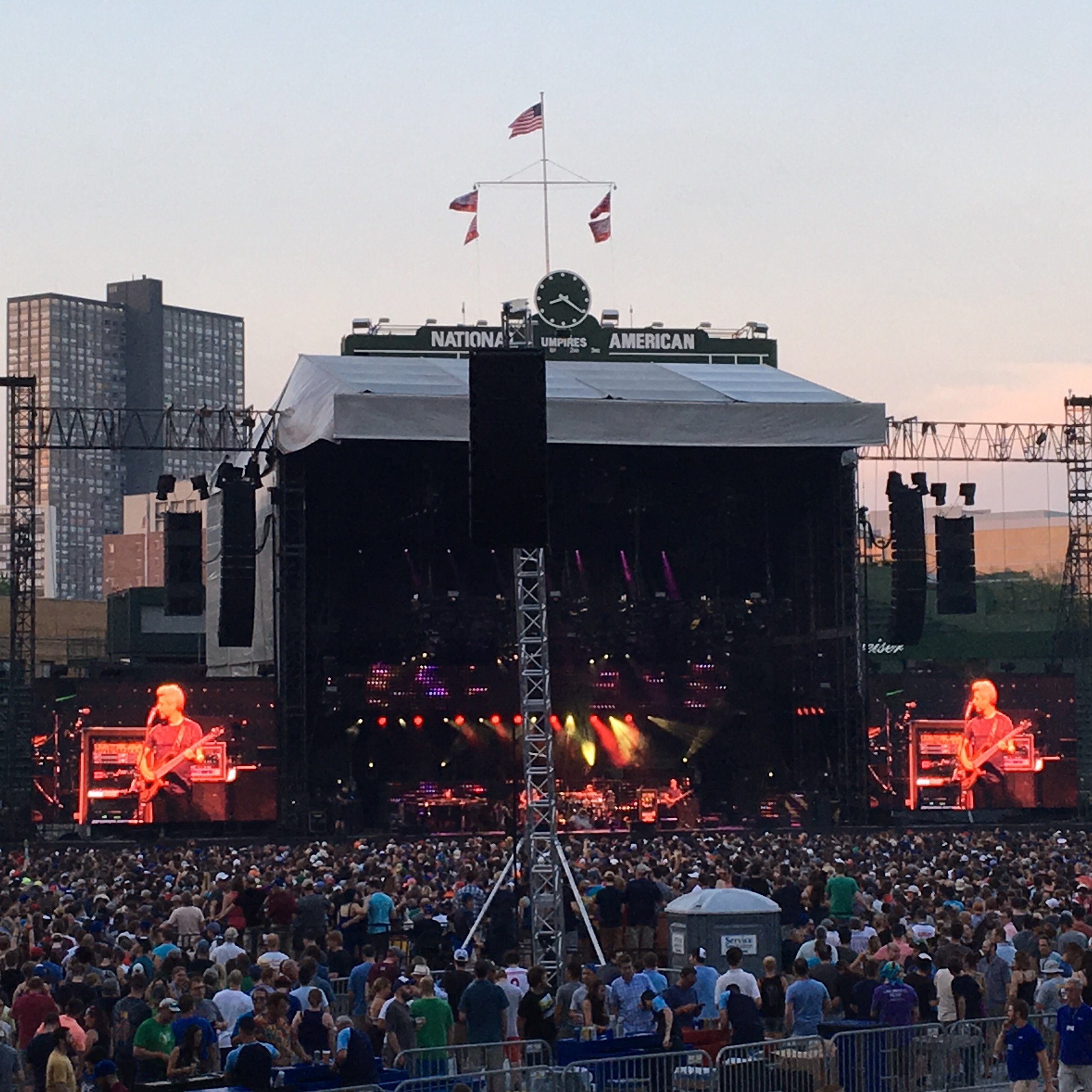
Phish's 2016 Summer Tour included their first visit to Wrigley Field in Chicago.

In 2015, Phish performed both a summer tour and their tenth multi-day festival event, Magnaball, was held at the Watkins International Speedway in New York in August. Phish's fourteenth studio album, Big Boat, was released on October 7, 2016.

=== The Baker's Dozen and Kasvot Växt: 2017–2019 ===
Phish played a 13-night concert residency at New York City's Madison Square Garden from July 21 to August 6, 2017, dubbed "The Baker's Dozen". Each concert featured a loose theme with performances of unique cover songs and a special doughnut served each night to the audience by Federal Donuts of Philadelphia. No songs were repeated during the Baker's Dozen run, with a total of 237 individual songs performed across the 13 concerts. The complete Baker's Dozen residency was released as a limited edition 36-disc box set in November 2018. A scaled-down triple CD set featuring 13 song performances, titled The Baker's Dozen: Live at Madison Square Garden, was issued simultaneously with the box set.

Phish planned to hold an eleventh summer festival, Curveball, in Watkins Glen, New York in 2018, but the festival was canceled by New York Department of Health officials, one day before it was scheduled to begin, due to water quality issues from flooding in the area. At their Halloween concert that October at the MGM Grand in Las Vegas, the band performed a set of all-new original material that they promoted as a "cover" of í rokk by Kasvot Växt, a fictional 1980s Scandinavian progressive rock band they had created. The Kasvot Växt set was released as a standalone live album on Spotify on November 10, 2018. All four concerts in the 2018 Halloween run were livestreamed in 4K resolution, which marked the first time that a major musical act had ever offered a 4K livestreaming option.

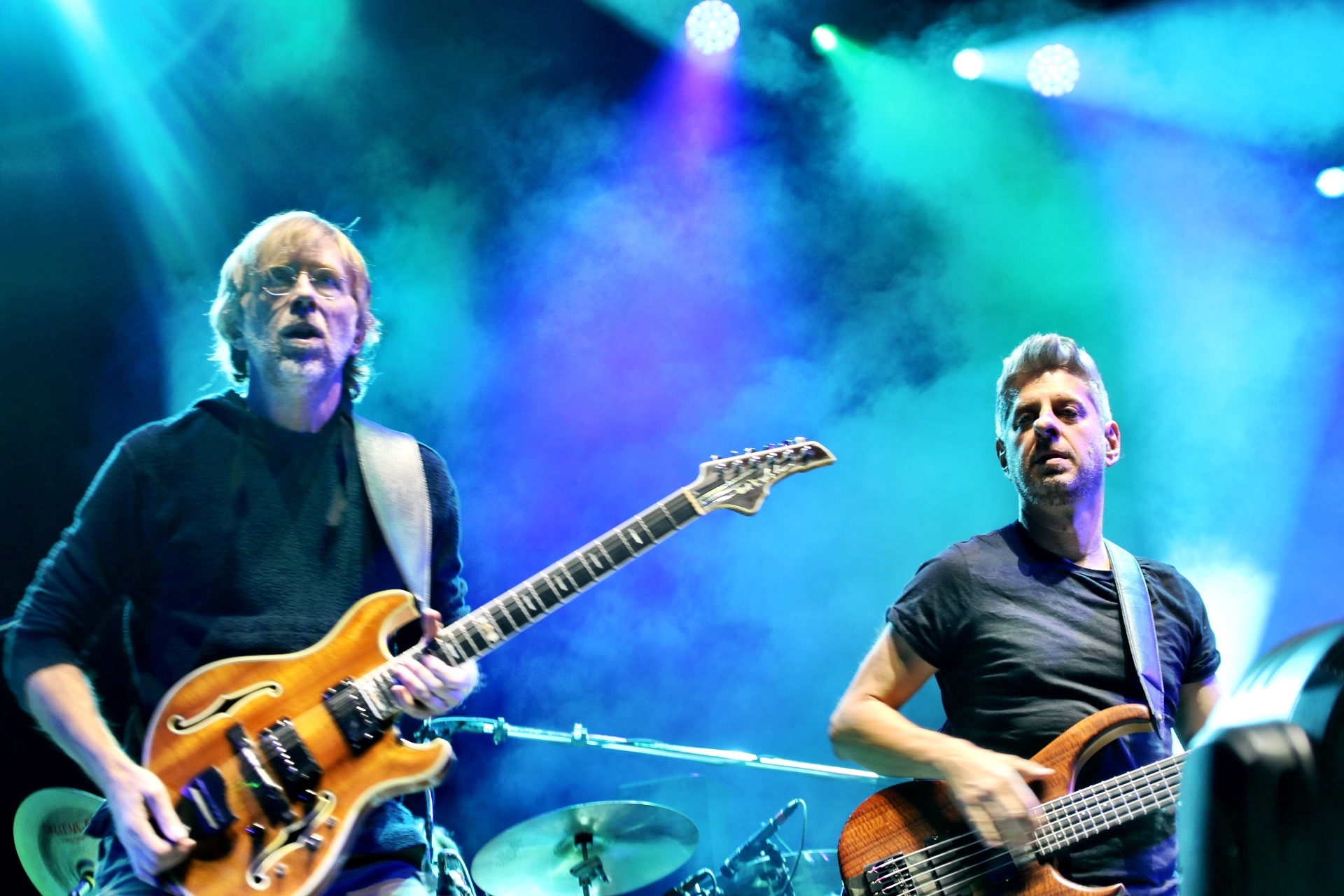
Anastasio and Gordon during a Phish concert in September 2019

Between Me and My Mind, a documentary film directed by Steven Cantor about Anastasio's life, his Ghosts of the Forest side-project and Phish's 2017 New Year's Eve concert, was screened at the Tribeca Film Festival in April 2019. In June 2019, SiriusXM launched Phish Radio, a satellite radio station dedicated to the band's music.

=== Sigma Oasis and Evolve: 2020–present ===
Due to the COVID-19 pandemic, Phish postponed their 2020 summer tour until 2021. Before 2020, Phish had embarked on a summer tour every year since their 2009 reunion. During the COVID-19 pandemic, Phish hosted free weekly "Dinner and a Movie" webcasts of archival performances on Tuesday evenings until Labor Day weekend, after which they were hosted monthly.

Phish released their fifteenth studio album Sigma Oasis on April 2, 2020. The album was premiered through a listening party on their LivePhish app, SiriusXM radio station and Facebook page. The album consists entirely of material the band had been performing in concert over the course of the previous decade, but had yet to appear on a studio release.

Phish performed their first concert since the start of the pandemic on July 28, 2021, at the Walmart AMP in Rogers, Arkansas, having not performed since February 23, 2020. Beginning with their concerts at The Gorge Amphitheatre in late August, the band began requiring attendees to show proof of vaccination or a negative test for COVID-19. During their 2021 Halloween concert, Phish debuted a set of new original science fiction-themed material under the guise of the fictional band Sci-Fi Soldier. According to Pollstar, Phish were the ninth highest grossing concert act in the world in 2021, with a $44.4 million gross from 35 concerts. Phish also had the fifth highest concert ticket sales in the world in 2021, with 572,626 tickets sold.

Due to an increase of cases of the Omicron variant of COVID-19 in New York City, Phish postponed their 2021 New Year's Eve concerts at Madison Square Garden from December 2021 to April 2022. In lieu of the traditional New Year's Eve concert, Phish instead performed a three set New Year's Eve concert on December 31, 2021, from a soundstage they dubbed "The Ninth Cube".

Phish released Get More Down, a studio version of their Sci-Fi Soldier material, on October 31, 2022. In August 2023, Phish performed two benefit concerts at the Saratoga Performing Arts Center in Saratoga Springs, New York for recovery efforts following a flood in Vermont and upstate New York earlier that summer. The band raised $3.5 million for the relief efforts through their two concerts and merchandise sales. The band performed a version of their Gamehendge song cycle at their 2023 New Year's Eve concert at Madison Square Garden, which featured actors portraying the story's characters, and an appearance by actress and musician Annie Golden during the song "Harpua".

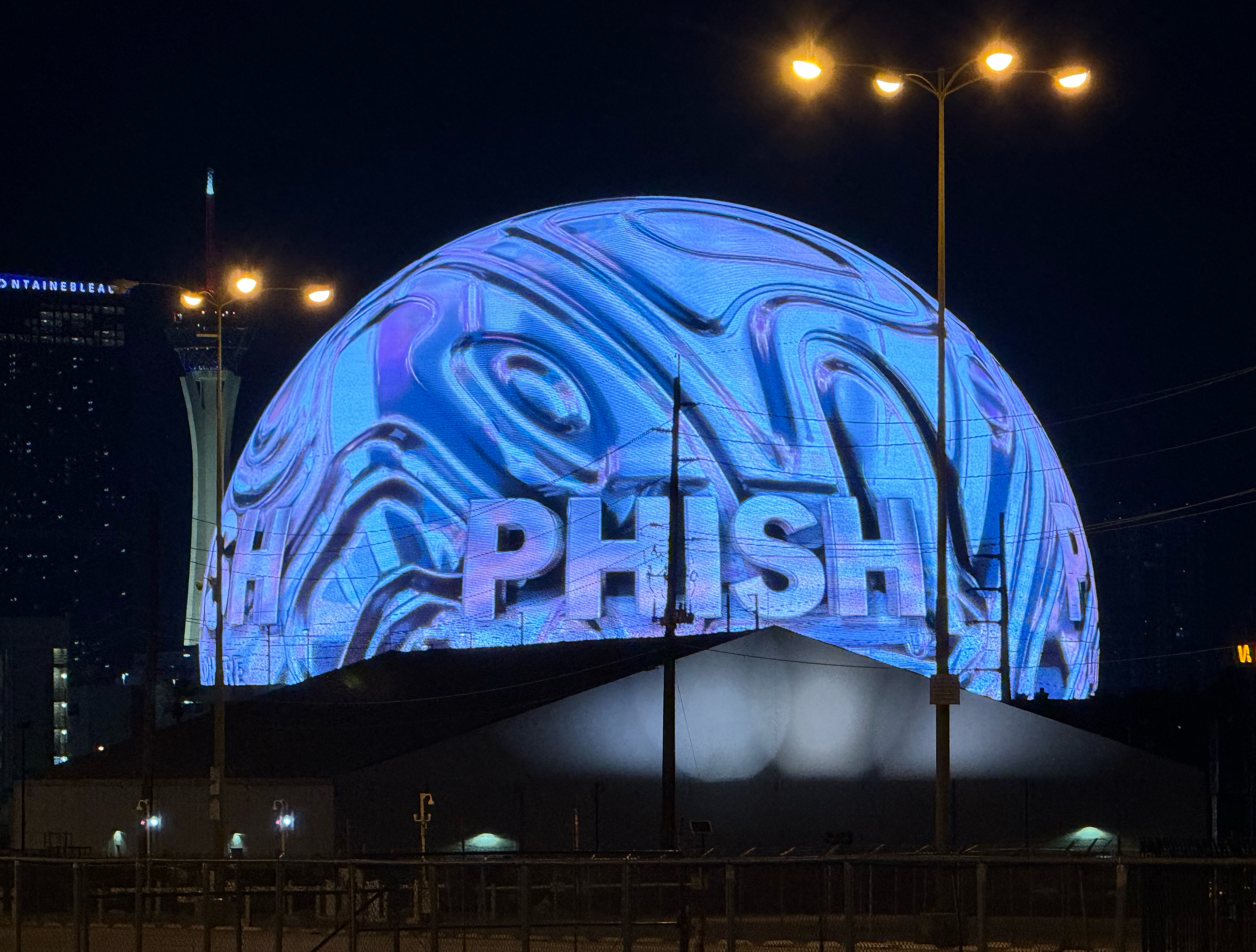
The exterior of Sphere during the band's four-date concert series at the venue in 2024

Phish performed four concerts at Sphere in Paradise, Nevada in April 2024, and were the second music act, after U2, to perform at the venue. The concerts featured visual effects created by the Montreal studio Moment Factory. The four shows grossed $13.4 million from 65,665 tickets sold.

Evolve, Phish's sixteenth studio album, was released on July 12, 2024. Mondegreen, a four-day Phish festival at the Woodlands of Dover Motor Speedway in Dover, Delaware, was held in August 2024. 45,000 people attended the four-day Mondegreen festival.

Phish were nominated for induction into the Rock and Roll Hall of Fame for the first time in 2025, but were not among that year's inductees. The members of Phish appeared in a Seinfeld parody sketch on an episode of Everybody's Live with John Mulaney in April 2025.

The band returned to Sphere in April 2026 for a nine show residency. Phish performed their 92nd through 96th shows at Madison Square Garden in the summer of 2026, with set lists themed around their repertoire from 1992, 1993, 1994, 1995, and 1996 for each respective show. At an August 2026 concert at Fenway Park, Phish performed a cover of "Melt the Guns" by XTC for the first time since April 1987, or 2,051 concerts, which was the longest gap between two performances of a song in the band's history. During a September 2026 concert at Boardwalk Hall in Atlantic City, New Jersey, Phish became the first musical act to utilize the venue's historic pipe organ at one of their shows, when Page McConnell played it at the end of "The Squirming Coil".

Phish will perform their 100th concert at Madison Square Garden on January 2, 2027.

== Reception and legacy ==
Phish were part of the jam band scene that gained prominence in the mid 1990s. Following the death of Jerry Garcia in 1995, the Los Angeles Times named Phish as among the scene's most prominent bands, alongside Blues Traveler, the Dave Matthews Band, Spin Doctors, and Widespread Panic. Phish's popularity grew in the 1990s due to fans sharing concert recordings that had been taped by audience members and distributed online for free. Phish were among the first musical acts to use the internet to grow their fanbase, with fans using file-sharing websites such as etree and BitTorrent to share concerts.

In 1998, Rolling Stone described Phish as "the most important band of the '90s". Phish have been named as an influence by other acts in the jam band scene, including Umphrey's McGee and the Disco Biscuits Other musicians have also counted Phish as an influence, including Adam Levine and James Valentine of Maroon 5, Ed O'Brien of Radiohead, Brandon Boyd of Incubus, and reggae musician Matisyahu.

Phish's festival events in the 1990s inspired the foundation of the Bonnaroo Music Festival in Tennessee, which was first held in 2002. Co-founder Rick Farman, a Phish fan, consulted Phish managers Richard Glasgow and John Paluska about festival infrastructure during the early stages of planning. The festivals also inspired other jam band-oriented concert events, such as the Disco Biscuits' Camp Bisco, Electric Forest Festival, and the Big Ears Festival.

Phish are well known to their loyal fans, called Phishheads, but the group's music and fan culture are otherwise polarizing to general audiences. The tribal nature of Phish supporters has encouraged comparisons of Phishheads to the Juggalos, followers of the hip-hop duo Insane Clown Posse. Phish heavily contributes to music-based tourism with their "traveling communities" of fans, and they have been simultaneously hailed and criticized for their near-constant tour dates, which bring with them the capital value of tourism and necessitates the increased security and community planning that come with any music festival. Jordan Hoffman of Thrillist explains "the solace many find in attending religious services is somewhat mirrored for me in seeing Phish," and even though Phish fans are generally considered welcoming and friendly, the reception of the group from the outside is often one of unease and confusion. The BBC listed Phish as one of "Eight smash US acts that Britain never understood" along with fellow jam bands Dave Matthews Band and Blues Traveler. In describing the band to a British audience, BBC journalist Stephen Dowling wrote "Attending a Phish gig has become a rite of summer passage for American teens in the same way that attending Glastonbury has for British teenagers."

The band has a number of celebrity fans, including Sean Avery, Rocco Baldelli, Drew Carey, Joseph Gordon-Levitt, Abbi Jacobson, Katy Tur, Aron Ralston, and Bill Walton. Bernie Sanders, who was the mayor of Burlington when Phish formed, described them as "One of the great bands in this country" in 2016.

Phish has performed 96 concerts at Madison Square Garden since their debut performance there in 1994. In August 2023, Phish surpassed Elton John as the musical act with the second-most concerts performed at Madison Square Garden, behind only record-holder Billy Joel.

In 2019, Billboard ranked Phish as the 33rd-highest-grossing concert touring act of the 2010s. In 2022, Pollstar listed Phish as the 33rd-highest-grossing touring act from 1980 to 2022, with a cumulative gross of $595.8 million. Pollstar also listed Phish as the act with the ninth most tickets sold in that same time frame, with 13.3 million tickets sold.

== Musical style and influences ==
According to The New Rolling Stone Album Guide, the music of Phish is "oriented around group improvisation and super-extended grooves". Their songs draw on a range of rock-oriented influences, including funk, jazz fusion, progressive rock, bluegrass, and psychedelic rock. Some Phish songs use different vocal approaches, such as a cappella (unaccompanied) sections of barbershop quartet-style vocal harmonies. The band began to include barbershop segments in their concerts in 1993, when the four members began taking lessons from McConnell's landlord, who was a judge at barbershop competitions. In the 1997 official biography, The Phish Book, Anastasio coined the term "cow-funk" to describe the band's late 1990s funk and jazz-funk-influenced playing style, observing that "What we're doing now is really more about groove than funk. Good funk, real funk, is not played by four white guys from Vermont."

Phish were often compared to the Grateful Dead during the 1990s, a comparison that the band members often resisted or distanced themselves from. The two bands were compared due to their emphasis on live performances, improvisational jamming style, musical similarities, and traveling fanbase. In November 1995, Anastasio told The Baltimore Sun, "When we first came into the awareness of the media, it would always be the Dead or Zappa they'd compare us to. All of these bands I love, you know? But I got very sensitive about it." Early in their career, Phish would occasionally cover Grateful Dead songs in concert, but the band stopped doing so by the late 1980s. In Phish: The Biography, Parke Puterbaugh observed "The bottom line is while it's impossible to imagine Phish without the Grateful Dead as forebears, many other musicians figured as influences upon them. Some of them – such as Carlos Santana and Frank Zappa – were arguably at least as significant as the Grateful Dead. In reality, the media certainly overplayed the Grateful Dead connection and Phish probably underplayed it, at least in their first decade." Anastasio has also cited progressive rock artists such as King Crimson and Genesis as significant influences on Phish's early material. In a 2019 New York Times interview, he observed, "If you listen to the first couple of Phish albums, they don't sound anything like the Grateful Dead. I was more interested in Yes."

In his 2018 book Twilight of the Gods, music critic Steven Hyden wrote that he found the Grateful Dead and Phish to have "significantly different reference points" in terms of influence and style. The Grateful Dead, Hyden explained, were "informed by the totality of American music from the first sixty years of the twentieth century: Blues, country, folk, jazz, and early rock 'n' roll," while Phish's music contains elements of "hopped-up bluegrass, jazzy disco, porno-movie funk, Broadway theatricality, and shockingly sincere barbershop harmonies. But it all stems from classic rock." Hyden observed that "If the Dead encompasses American music from roughly 1900 to 1967, Phish picks up the story right through the AOR era, from '68 to around the time Stop Making Sense debuted in theaters in the mid-eighties."

== Live performances ==
The driving force behind Phish is the popularity of their concerts and the fan culture surrounding the event. Each a production unto itself, the band is known to consistently change set lists and details, as well as the addition of their own antics to ensure that no two shows are ever the same. With fans flocking to venues hours before they open, the concert is the centerpiece of an event that includes a temporary community in the parking lot similar to the "Shakedown Street" bazaar held outside Grateful Dead concerts.

Similar to the Grateful Dead, Phish concerts typically feature two sets, with an intermission in between. During concerts, songs often segue into one another, or produce improvisational jams that can last 10 minutes or more depending on the song. Several regularly performed songs in Phish's repertoire have never appeared on one of their studio albums; these include "Possum", "Mike's Song", "I Am Hydrogen", "Weekapaug Groove", "Harry Hood", "Runaway Jim", "Suzy Greenberg", "AC/DC Bag" and "The Lizards", all of which date to 1990 or earlier and have been played by Phish over 300 times in concert.

Chris Kuroda, who has been Phish's lighting director since 1989, creates elaborate light displays during the band's concerts that are sometimes improvised in a similar fashion to their music. Justin Taylor of The Baffler wrote, "You could hate this music with every fiber of your being and still be ready to give Chris Kuroda a MacArthur "genius" grant for what he achieves with his light rig." Kuroda is often referred to by fans as the unofficial fifth member of the band, and has been given the nickname "CK5".

Since Phish fans began to discuss the band's live performances on the internet in the late 1990s, they have developed a widely used framework for analyzing the varied forms of improvisation that would regularly occur during a given show. A January 1997 post by Phish fan John Flynn on the rec.music.phish Usenet group first defined the two "types" of jamming that Phish performs in concert. Flynn wrote: "I think Phish jamming falls into two types of jamming: 1) Jamming that is based around a fixed chord progression 2) Jamming that improvises chord progressions, rhythms, and the whole structure of the music." Since then, Phish fans have used the terms "Type 1" and "Type 2" and Flynn's definitions to contextualize the structure of Phish's shows and songs.

Because Phish's reputation is so grounded in their live performances, concert recordings are commonly traded commodities. In December 2002, the band launched the LivePhish website, from which official soundboard recordings can be purchased. Legal field recordings produced by tapers with boom microphones from the audience in compliance with Phish's tape trading policy are frequently traded on any number of music message boards. Although technically not allowed, live videos of Phish shows are also traded by fans and are tolerated as long as they are for non-profit, personal use. Phish fans have been noted for their extensive collections of fan-taped concert recordings; owning recordings of entire tours and years is widespread.

Fans' recordings are generally sourced from the officially designated tapers' section at each show, by fans with devoted sound recording rigs. Tickets for the tapers' section are acquired separately from regular audience tickets, and directly from the band's website, instead of the venue or a service like Ticketmaster. However, tapers are also required to purchase a general admission ticket for concerts. Recordings patched from Paul Languedoc's soundboard were also made until 1994 and circulated among fans.

In 2014, the band launched their own on-demand streaming service, LivePhish+. The platform features hundreds of soundboard recordings of the band's concerts for streaming, including all of their shows from 2002 onwards, as well as all of their studio albums. Phish continues to allow fans to tape and distribute audience recordings of their concerts after the launch of the LivePhish storefront and streaming services.

== Books and podcasts ==
Several books on Phish have been published, including two official publications: The Phish Book, a 1998 coffee table book credited to the band members and journalist Richard Gehr which focused on the band's activities during 1996 and 1997, and Phish: The Biography, a semi-official biographical book written by music journalist and Phish fan Parke Puterbaugh, was published in 2009 and was based on interviews with the four band members, their friends and crew. An installment of the 33⅓ book series on A Live One, written by Walter Holland, was published in 2015. The 2013 book You Don't Know Me but You Don't Like Me: Phish, Insane Clown Posse, and My Misadventures with Two of Music's Most Maligned Tribes, written by music critic Nathan Rabin, compares and contrasts the fanbases of Phish and Insane Clown Posse.

In addition to books, there have been multiple podcasts which have focused on Phish, its music, and its fanbase as their central topics of discussion. Among the first was Analyze Phish, which was hosted by comedians Harris Wittels and Scott Aukerman for the Earwolf podcast network; it ran for ten episodes posted between 2011 and 2014. The podcast followed Wittels, a devoted fan of the band, in his humorous attempts to get Aukerman to enjoy their music. Despite its truncated run, Analyze Phish inspired Phish lyricist Tom Marshall to start his own Phish podcast, Under the Scales, in 2016. In 2018, Marshall co-founded the Osiris Podcasting Network, which hosts Under the Scales and other music podcasts, many of which are devoted to Phish or other jam bands. In September 2019, C13Originals debuted Long May They Run, a music documentary podcast series; the first season, consisting of 10 episodes, focused on Phish's history and influence on the live music scene. In November 2019, the Osiris Podcasting Network premiered After Midnight, a five-episode documentary series exploring the creation, execution, and aftermath of Phish's 1999 Big Cypress festival.

== Other appearances ==
Seattle Seahawks fans began mimicking Phish's song "Wilson" by chanting the song's opening line when quarterback Russell Wilson took the field during games. The new tradition started after Anastasio made the suggestion at shows in Seattle. The story behind the "Wilson" chant was featured in a 2014 documentary short by NFL Films.

== Band members ==
Current members

- Trey Anastasio – guitar, lead vocals (1983–2004; 2008–present)
- Jon Fishman – drums, percussion, vocals, vacuum (1983–2004; 2008–present)
- Mike Gordon – bass, vocals (1983–2004; 2008–present)
- Page McConnell – keyboards, vocals (1985–2004; 2008–present)

Auxiliary personnel

- Tom Marshall – songwriting, occasional backing vocals (1984–2004; 2008–present)
- Chris Kuroda – concert lighting director (1989–2004; 2008–present)
- Paul Languedoc – sound engineer (1986–2004), luthier (1986–2004; 2008–present)

Former members

- Jeff Holdsworth – guitar, vocals (1983–1986; guest in 2003)

Former touring musicians

- Marc Daubert – percussion, backing vocals (1984–1985)
- Giant Country Horns or Cosmic Country Horns – horn section (1991, 1994)

== Studio discography ==
- Junta (1989)
- Lawn Boy (1990)
- A Picture of Nectar (1992)
- Rift (1993)
- Hoist (1994)
- Billy Breathes (1996)
- The Story of the Ghost (1998)
- The Siket Disc (1999)
- Farmhouse (2000)
- Round Room (2002)
- Undermind (2004)
- Joy (2009)
- Fuego (2014)
- Big Boat (2016)
- Sigma Oasis (2020)
- Evolve (2024)
