= Evolve (Phish album) =

Studio album by Phish
- Released: July 12, 2024
- Recorded: November 2023
- Studio: The Barn (Vermont); Sputnik (Nashville); Reservoir (New York); The Bunker (Burlington); Tank (Burlington); Trout (Brooklyn)
- Length: 56:00; 60:30 (vinyl)
- Label: JEMP
- Producer: Bryce Goggin; Vance Powell

Phish chronology
The Spectrum '97 (2024)	Evolve (2024)

Singles from Evolve
- 1. "Evolve" Released: April 11, 2024; 2. "Oblivion" Released: May 21, 2024; 3. "Hey Stranger" Released: June 11, 2024; 4. "Life Saving Gun" Released: July 9, 2024

Evolve is the sixteenth studio album by Vermont-based jam band Phish. It was released on July 12, 2024, through the band's own JEMP Records. It is the first Phish album in four years, following Sigma Oasis (2020), although they also released the album Get More Down under the alter-ego "Sci-Fi Soldier" in 2022. Evolve was produced by Bryce Goggin and Vance Powell. The album's cover art features a painting by Mehdi Ghadyanloo.

"Evolve", the album's title track, was first played live by Phish in August 2021 and was released as its first single on April 11, 2024. The song peaked at number 39 on the Billboard Adult Alternative Airplay chart that June. "Oblivion", first played by Phish in July 2023, was released as the second single on May 21, 2024. "Hey Stranger", first played by Phish in December 2022, was released as the penultimate single on June 11, 2024. "Life Saving Gun", first played by Phish in July 2023, was released as the fourth and final single on July 9, 2024.

The tracks "Evolve", "A Wave of Hope", and "Lonely Trip" had previously appeared on Trey Anastasio's eleventh solo album, Lonely Trip, in July 2020, "Hey Stranger" and "Mercy" had appeared on Anastasio's twelfth album, Mercy, in 2022, and "Life Saving Gun" had previously appeared on Anastasio and Phish keyboardist Page McConnell's collaborative album January in 2023.

== Track listing ==
Evolve track listing
No.	Title	Writer(s)	Length
1.	"Hey Stranger"	Trey Anastasio	4:17
2.	"Oblivion"	Anastasio; Tom Marshall	6:03
3.	"Evolve"	Anastasio; Scott Herman; Marshall	4:12
4.	"A Wave of Hope"	Anastasio	5:04
5.	"Pillow Jets"	Anastasio	5:57
6.	"Lonely Trip"	Anastasio; Herman; Marshall	6:00
7.	"Life Saving Gun"	Anastasio; Page McConnell	4:25
8.	"Monsters"	Anastasio	5:15
9.	"Ether Edge"	Anastasio	4:06
10.	"Human Nature"	Mike Gordon; Scott Murawski	2:54
11.	"Valdese"	Anastasio; Marshall	3:36
12.	"The Well"	Anastasio; Marshall	4:30
13.	"Mercy"	Anastasio	4:11
Total length:			60:30

Note

- "The Well" is included only on vinyl editions of the album.

== Personnel ==
Phish

- Trey Anastasio
- Jon Fishman
- Mike Gordon
- Page McConnell

Additional musicians

- Don Hart – conductor
- David Davidson – violin, section leader
- David Angell – violin
- Monisa Angell – viola
- Seanad Chang – viola
- Wei Tsun Chang – violin
- Janet Darnall – violin
- Noah Denney – percussion
- Una Gong – cello
- Paul Nelson – cello
- Carole Rabinowitz – cello
- Sari Reist – cello
- Karen Winkelmann – violin

Technical

- Bryce Goggin – production, recording
- Vance Powell – production, mixing, recording
- Pete Lyman – mastering
- Michael Fahey – recording, technical assistance
- Koehn Terry – mixing assistance, technical assistance
- Ben Collette – technical assistance
- Ron Baldwin – additional technical assistance
- Chelsea Boisen – additional technical assistance
- Roy Ericson – additional technical assistance
- Chris Friday – additional technical assistance
- Abby Fusco – additional technical assistance
- Rob O'Dea – additional technical assistance
- Eddie Piotrowski – additional technical assistance
- Gene Sinigaliano – additional technical assistance
- Justin Stabler – additional technical assistance
- Jeff Tanski – additional technical assistance
- James Van de Bogert – additional technical assistance
- Lindsay Xenakis – additional technical assistance
- Stephanie Yeager – additional technical assistance
- Don Hart – string arrangement on "Evolve", "Pillow Jets", "Monsters, "Lonely Trip", "Ether Edge", and "Mercy"
- Stephen Lamb – string arrangement on "Pillow Jets" and "Monsters"
- Patrick Hart – string arrangement on "Valdese"

Visuals

- Mehdi Ghadyanloo – cover painting (Exploration of Gravity), inside painting (Shared Future)
- Julia Mordaunt – art direction, package design

== Charts ==
Chart performance for Evolve
Chart (2024)	Peak position
US Billboard 200	69
US Independent Albums (Billboard)	14
US Top Rock & Alternative Albums (Billboard)	19
