= Kasvot Växt: í rokk =

Live album by Phish
- Released: November 9, 2018
- Recorded: October 31, 2018
- Venue: MGM Grand Garden Arena, Paradise, Nevada
- Genre: Progressive rock
- Length: 68:25
- Label: JEMP

Phish chronology
St. Louis '93 (2017)	Kasvot Växt: í rokk (2018)	The Complete Baker's Dozen (2018)

Kasvot Växt: í rokk is a live album by American jam band Phish. It was released on music streaming services on November 9, 2018. It is a recording of the second set of their Halloween concert on October 31, 2018, at the MGM Grand Garden Arena in Paradise, Nevada, in which the band performed music credited to "Kasvot Växt", a fictional Scandinavian progressive rock band. The ten songs played during this set were attributed to this band, and purported to appear on their 1981 album, í rokk, but were in reality new original Phish compositions that have since been incorporated into their live repertoire.

== Background ==
Kasvot Växt: í rokk (which roughly translates to "face plant into rock" (Note: Here, kasvot is Finnish for "face", växt is Swedish for "sprout" or "plant", and í is Icelandic and Faroese for "in" or "into". Both kasvot and växt derive from words originally meaning "growth".)) continues Phish's tradition of "musical costume" performances during their Halloween shows, which they had begun in 1994 with a performance of The Beatles' self-titled White Album in its entirety. While these performances were primarily known for Phish's covers of already existing albums, the band began to experiment with performing full albums of new material in this format. This set represents the third of four instances of new material appearing this way, following 2013's Wingsuit performance (which eventually evolved into their 2014 album Fuego), and their "cover" of the Disney spoken word album Chilling, Thrilling Sounds of the Haunted House, which consisted of new instrumental compositions sampling the original album. Phish later continued this trend with their 2021 performance of Get More Down, another album by a fictional band, the futuristic "Sci-Fi Soldier".

The Kasvot Växt concept was created by Phish after the cancelation of their Curveball festival in August 2018. The festival was canceled 24 hours before its opening due to flooding and water supply issues in the Watkins Glen area. Following the cancelation, guitarist Trey Anastasio came up with the idea to create a fictional band for Phish to perform as on Halloween. The band was originally called the Sphere before being changed to Kasvot Växt. Phish wrote the album's ten songs at his Vermont recording studio and rehearsal space The Barn.

Leading up to their October 31 concert, Phish created media referring to Kasvot Växt on various webpages to further the prank, including an AllMusic page that featured a biography of the band and an album review of í rokk, both written by Stephen Thomas Erlewine. The radio station WFMU published a blog post, backdated to January 14, 2005, which detailed the fictional band's history and presented í rokk as if it were a real obscure and hard-to-find album. Perfect Sound Forever also published an article, backdated to February 2006, with included a purported interview with Kasvot Växt band member Georg Guomundrson.

The band used different equipment than usual to fit the aesthetic of the show, including guitarist Trey Anastasio's use of an Ed O'Brien Sustainer Stratocaster in place of his usual Languedoc hollow-body guitar.

Phish's four MGM Grand concerts, including the Halloween show featuring the Kasvot Växt performance, were livestreamed in 4K resolution, which marked the first time that a major musical act had ever offered a 4K livestreaming option.

=== Fictional history of í rokk ===
According to the fictional material prepared for the Halloween show, Kasvot Växt was formed in the early 1980s by members Georg Guomundrson, Horst Guomundurson, Jules Haugen, and Cleif Jårvinen while they were participating in a scientific research project in Greenland called Niu Teningur, or the Nine Cubes. They recorded í rokk in Stavanger, Norway and released the album on Elektrisk Tung, a private press record label that closed in 1985 with its owner discarding of his remaining copies of í rokk in a fjord. The album became a cult favorite with European record collectors in the mid-1980s after it was circulated on bootleg cassette tapes. The LP itself was described as extremely rare, and WFMU claimed to have a copy in the 1980s which was later stolen from its studio. Perfect Sound Forever writer Jason Gross described í rokk as similar to the music of French progressive rock band Magma, whose lyrics were written in a language of their own invention. "The Ninth Cube" was later used as the location name of Phish's virtual New Year's Eve concert on December 31, 2021. Additionally, the aforementioned Get More Down contains a song named "The 9th Cube".

== Reception and aftermath ==
The performance was received positively by critics. Mike Ayers of Relix wrote, "From start to finish, it’s the band’s best whole collection of songs, perhaps in decades." Scott Bernstein of JamBase wrote that the performance was "One of the most ambitious sets in Phish history" and that the Kasvot Växt songs were "A stunning collection of original music," particularly praising "Say It To Me S.A.N.T.O.S." Andy Cush of Spin described the set as "an extremely well-executed gag from Phish" and described the involvement of publications such as Allmusic and WFMU as helping to make the band's prank convincing because they are "exactly the sort of places that would be genuinely interested in this kind of rock esoterica if it were real".

Following the performance, Phish continued to play the Kasvot Växt songs at their concerts. "Say It to Me S.A.N.T.O.S" has been played at over 50 subsequent concerts since its debut, and "Turtle in the Clouds" and "The Final Hurrah" have also continued to be regularly performed.

== Track listing ==
All tracks are written by Trey Anastasio, Jon Fishman, Mike Gordon, and Page McConnell.

No.	Title	Length
1.	"Turtle in the Clouds"	5:34
2.	"Stray Dog"	4:19
3.	"Everything Is Hollow"	6:14
4.	"We Are Come to Outlive Our Brains"	6:33
5.	"Say It to Me S.A.N.T.O.S."	6:13
6.	"The Final Hurrah"	8:10
7.	"Play by Play"	8:46
8.	"Death Don't Hurt Very Long"	8:33
9.	"Cool Amber and Mercury"	6:36
10.	"Passing Through"	7:27
Total length:		68:25

== Personnel ==
- Trey Anastasio – guitar, vocals
- Mike Gordon – bass, vocals
- Page McConnell – keyboards, piano, vocals, samples (track 6)
- Jon Fishman – drums, vocals
