= Lonely Trip =

Studio album by Trey Anastasio
- Released: July 31, 2020
- Recorded: March–July, 2020
- Studio: Rubber Jungle
- Genre: Lo-fi
- Length: 58:27
- Label: Rubber Jungle Records
- Producer: Bryce Goggin

Trey Anastasio chronology
Ghosts of the Forest (2019)	Lonely Trip (2020)	mercy (2022)

Lonely Trip is the eleventh solo studio album from Trey Anastasio. It was released on July 31, 2020. The album was mixed by Bryce Goggin, and was recorded during the COVID-19 pandemic.

Three tracks from this album - "A Wave of Hope", "Evolve", and the title track, "Lonely Trip" - were re-recorded by Phish for their sixteenth studio album, Evolve, released in July 2024.

== Recording process ==
The album was written during the COVID-19 pandemic, from March–July, 2020. Anastasio stated that the recording process of the album "felt therapeutic to write" and that he "wanted to connect with our community in some way. The unplanned nature of the recording meant I didn't have a lot of gear during this process. I had an electric and an acoustic guitar, a small amp, two microphones, some percussion, and two keyboards, including an old Kurzweil with very realistic drum sounds on it. Everything was recorded through a Spire 8-track. Lonely Trip is truly a raw, low-fi recording." Anastasio stated that Lonely Trip was "my message in a bottle during this time, and I wish I knew how to properly thank all of you in our community for listening and responding. It meant so much to me. Thank you. Wishing all of you much love and safety during this turbulent time." Anastasio also dedicated the album to the heroism of our healthcare and essential workers. Phish member Jon Fishman plays drums on the album; as stated by Anastasio "For the previous few Phish albums (including Kasvot Vaxt and Sigma Oasis), I had been experimenting with writing songs, starting with drum beats that I had sung into my phone. Fish and I would go into the studio and record the beats exactly as I had sung them, with Fish launching off in his unique way after a minute or two. I used these beats as building blocks to many of the songs on Lonely Trip, and it explains how I could do a whole album in Rubber Jungle with such good sounding drums."

== Track listing ==
No.	Title	Length
1.	"Shaking Someone's Outstretched Hand"	2:43
2.	"A Wave of Hope"	3:37
3.	"I Never Left Home"	2:35
4.	"Lost in the Pack"	3:08
5.	"If I Could See the World"	3:07
6.	"The Greater Good"	3:05
7.	"When the Words Go Away"	2:49
8.	"Lotus"	10:29
9.	"I Never Needed You Like This Before"	2:34
10.	"The Silver Light"	3:17
11.	"Are You There Colleen"	2:27
12.	"...And Flew Away"	7:52
13.	"Till We Meet Again"	3:46
14.	"Evolve"	3:44
15.	"Lonely Trip"	3:14
Total length:		58:27

== Personnel ==
- Trey Anastasio – guitar, keyboards, bass
- Jon Fishman – drums
- Bryce Goggin – mixing
