= Get More Down =

Studio album by Phish (as Sci-Fi Soldier)
- Released: October 31, 2022
- Genre: Rock
- Length: 31:38
- Label: JEMP
- Producer: Bryce Goggin; Sci-Fi Soldier

Phish chronology
| LP on LP 03 (2022) | Get More Down (2022) | The Gorge '98 (2022) |

Get More Down is an album by Vermont-based jam band Phish, released under the alter-ego "Sci-Fi Soldier". It was released for streaming and download on October 31, 2022 and contains the twelve songs debuted during the band's Halloween concert the previous year. Continuing their tradition of a "musical costume" during the second set of each Halloween concert, this show saw Phish perform as the band Sci-Fi Soldier, a futuristic, superhero-themed group, complete with costumes and alternate instruments to fit the theme. Get More Down features studio recordings of these songs, some of which have entered the band's setlists in later shows.

== Background ==
=== Musical costumes ===
Since 1994, Phish have carried out a tradition of a "musical costume" occurring in the second set in every one of their Halloween shows. While these sets started off as containing full covers of classic albums by other acts (such as The Who's Quadrophenia in 1995 and The Rolling Stones' Exile on Main St. in 2009), the band has experimented with the format in recent years. Examples include the 2013 concert, which featured songs from their then-upcoming studio album Fuego (tentatively referred to as Wingsuit), and the following year's show in which they "covered" the 1962 Disney spoken word album Chilling, Thrilling Sounds of the Haunted House, playing new instrumental compositions interspersed with excerpts from the original album.

The 2018 show saw the band claim to cover a long-lost progressive rock album, í rokk by a fictional Scandinavian band named Kasvot Växt. In actuality, this was yet another full album's worth of new songs by the group. These performances were later released as a standalone live album on streaming services the following November. "Sci-Fi Soldier" shares similarities with this performance, both of them having elaborate stage setups, costumes, and backstories for their respective fictional acts.

=== 2021 Halloween Show ===
Before the band's 2021 Halloween concert, fans were handed comic book-style playbills containing a fictional backstory of Sci-Fi Soldier upon entering the venue. It depicted the group as futuristic superheroes, with a backstory containing references to past Phish events (such as the "Kasvot Växt" concert) and lyrics. The band members adopted alter-egos for the performance, using the names "Clueless Wallob" (Trey Anastasio), "Half-Nelson" (Mike Gordon), "Paulie Roots" (Jon Fishman), and "Pat Malone" (Page McConnell). Additionally, Anastasio and Gordon strayed from their typical instruments to match the performance's aesthetic.

== Track listing ==
All tracks are written by Trey Anastasio, Jon Fishman, Mike Gordon and Page McConnell.

Get More Down track listing
| No. | Title | Lead vocals | Length |
|---|---|---|---|
| 1. | "Knuckle Bone Broth Avenue" | Anastasio with Fishman, Gordon and McConnell | 3:39 |
| 2. | "Get More Down" | Anastasio with Fishman, Gordon and McConnell | 3:26 |
| 3. | "Egg in a Hole" | Anastasio with Fishman and McConnell | 3:26 |
| 4. | "Thanksgiving" | Fishman | 0:49 |
| 5. | "Clear Your Mind" | Anastasio, Fishman, Gordon, McConnell | 4:54 |
| 6. | "The 9th Cube" | instrumental | 0:51 |
| 7. | "The Inner Reaches of Outer" | Anastasio, Gordon, McConnell | 2:15 |
| 8. | "Don't Doubt Me" | Anastasio with Fishman and Gordon | 3:05 |
| 9. | "The Unwinding" | Anastasio | 0:58 |
| 10. | "Something Living Here" | Anastasio, Gordon | 2:31 |
| 11. | "The Howling" | Anastasio | 3:25 |
| 12. | "I Am in Miami" | Gordon and Fishman with Anastasio and McConnell | 2:13 |

== Personnel ==
- Trey Anastasio (as Clueless Wallob) – guitar, vocals
- Mike Gordon (as Half-Nelson) – bass, vocals
- Jon Fishman (as Paulie Roots) — drums, vocals
- Page McConnell (as Pat Malone) – keyboards, vocals
