= Amsterdam (Phish album) =

Live album by Phish
- Released: June 16, 2015
- Recorded: February 17, 1997; July 1, 1997; July 2, 1997
- Venues: Paradiso, Amsterdam, Netherlands
- Genre: Rock
- Label: JEMP
- Producer: Phish

Phish chronology
Fuego (2014)	Amsterdam (2015)	Big Boat (2016)

Amsterdam is a live album by the rock band Phish. It contains three complete concerts on eight CDs. It was recorded on February 17, 1997, and July 1 and 2, 1997, at the Paradiso in Amsterdam, Netherlands. Packaged as a box set, it was released by JEMP Records on June 16, 2015.

== Track listing ==
Disc one
February 17, 1997 – first set:

1. "Soul Shakedown Party" (Marley) – 4:49
2. "Divided Sky" (Anastasio) – 13:32
3. "Wilson" (Anastasio, Marshall, Woolf) – 4:44
4. "My Soul" (Chenier) – 5:13
5. "Guyute" (Anastasio, Marshall) – 10:13
6. "Timber" (White) – 7:05
7. "Billy Breathes" (Anastasio) – 6:56
8. "Llama" (Anastasio) – 4:02
9. "Bathtub Gin" (Anastasio, Goodman) – 13:03
10. "Golgi Apparatus" (Anastasio, Marshall, Szuter, Woolf) – 4:57

Disc two
February 17, 1997 – second set:

1. "The Squirming Coil" (Anastasio, Marshall) – 10:17
2. "Down with Disease" (Anastasio, Marshall) – 18:18
3. "Carini" (Anastasio, Fishman, Gordon, McConnell) – 21:26
4. "Taste" (Anastasio, Fishman, Gordon, Marshall, McConnell) – 6:34
5. "Down with Disease" (Anastasio, Marshall) – 1:24
6. "Suzy Greenberg" (Anastasio, Pollak) – 6:19
7. "Prince Caspian" (Anastasio, Marshall) – 8:17

Disc three
February 17, 1997 – encore:

1. "Sleeping Monkey" (Anastasio, Marshall) – 5:56
2. "Rocky Top" (Bryant, Bryant) – 3:01

July 1, 1997 – first set:

3. "Ghost" (Anastasio, Marshall) – 22:26
4. "Horn" (Anastasio, Marshall) – 4:06
5. "Ya Mar" (Ferguson) – 10:00

Disc four
July 1, 1997 – first set (cont.):

1. "Limb by Limb" (Anastasio, Herman, Marshall) – 12:43
2. "Ain’t Love Funny" (Cale) – 4:44
3. "Saw It Again" (Anastasio, Marshall) – 7:08
4. "Dirt" (Anastasio, Herman, Marshall) – 4:29
5. "Reba" (Anastasio) – 17:21
6. "Dogs Stole Things" (Anastasio, Marshall) – 5:25

Disc five
July 1, 1997 – second set:

1. "Fish Keyboard Jam" (Anastasio, Fishman, Gordon, McConnell) – 3:18
2. "Timber" (White) – 8:16
3. "Bathtub Gin" (Anastasio, Goodman) – 14:32
4. "Cities" (Byrne) – 24:37
5. "Loving Cup" (Jagger, Richards) – 6:07
6. "Slave to the Traffic Light" (Abrahams, Anastasio, Pollak) – 12:29

July 1, 1997 – encore:

7. "When the Circus Comes" (Hidalgo, Pérez) – 5:27

Disc six
July 2, 1997 – first set:

1. "Mike's Song" (Gordon) – 10:15
2. "Simple" (Gordon) – 12:03
3. "Maze" (Anastasio, Marshall) – 13:49
4. "Strange Design" (Anastasio, Marshall) – 3:21
5. "Ginseng Sullivan" (Blake) – 3:25
6. "Vultures" (Anastasio, Herman, Marshall) – 6:18
7. "Water in the Sky" (Anastasio, Marshall) – 2:47
8. "Weekapaug Groove" (Anastasio, Fishman, Gordon, McConnell) – 13:39

Disc seven
July 2, 1997 – second set:

1. "Stash" (Anastasio, Marshall) – 30:47
2. "Llama" (Anastasio) – 5:39
3. "Wormtown Jam" (Anastasio, Fishman, Gordon, McConnell) – 7:15
4. "Wading in the Velvet Sea" (Anastasio, Marshall) – 8:15

Disc eight
July 2, 1997 – encore:

1. "Free" (Anastasio, Marshall) – 12:45

July 2, 1997 – second encore:

2. "David Bowie" (Anastasio) – 16:11

== Personnel ==
Phish

- Trey Anastasio – guitar, lead vocals, co-lead vocals on "Taste"
- Page McConnell – keyboards, backing vocals, lead vocals on "Strange Design" and "Wading in the Velvet Sea"
- Mike Gordon – bass, backing vocals, lead vocals on "Rocky Top", "Ya Mar", "Ain't Love Funny", "Mike's Song" and "Ginseng Sullivan"
- Jon Fishman – drums, backing vocals, co-lead vocals on "Taste", keyboards on "Fish Keyboard Jam"

Production

- Produced by Phish
