= The Baker's Dozen (residency) =

Concert series performed by Phish

The Baker's Dozen was a series of thirteen concerts performed by Vermont-based jam band Phish between July 21 and August 6, 2017 at Madison Square Garden in New York, New York. Each night featured a completely unique setlist with no songs repeated throughout the event, with the band playing 237 songs in total. The full set of shows was released as a box set entitled The Complete Baker's Dozen, alongside a three-disc live album of highlights, The Baker's Dozen: Live at Madison Square Garden.

== Background ==
Phish had planned to perform a Baker's Dozen themed concert series since before their 2004 breakup. Keyboardist Page McConnell told Relix in 2007 that the original plan was to hold 13 concerts at either Madison Square Garden or the Dunkin' Donuts Center in Providence, Rhode Island. McConnell said the reason the shows were not held when originally planned because, "Even if creatively it made sense to the four of us, the management – I don't want to say they wouldn’t let us do it, but really, they just wouldn't let us do it."

Phish announced the Baker's Dozen shows on their website on January 31st, 2017, and held the residency at the conclusion of their Summer Tour, following shows in Chicago, Dayton, and Pittsburgh.

Each night of the residency was themed around a different variety of doughnut – and this played into the band's song selection for that night. Examples include their performance of Junior Senior's "Shake Your Coconuts" on the opening "coconut" night and covering The Velvet Underground (with "Sunday Morning") on the "red velvet" night, both of which were debuts.

Each show also featured a special doughnut served each night to the audience by Federal Donuts of Philadelphia.

Arguably the most well-received night of the run was July 25, the "jam-filled" night, which had extended improvisation on songs that typically did not feature them, the most infamous of which being a 30-minute version of "Lawn Boy", a track which usually does not exceed four minutes. During the "Boston Cream" night on August 5, the band performed a medley of songs by the bands Boston and Cream.

== The Complete Baker's Dozen ==
The Complete Baker's Dozen

Box set by Phish
- Released: November 30, 2018
- Recorded: July 21–August 6, 2017
- Venues: Madison Square Garden, New York, New York
- Genre: Jam band
- Label: JEMP
- Producer: Phish

Phish chronology
Kasvot Växt: í rokk (2018)	The Complete Baker's Dozen (2018)	The Baker's Dozen: Live at Madison Square Garden (2018)

A box set of all thirteen shows was released as The Complete Baker's Dozen as a limited release on November 30, 2018.

=== Track listing ===
Extended content

==== July 21 – Coconut ====
Disc one

Set I:

1. "Shake Your Coconuts" (Jesper Mortensen) – 3:54
2. "Martian Monster" (Trey Anastasio, Jon Fishman, Mike Gordon, Page McConnell) – 6:02 →
3. "Timber" (Josh White, Sam Gary) – 8:25 →
4. "555" (Gordon, Scott Murawski) – 6:36
5. "Pigtail" (Anastasio, Tom Marshall) – 8:37
6. "Halfway to the Moon" (McConnell) – 9:06
7. "Reba" (Anastasio) – 12:53
8. "Moonage Daydream" (David Bowie) – 6:07
9. "Walls of the Cave" (Anastasio, Marshall) – 11:47

Disc two

Set II:

1. "Tweezer" (Anastasio, Fishman, Gordon, McConnell) – 16:01 →
2. "Seven Below" (Anastasio, Marshall) – 13:14 →
3. "Billy Breathes" (Anastasio) – 5:24
4. "Sparkle" (Anastasio, Marshall) – 4:09
5. "Everything's Right" (Anastasio, Marshall) – 11:41 →
6. "Slave to the Traffic Light" (Anastasio, Dave Abrahamas, Steve Pollak) – 9:24 →
7. "Suzy Greenberg" (Anastasio, Pollak) – 8:06
8. "Coconut" (Harry Nilsson) – 2:50

Disc three

Encore:

1. "The Mango Song" (Anastasio) – 8:11
2. "Good Times Bad Times" (Jimmy Page, John Paul Jones, John Bonham, Robert Plant) – 5:49

==== July 22 – Strawberry ====
Disc four

Set I:

1. "Strawberry Fields Forever" (John Lennon, Paul McCartney) – 4:55
2. "Halley's Comet" (Richard Wright) – 6:23 →
3. "The Moma Dance" (Anastasio, Fishman, Gordon, McConnell, Marshall) – 17:30 →
4. "Breath and Burning" (Anastasio) – 10:07 →
5. "Funky Bitch" (Son Seals) – 7:09
6. "Mound" (Gordon) – 6:12
7. "Foam" (Anastasio) – 8:49
8. "Roggae" (Anastasio, Foshman, Gordon, McConnell, Marshall) – 10:39

Disc five

Set I, continued:

1. "The Squirming Coil" (Anastasio, Marshall) – 11:14

Set II:

2. "Down with Disease" (Anastasio, Marshall) – 19:02 →
3. "Strawberry Letter 23" (Shuggie Otis) – 5:21 →
4. "Birds of a Feather" (Anastasio, Fishman, Gordon, McConnell, Marshall) – 6:29
5. "I Always Wanted it This Way" (McConnell) – 10:01 →
6. "All of These Dreams" (Anastasio, Marshall, Herman) – 4:08
7. "Split Open and Melt" (Anastasio) – 11:18 →
8. "Down with Disease" (Anastasio, Marshall) – 7:04 →
9. "Shine a Light" (Mick Jagger, Keith Richards) – 5:03

Disc six

Encore:

1. "Peaches en Regalia" (Frank Zappa) – 3:33
2. "Cities" (David Byrne) – 4:45
3. "My Sweet One" (Fishman) – 3:53

==== July 23 – Red Velvet ====
Disc seven

Set I:

1. "Sunday Morning" (Lou Reed, John Cale) – 5:35
2. "Axilla" (Anastasio, Marshall, Herman) – 3:27
3. "Your Pet Cat" (Anastasio, Fishman, Gordon, McConnell) – 5:32 →
4. "Back on the Train" (Anastasio, Marshall) – 10:50
5. "How Many People Are You" (Gordon, Murawski) – 9:30
6. "Glide" (Anastasio, Fishman, Gordon, McConnell, Marshall) – 4:43 →
7. "Theme from the Bottom" (Anastasio, Fishman, Gordon, McConnell, Marshall) – 9:26 →
8. "It's Ice" (Anastasio, Marshall) – 15:08 →
9. "More" (Anastasio) – 7:41

Disc eight

Set II:

1. "AC/DC Bag" (Anastasio) – 7:39 →
2. "Wolfman's Brother" (Anastasio, Fishman, Gordon, McConnell, Marshall) – 14:54 →
3. "Twist" (Anastasio, Marshall) – 16:04 →
4. "Waves" (Anastasio, Marshall, Herman) – 11:11 →
5. "Miss You" (Anastasio) – 7:37
6. "Boogie On Reggae Woman" (Stevie Wonder) – 7:50
7. "Wading in the Velvet Sea" (Anastasio, Marshall) – 8:38

Encore:

8. "Sweet Jane" (Reed) – 5:46

==== July 25 – Jam Filled ====
Disc nine

Set I:

1. "Sample in a Jar" (Anastasio, Marshall) – 10:49
2. "Lawn Boy" (Anastasio, Marshall) – 30:02 →
3. "My Friend, My Friend" (Anastasio, Marshall) – 11:31 →
4. "Stash" (Anastasio, Marshall) – 11:28
5. "Bathtub Gin" (Anastasio, Sue Goodman) – 13:06

Disc ten

Set II:

1. "Fuego" (Anastasio, Fishman, Gordon, McConnell) – 19:36 →
2. "Thread" (Anastasio, Marshall) – 6:35 →
3. "Crosseyed and Painless" (Byrne, Brian Eno, Chris Frantz, Jerry Harrison, Tina Weymouth) – 33:07 →
4. "Makisupa Policeman" (Anastasio, Marshall) – 4:09 →
5. "End of Session" (Anastasio, Fishman, Gordon, McConnell, Marshall) – 7:00 →
6. "Tuesday" (Anastasio, Brendan O'Brien) – 5:21
7. "Cavern" (Anastasio, Marshall) – 5:21

Disc eleven

Encore:

1. "Julius" (Anastasio, Marshall) – 9:04 →
2. "Lawn Boy" (Anastasio, Marshall) – 1:56

==== July 26 – Powdered ====
Disc twelve

Set I:

1. "White Winter Hymnal" (Robin Pecknold) – 3:57
2. "Cars Trucks Buses" (McConnell) – 6:11
3. "My Soul" (Clifton Chenier) – 7:00
4. "Roses are Free" (Aaron Freeman, Mickey Melchiondo) – 5:30 →
5. "The Very Long Fuse" (Anastasio, Fishman, Gordon, McConnell) – 7:59 →
6. "Gumbo" (Anastasio, Fishman) – 7:58
7. "Yarmouth Road" (Gordon, Murawski) – 7:25
8. "Pebbles and Marbles" (Anastasio, Marshall) – 10:44
9. "Farmhouse" (Anastasio, Marshall) – 7:44
10. "Tube" (Anastasio, Fishman) – 14:30

Disc thirteen

Set II:

1. "Carini" (Anastasio, Fishman, Gordon, McConnell) – 16:32 →
2. "Mr. Completely" (Anastasio) – 13:54 →
3. "1999" (Prince) – 14:38 →
4. "Steam" (Anastasio, Marshall) – 13:38 →
5. "No Quarter" (Jones, Page, Plant) – 6:47
6. "Character Zero" (Anastasio, Marshall) – 10:40

Disc fourteen

Encore:

1. "Powderfinger" (Neil Young) – 7:08

==== July 28 – Double Chocolate ====
Disc fifteen

Set I:

1. "Chocolate Rain" (Tay Zonday) – 3:35
2. "Ass Handed" (Fishman) – 1:08
3. "Free" (Anastasio, Marshall) – 11:12
4. "Weigh" (Gordon) – 5:21 →
5. "Undermind" (Anastasio, Marshall, Herman) – 8:54 →
6. "The Oh Kee Pa Ceremony" (Anastasio) – 1:58
7. "The Dogs" (Anastasio, Fishman, Gordon, McConnell) – 5:47
8. "Destiny Unbound" (Gordon) – 7:50
9. "The Divided Sky" (Anastasio) – 17:00
10. "Things People Do" (McConnell) – 4:17
11. "Sand" (Anastasio, Marshall, Russ Lawton, Tony Markellis) – 11:43

Disc sixteen

Set II:

1. "Have Mercy" (Lloyd Ferguson, Fitzroy Simpson, Donald Shaw, Joseph Hoo Kim) – 6:22
2. "Chalk Dust Torture" (Anastasio, Marshall) – 24:24
3. "You Sexy Thing" (Errol Brown, Tony Wilson) – 10:52 →
4. "Mercury" (Anastasio, Marshall) – 13:16 →
5. "You Sexy Thing" (Brown, Wilson) – 3:09 →
6. "Backwards Down the Number Line" (Anastasio, Marshall) – 9:33
7. "Rock & Roll" (Reed) – 7:49

Disc seventeen

Encore:

1. "Fee" (Anastasio) – 7:28
2. "Space Oddity" (Bowie) – 5:18

==== July 29 – Cinnamon ====
Disc eighteen

Set I:

1. "Llama" (Anastasio) – 6:08
2. "Wilson" (Anastasio, Marshall, Aaron Woolf) – 9:11 →
3. "Stealing Time from the Faulty Plan" (Anastasio, Marshall) – 8:25
4. "Ya Mar" (Cyril Ferguson) – 9:48
5. "Tela" (Anastasio) – 7:21
6. "The Birds" (Anastasio, Fishman, Gordon, McConnell) – 4:20 →
7. "The Line" (Anastasio, Fishman, Gordon, McConnell) – 7:13
8. "Water in the Sky" (Anastasio, Marshall) – 4:48
9. "Vultures" (Anastasio, Marshall, Herman) – 7:32 →
10. "Train Song" (Gordon, Joseph Linitz) – 2:53 →
11. "Horn" (Anastasio, Marshall) – 3:48
12. "I Am the Walrus" (Lennon, McCartney) – 7:08

Disc nineteen

Set II:

1. "Blaze On" (Anastasio, Marshall) – 23:44 →
2. "Twenty Years Later" (Anastasio, Marshall) – 11:10 →
3. "Alumni Blues" (Anastasio) – 3:32 →
4. "Letter to Jimmy Page" (Anastasio) – 1:21 →
5. "Alumni Blues" (Anastasio) – 3:09
6. "Meatstick" (Anastasio, Fishman, Gordon, McConnell, Marshall, Herman) – 9:56 →
7. "Dirt" (Anastasio, Marshall, Herman) – 4:35 →
8. "Harry Hood" (Anastasio, Fishman, Gordon, McConnell, Long) – 17:48

Encore:

9. "Cinnamon Girl" (Young) – 4:43

==== July 30 – Jimmies ====
Disc twenty

Set I:

1. "The Curtain With" (Anastasio, Marc Daubert) – 14:10 →
2. "Runaway Jim" (Anastasio, Abrahams) – 10:37
3. "Waking Up Dead" (Gordon, Murawski) – 7:04
4. "Esther" (Anastasio) – 9:42

Disc twenty-one

Set I, continued:

1. "Home" (McConnell) – 9:04
2. "Brian and Robert" (Anastasio, Marshall) – 3:19
3. "Nellie Kane" (Tim O'Brien) – 3:09
4. "Colonel Forbin's Ascent" (Anastasio) – 5:43 →
5. "Fly Famous Mockingbird" (Anastasio) – 7:52 →
6. "David Bowie" (Anastasio) – 11:48

Disc twenty-two

Set II:

1. "Drowned" (Pete Townshend) – 21:47 →
2. "A Song I Heard the Ocean Sing" (Anastasio, Marshall) – 18:12
3. "Harpua" (Anastasio, Fishman) – 17:17 →
4. "2001" (Richard Strauss) – 8:29 →
5. "Golgi Apparatus" (Anastasio, Woolf, Bob Szuter, Marshall) – 5:51
6. "In the Good Old Summertime" (George Evans, Ren Shields) – 3:58

Encore:

7. "The Wind Cries Mary" (Jimi Hendrix) – 3:56

==== August 1 – Maple ====
Disc twenty-three

Set I:

1. "O Canada" (Calixa Lavallée, Adolphe-Basile Routhier, Robert Stanley Weir) – 2:42 →
2. "Crowd Control" (Anastasio, Marshall) – 5:34
3. "Sugar Shack" (Gordon) – 6:28
4. "When the Circus Comes" (David Hidalgo, Louie Pérez) – 5:25
5. "Daniel Saw the Stone" (traditional) – 3:44
6. "Army of One" (McConnell) – 4:47
7. "The Wedge" (Anastasio, Marshall) – 7:33
8. "Guelah Papyrus" (Anastasio, Marshall) – 4:25
9. "Maple Leaf Rag" (Scott Joplin) – 0:39
10. "Guelah Papyrus" (Anastasio, Marshall) – 1:30
11. "McGrupp and the Watchful Hosemasters" (Anastasio, Marshall) – 8:23
12. "Limb by Limb" (Anastasio, Marshall, Herman) – 9:14 →
13. "Walk Away" (Joe Walsh) – 7:23

Disc twenty-four

Set II:

1. "Golden Age" (Kyp Malone, David Andrew Sitek) – 20:39
2. "Leaves" (Anastasio, Marshall) – 9:19
3. "Swept Away" (Anastasio, Marshall) – 0:56 →
4. "Steep" (Anastasio, Fishman, Gordon, McConnell, Marshall) – 12:37 →
5. "46 Days" (Anastasio) – 12:07
6. "Piper" (Anastasio, Marshall) – 12:59 →
7. "Possum" (Jeff Holdsworth) – 10:35

Disc twenty-five

Encore:

1. "Rock 'n' Roll Suicide" (Bowie) – 4:03

==== August 2 – Holes ====
Disc twenty-six

Set I:

1. "Way Down in the Hole" (Tom Waits) – 5:08
2. "Buried Alive" (Anastasio) – 3:38
3. "Kill Devil Falls" (Anastasio, Marshall) – 9:35
4. "Guyute" (Anastasio, Marshall) – 11:26
5. "I Didn't Know" (Wright) – 4:14
6. "NICU" (Anastasio, Marshall) – 5:46

Disc twenty-seven

Set I, continued:

1. "Meat" (Anastasio, Fishman, Gordon, McConnell, Marshall) – 9:41 →
2. "Maze" (Anastasio, Marshall) – 10:40
3. "Ginseng Sullivan" (Norman Blake) – 3:18
4. "Waiting All Night" (Anastasio, Fishman, Gordon, McConnell) – 6:25
5. "Heavy Things" (Anastasio, Marshall, Herman) – 6:06
6. "Run Like an Antelope" (Anastasio, Marshall, Pollak) – 11:32

Disc twenty-eight

Set II:

1. "Mike's Song" (Gordon) – 22:15 →
2. "O Holy Night" (Adolphe Adam) – 3:01 →
3. "Taste" (Anastasio, Fishman, Gordon, McConnell, Marshall) – 18:32 →
4. "Wingsuit" (Anastasio, Fishman, Gordon, McConnell) – 11:01 →
5. "Sneakin' Sally Through the Alley" (Allen Toussaint) – 6:56 →
6. "Weekapaug Groove" (Anastasio, Fishman, Gordon, McConnell) – 10:30

Encore:

7. "A Day in the Life" (Lennon, McCartney) – 5:57

==== August 4 – Lemon ====
Disc twenty-nine

Set I:

1. "See That My Grave is Kept Clean" (Blind Lemon Jefferson) – 6:45
2. "Punch You in the Eye" (Anastasio) – 8:22 →
3. "Party Time" (Fishman) – 8:41
4. "Big Black Furry Creature from Mars" (Gordon) – 4:45
5. "Dinner and a Movie" (Anastasio, Pollak) – 3:47
6. "Ocelot" (Anastasio, Marshall) – 9:30
7. "Poor Heart" (Gordon) – 2:44
8. "Winterqueen" (Anastasio, Marshall) – 9:43
9. "Bold as Love" (Hendrix) – 6:03 →
10. "First Tube" (Anastasio, Lawton, Markellis) – 10:47

Disc thirty

Set II:

1. "Dem Bones" (James Weldon Johnson, J. Rosamond Johnson) – 3:03
2. "No Men in No Man's Land" (Anastasio, Marshall) – 13:48
3. "Everything in its Right Place" (Colin Greenwood, Jonny Greenwood, Ed O'Brien, Philip Selway, Thom Yorke) – 7:09
4. "What's the Use?" (Anastasio, Fishman, Gordon, McConnell) – 6:41
5. "Scents and Subtle Sounds" (Anastasio, Marshall, Herman) – 16:34
6. "Prince Caspian" (Anastasio, Marshall) – 10:05
7. "Fluffhead" (Anastasio, Pollak) – 17:43

Disc thirty-one

Encore:

1. "Frankenstein" (Edgar Winter) – 8:12

==== August 5 – Boston Cream ====
Disc thirty-two

Set I:

1. "Soul Shakedown Party" (Bob Marley) – 6:11
2. "Uncle Pen" (Bill Monroe) – 4:42
3. "The Sloth" (Anastasio, Marshall) – 4:05
4. "Gotta Jibboo" (Anastasio, Lawton, Markellis) – 14:09
5. "Fuck Your Face" (Gordon) – 3:05
6. "Sunshine of Your Feeling" (Jack Bruce, Eric Clapton, Tom Scholz) – 6:51
7. "Frost" (Anastasio, Marshall) – 6:19 →
8. "Scent of a Mule" (Gordon) – 10:29
9. "Fire" (Hendrix) – 4:10
10. "Alaska" (Anastasio, Marshall) – 8:07 →
11. "Plasma" (Anastasio, Marshall, Herman) – 10:50

Disc thirty-three

Set II:

1. "Ghost" (Anastasio, Marshall) – 21:10 →
2. "Petrichor" (Anastasio) – 16:48 →
3. "Light" (Anastasio, Marshall) – 12:53 →
4. "The Lizards" (Anastasio) – 10:43
5. "The Horse" (Anastasio, Marshall) – 1:03 →
6. "Silent in the Morning" (Anastasio, Marshall) – 5:04 →
7. "Quinn the Eskimo" (Bob Dylan) – 5:44 →
8. "Rocky Top" (Felice Bryant, Boudleaux Bryant) – 3:24

Disc thirty-four

Encore:

1. "Joy" (Anastasio, Marshall) – 7:14

==== August 6 – Glazed ====
Disc thirty-five

Set I:

1. "Dogs Stole Things" (Anastasio, Marshall) – 6:09
2. "Rift" (Anastasio, Marshall) – 6:25
3. "Ha Ha Ha" (Fishman) – 1:37 →
4. "Camel Walk" (Holdsworth) – 6:18
5. "Crazy Sometimes" (Gordon, Murawski) – 7:41 →
6. "Saw it Again" (Anastasio, Marshall) – 6:05 →
7. "Sanity" (Anastasio, Fishman, Gordon, McConnell, Pollak) – 5:32 →
8. "Bouncing Around the Room" (Anastasio, Marshall) – 4:01
9. "Most Events Aren't Planned" (Russell Batiste Jr., Oteil Burbridge, Sofi Dillof, McConnell) – 11:38
10. "Bug" (Anastasio, Marshall) – 7:06
11. "I Been Around" (McConnell) – 3:49
12. "Izabella" (Hendrix) – 6:39

Disc thirty-six

Set II:

1. "Simple" (Gordon) – 26:04 →
2. "Rise/Come Together" (Anastasio, Gary Nicholson, Kenny Greenberg) – 7:24
3. "Starman" (Bowie) – 5:31
4. "You Enjoy Myself" (Anastasio) – 23:59
5. "Loving Cup" (Jagger, Richards) – 8:11

Encore:

6. "On the Road Again" (Willie Nelson) – 2:29 →
7. "Lawn Boy Reprise" (Anastasio, Marshall) – 1:31
8. "Bass Solo" (Gordon) – 0:30
9. "Tweezer Reprise" (Anastasio, Fishman, Gordon, McConnell) – 4:08

== The Baker's Dozen: Live at Madison Square Garden ==
The Baker's Dozen: Live at Madison Square Garden

Live album by Phish
- Released: November 30, 2018
- Recorded: July 21–August 6, 2017
- Venues: Madison Square Garden, New York, New York
- Genre: Jam band
- Length: 204:07
- Label: JEMP
- Producer: Phish

Phish chronology
The Complete Baker's Dozen (2018)	The Baker's Dozen: Live at Madison Square Garden (2018)	Sigma Oasis (2020)

The Baker's Dozen: Live at Madison Square Garden is an album collecting highlights from the entire run. It was released on November 30, 2018 as a triple CD and six-disc LP.

=== Track listing ===
Disc one

1. "Blaze On" (Trey Anastasio, Tom Marshall) – 23:35
  - July 29 – Cinnamon
2. "Roggae" (Anastasio, Jon Fishman, Mike Gordon, Page McConnell, Marshall) – 10:31
  - July 22 – Strawberry
3. "Simple" (Gordon) – 25:10
  - August 6 – Glazed
4. "More" (Anastasio) – 7:38
  - July 23 – Red Velvet

Disc two

1. "Twist" (Anastasio, Marshall) – 20:50
  - July 23 – Red Velvet
2. "Waves" (Anastasio, Marshall, Scott Herman) – 11:05
  - July 23 – Red Velvet
3. "Everything's Right" (Anastasio, Marshall) – 11:30
  - July 21 – Coconut
4. "Chalk Dust Torture" (Anastasio, Marshall) – 24:06
  - July 28 – Double Chocolate
5. "Miss You" (Anastasio) – 7:28
  - July 23 – Red Velvet

Disc three

1. "No Men in No Man's Land" (Anastasio, Marshall) – 13:45
  - August 4 – Lemon
2. "Scents and Subtle Sounds" (Anastasio, Marshall, Herman) – 16:31
  - August 4 – Lemon
3. "Ghost" (Anastasio, Marshall) – 20:45
  - August 5 – Boston Cream
4. "Most Events Aren't Planned" (Russell Batiste Jr., Oteil Burbridge, Sofi Dillof, McConnell) – 11:13
  - August 6 – Glazed

== Personnel ==
- Trey Anastasio – guitar, lead vocals (on all songs with vocals except where noted), acapella vocals on "Strawberry Fields Forever", "White Winter Hymnal", "Chocolate Rain", "Space Oddity", "In the Good Old Summer Time", "O Holy Night", and "Dem Bones", marimba lumba on "I Always Wanted It This Way" and "46 Days", narration on "Fly Famous Mockingbird" and "Harpua".
- Mike Gordon – bass, backing vocals, lead vocals on "555", "Funky Bitch", "Mound", "How Many People Are You", "Yarmouth Road", "Weigh", "Destiny Unbound", "You Sexy Thing", "Ya Mar", "Train Song", "Waking Up Dead", "Nellie Kane", "Drowned", "Sugar Shack", "Ginseng Sullivan", "Mike's Song", "Big Black Furry Creature from Mars", "Poor Heart", "Uncle Pen", "Fuck Your Face", "Scent of a Mule", "Rocky Top", "Crazy Sometimes", and "Starman", acapella vocals on "Strawberry Fields Forever", "White Winter Hymnal", "Chocolate Rain", "Space Oddity", "In the Good Old Summer Time", "O Holy Night", and "Dem Bones", co-lead vocals on "My Sweet One", "1999", and "Everything In Its Right Place", narration on "Harpua", percussion on "46 Days".
- Jon Fishman – drums, backing vocals, acapella vocals on "Strawberry Fields Forever", "White Winter Hymnal", "Chocolate Rain", "Space Oddity", "In the Good Old Summer Time", "O Holy Night", and "Dem Bones" co-lead vocals on "The Moma Dance", and "Everything In Its Right Place" lead vocals on "Sunday Morning", "Crosseyed and Painless", and "Ass Handed", narration on "Harpua", vacuum cleaner on "I Didn't Know".
- Page McConnell – keyboards, piano, backing vocals, lead vocals on "Halfway to the Moon", "I Always Wanted It This Way", "It's Ice", "Wading in the Velvet Sea", "Sweet Jane", "Lawn Boy", "No Quarter", "Things People Do", "Rock and Roll", "Tela", "Home", "Army of One", "Walk Away", "Bold as Love", "Silent in the Morning", "Most Events Aren't Planned", and "I Been Around", co-lead vocals on "Seven Below", "My Sweet One", "1999", "A Day in the Life", and "Everything In Its Right Place", acapella vocals on "Strawberry Fields Forever", "White Winter Hymnal", "Chocolate Rain", "Space Oddity", "In the Good Old Summer Time", "O Holy Night", and "Dem Bones", keytar on "Lawn Boy" and "Frankenstein", MIDI controller on "Chocolate Rain", narration on "Harpua", percussion on "46 Days", theremin on "Simple".
