= Orpheum Theater (St. Louis) =

- American Theater
- U.S. National Register of Historic Places
- St. Louis Landmark
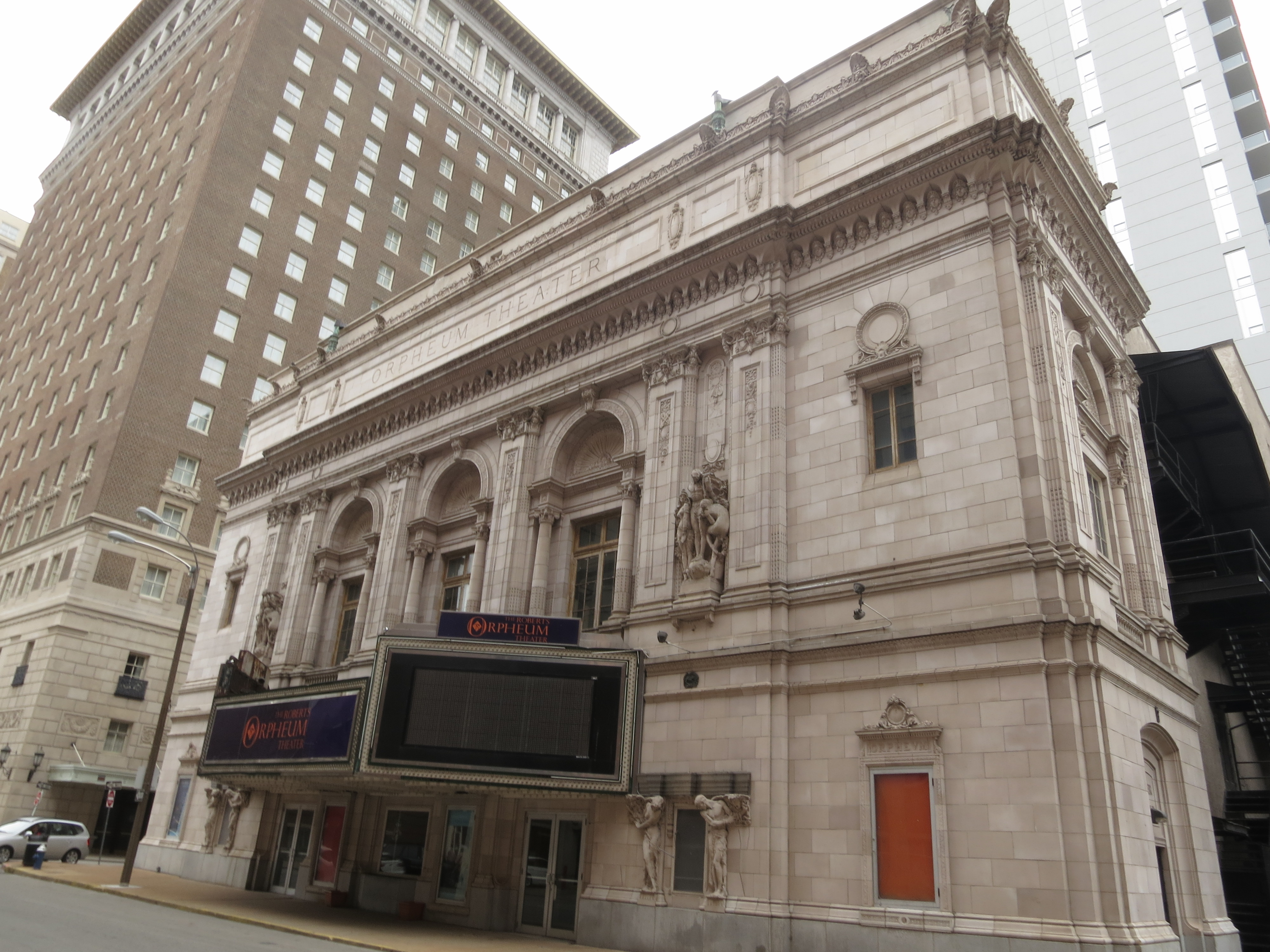

- Location within St. Louis Location within Missouri Location within the United States
- Location: 416 N. 9th St., St. Louis, Missouri
- Coordinates: 38°37′48″N 90°11′34″W
- Built: 1917
- Architect: Lansburgh, G. Albert
- Architectural style: Beaux Arts
- NRHP reference No.: 85000617
- Added to NRHP: March 18, 1985

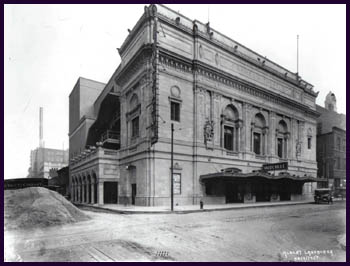
The Orpheum Theater in 1917

The Orpheum Theater in St. Louis, Missouri, is a Beaux Arts-style theater built in 1917. It was constructed by local self-made millionaire Louis A. Cella and designed by architect Albert Lansburgh. The $500,000 theater opened on Labor Day 1917 as a vaudeville house. As vaudeville declined, it was sold to Warner Brothers in 1930, and served as a movie theater until it closed in the 1960s.

In the 1970s, the theater was restored and renamed to American Theater and was listed under that name on the National Register of Historic Places in 1985. In 1993, the rock band Phish played two concerts at the venue - one in April and the other in August - both of which were released in full on the band's 2017 live album St. Louis '93. The theater was later sold to local businessmen Michael and Steve Roberts, who renamed it the Roberts Orpheum Theater. The Roberts brothers sold the theater in 2012, and it closed. The Chicago developer, UrbanStreet Group, plans to restore the theater.

== History ==
The theater was closed in 2012. However, new owners, Jubilee Group, purchased the building in 2017.
