= Mercy (Trey Anastasio album) =

Studio album by Trey Anastasio
- Released: March 11, 2022
- Genre: Folk
- Length: 33:28
- Label: Rubber Jungle
- Producer: Bryce Goggin; Robert Stevenson

Trey Anastasio chronology
Lonely Trip (2020)	Mercy (2022)	January (2023)

Mercy is the twelfth studio album by guitarist and songwriter Trey Anastasio, released on March 11, 2022. It is his first fully acoustic album and was produced by Bryce Goggin and Robert Stevenson.

Two songs from this album - "Hey Stranger" and "Mercy" - were re-recorded by Phish for their sixteenth studio album, Evolve, released in July 2024.

== Background ==
Mercy is Anastasio's second album recorded during the COVID-19 pandemic, after 2020's Lonely Trip, and is seen as a companion to that album. He has said that he intends to implement the songs on the album into Phish's repertoire in the near future.

Anastasio felt that the songs needed to be heard in sparse arrangements, saying in the liner notes:

It’s two years since we went into hiding. This is still going on, and it’s an even lonelier trip… Here I was, still at home, playing acoustic guitar. I thought, “These songs just want to be one guy with a guitar, singing.”

On the album, Anastasio used a custom-made acoustic guitar by Adam Buchwald of Circle Strings commissioned by Phish keyboardist Page McConnell as a birthday gift. Some songs on the album include more than one guitar part, overlaid on top of an existing part, with Anastasio explaining:

The decision was made very quickly: "Let me double the guitar." I was listening to the first take on headphones and playing off it. It was like jamming with myself.

== Track listing ==
All tracks are written by Trey Anastasio.

Mercy track listing
No.	Title	Length
1.	"A Little More Time"	3:39
2.	"Mercy"	4:27
3.	"Flying Blind"	3:07
4.	"Blazing Down the Twisted Wire"	3:41
5.	"6 1/2 Minutes"	3:54
6.	"Roll Like a River"	4:32
7.	"Hey Stranger"	3:33
8.	"Arc"	3:45
9.	"Ever Changing Tide"	2:50
Total length:		33:28

== Personnel ==
- Trey Anastasio – all instruments and vocals
