= St. Louis '93 =

Live album by Phish
- Released: March 31, 2017
- Recorded: April 14 and August 16, 1993
- Venue: American Theater, St. Louis
- Genre: Rock
- Label: JEMP
- Producer: Phish

Phish chronology
Big Boat (2016)	St. Louis '93 (2017)	Kasvot Växt: í rokk (2018)

St. Louis '93 is a six-disc live album by the rock band Phish. It includes two complete concerts, recorded on April 14, 1993 and August 16, 1993.

Phish's 1993 tour in support of their fourth studio album, Rift, saw the band play colleges and theaters. St. Louis '93 includes the band's first stop at the American Theater that year, April 14, dubbed the "Roger Proposal" show when Trey Anastasio's friend Roger Holloway opened Set II by proposing to his girlfriend onstage.

Phish returned to the American on August 16. Jams connected many of the songs. The show finished with a quartet of covers, including Duke Ellington's "Take the "A" Train", Led Zeppelin's "Good Times Bad Times", "Amazing Grace", and Felice and Boudleaux Bryant's country standard "Rocky Top".

== Track listing ==
Disc one

April 14, 1993 – Set I:

1. "Buried Alive" (Trey Anastasio) – 2:37 →
2. "Poor Heart" (Mike Gordon) – 2:27
3. "Maze" (Anastasio, Tom Marshall) – 9:33
4. "Bouncing Around the Room" (Anastasio, Marshall) – 3:38
5. "It's Ice" (Anastasio, Marshall) — 8:07 →
6. "Stash" (Anastasio, Marshall) – 10:22 →
7. "Kung" (Jon Fishman) – 3:50 →
8. "Stash" (Anastasio, Marshall) – 1:34 →
9. "Kung" (Fishman) – 2:11 →
10. "The Horse" (Anastasio, Marshall) – 2:27 →
11. "Silent in the Morning" (Anastasio, Marshall) – 5:05 →
12. "Divided Sky" (Anastasio) – 14:51
13. "I Didn't Know" (Richard Wright) – 3:48
14. "Golgi Apparatus" (Anastasio, Marshall, Bob Szuter, Aaron Woolf) – 4:45

Disc two

April 14, 1993 – Set II:

1. "Roger's Proposal" (Roger Holloway) – 2:26
2. "AC/DC Bag" (Anastasio) – 6:00 →
3. "My Sweet One" (Fishman) – 2:03 →
4. "Tweezer" (Anastasio, Fishman, Gordon, Page McConnell) – 12:43 →
5. "Mound" (Gordon) – 5:44
6. "Big Ball Jam" (Anastasio, Fishman, Gordon, McConnell) – 2:42
7. "You Enjoy Myself" (Anastasio) – 13:34 →
8. "Spooky" (Buddy Buie, James B. Cobb, Jr., Harry Middlebrooks, Jr., Mike Shapiro) – 1:58 →
9. "You Enjoy Myself" (Anastasio) – 10:43

Disc three

April 14, 1993 – Set II, continued:

1. "Harpua" (Anastasio, Fishman) – 15:49 →
2. "Runaway Jim" (Dave Abrahams, Anastasio) – 7:49

April 14, 1993 – Encore:

3. "Lengthwise" (Fishman) – 1:38 →
4. "Contact" (Gordon) – 6:08 →
5. "Tweezer Reprise" (Anastasio, Fishman, Gordon, McConnell) – 3:36

Disc four

August 16, 1993 – Set I:

1. "Axilla" (Anastasio, Scott Herman, Marshall) – 3:26 →
2. "Possum" (Jeff Holdsworth) – 13:09 →
3. "Horn" (Anastasio, Marshall) – 4:16 →
4. "Reba" (Anastasio) – 19:26 →
5. "Sparkle" (Anastasio, Marshall) – 3:56

Disc five

August 16, 1993 – Set I, continued:

1. "Foam" (Anastasio) – 11:49
2. "I Didn't Know" (Wright) – 5:51
3. "Split Open and Melt" (Anastasio) — 12:15
4. "The Squirming Coil" (Anastasio, Herman, Marshall) – 10:50

Disc six

August 16, 1993 – Set II:

1. "Mike's Song" (Gordon) – 13:34 →
2. "Faht" (Fishman) – 2:41 →
3. "Weekapaug Groove" (Anastasio, Fishman, Gordon, McConnell) – 15:45
4. "Mound" (Gordon) – 5:50 →
5. "It’s Ice" (Anastasio, Marshall) – 8:43 →
6. "My Friend, My Friend" (Anastasio, Marshall) – 7:00
7. "Poor Heart" (Gordon) – 2:24
8. "Big Ball Jam" (Anastasio, Fishman, Gordon, McConnell) – 2:48
9. "Take the 'A' Train" (Billy Strayhorn) – 4:42 →
10. "Good Times Bad Times" (Jimmy Page, John Paul Jones, John Bonham, Robert Plant) – 6:16

August 16, 1993 – Encore:

11. "Amazing Grace" (traditional) – 2:29
12. "Rocky Top" – (Felice Bryant, Boudleaux Bryant) – 2:45

== Personnel ==
Phish

- Trey Anastasio – guitar, lead vocals, backing vocals, acoustic guitar on "The Horse" and "My Friend, My Friend", acapella vocals on "Amazing Grace"
- Jon Fishman – drums, backing vocals, washboard on "I Didn't Know" (both versions), acoustic guitar on "Faht", acapella vocals on "Amazing Grace"
- Mike Gordon – bass, backing vocals, lead vocals on "Poor Heart", "Possum", "Mound" and "Mike's Song", acapella vocals on "Amazing Grace"
- Page McConnell – keyboards, backing vocals, lead vocals on "Silent in the Morning", "Spooky" and "It's Ice", acapella vocals on "Amazing Grace"

Production

- Recorded by Paul Languedoc
- Mastered by Fred Kevorkian at Kevorkian Mastering
- Post-Production by Kevin Shapiro
- Technical Assistance by Ben Collette
- Illustrations/Design by Dan Mumford
- Art Direction by Julia Mordaunt
- Phish Inc is Beth Montuori Rowles, Kevin Shapiro, Julia Mordaunt, Ben Collette
- Management by Coran Capshaw for Red Light Management with Jason Colton and Patrick Jordan
- Business management by Burton Goldstein & Co., LLC: Burton Goldstein, Danyael Brand and Valerie Erbstein
- 1993 management by Dionysian Productions: John Paluska, Shelly Culbertson

1993 Summer and Fall touring crew

Andrew Fischbeck, Paul Languedoc, Chris Kuroda, Peter Schall, Stuart Weissman, Brad Sands, Mark Vincent, Bob Neumann, Amy Skelton, Marley, Mike Hayes, Mike Frelone, Grant McAree, Dave Lawler, Paul Charette, Larry Frazer, Don Townshend, Rob Cane, Ron Morley
