= Karina Rykman =

American singer-songwriter

- Born
- Origin: New York City
- Genres: Jam rock, indie pop
- Occupation: Singer-songwriter
- Instruments: Vocals, bass
- Years active: 2018-present

Karina Rykman (born Karina Rajchman) is an indie/jam rock singer-songwriter, bassist, and guitarist from New York.

== Early life ==
Karina Rykman grew up in New York City, the daughter of two Columbia professors with specialties in philosophy, French, and art history. Her father is philosopher John Rajchman, and her grandfather is Jan A. Rajchman, a Polish-American computer scientist. Her father introduced her to classical music such as Bach's Goldberg Variations, rather than rock and roll.

While attending the Upper West Side's Calhoun School, she became obsessed with rock music after learning to play the White Stripes' "Seven Nation Army" on an acoustic guitar in the 8th grade.

At age 13, she started her first band, False Arrest, playing shows at the Knitting Factory, Don Hills, and various New York City nightclubs. She then went on to play in many local bands throughout high school. She graduated from NYU's Gallatin School of Individualized Study in 2016, with a concentration in "Invention and Distribution in Contemporary Music".

== Music career ==
By the time Rykman was a teenager, she had landed several high-profile gigs which included America's Got Talent and backing up pop star Julia Michaels on The Today Show. As a teen, Rykman played in the indie-rock band The Sound of Urchin.

While studying at Tomato's House Of Rock, a School Of Rock afterschool program, she drew the attention of Ween bassist Dave Dreiwitz who would ask her to play guitar in his power trio, Crescent Moon. Later, when Dreiwitz had to step away as bass player in pianist Marco Benevento's band due to Ween's comeback, he recommended Rykman as the obvious replacement. Rykman replaced Dreiwitz in Marco Benevento's band in 2016 and has been a fixture in the band since.

In 2019, she wrote and recorded her first original song, "Plants". Before she had two singles to her name, Rykman had already opened for bands such as Khruangbin and Guster. Her repertoire and her audience grew organically from there, recording and self-releasing several singles while playing headlining shows and many summer festivals.

While playing at the Peach Music Festival in 2021, she re-connected with Phish guitarist Trey Anastasio. The guitarist, whom she had originally met while in middle school with his daughters, offered to produce her debut album Joyride. The album was recorded at The Barn where many Phish albums were written and recorded.

Rykman has appeared on Late Night with Seth Meyers on multiple occasions while serving as a substitute guitarist for the 8G Band.

In April 2024, Rykman opened for the rock band My Morning Jacket in Detroit, joining the band on stage for Radiohead's “The National Anthem“. Rykman has recorded a cover of an early Billie Eilish track, “Ocean Eyes”, with rock band The Gaslight Anthem.

== Discography ==
=== Albums ===
- Late Checkout (Independent - High Rotation Records, September 27, 2026)
- Joyride (Independent, August 18, 2023)
