= Mehdi Ghadyanloo =

Iranian artist

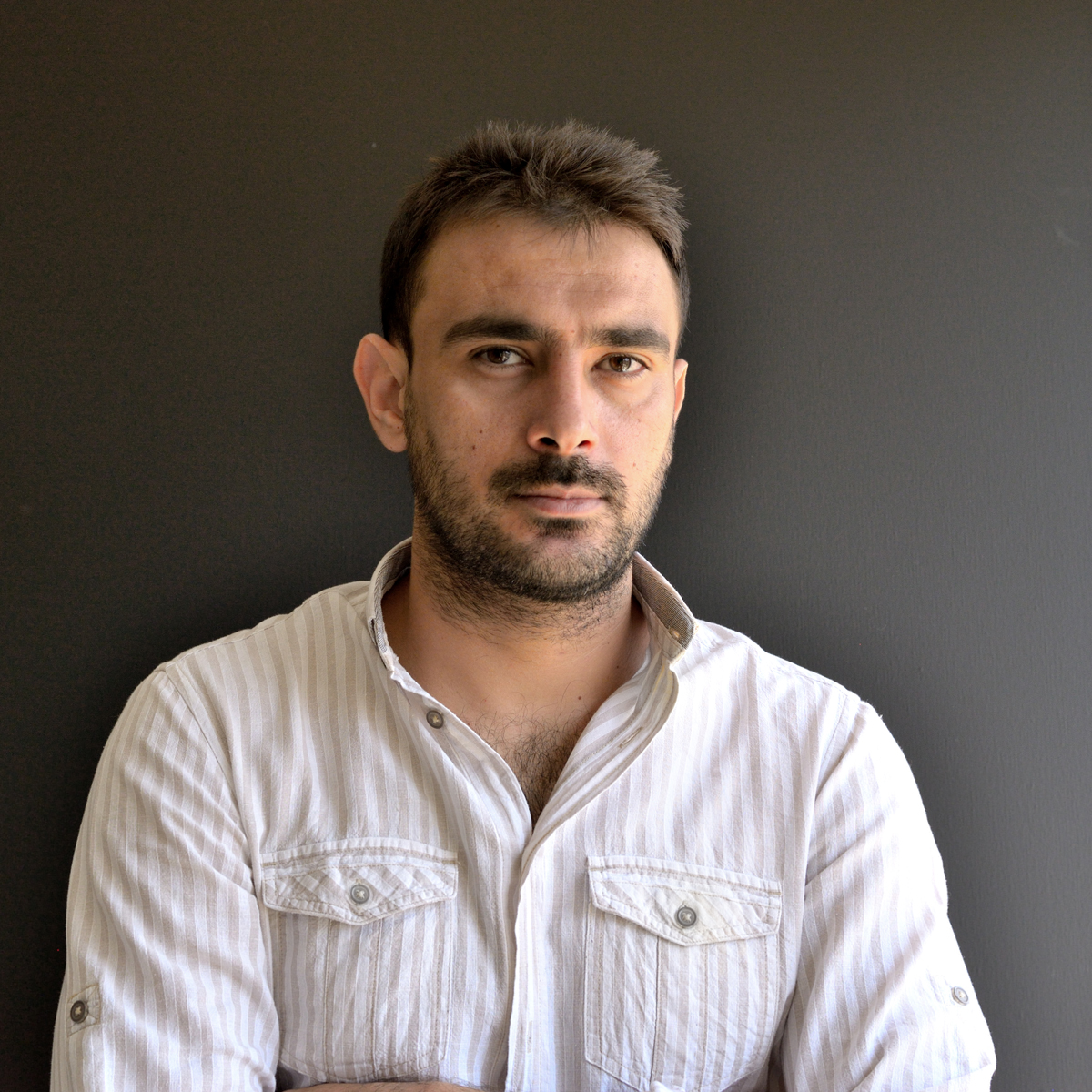
- Born: 1981 (age 44–45); Karaj, Iran
- Education: University of Tehran; Tarbiat Modares University
- Style: Trompe-l'œil; Surrealism
- Website: www.mehdighadyanloo.com

Mehdi Ghadyanloo (born 1981 in Karaj, Iran) is an Iranian artist, painter, and muralist. Known for his gigantic trompe-l'œil-style murals in central Tehran, Ghadyanloo has become the most prolific Iranian public artist with over 100 murals across the globe in the USA, the UK, Russia and his native Iran. Ghadyanloo also creates paintings, with surreal and minimalistic themes. While his colourful commissioned mural works have led to him being simplistically coined as Iran’s answer to Banksy by the press, Ghadyanloo is more inclined to draw comparisons with European surrealist painters such as Magritte, Girgio de Chirico and the minimal lines of modernist 20th century architects such as Le Corbusier. Mehdi takes his inspirations of Giorgio de Chirico, Magritte, and the minimalism of Le Corbusier, and turns them into a voice all of his own.

== Early life and education ==
Ghadyanloo was born in Karaj, Iran (a suburb of Tehran) in 1981. His father was a farmer and his mother a carpet weaver. He grew up during the Iran–Iraq War in which his father served as a soldier. Until age 18, Ghadyanloo lived and worked on his family's farm in Karaj.

He enrolled in the University of Tehran, studying painting in the university's Fine Arts faculty. He graduated from the university in 2004. He later earned a master's degree in animation from Tarbiat Modares University.

He gained a wider public attention after he was commissioned by the Ministry of Beautification of Iran to paint walls around the capital Tehran. From 2004 to 2011, he had done more than hundred painted wall pieces that are both loved by the public and citizens and art critics and curators. His work attracted the interest of the international press, international galleries, and received public commissions for murals. He has painted murals at Kings Cross in 2016; the Rose Fitzgerald Kennedy Greenway in 2016; Dewey Square, Boston. In March 2017, he had the first exhibition in two years entitled Spaces of Hope in the Howard Griffin Gallery, London.

== Career ==
In 2006, Ghadyanloo responded to an open call for submissions from Tehran's Bureau of Beautification. He submitted concepts which the Bureau approved, and he then began painting murals throughout the city.

By 2014, Ghadyanloo had painted over 100 murals on formerly blank walls in Tehran and the murals that he created employed tromp l’oeil techniques.

In early 2015, he held his first exhibition in Britain entitled Perception at the Howard Griffin Gallery in London which proved so popular that all the canvases sold out before the exhibition opened. He also painted several murals in the city, including one in Shoreditch.

In March 2017 Ghadyanloo staged the exhibition "Space of Hope" in London at the 14,000 square foot Ambika P3. The paintings in the exhibition were compared to those of Le Corbusier. Same year in October, Ghadyanloo became the first Iranian artist to be commissioned in both Iran and the US since the revolution in 1979, when he completed a major public commission for the Rose Kennedy Greenway project in Boston, US. A mural emblazoned across a 5,230 sq. ft. wall opposite the city’s South Station. "

In 2018, joined by a small team of muralists from his hometown, he completed Rebuilding the Sky in Almetyevsk, Russia, in similar style to his perspective-challenging and illusion-based works in Tehran. Ghadyanloo wanted to add joyfulness and color to the concrete look of the city. Around the same time, he also painted a piece titled The Fraud and Hope on the rooftop of the OK Center for Contemporary Art in Linz, Austria, which depicts a huge water swirl and a gaping black hole. The piece was created as commentary on the issue of the global warming, melting ice, and the role of water, but also references migration crises and the artist’s personal phobias.

In 2019 he was commissioned by World Economic forum to design and paint a large-scale painting titled Finding Hope specifically for 2019 World Economic Forum Annual Meeting. The cover of the 2024 Phish album Evolve features a painting by Ghadyanloo.

== Exhibitions ==
- 2020. The Armory Show. Dastan's Basement, Booth P16. New York, USA
- 2019. Portals of Light, Galleri Golsa, Oslo
- 2018. Undercurrents, Howard Griffin Gallery, Basel
- 2017. Remembering the Oblivion, Rod Bianco, Oslo
- 2017. Spaces of Hope, Howard Griffin Gallery, London
- 2015. Perception, Howard Griffin Gallery, London
- 2014. Mirage of Redemption, Gallery GEO, Bergen
