= Paul Wenzel =

American artist (1935–2022)

- Born: Paul Edward Wenzel; February 14, 1935; Chicago, Illinois, U.S.
- Died: May 27, 2022 (aged 87); Prescott, Arizona, U.S.
- Employer: The Walt Disney Company
- Notable work: Walt Disney stamp, Mary Poppins movie poster
- Title: artist, illustrator
- Website: Paul Wenzel

Paul Edward Wenzel (February 14, 1935 – May 27, 2022) was an American artist, best known for his career with The Walt Disney Company, creating illustrations for movie posters and retail merchandise.

== Career ==
Wenzel first began at Disney in 1958, working for the studio for 42 years, creating thousands of illustrations for movies and consumer products. Wenzel worked on over 100 movie posters during his tenure as a designer/illustrator for the Motion Picture Advertising Department, including the Academy Award winning Mary Poppins; re-releases of Pinocchio and Song of the South; The Parent Trap; Herbie Goes Bananas; Gus; The Monkey's Uncle; The Misadventures of Merlin Jones; The Horse in the Gray Flannel Suit; Moon Pilot; Summer Magic; Pete's Dragon; Dragonslayer; The Black Cauldron; and The Fox and the Hound. Wenzel created concept paintings for Primeval World as part of Walt Disney's Ford Motor Company Magic Skyway attraction at the 1964–1965 New York World's Fair. Wenzel created concept art of The Haunted Mansion that would later become the cover of the 1964 Disneyland Records album Chilling, Thrilling Sounds of the Haunted House. Wenzel also designed nearly a dozen Disney Company Christmas cards. Wenzel became Disney Consumer Products first Art Director for their creative publishing team, and in 1985, Paul was made Creative Director of Character Art, supervising over 25 artists.

=== Walt Disney commemorative stamp ===
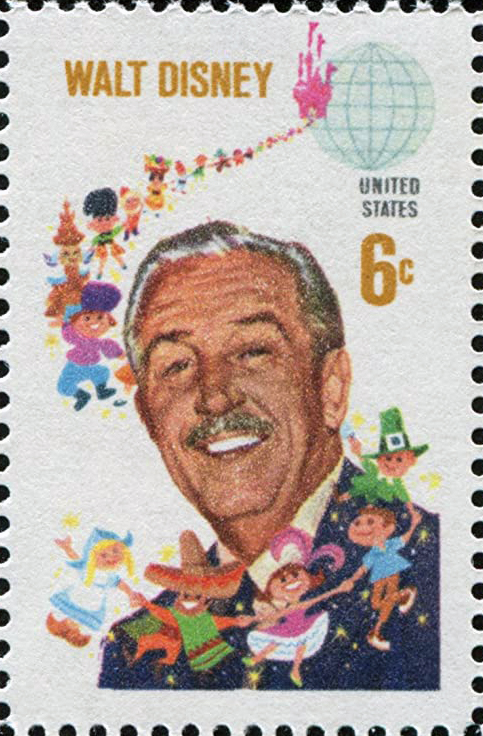
1968 U.S. Walt Disney commemorative postage stamp. Wenzel painted the portrait, and C. Robert Moore designed the stamp.

Wenzel's most famous work is the Walt Disney portrait made, after Disney's passing in 1966, for a 6-cent commemorative stamp issued in the United States on September 11, 1968. The stamp represents Walt Disney with a line of It's A Small World styled children coming out of a silhouette of Disneyland's Sleeping Beauty Castle on the edge of a sphere. The portrait was illustrated by Wenzel while the children and the castle were made by Bob Moore. During the first 10 days that the Disney stamp was on sale throughout the United States, more than 150 million copies were sold, making the Disney stamp one of the most popular and successful issues in United States history.

=== Other work and retirement ===
Throughout the 1960s Wenzel was also an illustrator for science-fiction magazines creating covers and interior art for titles such as Space Travel; Galaxy Science Fiction; Worlds of Tomorrow; Fantastic Stories of Imagination; and if. In 2000, Wenzel retired from Disney to reside in Prescott, Arizona and pursue his fine art paintings of animals and American Indians. His work is exhibited by the Mountain Spirit Gallery.

Wenzel died at his home in Prescott, Arizona, on May 27, 2022.
