= Sigma Oasis =

Studio album by Phish
- Released: April 2, 2020
- Recorded: November 2019
- Studio: The Barn, Chittenden County, Vermont; Sputnik Sound, Nashville, Tennessee; Brighter Shade Studios, Atlanta, Georgia; Flux Studio, New York City
- Genre: Rock; progressive rock; psychedelic rock; jam
- Length: 66:15
- Label: JEMP
- Producer: Phish, Vance Powell

Phish chronology
| The Baker's Dozen: Live at Madison Square Garden (2018) | Sigma Oasis (2020) | LP on LP 01 (2021) |

Sigma Oasis is the fifteenth studio album by the American rock band Phish, released on the band's JEMP Records label on April 2, 2020. The album was recorded at their studio The Barn and was produced by the band and Vance Powell.

== Production ==
Sigma Oasis was recorded over the course of one week in November 2019 at The Barn, the band's Vermont recording studio. The album was mixed at Sputnik Sound in Nashville. The album's cover is a photograph of the band members standing on the porch of The Barn, and was taken by photographer Rene Huemer. Most of the album was recorded and tracked live at The Barn, although keyboardist Page McConnell later recorded synthesizer overdubs and guitarist Trey Anastasio recorded backing vocal and percussion overdubs after the sessions but before the final mix process.

All nine songs on the album had been performed by Phish in concert prior to the release of the album. The songs were first performed between 2015 and 2019, with the exception of "Steam", which debuted in 2011. "Mercury" and "Shade" were both recorded for the band's 2016 album Big Boat, but did not make that album's final track listing, with the appearance of the former having been vetoed by producer Bob Ezrin. The title track for Sigma Oasis was debuted by the Trey Anastasio Band in the summer of 2018, and was first performed by Phish in December 2019. Sigma Oasis is the first Phish record since Farmhouse to only feature songwriting contributions from guitarist Trey Anastasio and lyricists Tom Marshall and Scott Herman.

== Release ==
Phish did not plan to release Sigma Oasis in April 2020, but decided to move up the release date due to the COVID-19 pandemic; In a statement, the band wrote "When we recorded the album, we didn't plan to release it this way. But today, because of the environment we're all in, it just feels right. We don't know the next time that we're all going to be able to be together. This is an opportunity to have a moment where the Phish community can share something despite being physically separated."

Sigma Oasis was announced by the band on March 31, 2020 during their "Dinner and a Movie" livestream, a free weekly video broadcast of older Phish concerts the band had been offering during the pandemic. The album was premiered the next day, in a listening party simulcast on the LivePhish website, SiriusXM's Phish Radio station and the band's Facebook page. Sigma Oasis was then released for streaming and purchase at midnight on April 2.

The album received a physical release on vinyl and compact disc on November 27, 2020.

== Critical reception ==
Professional ratings
Review scores
| Source | Rating |
|---|---|
| AllMusic | 4/5 stars |
| Pitchfork | 6.5/10 |

In Pitchfork, critic Sam Sodomsky praised Sigma Oasis for showcasing the band's improvisational jamming, which is a cornerstone of their live performances but rarely appears on their studio records. Sodomsky called the album "a pleasant surprise, a small joy, an unlikely course correction," compared to its predecessor Big Boat.

On Allmusic, critic Stephen Thomas Erlewine wrote that Sigma Oasis sounded "Unified and relaxed, the rare Phish studio set that feels as effortless as a Phish concert."

On PopMatters, Greg Schwartz wrote that Sigma Oasis was a "vibrant and uplifting album for the fanbase in their hour of collective spiritual need", referring to the subsequent cancelation of the band's summer 2020 tour due to the COVID-19 pandemic.

== Track listing ==
Sigma Oasis track listing
| No. | Title | Writer(s) | Length |
|---|---|---|---|
| 1. | "Sigma Oasis" | Trey Anastasio; Tom Marshall; Scott Herman | 5:50 |
| 2. | "Leaves" | Anastasio; Marshall | 7:03 |
| 3. | "Everything's Right" | Anastasio; Marshall | 12:22 |
| 4. | "Mercury" | Anastasio; Marshall | 7:31 |
| 5. | "Shade" | Anastasio; Marshall | 4:25 |
| 6. | "Evening Song" | Anastasio; Marshall; Herman | 3:21 |
| 7. | "Steam" | Anastasio; Marshall | 7:53 |
| 8. | "A Life Beyond the Dream" | Anastasio | 6:31 |
| 9. | "Thread" | Anastasio; Marshall | 11:19 |
| Total length: | | | 66:15 |

== Personnel ==
Phish

- Trey Anastasio – guitars, lead vocals
- Page McConnell – keyboards, backing vocals, co-lead vocals on "Leaves"
- Mike Gordon – bass guitar, backing vocals
- Jon Fishman – drums, backing vocals, marimba on "Mercury"

Additional musicians

- David Davidson – conductor/violin
- David Angell – violin
- Karen Winkelmann – violin
- Kristin Wilkinson – viola
- Conni Ellisor – violin
- Carole Rabinowitz – cello
- Justin Levy – vocals
- Tasha DeNae – vocals
- Jaymee Rodriguez – vocals
- Shaunise Brown – vocals
- Noah Denney – percussion
- Don Hart – string arrangements
- Raab Stevenson – vocal arrangements and production

Production

- Produced by Phish and Vance Powell
- Recorded by Vance Powell, Michael Fahey, Ben Collette, and Jared Slomoff
- Mixed by Vance Powell at Sputnik Sound
- Mix assisted by Michael Fahey
- Mastered by Pete Lyman at Infrasonic Mastering, Nashville TN
- Album Art Design by Julia Mordaunt
- Photography by Rene Huemer

== Charts ==
Chart performance for Sigma Oasis
| Chart (2020) | Peak position |
|---|---|
| US Billboard 200 | 116 |
| US Top Rock Albums (Billboard) | 16 |
