= January (Page McConnell and Trey Anastasio album) =

Studio album by Page McConnell and Trey Anastasio
- Released: March 10, 2023
- Recorded: January 2023
- Studio: Trout Studios (Brooklyn)
- Length: 30:19
- Label: JEMP
- Producer: Bryce Goggin

Page McConnell chronology
Maybe We're the Visitors (2021)	January (2023)

Trey Anastasio chronology
mercy (2022)	January (2023)

Singles from January
- 1. "Dancing in Midair" Released: March 7, 2023

January is a collaborative studio album by Page McConnell and Trey Anastasio, both members of Phish. It was released on March 10, 2023, through JEMP Records, the band's label. Produced by Bryce Goggin, it is McConnell and Anastasio's second collaborative release after 2020's December, an EP consisting of acoustic re-recordings of past Phish songs. The album is a digital-only release. "Dancing in Midair" was released as a single on March 7, 2023.

== Background ==
Anastasio said of the recording process: "We just walked into the studio with literally an acoustic guitar and a couple of synthesizers. Songs are mysterious. They sound different. It was limiting, in a great way."

== Track listing ==
All tracks are written by Page McConnell and Trey Anastasio.

No.	Title	Length
1.	"Euphonic Cocoon"	3:05
2.	"Dancing in Midair"	4:43
3.	"Bell Jar Minutemen"	3:30
4.	"Life Saving Gun"	2:27
5.	"I Strolled"	5:35
6.	"Lunar Nickel"	5:03
7.	"Manometric Flame"	1:33
8.	"Ambrosia Fire"	4:24
Total length:		30:19

== Personnel ==
Credits adapted from liveforlivemusic.com.

- Page McConnell – keyboards, vocals
- Trey Anastasio – guitar, bass, drums, vocals
