= Big Boat =

Studio album by Phish
- Released: October 7, 2016
- Recorded: March–April 2016
- Studios: Nashville, Tennessee; Burlington, Vermont
- Genre: Rock
- Length: 66:00
- Label: JEMP
- Producer: Bob Ezrin

Phish chronology
Amsterdam (2015)	Big Boat (2016)	St. Louis '93 (2017)

Singles from Big Boat
- 1. "Breath and Burning" Released: September 12, 2016; 2. "Blaze On" Released: September 27, 2016

Big Boat is the fourteenth studio album by the American rock band Phish, released on October 7, 2016 on the band's own JEMP Records label. The album was produced by Bob Ezrin and recorded at The Barn, guitarist Trey Anastasio's studio in Burlington, Vermont.

== Critical reception ==
Professional ratings
Review scores
Source	Rating
AllMusic	3.5/5 stars
Consequence of Sound	B−
Pitchfork	5.3 / 10
PopMatters	8/10 stars

On AllMusic, Timothy Monger wrote, "Having reclaimed some of their studio mojo on 2014's critically lauded Fuego, jam institution Phish were more than willing to take another chance with studio legend Bob Ezrin at the helm.... Big Boat arrives a mere two years after Fuego and rides a similar sonic wave with its focus on streamlined songwriting and more concise lyrics. Like many Phish productions, a number of these songs were honed on-stage during tours..."

In Consequence of Sound, Sean Barry said, "To put it simply, it has seemed for decades you were either a Phish fan or you weren't, and there was very little chance for that to change. Recently, though, that line has begun to blur.... Luckily, the band has also released 13 studio albums over their career, and while some may completely write off the idea of listening to Phish in that kind of controlled setting, many of the records provide a convenient gateway for potential fans. For instance, their newest album, Big Boat, is wonderfully accessible thanks to its relatable sense of communal fun, as well as the band's own self-awareness."

On NPR, Mike Katzif wrote, "Outside of that ambitious closing piece ["Petrichor"], Big Boat feels less musically adventurous than many previous Phish records. But its simpler songcraft is purposeful in the way it provides a glimpse inside the heads of Anastasio, McConnell, Gordon and Fishman. After years of revealing itself through flurries of notes, hypnotic grooves and exploratory improvisations that often masked deeper meaning, Phish now seems most engaged when singing from the heart."

On Pitchfork, Sam Sodomsky wrote, "Big Boat is at times overwrought and half-assed, gratingly silly and embarrassingly self-serious, both tedious and underwhelming. In other words, it's a new Phish album. Even still, the lowest points of Big Boat manage to sink lower than just being bad-for-Phish; Big Boat is made even worse by not sounding enough like Phish."

In PopMatters, Chris Ingalls said, "Personally, I feel that the misconceptions surrounding Phish do a disservice to the studio albums, which contain plenty of smart composition and easily digestible tracks for non-fans to appreciate.... Big Boat could easily be perceived as the natural sequel to Fuego, but it works spectacularly well on its own, with Bob Ezrin guiding the band through a variety of song styles from breezy pop to elaborate prog rock. Who knew that Phish could produce one of their most eclectic albums a good three decades into their existence?"

== Track listing ==
Big Boat
No.	Title	Writer(s)	Lead vocals	Length
1.	"Friends"	Jon Fishman	Fishman	3:43
2.	"Breath and Burning"	Trey Anastasio	Anastasio	4:20
3.	"Home"	Page McConnell	McConnell	6:27
4.	"Blaze On"	Anastasio; Tom Marshall	Anastasio	4:20
5.	"Tide Turns"	Anastasio	Anastasio	4:21
6.	"Things People Do"	McConnell	McConnell	1:55
7.	"Waking Up Dead"	Mike Gordon; Scott Murawski	Gordon	4:15
8.	"Running Out of Time"	Anastasio; Marshall	Anastasio	3:32
9.	"No Men in No Man's Land"	Anastasio; Marshall	Anastasio	5:00
10.	"Miss You"	Anastasio	Anastasio	7:02
11.	"I Always Wanted It This Way"	McConnell	McConnell	4:29
12.	"More"	Anastasio	Anastasio	4:22
13.	"Petrichor"	Anastasio	Anastasio	13:33
Total length:				66:00

== Personnel ==
Phish

- Trey Anastasio – guitar, lead vocals
- Page McConnell – keyboards, backing vocals, lead vocals on "Home", "Things People Do" and "I Always Wanted It This Way"
- Mike Gordon – bass, backing vocals, lead vocals on "Waking Up Dead"
- Jon Fishman – drums, backing vocals, lead vocals on "Friends"

Additional musicians

- Chris Bullock: clarinet, bass clarinet, flute
- Gabriel Cabezas: cello on "Petrichor"
- James Casey: tenor and baritone sax on "Breath And Burning", "No Men In No Man’s Land" and "Petrichor"
- Natalie Cressman: trombone on "Breath And Burning", "No Men In No Man’s Land" and "Petrichor"
- Andres Forero: percussion on "Blaze On", "Breath And Burning", "No Men In No Man’s Land", "Miss You" and "Petrichor"
- Jennifer Hartswick: trumpet on "Breath And Burning", "No Men In No Man’s Land" and "Petrichor"
- Rob Moose: violin, viola on "Petrichor"
- Jeff Tanski: additional keyboards on "Petrichor"
- Jim Horn: baritone sax on "Tide Turns"
- Steve Herrman: trumpet on "Tide Turns"
- Scott Dujac: trumpet on "Tide Turns"
- Roy Agee: trombone on "Tide Turns"
- Tyler Summers: alto sax on "Tide Turns"
- Denis Solee: tenor sax on "Tide Turns"

Production

- Produced by Bob Ezrin
- Engineered by Justin Cortelyou and Ben Collette
- Mixed by Justin Cortelyou and Bob Ezrin
- Additional Engineering by Drew Bollman, Bryce Roberts, Elliot Scheiner and Jared Slomoff
- Additional Mixing on "Petrichor" by Ben Collette and Elliot Scheiner
- Assistant Engineers: Justin Francis, Tyler Hartman
- Recorded at: The Barn, VT; Black River Studios, Nashville TN; Anarchy Studios, Nashville, TN; Avatar Studios, New York, NY; Slaight Music Studios, Toronto, Ont.; Megaplum, VT; The Bunker, VT; Rubber Jungle, NY; Starstruck Studios, Nashville, TN
- Petrichor Arranged & Orchestrated by Trey Anastasio
- Horn arrangement on No Men in No Man's Land by Trey Anastasio and Andres Forrero
- Horn arrangement on Breath And Burning by Trey Anastasio
- Horn arrangement on Tide Turns by Leon Pendarvis
- Production Management by Richard Glasgow, Kim Markovchick and Beth Montuori Rowles
- Technical Assistance by Mike Burns, Brian Brown, Kevin Brown, Lee Scott and Derek Zelenka
- Mixed at Anarchy Studios, Nashville, TN
- Mastered by Bob Ludwig at Gateway Mastering Studios, Inc.
- Vinyl lacquer cut by Chris Bellman at Bernie Grundman Mastering
- Photographs from the series Don't Touch Me! by Fang Er, Courtesy of M97 Gallery
- Cover Design & Art Direction by Julia Mordaunt
- Layout by Ryan Corey for Smog Design, Inc.
- Management by Coran Capshaw, Patrick Jordan and Jason Colton for Red Light Management
- Phish Inc. is Beth Montuori Rowles, Julia Mordaunt, Richard Glasgow, Kevin Shapiro and Ben Collette
- Business Management by Burton Goldstein & Co., LLC: Burton Goldstein, Danyael Brand and Valerie Erbstein
- All songs published by Who Is She? Music, Inc. (BMI)

== Charts ==
Chart (2016)	Peak position
US Billboard 200	19
