= Fuego (Phish album) =

2014 studio album by Phish

Studio album by Phish
- Released: June 24, 2014
- Recorded: Late 2013
- Studio: FAME Studios, Muscle Shoals, Alabama; The Barn, Chittenden County, Vermont; Anarchy Studios, Nashville, Tennessee; Boardwalk Hall, Atlantic City, New Jersey
- Genre: Rock
- Length: 54:33
- Label: JEMP
- Producer: Bob Ezrin

Phish chronology
Niagara Falls (2013)	Fuego (2014)	Amsterdam (2015)

Singles from Fuego
- 1. "Waiting All Night" Released: May 14, 2014; 2. "The Line" Released: May 27, 2014; 3. "555" Released: June 12, 2014

Fuego is the thirteenth studio album by the American rock band Phish, released on June 24, 2014, on the band's own JEMP Records label.

The album was the band's first in five years, and features material that the band had debuted at their Halloween concert on October 31, 2013, in Atlantic City, New Jersey.

== Production ==
Fuego was recorded in late 2013 in Nashville, Tennessee after a series of writing sessions at the Barn in Vermont and was produced by Bob Ezrin (Pink Floyd, Lou Reed, Peter Gabriel). While Fuego's ten new tracks include songs that individual members brought to the table in usual Phish fashion, the bulk of the material was written by all four, working together at the Barn, often writing in a stream-of-consciousness style. The song "Fuego" was recorded live during the soundcheck of the band's October 30, 2013 concert at Boardwalk Hall in Atlantic, New Jersey.

In a playful spin on Phish's tradition of musical costumes, the band debuted eight songs from the album on October 31, 2013 as the second set of their Halloween concert at Boardwalk Hall in Atlantic City, New Jersey. The original working title of the album was Wingsuit, but in May 2014 Phish announced that the album would be called Fuego. Ultimately, three songs included in the Halloween performance debut didn't make it onto the studio version: "Snow", "Amidst the Peals of Laughter", and "You Never Know". "Halfway to the Moon" made its live debut in 2010 and "Winterqueen" was debuted by Trey Anastasio Band in 2011, before Phish performed it for the first time at the 2013 Halloween show.

== Singles ==
One track, "Waiting All Night", was released on NPR's website on May 14, 2014, along with a complete track listing of the album. A second song, "The Line", was released online for streaming on May 27, 2014, and a third, "555", was released on YouTube on June 12, 2014. On June 15, 2014, the entire album was made available to the public to stream online on NPR's website as a part of its "First Listen" series.

== Critical reception ==
Professional ratings
Aggregate scores
Source	Rating
Metacritic	71/100
Review scores
Source	Rating
Allmusic	4/5 stars
Consequence of Sound	B−
Rolling Stone	3.5/5 stars

In Rolling Stone, Will Hermes wrote, "Let's say you wanted to write a Phish album in 2014.... Most important, you'd write optimistic songs that can be jammed all the way up to our depleted ozone in concert. Phish do all this on their 12th studio LP — struggling to transform the onstage magic into bits and bytes, and mostly nailing it.... Geek-funk grooves spaz-out merrily, and producer Bob Ezrin keeps it feeling live. Lyrics remain an Achilles' heel, but sometimes Phish hit profundity sideways.... "A hero's what I'm not," Anastasio sings ruefully, before spinning out another set of guitar lines that prove him exactly wrong."

On AllMusic, Fred Thomas said, "Instead of an overblown studio creation, Fuego instead finds the band sounding relaxed and connected, but also distinctly articulate in their often complex twists and turns. More than the smart production, Fuego is a standout in Phish's sometimes less-than-impressive studio catalog on the strengths of its ten stellar tracks, inspired tunes that share a loose thread as they bound between virtuosic playing, flirtations with gospel and funk, and the kind of eclectic rock jamming Phish have made their name on.... With sharp production and some of the better compositions Phish have managed in ages, Fuego ranks among their best studio albums, capturing strands of the frenetic, cartoonish, darkly cautionary, and open-hearted expressions that make their concerts such moving experiences, but which often get lost when the tape starts rolling."

On Consequence of Sound, Jake Cohen wrote, "... we must judge Fuego on its ability to stand alone as a work of studio art. On that merit, it has much to applaud. Phish wisely avoided trying to capture the live experience on wax, instead hiring the well-pedigreed classic rock producer Bob Ezrin (Lou Reed, Pink Floyd, Alice Cooper).... Like the compositions themselves, the brilliance of Ezrin’s work here is in the nuances.... Thankfully, this album's shortcomings are not due to a drying up of creativity or motivation.... Phish wrote most of these songs together, while the basic rhythms and progressions come directly from some of their best recent concert jams. Their democratic approach to composition signals a more mature band, while individual contributions from Gordon and McConnell are some of their strongest to date."

In Mountain Weekly News, Zach Jones said, "For over 30 years, Phish has risen from a college jam band in Vermont to one of the largest touring bands to date. Long heralded as the band that would replace the Grateful Dead, Phish has evolved as much more than a replacement band. They have dealt with their own ups and downs, highs and lows, and came out a much stronger, tighter band, which is evident on their latest release, Fuego."

== Commercial performance ==
The album debuted at number 7 on the Billboard 200 chart, with first-week sales of 32,000 copies in the United States.

== Track listing ==
No.	Title	Writer(s)	Lead vocals	Length
1.	"Fuego"	Trey Anastasio; Jon Fishman; Mike Gordon; Page McConnell	Anastasio; Gordon; McConnell	9:15
2.	"The Line"	Anastasio; Fishman; Gordon; McConnell	Anastasio	5:21
3.	"Devotion to a Dream"	Anastasio; Tom Marshall	Anastasio	5:47
4.	"Halfway to the Moon"	McConnell	McConnell	6:34
5.	"Winterqueen"	Anastasio; Marshall	Anastasio	4:21
6.	"Sing Monica"	Anastasio; Marshall	Anastasio; McConnell	3:13
7.	"555"	Gordon; Scott Murawski	Gordon with Fishman	5:41
8.	"Waiting All Night"	Anastasio; Fishman; Gordon; McConnell	Anastasio; Fishman; Gordon; McConnell	4:58
9.	"Wombat"	Anastasio; Fishman; Gordon; McConnell	Anastasio; Fishman; Gordon; McConnell	3:18
10.	"Wingsuit"	Anastasio; Fishman; Gordon; McConnell	Anastasio	6:05

== Personnel ==
Phish

- Trey Anastasio – guitar, vocals
- Jon Fishman – drums, vocals
- Mike Gordon – bass, vocals
- Page McConnell – keyboards, vocals

Additional musicians

- Horns – Charles Rose, Harvey Thompson, Doug Moffet, Vincent Ciesielski
- Background vocals – Vicki Hampton, Maureen Murphy, Joshua Guillaume, Bob Ezrin, Marie Lewey, Cindy Walker, Carla Russell

Production

- Produced and mixed by Bob Ezrin
- Recording engineers: Justin Cortelyou, John Gifford III
- Mix engineers: Justin Cortelyou, Jarod Snowden
- Additional engineers: Joshua Guillaume, Ben Collette, Kam Lutcherhand, Justin Francis, Jared Slomoff, Garry Brown
- Pre-production engineer: Ben Collette
- Programmer: Reavis Mitchell
- Technical assistance: Mike Burns, Brian Brown, Kevin Brown, Lee Scott
- Production coordinator: Kim Markovchick
- Paintings: Paco Pomet
- Design: Jeri Heiden, Julia Mordaunt
