= Chilling, Thrilling Sounds of the Haunted House =

Studio album by Walt Disney Studios
- Released: 1964, 1973
- Genres: Novelty, sound effects
- Language: English
- Label: Walt Disney Records

Chilling, Thrilling Sounds of the Haunted House is an LP album intended for "older children, teenagers, and adults", released by Disneyland Records (now known as Walt Disney Records). The album was mainly composed of sound effects that had been collected by the sound effects department of Walt Disney Studios. The album was released in several different forms. The album was first released in 1964 in a white sleeve, with a second release in 1973 with an orange sleeve. In both versions, the first side contained 10 stories narrated by Laura Olsher (who had previously done voice work for Mr. Magoo's Christmas Carol, and would go on to narrate other Disneyland record releases such as Learning to Tell Time is Fun and The Little Engine That Could), complete with sound effects. The second side contained 10 sound effects meant for others to create their own stories.

Despite the title, not all the cuts were related to haunted houses or witches or ghostly spirits. Featured were such situations as an ocean liner hitting rocks ("Shipwreck"), a dimwitted lumberjack ("Timber"), a man crossing an unsafe bridge ("The Unsafe Bridge"), someone lighting a stick of dynamite ("The Very Long Fuse") and a spaceship landing on Mars ("The Martian Monsters"). Also, there are tracks with several examples of cats ("Your Pet Cat"), dogs ("The Dogs") and birds ("The Birds"), similar to the soundtrack for Alfred Hitchcock’s film The Birds, becoming enraged for some reason, as well as a skit about Chinese water torture ("Chinese Water Torture").

== Release history ==
The 1964 album became a certified gold record by the RIAA on December 7, 1972.

A 1974 British release appeared with a completely redesigned cover.

Disney released the New Chilling, Thrilling Sounds of the Haunted House in 1979, an updated album with 33 tracks. While containing little to no specific Haunted Mansion content, the new release contained many completely new effects (including sources also used for Looney Tunes productions and Sesame Street). The updated 1979 album was certified gold by the RIAA on April 11, 1988. Excerpts from the 1979 album were included on the CD Halloween Songs & Sounds.

== Art ==
The covers of the American albums featured an image painted with acrylics by Paul Wenzel, which he created as concept art for the attraction The Haunted Mansion. The original was 37" x 39" and was purchased at auction in 2001 for US$3,000. The cover of the British release featured an actual photo of the ride, while the 1979 album simply displayed a colored image of a haunted house, ravens and a skeleton in a coffin.

== Influence and legacy ==
Some of the stories on the album are notable for being sampled in rap songs such as N.W.A's "Quiet on Tha Set," Ice Cube's "Look Who's Burnin'" and "Jackin' for Beats", and Jedi Mind Tricks' "Chinese Water Torture". Xero, precursor to the rock band Linkin Park, sampled "The Very Long Fuse" on their 1997 demo tape.

American rock band Phish performed side one of Chilling, Thrilling Sounds of the Haunted House, with original instrumental music and vocals to accompany the album, on October 31, 2014, as their "musical costume" for the second set of their Halloween show at the MGM Grand in Las Vegas. Following that performance, the band has made their interpretation of several songs a regular part of their concert repertoire. They have performed "Martian Monster" at over 50, "The Dogs" at 19, and "Your Pet Cat" at 20 subsequent concerts. Several other songs have been played fewer than 10 times at Phish concerts.

== Track listing: 1964 version ==
Side One
No.	Title	Length
1.	"The Haunted House"	3:00
2.	"The Very Long Fuse"	1:28
3.	"The Dogs"	1:13
4.	"Timber"	1:45
5.	"Your Pet Cat"	0:49
6.	"Shipwreck"	1:39
7.	"The Unsafe Bridge"	1:21
8.	"Chinese Water Torture"	2:02
9.	"The Birds"	0:46
10.	"The Martian Monsters"	1:41

Side Two
No.	Title	Length
1.	"Screams and Groans"	0:57
2.	"Thunder, Lightning and Rain"	2:01
3.	"Cat Fight"	0:37
4.	"Dogs"	0:48
5.	"A Collection Of Creaks"	1:54
6.	"Fuses and Explosions"	1:11
7.	"A Collection Of Crashes"	0:45
8.	"Birds"	0:33
9.	"Drips and Splashes"	1:18
10.	"Things In Space"	0:53

== Track listing: 1979 version ==
Side One: Frightening Situations
No.	Title	Length
1.	"Night Creatures"	3:05
2.	"Haunted House"	3:20
3.	"The Dungeon"	1:12
4.	"The Witches"	0:46
5.	"Encounter in the Fog"	1:53
6.	"A Grave Matter (The Grave Robbers)"	3:50
7.	"Mad Scientist's Laboratory"	3:40

Side Two: Eerie Sound Effects
No.	Title	Length
1.	"The Elements: Thunder and Lightning"	0:37
2.	"The Elements: The Storm"	1:04
3.	"The Elements: Winds"	1:39
4.	"The Elements: Dripping Cavern"	0:23
5.	"Creatures: Howling Wolves"	0:24
6.	"Creatures: Rats"	0:17
7.	"Creatures: Shrieking Cats"	0:27
8.	"Creatures: Owls"	0:18
9.	"Creatures: Baying Hounds"	0:17
10.	"Creatures: Crickets"	0:33
11.	"Creatures: The Raven"	0:18
12.	"Creatures: Unearthly Monster"	0:29
13.	"Ghosts and Phantoms: Moans and Groans"	0:25
14.	"Ghosts and Phantoms: Laughing Ghost"	0:15
15.	"Ghosts and Phantoms: Cackling Witches"	0:26
16.	"Ghosts and Phantoms: Assorted Screams"	0:23
17.	"Ghosts and Phantoms: Heartbeat"	0:23
18.	"Ghosts and Phantoms: Dragging Footsteps"	0:20
19.	"Frightening Devices: Creaking Doors"	0:23
20.	"Frightening Devices: Rusty Gate"	0:08
21.	"Frightening Devices: Fog Horn"	0:27
22.	"Frightening Devices: Clock Striking Midnight"	0:28
23.	"Frightening Devices: Rattling Chains"	0:41
24.	"Frightening Devices: Laboratory Sounds"	1:11
25.	"Frightening Devices: Tolling Bell"	0:43
26.	"Haunting Music"	3:07
