= The Barn (recording studio) =

Recording studio in Burlington, Vermont

Coordinates: 44.617711°N 73.028720°W

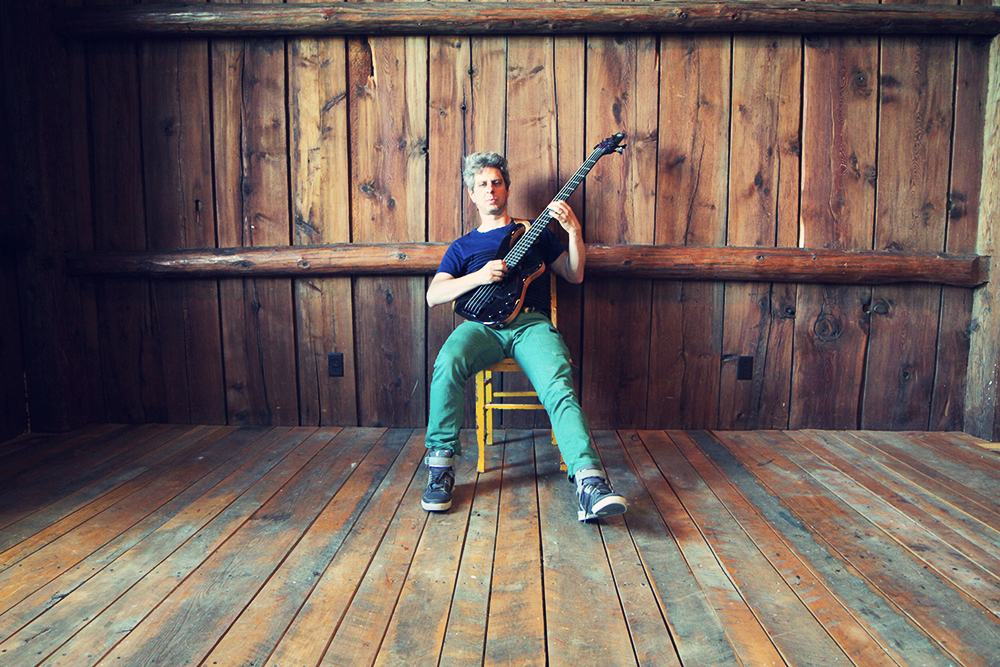
Bassist Mike Gordon of Phish at The Barn in 2014

The Barn, also known as the Farmhouse, is a recording studio, rehearsal space, and artists studio located on the property of Phish guitarist Trey Anastasio in the Green Mountains near Burlington, Vermont.

Reconstructed between 1996 and 1998 from an existing structure, the Alan Irish Barn, The Barn has been used by Phish to record several albums and has hosted all of Anastasio's projects since 1998. In addition, several other artists have recorded or performed at The Barn, including Béla Fleck, John Patitucci, DJ Logic, Toots & the Maytals, Tony Levin, Umphrey's McGee, The Slip, John Medeski, Swampadelica, Jerry Douglas, Patti LaBelle, Leo Kottke, Jim Carrey, Guerilla Toss, Stephen Malkmus, Karina Rykman, Addison Groove Project, and Touchpants.

In addition to its use as Phish's primary rehearsal and recording space, The Barn also serves as the home to the Seven Below Arts Initiative, a non-profit organization formed to advance arts education in Vermont. Following Anastasio's sold-out benefit shows at Webster Hall in New York City, The Barn was modified from a commercial recording facility into an artistic studio, providing housing and studio space to artists participating in the Seven Below residency program. Seven Below has been working with Burlington City Arts to facilitate arts education activities to under-served populations since 2007.

Phish has used the Barn to record all of their studio albums since Farmhouse with the exception of Joy (2009). The band recorded the entirety of their 2020 release Sigma Oasis at the studio.
