= Reunions of the Grateful Dead =

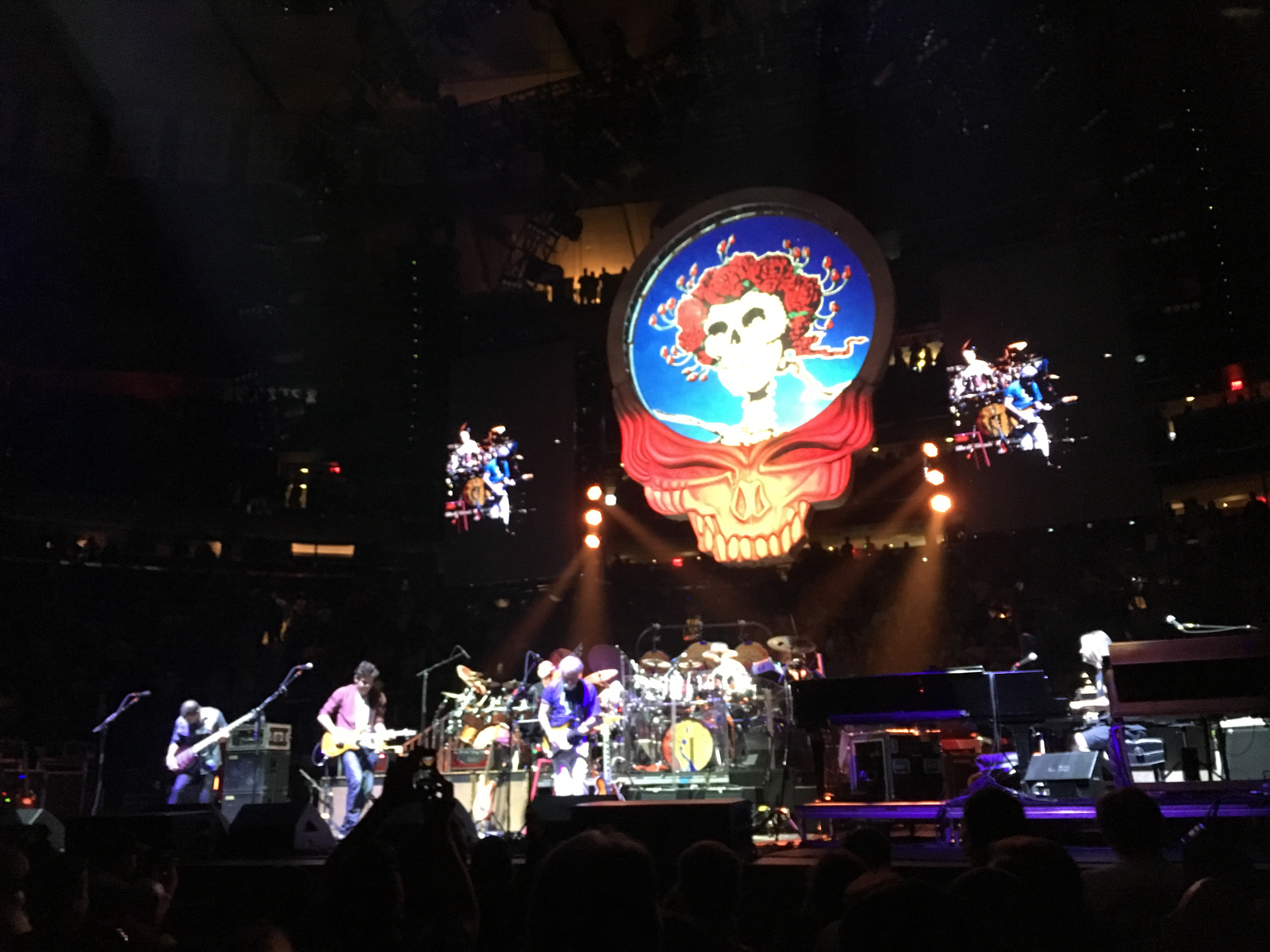
Dead & Company on November 1, 2015 at Madison Square Garden. Front, left to right: Oteil Burbridge, John Mayer, Bob Weir, Jeff Chimenti; Rear, left to right: Bill Kreutzmann, Mickey Hart

The Grateful Dead were an American rock band known for their lengthy, partially improvised performances, as well as for a loyal fan base who often followed the band for several shows or entire tours. They disbanded in 1995, following the death of de facto bandleader Jerry Garcia. Since then remaining members have reunited for a number of concert tours and one-off performances, often in very different configurations. The following is a list of instances where former Grateful Dead members have reunited.

Other than Jerry Garcia, the Grateful Dead's main performing members were Bob Weir, Phil Lesh, Bill Kreutzmann and Mickey Hart. Garcia, Weir, Lesh and Kreutzmann were in the band from its inception in 1965 until its demise in 1995, while Hart had a tenure of 25 non-consecutive years. The other then-current or former members of the Grateful Dead who were living at the time that the band broke up were Tom Constanten, Donna Jean Godchaux, and Vince Welnick. Additionally, Bruce Hornsby was in the lineup for many Dead concerts and was considered an unofficial member of the band. Already deceased in 1995 were Ron "Pigpen" McKernan, Keith Godchaux, and Brent Mydland.

== Tours ==
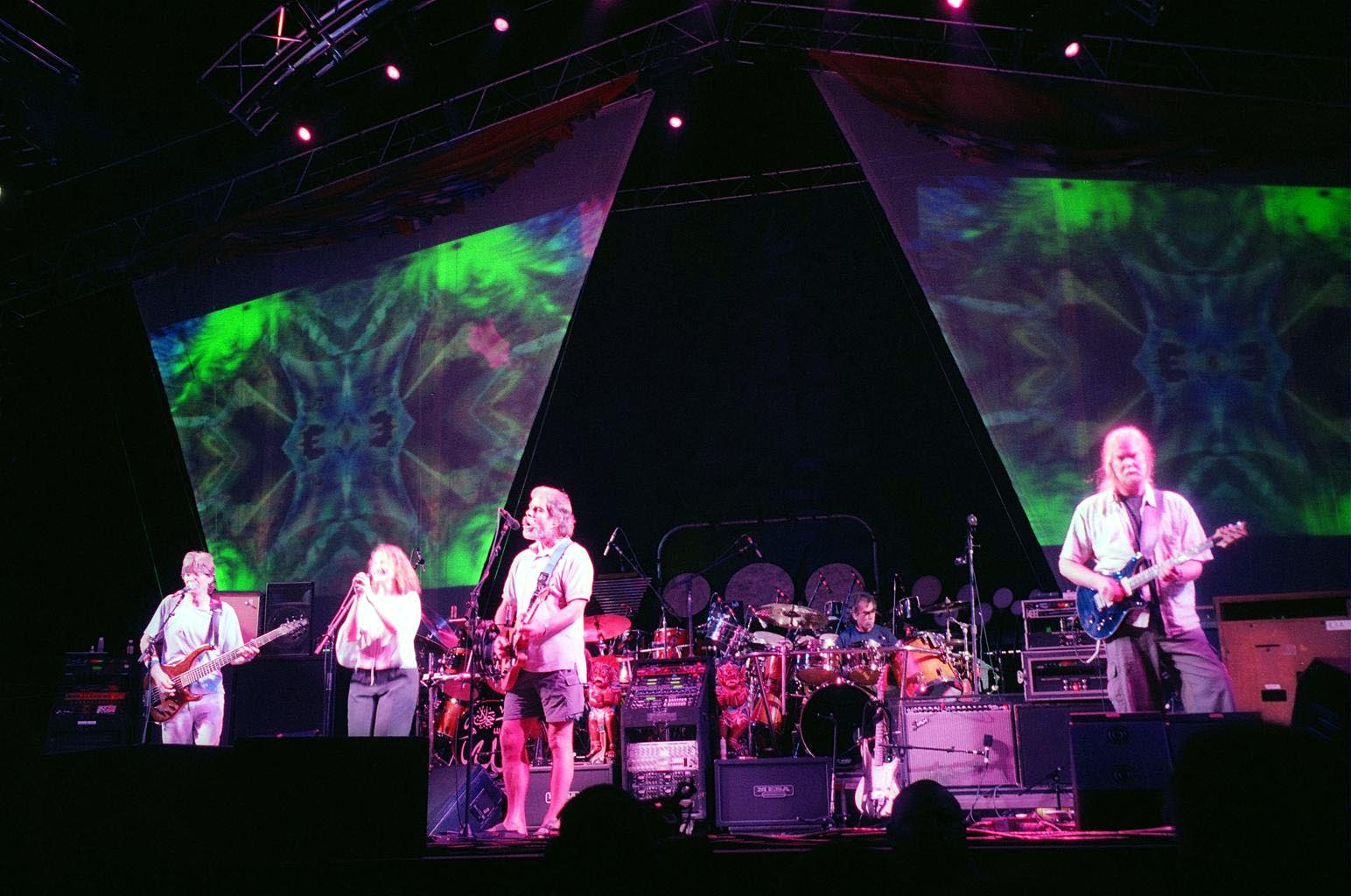
The Dead at the Virginia Beach Amphitheater on June 17, 2003. Left to right: Phil Lesh, Joan Osborne, Bob Weir, Mickey Hart, Jimmy Herring. Not pictured: Bill Kreutzmann, Jeff Chimenti, Rob Barraco

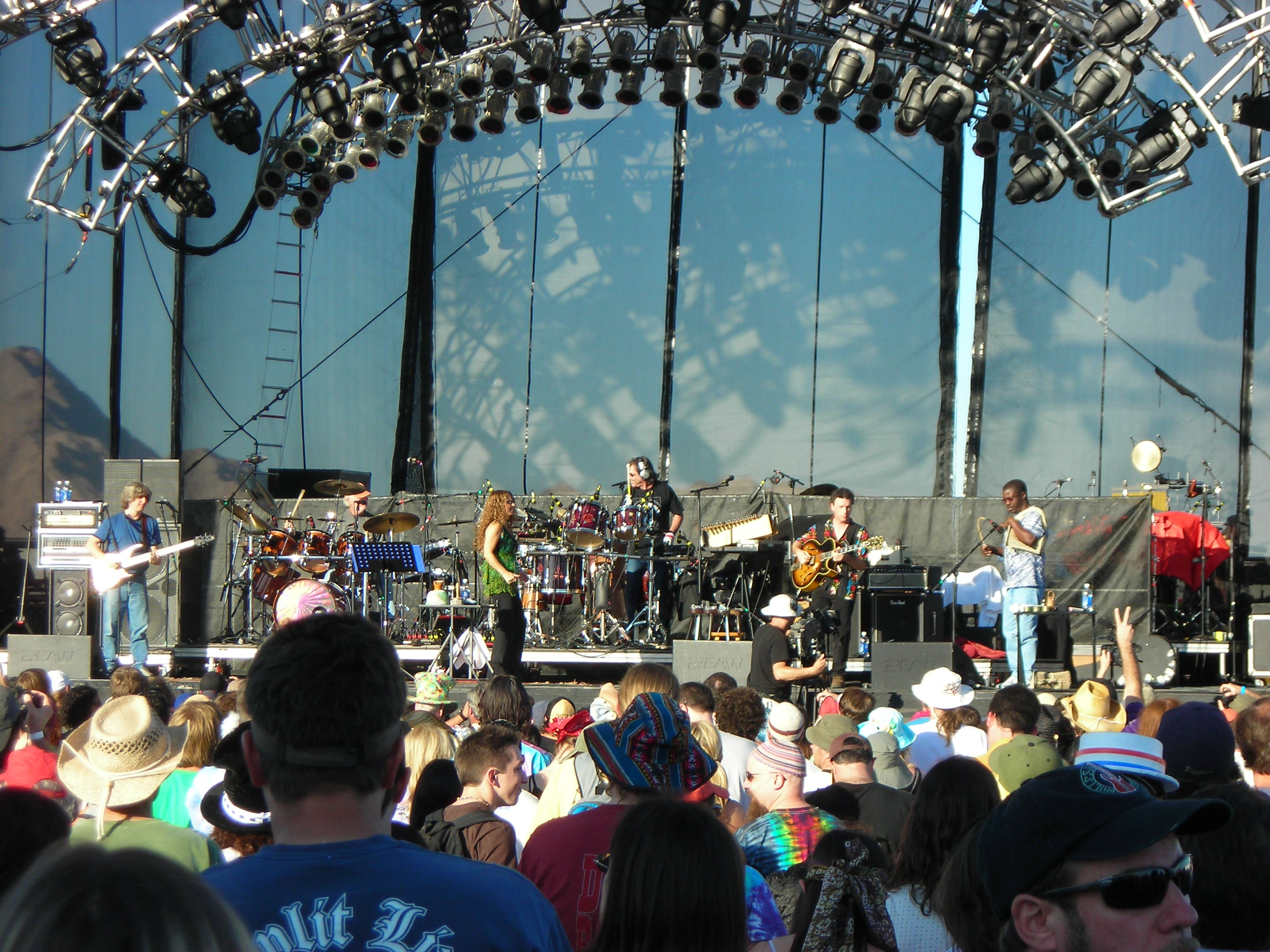
The Rhythm Devils at Sam Boyd Stadium in Las Vegas on October 29, 2006. Left to right: Mike Gordon, Bill Kreutzmann, Jen Durkin, Mickey Hart, Steve Kimock, Sikiru Adepoju

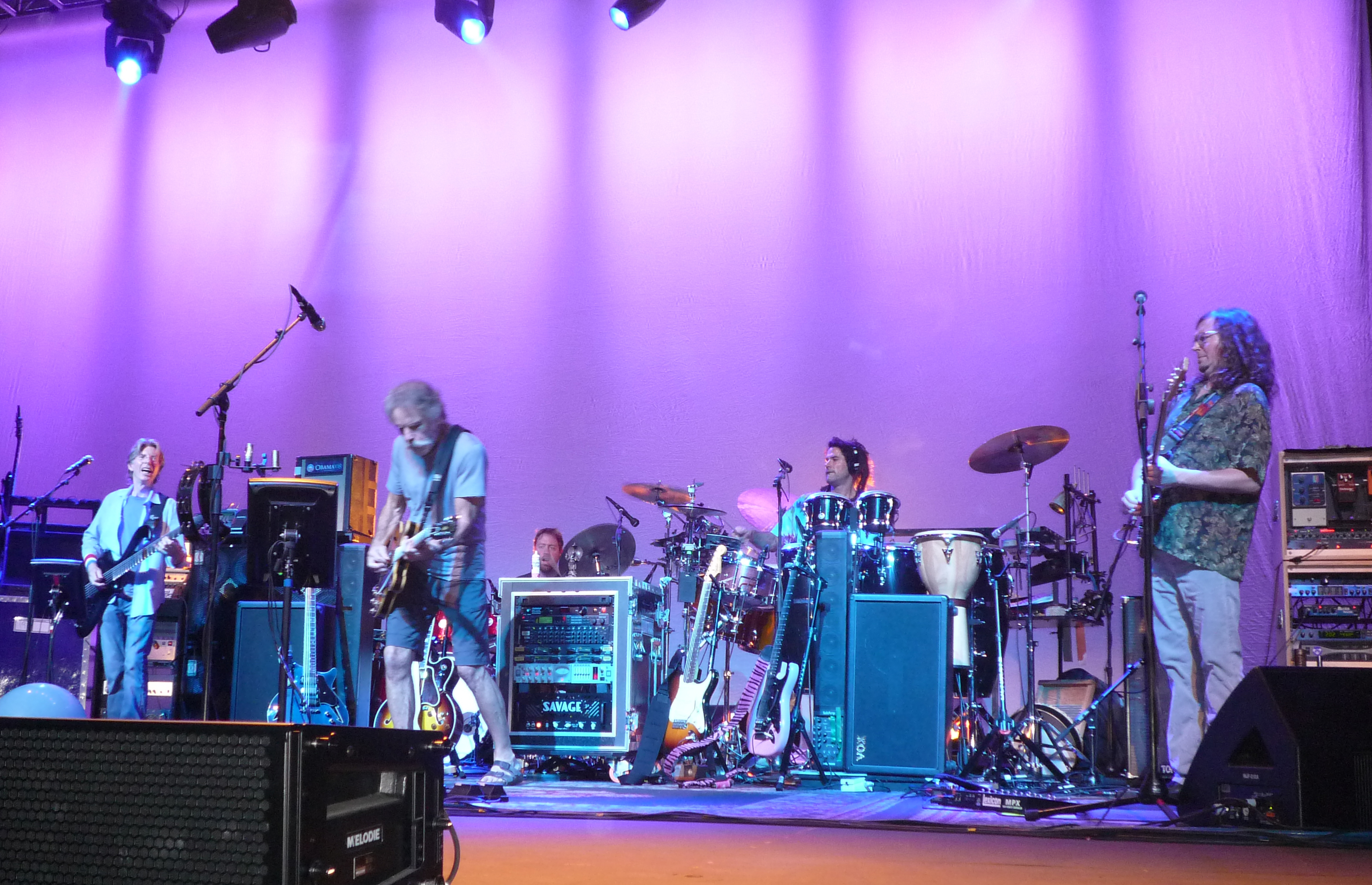
Furthur at the Fox Theatre in Oakland on September 18, 2009. Left to right: Phil Lesh, Bob Weir, Joe Russo, Jay Lane, John Kadlecik. Not pictured: Jeff Chimenti

=== The Other Ones ===
- In 1998 guitarist Bob Weir, bassist Phil Lesh, drummer Mickey Hart and touring keyboardist Bruce Hornsby formed a band called the Other Ones. They toured America with guitarists Steve Kimock and Mark Karan, saxophonist Dave Ellis, and drummer John Molo. A live album from this tour, The Strange Remain, was released in 1999. This series of concerts was part of the third annual Furthur Festival tour, which also featured Hot Tuna and Rusted Root.
- In 2000 the Other Ones launched another tour featuring former Grateful Dead members Weir, Hart, Hornsby and drummer Bill Kreutzmann. Lesh declined to participate and was replaced by Alphonso Johnson. Steve Kimock and Mark Karan continued their roles as co-lead guitarists.
- In 2002 an Other Ones line-up of Bob Weir, Phil Lesh, Bill Kreutzmann and Mickey Hart toured the United States with guitarist Jimmy Herring, keyboardists Jeff Chimenti and Rob Barraco, and vocalist Susan Tedeschi. This was the first time that Weir, Lesh, Kreutzmann, and Hart had toured together since 1995.

=== The Dead ===
- In 2003 the Other Ones changed their name to the Dead. The line-up of Weir, Lesh, Kreutzmann, Hart, Jimmy Herring (guitar), Jeff Chimenti (keyboards), and Rob Barraco (keyboards) toured America again, with Joan Osborne replacing Susan Tedeschi on backing vocals.
- In 2004 the Dead again toured the U.S. Supporting Weir, Lesh, Kreutzmann and Hart were Warren Haynes (guitar), Jimmy Herring (guitar), and Jeff Chimenti (keyboards).
- In 2009 the Dead toured America with a lineup of Weir, Lesh, Kreutzmann, Hart, Warren Haynes, and Jeff Chimenti.

=== The Rhythm Devils ===
- In 2006, Mickey Hart and Bill Kreutzmann re-formed the Rhythm Devils, a percussion-based ensemble that had played intermittently when the Grateful Dead were still together. The band went on tour with a lineup including Sikiru Adepoju (drums and percussion), Steve Kimock (guitar), Mike Gordon (bass), and Jen Durkin (vocals). They subsequently released a video of the tour, called The Rhythm Devils Concert Experience.
- In 2010 Hart and Kreutzmann again toured as the Rhythm Devils. Their band featured Sikiru Adepoju (drums and percussion), Davy Knowles (guitar), and Andy Hess (bass), with multi-instrumentalists Keller Williams for the first part of the tour and Tim Bluhm for the second part.

=== Furthur ===
- In 2009 Bob Weir and Phil Lesh formed a new band called Furthur, with John Kadlecik (guitar), Jeff Chimenti (keyboards), Joe Russo (drums), and Jay Lane (drums). A few months later Sunshine Becker and Zoe Ellis were added to the lineup as backing vocalists.
- In 2010 the band continued touring. In the spring, Lane and Ellis left the group, and Jeff Pehrson (backing vocals) joined.
- In 2011, 2012, and 2013, Furthur continued as before playing several tours each year with the lineup of Bob Weir, Phil Lesh, John Kadlecik, Jeff Chimenti, Joe Russo, Sunshine Becker, and Jeff Pehrson. They also played four concerts in Mexico in January 2014.

=== Fare Thee Well ===
- In 2015, Weir, Lesh, Kreutzmann and Hart performed two concerts (June 27 and 28) at Levi Stadium in Santa Clara, California, and three concerts (July 3, 4, and 5) at Soldier Field in Chicago, Illinois, to celebrate the Grateful Dead's 50th anniversary. They were joined by Trey Anastasio on guitar and Bruce Hornsby and Jeff Chimenti on keyboards. The performances were billed as "Fare Thee Well: Celebrating 50 Years of the Grateful Dead". The concerts were advertised as the final time Weir, Lesh, Kreutzmann and Hart would perform together. Later that year, a live recording of Fare Thee Well was released as an album.

=== Dead & Company ===
- Dead & Company 2015 Tour: After the Fare Thee Well concerts, Weir, Kreutzmann, and Hart joined forces with singer and guitarist John Mayer in a band called Dead & Company. With Lesh declining to commit to another rigorous tour, former Allman Brothers Band bassist Oteil Burbridge was recruited to join, as well as keyboardist Jeff Chimenti. The band played a 22-concert tour in October, November, and December 2015. Although some Deadheads were initially skeptical of Mayer's inclusion, the band's performances were well received.
- Dead & Company Summer Tour 2016: In June and July 2016, Dead & Company played a concert tour of 24 shows. Before the tour began, both Mayer and Weir expressed optimism about the band's future; Mayer said he "will never close the door on Dead & Company, ever" while Weir envisioned future lineups of the band performing long after he, Hart and Kreutzmann are gone.
- Dead & Company Summer Tour 2017: In May, June, and July 2017, the band again toured the country, playing a total of 20 shows.
- Dead & Company Fall Tour 2017: The band played 13 concerts in November and December 2017. Three additional shows were postponed while John Mayer recovered from an appendectomy.
- Dead & Company Summer Tour 2018: The band played a 24-concert tour of the U.S. in May, June, and July 2018.
- Dead & Company Summer Tour 2019: The band played 19 concerts at 14 U.S. locations in May, June, and July 2019.
- Dead & Company Fall Fun Run 2019: Dead & Company performed ten concerts at five locations in October, November, and December 2019.
- Dead & Company Summer Tour 2020: The band was scheduled to tour the U.S. in July and August 2020, but the tour was cancelled because of the coronavirus pandemic.
- Dead & Company 2021 Tour: The band played a national tour in August through October 2021.
- Dead & Company Summer Tour 2022: The band played a national concert tour in June and July 2022.
- Dead & Company Summer Tour 2023: In May, June, and July 2023 the band played a concert series that they stated would be their final tour. Bill Kreutzmann did not join the tour due to "a shift in creative direction". Jay Lane replaced Kreutzmann as Dead & Company's second drummer.
- Dead Forever: Live at Sphere: Dead & Company performed a 30-concert residency at Sphere near Las Vegas in May, June, July, and August 2024. They returned to Sphere to perform a second concert residency, consisting of 18 shows from March 20 through May 17, 2025.
- Dead & Company played three concerts in Golden Gate Park in San Francisco on August 1, 2, and 3, 2025.

== Single shows and other collaborations ==
Furthur Festival 1996 concert tour poster

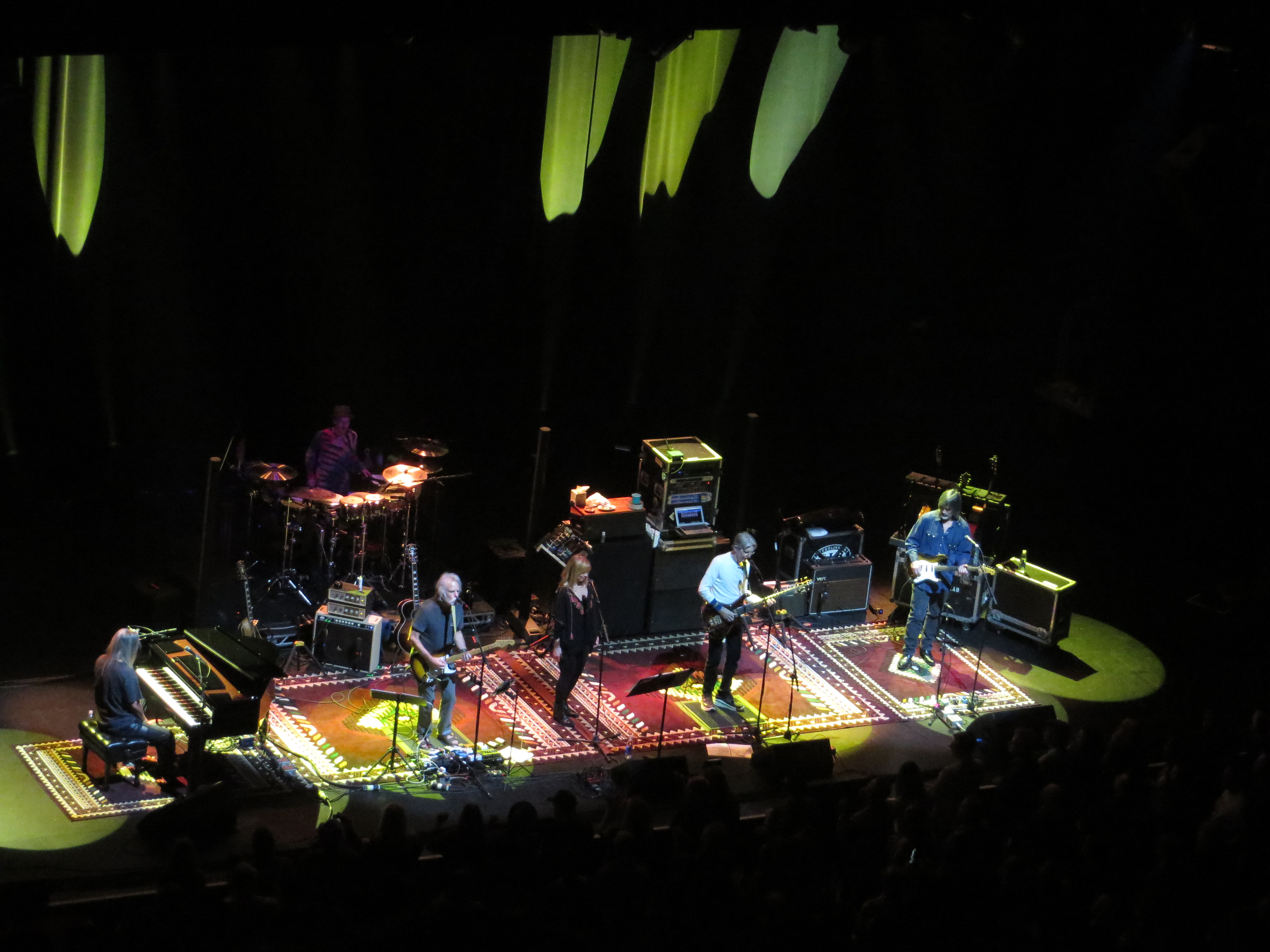
A "Bobby & Phil" concert at the Chicago Theatre, March 10, 2018. Left to right: Jeff Chimenti, Wally Ingram, Bob Weir, Teresa Williams, Phil Lesh, Larry Campbell

- Vince Welnick was a member of Bob Weir's band RatDog from September to December 1995, playing in a total of 14 concerts. Mickey Hart, Bill Kreutzmann, Donna Jean Godchaux and Bruce Hornsby have all guested with RatDog at different times.
- On April 12, 1996, Phil Lesh and Bob Weir joined the Bruce Hornsby Band for the four final songs of the concert, including three Grateful Dead standards and a cover of the Band's "The Weight".
- In June 1996, Phil Lesh, Bob Weir, Mickey Hart, and Vince Welnick joined the San Francisco Symphony Orchestra for three consecutive concerts, performing John Cage's Renga on the first two nights, and an improvisational "Space" segment dedicated to American composer Henry Cowell on the third night.
- In the summer of 1996, the first Furthur Festival toured the United States. Each concert featured performances by multiple bands, including Bob Weir and RatDog, Mickey Hart's Mystery Box, and Bruce Hornsby and his band, along with Hot Tuna and Los Lobos. Weir, Hart, and Hornsby often played together in a jam session at the end of each show, and sometimes sat in with each other's bands for a few songs. They were joined at the Shoreline Amphitheatre show by Phil Lesh.
- On March 6, 1997, Bob Weir and Phil Lesh joined the David Murray Octet for several songs at The Fillmore in San Francisco.
- In the summer of 1997, the second Furthur Festival toured the country. The bands at each show included Bob Weir and RatDog, Mickey Hart and Planet Drum, and Bruce Hornsby, along with the Black Crowes and Moe. Robert Hunter also performed at several of the shows. As on the previous year's tour, Weir, Hart, and Hornsby performed some songs together, and were joined at Shoreline by Phil Lesh.
- On July 25, 1998, at Shoreline Amphitheatre – the last show of the 1998 Furthur Festival tour – Bill Kreutzmann sat in for part of the performance by the Other Ones. It was the first time that Weir, Lesh, Hart, and Kreutzmann had played together since 1995.
- On November 6, 1998, Phil Lesh guested with Bruce Hornsby's band to perform a few songs which included versions of "Scarlet Begonias" and "Tennessee Jed."
- Bob Weir and Phil Lesh have sung the national anthem before several San Francisco Giants baseball games. On September 30, 1999, at the last Giants game at Candlestick Park, they sang it together with Donna Jean Godchaux. Weir and Lesh sang the national anthem for Grateful Dead Tribute Night on August 9, 2010. That night Mickey Hart and Bill Walton led the crowd in singing "Take Me Out to the Ball Game". Weir and Lesh sang the national anthem again on October 15, 2012, a playoff game for the Giants who were on their way to winning the World Series. They sang it again on October 14, 2014, another playoff game en route to another world championship for the Giants. The precedent for these patriotic performances occurred when the Grateful Dead were still together and Jerry Garcia, Bob Weir, and Vince Welnick sang the national anthem before the Giants game on April 12, 1993.
- On December 31, 1999, Bill Kreutzmann and Mickey Hart joined Bob Weir and Ratdog for a few songs. Ratdog members Mark Karan, Dave Ellis, bassist Rob Wasserman and keyboardist Jeff Chimenti backed the three for the first song played. Then Karan, Wasserman and Chimenti were replaced by guitarist Jorma Kaukonen, bassist Jack Casady and keyboardist Pete Sears for three songs.
- Vince Welnick was a member of the Mickey Hart Band for their summer 2000 tour.
- On June 6, 2001, at Sweetwater Saloon in Mill Valley, California, Bob Weir, Phil Lesh, Jimmy Herring, Rob Barraco and John Molo played a show as the Crusader Rabbit Stealth Band. On December 31, 2001, at the Kaiser Auditorium in Oakland, California, the Crusader Rabbit Stealth Band performed again, this time with a lineup of Phil Lesh and Friends (Phil Lesh, Warren Haynes, Jimmy Herring, Rob Barraco, and John Molo), Bob Weir, Bill Kreutzmann, and Mickey Hart.
- On July 23, 2002, Bob Weir and Bill Kreutzmann joined Phil Lesh & Friends for one set. Phil Lesh & Friends guitarists Warren Haynes and Jimmy Herring, drummer John Molo and keyboardist Rob Barraco supported the three musicians.
- On September 25, 2005, Weir, Kreutzmann, Hart, Bruce Hornsby and vocalist Donna Jean Godchaux performed together at the Comes A Time tribute to Jerry Garcia. They were supported by many musicians who came and went through all the songs performed. Notable performers were guitarists Jimmy Herring, Warren Haynes and Trey Anastasio, and vocalists Gloria Jones and Jackie LaBranch. Bass duties were shared by Robin Sylvester and J.V. Collier.
- On August 19, 2006, Bob Weir joined Bill Kreutzmann and Mickey Hart during the Rhythm Devils set at the Gathering of the Vibes. Remaining members of the Rhythm Devils Steve Kimock, bassist Mike Gordon and vocalist Jen Durkin played with them.
- On January 4, 2007, Weir, Kreutzmann, Hart and Bruce Hornsby reunited to perform at a fundraiser for speaker of the house Nancy Pelosi. They were joined by Warren Haynes and Mike Gordon.
- On February 4, 2008, Weir, Lesh and Hart performed a concert called Deadheads for Obama to raise support for presidential candidate Barack Obama. Supporting musicians were John Molo, keyboardist Steve Molitz and guitarists Mark Karan, Barry Sless and Jackie Greene.
- On October 12, 2008, Bob Weir, Phil Lesh, Bill Kreutzmann and Mickey Hart performed a concert at Penn State University called Change Rocks to raise support for presidential candidate Barack Obama. They were supported by Warren Haynes and Jeff Chimenti. The concert was seen as a follow-up to the Deadheads for Obama show earlier that year and it sparked a tour that commenced in 2009.
- Bob Weir has joined Phil Lesh & Friends on several occasions. Bob Weir & RatDog and Phil Lesh & Friends shared a bill at two shows on December 30 and December 31, 2008. Both performances saw Weir and Lesh playing a brief set as a trio with either Jay Lane or John Molo depending on the night. The New Year's Eve show saw a post-midnight set by a band composed of Bob Weir and Phil Lesh along with several members of Phil Lesh & Friends. Bill Kreutzmann and Donna Jean Godchaux has also guested with Phil and his band.
- On January 18, 2009, Bob Weir and Mickey Hart played at a brunch benefit for Al Franken in Washington D.C. This was two days prior to the Dead playing a show at the Mid-Atlantic Ball for president Barack Obama.
- On January 20, 2009, the Dead lineup of Weir, Lesh, Kreutzmann, Hart, Haynes and Chimenti played two sets in Washington D.C. at the Mid-Atlantic Inaugural ball for President Barack Obama.
- On February 18 and 19, 2009, Bob Weir and Phil Lesh made guest appearances at Jackie Greene concerts. The two played brief sets as a trio with Greene in between sets by the Jackie Greene Band. On the 19th Weir and Lesh joined Jackie's band their closing set.
- On March 28, 2009, Bob Weir and Phil Lesh sat in with the Allman Brothers Band during the final show of their 2009 run at the Beacon Theatre. They performed "Sugaree," "I Know You Rider," and "Franklin's Tower" with the Allmans during the beginning of the second set.
- On March 30, 2009, the Dead played three free shows in New York City. Tickets were made available to fans through a contest that lasted three hours on March 27, 2009. Weir, Lesh and Haynes played an acoustic set at the Angel Orensanz Center followed by a full band set at the Gramercy Theatre three hours later and a final show at the Roseland Ballroom. Earlier that day Weir, Lesh and Haynes performed an acoustic version of "Friend of the Devil" on The View.
- On October 30, 2011, Weir and Hart joined Kreutzmann's band 7 Walkers on stage. It was the first time that Kreutzmann and Weir played together since the Dead dissolved in 2009.
- On August 3, 2012, Bob Weir and a rotating lineup of musicians performed a concert at TRI Studios in San Rafael, California called "Move Me Brightly: Celebrating Jerry Garcia's 70th Birthday". These musical artists included Phil Lesh, Donna Jean Godchaux, Jeff Chimenti, Joe Russo, and Mike Gordon. A concert video called Move Me Brightly was released in 2013.
- On May 14, 2015, Weir, Kreutzmann and Hart performed a version of "Fire On the Mountain" together with a house band and with Jimmy Cliff singing lead vocals. This was one of many performances at a concert called "Dear Jerry: Celebrating the Music of Jerry Garcia." More songs were performed by the musicians individually as well as with other collaborations and groups, including Phil Lesh's band Communion.
- Bob Weir joined Bill Kreutzmann's Billy & the Kids at the Peach Music Festival in August 2015.
- On September 12, 2015, Bob Weir joined Bill Kreutzmann's band Billy & the Kids for their entire set at the third annual Lockn' Festival. Mickey Hart joined the band on drums for their final two songs, "One More Saturday Night" and "Not Fade Away." Although Phil Lesh did not perform with the trio, this set was followed immediately by a set from Phil Lesh & Friends which also featured Carlos Santana.
- On May 3, 2017, Bob Weir and Phil Lesh played a concert at Terrapin Crossroads in San Rafael, California, accompanied by Jason Crosby, Grahame Lesh, and Scott Law.
- On August 25, 2017, Bob Weir joined part of the performance of Phil Lesh and the Terrapin Family Band at the Lockn' Festival in Arrington, Virginia. Nicki Bluhm also sat in on some of the songs. The band featured Jason Crosby, Grahame Lesh, Ross James, and Alex Koford.
- In March 2018 Bob Weir and Phil Lesh played a three-city, six-concert tour, billed as "Bobby and Phil".
- The Dead Ahead music festival took place near Cancun, Mexico on January 12–15, 2024. The festival included two performances by a band billed as Dead Ahead, which has a lineup of Bob Weir, Mickey Hart, Jeff Chimenti, Oteil Burbridge, Don Was, and Jay Lane. A number of other bands also performed at the festival, including Bobby Weir & Wolf Bros, Mickey Hart's Noche de Ondas, and Oteil & Friends.

== Touring line-ups ==
- Former Grateful Dead members are in **bold**.

The Other Ones (1998)	**Bob Weir** – rhythm guitar, vocals; **Phil Lesh** – bass, vocals; **Mickey Hart** – drums, vocals; **Bruce Hornsby** – keyboards, vocals; Mark Karan – lead guitar, vocals; Steve Kimock – lead guitar; Dave Ellis – saxophone; John Molo – drums
The Other Ones (2000)	**Bob Weir** – rhythm guitar, vocals; **Bill Kreutzmann** – drums; **Mickey Hart** – drums, vocals; **Bruce Hornsby** – keyboards, vocals; Mark Karan – lead guitar, vocals; Steve Kimock – lead guitar; Alphonso Johnson – bass
The Other Ones (2002)	**Bob Weir** – rhythm guitar, vocals; **Phil Lesh** – bass, vocals; **Bill Kreutzmann** – drums; **Mickey Hart** – drums, vocals; Jimmy Herring – lead guitar; Jeff Chimenti – keyboards, vocals; Rob Barraco – keyboards, vocals; Susan Tedeschi – vocals
The Dead (2003)	**Bob Weir** – rhythm guitar, vocals; **Phil Lesh** – bass, vocals; **Bill Kreutzmann** – drums; **Mickey Hart** – drums, vocals; Jimmy Herring – lead guitar; Jeff Chimenti – keyboards, vocals; Rob Barraco – keyboards, vocals; Joan Osborne – vocals
The Dead (2004)	**Bob Weir** – rhythm guitar, vocals; **Phil Lesh** – bass, vocals; **Bill Kreutzmann** – drums; **Mickey Hart** – drums, vocals; Jimmy Herring – lead guitar; Warren Haynes – lead guitar, vocals; Jeff Chimenti – keyboards, vocals
The Dead (2008–2009)	**Bob Weir** – rhythm guitar, vocals; **Phil Lesh** – bass, vocals; **Bill Kreutzmann** – drums; **Mickey Hart** – drums; Warren Haynes – lead guitar, vocals; Jeff Chimenti – keyboards, vocals
Furthur (2009)	**Bob Weir** – rhythm guitar, vocals; **Phil Lesh** – bass, vocals; John Kadlecik – lead guitar, vocals; Jeff Chimenti – keyboards, vocals; Joe Russo – drums; Jay Lane – drums
Furthur (2009–2010)	**Bob Weir** – rhythm guitar, vocals; **Phil Lesh** – bass, vocals; John Kadlecik – lead guitar, vocals; Jeff Chimenti – keyboards, vocals; Joe Russo – drums; Jay Lane – drums; Sunshine Becker – vocals; Zoe Ellis – vocals
Furthur (2010–2014)	**Bob Weir** – rhythm guitar, vocals; **Phil Lesh** – bass, vocals; John Kadlecik – lead guitar, vocals; Jeff Chimenti – keyboards, vocals; Joe Russo – drums; Sunshine Becker – vocals; Jeff Pehrson – vocals
Fare Thee Well: Celebrating 50 Years of the Grateful Dead (2015)	**Bob Weir** – rhythm guitar, vocals; **Phil Lesh** – bass, vocals; **Bill Kreutzmann** – drums; **Mickey Hart** – drums; **Bruce Hornsby** – piano, vocals; Trey Anastasio – lead guitar, vocals; Jeff Chimenti – keyboards, vocals
Dead & Company (2015–2023)	**Bob Weir** – rhythm guitar, vocals; **Bill Kreutzmann** – drums; **Mickey Hart** – drums; John Mayer – lead guitar, vocals; Jeff Chimenti – keyboards, vocals; Oteil Burbridge – bass, vocals
Dead & Company (2023–2025)	**Bob Weir** – rhythm guitar, vocals; **Mickey Hart** – drums; John Mayer – lead guitar, vocals; Jeff Chimenti – keyboards, vocals; Oteil Burbridge – bass, vocals; Jay Lane – drums
