= Dead & Company =

American rock band

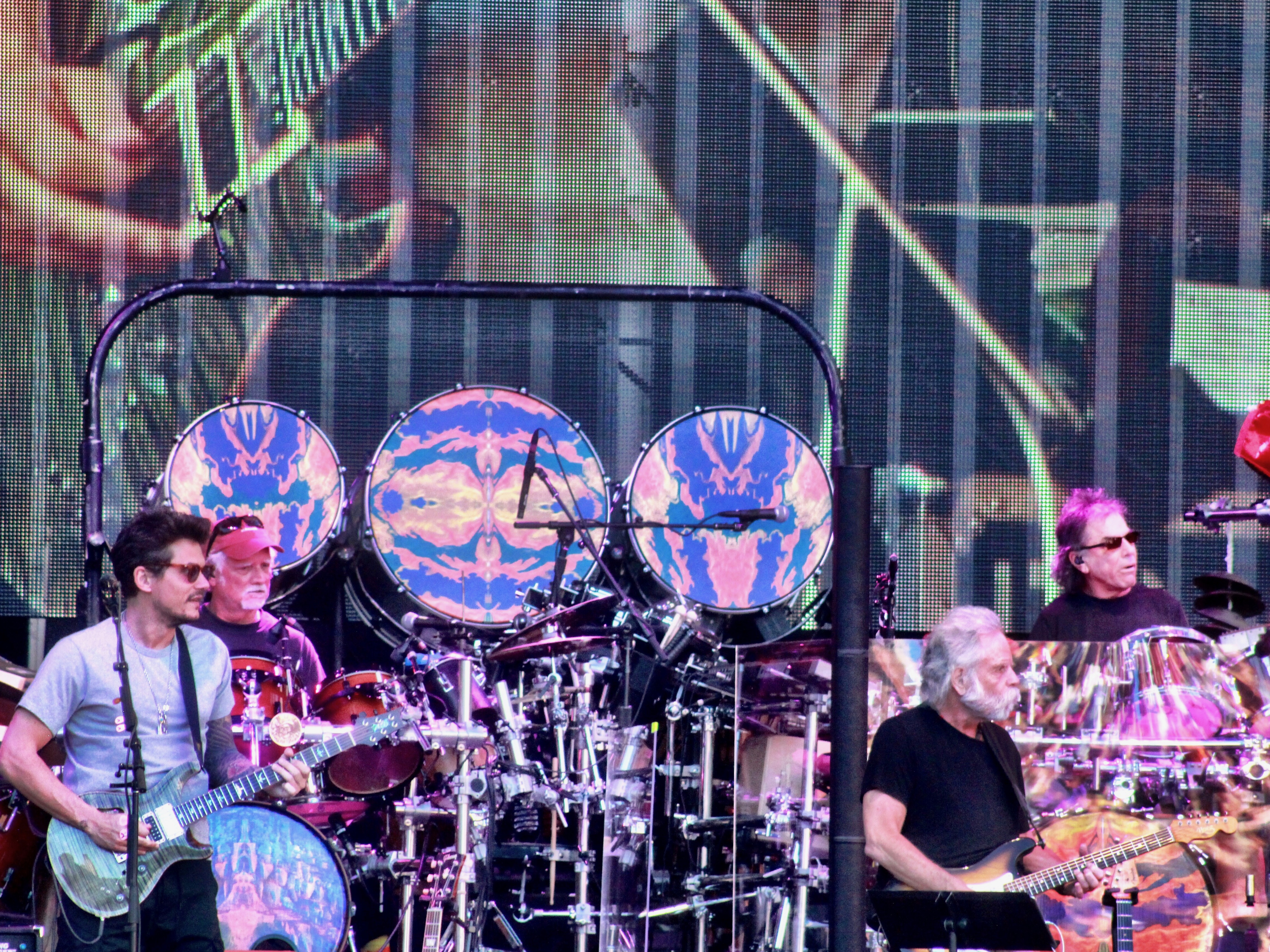
- Dead & Company at Folsom Field in Boulder, Colorado, in June 2017. Left to right: John Mayer, Bill Kreutzmann, Bob Weir, Mickey Hart. Not pictured: Oteil Burbridge and Jeff Chimenti.

Background information
- Genres: Rock; psychedelic rock; roots rock; jazz-rock; jam band
- Years active: 2015–2025
- Spinoff of: Grateful Dead; The Other Ones; The Dead; Furthur
- Members: John Mayer; Mickey Hart; Oteil Burbridge; Jeff Chimenti; Jay Lane
- Past members: Bob Weir; Bill Kreutzmann
- Website: deadandcompany.com

Dead & Company is an American rock band that formed in 2015 with a lineup of former Grateful Dead members Bob Weir (guitar and vocals), Mickey Hart (drums), and Bill Kreutzmann (drums), along with John Mayer (guitar and vocals), Oteil Burbridge (bass, percussion, and vocals), and Jeff Chimenti (keyboards). Jay Lane replaced Kreutzmann on drums in 2023.

Dead & Company primarily perform Grateful Dead covers and is credited with popularizing Grateful Dead music to a younger audience. In 2023, Lane replaced Kreutzmann as the band's second drummer for their final tour. Their final tour was attended by over 840,000 fans, with the final show taking place in San Francisco, the birthplace of the Grateful Dead.

At the tour's conclusion, John Mayer reassured fans that "Dead & Company is still a band," but the timing of future shows was uncertain. Several months later, the band began a residency at Sphere in Las Vegas consisting of 30 shows from May to August 2024. The band returned to Sphere for an 18-show residency from March through May 2025. Most recently, the band performed a three-night run in August 2025 at Golden Gate Park in San Francisco, celebrating 60 years of the Grateful Dead. These shows were Weir's final live performances before his death on January 10, 2026.

After Weir's death Dead & Company made no announcement about whether or not they would continue without him. In August 2026 Mayer gave an interview in which he suggested that he is likely done playing with the band.

A documentary film about Deadheads following the band in 2023, called Summer Tour, was released in 2026.

== History ==
Mayer recounts that in 2011 he was listening to Pandora and happened upon the song "Althea" by the Grateful Dead from their 1980 album Go to Heaven. Impressed by the song, Mayer soon was exploring the Grateful Dead's music and felt creatively invigorated by Jerry Garcia's "phenomenally talented" musicianship to improve his own guitar playing.

In February 2015, while Mayer was guest hosting The Late Late Show, he invited Grateful Dead guitar player Bob Weir to join him in a studio performance. A bond developed between the two, and while Weir and the other three surviving core members of the Grateful Dead were preparing for their 50th anniversary shows, dubbed Fare Thee Well, Mayer began practicing the band's large catalog of songs. That August, Mayer and original Grateful Dead members Weir, Hart, and Kreutzmann formed the band, along with keyboardist Jeff Chimenti (Furthur, RatDog) and bassist Oteil Burbridge (Allman Brothers Band, Aquarium Rescue Unit). Mayer expressed a particularly strong enthusiasm toward playing with the new band.

Phil Lesh, the bassist for the Grateful Dead, did not join Dead & Company. Instead he continued to perform with his band Phil Lesh and Friends. Mike Gordon of Phish was pursued for the bassist role but had to withdraw due to being too busy with other matters.

=== 2015 ===
Dead & Company initially announced only one concert date on October 31, 2015, at Madison Square Garden in New York, but announced a full tour, starting on October 29, shortly afterwards. The shows were called "magical" (Billboard) and the tour was very well received.

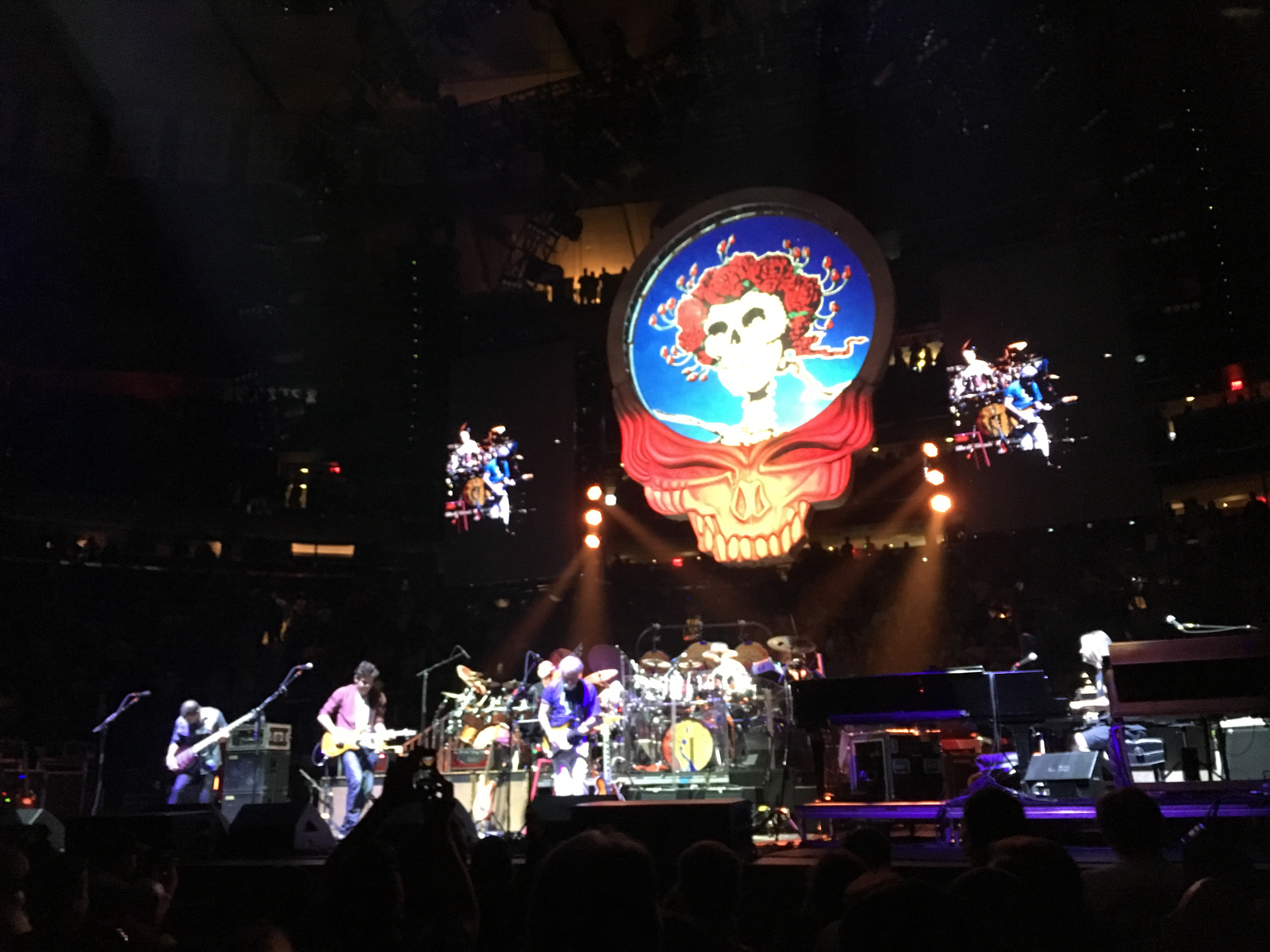
Dead & Company at Madison Square Garden in New York City, on November 1, 2015

Following the band's final 2015 performance on December 31, 2015, Mayer told fans that they could expect more Dead & Company concerts in 2016, and this was confirmed by Weir when he was interviewed on Periscope. The band initially had one performance confirmed for 2016 at the Bonnaroo Music Festival but announced a full summer tour on February 8, 2016. On February 18, 2016, the band performed on The Tonight Show with Jimmy Fallon to promote the tour.

=== 2016 ===
In 2016, Mayer and Weir expressed strong optimism about the band's future, including the possibility of new studio recordings. Mayer said he "will never close the door on Dead & Company, ever." Weir spoke of a "cosmic, out-of-body vision" he had, and a subsequent dream, of the band continuing for decades hence:

We were playing...and suddenly I was viewing this from about 20 feet behind my head, and I looked over at John from that point of view and it was 20 years later and John was almost fully gray. I looked over at Oteil and his hair was white. I looked over to my left and Jeff's hair was all gray." [Then, looking to where he, Hart and Kreutzmann would be playing,] "it was new guys, younger guys holding forth, doing a great job...playing with fire and aplomb....It changed my whole view of what it is that we're up to. I find myself wondering, 'Well, what are they gonna be saying about this new approach or this honoring of this tradition? What are they gonna be saying about that in 200 or 300 years at the Berklee School of Music?' That's the kind of stuff that goes through my head now because this legacy here, there's a chance now that they'll be talking about us in years to come. So I find it incumbent on myself to think in those terms.

When Dead & Company played their first festival performance at the 2016 Bonnaroo Music Festival, former Grateful Dead vocalist Donna Jean Godchaux sat in with the band for several songs. She joined the band again for their shows at Citi Field in Flushing, New York on June 25 and 26, 2016, and at Fenway Park in Boston on July 15 and 16, 2016.

=== 2017 ===
On December 1, 2016, Dead & Company officially announced their 2017 Summer Tour. The tour began on May 27, 2017, and wrapped up on July 1, 2017. The tour consisted of 20 shows in 15 cities.

In a 2017 interview with Rolling Stone, Phil Lesh praised the band's performances, saying "I think they're doing a great job. They're bringing the music to the people just like we always wanted to do, and I commend them for it. I hope they're having a good time. It's not something I could do myself. I'm done with that kind of touring."

On September 7, 2017, Dead & Company officially announced their Fall Tour 2017. The tour began on November 12, 2017, and was scheduled to wrap up on December 8, 2017. However, on December 5, Mayer was hospitalized for an emergency appendectomy, which postponed the New Orleans show that night. Dead & Company subsequently postponed the remaining tour dates, rescheduling them in February, following several independent shows in Mexico. The Fall Tour consisted of 16 shows in 14 cities.

=== 2018 ===
On May 30, 2018, the band began their 2018 summer tour, originally set to end on July 14 but extended to include two shows at the Lockn' Festival on August 25 and 26. On February 15, 17 and 18, 2018, the band kicked off their inaugural Playing in the Sand concerts at the Barceló Maya resort in Riviera Maya, Mexico.

=== 2019 ===
Dead & Company logo

From May 31 to July 6, the band played their 2019 Summer Tour. They performed 19 concerts at 14 locations across the US. The band played a short fall tour in New York City on October 31 and November 1 followed by 2 shows at Uniondale's Nassau Coliseum on November 5 and 6. They then moved south to Hampton, Virginia on November 8 and 9. On December 27 and 28, they played at The Forum in Inglewood, California, as part of their "Fun Run" tour. On December 30 and 31, they played in their hometown of San Francisco at the Chase Center, featuring a bi-plane that descended from the ceiling of the Chase Center carrying the daughters of Jerry Garcia, Trixie Garcia and her half-sister, Ken Kesey's daughter Sunshine Kesey, dropping rose petals on the audience as they toured the arena.

=== 2020 ===
In January 2020, Dead & Company played three concerts as part of the "Playing in the Sand" event at the Moon Palace resort in Cancún, Mexico. The band planned on performing at New Orleans Jazz Fest and to embark on a 2020 Summer Tour, consisting of 17 dates at 14 locations from July 10 to August 8, all of which were cancelled due to the COVID-19 pandemic.

=== 2021 ===
The band played a national tour in August through October 2021. Jay Lane joined Dead & Company as stand-in drummer while Bill Kreutzmann recovered from a respiratory illness for their October 19 and 20, 2021 shows at Red Rocks in Morrison, Colorado, their October 22 and 23 shows at Fiddler's Green in Greenwood Village, Colorado, and their October 31 show at the Hollywood Bowl in Los Angeles.

=== 2022 ===
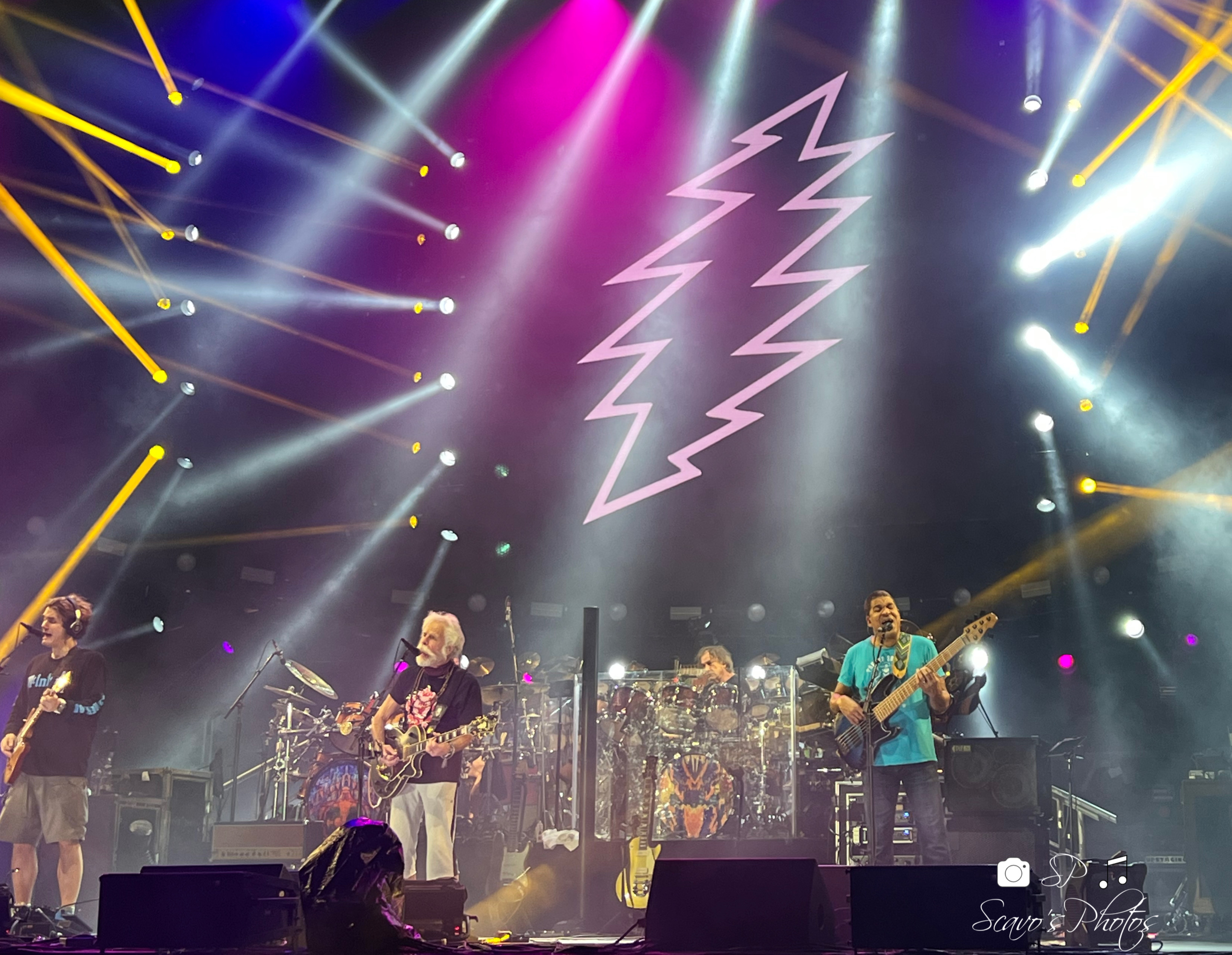
Dead & Company at Wrigley Field in Chicago in 2022

Dead & Company were scheduled to play six concerts – on January 7, 9, 10, 13, 15, and 16 – at the Playing in the Sand festival at the Moon Palace resort in Cancun. However, on January 6 the shows were cancelled due to a surge in cases of COVID-19.

In June and July 2022, the band played a 20-concert summer tour with only one concert being cancelled at Saratoga Performing Arts Center in Saratoga Springs, New York, due to emergency health concerns with Mayer's father.

=== 2023 ===
The band continued their tradition of "Playing in the Sand" shows at a resort in Cancún from January 14 to 17, 2023.

On September 23, 2022, the band announced that their 2023 summer tour concert series would be their final tour. On October 6, 2022, they revealed the tour schedule, to run from May 19 through July 16. On April 22, 2023, it was announced by the band that Kreutzmann would not be performing or touring with Dead & Company during their final tour, due to a "shift in creative direction".

On May 6, 2023, Dead & Company performed at the New Orleans Jazz & Heritage Festival, with Jay Lane again replacing Kreutzmann in the lineup. On May 8 the band played at Barton Hall in Ithaca, New York, the 46th anniversary of the Grateful Dead's May 8, 1977 concert at that venue. On May 19 they played the first concert of their spring and summer tour. On July 16, 2023, Dead and Company played the final show of the tour.

In an interview with ABC published on June 22, 2023, Hart left the door open for future Dead & Company shows, explaining, "It's not final anything. We never said we'll never play again, but we'll never tour again."

=== 2024 ===
In February 2024, the band announced they would be performing a concert residency at Sphere in Las Vegas, Nevada. Dead Forever: Live at Sphere consisted of 30 shows, spanning from May 16 to August 10, 2024. Coinciding with the band's opening night at Sphere, a temporary exhibit called the "Dead Forever Experience" opened at the Venetian resort. It contained archival material including backstage passes, ticket stubs, photos, and tapes. Additionally, SiriusXM's Grateful Dead Channel broadcast live from the venue in the "Deadhead Confessions Booth". The residency grossed $131.4 million from 477,000 tickets sold, making it the 10th-highest-grossing concert residency in history.

=== 2025 ===
Dead & Company returned to Sphere in Las Vegas to perform a second run of the Dead Forever residency, consisting of 18 shows from March 20 through May 17, 2025, in celebration of the band's 10th anniversary. The residency opened and closed with tributes to Grateful Dead bassist Phil Lesh, who had died shortly before the residency leg began.

The band played three concerts on August 1, 2, and 3, 2025 at Golden Gate Park in San Francisco, to celebrate the Grateful Dead's 60th anniversary. The concert series featured guest performances by Billy Strings, Sturgill Simpson (as his alter ego Johnny Blue Skies), the Trey Anastasio Band, and Grahame Lesh, the son of Grateful Dead bassist Phil Lesh. These were the final shows played by founding member Bob Weir prior to his death in January 2026.

== Discography ==
The band has not released any studio recordings. Concert recordings from their 2016 to 2023 tours are available through their website, Livedead.co, and streaming on nugs.net and other major platforms.

== Members ==
- Bob Weir – rhythm guitar, lead and backing vocals (Grateful Dead 1965–1995)
- Mickey Hart – percussion, drums (Grateful Dead 1967–1971; 1974–1995)
- Bill Kreutzmann – drums (2015–2023) (Grateful Dead 1965–1995)
- John Mayer – lead guitar, lead and backing vocals
- Jeff Chimenti – keyboards, backing vocals
- Oteil Burbridge – bass, percussion, backing and lead vocals
- Jay Lane – drums (2023–2025) (occasional sub for Kreutzmann 2021–2022)

== Tours ==
- Dead & Company 2015 Tour
- Dead & Company Summer Tour 2016
- Dead & Company Summer Tour 2017
- Dead & Company Fall Tour 2017
- Dead & Company Summer Tour 2018
- Dead & Company Summer Tour 2019
- Dead & Company Fall Fun Run 2019
- Dead & Company 2021 Tour
- Dead & Company Summer Tour 2022
- Dead & Company Summer Tour 2023

=== Residencies ===
- Dead Forever: Live at Sphere

=== Standalone shows ===
The band has played sixteen concerts that are not officially part of any tour:

- May 23, 2016, The Fillmore, San Francisco (free show)
- November 9, 2017, AT&T Park, San Francisco (single set at Band Together Bay Area benefit concert for victims of the 2017 California wildfires)
- February 15, 17 and 18, 2018, Playing In The Sand, Barceló Maya resort in Riviera Maya, Mexico
- January 17, 19 and 20, 2019, Playing In The Sand, Barceló Maya resort in Riviera Maya, Mexico
- January 16, 18 and 19, 2020, Playing In The Sand, Moon Palace Cancún resort in Riviera Maya, Mexico
- January 14, 16 and 17, 2023, Playing In The Sand, at Moon Palace Cancún in Riviera Maya, Mexico
- June 19, 2024, Sphere, Paradise, Nevada (private one-set performance at Hewlett Packard Enterprise's 2024 Discover conference)
- January 30, 2025, Los Angeles Convention Center, Los Angeles (three-song performance at the 2025 MusiCares Person of the Year benefit gala)
- August 1, 2, and 3rd, 2025, Golden Gate Park in San Francisco, CA.

== See also ==
- Fare Thee Well: Celebrating 50 Years of the Grateful Dead
- Reunions of the Grateful Dead
