= Dead & Company Fall Fun Run 2019 =

2019 concert tour by Dead & Company

Fall Fun Run 2019
- Tour by Dead & Company
- Location: United States
- Start date: October 31, 2019
- End date: December 31, 2019
- Legs: 1
- No. of shows: 10

Dead & Company concert chronology
- Dead & Company Summer Tour 2019; Dead & Company Fall Fun Run 2019; Dead & Company Fall Tour 2021

Dead & Company Fall Fun Run 2019 was a concert tour by the rock band Dead & Company. It followed the band's Summer Tour 2019. The tour comprised ten dates across five locations from October 31 to December 31, 2019.

The band played six shows on the East Coast at the end of October and the beginning of November, followed by four shows in California at the end of December.

== Tour dates ==
Date	City	Country	Venue
October 31, 2019	New York City	United States	Madison Square Garden
November 1, 2019	New York City	United States	Madison Square Garden
November 5, 2019	Uniondale	United States	Nassau Coliseum
November 6, 2019	Uniondale	United States	Nassau Coliseum
November 8, 2019	Hampton	United States	Hampton Coliseum
November 9, 2019	Hampton	United States	Hampton Coliseum
December 27, 2019	Inglewood	United States	The Forum
December 28, 2019	Inglewood	United States	The Forum
December 30, 2019	San Francisco	United States	Chase Center
December 31, 2019	San Francisco	United States	Chase Center

== Musicians ==
- Bob Weir – guitar, vocals
- Mickey Hart – drums
- Bill Kreutzmann – drums
- John Mayer – guitar, vocals
- Oteil Burbridge – bass, percussion, vocals
- Jeff Chimenti – keyboards, vocals

== See also ==
- Reunions of the Grateful Dead
