= Dead & Company Summer Tour 2016 =

2016 concert tour by Dead & Company

- Tour by Dead & Company
- Location: United States
- Start date: June 10, 2016
- End date: July 30, 2016
- Legs: 1
- No. of shows: 24

Dead & Company concert chronology
- Dead & Company 2015 Tour; Dead & Company Summer Tour 2016; Dead & Company Summer Tour 2017

The Dead & Company Summer Tour 2016 was a concert tour by the rock band Dead & Company during June and July 2016. It was the band's second tour, following their 2015 tour. At the band's final show for the 2015 tour at The Forum in Inglewood, California, John Mayer hinted that the band would continue touring in 2016, stating at the conclusion of the show, "At the risk of rocking any boats—known and unknown—we'll see you next year."

During the hiatus between the two tours, the band played a free show on May 23, 2016 in San Francisco.

== Overview ==
The Dead & Company Summer Tour 2016 took place between June 9 and July 30, 2016, comprising a total of 24 concerts in 20 different cities (including performances at three different baseball and football stadiums). The band was one of the headliners at the 2016 Bonnaroo Music Festival.

The tour ended with the July 30 show at the Shoreline Amphitheatre in Mountain View, California. The final concert on the east coast was on July 16 at Fenway Park in Boston, Massachusetts. During the course of their career, the Grateful Dead never performed at Fenway Park, and these concerts marked the first shows ever performed there by members of the former band.

Prior to the tour, the band had two public performances in 2016: a promotional appearance on February 18 on The Tonight Show Starring Jimmy Fallon, and a free show on May 23 at The Fillmore in San Francisco, for which in lieu of payment the band asked attendees to "pay it forward" in some way.

Former Grateful Dead vocalist Donna Jean Godchaux-MacKay sat in with the band at their performance on June 12 at the Bonnaroo Music Festival as well as their performances on June 25 and 26 at Citi Field in Flushing, NY and on July 15 and 16 at Fenway Park in Boston, MA.

== Tour dates ==
The band performed a total of 24 concerts in 20 different U.S. cities.

| Date | City | Country | Venue | Tickets sold / Available | Revenue |
|---|---|---|---|---|---|
| June 10, 2016 | Charlotte | United States | PNC Music Pavilion | 18,251 / 18,881 | $1,244,311 |
| June 12, 2016 | Manchester | United States | Great Stage Park (Bonnaroo Music Festival) | —N/a | —N/a |
| June 16, 2016 | Cincinnati | United States | Riverbend Music Center | 16,211 / 20,508 | $941,133 |
| June 17, 2016 | Noblesville | United States | Klipsch Music Center | 16,631 / 24,740 | $961,113 |
| June 20, 2016 | Camden | United States | BB&T Pavilion | 19,172 / 25,441 | $1,277,629 |
| June 21, 2016 | Saratoga Springs | United States | Saratoga Performing Arts Center | 19,429 / 25,151 | $1,139,939 |
| June 23, 2016 | Bristow | United States | Jiffy Lube Live | 12,941 / 23,389 | $973,368 |
| June 25, 2016 | New York City | United States | Citi Field | 49,745 / 69,370 | $5,145,264 |
| June 26, 2016 | New York City | United States | Citi Field | 49,745 / 69,370 | $5,145,264 |
| June 28, 2016 | Hartford | United States | Xfinity Theatre | 16,419 / 24,028 | $865,725 |
| July 2, 2016 | Boulder | United States | Folsom Field | 49,166 / 85,582 | $4,179,233 |
| July 3, 2016 | Boulder | United States | Folsom Field | 49,166 / 85,582 | $4,179,233 |
| July 7, 2016 | Clarkston | United States | DTE Energy Music Theatre | 13,945 / 14,871 | $883,298 |
| July 9, 2016 | East Troy | United States | Alpine Valley Music Theatre | 41,915 / 71,030 | $2,583,858 |
| July 10, 2016 | East Troy | United States | Alpine Valley Music Theatre | 41,915 / 71,030 | $2,583,858 |
| July 13, 2016 | Burgettstown | United States | First Niagara Pavilion | 15,615 / 23,143 | $950,169 |
| July 15, 2016 | Boston | United States | Fenway Park | 57,606 / 72,710 | $5,617,256 |
| July 16, 2016 | Boston | United States | Fenway Park | 57,606 / 72,710 | $5,617,256 |
| July 22, 2016 | Portland | United States | Moda Center | 8,791 / 10,972 | $971,613 |
| July 23, 2016 | George | United States | The Gorge Amphitheatre | 12,144 / 21,531 | $777,667 |
| July 26, 2016 | Irvine | United States | Irvine Meadows Amphitheatre | 13,529 / 14,246 | $1,090,966 |
| July 27, 2016 | Chula Vista | United States | Sleep Train Amphitheatre | 8,906 / 18,086 | $710,057 |
| July 29, 2016 | Wheatland | United States | Toyota Amphitheatre | 9,141 / 16,731 | $663,004 |
| July 30, 2016 | Mountain View | United States | Shoreline Amphitheatre | 21,564 / 21,564 | $1,268,290 |

== Musicians ==
- Mickey Hart – drums, percussion
- Bill Kreutzmann – drums
- John Mayer – lead guitar, lead/backing vocals
- Bob Weir – rhythm guitar, lead/backing vocals
- Oteil Burbridge – bass guitar, percussion, backing vocals
- Jeff Chimenti – keyboards, backing vocals

With:

- Donna Jean Godchaux - Vocals (some dates)

== See also ==
- Fare Thee Well: Celebrating 50 Years of the Grateful Dead
- Reunions of the Grateful Dead
