= Folsom Field =

Stadium in Colorado, US

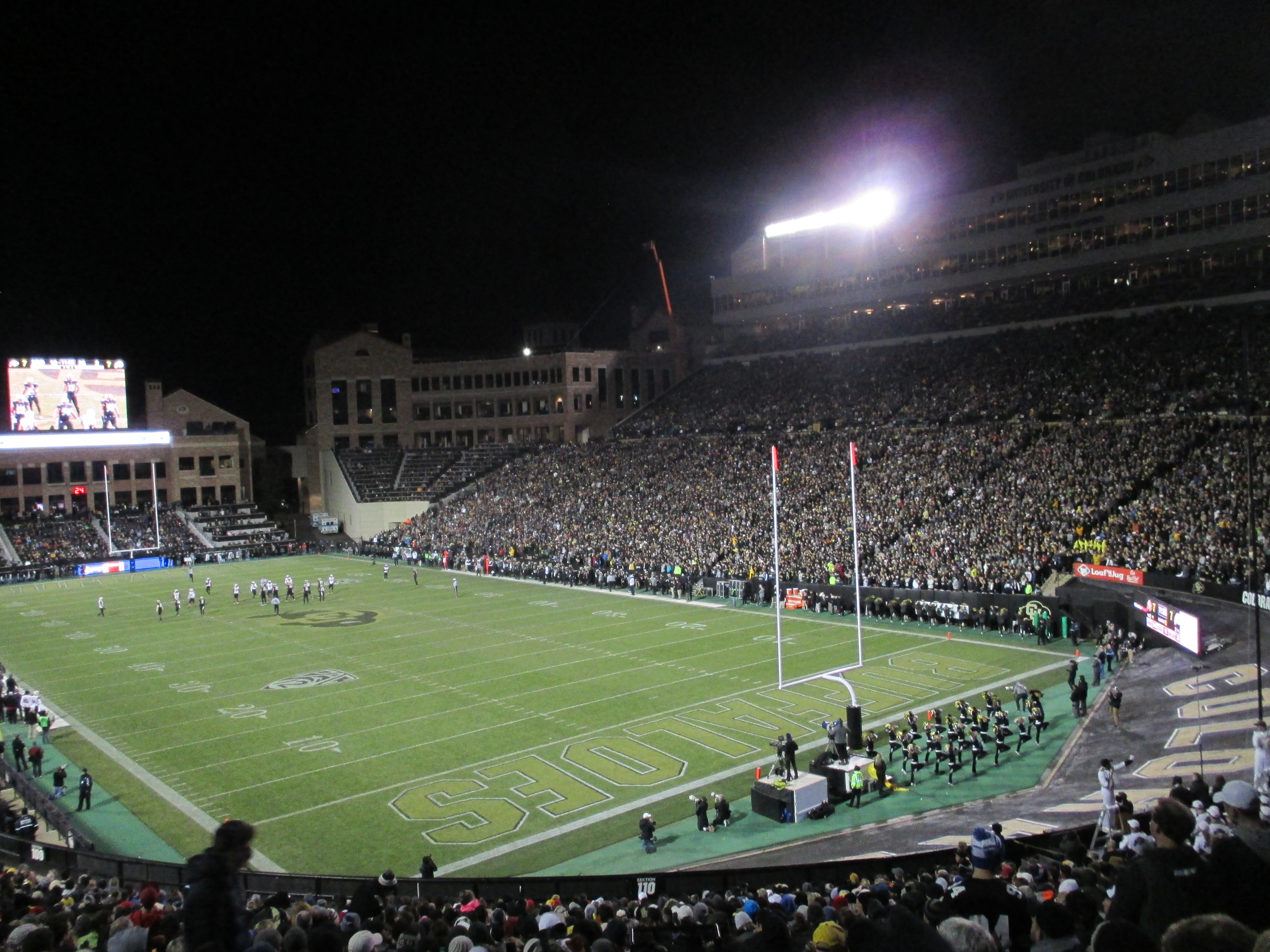
- Sold out night game with Utah in 2016

- Location within the United States Location within Colorado
- Interactive map of Folsom Field
- Former names: Colorado Stadium (1924–1944)
- Address: 2400 Colorado Avenue
- Location: University of Colorado; Boulder, Colorado, U.S.
- Coordinates: 40.009°N 105.267°W
- Elevation: 5,360 feet (1,635 m) AMSL
- Owner: University of Colorado
- Operator: University of Colorado
- Capacity: 50,183 (2014–present) Former capacities: List: 53,613 (2010–2013); 53,750 (2003–2009); 50,942 (2001–2002); 51,655 (1999–2000); 51,808 (1996–1998); 51,748 (1991–1995); 51,463 (1979–1990); 52,005 (1976–1978); 50,516 (1967–1975); 45,000 (1956–1966); 26,000 (1924–1955)
- Surface: Natural grass (1924–1970, 1999–2024); AstroTurf (1971–1998); FieldTurf (2025-present)
- Record attendance: 54,972

Construction
- Groundbreaking: January 14, 1924
- Opened: October 11, 1924; 102 years ago
- Renovated: 1968, 1976, 2003
- Expanded: 1956, 1967, 2003
- Cost: $65,000 (1924)
- Architects: Waldo E. Brockway Sink Combs Dethlefs (renovations)

Tenant
- Colorado Buffaloes (NCAA) (1924–present)

Website
- cubuffs.com/folsom-field

Folsom Field is an outdoor college football stadium in the western United States, located on the campus of the University of Colorado in Boulder, Colorado. It is the home field of the Colorado Buffaloes of the Big 12 Conference.

Opened 102 years ago in 1924, the horseshoe-shaped stadium has a traditional north–south configuration, opening to the north. The university's athletic administration center, named after 1950s head coach Dal Ward, is located at the north end.

The playing field returned to artificial turf in 2025 and sits at an elevation of 5,360 feet (1,635 m), more than a mile above sea level. Folsom Field is the third highest stadium in FBS college football, behind only Wyoming and Air Force of the Mountain West Conference.

== History ==
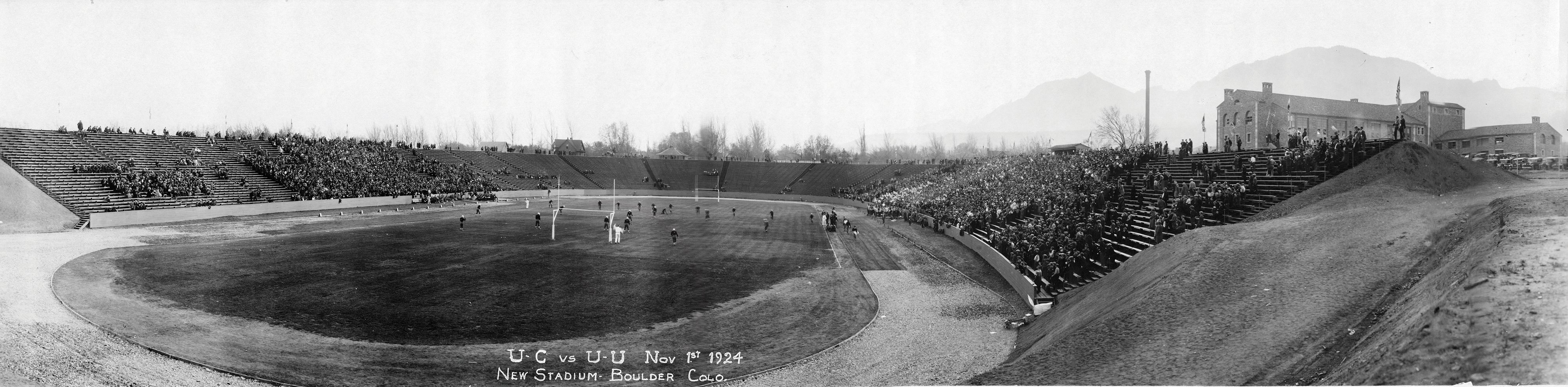
Folsom Field in 1924 during a game against Utah

Gamble Field was the home of Colorado football for two decades, through the first game of the 1924 season. Opened as Colorado Stadium on October 11, Folsom Field has been the continuous home of Buffaloes football. Through the 2021 season, the Buffs have a home record of 323–181–14 (.637).

The stadium was also unofficially called Norlin Stadium, against the wishes of university president George Norlin himself. Colorado Stadium was renamed Folsom Field in 1944, following the death of former head coach Fred Folsom. He led the Silver and Gold for fifteen seasons (1895–99, 1901–02, 1908–15), compiling an overall record of 78–24–2 (.760). The stadium was officially rechristened in the 1946 homecoming game.

In 2008, Folsom Field became the first "zero-waste" stadium in the NCAA by instituting a rigorous recycling and composting program.

== Expansions and renovations ==
Folsom Field 135th commencement on June 9, 1967. 1,836 degrees were awarded

When opened in 1924, the horseshoe-shaped stadium had a capacity of 26,000; a major expansion in 1956 raised the height of the stadium, with a new seating capacity of 45,000. The removal of the running track in 1967 added six thousand seats; the track and field team relocated to Potts Field on the East Campus.

A sizable, six-level press box was added in 1968 to the top of the west side grandstand, directly in front of Balch Fieldhouse, the former home of the basketball team. Renovations continued in 1976 when the old, rickety wooden bleachers were replaced with aluminum ones, raising the capacity to 52,005.

In 2003, suites and club seating were added to the east side of the stadium, raising the capacity to 53,750. Since the 2003 renovation, 137 seats with obstructed views have been removed, lowering the seating capacity to 53,613.

In 2014, construction for a further expansion started. This expansion included a new indoor practice facility, a high performance sports center, as well as extra seating on the northeast corner of the stadium.

Before the start of the 2016 season, as part of a $156 million initiative, the north endzone was completely rebuilt. Existing bleachers were renovated into large boxes, club level seating & areas.

The most recent renovation replaced the south endzone's video board, in addition to extending the ribbon board. Completed before the start of the 2024 season, the new video board is over five times the surface area of the previous video board.

== Playing surface ==
From 1924 through 1970, the playing surface at Folsom Field was natural grass. In the summer of 1971, AstroTurf was installed and the first game played on the new surface was a 56–13 win over Wyoming on September 18. Unranked in the preseason, the 1971 Buffs finished third in the AP Poll behind Nebraska and Oklahoma, for a sweep of the top three spots by the Big Eight Conference. The synthetic turf was replaced in 1978 and again in 1989, with "Astroturf-8."

After 28 years of AstroTurf, Folsom Field returned to natural grass in the spring of 1999. The project, which included bio-thermal heating, drainage, and a sub-air system, cost $1.2 million.

In March 2025, Colorado announced that the natural grass surface would be replaced again with AstroTurf 3D3 starting the next season. This was done to prepare Folsom Field for potentially hosting the College Football Playoff in the future as the grass is difficult to grow in the winter when the playoffs take place; and so the stadium can host concerts outside of summer. The new turf is expected to be completed on July 1.

== Other uses ==
=== Concerts ===
The Grateful Dead played at Folsom on September 3, 1972, and as part of their 15th anniversary June 7 & 8, 1980. The September 1972 show has been partially released on Dick's Picks Volume 36.

The Rolling Stones were at the venue on July 16, 1978, and October 3 & 4, 1981.

The stadium played host to a concert, later released on DVD, by the Dave Matthews Band on July 11, 2001. The band were fined $15,000 for playing 15 minutes over the stadium's curfew time. Afterwards, no concerts were held at Folsom Field for fifteen years.

The stadium hosted Dead & Company for two-night stands during their 2016, 2017, 2018, 2019, and 2022 summer tours. The band holds the record for number of performances at the venue, with 13 shows after the three night stand at Folsom Field for their final Summer Tour in 2023.

Date	Artist	Opening act(s)	Tour / Concert name	Attendance	Revenue	Notes
September 7, 1969	Country Joe and the Fish	Steve Miller Band; Buddy Guy				
September 3, 1972	Grateful Dead		Summer '72 Tour			Rained during show. Officially released on Dick's Picks Volume 36.
May 10, 1975	The Doobie Brothers	Henry Gross, Golden Earring, War				
May 1, 1977	Colorado Sun Day Festival; Fleetwood Mac, Bob Seger, Firefall, John Sebastian					
May 13, 1978	The Beach Boys	Journey				
July 16, 1978	The Rolling Stones		US Tour 1978	60,000 / 60,000	$690,000	
July 21, 1978	Fleetwood Mac		Rumours Tour			
July 29, 1978	Eagles	Steve Miller Band				
May 13, 1979	The Doobie Brothers					
June 7, 1980	Grateful Dead	Warren Zevon	Summer '80 Tour			
June 8, 1980	Grateful Dead	Warren Zevon	Summer '80 Tour			
June 28, 1980	Eagles					
July 19, 1980	REO Speedwagon					
October 3, 1981	The Rolling Stones		American Tour 1981	120,000	$1,920,000	
October 4, 1981	The Rolling Stones		American Tour 1981	120,000	$1,920,000	
August 21, 1982	REO Speedwagon					
October 17, 1982	The Who					
August 30, 1983	Simon & Garfunkel					
July 12, 1986	Colorado Sun Day Festival; Van Halen, Loverboy, Dio, Bachman-Turner Overdrive		5150 Tour			
August 13, 1989	The Who					
May 26, 1993	Paul McCartney		The New World Tour	37,245 / 39,137	$1,210,463	
July 11, 2001	Dave Matthews Band	Angelique Kidjo; Wyclef Jean	Summer 2001 Tour	43,041 / 43,041	$2,130,593	This show was recorded for the album and DVD entitled, Live at Folsom Field, Boulder, Colorado.
July 2, 2016	Dead & Company		Dead & Company Summer Tour 2016	49,166 / 85,582	$4,179,233	Dead & Company holds the record for number of performances at the venue, with 13 shows
July 3, 2016	Dead & Company		Dead & Company Summer Tour 2016	49,166 / 85,582	$4,179,233	Dead & Company holds the record for number of performances at the venue, with 13 shows
June 9, 2017	Dead & Company		Dead & Company Summer Tour 2017	55,882 / 86,982	$4,365,860	Dead & Company holds the record for number of performances at the venue, with 13 shows
June 10, 2017	Dead & Company		Dead & Company Summer Tour 2017	55,882 / 86,982	$4,365,860	Dead & Company holds the record for number of performances at the venue, with 13 shows
July 13, 2018	Dead & Company		Dead & Company Summer Tour 2018	62,904 / 86,982	$5,369,669	Dead & Company holds the record for number of performances at the venue, with 13 shows
July 14, 2018	Dead & Company		Dead & Company Summer Tour 2018	62,904 / 86,982	$5,369,669	Dead & Company holds the record for number of performances at the venue, with 13 shows
July 5, 2019	Dead & Company		Dead & Company Summer Tour 2019	67,835 / 86,982	$6,512,990	Dead & Company holds the record for number of performances at the venue, with 13 shows
July 6, 2019	Dead & Company		Dead & Company Summer Tour 2019	67,835 / 86,982	$6,512,990	Dead & Company holds the record for number of performances at the venue, with 13 shows
June 17, 2022	Dead & Company		Dead & Company Summer Tour 2022	55,601 / 85,646	$6,112,360	Dead & Company holds the record for number of performances at the venue, with 13 shows
June 18, 2022	Dead & Company		Dead & Company Summer Tour 2022	55,601 / 85,646	$6,112,360	Dead & Company holds the record for number of performances at the venue, with 13 shows
July 1, 2023	Dead & Company		Dead & Company Summer Tour 2023	131,450 tickets sold spanning all three shows	$13,371,629	Dead & Company holds the record for number of performances at the venue, with 13 shows
July 2, 2023	Dead & Company		Dead & Company Summer Tour 2023	131,450 tickets sold spanning all three shows	$13,371,629	Dead & Company holds the record for number of performances at the venue, with 13 shows
July 3, 2023	Dead & Company		Dead & Company Summer Tour 2023	131,450 tickets sold spanning all three shows	$13,371,629	Dead & Company holds the record for number of performances at the venue, with 13 shows
June 29, 2024	Odesza	Bob Moses; Big Boi; Golden Features	The Last Goodbye: Finale			First EDM show at Folsom Field
August 17, 2024	Tyler Childers		Mule Pull ’24 Tour			
July 3, 2025	Phish		Summer Tour 2025			
July 4, 2025	Phish		Summer Tour 2025			
July 5, 2025	Phish		Summer Tour 2025			
October 18, 2025	John Summit	Max Styler; Roddy Lima; B/AN/K; Tchami	Experts Only 2025			
June 6, 2026	Mumford & Sons					
July 18, 2026	Tyler Childers	Jon Batiste				
August 22, 2026	Rüfüs Du Sol					

=== In popular culture ===
The south end zone was featured in the opening and closing credits of the late 1970s television show Mork and Mindy, which was set in Boulder.

=== Other events ===
Folsom Field is also used as the finish line for the Bolder Boulder, a popular 10K run.

The first Promise Keepers stadium conference was held at Folsom in June 1992.

== Attendance records ==
The largest crowd for a CU football game at Folsom Field was 54,972 in 2005, against in-state rival Colorado State on September 3, in which the Buffaloes won with a 47-yard field goal by Mason Crosby with four seconds remaining. This early-season, non-conference rivalry game, the Rocky Mountain Showdown, is more often played in neutral Denver at Mile High Stadium and its successor Empower Field at Mile High.

The largest crowd ever at Folsom Field was in 1977 for a rock concert, one of the popular Colorado Sun Day concert series. The attendance on May 1 was an estimated 61,500 (exceeding the seating capacity by about 9,000) for a show featuring Fleetwood Mac, Bob Seger, Firefall, and John Sebastian.

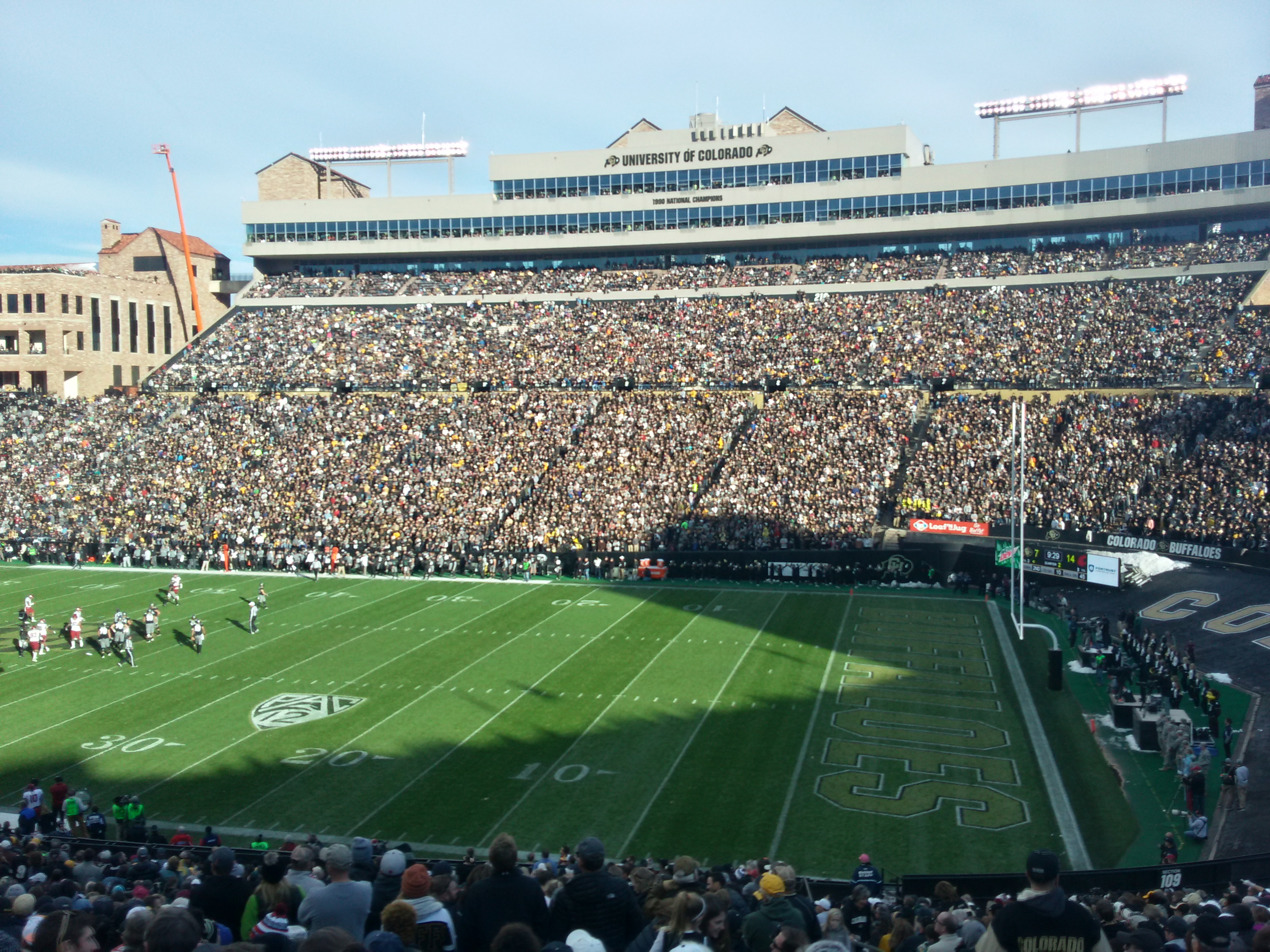
The east side of the stadium with the newer club and suite level suites; "1990 National Champions" noted between the two suite levels

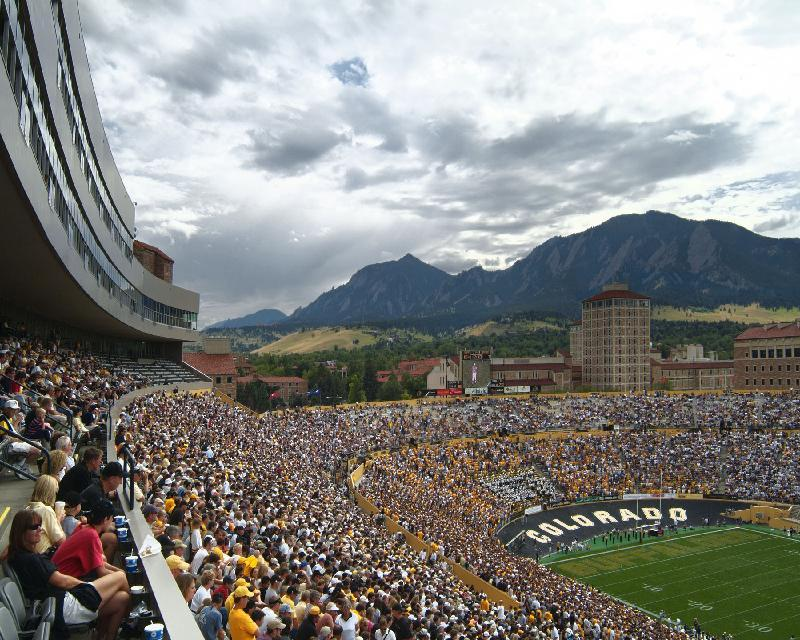
View to southwest & flatirons in 2008

Highest attendance at Folsom Field
Rank	Attendance	Date	Game result
1	54,972	September 3, 2005	Colorado 31, Colorado State 28
2	54,954	September 4, 2004	Colorado 27, Colorado State 24
3	54,841	November 25, 2005	Colorado 3, Nebraska 30
4	54,646	November 16, 2024	#17 Colorado 49, Utah 24
5	54,215	October 25, 2003	Colorado 20, #1 Oklahoma 34
6	54,063	October 28, 1995	#7 Colorado 21, #2 Nebraska 44
7	54,032	September 30, 2023	Colorado 41, #8 USC 48
8	53,972	October 12, 2024	Colorado 28, #18 Kansas State 31
9	53,927	October 4, 2008	Colorado 14, #5 Texas 38
10	53,849	September 23, 1995	#7 Colorado 29, #3 Texas A&M 21

History of attendance of Folsom Field
Season	Coach	Games	Sellouts	W-L-T	Attendance	Average
1937	Oakes	6		6–0–0	46,826	7,804
1942	Yeager	4		4–0–0	15,796	3,949
1946	Yeager	5		4–0–1	53,000	10,600
1947	Yeager	4		2–2–0	54,000	13,500
1948	Ward	5		3–2–0	79,479	15,896
1949	Ward	5		2–3–0	98,776	19,755
1950	Ward	5		4–1–0	97,748	19,550
1951	Ward	5		5–0–0	107,121	21,424
1952	Ward	5	2	3–0–2	123,481	24,696
1953	Ward	5		3–2–0	113,640	22,728
1954	Ward	5	2	3–2–0	129,700	25,940
1955	Ward	5	1	4–1–0	113,500	22,700
1956	Ward	5	2	3–2–0	175,000	35,000
1957	Ward	5		3–2–0	152,500	30,500
1958	Ward	5	1	2–3–0	187,500	37,500
1959	Grandelius	6		3–3–0	177,903	29,651
1960	Grandelius	5	1	4–1–0	185,653	37,131
1961	Grandelius	6	1	5–1–0	199,987	33,331
1962	Davis	4		2–2–0	116,000	29,000
1963	Crowder	5		1–4–0	135,000	27,000
1964	Crowder	5		1–4–0	140,600	28,120
1965	Crowder	5		3–1–1	129,700	25,940
1966	Crowder	5	1	3–2–0	196,188	39,238
1967	Crowder	5		4–1–0	196,817	39,363
1968	Crowder	5	1	3–2–0	215,574	43,115
1969	Crowder	5		5–0–0	175,104	35,021
1970	Crowder	5	1	3–2–0	219,521	43,904
1971	Crowder	5		5–0–0	220,171	44,034
1972	Crowder	6	3	5–1–0	307,044	51,174
1973	Crowder	5		3–2–0	246,521	49,304
1974	Mallory	5	2	3–2–0	253,762	50,752
1975	Mallory	6		6–0–0	281,199	46,867
1976	Mallory	6	2	5–1–0	300,191	50,032
1977	Mallory	6	2	5–1–0	293,483	48,914
1978	Mallory	8	2	5–3–0	383,048	47,881
1979	Fairbanks	6		1–5–0	265,956	44,326
1980	Fairbanks	6	1	1–5–0	245,868	40,978
1981	Fairbanks	6		3–3–0	209,224	34,871
1982	McCartney	7	1	1–6–0	287,023	41,003
1983	McCartney	6	1	3–3–0	237,674	39,612
1984	McCartney	6	1	1–5–0	235,670	39,278
1985	McCartney	6		4–2–0	220,734	36,789
1986	McCartney	6	2	3–3–0	269,546	44,924
1987	McCartney	6	1	4–2–0	268,711	44,785
1988	McCartney	6		4–2–0	235,142	39,190
1989	McCartney	6	2	6–0–0	293,726	48,954
1990	McCartney	6	4	6–0–0	310,374	51,729
1991	McCartney	6	4	4–1–1	311,458	51,910
1992	McCartney	6	4	5–0–1	309,900	51,650
1993	McCartney	6	5	4–2–0	311,360	51,893
1994	McCartney	6	3	6–0–0	304,897	50,816
1995	Neuheisel	6	4	4–2–0	312,958	52,160
1996	Neuheisel	6	4	5–1	312,586	52,098
1997	Neuheisel	6	2	3–3	309,947	51,658
1998	Neuheisel	6		5–1	284,512	47,419
1999	Barnett	5	1	4–1	239,313	47,863
2000	Barnett	5		1–4	249,950	49,990
2001	Barnett	6	1	5–1	284,848	47,475
2002	Barnett	6	2	5–1	295,286	49,214
2003	Barnett	6	2	3–3	302,588	50,431
2004	Barnett	6	1	4–2	287,368	47,895
2005	Barnett	6	2	5–1	302,452	50,409
2006	Hawkins	6		2–4	276,286	46,048
2007	Hawkins	6		3–3	303,051	50,509
2008	Hawkins	6	1	4–2	296,858	49,476
2009	Hawkins	6		3–3	300,527	50,088
2010	Hawkins	6		4–2	281,182	46,864
2011	Embree	5		1–4	251,777	50,355
2012	Embree	6		0–6	273,235	45,539
2013	MacIntyre	6		3–3	230,773	38,462
2014	MacIntyre	6		1–5	226,670	37,778
2015	MacIntyre	6		2–4	236,331	39,389
2016	MacIntyre	6	1	6–0	279,652	46,609
2017	MacIntyre	6		3–3	282,335	47,056
2018	MacIntyre	6		3–3	274,852	45,809
2019	Tucker	6	2	3–3	297,435	49,573
2020	Dorrell	3		2–1	—	—
2021	Dorrell	6		4–2	278,906	46,484
2022	Dorrell	6		1–5	257,084	42,847
2023	Sanders	6	6	2–4	319,081	53,180
2024	Sanders	6	4	5–1	315,082	52,514
2025	Sanders	7	3	3–4	353,284	50,469

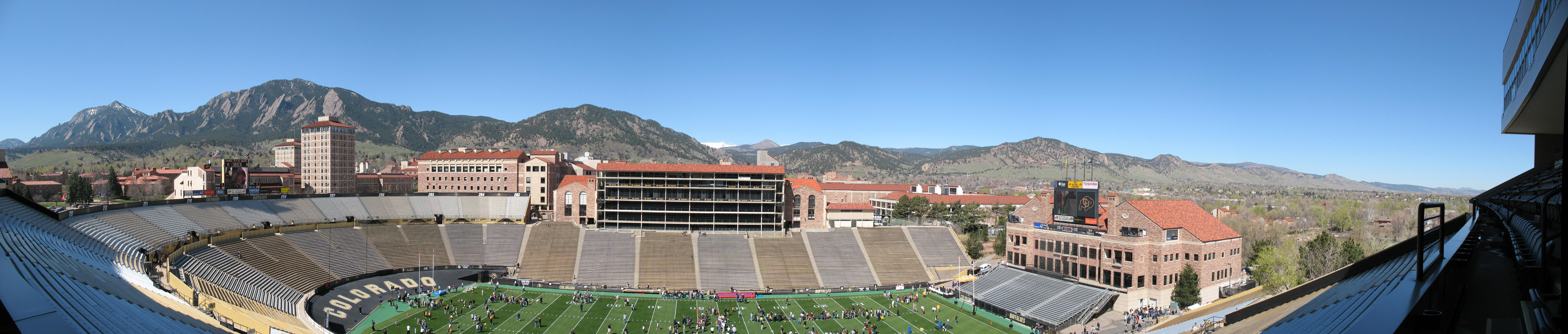
View from the club level seats before the football Spring Game on April 14, 2007

== Gallery ==
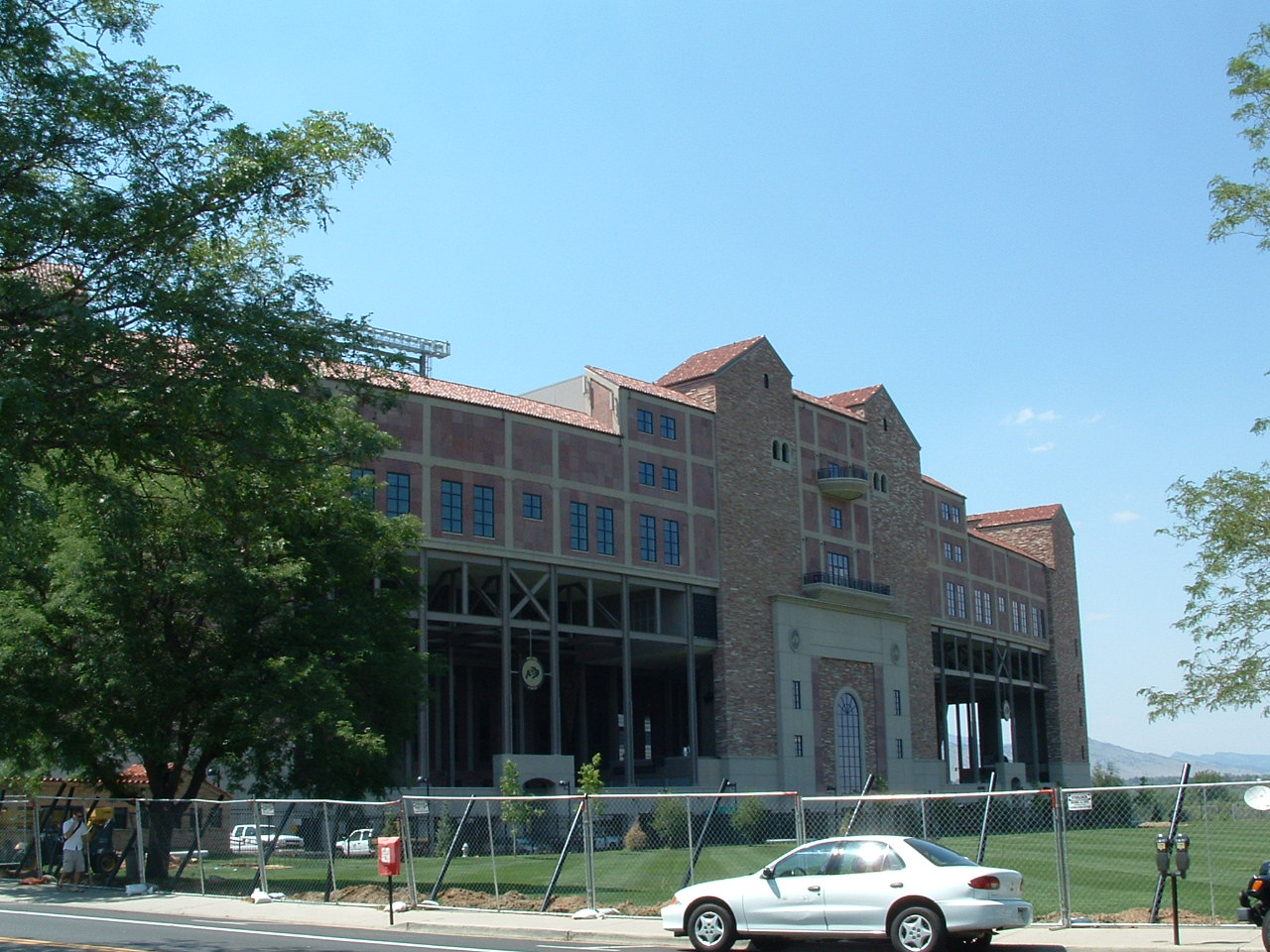
Facade built prior to 2003 season on July 13, 2006

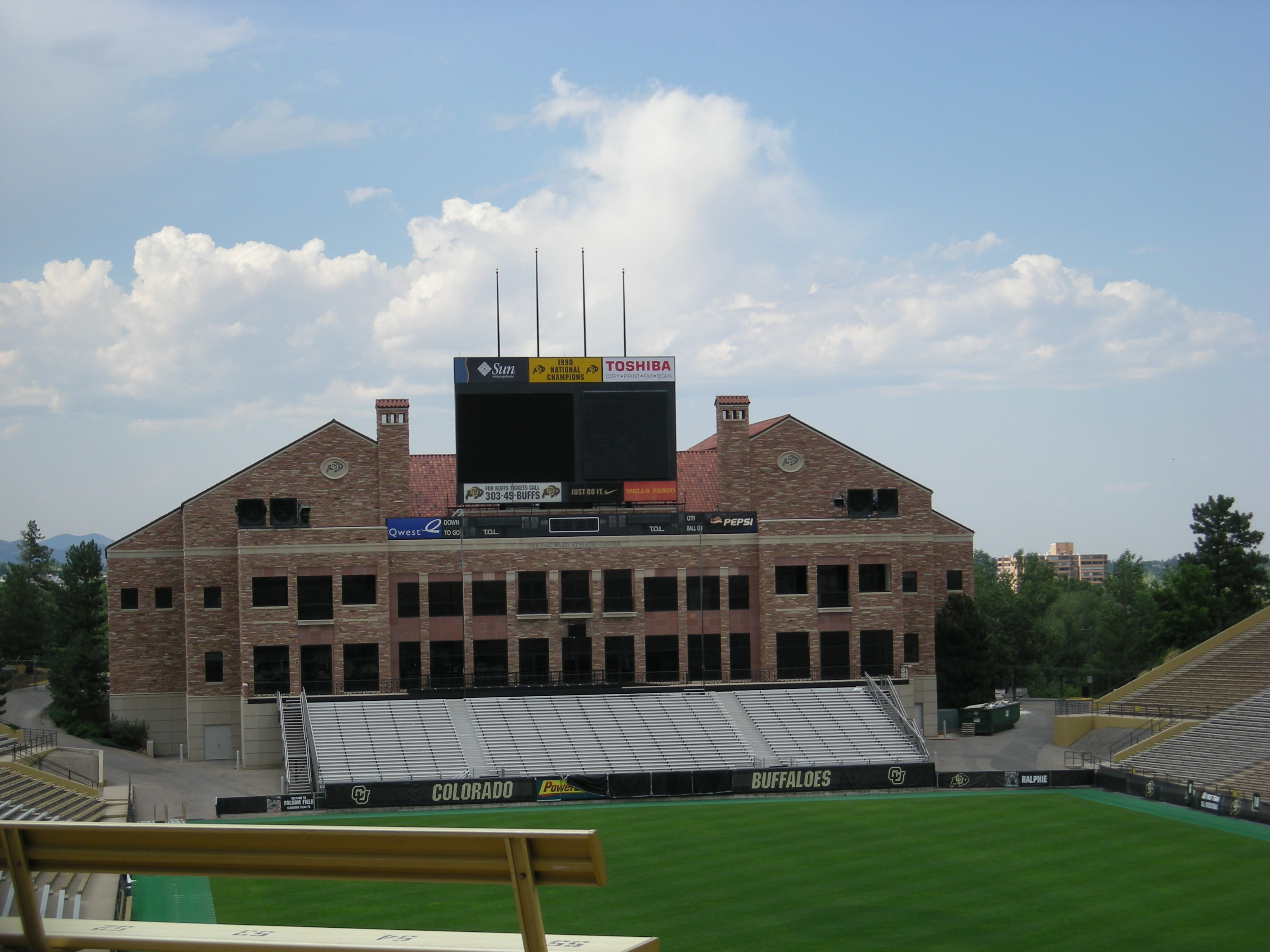
Interior view, 2007

Exterior of stadium from the south

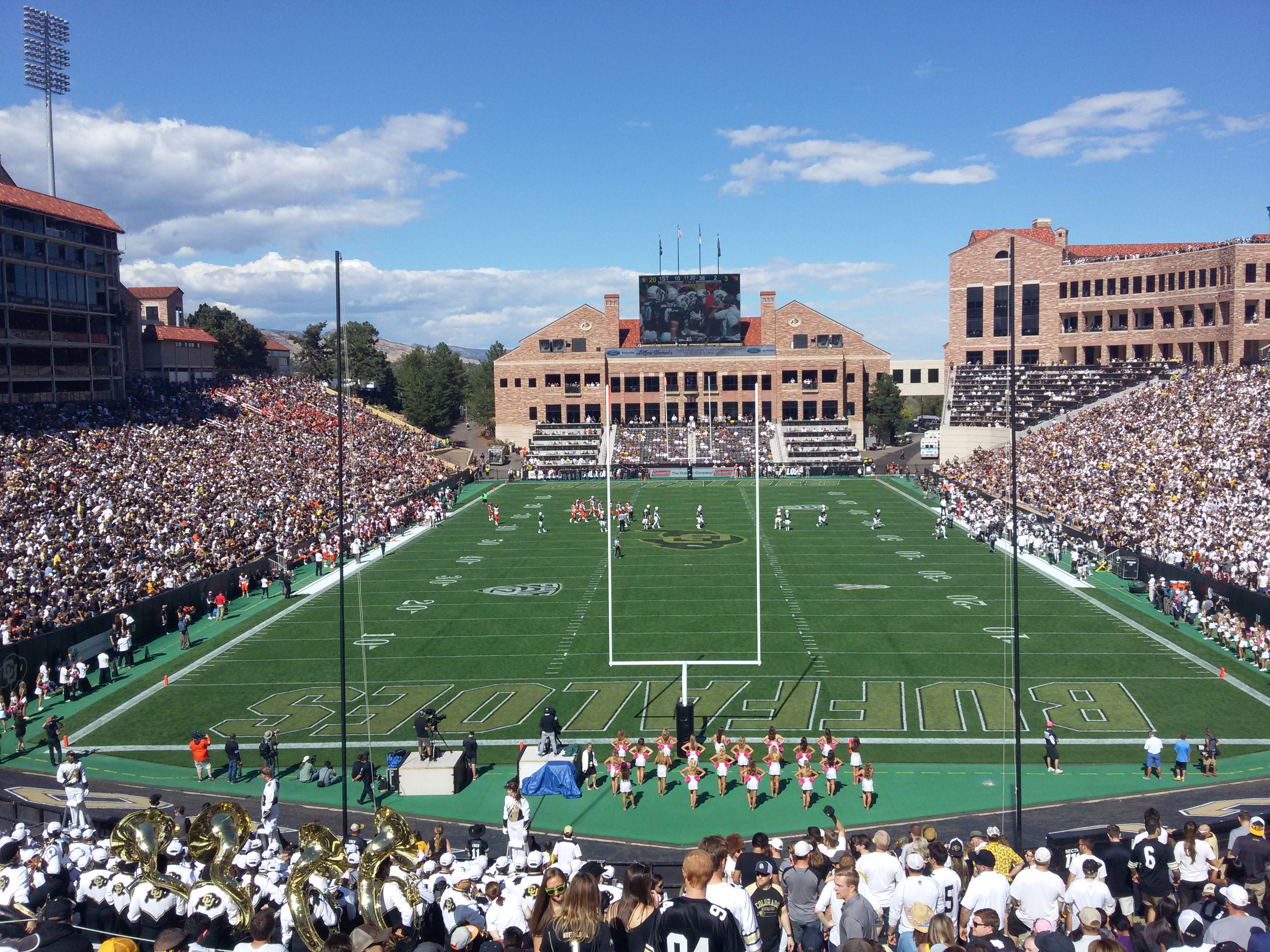
A view of the north side of the stadium in 2016

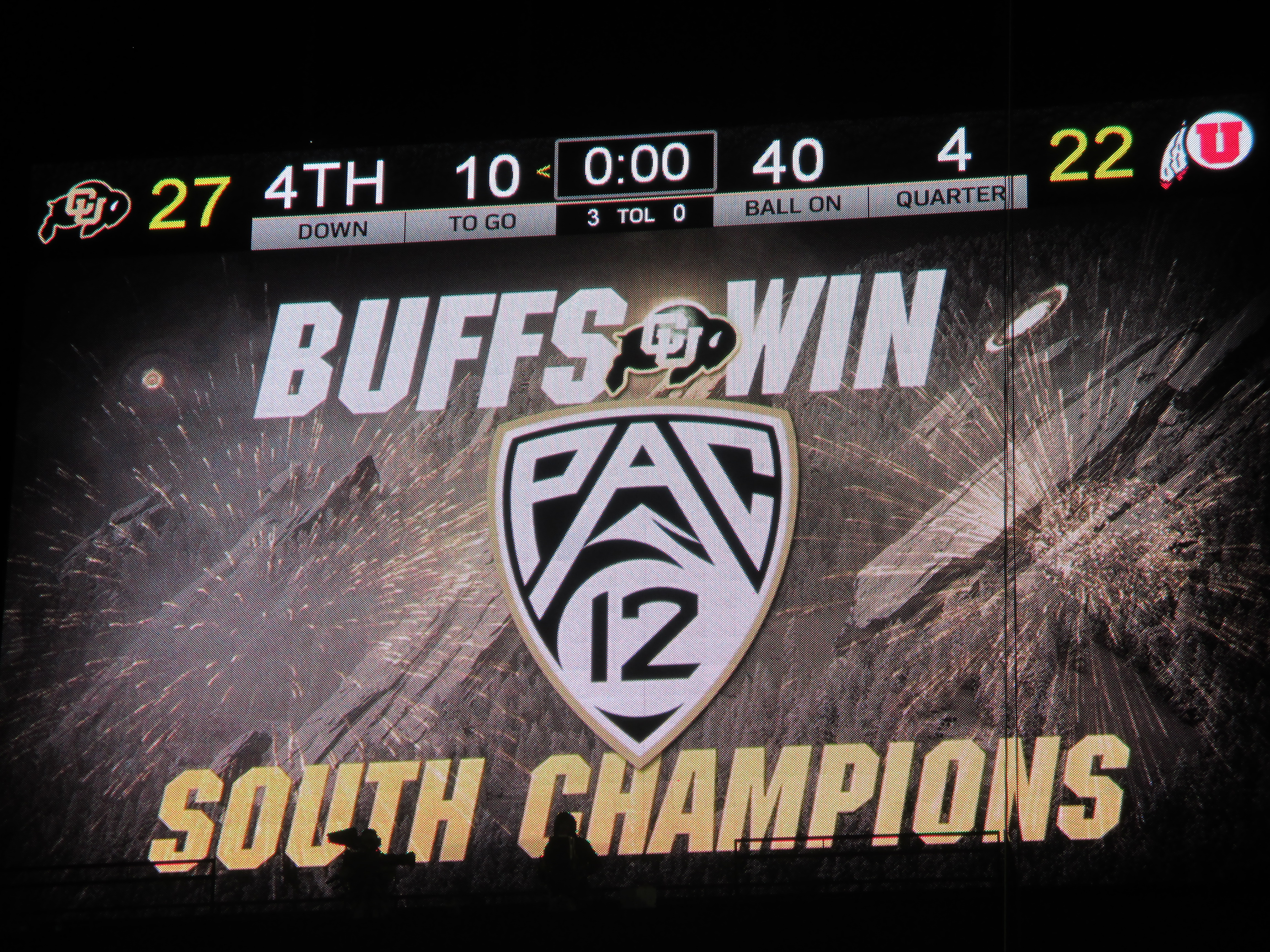
New video boards were added before the 2012 season.

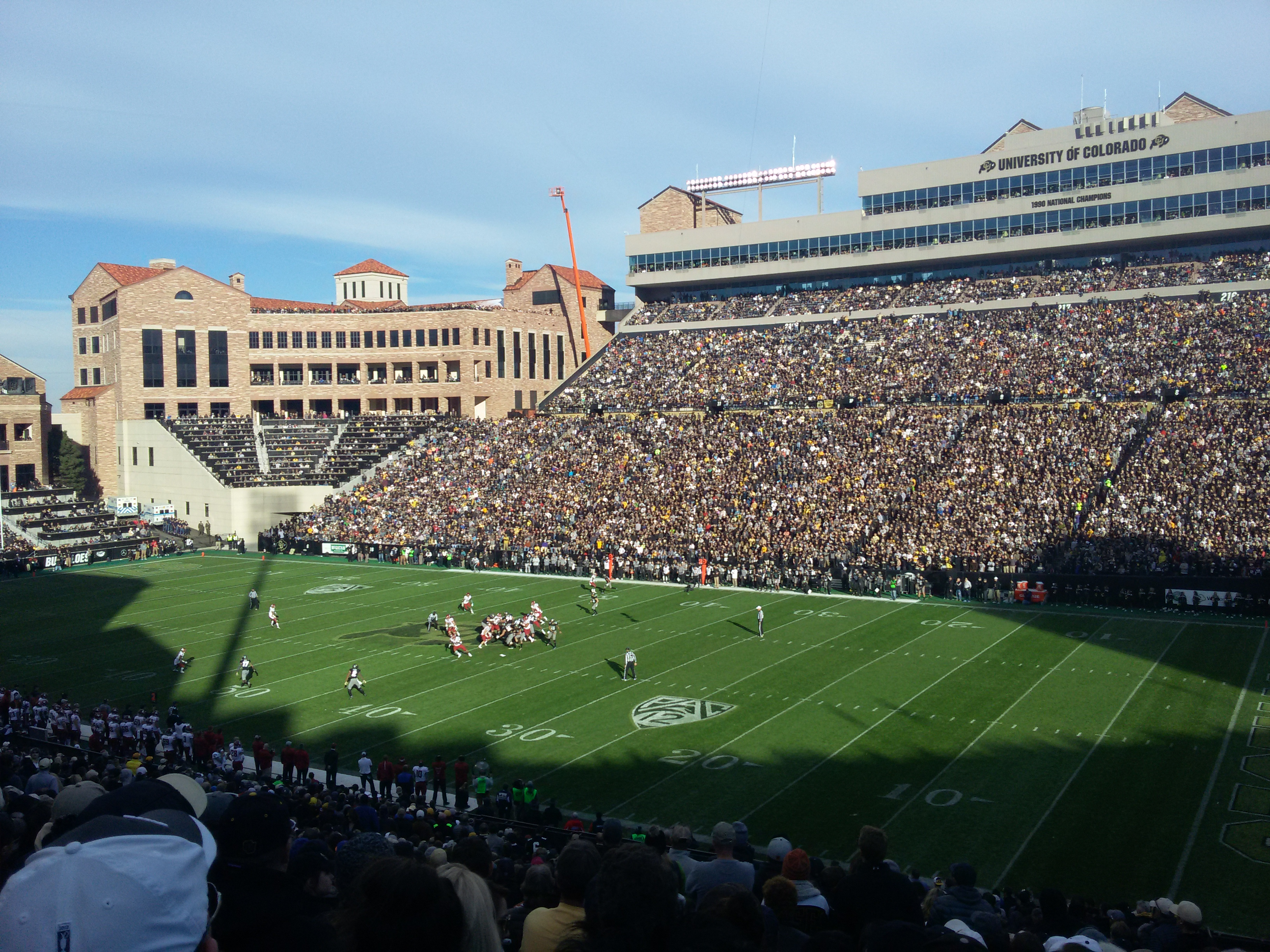
Folsom Field's east side as it looked in 2016 after the addition of the Champions Center.

== See also ==
- List of NCAA Division I FBS football stadiums
- List of American football stadiums by capacity
- Lists of stadiums
