= Dead & Company Summer Tour 2017 =

2017 concert tour by Dead & Company

- Tour by Dead & Company
- Location: United States
- Start date: May 27, 2017
- End date: July 1, 2017
- Legs: 1
- No. of shows: 20

Dead & Company concert chronology
- Dead & Company Summer Tour 2016; Dead & Company Summer Tour 2017; Dead & Company Fall Tour 2017

The Dead & Company Summer Tour 2017 was a concert tour by the rock band Dead & Company during May, June, and July 2017. It was the band’s third tour, following their 2016 tour. The Dead & Company Summer Tour 2017 took place between May 27 and July 1, 2017, comprising a total of 20 concerts in 15 different cities.

== Tour dates ==
The band performed a total of 20 concerts in 15 different U.S. cities.

Date	City	Venue	Attendance	Revenue
May 27, 2017	Las Vegas	MGM Grand Garden Arena	10,258 / 11,685	$1,052,921
May 28, 2017	Phoenix	Ak-Chin Pavilion	12,662 / 19,250	$743,518
May 31, 2017	Los Angeles	Hollywood Bowl	31,778 / 35,213	$2,931,168
June 1, 2017	Los Angeles	Hollywood Bowl	31,778 / 35,213	$2,931,168
June 3, 2017	Mountain View	Shoreline Amphitheatre	21,780 / 22,015	$1,152,715
June 4, 2017	Mountain View	Shoreline Amphitheatre	16,422 / 21,949	$968,959
June 7, 2017	West Valley City	USANA Amphitheatre	12,056 / 20,000	$694,997
June 9, 2017	Boulder	Folsom Field	55,882 / 86,982	$4,365,860
June 10, 2017	Boulder	Folsom Field	55,882 / 86,982	$4,365,860
June 13, 2017	Atlanta	Lakewood Amphitheatre	18,623 / 18,923	$921,460
June 15, 2017	Burgettstown	KeyBank Pavilion	13,514 / 23,472	$689,530
June 17, 2017	Boston	Fenway Park	57,665 / 60,185	$4,891,788
June 18, 2017	Boston	Fenway Park	57,665 / 60,185	$4,891,788
June 20, 2017	Saratoga Springs	Saratoga Performing Arts Center	24,946 / 25,462	$1,210,440
June 22, 2017	Bristow	Jiffy Lube Live	19,137 / 23,313	$1,196,073
June 24, 2017	New York City	Citi Field	27,299 / 27,299	$4,032,321
June 25, 2017	Camden	BB&T Pavilion	25,153 / 25,485	$1,277,555
June 28, 2017	Cuyahoga Falls	Blossom Music Center	20,651 / 20,963	$1,073,705
June 30, 2017	Chicago	Wrigley Field	79,489 / 86,856	$6,357,746
July 1, 2017	Chicago	Wrigley Field	79,489 / 86,856	$6,357,746

== Musicians ==
- Mickey Hart – drums, percussion
- Bill Kreutzmann – drums
- John Mayer – lead guitar, lead/backing vocals
- Bob Weir – rhythm guitar, lead/backing vocals
- Oteil Burbridge – bass guitar, percussion, lead/backing vocals
- Jeff Chimenti – keyboards, backing vocals

== See also ==
- Reunions of the Grateful Dead
