= Dead & Company Fall Tour 2017 =

2017 concert tour by Dead & Company

- Tour by Dead & Company
- Location: United States
- Start date: November 9, 2017
- End date: December 8, 2017
- Legs: 1
- No. of shows: 15

Dead & Company concert chronology
- Dead & Company Summer Tour 2017; Dead & Company Fall Tour 2017; Dead & Company Summer Tour 2018

The Dead & Company Fall Tour 2017 is a concert tour by the rock band Dead & Company during November and December 2017. It is the band’s fourth tour, following their 2017 Summer Tour. The tour comprises a total of 15 concerts in 14 different cities between November 12 and February 27, 2018 (originally December 8, 2017 prior to some shows being postponed).

Prior to the Fall Tour, the band performed a six-song, 70-minute set at the Band Together Bay Area benefit concert for victims of the 2017 California wildfires. The concert took place on November 9, 2017 at AT&T Park in San Francisco.

== Tour dates ==
The tour consists of total of 16 concerts in 14 different U.S. cities. Due to guitarist John Mayer requiring an emergency appendectomy, the final three concerts — in New Orleans, Sunrise, Florida, and Orlando, Florida — were rescheduled to February 24, 26, and 27, 2018, respectively.

Date	City	Venue	Attendance	Revenue
November 12, 2017	New York City	Madison Square Garden	34,735 / 34,735	$3,990,317
November 14, 2017	New York City	Madison Square Garden	34,735 / 34,735	$3,990,317
November 16, 2017	Philadelphia	Wells Fargo Center		
November 17, 2017	Boston	TD Garden		
November 19, 2017	Boston	TD Garden		
November 21, 2017	Washington, D.C.	Capital One Arena	12,234 / 13,780	$1,342,526
November 22, 2017	Hartford	XL Center		
November 24, 2017	Detroit	Little Caesars Arena		
November 25, 2017	Columbus	Nationwide Arena		
November 28, 2017	Charlotte	Spectrum Center		
November 29, 2017	Atlanta	Philips Arena	9,815 / 10,083	$1,052,383
December 1, 2017	Dallas	American Airlines Center	10,713 / 13,060	$1,188,752
December 2, 2017	Austin	Frank Erwin Center	11,700 / 12,070	$1,479,555
February 24, 2018 (rescheduled; originally December 5, 2017)	New Orleans	Smoothie King Center	11,828 / 12,455	$1,161,544
February 26, 2018 (rescheduled; originally December 8, 2017)	Sunrise	BB&T Center	12,437 / 12,848	$1,365,862
February 27, 2018 (rescheduled; originally December 7, 2017)	Orlando	Amway Center	11,069 / 12,994	$1,148,448

== Setlists ==
=== November 12, 2017 ===
First set:

- "Shakedown Street" (Jerry Garcia, Robert Hunter) – 13:02 →
- "Greatest Story Ever Told" (Bob Weir, Mickey Hart, Hunter) – 5:35
- "Bertha" (Garcia, Hunter) – 9:33
- "Cassidy" (Weir, John Perry Barlow) – 12:13
- "Beat It On Down the Line" (Jesse Fuller) – 3:53
- "They Love Each Other" (Garcia, Hunter) – 10:08
- "Cumberland Blues" (Garcia, Phil Lesh, Hunter) – 9:51

Second set:

- "China Cat Sunflower" (Garcia, Hunter) – 9:10 →
- "I Know You Rider" (traditional) – 8:52
- "Ship of Fools" (Garcia, Hunter) – 8:09 →
- "Terrapin Station" (Garcia, Hunter) – 13:18 →
- "Drums" (Hart, Bill Kreutzmann) – 12:35 →
- "Space" (Oteil Burbridge, Jeff Chimenti, John Mayer, Weir) – 3:31 →
- "Standing on the Moon" (Garcia, Hunter) – 10:03 →
- "The Other One" (Weir, Kreutzmann) – 11:33 →
- "Casey Jones" (Garcia, Hunter) – 7:39

First encore:

- "Samson & Delilah" (traditional) – 7:37

Second encore:

- "Werewolves of London" (Warren Zevon) – 7:04

=== November 14, 2017 ===
First set:

- "Hell in a Bucket" (Weir, Brent Mydland, Barlow) – 11:18
- "Cold Rain & Snow" (traditional) – 8:20
- "Me and My Uncle" (John Philips) – 6:40
- "Brown-Eyed Women" (Garcia, Hunter) – 7:27
- "Tennessee Jed" (Garcia, Hunter) – 10:06
- "Bird Song" (Garcia, Hunter) – 16:37
- "Man Smart, Woman Smarter" (Norman Span) – 7:49

Second set:

- "Help on the Way" (Garcia, Hunter) – 6:39 →
- "Slipknot!" (Garcia, Keith Godchaux, Kreutzmann, Lesh, Weir) – 6:11 →
- "Franklin's Tower" (Garcia, Kreutzmann, Hunter) – 10:09
- "China Doll" (Garcia, Hunter) – 9:08
- "Estimated Prophet" (Weir, Barlow) – 16:26 →
- "Drums" (Hart, Kreutzmann) – 9:50 →
- "Space" (Burbridge, Chimenti, Mayer, Weir) – 6:09 →
- "A Love Supreme" (John Coltrane) – 2:32 →
- "Stella Blue" (Garcia, Hunter) – 10:59
- "St. Stephen" (Garcia, Lesh, Hunter) – 13:28 →
- "Not Fade Away" (Charles Hardin, Norman Petty) – 10:59

Encore:

- "U.S. Blues" (Garcia, Hunter) – 7:37

=== November 16, 2017 ===
First set:

- "Dancin' in the Streets" (Marvin Gaye, William "Mickey" Stevenson, Ivy Jo Hunter) – 14:57 →
- "Ramble on Rose" (Garcia, Hunter) – 9:24
- "Row Jimmy" (Garcia, Hunter) – 10:39
- "Friend of the Devil" (Garcia, John Dawson, Hunter) – 7:45
- "New Minglewood Blues" (traditional) – 9:21 →
- "West L.A. Fadeaway" (Garcia, Hunter) – 9:32 →
- "Let it Grow" (Weir, Barlow) – 13:57

Second set:

- "Dark Star" (Garcia, Hart, Kreutzmann, Lesh, Ron "Pigpen" McKernan, Weir, Hunter) – 28:42 →
- "Truckin'" (Garcia, Lesh, Weir, Hunter) – 8:43 →
- "Smokestack Lightnin'" (Chester Burnett) – 4:30 →
- "Deal" (Garcia, Hunter) – 11:54 →
- "Eyes of the World" (Garcia, Hunter) – 17:26 →
- "Drums" (Hart, Kreutzmann) – 7:53 →
- "Space" (Burbridge, Chimenti, Mayer, Weir) – 2:07 →
- "Dear Prudence" (John Lennon, Paul McCartney) – 9:27 →
- "Uncle John's Band" (Garcia, Hunter) – 10:37 →
- "Goin' Down the Road Feeling Bad" (traditional) – 9:14

Encore:

- "Black Muddy River" (Garcia, Hunter) – 9:02

=== November 17, 2017 ===
First set:

- "Jack Straw" (Weir, Hunter) – 11:07 →
- "New Speedway Boogie" (Garcia, Hunter) – 10:48
- "Althea" (Garcia, Hunter) – 10:24
- "Mississippi Half-Step Uptown Toodeloo" (Garcia, Hunter) – 12:35 →
- "Big River" (Johnny Cash) – 7:04
- "Sugaree" (Garcia, Hunter) – 13:58
- "The Music Never Stopped" (Weir, Barlow) – 10:11

Second set:

- "Scarlet Begonias" (Garcia, Hunter) – 10:51 →
- "Fire on the Mountain" (Hart, Hunter) – 9:51 →
- "He's Gone" (Garcia, Hunter) – 12:48 →
- "Viola Lee Blues" (Lewis) – 8:05 →
- "Drums" (Hart, Kreutzmann) – 8:37 →
- "Space" (Burbridge, Chimenti, Mayer, Weir) – 6:15 →
- "Milestones" (Miles Davis) – 5:46 →
- "Wharf Rat" (Garcia, Hunter) – 10:16 →
- "The Wheel" (Garcia, Kreutzmann, Hunter) – 10:48 →
- "Sugar Magnolia" (Weir, Hunter) – 10:36

Encore:

- "Ripple" (Garcia, Hunter) – 5:15

=== November 19, 2017 ===
First set:

- "Samson & Delilah" (traditional) – 7:52
- "Dire Wolf" (Garcia, Hunter) – 6:04
- "Cold Rain & Snow" (traditional) – 7:52
- "Loser" (Garcia, Hunter) – 9:53
- "Corrina" (Weir, Hart, Hunter) – 10:22
- "Here Comes Sunshine" (Garcia, Hunter) – 11:17
- "Greatest Story Ever Told" (Weir, Hart, Hunter) – 5:54

Second set:

- "China Cat Sunflower" (Garcia, Hunter) – 8:07 →
- "I Know You Rider" (traditional) – 10:28
- "Comes a Time" (Garcia, Hunter) – 10:01
- "Playing in the Band" (Weir, Hart, Hunter) – 18:57 →
- "Drums" (Hart, Kreutzmann) – 6:09 →
- "Space" (Burbridge, Chimenti, Mayer, Weir) – 6:18 →
- "Morning Dew" (Bonnie Dobson) – 12:14
- "I Need a Miracle" (Weir, Barlow) – 5:28 →
- "Casey Jones" (Garcia, Hunter) – 8:17

Encore:

- "Brokedown Palace" (Garcia, Hunter) – 5:18 →
- "Playing in the Band" (Weir, Hart, Hunter) – 6:51

=== November 21, 2017 ===
First set:

- "Feel Like a Stranger" (Weir, Barlow) – 12:19
- "Bertha" (Garcia, Hunter) – 9:03 →
- "Black-Throated Wind" (Weir, Barlow) – 8:11
- "Tennessee Jed" (Garcia, Hunter) – 8:59
- "Ship of Fools" (Garcia, Hunter) – 9:22
- "Cassidy" (Weir, Barlow) – 12:09
- "Deal" (Garcia, Hunter) – 10:41

Second set:

- "Help on the Way" (Garcia, Hunter) – 5:40 →
- "Slipknot!" (Garcia, K. Godchaux, Kreutzmann, Lesh, Weir) – 9:13 →
- "Franklin's Tower" (Garcia, Kreutzmann, Hunter) – 10:51 →
- "Looks Like Rain" (Weir, Barlow) – 10:06 →
- "Terrapin Station" (Garcia, Hunter) – 12:06 →
- "Drums" (Hart, Kreutzmann) – 9:32 →
- "Space" (Burbridge, Chimenti, Mayer, Weir) – 5:42 →
- "Days Between" (Garcia, Hunter) – 13:20 →
- "Throwing Stones" (Weir, Barlow) – 11:53

Encore:

- "Touch of Grey" (Garcia, Hunter) – 7:45

=== November 22, 2017 ===
First set:

- "Iko Iko" (James "Sugar Boy" Crawford) – 9:51
- "Shakedown Street" (Garcia, Hunter) – 11:19 →
- "They Love Each Other" (Garcia, Hunter) – 13:05 →
- "Loose Lucy" (Garcia, Hunter) – 9:28
- "Friend of the Devil" (Garcia, Dawson, Hunter) – 7:29
- "Bird Song" (Garcia, Hunter) – 14:53

Second set

- "Estimated Prophet" (Weir, Barlow) – 16:33 →
- "Eyes of the World" (Garcia, Hunter) – 17:54
- "China Doll" (Garcia, Hunter) – 9:06
- "The Other One" (Weir, Kreutzmann) – 9:09 →
- "Drums" (Hart, Kreutzmann) – 7:07 →
- "Space" (Burbridge, Chimenti, Mayer, Weir) – 2:35 →
- "Spanish Jam" (Burbridge, Chimenti, Mayer, Weir) – 2:28 →
- "Black Peter" (Garcia, Hunter) – 15:37 →
- "Uncle John's Band" (Garcia, Hunter) – 11:33 →
- "U.S. Blues" (Garcia, Hunter) – 7:35

Encore:

- "Knockin' on Heaven's Door" (Dylan) – 8:02

=== November 24, 2017 ===
First set:

- "Dancin' in the Streets" (Stevenson, Gaye, I.J. Hunter) – 12:15
- "Jack Straw" (Weir, Hunter) – 8:17
- "Brown-Eyed Women" (Garcia, Hunter) – 8:17
- "Ramble on Rose" (Garcia, Hunter) – 8:06
- "Deep Elem Blues" (traditional) – 7:50
- "Beat it on Down the Line" (Fuller) – 4:28
- "Sugaree" (Garcia, Hunter) – 14:28

Second set:

- "New Speedway Boogie" (Garcia, Hunter) – 10:13 →
- "Dark Star" (Garcia, Hart, Kreutzmann, Lesh, McKernan, Weir, Hunter) – 14:59 →
- "Scarlet Begonias" (Garcia, Hunter) – 8:58 →
- "Fire on the Mountain" (Hart, Hunter) – 9:44 →
- "Drums" (Hart, Kreutzmann) – 6:36 →
- "Space" (Burbridge, Chimenti, Mayer, Weir) – 3:52 →
- "A Hard Rain's A-Gonna Fall" (Dylan) – 10:44 →
- "The Wheel" (Garcia, Kreutzmann, Hunter) – 10:41 →
- "Not Fade Away" (Hardin, Petty) – 7:57

Encore:

- "Casey Jones" (Garcia, Hunter) – 7:11

=== November 25, 2017 ===
First set:

- "Cold Rain & Snow" (traditional) – 8:12
- "The Music Never Stopped" (Weir, Barlow) – 9:25
- "Row Jimmy" (Garcia, Hunter) – 10:26
- "Me and My Uncle" (Philips) – 4:30 →
- "Cumberland Blues" (Garcia, Lesh, Hunter) – 10:52
- "Althea" (Garcia, Hunter) – 12:36
- "One More Saturday Night" (Weir) – 5:40

Second set:

- "St. Stephen" (Garcia, Lesh, Hunter) – 15:09 →
- "He's Gone" (Garcia, Hunter) – 11:33 →
- "China Cat Sunflower" (Garcia, Hunter) – 5:43 →
- "If I Had the World to Give" (Garcia, Hunter) – 7:13 →
- "I Know You Rider" (traditional) – 12:25 →
- "Drums" (Hart, Kreutzmann) – 10:46 →
- "Space" (Burbridge, Chimenti, Mayer, Weir) – 9:03 →
- "Stella Blue" (Garcia, Hunter) – 10:43 →
- "All Along the Watchtower" (Dylan) – 7:35 →
- "Sugar Magnolia" (Weir, Hunter) – 11:27

Encore:

- "Ripple" (Garcia, Hunter) – 5:28

=== November 28, 2017 ===
First set:

- "Hell in a Bucket" (Weir, Barlow) – 11:00
- "Bertha" (Garcia, Hunter) – 9:30
- "Peggy-O" (traditional) – 7:54
- "When I Paint My Masterpiece" (Dylan) – 7:39
- "Greatest Story Ever Told" (Weir, Hart, Hunter) – 9:08
- "Ship of Fools" (Garcia, Hunter) – 8:59
- "Mississippi Half-Step Uptown Toodeloo" (Garcia, Hunter) – 13:10 →
- "Let it Grow" (Weir, Barlow) – 14:17

Second set:

- "The Weight" (Robertson) – 6:49
- "Playing in the Band" (Weir, Hart, Hunter) – 13:24 →
- "Uncle John's Band" (Garcia, Hunter) – 14:24 →
- "Terrapin Station" (Garcia, Hunter) – 13:34 →
- "Drums" (Hart, Kreutzmann) – 9:52 →
- "Space" (Burbridge, Chimenti, Mayer, Weir) – 3:57 →
- "Standing on the Moon" (Garcia, Hunter) – 10:11 →
- "I Need a Miracle" (Weir, Barlow) – 7:40 →
- "Goin' Down the Road Feeling Bad" (traditional) – 10:39

Encore:

- "Black Muddy River" (Garcia, Hunter) – 6:30 →
- "Playing in the Band" (Weir, Hart, Hunter) – 4:52

=== November 29, 2017 ===
First set:

- "Truckin'" (Garcia, Lesh, Weir, Hunter) – 12:32 →
- "Smokestack Lightnin'" (Burnett) – 3:55
- "Feel Like a Stranger" (Weir, Barlow) – 13:05
- "Dire Wolf" (Garcia, Hunter) – 6:03
- "Loser" (Garcia, Hunter) – 10:40
- "Cassidy" (Weir, Barlow) – 11:07
- "Bird Song" (Garcia, Hunter) – 13:14 →
- "Deal" (Garcia, Hunter) – 11:38

Second set:

- "Help on the Way" (Garcia, Hunter) – 6:02 →
- "Slipknot!" (Garcia, K. Godchaux, Kreutzmann, Lesh, Weir) – 7:59 →
- "Franklin's Tower (Garcia, Kreutzmann, Hunter) – 11:11
- "Comes a Time" (Garcia, Hunter) – 9:36
- "Viola Lee Blues" (Lewis) – 9:47 →
- "Drums" (Burbridge, Hart, Kreutzmann) – 8:26 →
- "Space" (Burbridge, Chimenti, Mayer, Weir) – 5:56 →
- "Wharf Rat" (Garcia, Hunter) – 10:23 →
- "Throwing Stones" (Weir, Barlow) – 10:48 →
- "U.S. Blues" (Garcia, Hunter) – 8:38

Encore:

- "Brokedown Palace" (Garcia, Hunter) – 6:24

=== December 1, 2017 ===
First set:

- "Shakedown Street" (Garcia, Hunter) – 14:24
- "Brown-Eyed Women" (Garcia, Hunter) – 8:03
- "Deep Elem Blues" (traditional) – 9:34
- "Friend of the Devil" (Garcia, Dawson, Hunter) – 7:31
- "El Paso" (Robbins) – 6:17
- "They Love Each Other" (Garcia, Hunter) – 10:45
- "The Music Never Stopped" (Weir, Barlow) – 7:02 →
- "Easy Answers" (Weir, Vince Welnick, Bob Bralove, Rob Wasserman, Hunter) – 9:39 →
- "The Music Never Stopped" (Weir, Barlow) – 2:36

Second set:

- "Here Comes Sunshine" (Garcia, Hunter) – 11:16
- "Scarlet Begonias" (Garcia, Hunter) – 9:45 →
- "Fire on the Mountain" (Hart, Hunter) – 12:11 →
- "Eyes of the World" (Garcia, Hunter) – 16:51 →
- "Drums" (Hart, Kreutzmann) – 9:40 →
- "Space" (Burbridge, Chimenti, Mayer, Weir) – 5:33 →
- "Dear Prudence" (Lennon, McCartney) – 10:35 →
- "The Wheel" (Garcia, Kreutzmann, Hunter) – 9:48 →
- "Casey Jones" (Garcia, Hunter) – 8:33

Encore:

- "Knockin' on Heaven's Door" (Dylan) – 7:00

=== December 2, 2017 ===
First set:

- "Jack Straw" (Weir, Hunter) – 13:20
- "Cold Rain & Snow" (traditional) – 8:46
- "New Minglewood Blues" (traditional) – 9:45
- "Next Time You See Me" (Earl Forest, Bill Harvey) – 5:46
- "Ramble on Rose" (Garcia, Hunter) – 8:34
- "If I Had the World to Give" (Garcia, Hunter) – 6:32
- "Sugaree" (Garcia, Hunter) – 14:04

Second set:

- "China Cat Sunflower" (Garcia, Hunter) – 9:54 →
- "I Know You Rider" (traditional) – 10:12
- "Dark Star" (Garcia, Hart, Kreutzmann, Lesh, McKernan, Weir, Hunter) – 16:35 →
- "The Other One" (Weir, Kreutzmann) – 9:40 →
- "Drums" (Hart, Kreutzmann) – 9:48 →
- "Space" (Burbridge, Chimenti, Mayer, Weir) – 7:21 →
- "Uncle John's Band" (Garcia, Hunter) – 15:42
- "St. Stephen" (Garcia, Lesh, Weir) – 10:42 →
- "Morning Dew" (Dobson) – 12:47

Encore:

- "One More Saturday Night" (Weir) – 5:52

== Musicians ==
- Mickey Hart – drums, percussion
- Bill Kreutzmann – drums
- John Mayer – lead guitar, lead/backing vocals
- Bob Weir – rhythm guitar, lead/backing vocals
- Oteil Burbridge – bass guitar, percussion, lead/backing vocals
- Jeff Chimenti – keyboards, backing & occasional lead vocals

== See also ==
- Reunions of the Grateful Dead
