= Dead & Company 2015 Tour =

2015 concert tour by Dead & Company

- Tour by Dead & Company
- 2015 concert tour poster
- Location: United States
- Start date: October 29, 2015
- End date: December 31, 2015
- Legs: 2
- No. of shows: 22

Dead & Company concert chronology
- Dead & Company 2015 Tour; Dead & Company Summer Tour 2016

The Dead & Company 2015 Tour was a tour by the band Dead & Company that took place between October and December 2015. It was the band's debut tour.

== Overview ==
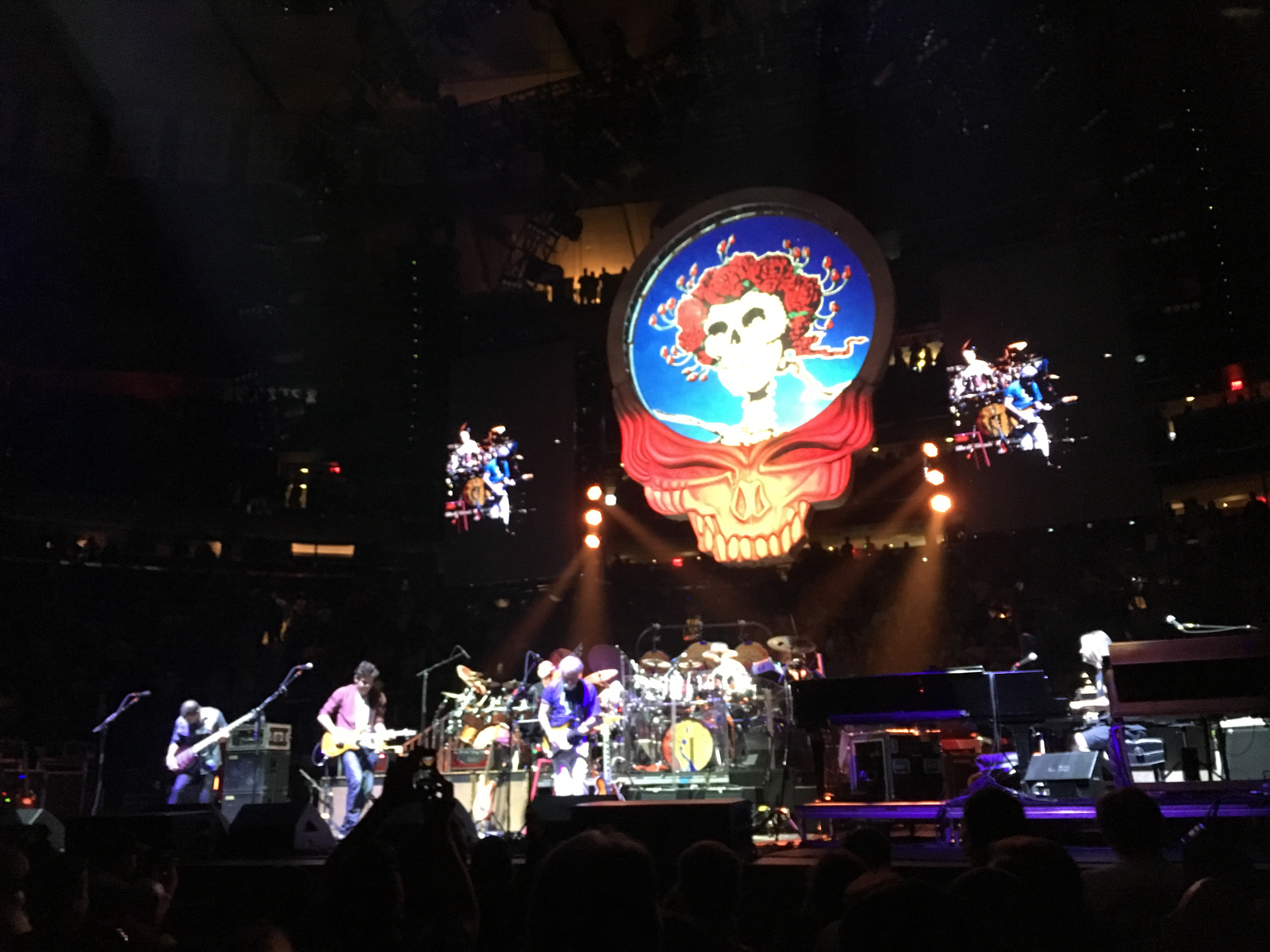
Dead & Company at Madison Square Garden on November 1, 2015

Following the surviving Grateful Dead members' successful Fare Thee Well concerts during the summer of 2015 Bob Weir, Bill Kreutzmann and Mickey Hart formed a band called Dead & Company with John Mayer, Jeff Chimenti and Oteil Burbridge. The tour was sponsored by American Express.

The band initially announced one concert for October 31 at Madison Square Garden in New York City. Following the presale for that show they announced another show at Madison Square Garden for the following night. On August 24 a full ten date tour was announced. The tour was extended to include a total of 21 dates on September 10. One additional concert at Madison Square Garden was later announced for November 7. This was a free show and was filmed and broadcast as part of the American Express Unstaged series. Fans were given the opportunity to win tickets through the band's website. Additional tickets were also given away by John Mayer's fan forum and by HeadCount outside of Madison Square Garden at the band's November 1 show.

== Reception ==
The tour was very well-received, with The New York Times referring to its "tremendous success" and Billboard calling the shows "magical". Mayer's playing was particularly praised; a review of the 11/21 Minneapolis show said that since original Grateful Dead lead guitarist Jerry Garcia's passing, "there's been no finer 'Jerry' than the uber-talented Mayer".

== Tour dates ==
The band performed 22 concerts in sixteen cities.

Date	City	Country	Venue	Tickets sold / Available	Revenue
October 29, 2015	Albany	United States	Times Union Center	12,648 / 15,258	$999,667
October 31, 2015	New York City	United States	Madison Square Garden	—	—
November 1, 2015	New York City	United States	Madison Square Garden	—	—
November 5, 2015	Philadelphia	United States	Wells Fargo Center	17,863 / 17,863	$1,461,285
November 6, 2015	Washington, D.C.	United States	Verizon Center	—	—
November 7, 2015	New York City	United States	Madison Square Garden	(free show)	—
November 10, 2015	Worcester	United States	DCU Center	13,942 / 13,942	$1,042,557
November 11, 2015	Buffalo	United States	First Niagara Center	—	—
November 13, 2015	Columbus	United States	Nationwide Arena	—	—
November 14, 2015	Greensboro	United States	Greensboro Coliseum	—	—
November 17, 2015	Atlanta	United States	Philips Arena	12,037 / 12,783	$953,506
November 18, 2015	Nashville	United States	Bridgestone Arena	10,082 / 11,760	$690,524
November 20, 2015	St. Louis	United States	Scottrade Center	11,066 / 13,706	$953,560
November 21, 2015	Minneapolis	United States	Target Center	8,222 / 11,896	$715,125
November 24, 2015	Broomfield	United States	1stBank Center	—	—
November 25, 2015	Broomfield	United States	1stBank Center	—	—
November 27, 2015	Paradise	United States	MGM Grand Garden Arena	—	—
November 28, 2015	Paradise	United States	MGM Grand Garden Arena	—	—
December 27, 2015	San Francisco	United States	Bill Graham Civic Auditorium	17,032 / 17,032	$1,277,400
December 28, 2015	San Francisco	United States	Bill Graham Civic Auditorium	17,032 / 17,032	$1,277,400
December 30, 2015	Inglewood	United States	The Forum	30,852 / 30,852	$2,850,192
December 31, 2015	Inglewood	United States	The Forum	30,852 / 30,852	$2,850,192

== Musicians ==
- Mickey Hart – drums, percussion
- Bill Kreutzmann – drums
- John Mayer – lead guitar, lead/backing vocals
- Bob Weir – rhythm guitar, lead/backing vocals
- Oteil Burbridge – bass guitar, percussion, backing vocals
- Jeff Chimenti – keyboards, backing vocals
