= Relix =

American music magazine

- Editor: Jerry Moore (1974–77); Jeff Tamarkin (1978–79); Toni Brown (1980–2002); Aeve Baldwin (2002–07); Josh Baron (2007–13); Dean Budnick and Mike Greenhaus (2013–)
- Categories: music magazine
- Frequency: 8 per year
- Founder: Les Kippel; Jerry Moore
- First issue: September 1974
- Company: Relix Media Group
- Country: United States
- Based in: New York City
- Language: English
- Website: www.relix.com
- ISSN: 0146-3489

Relix, originally and occasionally later Dead Relix, is a magazine that focuses on live and improvisational music. The magazine was launched in 1974 as a handmade newsletter devoted to connecting people who recorded Grateful Dead concerts. It rapidly expanded into a music magazine covering a wide number of artists. It is the second-longest continuously published music magazine in the United States after Rolling Stone. The magazine is published eight times a year and as of 2009, had a circulation of 102,000. Peter Shapiro currently serves as the magazine's publisher and Dean Budnick and Mike Greenhaus currently serve as Editor-in-Chief. More recently, Relix has decided to abandon their fan-first origins and focus primarily on monetizing page visits. They placed articles that had been free behind paywalls and forced users to abandon their ad blockers, which have saved many hours of grief, so that they could, instead of reporting journalism, spam users with AI-generated slop.

== Origins ==
Les Kippel, a native of Brooklyn, was the founder of the First Free Underground Grateful Dead Tape Exchange in 1971 that recorded and traded live Grateful Dead concert tapes for free. As the popularity of trading live concerts on tape increased, a practice the Grateful Dead allowed and ultimately encouraged, Kippel realized that he needed to get a more streamlined method of getting tapers together to trade.

Jerry Moore (1953–2009), a native of The Bronx who attended Lehman College, was another early taper and trader who, in the later words of Grateful Dead historian David Gans, was "almost a stereotype of the poetic Irish soul but with a bit of a psychedelic edge to his tone." (It would be Moore's high-quality audience recording of the Cornell 5/8/77 show that led to it becoming a renowned show among Deadheads and its eventual place in the National Recording Registry of the Library of Congress.)

Kippel and Moore connected through local New York-area Dead clubs and co-founded a newsletter to help his fellow tape-traders connect with each other. Jerry Moore became the first editor-in-chief of the new publication, called Dead Relix.

The first issue was released in September 1974 with an initial print run of 200. Kippel allowed a friend, who taught printing in a high school printing shop to 'use' Dead Relix to teach printing to the students.

The first issue featured a black and white drawing of a large skull in the center with a horned, winged creature below it and marijuana leaves sprouting around it. On the upper left it says: "Dedicated to the memory of the world's sneakiest tape collector—Tricky Dicky" (a reference to the then-culminating impeachment process against Richard Nixon). The issue cost $1.25. With only 50 initial subscribers, Kippel printed 200 copies. However, once word spread of the magazine, subscriptions rose quickly.

The first issue was released shortly after the Grateful Dead announced a hiatus. The timing was auspicious as Dead Relix now became the only way for Deadheads, who frequently only saw each other on tour with the band, to stay in touch and up-to-date with band and its members' happenings. The group's hiatus also created the opportunity for Dead Relix to broaden its coverage as it came to include other Dead-esque bands on the San Francisco scene like New Riders of the Purple Sage, Commander Cody and Hot Tuna.

== Transitions ==
Jerry Moore left the magazine in 1977, but in later years resurfaced as a presence in the East Coast scene until his death in 2009.

In 1978, Relix underwent a major transition that propelled it from more of a newsletter to a true magazine. The change started with a new editor, Jeff Tamarkin, who held that position during 1978 and 1979. Tamarkin had bigger plans for Relix. He felt it needed to branch out and he wanted to broaden the coverage to include more different types of music—punk, metal, new wave, even pop. Kippel gave him free rein to expand as he wanted. Dead was dropped from the title and the subject matter changed dramatically. The result was a greater readership and many angry Deadheads. Kippel attempted to appease the worries of Relix's longtime supporters in a letter from the publisher in the Jan/Feb 1979 issue. He wrote:

The key to all this is that as people who live for and by music, we should see and listen to other music, and that is the purpose and function of RELIX: to be the eyes and ears for our readers, and to report back and show and tell you, our readers what's going on around the music scene WITH AN OPEN MIND and we at RELIX do hope that you, our readers, will have an open mind for music.

In 1979, the Blues Brothers, The Who, and even Blondie appeared on the cover. However, the Grateful Dead were never too far removed from Relix as pictures and interviews with the Dead still appeared in the magazine just with less frequency. Tamarkin's tenure with Relix was brief, lasting only two years (today, he remains a contributing editor). His replacement was Toni Brown. While Brown appreciated Tamarkin's adjustments to the magazine, she recognized that Relix was straying from its Deadhead roots. Her first act was to put "Dead" back into the title although it appeared in small print above the "R" in Relix. Brown, who married Kippel in 1980, took his job as publisher and assumed full responsibility over the future of the magazine.

When the Grateful Dead released In the Dark in 1987, the band's popularity grew exponentially with the help of radio airplay and "Touch of Grey" becoming the group's first song to chart. It played sold-out stadiums. The media became more involved with the Grateful Dead scene as did the police and the government's Drug Enforcement Administration. Deadheads were targeted for drug use and gained something of a negative reputation. Relix recognized the profiling and tried to educate Deadheads about how to avoid the police and what to bring (and not bring) with you to shows.

== Merchandise and record company ==
To keep the magazine profitable, Kippel began dealing an array of collectibles geared towards Relix readers. This prompted him to create a merchandising divisions of the Relix company called Rockin' Relix/ Relix International. This led to many ties in the music merchandise world and Kippel gained connections all over the music scene. Kippel started a record company which he called Relix Records in 1980, after prompting to do so from Grateful Dead lyricist, Robert Hunter. Now, the Relix corporation was flourishing. Relix kept close ties with the record stores that were buying their magazines, merchandise, and now, the albums of the artists it represented. Relix records existed for 20 years and released over 120 records including many magazine favorites, such as Jorma Kaukonen, Hot Tuna, Free Grass Union, the New Riders of the Purple Sage, Wavy Gravy, Commander Cody and many more. Brown also created a forum in the magazine for readers to correspond with incarcerated Deadheads, many who were convicted of non-violent drug offences.

== Phish and Relix ==
In October 1989, Relix covered the band Phish. Mick Skidmore heard an unreleased copy of Junta and decided to write a review. He closed the piece with, "I hope we get a chance to hear more from these extremely talented musicians in the not too distant future. Meanwhile, this tape comes highly recommended." Phish is now one of the most popular bands in the country and frequently appears in the magazine's pages.

== Relix after Jerry Garcia's death ==
Following Jerry Garcia's death on August 9, 1995, Relix was once again the focus of media attention. Relix put a close up picture of Garcia on the cover which was used by media outlets all over the country. Publisher Toni Brown remembers, "Wherever I looked, Relix was there. I admit that it bolstered sales to heights we'd never seen, but I would have preferred to have Jerry back." People looked to Relix for how to cope with the loss of Garcia, the band and its constant tours, tours that were for many provided their livelihood in selling handmade/homemade merchandise and food.

Relix began focusing on a wider of array of bands including Dave Matthews Band, Phish, Widespread Panic, Blues Traveler, Free Grass Union, The String Cheese Incident, moe., The Disco Biscuits, Leftover Salmon, God Street Wine and Strangefolk. In 1998, Relix celebrated its 25th anniversary. Brown, in the editorial for the closing issue of 1998, marveled at Relix's survival and her tenure. She writes, "For many years, I thought that once I completed the last issue of our 25th year, it might be a good time to move on and find myself a new adventure. I never realized the existing adventure would still be fresh and exciting and that the party would go on for so long." She stayed on as editor of the magazine for the next few years, through 2002.

In August 2000, Kippel and Brown decided they were ready for a new direction and sold the magazine to Wall Street executive Steve Bernstein. With that change also came new editor (Aeve Baldwin), art director, marketing and advertising departments. The office was also moved from Brooklyn to Manhattan. The new team prepped readers for a new Relix in the February 2001 issue explaining that the April issue would have an entirely new design and also some content changes. Baldwin originally joined the Relix team when Bernstein persuaded her to take the position when he bought the magazine. She and Bernstein had met in Japan where he had worked for several years and, on the side for fun, was one of her writers at Tokyo Classified, an English-language magazine based in Tokyo where she was the editor). Josh Baron, previously the executive editor who had been with the company since 2001, took over as editor-in-chief in 2007. In 2001, Relix also purchased Jambands.com, a daily news website devoted to improvisational music founded by Dean Budnick in 1998 that helped popularize the term 'jamband'. In 2007, Relix's 190-issue archive entered the vault in the Rock and Roll Hall of Fame and Museum in Cleveland.

Under Bernstein's leadership, Relix served as the basis of Zenbu Media Group, which included productions such as The Jammys, The Green Apple Music and Arts Festival, world music magazine Global Rhythm and heavy metal magazines, Metal Edge and Metal Maniacs. In February 2009, Bernstein folded Zenbu Media due to financial difficulties. The entire staff of all four magazines was let go. As Relix went to print with what was likely its last issue (April/May 2009), a group of the magazine's employees along with Peter Shapiro created Relix Media Group (LLC) to buy Relix and Jambands.com from Bernstein. Shapiro had previously owned jamband-oriented club Wetlands in New York City, and produced concert films such as I Love All Access and U2 3D. The latter having been the first live action digital 3D film brought to big screen movie theaters. Shapiro currently owns Brooklyn Bowl in Williamsburg, a bowling alley, concert venue and restaurant as well as Brooklyn Bowl London, Brooklyn Bowl Las Vegas and the Capitol Theatre in Port Chester, New York.

The group included Baron, the editorial team of Dean Budnick and Mike Greenhaus, advertising team of Rachel Seiden and Cole Boyle along with Shapiro. Relix releases eight issues a year, each with a compilation CD inside featuring artists from that particular issue and up-and-coming bands. Since 2009, Relix Media group has co-founded doNYC, a New York-area event database, with partners DoStuff Media and Bowery Presents, and started the Hear & There advertising network. In 2013, Baron stepped down as Editor, leaving Budnick and Greenhaus to assume the role of Editor-in-Chief. Relix spent much of 2013 counting down to its 40th anniversary. As part of the magazine's anniversary campaign, artists core to the magazine's history—including The Who, Dave Matthews Band, Warren Haynes, Phil Lesh, Widespread Panic, Jack Johnson and Kings of Leon—received cover profiles. The magazine also launched the Relix 40 list, compiling the best books, live albums, guitar solos and jams since Relix's first issue.

Recent cover artists include Jon Batiste, Grace Potter, Tame Impala, Robert Hunter, Gary Clark Jr., a tribute to the Grateful Dead's 50th anniversary, My Morning Jacket, Punch Brothers, Robert Plant and Phish. In June 2020, with most concerts cancelled due to the COVID-19 pandemic, Relix published a special Power of Live issue.
