= Tom Osander =

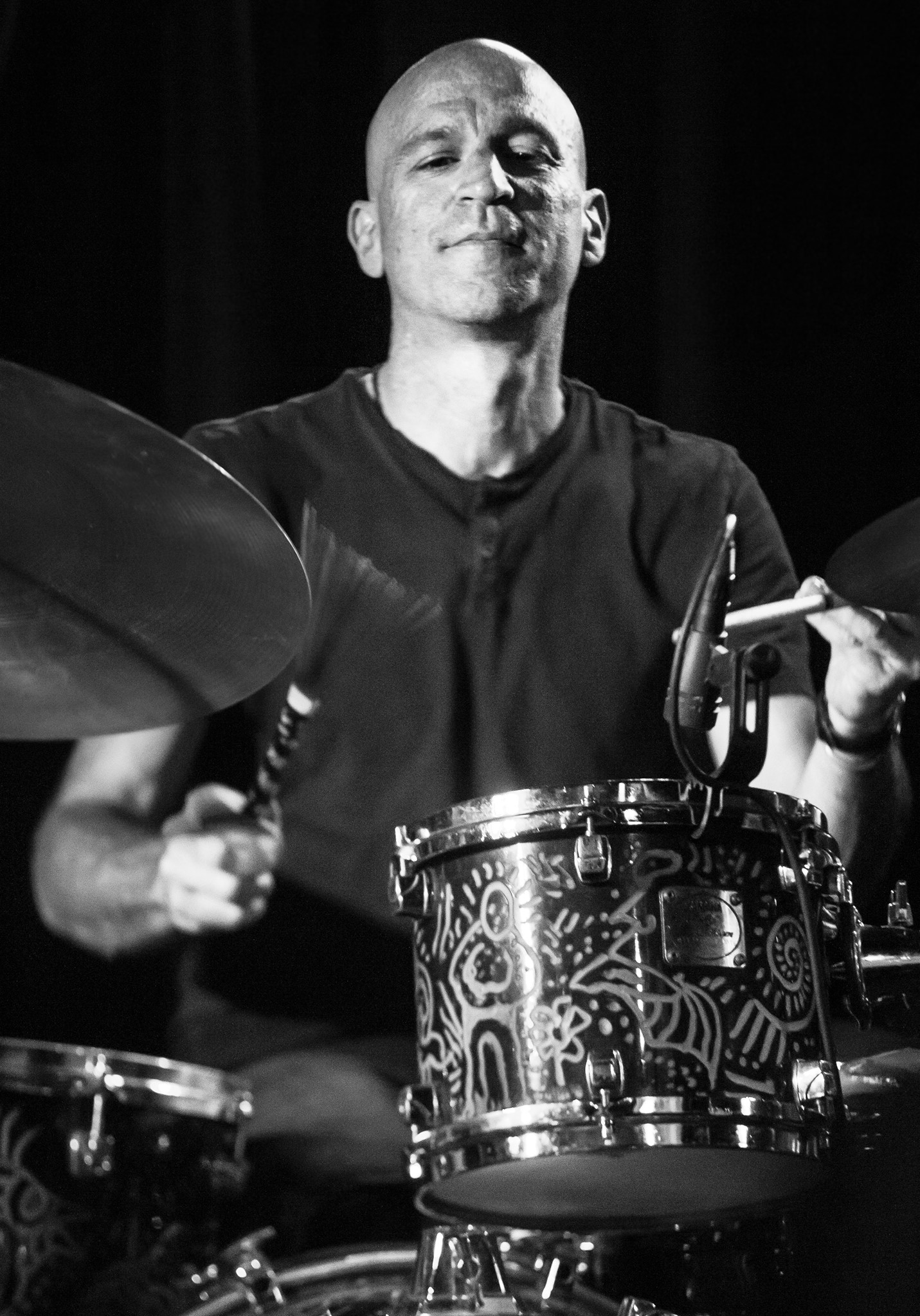
- Osander performing in Dublin, Ireland

Background information
- Born: 6 October 1966 (age 59)
- Origin: Princeton, New Jersey, United States
- Genres: Rock, folk, indie rock, folk rock
- Occupations: Musician, record producer
- Instruments: Drums, percussion, guitar, vocals
- Years active: 1985–present
- Labels: Geffen, Mercury, Heffa, Warner Bros., DRM/14th Floor
- Member of: God Street Wine
- Website: www.tomosander.com

Tom Osander aka Tomo (born John Thomas Osander Jr. on 6 October 1966) is an American drummer, percussionist and producer. Osander co-founded seminal New York City based jam band God Street Wine. He is also associated with Damien Rice, Lisa Hannigan, and Hanna Leess.

Born in Princeton, New Jersey Osander was a member of the New York City jam band God Street Wine from 1988 to 1998, recording six albums and performing more than 1,000 shows, touring with bands such as The Allman Brothers, Bruce Hornsby and the Black Crowes.

In 1999 Osander moved to Killarney, Ireland, to briefly join the alternative, Killarney-based rock band Poor Uncle Harry.
He began working with Damien Rice in 2000 and over the next several years recorded both the albums "O" and "9". During his time with Rice he recorded the Billie Holiday song Don't Explain with Herbie Hancock for his 2005 Possibilities album
In the summer of 2007 he left Rice to concentrate on Lisa Hannigan's solo career, recording her first album Sea Sew in 2008 and touring with her until 2010. The album was nominated for the Mercury Music Prize in 2009.

In 2010 Osander relocated to Berlin, Germany and recorded and/or toured with various artists including Gemma Hayes, Erik Penny, Ultan Conlon, Peter Doran and American singer Hanna Leess, with whom he co-produced her 2016 album Dirty Mouth Sweet Heart on PIAS/CNTCT Recordings.

Also in 2010 God Street Wine reformed to play several reunion shows. The band would continue to perform sporadically up to present day. These reunion shows included several dates as the "Friends" in Grateful Dead bassist Phil Lesh and Friends in January 2013.

Osander, with his partner Tanja Raab, have produced several benefit shows over the years under the name Double Donkey Productions. These include the 2004 Concert for Bam (in aid of the victims of the Stephens Day earthquake in Iran) at Vicar Street in Dublin and the 2010 Thomastown Community Kindergarten Benefit featuring Paul Noonan and Gavin Glass at the Bridgebrook Arms in Kilkenny, Ireland.

== Selected Discography ==
With Damien Rice

- O (2002)
- 9 (2006)

With Lisa Hannigan

- Sea Sew (2008)

With God Street Wine

- Bag (1992)
- Who's Driving? (1993)
- $1.99 Romances (1994)
- Red (1995)
- God Street Wine (1997)
- Good to the Last Drop - Live (2000)
- 25th Anniversary Boxed Set (2013)
- This Fine Town (2019)

With Herbie Hancock

- Possibilities (2005)

With Lotta St Joan

- Song for the Undecided (2024)

With Scott & Lila

- Scott & Lila (2024)

With Lo Faber

- Bottomland (2019)

With Hanna Leess

- Dirty Mouth Sweet Heart (2016)

With Sonny Casey

- Phoebe (2021)

With Eilon Freeman

- Bare Naked in the Cold (2023)

With Port Noo

- In The Middle Of Everything (2017)

With Peter Doran

- Outlines (2014)

With Crossmoke

- Rock Is Dead (2020)

With Kieran McMahon

- Soul Bird (2015)

With Margaret Healy

- Girls, Boys and Clockwork Toys (2009)

== See also ==
- Lisa Hannigan
- Damien Rice
- God Street Wine
