= Green Apple Music & Arts Festival =

The Green Apple Festival was a music and arts festival, advertised as America's largest Earth Day Celebration.

Green Apple Festival was founded by Peter Shapiro and Zenbu Media. It is produced in partnership with Earth Day Network (EDN), a non-profit organization created by the original founders of Earth Day in 1970.

== 2008 ==
It has been inactive since 2009. Green Apple Festival took place in New York City, Washington DC, Miami, Chicago, Denver, Dallas, Los Angeles and San Francisco.

On April 20, 2008, eight simultaneous events were held to observe Earth Day, with over 200,000 people attending in landmark venues: Central Park in New York, the National Mall in Washington DC, Bicentennial Park in Miami, Fair Park in Dallas, Lincoln Park Zoo in Chicago, City Park in Denver, Golden Gate Park in San Francisco, and Santa Monica Pier in Los Angeles.

In addition, Green Apple Festival also presented 220 music shows in indoor music venues in the eight cities on April 18 and 19. Each of the 110 venues where the shows took place and 475 performances themselves were made "green" through the use of environmentally sustainable paper, lighting and cleaning products.

== Past Events ==
=== 2007 ===
In 2007, The Green Apple Music & Arts Festival ran from April 20–22 in New York City, Chicago and San Francisco with over 200,000 in attendance and millions more reached through the media. Large-scale free public events were held in Central Park and on Vanderbilt Avenue outside Grand Central Terminal in New York, the Lincoln Park Zoo in Chicago and at Golden Gate Park in San Francisco. Green Apple partnered with Earth Day Network, the worldwide coordinating body for Earth Day events, campaigns and activities.

=== 2006 ===
The first annual Green Apple Music & Arts festival was held at over 35 venues in the New York City area and ran from April 20–23. On Thursday, April 20, The Sixth Annual Jammy Awards show (Jammys)at Madison Square Garden kicked off the festivities. Jammys performances included: Blues Traveler, Guster, Peter Frampton, Martin Sexton, Béla Fleck and The Flecktones, and many more. The festival concluded at The Ziegfeld Theatre with the world premiere of the film Wetlands Preserved directed by Relix senior editor and Jambands.com founder Dean Budnick and executive produced by Peter Shapiro. The documentary examines the social, political and musical history of the celebrated New York City rock club The Wetlands.
