= Casely (company) =

American tech accessory company

- Founded: 2017
- Headquarters: New York City, New York, United States

Casely is an American phone case and tech accessories company headquartered in Brooklyn, New York, founded in 2017. Casely's power banks have been involved in a number of explosion incidents including one fatality.

== History ==
Casely was co-founded in 2017 by Mark Stallings and Emily Stallings. Mark, who had sold his first e-commerce business, a tech accessories venture on eBay and Amazon, proposed launching a fashionable phone case subscription service. Emily joined him after a career in healthcare marketing.

In 2020, Casely partnered with the Grateful Dead on a limited-edition line of licensed iPhone cases. Some of the proceeds were donated to Feeding America and HeadCount. The effort was part of Casely's charitable initiative, which allocates 5% of monthly net proceeds to various charitable organizations.

In 2021 and 2024, Casely partnered with the Van Gogh Museum to release collections featuring artwork by Vincent van Gogh and Pierre Bonnard.

== Power bank explosion incidents ==
In April 2025, Casely recalled over 400,000 Power Pod wireless chargers after reports of overheating and fire hazards linked to their lithium-ion batteries. About a year later, the recall was reissued for 429,000 power banks following the death of a woman who died of complications from injuries she sustained when a Casely powerbank exploded in her lap. In February 2026, Casely's power bank was involved in another incident where it exploded on board a plane while being used. Since the original recall in April 2025, there has been 28 additional reports to the United States Consumer Product Safety Commission regarding their power banks.
