= 2020 census =

2020 census may refer to:

- 2020 Alberta municipal censuses
- 2020 Chinese census
- 2020 Indonesian census
- 2020 Mexican census
- 2020 Philippine census
- 2020 Turkish census
- 2020 United States census

== See also ==
- Census
- Census bureau
- Head count (disambiguation)
- Per capita
