= Bag (album) =

Studio album by God Street Wine
- Released: 1992
- Recorded: 1992
- Genre: Rock
- Length: 71:18
- Label: Ripe & Ready
- Producer: God Street Wine, Amy Tucci

God Street Wine chronology
| Bag (1992) | Who's Driving (1993) |

Professional ratings
Review scores
| Source | Rating |
|---|---|
| Allmusic | 2.5/5 stars |

Bag is the first album by God Street Wine. It was released independently by Ripe & Ready records in 1992, containing many of the songs that would become staples of the band's concerts.

== Track listing ==
All tracks by Lo Faber except where noted

1. "Nightingale" – 5:48
2. "Goodnight Gretchen" – 6:46
3. "Feel the Pressure" (Pifer) – 5:54
4. "Waiting for the Tide" – 6:25
5. "Fortress of Solitude" – 7:14
6. "Upside Down + Inside Out" – 4:46
7. "Borderline" – 5:02
8. "Better Than You" – 4:49
9. "Hellfire" – 5:22
10. "One Armed Man" (God Street Wine) – 7:07
11. "Home Again" – 4:27
12. "Epilog" – 7:29

== Personnel ==
- Jon Bevo – keyboards
- Lo Faber – guitar, piano, vocals
- Aaron Maxwell – guitar, vocals, slide guitar
- Dan Pifer – bass guitar, vocals
- Tomo – percussion, drums, vocals

== Production ==
- Marie Feliu - photography
- Rick Mathis-Rowe – mastering, mastering engineer
- Joe Rogers – engineer, technical consultant, production consultant
- Rob Sinclair - artwork
- Amy Tucci - executive producer
- God Street Wine - producer, executive producer
- Michael Weiss - organizer
