= Capitol Theatre (Port Chester, New York) =

Historic theatre in New York, US

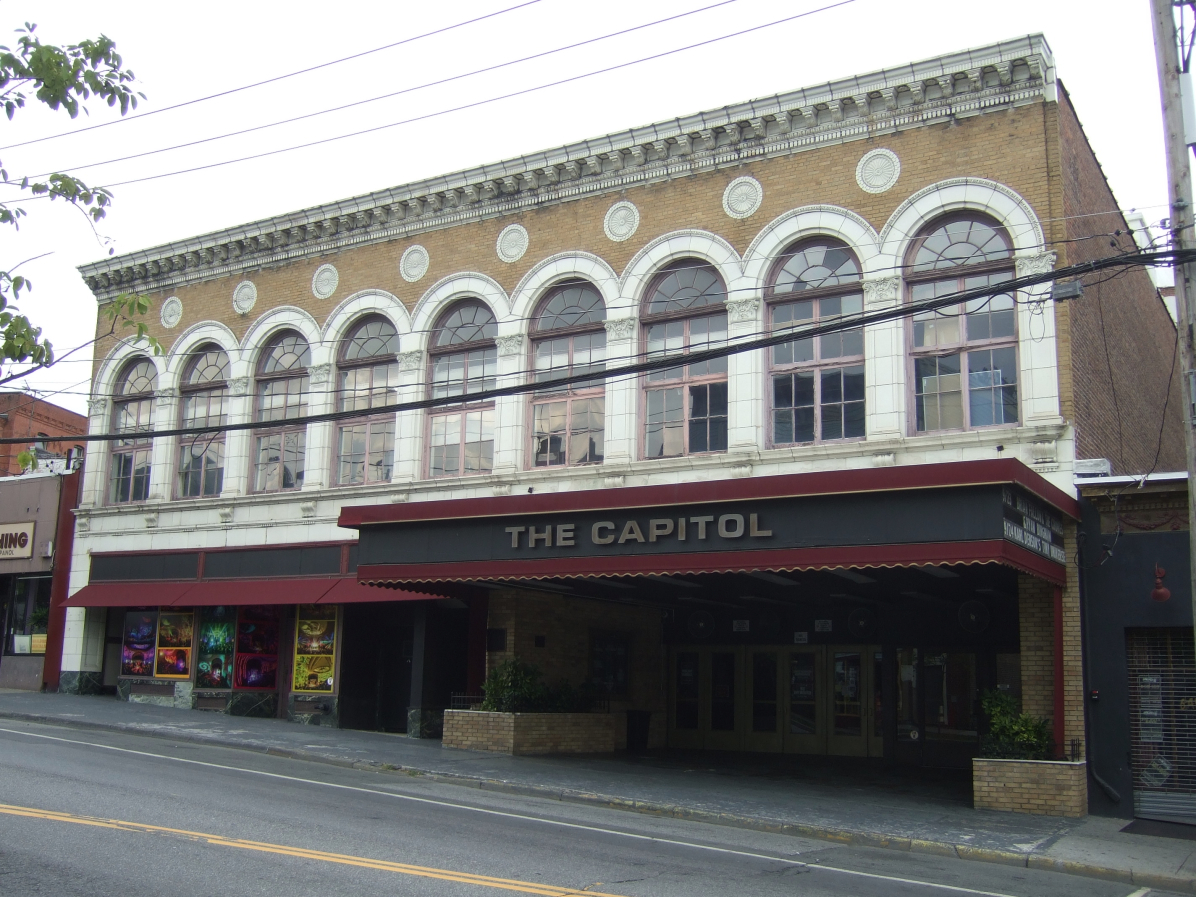
- 2016
- Interactive map of Capitol Theatre
- Address: 149 Westchester Avenue
- Location: Port Chester, New York
- Owner: Peter Shapiro
- Capacity: 1,800
- Type: movie palace

Construction
- Opened: 1926 (100 years ago)

Website
- www.thecapitoltheatre.com
- Capitol Theatre
- U.S. National Register of Historic Places
- Location within New York Location within the United States
- Location: 147-151 Westchester Ave., Port Chester, New York
- Coordinates: 41°0′6″N 73°39′56″W
- Area: less than one acre
- Architect: Thomas W. Lamb
- NRHP reference No.: 84003426
- Added to NRHP: June 7, 1984

The Capitol Theatre is a historic theater located in the village of Port Chester, Westchester County, New York. It was designed by noted theater architect Thomas W. Lamb (1871–1942) and built in 1926. The 1,800-seat facility operates as a concert venue, hosting musicians and occasionally comedians, and is owned and operated by New York City-based concert promoter Peter Shapiro. The Capitol Theatre has a long history, with tenures as a movie theater and catering hall, in addition to hosting concerts.

== Building structure ==
The theater consists of a three-story section containing three storefronts, the theater entrance and two stories of office space in addition to the theater auditorium. The front section is nine bays wide and four bays deep with a truncated hipped roof. It features a decorative terracotta cornice. The theater structure is irregular in shape and ranges from four to seven stories in height.

== History ==
=== Movie theater ===
The Capitol Theatre was built for vaudeville and cinema and continued as a movie theater until 1970. Its opening night in 1926 sold out all 2,000 seats and had to turn hundreds away.

=== Concert venue ===
In the 1970s, the theater was renovated for use as a performance space. The Capitol was utilized as a concert space throughout the 1970s, 1980s and 1990s, and featured performances by such acts as Pink Floyd, Johnny Winter, Rick Derringer, Talking Heads, the Grateful Dead, New Riders of the Purple Sage, Rubén Blades, Janis Joplin, and Traffic. The Grateful Dead played 13 dates at the Capitol Theatre in a one-year span from 1970 to 1971. American Songwriter notes that "Many fans think those shows were some of the best the band ever played." Janis Joplin debuted her song "Mercedes Benz" at the theater, to the surprise of her band, after writing it at a bar nearby.

In 1984, the Capitol Theatre was added to the National Register of Historic Places. In the 1980s, the frequency of live events at the theater diminished, partially because of a village curfew for live music after 1:00 a.m. The Capitol would host off-Broadway plays and musicals, and events run by the Port Chester arts council. The 1990s would see some live music again, with the likes of Phish, Blues Traveler, God Street Wine, Spin Doctors, the Church and Strangefolk. Both David Bowie and the Rolling Stones performed at the Capitol in 1997 as part of episodes of the MTV television program Live From The 10 Spot. The venue also hosted the Complete Last Waltz around Thanksgiving for several years.

=== Catering hall ===
The theater later became a catering and special-events facility, run by owner Marvin Ravikoff and managed under the leadership of James Lopolito from October 2001 to December 2011. The lower-level seats were removed to create a flat space to accommodate 600 people seated at tables and a dance floor for weddings, mitzvahs and other events. Under Lopolito's leadership, the theater became one of Westchester County's leading event venues.

=== Reopening as concert venue ===
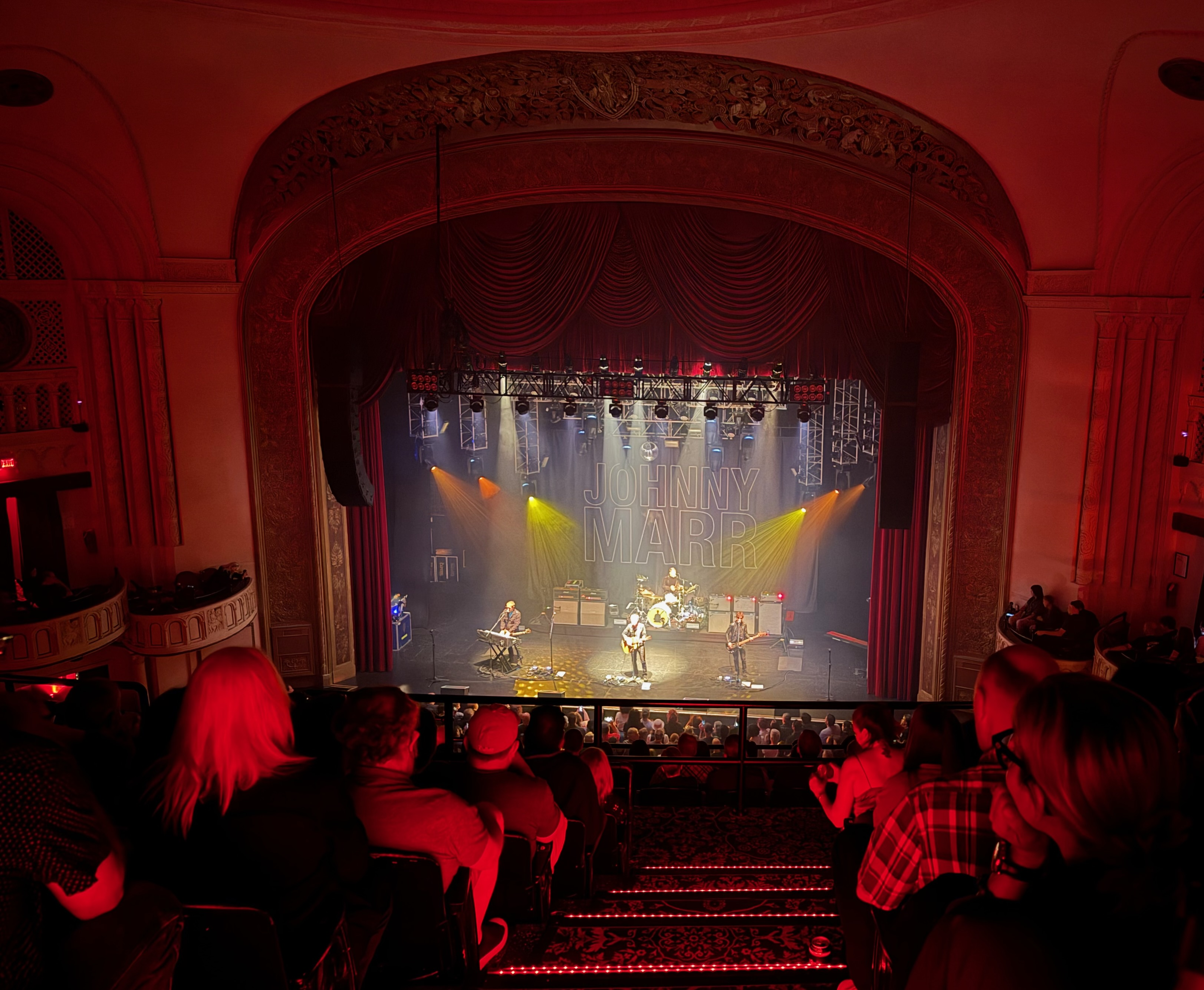
Johnny Marr at the Capitol Theatre in 2025

In December 2011, The New York Times announced that the theater was to be reopened by music entrepreneur Peter Shapiro, owner of the Brooklyn Bowl and former owner of the New York City club Wetlands Preserve, to present major concerts at the venue in partnership with concert promoter The Bowery Presents. A multimillion-dollar renovation took place and new sound and lighting equipment was installed. Part of the renovations included acquiring the adjacent Capitol Jewelers store and converting it into a bar, which is open to the public most nights when the theater does not have an event. The bar, with the approval of the estate of the Garcia family, was named "Garcia's" in honor of Grateful Dead guitarist Jerry Garcia. The Capitol Theatre reopened on September 4, 2012, with Bob Dylan as its first act. Initially, Shapiro had a long-term lease on the theater, which, at the time, was owned by Marvin Ravikoff. In December 2012, Shapiro purchased the theater.

In 2013, the venue hosted Dawes, Blondie, Pat Benatar, Billy Idol, the Rascals, and Chicago, and scheduled Neil Young, Willie Nelson, Chris Isaak, Yes, Foreigner, Patti Smith, Courtney Love, Bonnie Raitt, Jonny Lang, Cyndi Lauper, Herbie Hancock and many other performers.

On November 3, 2013, The New York Times reported that Phil Lesh, longtime bass player of the Grateful Dead, would play 45 shows with Shapiro, of which 30 would take place at the Capitol Theatre and the first at Brooklyn Bowl on November 14, 2013. Since Lesh's retirement from touring in 2014, he has performed multiple residencies each year at the Capitol Theatre in addition to performing other shows at his own venue, Terrapin Crossroads in San Rafael, California, and occasionally at other venues, often ones owned by Shapiro.

On December 11, 2015, Bo Burnham's standup special Make Happy was filmed at the Capitol Theatre and released on Netflix the following year.

== See also ==
- National Register of Historic Places listings in southern Westchester County, New York
