= Zenbu Media =

American media company

Zenbu Media is a media company located in New York City. It was founded by Steve Bernstein and it is focused on music production, record production and music branding. Its slogan is "We live for music".

== Print ==
Zenbu Media formerly published Relix magazine, Global Rhythm magazine, Metal Edge magazine, and Metal Maniacs magazine.

=== Relix Magazine ===
Relix Magazine was founded in 1974 by Les Kippel as a newsletter focusing on The Grateful Dead. Originally, the publication was called Dead Relix and was less than twenty pages thick with a hand-drawn black and white cover. By 1978, Dead Relix had dropped the word "Dead" from its title and expanded to include articles about the entire Bay Area psychedelic scene. From here, Relix expanded to encompass musical genres such as reggae and heavy metal.

After the death of Jerry Garcia in 1995, Relix began to report on jam bands and other genres of music not considered as mainstream. In 2000, the magazine was purchased by Steve Bernstein and in 2007, it entered the Rock and Roll Hall of Fame. Today, Relix covers jam bands, indie rockers, singer-songwriters, and the live music scene in general. Each issue comes with a free CD sampling various up and coming bands. Bernstein sold Relix to Relix Media Group in 2009.

=== Metal Edge ===
Metal Edge was the longest-running metal magazine in America. It was first published by Sterling Publishing in 1985 and was closed in 2009 after being purchased by Zenbu Media in February 2007. Its founding editor was Gerri Miller, and Paul Gargano assumed the role in 2022 when the magazine nameplate was resurrected as a website.

=== Metal Maniacs ===
Metal Maniacs covered heavy metal music and was founded in 1989 by Mike Greenhaus and Kathrine Ludwig. The magazine covered the underground metal scene with an emphasis on the black and death metal genres. It was published by Sterling until Zenbu Media purchased it. Metal Maniacs was published ten times annually and was closed in 2009.

== Events ==
Zenbu Media is in charge of two major events: The Jammys and the Green Apple Music & Arts Festival.

=== The Jammy Awards ===
The Jammys is an award show geared towards jam bands but also includes other live improvisational genres of music.

=== Green Apple Music Festival ===
The Green Apple Music & Arts Festival (GAMAF) is an Earth Day celebration. Founded by music producer and former Wetlands Preserve club owner Peter Shapiro and Relix Magazine, the annual event features musical performances in venues and rock clubs, as well as large-scale free public outdoor concerts. The festival combines live musical performances from various genres with educational outreach and cultural events, and is held around Earth Day, April 22.

== Relix Records ==
Relix Records was a boutique record label. Some of its artists include Jonah Smith, the John Popper Project featuring DJ Logic and Phil Lesh & Friends.

Additionally, Relix Classics, an imprint of Relix Records, digitally release the works of artists including Jorma Kaukonen, Hot Tuna, Flying Burrito Brothers and the New Riders of the Purple Sage.

As the owner of these recordings, Zenbu filed lawsuits in January 2015 against streaming and music companies such as Apple's Beats, Sony, Google, Rdio, Songza, and Slacker for streaming pre-1972 recordings without having licensed them. All of the lawsuits were quickly dismissed, except for the lawsuit against Sony.
