= $1.99 Romances =

Studio album by God Street Wine
- Released: September 27, 1994
- Recorded: 1994
- Genre: Rock
- Length: 72:23
- Label: Geffen
- Producer: Jim Dickinson

God Street Wine chronology
Who's Driving (1993)	$1.99 Romances (1994)	Red (1996)

$1.99 Romances is an album by God Street Wine. It was their first release on a major record label and their only release with Geffen.

Disappointed about the promotion of this record, GSW negotiated to be dropped from the label after the album came out. They then recorded their next album, Red, on their own, before being signed to Mercury Records.

== Critical reception ==
Professional ratings
Review scores
Source	Rating
AllMusic	4.5/5 stars
MusicHound Rock: The Essential Album Guide	2/5 stars

UPI called the album "strong", writing that producer Jim Dickinson "worked his magic". The Washington Post wrote that $1.99 Romances "separates the group from the jam-band pack by using Steely Dan as its main model rather than the usual choices of the Grateful Dead or the Allman Brothers." Trouser Press wrote that the band "is like a top-drawer wedding band taking the liberty of showcasing some songs of its own devising while the chopped liver is being served".

Billboard praised Dickson's production work, writing that the album "captures the group's Steely Dan-like musical cool and sophistication." Steve Blush, in New York Rock: From the Rise of the Velvet Underground to the Fall of CBGB, called it "a dollar-bin classic".

== Track listing ==
All tracks are written by Lo Faber, except where noted.

No.	Title	Length
1.	"Princess Henrietta"	6:50
2.	"Mile by Mile" (Faber, Aaron Maxwell)	3:40
3.	"Nightingale"	4:41
4.	"Thirsty"	4:03
5.	"Stone House"	3:55
6.	"Molly"	4:45
7.	"The Ballroom"	5:24
8.	"Run to You"	4:21
9.	"Crazy Head"	4:01
10.	"Hammer and a Spike"	4:43
11.	"Wendy"	4:47
12.	"Imogene"	5:33
13.	"Tina's Town"	4:38
14.	"Into the Sea"	6:24

== Personnel ==
- Jon Bevo – Organ, Piano, Vocals
- Lo Faber – Guitar, Vocals, Mixing
- Aaron Maxwell – Guitar, Vocals
- Dan Pifer – Bass, Guitar (Bass), Vocals
- Tomo – Drums, Vocals, Trap Kit

Production

- Chris Curran – Engineer, Mixing Assistant
- Jim Dickinson – Producer
- Nick DiDia – Mixing
- Sanchez Harley – Vocal Coach
- Bob Krusen – Engineer
- Michael Lavine – Photography
- George Marino – Mastering
- Kevin Reagan – Art Direction, Design
- Joe Rogers – Engineer
- Malcolm Springer – Engineer
