= Lo Faber =

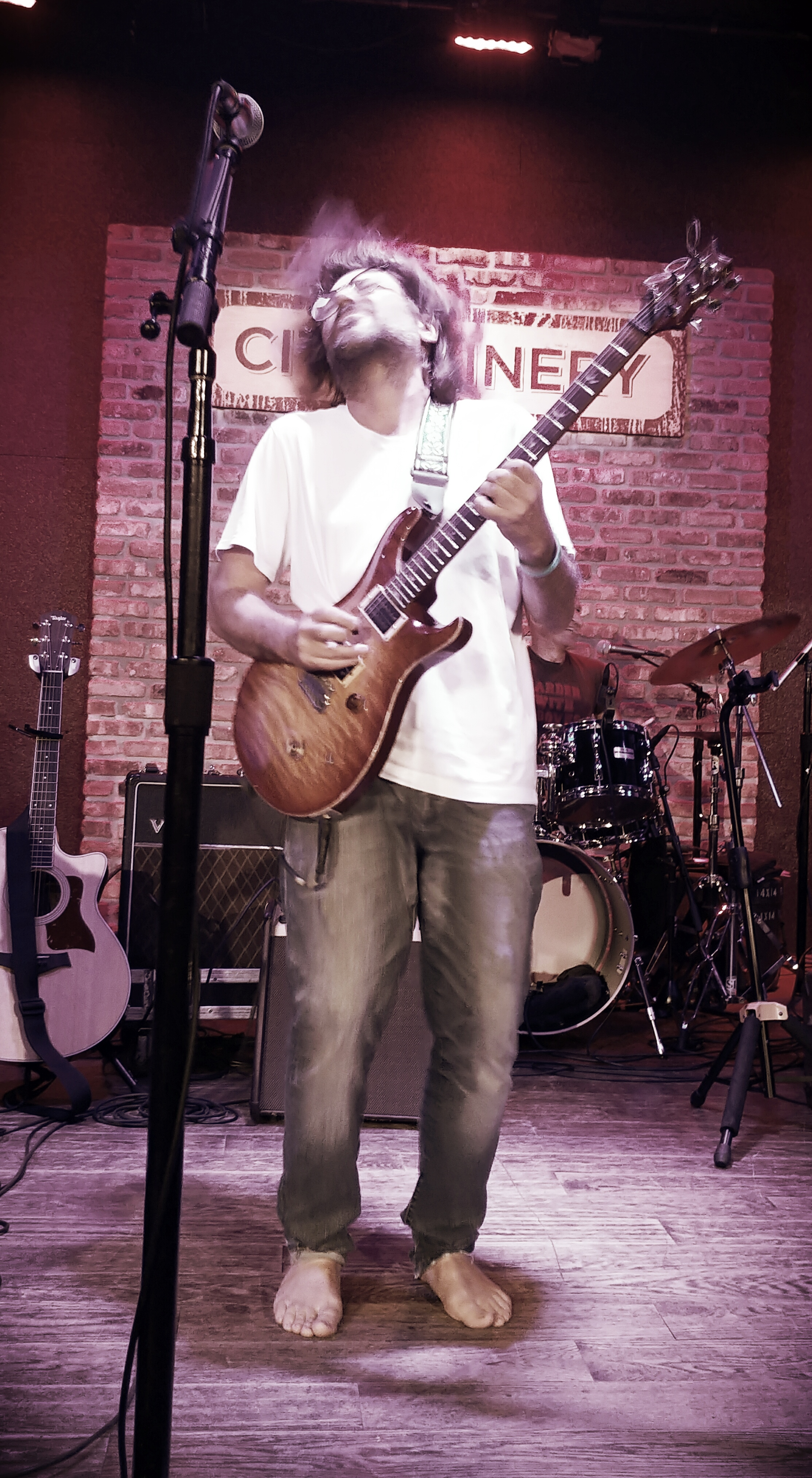
- Lo Faber onstage 2018

Background information
- Also known as: Dr. Lo
- Born: May 20, 1966 (age 59)
- Origin: Wilkes Barre, PA, United States
- Genres: Rock, jazz, psychedelia, pop, rock opera, singer-songwriter
- Occupations: Musician, producer, college professor
- Instruments: Guitar, vocals, piano, lap steel
- Years active: 1985–present
- Labels: Geffen, Mercury, Six Feet of Snow
- Website: https://lofabermusic.com/home

Lo Faber (born May 20, 1966, in Wilkes Barre, Pennsylvania) is a musician and a college professor. He co-founded the influential New York City jam band God Street Wine. Though each member of the band has composed some of their songs, Faber is the primary songwriter and band leader. He and Aaron Maxwell share lead vocal and lead guitar duties.

His mother Ellen Faber played in a bluegrass band when he was young and he recalls that his mother's band "rehearsed directly under my bedroom and I remember many night when I couldn't sleep all night for listening to them practicing their harmonies and learning new tunes." He grew up in rural Belle Mead, New Jersey and in high school began by playing the bass and later the guitar in several bands around Princeton, New Jersey with future God Street Wine drummer Tom Osander. One band, Aid to the Choking Victim, briefly included Blues Traveler bass player Bobby Sheehan.

For a time in the mid 80's after graduating high school he worked for the family business, the Eberhard Faber GmbH pencil company, but was "pretty miserable wearing a suit and selling pencils" and by 1986 he'd enrolled at the Manhattan School of Music to study jazz with future God Street Wine bassist Dan Pifer. By 1991 the band had built a large following playing clubs in New York City such as The Wetlands Preserve and Nightingales bar, and in 1992 began what would become several years of touring and recording.

God Street Wine broke up in 1999 and Faber has since developed solo projects which include the rock musicals Henry's House (2001) and Friday Night Freakshow (2003). Soon after writing Henry's House he toured for a year with members of the Ominous Seapods as the Lo Faber Band playing material from Henry's House and God Street Wine. On July 9 and 10, 2010 God Street Wine reunited its original lineup for two shows at New York's Gramercy Theatre. The concerts were a benefit for the National Multiple Sclerosis Society. Faber pursued a PhD in early 19th-century American History at Princeton University. After earning his doctorate in 2012, he became a visiting assistant professor of history at Loyola University New Orleans. From Spring 2015 until his departure at the end of the 2019 school year. Faber was the main professor of Loyola's Music Industry Department for the Intro to Music Industry courses.

== 2015: "Building the Land of Dreams" ==
In 2015 Faber published "Building the Land of Dreams New Orleans and the Transformation of Early America" through Princeton University Press. It was the Winner of the 2015 Kemper and Leila Williams Prize in Louisiana History, Historic New Orleans Collection and the Louisiana Historical Association.

== 2019 ==
In April 2019 Relix Magazine published an interview with Faber about the history of New Orleans relative to Jazz Fest.
In the Spring of 2019, Faber announced his intention to return to making music full time after some years as a History Professor.
On November 22, 2019, Faber released Bottomland under the pseudonym Doctor Lo.

== 2020 ==
Faber was a couple of months into a support tour for "Bottomland" when his touring activities were halted due to the outbreak of the Covid-19 Pandemic. He soon pivoted to twice weekly live streams via his Facebook and YouTube pages.

== 2021 ==
On June 18, 2021 Faber released "Claiborne Avenue." He supported the release by touring with a newly formed band, dubbed "Le Band."

== Discography ==
Solo Albums
As "Lo Faber"

Release date	Title
2001	Henry's House
2003	Friday Night Freakshow

As "Doctor Lo"

Release date	Title
2019	Bottomland
2021	Claiborne Avenue

As "Doctor Lo Trio"

Release date	Title
2021	Early For A Saturday Night

As a Producer

Release date	Artist	Title
1996	Ominous Seapods	Jet Smooth Ride
2000	Jason Crosby	Out of The Box
2001	Kika	Kika

with God Street Wine

Release date	Title
1990	Live at The 712 Club +
1992	Bag
1993	Who's Driving?
1994	$1.99 Romances
1995/6	Red
1997	God Street Wine
2000	Good to the Last Drop
2013	25th Anniversary Boxed Set
2019	This Fine Town
Unreleased	Hot, Sweet & Juicy

+ Cassette Only

Singles

Release date	Title
2016	Oh Wonderful One
2017	Firelight Flickers
2017	St. Lucy's Day
2017	After The Show
2017	Stories of Silver
2017	Souvenir
2017	Let Me Know You
2017	Five Tunnels
2018	Smile on Us Sarah
2018	On The Shores of Silver Lake
