= HeadCount =

American non-partisan non-profit organization

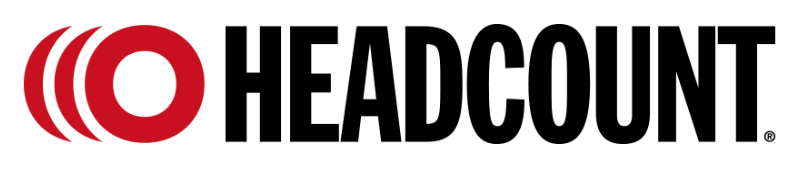
- Founded: 2004; 22 years ago
- Founders: Andy Bernstein, Marc Brownstein
- Purpose: Music and politics civic engagement voter registration voter turnout
- Headquarters: New York, U.S.
- Region served: United States
- Executive Director: Lucille Wenegieme
- Website: Official website

HeadCount is an American nonpartisan nonprofit organization that works with musicians to promote participation in democracy in the United States. It is one of the largest voter registration organizations, having registered over 1.7 million voters since launching in 2004. HeadCount started off registering voters at concerts before expanding to sporting events, community events and online.

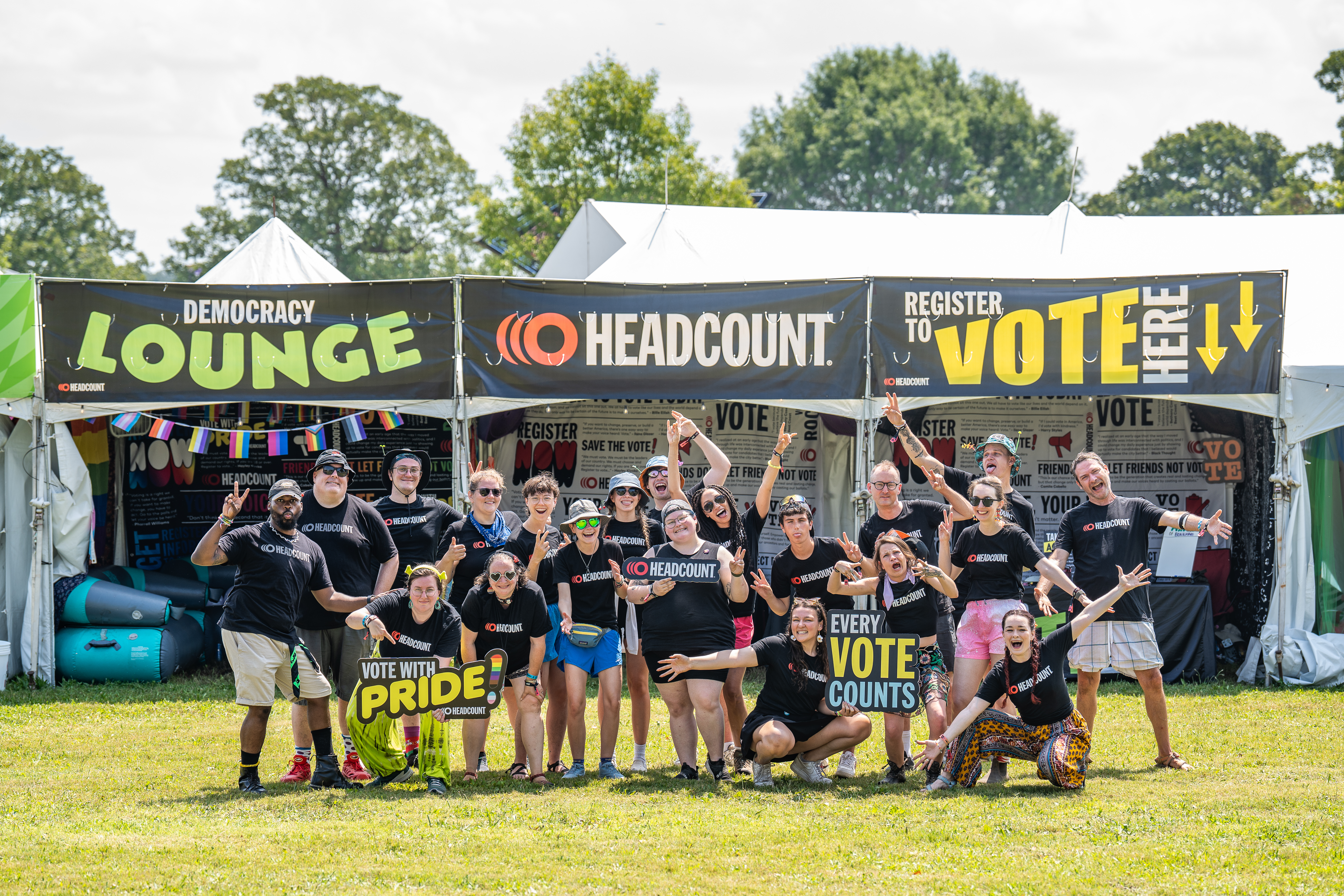

== Origins ==
The organization was co-founded in 2004 by Marc Brownstein, bass player for the popular electronic rock band The Disco Biscuits, and his friend Andy Bernstein, author of The Pharmer's Almanac, a series of books about Phish.

Since its inception, HeadCount has been largely volunteer-driven. It fields volunteer teams in most major U.S. cities. Each consists of a trained team leader who runs the local operations, and a cadre of volunteers. These teams then set up tables at concerts through which they register voters and disseminate information related to political issues and upcoming elections. This approach has allowed HeadCount to keep its operating costs low while reaching a very large number of people. In any given year, the organization sets up these tables at 500 to 1,500 concerts or more. Approximately 100,000 volunteers are active with HeadCount across the country.

As of 2014, it was also receiving support from more than 300 artists and celebrities tweeting out messages like #GoVote, some with the HeadCount logo.

In 2019, the Board of Directors included Grateful Dead guitarist Bob Weir, Marc Brownstein and Peter Shapiro as the new chairman of the board. Founder Andy Bernstein stepped down as executive director of the organization in 2023. Lucille Wenegieme currently serves as the Executive Director of the organization.

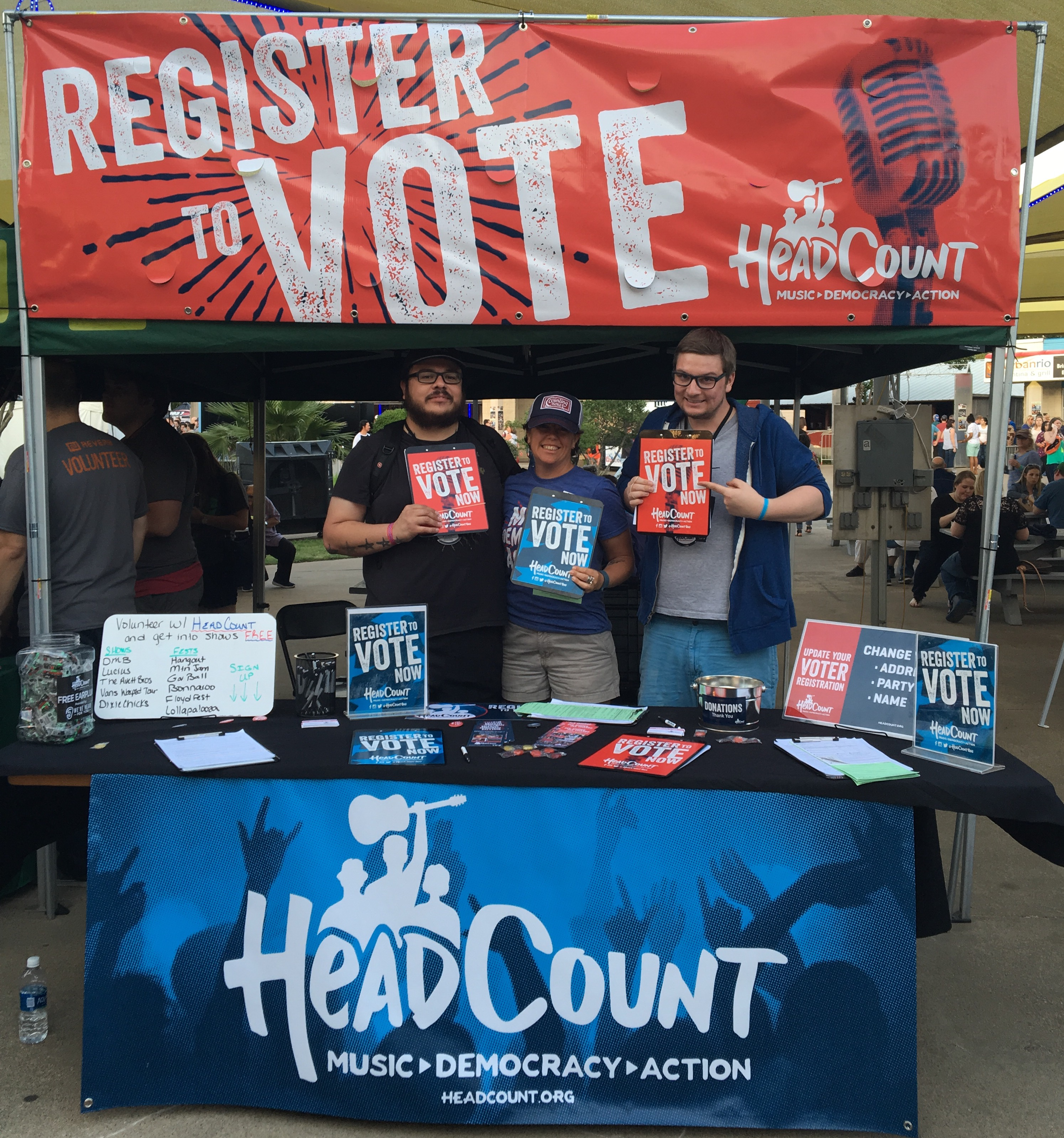
HeadCount booth at Dave Matthews conference

== Activities ==
Some of HeadCount's higher-profile activity includes the release of public service announcements starring Jay-Z and Dave Matthews, a compilation album featuring Pearl Jam, Wilco and Phish, and various activities involving board member Bob Weir of the Grateful Dead.

=== 2024 elections ===
I Am a Voter merged with HeadCount in 2024. I Am a Voter started in 2018, and their first partnership after the merger was 'Register a Friend Day' on June 4.

The Daily Show partnered with HeadCount to register voters while also promoting dog adoption.

Sabrina Carpenter partnered with HeadCount to register more voters than any other artist ahead of the 2024 election, registering 35,814 voters and encouraging an additional 263,087 individuals to check their registration status and polling locations.

=== 2022 midterms ===
Harry Styles partnered with HeadCount to help register 54,000 voters ahead of the 2022 midterms. Overall, HeadCount registered over 150,000 voters helped also by partnerships with Billie Eilish, Tinashe, Lizzo and others.

=== 2020 elections ===
For the 2020 election, the organization registered roughly 400,000 voters, through its work with Ariana Grande, Spotify, YouTuber David Dobrik, and hundreds of other musicians, brands and partners. Although HeadCount is largely known for its on-the-ground work registering voters at concerts, and is a mainstay at festivals like Bonnaroo and Lollapalooza, the Coronavirus pandemic did not stop the organization's momentum. It partnered with entertainers who offered unique experiences which were raffled off for those who checked their registration. It also partnered with American Eagle Outfitters to release t-shirts that promoted voting.

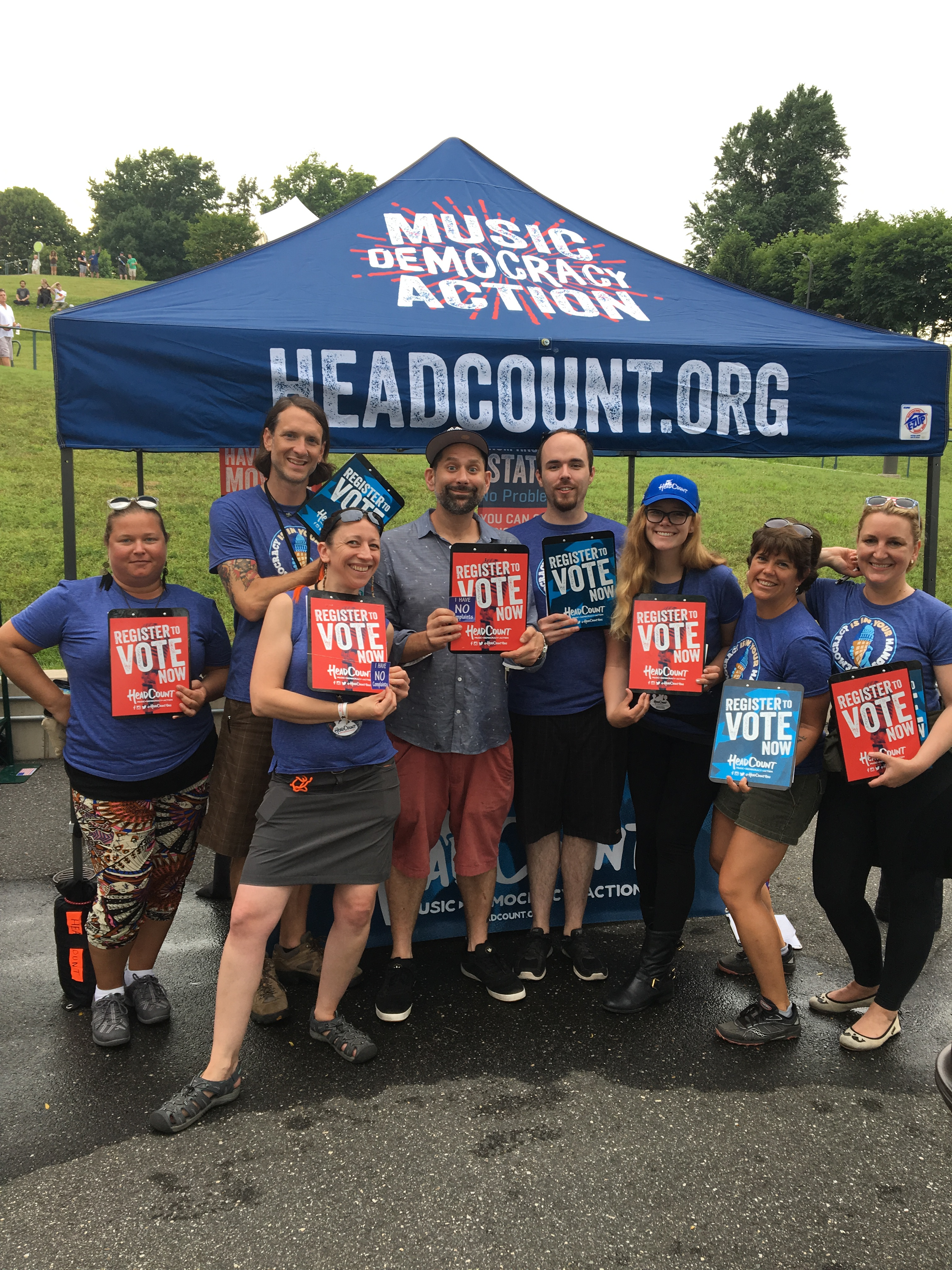
HeadCount tent at Phish concert

=== 2018 midterms ===
For the midterm elections in 2018, HeadCount also rolled out a campaign called "The Future is Voting" featuring a get-out-the-vote tour in college towns. Earlier that year, HeadCount ran the voter registration efforts for March for Our Lives, the organization created by students from Parkland, FL after the mass shooting at their high school. They also teamed-up with Penguin Random House to promote voter registration in bookstores.

=== National Voter Registration Day ===
HeadCount is a founder of National Voter Registration Day and stages a massive social media campaign around it each year. The campaign has featured hundreds of musicians and entertainers posting "Register to Vote" photos on Facebook, Twitter and Instagram, with a link to an online voter registration form. Participants included Stephen Colbert, Jon Stewart, Fergie, Russell Simmons and The Black Keys.

=== Public Service Announcements ===
In 2016 HeadCount partnered with music streaming service Spotify to help music fans vote. American Spotify users received a message from President Barack Obama directing them to HeadCount.org for voter information.

HeadCount registers voters at concerts and sporting events. HeadCount also partnered with Ben & Jerry's to hand out free ice cream on a Phish tour to fans that registered or pledged to vote.

==== Participation Row ====
HeadCount manages Participation Row activism villages at various music festivals including Lockn' (2013, 2014, 2015, 2016) in Arrington, VA, True Music (2013) in Scottsdale, AZ, Phases of the Moon (2014) in Danville, IL, FloydFest (2016) near Floyd, VA the Okeechobee Music & Arts Festival in Okeechobee, FL, The Traveler's Rest Festival in Montana, and Newport Folk Festival and Newport Jazz Festival in Rhode Island.

Each Participation Row has also included a silent auction of signed merchandise, with proceeds going to the participating non-profits. At the Fare Thee Well shows, the Participation Row silent auction included a D'Angelico EX-DC electric guitar signed by all 7 performers and played by Bob Weir on stage during the second Santa Clara show. The auction for the guitar closed at $526,000, making it the 20th most expensive guitar of all time. For Dead & Company's 2023 Final Tour, ten unique D'Angelico guitars designed by AJ Masthay will be auctioned. Proceeds benefit both HeadCount as well as environmental activist group REVERB.

=== #SoundOff ===
Beyond concerts, HeadCount has a large presence on the Internet. Its blog features updates on "music, politics and everything in between," and it launched a platform called #SoundOff (www.SoundOffatCongress.org) for tweeting directly at members of Congress.

=== Webcast ===
In early 2012 HeadCount conceived and produced "The Bridge Session" a live performance from Bob Weir's TRI Studios featuring Weir, members of the National and various other guests. A live webcast on Yahoo! also featured a roundtable political discussion. The collaborations in that session led to Day of the Dead and Blue Mountain.

=== Capitol Community program ===
The non-profit also runs the "Capitol Community" program for the Capitol Theatre (Port Chester, New York), which sends school teachers to the Rock and Roll Hall of Fame and Museum for curriculum training.

== See also ==
- Get out the vote
- Head count
- VoteRiders
