= Global Rhythm =

American music and lifestyle magazine

- Categories: music magazine
- Founded: 1992
- Final issue: July 2008
- Company: Zenbu Media
- Country: United States
- Language: English
- Website: www.globalrhythm.net
- ISSN: 1553-9814

Global Rhythm was a former New York-based monthly music and lifestyle magazine featuring coverage of world music, film, cuisine and travel. It was published monthly and circulated across North America, Europe and hundreds of other locations worldwide for over fifteen years.

Ever since its beginnings in 1992 in the basement of a church in Cambridge, Massachusetts, Global Rhythm has provided its readership with information on the arts traditions of the world's many cultures. Each issue contains music and film reviews and articles on foreign film, international travel and ethnic cuisine. A typical issue may feature articles on subjects as varied as Uganda's Jewish community, the reggae musician Burning Spear, Maya cuisine, Scandinavia's blossoming music scene and Bollywood's latest films.

Each issue was accompanied by Global Rhythm on Disc, a full-length music compilation CD allowing subscribers to hear some of the music they were reading about. Recent musicians who have appeared on the sampler include Senegalese Afro-pop star Baaba Maal, Cuba's Buena Vista Social Club, India's Susheela Raman, Corsica's I Muvrini, Brazil's Gilberto Gil, Ireland's Chieftains and Cape Verde's Cesária Évora.

Global Rhythm was formerly called Rhythm Music Monthly, (RMM) a Boston-area free-distribution journal published by Kyle Russell, a local music promoter, starting in 1992. The first issues were essentially compendia of upcoming concerts with feature interviews of local musicians and artists. Over the next two years a number of other individuals joined the effort, including Warren Senders, who edited the magazine until the end of 1993 (under the pseudonym Warne Russell), Raphael Brickman (graphic design), Vijaya Sundaram, Tomi Osuna, Leigh Maher, Jonathan Shulman, David Rumpler and many others. Alecia J. Cohen, who had been with Rhythm Music Monthly from the beginning purchased the newsletter style magazine from Kyle Russell, and then relaunched as Global Rhythm magazine, offer a wider array of coverage inclusive of film, cuisine and travel. Alecia Cohen took over as publisher in the mid-1990s, and remained in this position until late 2005, when the company was then acquired by Zenbu Media and Steve Bernstein was named Publisher, with Alecia Cohen continuing on as Associate Publisher of Global Rhythm and Zenbu Media. The Editor in Chief 2002 to 2006 was Jeff Tamarkin. Tad Hendrickson followed as Editor in Chief from mid-2006 to its closing at the end of 2008. Alecia Cohen left publishing in 2009 and moved full-time to Morocco launching a private travel agency that specializes in music, culture and arts tours. The magazine ceased publication in 2008.
