= Head count =

Head count may refer to:

- Capite censi, a Latin expression referring to the non-nobility
- Head count (Australian rules football)
- HeadCount, a democracy non-profit organisation in the United States
- Head Count, a 2018 American horror film
