= Peter Shapiro (concert promoter) =

American concert promoter and club owner

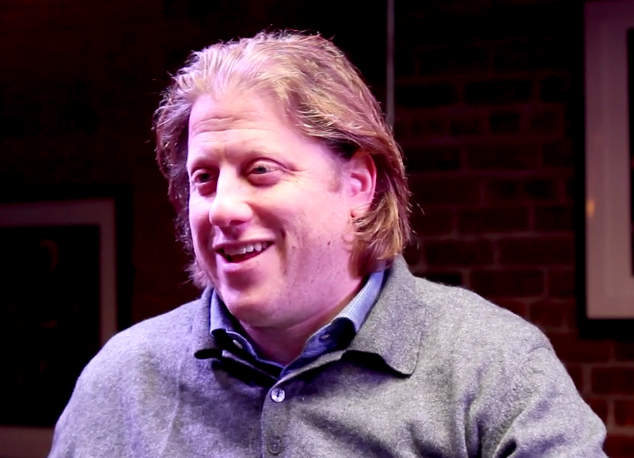
Peter Shapiro in 2016

Peter Shapiro (born September 7, 1972) is an American club owner, concert promoter, filmmaker, magazine publisher, author and entrepreneur from New York City. He is widely known as the promoter for Fare Thee Well: Celebrating 50 Years of the Grateful Dead, the Grateful Dead's 50th anniversary "final shows". Shapiro first gained renown through two films that screened at the Sundance Film Festival: Tie-Died: Rock 'n Roll's Most Deadicated Fans (1995) and American Road (1997). He has gone on to produce numerous other projects including U2 3D (2007) and All Access: Front Row. Backstage. Live! (2001). The Producers Guild of America identified him as one of "The Digital 25: Visionaries, Innovators and Producers of 2009". On June 8, 2016, Shapiro was honored at the annual gala of the BRIC Celebrate Brooklyn! Festival.

In 1996, Shapiro purchased New York City nightclub Wetlands Preserve. He currently owns the Brooklyn Bowl, Brooklyn Bowl Las Vegas and the Capitol Theatre. He has helped create such events as the Lockn' Festival, Jammy Awards, Jazz & Colors, the Green Apple Music Festival and Fare Thee Well. Billboard named Shapiro to its Power 100 list in 2015 and 2016 while in 2017 Variety placed him on its New Power of New York List.

Peter Shapiro currently serves as publisher of Relix magazine. He is also the founder of FANS, an online community with a focus on the live music experience. Shapiro's other ventures have included GreenOrder, The Hoodie Shop and Stone Fox Bride.

On July 8, 2019, he became chairman of HeadCount, the non-profit organization that works with musicians to promote participation in democracy, with a focus on registering voters at live music events.

In August 2022, Hachette published Shapiro's book, The Music Never Stops: What Putting on 10,000 Shows Has Taught Me About Life, Liberty and the Pursuit of Magic. Kirkus described The Music Never Stops, written with Dean Budnick, as “an entertaining insider's tour of the concert business from a likable guide.”

== Early life and career ==
Peter Shapiro, who grew up in New York City, is the grandson of Ezra Shapiro, a former world chairman of the Keren Hayesod (the world's largest fundraising organizations for Israel), and the great-grandnephew of Joel Elias Spingarn, one of the first Jewish leaders of the National Association for the Advancement of Colored People. Shapiro's father Daniel Shapiro was president of the Federation of Jewish Philanthropies, the predecessor of the UJA-Federation of New York, from 1983 to 1986.

Shapiro graduated from the Northwestern University School of Communications in 1995. During the summer between his sophomore and junior years, Shapiro shot the footage for his documentary debut And Miles To Go: On Tour with The Grateful Dead (1993). The project landed him an associate producer role on Tie-Died: Rock ‘n Roll's Most Deadicated Fans, which debuted at Sundance in 1995 before its national theatrical run. All screenings of Tie-Died were preceded by Shapiro's short film A Conversation with Ken Kesey, which originated during the making of And Miles To Go. Shapiro returned to Sundance in 1997 with American Road. This eight-minute short film, which he made with cinematographer Alex Cornfeld, presented images from the continental United States set to the Phish composition, "You Enjoy Myself."

== Wetlands Preserve ==
In 1996, while touring college campuses with Tie-Died, Shapiro learned that Larry Bloch, the founder of New York City nightclub Wetlands Preserve, was seeking to sell the venue. Wetlands had opened seven years earlier as a self-styled “eco-saloon,” which not only focused on music but also supported a not-for-profit Center for Social and Environmental Justice. Bloch tapped Shapiro to shepherd in the club's second era, despite the fact that the would-be owner had no prior club experience. When the club finally closed its doors in September 2001, The New York Times wrote, “the shuttering of Wetlands, which opened in 1989, is a major blow.”. The VW bus originally placed in the club as an information hub and a source of merchandise sales now resides in the Rock & Roll Hall of Fame. Shapiro and Bloch later appeared in the feature-length documentary Wetlands Preserved: The Story of An Activist Rock Club (2008) directed by Dean Budnick, which utilizes archival footage, soundboard recordings and the efforts of a dozen digital animators to present the story of the venue and later aired on the Sundance Channel

== Brooklyn Bowl, Brooklyn Bowl Las Vegas, Brooklyn Bowl London ==
In the years following the closure of Wetlands Preserve, Shapiro expressed his interest in owning another music venue that would develop its own unique identity. He achieved this goal in June 2009 with the opening of Brooklyn Bowl. Shapiro discovered the 20,000 foot space along with his partner, former Wetlands Preserve general manager Charley Ryan, while walking around the Williamsburg section of Brooklyn. Shapiro later recalled that The Hecla Iron Works Building built in 1882 “was a huge barn, no electricity, barely any plumbing. We just said, ‘This is it.’ You don't often find barns like that, even in the outer boroughs.” A two year renovation then followed, yielding a 600-capacity club with a 16-lane bowling alley and food provided by Blue Ribbon.

In addition to its high-end sound and high-def video screens, Brooklyn Bowl is LEED [Leadership in Energy and Environmental Design] certified green. As Shapiro has explained,

LEED sets pretty specific guidelines. It's one thing to adhere to them with a brand-new building, but it's difficult when you're updating all the electricity, plumbing, flooring, lighting, and air conditioning. All the electronics equipment has to be Energy Star rated. We're 100% wind-powered. We’ve put in a lot of natural light, sensors turn the lights off when there's daylight in the place. The sinks and toilets are all low-flow. The stage is made of recycled tires. We're not selling any bottled beers. We’ve installed bike slots. We use local labor. We use recycled materials in our furniture. It's very significant stuff.

On August 22, 2013, The New York Times reported that the Brooklyn Bowl would be expanding to Las Vegas and London. On March 8, 2014, Brooklyn Bowl Las Vegas debuted on the Strip with the club's signature Bowlive event, featuring Soulive and special guests, followed a few days later by a special show from Elvis Costello and The Roots. Brooklyn Bowl Las Vegas is a 2,000-capacity, two-story, 32 lane facility in an 80,000 square foot location within LINQ, Caesars Entertainment's retail, dining and entertainment space. In 2014 Brooklyn Bowl Las Vegas won the Las Vegas Weekly's readers' choice award for Best Live Venue. In 2015 Brooklyn Bowl Las Vegas was named Best Bowling Alley and Best Small Concert Venue in the Las Vegas Review-Journal “Best Of” Awards. It also was named Best Live Music Venue in Las Vegas by Travel + Leisure. Performers have included Kanye West, Jack White, John Legend, Jane's Addiction, Phil Lesh & Friends, Robert Plant, Trey Anastasio, Skrillex, Guns N' Roses, The Avett Brothers, Erykah Badu, Steve Winwood, Wyclef Jean, The String Cheese Incident, Tedeschi Trucks Band, Spoon, Pretty Lights, My Morning Jacket, Robert Randolph & The Family Band, Grace Potter & The Nocturnals, Gogol Bordello and Chromeo.

Brooklyn Bowl London is adjacent to the O2 Arena. The venue offers 12 lanes of bowling in a facility that holds 1000 patrons. The New York Times disclosed that Shapiro had signed a 15-year lease with AEG, which owns the O2. Brooklyn Bowl London offers after-shows along with other original music, while maintaining the signature offerings associated with the original Brooklyn Bowl, which Rolling Stone has named one of the Best Clubs in America and dubbed it "one of the most incredible places on earth. Brooklyn Bowl London has been able to host arena-level performers like Pharrell Williams, Lady Antebellum and Little Big Town within its relatively intimate concert space. It opened on January 16, 2014 with a special show featuring the Brooklyn Bowl All-stars, featuring members of Soulive and Antibalas, fresh from their run on Broadway in Fela!. Other artists who have appeared at the venue include Lauryn Hill, Phil Lesh, Talib Kweli, Lucinda Williams, Hothouse Flowers, Dinosaur Jr., Zebrahead, Gov't Mule, Less Than Jake, Maceo Parker, Umphrey's McGee, Robert Randolph & The Family Band, Dirty Dozen Brass Band and Deer Tick. Brooklyn Bowl's London outpost was shuttered after three years in 2017.

== The Capitol Theatre ==
Shapiro's next project came to fruition on September 4, 2012 when Bob Dylan took the stage to mark the re-opening of the Capitol Theatre in Port Chester, NY. The facility was built in 1926 and designed by one of the era's leading theater architects, Thomas W. Lamb. It first saw use as a concert space in 1970, hosting performances by The Grateful Dead, Pink Floyd, Janis Joplin and many others. Following a heyday of a few years, the facility experienced a brief resurgence in the 1990s with shows from Phish, Blues Traveler, Spin Doctors, Strangefolk and performances by The Rolling Stones and David Bowie as part of MTV's Live From The 10 Spot series. In late 2011 Shapiro entered into an agreement with owner Marvin Ravikoff (who had been using the building as a special events facility for weddings and bar mitzvahs) to re-open it as a music venue. Over the ensuing months, The New York Times reported, Shapiro “has spent more than $2 million renovating the 1,800-seat theater, which is 32 miles from Midtown Manhattan. He installed an arena-size lighting system, 10 high-definition projectors and an advanced sound system. The goal, he said, was to create ‘a psychedelic rock palace’ dedicated to live music, rather than theater.”

Opening night was originally slated for September 7, 2012, Shapiro's 40th birthday but the opportunity to put on a show with Dylan, who had previously used the theater as a tour rehearsal space, scuttled those plans by a few days.

On December 31, 2012, the media reported that Shapiro had purchased the building for $11.5 million from Ravikoff. Four months later after some additional renovation, Shapiro christened the theatre's new lobby bar and performance space as Garcia's in official tribute to the Grateful Dead guitarist. Jerry Garcia's daughter Trixie was on-hand and explained, "We chose to launch this idea at the Capitol because of its long and illustrious history with the Grateful Dead and the jam scene. We hope that it becomes a hub for the community to share stories and continue to build lifelong memories and friendships. Pete Shapiro and the Capitol Theatre staff were the appropriate partners to do this with because of our shared goals and his continued love and support of the Grateful Dead community. Just as important to note is the fact that Jerry's parents supported our family by owning and operating a bar in San Francisco in the 1940s and so it seemed right to reconnect with our family tradition." On May 16, 2013, the first public performance took place at Garcia's, with music from Reid Genauer and Friends.

== Bearsville Theater ==
In April 2024 Billboard announced that Shapiro “has added another room to his ever-expanding portfolio of classic venues, inking a long-term lease to manage and program the historic Bearsville Theater in Woodstock, NY.” The venue is part of the Bearsville Theater complex, which began in 1969 when legendary manager Albert Grossman (Bob Dylan, Janis Joplin, The Band) opened Bearsville Studios. Artists such as Patti Smith, The Rolling Stones, R.E.M. Todd Rundgren, Jeff Buckley and The Pretenders all recorded at the facility.

Lizzie Vann purchased Bearsville in 2019 and ran it for five years before enlisting Shapiro’s assistance. Shapiro’s first show was Don Was and the Pan-Detroit Ensemble on June 1, 2024. The initial roster of performers under Shapiro’s auspices also included Guster, Dawes_(band), Guided By Voices, Drive-By Truckers, Mdou Moctar, Mountain Goats, Guided By Voices, The Beths, The Jayhawks, Andy Frasco & The U.N., Dresden Dolls, The Zombies, and Rundgren. On June 29, Marco Benevento’s Follow The Arrow Festival moved to the theater from Accord, NY’s Arrowood Farms due to inclement weather.

== Lockn' ==
Shapiro, along with partner Dave Frey put on the inaugural Lockn' Music Festival, an Interlocking Music Festival, in Arrington, Virginia. The festival focused primarily on jambands and bringing together unique and new collaborations. Its inaugural event took place September 5–8, 2013, drew nearly 25,000 fans. It featured notable groups such as Furthur, Trey Anastasio Band, Gov't Mule, Widespread Panic featuring John Fogerty, The String Cheese Incident featuring Zac Brown, and The Black Crowes In 2014 the Lockn’ lineup included Tom Petty, Widespread Panic with Steve Winwood, The String Cheese Incident (with former Kool and The Gang vocalist JT Taylor), Phil Lesh & Friends, the Allman Brothers Band, Willie Nelson, Tedeschi Trucks Band, Wilco and Bill Kreutzmann's Locknstep Allstars. Lockn' 2015 featured Robert Plant & The Sensational Space Shifters, Phil Lesh & Friends with Carlos Santana, Mad Dogs & Englishmen: A Tribute to Joe Cocker feat. Tedeschi Trucks Band with Special Guests Leon Russell, Dave Mason, Rita Coolidge, Chris Robinson, Doyle Bramhall II & Friends, Billy & The Kids feat. Bob Weir, The Doobie Incident Featuring The String Cheese Incident and The Doobie Brothers, Jorma Kaukonen & Jack Casady Celebrate 50 Years of the Jefferson Airplane, Widespread Panic, St. Paul And The Broken Bones and Umphrey's McGee. In 2016, performers included: Phish, My Morning Jacket, Phil Lesh & Friends, Ween, Gary Clark Jr., Tedeschi Trucks Band, Peter Wolf, Joe Russo's Almost Dead, Umphrey's McGee, White Denim and Vulfpeck.

== Exclusive contract with Phil Lesh, Grateful Dead reunion ==
The November 3, 2013, issue of The New York Times reported that Phil Lesh, longtime bass player of The Grateful Dead, would play 45 shows at Peter Shapiro's venues. 30 of these shows would take place at The Capitol Theatre in Port Chester, NY, and the first at Brooklyn Bowl on November 14, 2013.

This relationship in turn led to Fare Thee Well: Celebrating 50 Years of the Grateful Dead. These shows paired the surviving members of the Grateful Dead: Bob Weir, Phil Lesh, Bill Kreutzmann and Mickey Hart, with Phish guitarist Trey Anastasio, Bruce Hornsby and Jeff Chimenti. The performances took place at Santa Clara's Levi Stadium on June 27 and 28, 2015 and Chicago's Soldier Field on July 3, 4 and 5, 2015. These performances marked the first time Weir, Lesh, Kreutzmann and Hart performed together since the Dead's 2009 tour and was publicized as the final time the musicians will all perform together.

The three shows in Chicago were initially announced on January 16, 2015, as the only performances. Tickets were first made available through the Grateful Dead's GDSTOO mail order system. Deadheads mailed in more than 60,000 envelopes, requesting a total of more than 360,000 tickets. As a result, only about one in ten requests was fulfilled. On February 28, 2015, when tickets became available on Ticketmaster, over 500,000 people logged on to purchase tickets, which set a new Ticketmaster record for ticket demand for a concert. Following the initial sellout of these concerts, seats were made available behind the stage, and prices on secondary ticket sites such as StubHub averaged $2,000 each.

Due to the high demand for the Chicago concerts, Shapiro announced two more concerts in Santa Clara, California on June 27 and 28, 2015. To help prevent scalpers from obtaining tickets for resale to these concerts, tickets were only made available through an online lottery. Tickets to the Santa Clara shows were initially sold at very high prices on StubHub but dropped closer to the concerts.

In response to the high demand for tickets to these concerts, they were simulcast on large screens at multiple concert venues in the United States as well as made available live, for a fee, on YouTube and various pay per view services. SiriusXM satellite radio also broadcast the concerts on their Grateful Dead channel. The pay-per-view set a new record for a music event with more than 400,000 subscriptions, surpassing a 1999 simulcast by the Backstreet Boys which drew 160,000 subscriptions.

The five performances were warmly received and President Obama acknowledged the band in a special message that appeared in the official program for the event on July 3, 2015. In the program, President Obama wrote "Here's to fifty years of the Grateful Dead, an iconic American band that embodies the creativity, passion, and ability to bring people together that makes American music so great. Enjoy this weekend's celebration of your fans and legacy. And as Jerry would say, 'Let there be songs to fill the air.'"

== FANS ==
A few days prior to the 2016 Lockn' festival, Shapiro announced his latest venture, FANS. Ben Sisario reported in the New York Times, that Shapiro, "one of the most successful and least button-down independent music promoters in the country, is introducing his latest venture this week, an online platform called Fans.com that lets users build profiles based on concerts they have attended and communicate with like-minded people via news feeds." The article also suggests that FANS will eventually expand into sports and other areas that generate similar loyalty and passion. In a letter posted to Fans.com the following day, Shapiro wrote, "While that feeling of community is a vital part of the live music experience, it is glaringly absent online. The current digital fan experience is all over the place. Artist news, event databases, touring information, fan communities and music streaming exist in separate silos, with no true place for fans to congregate. Because of this fragmentation, meaningful memories and connections are often lost...FANS is an online community for you to embrace your passion for live music, celebrate your personal concert history, discover new experiences and connect with like-minded fans. Whether you're a seasoned concertgoer or a casual listener, music provides a powerful path to happiness, community and memory. FANS is an open forum for self-expression and new discoveries for music-lovers of all stripes."

An April 2017 piece in WIRED, added that FANS "is Shapiro's attempt to teleport some of [his] kinetic live-show power to the web. Launched last year, the site is an ever-growing concert database that includes everything from this month's Chance the Rapper shows to, say, a 1960 Beatles gig in Hamburg, with many gigs documented via user-supplied photos and anecdotes. The goal is to build a single destination for concert lovers, who Shapiro says are often spread far across the web—either lingering on artist-specific sites like Little Monsters or Dead.net, or sharing everything via a decentralized stream of social media updates."

== The Jammy Awards, Green Apple Earth Day Festival and The Climate Rally ==
On June 22, 2000, the first annual Jammy Awards took place at New York's Irving Plaza. Shapiro and Dean Budnick created the show with the intention of celebrating the improvisational music scene then flourishing at Wetlands and on Budnick's Jambands.com website. The Jammys featured two components: the awards themselves were voted upon by the general public after an advisory board selected the nominees. In addition, the performances embraced the spirit of the night by presenting collaborations by celebrated musicians, who in many cases had not met until they first faced each other on stage. MTV reported of the first installment: “A virtual who's who of jam bands, related artists, presenters, producers, journalists, and fans came together Thursday at New York City's Irving Plaza for the genre's first awards show, the Jammys. Pushing aside the long-winded acceptance speeches associated with mainstream award shows, the Jammys let the music do the talking, as the evening's artists performed extended covers of their jamming forefathers.”

Over the years to follow the show moved to Roseland Ballroom and then The Theater at Madison Square Garden. Entertainment Weekly capped its coverage of the 2001 show by proclaiming, “Let's see the third Jammys on TV!” This did indeed happen as portions of the 2002 Jammys aired on HDNet. MSG Network later became an additional broadcast partner and Shapiro served as executive producer for a series of four DVDs taken from the show.

Notable collaborations over the years included Del McCoury Band with Robert Randolph and DJ Logic (2001), A dual-stage jam with Bob Weir's RatDog, Trey Anastasio, Warren Haynes, John Popper, Al Schnier, Matt Abts, DJ Logic, Mike Gordon, Robert Randolph, Jessica Lurie, Hope Clayburn and Skerik (2002) Perry Farrell and The String Cheese Incident (2004), The Disco Biscuits and Travis Tritt (2005) Grace Potter, Joe Satriani, Steve Kimock, Stephen Perkins, Willy Waldman and Reed Mathis (2007), Page McConnell, Roy Haynes, James Carter, Nicholas Payton and Christian McBride (2008). The final installment in 2008 saw the members of Phish appear together on a public stage for the first time in nearly four years.

When the sixth Jammys took place on April 20, 2006, the show kicked off a new event created by Shapiro, the Green Apple Music Festival. Produced in partnership with the Earth Day Network, Green Apple built on the Wetlands tradition of blending music and activism. The inaugural Green Apple Music & Arts festival was held at over 35 venues in the New York City from April 20–23. In 2007, Green Apple expanded to include Chicago and San Francisco. It expanded to eight cities the next year, with simultaneous events in New York City (Central Park), Washington DC (the National Mall), San Francisco (Golden Gate Park), Miami (Bicentennial Park), Dallas (Fair Park), Chicago (Lincoln Park Zoo), Denver (City Park), and Los Angeles (Santa Monica Pier). In 2009, the event announced that “in keeping with President Obama's Call to Service, Green Apple Festival will shift its main focus from Festivals to large‐scale Volunteer Action Projects on Earth Day weekend across the US.” Beyond local thank-you concerts for participants, the main musical focus took place at the National Mall where emcee Chevy Chase welcomed The Flaming Lips, moe., Los Lobos, DJ Spooky and Los Lobos along with Secretary of Labor Hilda Solis, EPA Administrator Lisa Jackson, Representative Edward Markey and many others.

In 2010, Shapiro spearheaded the next iteration of the event. The Climate Rally at the National Mall celebrated the 40th anniversary of Earth Day. Well over 100,000 were in attendance at the National Mall for music from Sting, John Legend, The Roots, Joss Stone, Jimmy Cliff and Mavis Staples along with speeches by James Cameron, Robert F. Kennedy Jr. and Rev. Jesse Jackson.

== Jazz & Colors ==
Shapiro conceived the idea for a free jazz festival in Central Park, that would coincide with the fall foliage. On November 10, 2012, the inaugural Central Park Jazz & Colors took place, featuring 30 bands playing a single common setlist. On October 16, 2013 The New York Times reported that Central Park Jazz & Colors would be returning to the park. The second year of the festival found Grateful Dead bassist Phil Lesh playing 30 minutes of unannounced music in the park, with Joe Russo and Soulive's Eric Krasno. Jazz & Colors moved indoors moving indoors to the Metropolitan Museum of Art, On January 30, 2015, for what was dubbed Jazz & Colors: The Masterworks Edition Jazz & Colors: Wave That Flag then took place on July 4, 2015, at the Field Museum in Chicago to coincide with Fare Thee Well: Celebrating 50 Years of the Grateful Dead, featuring area jazz musicians interpreting two common sets of music by the Grateful Dead.

== All Access, U2 3D and music on film ==
In addition to his career as a concert promoter, Shapiro has continued to pursue film projects. In 2001 along with his oldest brother Jon, he produced the IMAX concert film All Access: Front Row. Backstage. Live!. Peter served as musical director for the film, which brought some of the Jammys sensibility to the big screen, as many of the performances are collaborative, including Al Green and the Dave Matthews Band (Take Me to the River), B. B. King, Trey Anastasio and The Roots (Rock Me Baby), Carlos Santana and Rob Thomas ("Smooth"), Sting and Cheb Mami ("Desert Rose") and George Clinton and Parliament-Funkadelic with Mary J. Blige (Flashlight, One Nation Under a Groove, Atomic Dog).

In December 2001, Peter and Jon recorded Chick Corea's performances over three weeks at New York City's Blue Note, in which Corea celebrated his 60th birthday with nine separate combos, spanning his career. A live two-CD set earned Corea a Grammy, while the resulting film, Rendezvous in New York (2004), narrated by Jeff Goldblum included appearance from such jazz figures as: Bobby McFerrin, Joshua Redman, Terence Blanchard, Michael Brecker, Steve Gadd and Christian McBride.

They continued to work together over the years to follow, placing an increased emphasis on 3D technology, becoming partners in 3ality Digital. Their most high-profile collaboration to date was the 2007 concert film U2 3D. Shot in South America during the group's 2006 Vertigo Tour, U2 3D with up to 18 3D cameras utilized simultaneously, capturing digital footage. Peter initially pitched the idea to the group's director for visual content, Catherine Owens who would go on to direct along with Mark Pellington (Arlington Road, The Mothman Chronicles). The film premiered at the 2008 Sundance Film Festival (following a preview screening at the 2007 Cannes Film Festival). It received international release in 2008 through National Geographic Entertainment. Variety called it “Breathtaking when performance, technology and cinematography click at the same moment” and The New York Times dubbed it “The first Imax movie that deserves to be called a work of art.” It is one of the top 10 grossing concert films of all-time.

Many years later, in August 2021, Shapiro approached U2 lead vocalist Bono with the idea of the group opening the Sphere in Las Vegas. U2:UV Achtung Baby Live at Sphere debuted on September 29, 2023 with 36 performances scheduled through February 18, 2024.

Following U2 3D, the Shapiros continued to explore the use of 3D for capturing live entertainment. On December 4, 2008, they broadcast the first-ever live 3D football game to theaters in Los Angeles, New York and Boston, pitting the Oakland Raiders against the San Diego Chargers. A few weeks later they brought the BCS Championship game between Florida and Oklahoma to 80 theatres across the country. A year later, on March 30, 2010, the Black Eyed Peas became the first music group to simulcast a live concert in 3D, as their sold-out performance at the Staples Center in Los Angeles reached audiences across the nation via Regal Cinema theatres.

Shapiro also served as a producer for Sheryl Crow: C’mon America (2003), And You Don't Stop: 30 Years of Hip-Hop (2004), Dion: Live (2004) and Toots and The Maytals – True Love (2004). During the summer of 2004 he also brought some performances from the SummerStage series in Central Park to the air for the first time in the facility's 19-year history. The hour-long Live From Central Park SummerStage aired on New York's WABC-TV on six successive Saturday nights at 11:35, with performances by Ben Folds, Guster, Rufus Wainwright, Devo, the Yeah Yeah Yeahs and Stellastarr. In 2009 he co-produced the videos that appeared at We Are One: The Obama Inaugural Celebration at the Lincoln Memorial and also aired on HBO.

== Relix ==
In April 2009, Shapiro became the principal owner of Relix magazine. He purchased the magazine (along with Relix.com and Jambands.com) from Steve Bernstein who had announced its closing two months earlier due to financial constraints. Shapiro became publisher, heading a staff that also included current editors Dean Budnick and Mike Greenhaus, Associate Publisher Rachel Seiden and former editor Josh Baron.

Founded in 1974, Relix is currently the second longest running magazine devoted to rock music published in the United States.

== HeadCount, Rock Hall and other Nonprofit work ==
Shapiro has maintained a steady slate of volunteer efforts. For a number of years he served on the board of directors of the City Parks Foundation Arts Committee, a 501(c)(3) nonprofit that creates programs throughout the five boroughs of New York City. He was a founding board member of HeadCount, advising the “a non-partisan organization that uses the power of music to register voters and promote participation in democracy” and in July 2019, he became chairman of the board. He also is a member of the Rock and Roll Hall of Fame nominating committee.

== Jam The Vote, Women's March, March for Science ==
On the evening of November 6, 2016, just 36 hours prior to the general election, Shapiro produced a special, innovative Jam The Vote event at the Capitol Theatre, working with Preservation Hall Jazz Band Musical Director Ben Jaffe, and HeadCount Executive Director Andy Bernstein. Preservation Hall Jazz Band and Blind Boys Of Alabama served as house band with guests that included Questlove, Win Butler, Craig Finn, Eugene Hutz, Nicole Atkins and Robert Randolph.

The show was available for free via an innovative live stream in which viewers were asked to pledge to vote in order to gain access to the multi-camera broadcast. Once logged in they were also able to learn additional information about their polling place, including ID requirements to vote.

On January 21, 2017, Shapiro oversaw the filming and live streaming of the 2017 Women's March on Washington. The stream was available on Facebook, YouTube and through multiple major media outlets. On April 22, 2017, he served as producer for the March for Science event in Washington, D.C.

== The Music Never Stops ==
Hachette released Shapiro's book, The Music Never Stops: What Putting on 10,000 Shows Has Taught Me About Life, Liberty and the Pursuit of Magic, co-authored by Dean Budnick, on August 2, 2022. Variety reported that “based on 50 pivotal shows which helped define Shapiro's life and guide his businesses, the book chronicles a career lived at maximum volume.” Spin added, “Shapiro talks eloquently and honestly about what he's learned along the way, peppering the text with one amazing anecdote after another.” The Music Never Stops “covers a good amount of ground; through industry consolidation and disruptive changes that occurred in advances, venue operations, ticketing and touring. It also provides invaluable insight for those looking to enter into the live music and event business…what sets this apart is Shapiro's willingness to admit where he didn't hit the note or when he wasn't as sure of his ability as people might have thought. It's honest, enlightening, funny, and filled with fun facts that seem to appear on every single page.”

== Personal life ==
Shapiro, a New York City native, resides in Manhattan with his wife, Shore Fire Media Vice President Rebecca Shapiro, and their children, Roxy and Simon.
