= Metal Maniacs =

American magazine

- Metal Maniacs cover of March 1989
- Categories: Music magazine
- Founder: Mike Greenblatt and Katherine Ludwig
- Founded: 1989
- Final issue: February 2009
- Country: United States
- Based in: Manhattan, New York City
- Language: English
- ISSN: 1559-4297

Metal Maniacs was an American magazine that was based around heavy metal music.

== History ==
Founded in 1989 by Mike 'G' Greenblatt and Katherine Ludwig of Metal Shop. Where its sister publication Metal Edge largely covered glam metal, Metal Maniacs focused largely on covering the more extreme sub-genres of heavy metal such as thrash and death metal genres. Originally a Sterling publication, it was acquired by Zenbu Media in February 2007. The magazine's editorial board was based in Manhattan, New York City, and published ten issues per year.

In contrast to Metal Edge, which largely consisted of pinup photos of the era's more commercial stars such as Bon Jovi and Poison, Metal Maniacs focused predominantly on thrash metal bands and aimed to "treat (metal fans) like human beings that might possibly have something to say," according to Ludwig. The magazine featured a letters section in which serious discussions about the metal scene and politics could take place. Ludwig also used the publication as a personal pulpit of sorts, stating "I also liked to get in something about vegetarianism, hemp, feminism, and freedom of speech when I could."

In February 2009, it was announced that publisher Zenbu Media would cease publication of Metal Maniacs, along with the magazine's larger, more renowned sister publication, Metal Edge. The company did not issue a statement to its readers, nor issue any refunds for subscribers. Associate editor JJ Koczan went on to found his own online magazine, The Obelisk, in January 2009.

== Digital relaunch ==
In 2010, the domain name of the magazine was put online again under new management from MetalHit.com. Metal Maniacs was revamped into a webzine without any involvement from its founders or previous writers.

In December 2011, To 11 Media, Inc. purchased Metal Maniacs and Metal Edge from Zenbu Media and continues to publish both magazines in electronic formats.
