= Red (God Street Wine album) =

Studio album by God Street Wine
- Released: 1996
- Genre: Rock
- Label: Six Feet of Snow Music; Mercury
- Producer: God Street Wine

God Street Wine chronology
$1.99 Romances (1994)	Red (1996)	God Street Wine (1997)

Red is an album by the American band God Street Wine. Initially put out in 1995 via the band's label, it was picked up by Mercury Records the following year, after Danny Goldberg caught their show at the Beacon Theatre.

The band promoted the album by touring with Fun Lovin' Criminals, the H.O.R.D.E. Festival, and the Allman Brothers.

== Production ==
God Street Wine produced the album, and recorded it in their upstate New York home studio. The band—allegedly dropped by Geffen Records due to low sales of $1.99 Romances and the fact that they shared a management team with Mojo Nixon (who had just recorded "Bring Me the Head of David Geffen")—desired simply to test the new studio and to hash out their feelings about their career status.

== Critical reception ==
Professional ratings
Review scores
Source	Rating
AllMusic	1.5/5 stars
The Indianapolis Star	3.5/4 stars
MusicHound Rock: The Essential Album Guide	3/5 stars

The Washington Post thought that "the freewheeling cuts that evoke memories of Garcia and the Dead, coupled with the reggae tracks that bear Marley's imprint, help compensate for a few songs in which GSW takes itself a bit too seriously." Trouser Press stated: "Whether the group was finally ready to move itself forward or the corporate divorce sparked a leap of creative development, Red is the first God Street Wine record worth owning." The Arkansas Democrat-Gazette deemed God Street Wine "a fashionably sloppy band," and the album "really borderline embarrassing."

The Record opined that "the tracks are anything but seamless—it's pretty hard to have Dylan melt into disco without missing a beat or two—and the ill-advised experiments outweigh the good ones." The Indianapolis Star wrote: "Call it pop or rock or transitional folk, this album offers varied and infectious melodies." Rolling Stone determined that, "with his nasal, breathy voice, lead singer Lo Faber can effectively ape monsters of album-oriented rock." The Tulsa World labeled Red "a fascinating record of a band of road rats finding a beautiful and versatile voice in the studio." The Plain Dealer considered "Ru4 Real?" "a blue-eyed funk throwaway that sounds too close to Leo Sayer for comfort."

AllMusic wrote that, "while eclectic and experimental, the stylistic differences between the songs create friction and a lack of continuity rather than a sense of direction."

== Track listing ==
No.	Title	Length
1.	"Get on the Train"
2.	"Red & Milky White"
3.	"Ru4 Real?"
4.	"Untitled Take Two"
5.	"Which Way Will She Go?"
6.	"Chop!"
7.	"Don't Tell God"
8.	"Girl on Fire"
9.	"Maybe"
10.	"Made of Blood"
11.	"When the White Sun Turns to Red"
