= Metal Edge =

American magazine

- Categories: Music magazine
- Founded: January 1985
- Final issue: February 2009
- Company: Project M Group
- Country: United States
- Language: English
- Website: metaledgemag.com
- ISSN: 1068-2872

Metal Edge was a magazine covering heavy metal music published by Zenbu Media. The magazine was founded in the summer of 1985, during the height of glam metal's success. While its sister publication, Metal Maniacs focused more on extreme subgenres of heavy metal such as thrash metal and death metal, Metal Edge focused more on glam metal and traditional heavy metal. The magazine was originally edited by Gerri Miller, and later by Paul Gargano.

The magazine was originally published by Sterling Publications, which merged with the Macfadden Group in 1992 to become Sterling/Macfadden. Zenbu Media acquired Metal Edge in February 2007. In September 2007, the magazine underwent a redesign. In February 2009, Zenbu Media closed down, taking Metal Edge and Metal Maniacs down with them.

Gerri Miller died in 2021. In November 2021, Gargano announced that the Metal Edge brand had been acquired by Project M Group, and it was subsequently relaunched as an online-only publication in January 2022.
