= Dean Budnick =

American writer, filmmaker, and professor

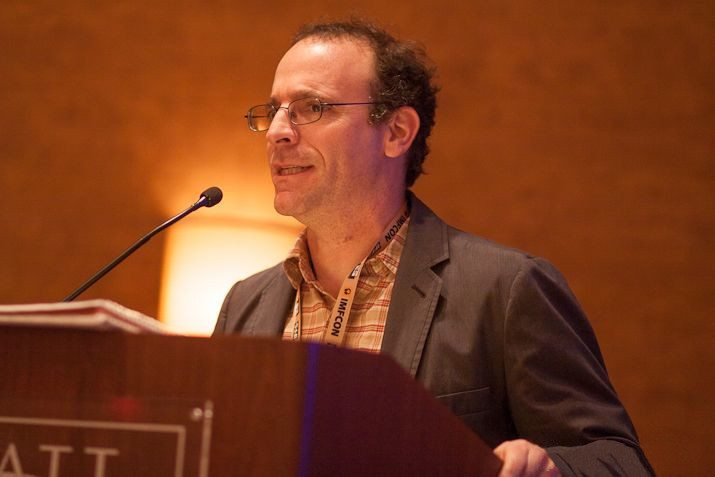
- Dean Budnick delivers keynote at 2012 International Music Festival Conference.

Dean Budnick is an American writer, filmmaker, college professor, podcast creator and radio host who focuses on music, film and popular culture. Budnick, who is editor-in-chief of Relix, grew up in East Greenwich, Rhode Island.

== Ticket Masters ==
In April 2012, Plume/Penguin published the revised, expanded edition of Budnick's latest book, Ticket Masters: The Rise of the Concert Industry and How the Public Got Scalped, in North America and the U.K. ECW Press issued the original hardcover edition of the book, co-authored with Josh Baron, in 2011. Ticket Masters explores the emergence of computerized ticketing and the rise of the modern concert industry. It is the first book to chronicle the origins, development and ongoing strategies of companies such as Ticketron, Ticketmaster, Live Nation and StubHub, the efforts of numerous independent competitors and bands such as the Grateful Dead, the String Cheese Incident and Phish. The Wall Street Journal reviewer Ken Kurson wrote, "A clear, comprehensive look at a murky business, the book is also an encyclopedia of information about the rise, decline and rebirth of the live music industry." Similar assessments appeared in Rolling Stone, Maclean's, Pollstar, and other outlets. A revised expanded paperback edition was published by Plume in 2012. Budnick has gone on to appear as a panelist and deliver keynotes about the subject at numerous industry events, including: CMJ, the Ticket Summit, the International Ticketing Association Conference (INTIX), the IAVM Arena Management Conference, by:Larm and the International Music Festival Conference. He has commented about ticketing issues for a variety of media outlets. and also has lectured on this topic at college campuses. Budnick continues to write about ticketing and the concert industry for Billboard, The Hollywood Reporter, Variety and Bloomberg View.

== Roscoe "Fatty" Arbuckle ==
Budnick has explained that the idea for Ticket Masters first came to him in the mid-1990s, while a graduate student at Harvard University's History of American Civilization program, when he explored reports of ticket scalping on Charles Dickens' final American speaking tour. Budnick happened upon such accounts (as well as those related to the "Swedish Nightingale" Jenny Lind) while writing his doctoral dissertation on Roscoe "Fatty" Arbuckle. In Directed Verdict: The Roscoe "Fatty" Arbuckle Trial Discourse, Budnick, who also earned a J.D. at Columbia Law School, worked from the original trial transcripts, dozens of newspaper reports and other primary sources to explore the silent film comic's life before and after his manslaughter trials that followed the death of actress Virginia Rappe on September 9, 1921. Directed Verdict examines not only on prevailing attitudes towards Hollywood and a new culture of celebrity but also tabloid journalism, the onset of Prohibition and the emerging, oft-contradictory roles of women in the 1920s. Budnick received his PhD in 2000 and his dissertation committee consisted of Henry Louis Gates, Werner Sollors and Ellen Fitzpatrick.

After serving as a teaching fellow and tutor at Harvard, Budnick has gone on to teach at the Massachusetts College of Art and Design, Roger Williams University and the University of Rhode Island.

== Long May They Run podcast ==
In September 2019, Variety announced that Budnick would be the writer and host of a new podcast titled Long May They Run. The piece noted that "Cadence13 launched the music-themed, documentary-style podcast, with a focus on bands that thrive in the live setting". Phish is the subject of season one. Variety added that the season "will offer a deep dive into the history of Phish as well as its impact on music culture, the industry and beyond," through over 75 interviews, including those with the band members and management. Season one launched on September 16 with "A Pattern Language" and "A Timeless Way of Building" the first two episodes of the 10 slated for the season. The series immediately topped the Apple podcast U.S. music charts and The New York Times named it one of six notable podcasts to launch that month. Billboard noted, "Long May They Run, Season One: Phish tracks the band's evolution into becoming one of the most influential touring bands of all time...The 10-episode series shows how Phish laid the foundation for the modern day festival business." Radiohead guitarist Ed O'Brien told the Toronto Sun, "I've been really inspired by Phish and there's a great podcast called Long May They Run, and it's all about Phish and their story and their philosophy and their credo." Vampire Weekend frontman Ezra Koenig selected it as one of his current "cultural highlights" in a piece for The Guardian, noting "I've been loving this podcast about the band Phish. They did a lot of interviews with the guys in the band, and there's so many cool little stories, so you get a window into the amazing live culture they've built."

== John Popper memoir ==
In December 2015, Billboard published an exclusive cover reveal for Suck and Blow: And Other Stories I'm Not Supposed To Tell, the autobiography of longtime Blues Traveler frontman John Popper, which Budnick co-authored. The New York Post hailed Popper's "off-beat, hilarious new memoir" in a two-page review. Budnick and Popper later discussed the book during an event at New York City's Strand Bookstore. Popper supported Suck and Blow with numerous media appearances, including a performance on Jimmy Kimmel Live! on which Popper played alongside vice-presidential candidate Tim Kaine. The Post later named Suck and Blow to its list of "The 40 best books of 2016 you must read immediately."

== Peter Shapiro: The Music Never Stops ==
On August 2, 2022, Hachette released The Music Never Stops: What Putting on 10,000 Shows Has Taught Me About Life, Liberty and the Pursuit of Magic, by Peter Shapiro co-authored by Budnick. Variety reported that "based on 50 pivotal shows which helped define Shapiro's life and guide his businesses, the book chronicles a career lived at maximum volume." Spin added, "Shapiro talks eloquently and honestly about what he's learned along the way, peppering the text with one amazing anecdote after another." The Music Never Stops "covers a good amount of ground; through industry consolidation and disruptive changes that occurred in advances, venue operations, ticketing and touring. It also provides invaluable insight for those looking to enter into the live music and event business...what sets this apart is Shapiro's willingness to admit where he didn't hit the note or when he wasn't as sure of his ability as people might have thought. It's honest, enlightening, funny, and filled with fun facts that seem to appear on every single page." Kirkus described The Music Never Stops as "an entertaining insider's tour of the concert business from a likable guide."

== Grateful Dead: liner notes, journalism and novel ==
Budnick has contributed liner notes to the Grateful Dead's RFK box set, GarciaLive Volume Eight and GarciaLive Volume Sixteen (he previously drafted liners for Matisyahu, Spin Doctors, and others). A chapter on the Grateful Dead's pioneering mail-order ticketing service appears in Ticket Masters. Budnick's 2017 Billboard piece on the band explored the group's licensing deals with Warner/Rhino Entertainment and additional plans for its intellectual property. In 2017 he also wrote a Relix cover story on Dead & Company, which followed up his earlier cover stories on the band. His other related articles include interviews with Grateful Dead lyricist Robert Hunter and pieces that have focused on Brent Mydland and the missing soundboard tapes recorded by Betty-Cantor Jackson, His conversation with Deadhead Bill Walton appeared in Relix Conversation video series, while previous installments with Warren Haynes & John Scofield and Luther Dickinson & Anders Osborne all touched on their time performing in Phil Lesh and Friends. In 2015 Budnick served as editor of the official Fare Thee Well daily programs, securing a welcome message from President Obama. He served in a similar capacity for the Dead reunion shows at Alpine Valley in 2002.

The 2015 Billboard piece that first shared the cover for John Popper's memoir also revealed that Budnick's next project was a Grateful-Dead themed novel. Rare Bird Books published Might As Well in the spring of 2016. One reviewer described it as "a highly entertaining (and wildly funny) fictionalized multi-character account of a Grateful Dead show, which details the experience of both the lot scene and an actual show (for those who could get tickets) at Brendan Byrne Arena in the fall of 1989." Budnick later revealed in an interview that the general excitement from the Fare Thee Well shows had inspired him to revisit the band's touring days. The era that provides the backdrop to Might As Well is the same time period Budnick subsequently wrote about in the box set Robert F. Kennedy Stadium, Washington, D.C., July 12 & 13, 1989.

== Wetlands Preserved ==
In 2004 his interest in film and an ongoing focus on live music led Budnick to begin work on the feature-length documentary Wetlands Preserved: The Story of An Activist Rock Club. Budnick directed the film, which utilized archival footage, soundboard recordings and the efforts of a dozen digital animators to relate the story of Tribeca nightclub Wetlands Preserve. The documentary also includes music and interviews with Dave Matthews, Bob Weir, Questlove and Warren Haynes as well as members of Phish, moe., Agnostic Front, 311, the Disco Biscuits and many others. Wetlands Preserved, shown at such festivals as SXSW, Woodstock and Asheville (where it won top documentary honors), was released to theatres by First Run Features on March 14, 2008. The New York Times wrote, "Wetlands Preserved is a fond account of the rising, thriving and eventual closing of the TriBeCa club known as the Wetlands Preserve." Other positive reviews appeared in the New York Daily News, Newsday and additional outlets. Wetlands Preserved was later acquired for television by the Sundance Channel.

== Jambands, the Jammy Awards and Relix ==
While still a graduate student, Budnick wrote two books, The Phishing Manual (Hyperion, 1996) and Jam Bands (ECW Press, 1998). In the summer of 1998, shortly before the publication of the second book, Budnick created Jambands.com along with webmaster Andy Gadiel (who would go on to create the JamBase website). Budnick is often said to have coined the term jam band. However, in 2003, with the publication of an expanded edition of Jambands (Backbeat Books, 2003) and later in Peter Conners book JAMerica (Da Capo, 2013), Budnick indicated that he only popularized it, although he is responsible for recasting it as a single word.

During the summer of 1999, Budnick produced the Jambands.com tour, which traveled from Maine to Maryland over two weeks and featured performances by such groups as the Disco Biscuits, the Slip, STS9, Deep Banana Blackout and Percy Hill with special appearances by Allman Brothers Band members Butch Trucks and Oteil Burbridge (Budnick later served as board member for Trucks' Flying Frog Records). In 2000 Budnick created the Jammy Awards along with Wetlands owner Peter Shapiro. The inaugural edition of this awards show took place on June 22, 2000, at Irving Plaza, where Budnick co-hosted with the musician Peter Prince while wearing a tuxedo, a tradition Budnick would repeat at every Jammys. Over successive years the Jammys would move to the Roseland Ballroom and then to the Theater at Madison Square Garden, where, in its final installment in 2008, Phish received the Lifetime Achievement Award on the eve of the band's announcement that it would return to the stage after a four-year hiatus.

In 2001 Budnick also began his ongoing association with Relix magazine, which acquired Jambands.com. His Relix cover stories have included profiles of Phish, Dead & Company, Phil Lesh and Bob Weir, Robert Plant and Alison Krauss, Ben Harper and Rhiannon Giddens, Jack White, Sturgill Simpson, Billy Strings, Dave Matthews Band, Chris Stapleton, Tedeschi Trucks Band, and many others. Budnick has also collaborated with Relix publisher and The Music Never Stops co-author Peter Shapiro on cover stories devoted to Questlove, Lukas Nelson and Joe Russo's Almost Dead.

In his role at Relix he created the official Bonnaroo Music Festival daily newspaper, the Bonnaroo Beacon which debuted at the first year of the festival and event newspapers for Phish's festivals, the Grateful Dead's 2002 Terrapin Station reunion shows and Dave Matthews Band. Budnick edited the three daily programs for Fare Thee Well: Celebrating 50 Years of the Grateful Dead in Chicago on July 3–5, 2015, in which the surviving members of the Grateful Dead—Bob Weir, Phil Lesh, Bill Kreutzmann and Mickey Hart—were joined by Trey Anastasio, Bruce Hornsby and Jeff Chimenti. Budnick secured a special message by President Barack Obama which appeared in the program. (He later explained, "The whole thing was a surprise. I wanted to keep it from the band members until they saw it in the program....It all happened rather quickly. It made perfect sense to me since Chicago is the President's town and the 'Core Four' had been supportive of his initial campaign. Back in October 2008 Bob Weir, Phil Lesh, Bill Kreutzmann and Mickey Hart reunited to perform at the Change Rocks event for then-candidate Barack Obama. They later took the stage at the Mid-Atlantic Inaugural ball in January 2009. So I contacted the White House, described the event, although they seemed quite aware of it, and received the message a day later. They even sent along the official image to run with the President's words.")

He programmed the Live Soundtrack Cinema at the inaugural Lockn' Festival, a film tent that designed to "unite the musical side with the visual side by having the audio feed from the stage playing as specifically-selected features, shorts and animated films that complement the music are screened." At the second Lockn' Festival, he edited the official four-day festival newspaper, The Lockn' Times, which debuted that year and then continued.

Budnick is also a home brewer, who collaborated with fellow craft beer enthusiast, the String Cheese Incident keyboard player Kyle Hollingsworth, and SweetWater Brewing Company on Ground Score IPA, which SweetWater distributed in 4-packs of 16 oz. cans.

In July 2020, he worked with Jazz Foundation of America artistic director Steve Jordan and Peter Shapiro on the livestream, Red White Black & Blues — a 16-hour journey through Black American live music.

== Jam Nation Radio ==
In the fall of 2000, Budnick and Jefferson Waful began co-hosting the Jam Nation radio show. Jam Nation originated from WMRQ in Hartford, Connecticut, where it aired Sunday nights from 8 to 10 PM. Twice a month the show hosted a one-hour electric performance from musical acts, with appearances by such groups as Derek Trucks Band, STS9, Galactic, Keller Williams and Umphrey's McGee (for whom Waful would eventually become lighting director). Jam Nation was soon syndicated on the fledgling XM Satellite network where it aired until 2009, ending its run following XM's merger with SIRIUS. He continues to make guest DJ appearances on SiriusXM.
