= Brooklyn Bowl =

Music venue and bowling alley in Brooklyn, New York

- Interactive map of Brooklyn Bowl
- Address: 61 Wythe Avenue
- Location: Brooklyn, New York 11249
- Coordinates: 40.72188°N 73.957424°W
- Owner: Peter Shapiro
- Seating type: Standing
- Capacity: 600

Construction
- Opened: July 7, 2009

Website
- brooklynbowl.com

Brooklyn Bowl is a music venue, bowling alley and restaurant in the Williamsburg neighborhood of Brooklyn, New York. Founded in 2009, it is located in the former Hecla Iron Works Building at 61 Wythe Avenue. It is known for its high-tech green construction and variety of musical acts. In 2013 Rolling Stone named Brooklyn Bowl the 20th best music club in the United States.

There are additional locations in Las Vegas, Nashville, and Philadelphia.

== Hecla Iron Works Building ==
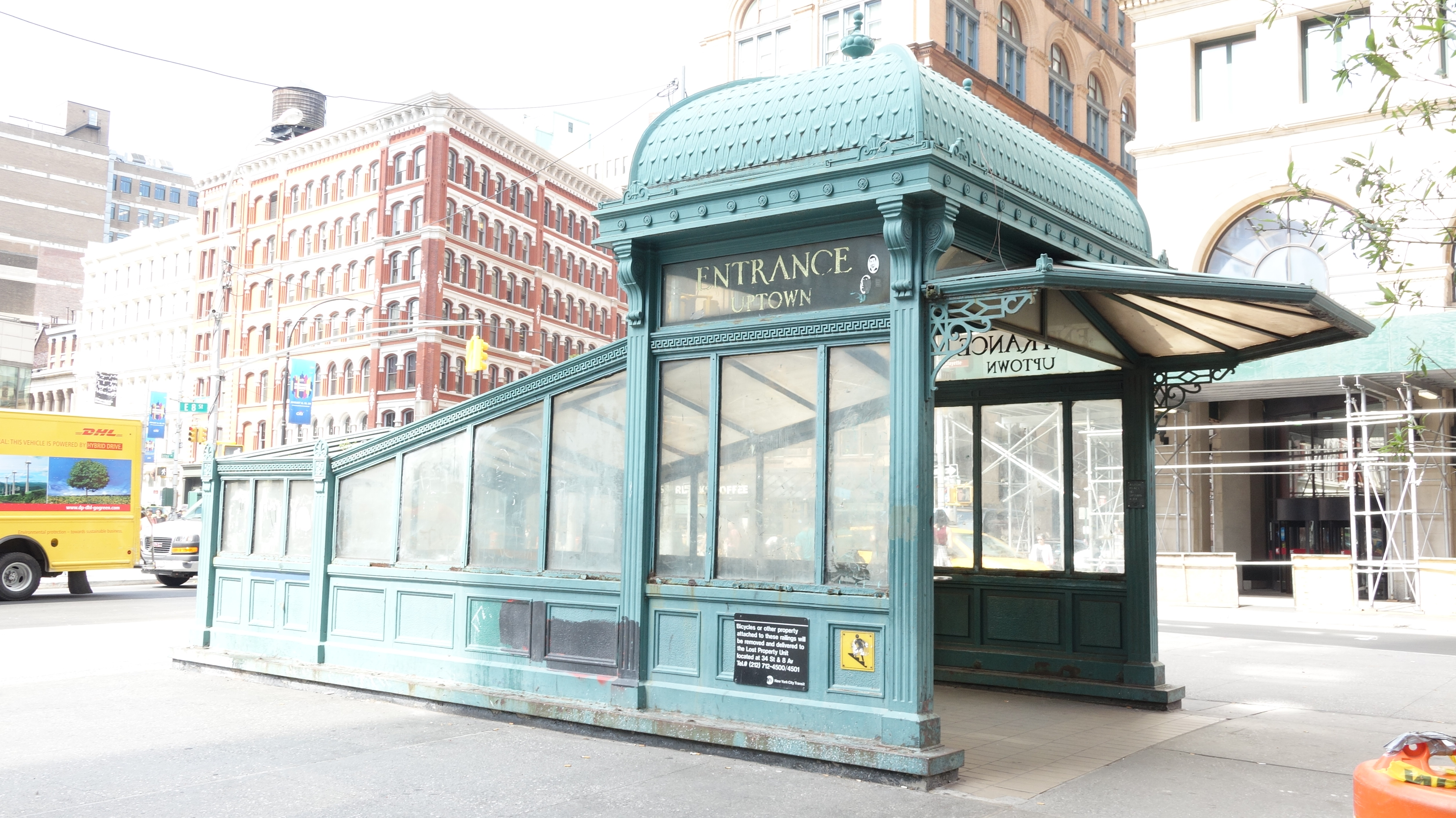
The Astor Place station uptown entrance, a reproduction of an old IRT subway entrance as built by the Hecla Iron Works.

The building was home to Hecla Iron Works, founded in 1876 by Scandinavians Neils Poulson (1843-1911) and Charles Eger (1843-1916). It was named after an active volcano in Iceland, Mount Hekla. By 1889 the works had grown to a large complex taking up most of a city block. Following two fires, Poulson, who had a background in architecture and engineering, began experimenting with fire-proof design. The replacement building was innovative, combining non-combustible brick, plaster and iron in a single foundry structure built in 1892 and other buildings completed in 1896-97.

Throughout the main structure samples are found of the products made at Hecla. Staircases, fire escapes, manhole covers, street gratings, subway kiosks and the cast iron frameworks for elevators came from the Hecla Ironworks factory and were shipped by barge across the river from the Greenpoint Avenue piers. The 133 original subway entrance and exit shelters, built for the Interborough Rapid Transit Company prior to the New York City Subway's 1904 opening, were fashioned there and assembled in place on location. Street lampposts, fences, balustrades, door facades, security gates and sidewalk clocks were all available by catalog. Many older buildings in New York still have iron stairways and elevators created by Hecla that are still in use. Until the advent of terracotta as a prime ornamental building material, the industry was competitive with other ironwork factories supplying the trade from Brooklyn, manufacturing all manner of iron works for the building trades. Hecla merged its foundry with a rival firm in 1913; the new firm was named Hecla-Winslow. Poulson gave ownership to The American-Scandinavian Foundation which sold it in 1928 to the Carl H. Schultz Mineral Water Company. In 1929, Schultz merged with the owner of Dr. Brown's and Brownie Chocolate Drink to create the American Beverage Corporation.

In 1989 the upper floors of the four-story building were converted into residential space to serve the rapidly gentrifying neighborhood. The building was made a New York City designated landmark on June 8, 2004 for the Bower–Barff process used on the facade which imparted a black velvety surface to cast iron that did not require painting.

== Conversion to bowling alley ==
By 2005 Williamsburg had evolved a nascent hipster scene. During the early 2000s, the neighborhood became a center for indie rock and electroclash. Peter Shapiro, a former owner of the Tribeca nightclub Wetlands Preserve and Charley Ryan, the venue's General Manager, discovered the vacant iron foundry, originally built in 1882 while walking around Williamsburg. The pair teamed with fellow founding partners Alex and Arthur Cornfeld for a two-year renovation of the space that they opened as Brooklyn Bowl on July 7, 2009. It was the first bowling alley in the country, and possibly the world, to be LEED certified with its pinspotter machines using 75% less energy than typical pinspotters.

The concert stage floor was built using recycled truck tires, and is lit entirely by LEDs. Much of the rest of the establishment was constructed using recycled materials, including glass reclaimed from the Brooklyn Navy Yard and custody-controlled wooden floor boards reclaimed from the original ironworks building in which it now stands.

In 2010 former President Bill Clinton held a benefit at Brooklyn Bowl for the Clinton Foundation Millennium Network. In February 2016, Clinton returned to Brooklyn Bowl to hold a fundraiser for his wife Hillary Clinton for the 2016 Presidency.

== Features ==
Brooklyn Bowl has over two thousand square feet of floor space that includes a sixteen-lane bowling alley, operating alongside the music floor. The 600 capacity music hall has hosted numerous notable acts, including Guns N' Roses, Elvis Costello, The Roots and RJD2.

The bars serve only draught beers brewed within Brooklyn, and in 2010 it was reported the establishment was the biggest seller of Brooklyn-based beer.

The venue also features food service run by the popular citywide chain Blue Ribbon, including a restaurant area which seats approximately 60 people.

== Other locations ==
Brooklyn Bowl opened additional locations in London and Las Vegas in 2014. The London site closed in January 2017.

In June 2020, a fourth location was opened in Nashville, Tennessee, overlooking First Horizon Park, a ballpark which is home to the Nashville Sounds Minor League Baseball team.

In November 2021, a fifth location opened in Philadelphia.
