= Live at the Fillmore (Vida Blue album) =

Live album / Video album by Vida Blue
- Released: 2004
- Recorded: June 5, 2004
- Venue: The Fillmore; San Francisco, California
- Label: Image Entertainment
- Producer: Page McConnell, Mike Drumm

Vida Blue chronology
The Illustrated Band (2003)	Live at the Fillmore (2004)	Crossing Lines (2019)

Live at the Fillmore is a DVD from Vida Blue, a trio led by Phish keyboardist Page McConnell.

The video features a sold-out performance at San Francisco, California's The Fillmore captured on June 5, 2004. The trio was joined by the Spam Allstars, an Afro-Cuban sextet from Miami. During the performance, the band invited former Oakland A's pitcher Vida Blue, the band's namesake, onstage and behind the scenes to meet the band for the first time.

The video also includes a 40-minute bonus DVD featuring footage from McConnell's stock car racing organization - "Team Vida Blue" - and footage from a 2004 Enduro race from Vermont's Thunder Road racetrack.

== Reception ==
In a review for Jambands.com, Benjy Eisen wrote: "happenstance and fortune shine on this jewel of a concert film... The band puts in a fiery performance... Most events really aren't planned. At least, most of the good ones anyway. Live at the Fillmore being one of them."

Live Music's Justin Ward stated: "I love the techno-synth that is Vida Blue, and the Spam Allstars add a whole new element to their sound that is really rock solid."

== Track listing ==
1. "Most Events Aren't Planned"
2. "Ochimini"
3. "Where's Popeye's?"
4. "Just Kissed My Baby"
5. "Russell's Tune"
6. "Electra Glide"
7. "Sheep"
8. "Little Miami (Reputation)"
9. "CJ3"
10. "Cars Trucks Buses"
11. "Pick Up the Pieces"

=== Bonus DVD ===
1. Team Vida Blue: The Early Years
2. "Who's Laughing Now?" (recorded live in Los Angeles on June 4, 2004)

== Personnel ==
Vida Blue

- Page McConnell – vocals, keyboards
- Oteil Burbridge – bass, vocals
- Russell Batiste – drums

with Spam Allstars:

- Mercedes Abal – flute
- John Speck – trombone
- Adam Zimmon – guitar
- Lazaro Alfonso – percussion
- Tomas Diaz – percussion
- DJ Le Spam – turntables, sampler
