= Vida Blue (disambiguation) =

Vida Blue may refer to:

- Vida Blue (born 1949), an American Major League Baseball starting pitcher 1969–1983
- Vida Blue (band), an American band led by former Phish keyboardist Page McConnell, active 2001–2004, named after Vida Blue
- Vida Blue (album), the band Vida Blue's self-titled debut album
