= Music of Indiana =

The music of Indiana was strongly influenced by a large number of German and Irish immigrants who arrived in the 1830s. A prime example is "I'll Take You Home Again, Kathleen" written by Thomas Westendorf, from Hendricks County, Indiana, in 1875.

Indiana was one of the first places where jazz music became popular outside of New Orleans and Chicago. In the late 1910s and through the 1920s, the state had numerous bands of young musicians playing the new dancing style.

Richmond, Indiana was home to Gennett Records, known for recording a wealth of jazz, blues, and country music in the 1920s. Gary, Indiana was home of Vee-Jay Records, known for blues, jazz, rhythm and blues, and rock and roll in the 1950s and early 1960s.

 John Mellencamp, Michael Jackson (also of Gary's The Jackson 5), Janet Jackson, Kenneth 'Babyface' Edmonds, John Hiatt, Steve Wariner, Hoosier Hot Shots, Harry Von Tilzer, Rich Mullins, Shirley Graham Du Bois, Hazel Harrison, May Aufderheide, Cecil Duane Crabb, Julia Lee Niebergall, Kris Roe, The Four Freshmen, The Ink Spots, The Spaniels, the Bill Gaither Trio, John Michael Talbot, Albert Von Tilzer, Cole Porter ("Night and Day", d.1964, buried in Peru, IN), Hoagy Carmichael (graduate of Indiana University, buried in Bloomington), Stuart Gorrell, Carrie Newcomer, Amanda Biggs, Janie Fricke, Lonnie Mack, Tiara Thomas, Henry Lee Summer; Axl Rose, Izzy Stradlin, and DJ Ashba (all of Guns N' Roses); David Lee Roth of Van Halen, Shannon Hoon (d. 1995, buried in Lafayette) of Blind Melon, Travis Meeks of Days of the New, Kyle Cook of Matchbox Twenty, Mick Mars of Mötley Crüe, Ted Leo, Adam Lambert, and Michael Barber.

Additional musicians of various genres from Indiana include Bobby Helms ("Jingle Bell Rock" released in 1957; the artist was buried near Indianapolis), The Rivieras from South Bend ("California Sun", released in 1964, reached #5 on Billboard Hot 100), Junior Walker from South Bend ("Shotgun", released in 1965, reached #4 on Billboard Hot 100 ), Junior Brown from the Bloomington area, After 7 R&B group with Babyface's brothers ("Can't Stop"), Days of the New from Charlestown ("Touch, Peel and Stand", released in 1998, reached #1 on Mainstream Rock chart), The Ataris from Anderson ("The Boys of Summer", released in 2003, reached #2 on Alternative Songs chart), country singer Jace Everett from Evansville ("Bad Things", the theme song for True Blood, released in 2008), Houndmouth from a Louisville suburb, Umphrey's McGee from South Bend (singer Brendan Bayliss went to the University of Notre Dame), The Ready Set from Fort Wayne ("Love Like Woe", released in 2010), and Chris Wallace ("Remember When (Push Rewind)", from 2012).

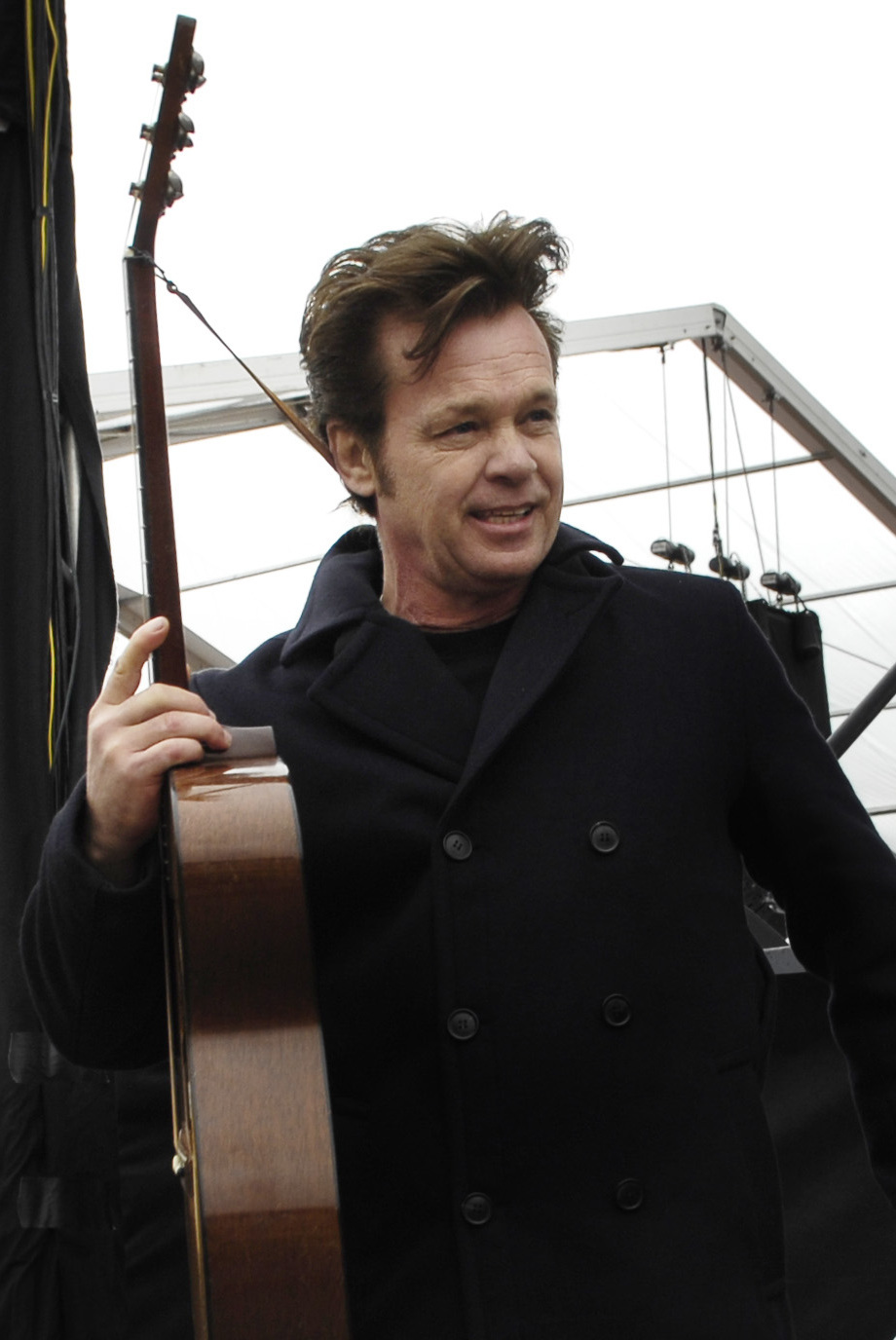
John Mellencamp

Van Halen (with David Lee Roth) had a #1 hit on the Hot 100 with "Jump", also in 1984. Guns N' Roses (with Axl Rose) had a #1 hit on the Hot 100 with "Sweet Child O' Mine." And The McCoys had a #1 Hot 100 hit in 1965 with "Hang On Sloopy." All of the above (and John Cougar Mellencamp, who had a #1 hit with "Jack & Diane" in 1982) are in the Rock and Roll Hall of Fame in Cleveland, except Deniece Williams, and The McCoys. John Mellencamp had seven #1 songs on the Mainstream Rock chart in the 1980s and early 1990s. The John Mellencamp Pavilion at Indiana University was named after him.

== Soul/R&B ==
The Jackson 5's first four singles (including "I Want You Back" from 1970) reached #1 on the Billboard Hot 100, all on Motown records. Michael Jackson (the "King of Pop", d. 2009) had 13 #1 singles (including "Billie Jean" in 1983), more than any other male artist in the Hot 100 era. He also had two #2 Hot 100 singles like "The Girl is Mine" with Paul McCartney in 1982. Jermaine Jackson gained hit "Let's Get Serious" in 1980. Janet Jackson (now in the Rock and Roll Hall of Fame) has 10 #1 singles (including "All for You") on the Hot 100. Deniece Williams, also from Gary, had two #1 Hot 100 hits, including "Let's Hear It for the Boy" in 1984.

Babyface, an R&B musician himself from Indianapolis, has written seven #1 Billboard Hot 100 hits, including "I'll Make Love to You" by Boyz II Men in 1994. A 25-mile stretch of I-65 through Indy was renamed Kenneth "Babyface" Edmonds Highway.

Though born in Oklahoma, gospel singer Sandi Patty began her musical career in Indiana at Anderson University.

== Jazz ==
Jazz artists from Indiana include J. Russel Robinson, Eddie Condon, Monk Montgomery, Wes Montgomery, Buddy Montgomery, J. J. Johnson, Freddie Hubbard, Carl Perkins, Cal Collins, Royce Campbell, Noble Sissle, Claude Thornhill, Larry Ridley, Gary Burton, Jane Jarvis, Leroy Vinnegar, Pete Candoli, Conte Candoli, Jamey Aebersold, Andy Simpkins, and David Baker.

== Punk rock ==
In Indianapolis, a vibrant 1970s punk rock and new wave scene existed. Artists involved in the scene included Latex Novelties, Joint Chiefs of Staff, and Dow Jones and the Industrials (from West Lafayette). One of the most influential Indiana punk bands was The Gizmos, from Bloomington, who spawned a thriving local alternative scene that included the likes of Amoebas in Chaos and The Dancing Cigarettes. Later, a hardcore punk and alternative rock band from Indianapolis called the Zero Boys became the single most important punk band ever to arise from the state. The Zero Boys started trying to make a local hardcore scene after seeing the Dead Kennedys in Chicago. Paul Mahern of the Zero Boys led the effort, and founded Affirmation Records, releasing several compilations and recordings from Articles of Faith (from Chicago) and local band Killing Children before going out of business. Indianapolis/Bloomington is home to post-hardcore/emo band Split Lip/Chamberlain who helped influence other emo contemporaries in the midwest such as Braid and The Get Up Kids. The Ataris formed in Anderson in the mid-90s by Anderson native Kristopher Roe.

Bloomington has a large folk punk music scene. The town is home to Chris Clavin who runs the DIY punk rock record label Plan-It-X Records and is in the band Ghost Mice. Every other year Plan-It-X Records organizes Plan-it-X Fest, a large DIY punk music festival held in Bloomington. Bloomington is also home to the record labels Secretly Canadian, Jagjaguwar, and BlueSanct. From Kokomo, another folk punk group is Harley Poe fronted by Joe Whiteford.

Lafayette is the home of Mass Giorgini's (of Squirtgun, Screeching Weasel, and Common Rider fame) Sonic Iguana Studios. Several legendary national and international punk bands have recorded or mastered their releases at Sonic Iguana, including platinum-selling acts such as Rise Against. Lafayette / West Lafayette is home to punk rock record label Oi! the boat records whose roster includes bands from around the US and Europe. In the 1980s, the Lafayette music scene featured bands such as Rattail Grenadier (later Squirtgun), Stone Soup (featuring Carrie Newcomer), East of Eden (with Newcomer's husband and guitarist Rob Meitus on guitar), and Styff Kytten (featuring Shannon Hoon later of Blind Melon. Izzy Stradlin and Axl Rose, both of whom went on to form Hollywood Rose and Guns N' Roses also emerged from the Lafayette music scene in the 1980s.

== Hip hop music ==
Notable Indiana-based independent hip hop artists include Freddie Gibbs, Mark Battles, Kid Quill, and Honcho 5ive.

== Christian musicians from Indiana ==
- Bill Gaither and Gloria Gaither - Southern Gospel - Anderson
- Ernie Haase - Southern Gospel - Cynthiana
- Gwen Stacy - Hardcore - Indianapolis
- Haste The Day - Hardcore - Indianapolis
- Jeremy Camp - Pop - Lafayette
- Jody Davis - Rock - Petersburg
- John Michael Talbot - Contemporary Christian - Indianapolis
- John Schlitt - Rock - Evansville
- Plumb (singer) (Tiffany Arbuckle Lee) - Pop - Indianapolis
- Rich Mullins - Pop - Richmond
- Sidewalk Prophets - Alternative - Anderson
- Mark Stuart - Rock - Rockport
- Mason Proffit - Southern Rock - Indianapolis
- Tricia Brock - Rock - Dillsboro

== See also ==
- "Back Home Again in Indiana"
