= Crowd Control (album) =

Studio album by MX-80 Sound
- Released: March 1981
- Studios: Celebration Studios, New York City
- Genres: Post-punk; new wave; art metal; jazz-rock
- Length: 36:25 (original); 39:58 (reissue)
- Label: Ralph
- Producer: Mark Bingham

MX-80 Sound chronology
Out of the Tunnel (1980)	Crowd Control (1981)	Existential Lover (1987)

Crowd Control is the third studio album by the American band MX-80 Sound. It was released in March 1981 through Ralph Records, their second and final for the label following Out of the Tunnel in 1980.

== Recording ==
Crowd Control was recorded at Celebration Studios in New York City, with Mark Bingham hired as producer. Bingham had previously produced MX-80 Sound's second studio album Out of the Tunnel at Mobius Music Studios in San Francisco, where the band was located. Crowd Control was their final collaboration with Bingham. Anderson expressed hope that Crowd Control would appeal to a broader audience than Out of the Tunnel or their debut album Hard Attack had managed to accrue.

All the members of MX-80 worked day jobs while recording Crowd Control. Frontman and guitarist Bruce Anderson and bassist Dale Sophiea worked at a movie theater; drummer David Mahoney worked at a commercial printer; and saxophonist–guitarist–vocalist Rich Stim worked various gigs around San Francisco. According to Anderson, the album's sound was informed by films he had seen while working as a movie theater usher. David Cronenberg's The Brood (1979) in particular had a profound impact on Anderson, prompting him to write the opening track "Face of the Earth". The album contains a cover of the theme from Sisters (1972), directed by Brian De Palma and scored by Bernard Herrmann. A cover of the theme from Halloween (1978), directed and scored by John Carpenter, was planned for the album but left out due to licensing issues. It was later included in the 1994 Atavistic compilation album Out of Control, which combines Crowd Control with Out of the Tunnel.

== Release and reception ==
Crowd Control was released in late March 1981. Following its release, MX-80 split from Ralph Records and took a "litigation-enforced" hiatus. Stim entered law school, while Anderson joined the Henry Kaiser Band. They regrouped later in the 1980s, albeit with Mahoney joined by Marc Weinstein as second drummer. In August 2016, Crowd Control was reissued on vinyl and streaming services by Ship to Shore PhonoCo., restoring "Theme from Halloween" in its original intended sequence for the album.

Professional ratings
Retrospective reviews
Review scores
Source	Rating
AllMusic	4/5 stars
Spin Alternative Record Guide	6/10 stars
The Vinyl District	A

Immediate reviews were largely positive. Ewald Braunsteiner of Sounds praised Crowd Control as "beautiful" and called it the best Ralph studio album since Tuxedomoon's Half-Mute. He wrote that with the band expanding their musical horizons, "the result is a form of legitimate, modern jazz-rock—free from the convoluted excesses that characterize other jazz-rock fusion acts". Bondo Wyszpolski of the Marina del Ray Argonaut, reviewing Crowd Control shortly after its release, called it "a noticeable increase in musical maturity" over Out of the Tunnel, "[e]specially with regard to the delivery of vocals". Wyszpolski wrote that the vocals were delivered "with greater detachment and disinterest ... Ironically, this makes the band sound more at ease with itself, and is primarily what gives [Crowd Control] a greater cutting edge". Andrew MacKenzie of the Valley Advocate wrote that Stim's "laconic monotone" made Jonathan Richman "sound like Pavarotti by contrast". He added: "And hilariously enough, it works—that zombie mumble-drone is a perfect foot-dragging foil for the relentless energy that keeps trying to push it along". Scott Bowles of the Austin American-Statesman meanwhile was unimpressed with the vocals, expressing that despite MX-80 "being one of the most exciting bands in America today", they needed "an other-worldy singer" such as Pere Ubu's David Thomas to "complete the sound".

Retrospective reviews were more mixed. Robert N. Payes, writing in the 1983 Trouser Press Record Guide, deemed it "virtually unlistenable—a messy, depressing collection of metallic dirges" and a weak follow-up to Out of the Tunnel, which he deemed the band's "high-tide mark". Writing eight years later in the 1991 edition of the Trouser Press Record Guide, Payes and David Sprague were more qualified in their criticism of the album: "With a more strict adherence to 'metal' (in the Blue Öyster Cult sense) form, the songs here merely replace much of the white-hot intensity of Tunnel with volume". Payes and Sprague singled out "Obsessive Devotion" and "Face of the Earth" for praise, calling them epiphanous, while scorning "Theme from Sisters", deeming it "nails-against-chalkboard". Jeff Salamon of the Spin Alternative Record Guide was similarly dismissive, calling it "more obviously a metal record, sludgy tempo division".

Ned Raggett of AllMusic on the other hand was highly laudatory, noting that the band tightened their songwriting while retaining the "crackling intensity and playful-while-being-serious performing" of their first two albums. Raggett highlighted "City of Fools" as Stim "at his prime" and pointed to the "brawling" title track as approaching classic "good time rock and roll". He commended the band for demonstrating "perfectly in-tune playing and inventiveness", specifically highlighting Anderson's "clipped, focused riffs and thrilling solos" on tracks like "Night Rider" and "Pharoah's Sneakers". Raggett observed that Anderson managed to "connect with the post-punk world" on "Why Are We Here" without chasing trends and found the album's "most surprising turn" to be its "newfound sense of entrancing and even uplifting songs," praising the "sweetly sad" descending chords of "More than Good", the "minimal rock noir" of "Promise of Love", and the "beautiful feedback" of "Obsessive Devotion". Joseph Neff of The Vinyl District graded the album a perfect score and called it "a treat".

In a chronicle of the shoegaze and dream pop music genres, the writer Vernon Joynson wrote that "Obsessive Devotion", with its "hazy post-punk" production, prefigured the emergence of shoegaze by several years. Likewise, The New York Times called "Promise of Love" an antecedent of Codeine's slowcore sound. Founding member Stephen Immerwahr was a huge fan of MX-80, with particular reverence for Crowd Control. "Promise of Love" was regularly featured in Codeine's live sets, and it received a cover in the 1992 EP Barely Real. ExitMusik's Jonathan Lopez noted that Codeine's cover and MX-80's original were nearly interchangeable.

== Track listing ==
=== Original 1981 LP ===
Side one
No.	Title	Writer(s)	Length
1.	"Face of the Earth"	Bruce Anderson–Rich Stim	3:43
2.	"Crowd Control"	Anderson	2:35
3.	"Why Are We Here"	Anderson–Stim	2:52
4.	"Obsessive Devotion"	Anderson–Steve Hoy	4:19
5.	"More than Good"	Anderson–Stim	3:45

Side two
No.	Title	Writer(s)	Length
6.	"Night Rider"	Anderson–Stim	4:23
7.	"City of Fools"	Anderson–Stim	2:30
8.	"Theme from Sisters"	Bernard Herrmann	2:10
9.	"Cover to Cover"	Andrea Ross–Anderson	2:43
10.	"Pharoah's Sneakers"	Anderson	4:22
11.	"Promise of Love"	Ross–Anderson	4:41
Total length:			36:25

=== 2016 reissue ===
Side one
No.	Title	Writer(s)	Length
1.	"Face of the Earth"	Anderson–Stim	3:43
2.	"Crowd Control"	Anderson	2:35
3.	"Why Are We Here"	Anderson–Stim	2:52
4.	"Obsessive Devotion"	Anderson–Hoy	4:19
5.	"More than Good"	Anderson–Stim	3:45

Side two
No.	Title	Writer(s)	Length
6.	"Theme from Halloween"	John Carpenter	3:27
7.	"Night Rider"	Anderson–Stim	4:23
8.	"City of Fools"	Anderson–Stim	2:30
9.	"Theme from Sisters"	Herrmann	2:10
10.	"Cover to Cover"	Ross–Anderson	2:43
11.	"Pharoah's Sneakers"	Anderson	4:22
12.	"Promise of Love"	Ross–Anderson	4:41
Total length:			39:58

== Personnel ==
From the original 1981 Ralph Records liner notes:

MX-80 Sound

- Bruce Anderson – guitar, backing vocals
- Dale Sophiea – bass guitar, backing vocals
- David Mahoney – drums
- Rich Stim – vocals, rhythm guitar, saxophone

Technical personnel

- Mark Bingham – production
- Mark Hood – engineering
- Mick Bingwood – special thanks
- Kim Torgerson – design and photography
- Barney Bubbles – lettering and photography
