= Love of a Lifetime =

Love of a Lifetime may refer to:

- Love of a Lifetime, a 1988 album by Edgar Meyer
- Love of a Lifetime, a 1998 album by Oteil and the Peacemakers
- "Love of a Lifetime" (FireHouse song), 1991
- "Love of a Lifetime" (Larry Gatlin song), 1988
- "Love of a Lifetime" (Honeyz song), 1999
- "Love of a Lifetime" (Chaka Khan song), 1986
- "A Love of a Lifetime", episode of the Journeyman TV series
