= The Family Secret =

The Family Secret is the title of three separate unrelated films:

- The Family Secret (1924 film), an American silent drama film directed by William A. Seiter
- The Family Secret (1936 film), a Swedish comedy film directed by Gustaf Molander
- The Family Secret (1951 film), an American crime film directed by Henry Levin
- "The Family Secret!, a 1989 episode of The Raccoons
- The Family Secret (album), a 2003 album by Oteil and the Peacemakers
