= Dancing Cigarettes =

US musical group

The Dancing Cigarettes
- Also known as: The Cigarettes, The Cigs
- Origin: Bloomington, Indiana
- Genres: Post-punk, Art rock
- Years active: 1979 – 1983
- Labels: Sirius Music, Gulcher, Turnstile Media, Magnetic South
- Members: Michael Gitlin; Emily Bonus; Tim Noe; Jaclyn Oddi; John Terrill; Don Trubey
- Website: dancingcigarettes.com

The Dancing Cigarettes were a popular post-punk and art band based in Bloomington, Indiana, active from 1979 through 1983. They were part of a cadre of Bloomington-based bands that made an impact on the underground music scene. Other bands included The Gizmos, Zero Boys, Dow Jones and the Industrials, and MX-80 Sound. These bands established Indiana as an innovative breeding ground for punk, post-punk and new wave music in the late 1970s and early 1980s.

Early on, the group changed line-ups frequently, but it typically consisted of Michael Gitlin (guitar, vocals), Emily Bonus (bass, vocals), Tim Noe (keyboards, sax, guitar), Jaclyn Oddi (keyboards, percussion), John Terrill (drums, guitar), and G. Don Trubey (sax, guitar, drums). More avant-pop than post-punk, their music was as eclectic as their members' musical talents would lead one to believe, ranging from squonky Beefheart rock to bouncy Devo-esque new wave, as evidenced by the brilliant "Pop Doormat," which opens with a deceptively anthemic synth line, then uses an ebullient bass and keyboard melody to underscore a disconsolate lyrical theme that wraps with the repeated question "What am I waiting for?"

The band played regularly at numerous venues in Bloomington, including the Bluebird, Bullwinkle's, and Second Story. The Cigs also toured extensively, appearing at clubs throughout the US, including CBGB in New York, the 9:30 Club in D.C., Mr. Goodbar in Buffalo, the Music Box in Kansas City, Tewligans in Louisville, and Space Place in Chicago. Notable gigs included sharing the stage with DNA, Tiny Desk Unit, Babylon Dance Band, Men & Volts, The Fleshtones, and author William Burroughs, plus an inspired performance at the 1982 World SubGenius Convention in Chicago.

The Cigarettes' musical style is most frequently characterized by the repeated use of hard dissonances (minor 2nd's, major 7th's) in combination with angular rhythmic patterns. At times, dissonances are densely packed, as in the thick web of atonal clusters supporting the lyrics of "Broken Windows." A more spacious use of dissonance is found in "Simple Machines," clarified by an intriguing orchestration of the band's various instrumental sounds. "Puppies in a Sack" and "Piano Lesson/Smith Street" share a similar "additive process" technique in the gradual building of their dissonant and polytonal textures. Combined with this predominantly modular organization of material is a powerful sense of linear motion frequently provided by the band's lyrics. Often the emotive verbal scenarios create tenuous implications of direction which counteract the clouds of tonal density. In "Puppies in a Sack," the relentless repetition of "It was fun for a while" evokes a resignation to nostalgia, which is arrested by the plaintive admission, "But that was a while ago!"

The group recorded frequently but released very little material (one 7-inch EP and a few appearances on "various artists" compilations) during its lifespan. Two CDs and an LP of their material have been released in the years since the band broke up.

== Discography ==
1981 - Red Snerts: The Sound of Gulcher compilation LP (Gulcher 004, reissued on CD in 2001 as Gulcher 404) Broken Windows

1981 - The Dancing Cigarettes 7-inch EP (Gulcher 007) Puppies In A Sack, Mr. Morse, Pop Doormat, Best Friend

1981 - Segments compilation cassette tape (Sirius Music 101) Burn in Heaven

1982 - T.M.I. 015: A Compilation LP (TMI 015) Jungle Book

1985 - Son of Segments compilation cassette tape (Sirius Music 103) Dance Dogs Dance

1996 - The School of Secret Music CD (Turnstile Media TM-2) Studio: Bells are Ringing, Burn in Heaven, Jungle Book, Golden Moment, Razor Hand, Heat Pump, Dance Dogs Dance, Bury Your Picture. Live Radio Recordings from KOPN Columbia, MO: Poignant, Piano Lesson/Smith Street, Burnt Toast, Nervous and Wrong, Bad Bad Boy, Up Thru the Spiral, Spanish Modern/Insect Boxing, Feel this Pain, Pop Doormat, "D" in Anger

2002 - The Gulcher Recordings: 1980-1981 CD (Gulcher 410) Studio: Puppies in a Sack, Mr. Morse, Pop Doormat, Best Friend, Broken Windows, Simple Machines, Poignant (the final two being outtakes from the EP sessions). Live at the Bluebird, June 1981: Whattayawannadonext?, Mr. Morse, Puppies in a Sack, Talking and Talking, Feel This Pain, Finger Pictures/Razor Hand, Eggs Any Style/Diet of Worms, Banana Industrial Complex, Monsters Eat My Hell, Jackie O/Too Mental For Me, Drawn By You, Burn in Heaven

2016 - Dance Dogs Dance LP (Magnetic South MS 048) Side 1: Dance Dogs Dance, I Don't Like Linoleum, Burn in Heaven, Pop Doormat, Bad Bad Boy, Finger Pictures, Razor Hand. Side 2: Bells are Ringing, Golden Moment, Poignant, Drawn by You, Little Green Thing
