= Crowd control (disambiguation) =

Crowd Control may mean:

- Crowd control, controlling large groups of people
- Crowd control (video games), handling interactions of many objects and mobs in a video game
- Crowd Control (album), a 1981 album by MX-80 Sound
- Crowd Control (2014 TV series), a 2014 reality TV show on the National Geographic Channel
- Crowd Control (2025 TV series), a 2025 stand-up comedy game show on Dropout
- "Crowd Control" (song), a 2017 song by Dimitri Vegas & Like Mike and W&W
