= Out of the Tunnel =

Studio album by MX-80 Sound
- Released: April 7, 1980
- Recorded: 1980
- Studios: Mobius Music, San Francisco, California, United States
- Length: 36:16
- Label: Ralph
- Producer: Mark Bingham

MX-80 Sound chronology
Hard Attack (1977)	Out of the Tunnel (1980)	Crowd Control (1981)

Singles from Out of the Tunnel
- 1. "Someday You'll Be King" b/w "White Night" Released: March 1980

Out of the Tunnel is the second studio album by the American band MX-80 Sound. It was released on April 7, 1980, through record label Ralph.

== Release ==
Despite never being individually issued on CD, Out of the Tunnel can be found in its entirety paired with Crowd Control on the band's Out of Control compilation album, released in 1994.

== Critical reception ==
Professional ratings
Review scores
Source	Rating
AllMusic	4.5/5 stars
The Reporter	4/5 stars
Spin Alternative Record Guide	9/10

A positive review came from Trouser Press, who regarded the album as the MX-80's high point and claimed that their "formula of convoluted, breakneck melodies, cross-fed musical genres and Anderson's white-hot soloing nears critical mass." The Rocket deemed it "music of a science fiction hell, chilling yet compelling." The Reporter opined that the album "spews acid chords which go beyond other Ralphers."

Ned Raggett of AllMusic wrote: "Poppy but not power pop, aggro-metal without indulging in the wank fantasies prone to that style, deadpan and humorous without being a put-on, MX-80 just plain shone here, with only the slightly murky mix preventing Out of the Tunnel from achieving perfection." Phoenix New Times stated that "the album is full of classic rock riffs and blistering solos, but it also features oodles of distortion, weird spoken passages, and even some sax."

== Track listing ==
All tracks are written by MX-80 Sound (Bruce Anderson, Dave Mahoney, Dale Sophiea and Rich Stim).

Side A
No.	Title	Length
1.	"It's Not My Fault"	3:27
2.	"Follow That Car"	4:16
3.	"Fender Bender"	4:17
4.	"I Walk Among Them"	3:14
5.	"Someday You'll Be King"	3:32

Side B
No.	Title	Length
1.	"Frankie I'm Sorry"	3:22
2.	"Gary and Priscilla"	4:34
3.	"Man in a Box"	4:18
4.	"Metro Teens"	5:13

== Personnel ==
MX-80 Sound

- Bruce Anderson – guitar
- Dave Mahoney – drums
- Dale Sophiea – bass guitar
- Rich Stim – vocals, guitar, saxophone

Additional musicians and technical

- Mark Bingham – production, mixing, recording
- Oliver Dicicco – mixing, recording
- Kim Torgerson – sleeve photography
