= Brad Garton =

American composer and computer musician (born 1957)

- Also known as: Mr. Science
- Born: 1957
- Occupations: Musician, songwriter, producer
- Instrument: Keyboard
- Formerly of: Dow Jones and the Industrials

Brad Garton (born 1957) is an American composer and computer musician who is professor emeritus of music at Columbia University.

He has written, or helped to write, a number of computer music applications, including Real-Time Cmix, music synthesis and signal processing language for real time composition. He received his doctorate in composition from Princeton University. Garton is director-emeritus of the Computer Music Center, Columbia University, formerly the Columbia-Princeton Electronic Music Center.

Garton grew up in Columbus, Indiana. His father, Robert, has served more than 30 years as a Republican in the Indiana state Senate, including a long term as Senate President Pro Tem. Garton majored in pharmacy as a Purdue University student, but spent much of his time on music. Billing himself as "Mr. Science", Garton provided sound effects and keyboards for the band Dow Jones and the Industrials in the late 1970s and early 1980s. He also produced many acts, making a heavy contribution to the Indiana music scene, and with Richard K. Thomas founded Zounds Studios, which continues to produce music and sound for theater. He talked about his life and his formation as a musician in an interview with Peter Shea in February 2007.
