= Crossing Lines (album) =

Studio album by Vida Blue
- Released: October 18, 2019
- Studios: Criteria Studios, Miami, Florida
- Genres: Jazz fusion, funk rock
- Labels: ATO Records; 0882374013
- Producer: Page McConnell

Vida Blue chronology
Live at the Fillmore (2004)	Crossing Lines (2019)

Crossing Lines is an album by Vida Blue, a band led by Phish keyboard player Page McConnell. It was released on October 18, 2019 by ATO Records. On the album, which followed a 15-year recording hiatus, McConnell is joined by two original Vida Blue members, bassist Oteil Burbridge and drummer Russell Batiste, along with a new addition, guitarist Adam Zimmon. The Spam Allstars also appear on two tracks.

== Reception ==
Professional ratings
Review scores
Source	Rating
AllMusic	3/5 stars

In a review for AllMusic, Timothy Monger wrote: "the musicianship and interplay between these musicians is excellent, and while Crossing Lines doesn't necessarily feel essential, it has its moments and marks a worthy third chapter in the band's canon."

Benjy Eisen, writing for Relix, called McConnell's lyrics "grown-up stuff," and stated that they "seem loaded with indecision, even paralysis, yet spoken from a place of secure identity." Regarding the album as a whole, he remarked: "Their two previous releases swung for the fences but Vida Blue hits this one out of park."

Glide Magazine's Shawn Donohue commented: "the DNA of all of these tracks screams to be explored and stretched out by live interactions on stage, however, the studio produced pristine sounds, digital flourishes and almighty groove anchors Crossing Lines; Vida Blue's blissful return."

In an article for No Depression, Anne Margaret Daniel called Zimmon "a welcome addition," and stated that, in relation to the band's previous releases, "Crossing Lines brings a fresh, spicier, pop-driven electronic sound into the hot funk and cool jazz."

Kevin Hahn of Music Marauders wrote: "Crossing Lines is a great way to bring Vida Blue and Page's solo catalog back into the forefront of the Phish world, and hopefully the jam-band landscape behind that... It is always a joy to see these 'supergroups' get back together."

== Track listing ==
"Real Underground Soul Sound" composed by Russell Batiste. Remaining tracks composed by Page McConnell.

1. "Analog Delay" – 5:57
2. "Checking Out" – 5:15
3. "Where Did It Go" – 5:50
4. "Phaidon" – 4:50
5. "Weepa" – 6:10
6. "Maybe" – 7:12
7. "Real Underground Soul Sound" – 7:57
8. "If I Told You" – 11:01

== Personnel ==
Vida Blue

- Page McConnell – keyboards, vocals
- Adam Zimmon – guitar
- Oteil Burbridge – bass
- Russell Batiste – drums

with Spam Allstars (tracks 5 and 8):

- AJ Hill – saxophone
- Ted Zimmerman – trumpet
- Chad Bernstein – trombone
- Jose Elias – guitar
- Papacho Savon – congas
- Leandro González – congas
- Tomas Diaz – timbales
- Andrew Yeomanson – turntables, sampler
