= Electric Banana (disambiguation) =

Electric Banana may refer to:

- Electric Banana, a pseudonym for the Pretty Things, a British rock music group.
- The Electric Banana, a nightclub in Pittsburgh, Pennsylvania.
- Electric Banana Band, a Swedish children's music group.
