= White Courtesy Phone =

Studio album by Angel Corpus Christi
- Released: 1995
- Genre: Alternative rock, new wave
- Label: Almo Sounds/Geffen
- Producer: Craig Leon

Angel Corpus Christi chronology
The 80's (1989)	White Courtesy Phone (1995)	Divine Healer (2003)

White Courtesy Phone is an album by the American musician Angel Corpus Christi, released in 1995. Her major label debut, it was also the first release on Jerry Moss's and Herb Alpert's Almo Sounds label.

The album's first single was "Candy".

== Production ==
The album was produced by Craig Leon. Alpert, Hal Blaine, and Dawn Richardson contributed to White Courtesy Phone.

It was the last album to be recorded in Studio A at Sausalito's Record Plant before a technology rebuild. "John Cassavetes" is about the filmmaker. A song about gun violence in American schools, "Me and My Beretta", was included only on European editions of the album.

== Critical reception ==
Professional ratings
Review scores
Source	Rating
AllMusic	3/5 stars
Daily Breeze	3/4 stars
Deseret News	2.5/4 stars
The Encyclopedia of Popular Music	4/5 stars
Knoxville News Sentinel	4/5 stars
The San Diego Union-Tribune	1.5/4 stars

Trouser Press wrote: "Surrounding her carbon-dated canned vocal presence with diverse synth-draped arrangements that manage to sound simultaneously complex and rinkydink, Angel croons the elementary melodies of supremely ingenious hook-filled songs that bounce and bop in an echo of early-’80s dance-club pogo fare by Toni Basil, Lene Lovich, Martha and the Muffins, Algebra Suicide, Hilary, etc." The Guardian noted Angel Corpus Christi's use of the accordion and her "deadpan delivery," writing that "sometimes it just sounds like half-hearted 'alternative' malarkey, but not often enough to spoil things."

The San Diego Union-Tribune opined: "Uncomfortably mating Laurie Anderson and, yes, the Angels ... White Courtesy Phone has a few nicely campy moments but precious little inspiration." The Deseret News thought that "those who dance to the doldrums of life may cherish this campy but innovative album—even though it does get monotonous after the fourth track." The Daily Breeze concluded that "Christi's accordion playing works because it fits seamlessly with the band's low-fi sound without dominating it ... Leon keeps a light touch throughout, allowing the band to walk the fine line between enjoyable campiness and tackiness merely for its own sake." The Knoxville News Sentinel praised Angel Corpus Christi's "magnetic charm" and "gratifying accordion."

== Track listing ==
No.	Title	Length
1.	"Big Black Cloud"
2.	"Threw It Away"
3.	"Homeboy"
4.	"Candy"
5.	"Nature Girl"
6.	"Dim the Lights"
7.	"Down"
8.	"John Cassavetes"
9.	"Lazy"
10.	"Fall"
11.	"Been There Done That"
12.	"Way Out West"
