= Vida Blue (band) =

American electronic music trio

- Genres: Jazz, funk, electronica
- Years active: 2001-2004, 2018-present
- Labels: Elektra Records; Sanctuary Records
- Members: Page McConnell; Oteil Burbridge; Adam Zimmon
- Past members: Russell Batiste, Jr.

Vida Blue is an electronic trio featuring Page McConnell (Phish), with Oteil Burbridge (The Allman Brothers Band, Aquarium Rescue Unit, Dead & Company), and Russell Batiste (The Meters).

== Name ==
Vida Blue got its name from the 1970s and 1980s Major League Baseball pitcher Vida Blue. Blue himself joined the band on stage in 2004 at The Fillmore in San Francisco.

A hardcore band from Iowa City, Iowa, had been using the same name from 1998 until 2001. The band subsequently changed their name to Ten Grand after they sold the rights to the band name to McConnell for $10,000.

== History ==
The band originated in 2001 when McConnell attended shows by both The Allman Brothers Band and The Meters, and approached both Burbridge and Batiste about the Vida Blue project, which they were interested in. McConnell then booked time to record in New Orleans's Piety Street Recording Studio, later adding instrumental overdubs in Vermont. The resulting self-titled album, Vida Blue, was released in the summer of 2002 on Elektra Records.

Their second album, The Illustrated Band, released in 2003 on Sanctuary Records, is backed by the Spam Allstars, a Latin Grammy-nominated, Afro-Cuban sextet.

The group actively toured in April 2002, July 2002, April 2003, January 2004, and June 2004, with their last announced appearance being at the 2004 Bonnaroo Music Festival.

A DVD: Vida Blue and the Spam Allstars - Live at the Fillmore was released on November 30, 2004.

On February 1, 2018 it was announced that the group was beginning work on a new studio album. On July 23, the new album, titled Crossing Lines, was officially announced with a release date of September 20, 2019. The band shared their first single, "Analog Delay" on all major streaming services.

Batiste died on September 30, 2023.

== Discography ==
=== Albums ===
- Vida Blue (June 25, 2002, Elektra)
- The Illustrated Band (October 14, 2003, Sanctuary)
- Crossing Lines (September 20, 2019, ATO Records)

=== DVDs ===
- Live at the Fillmore w/ the Spam Allstars (November 30, 2004)
