= Angel Corpus Christi =

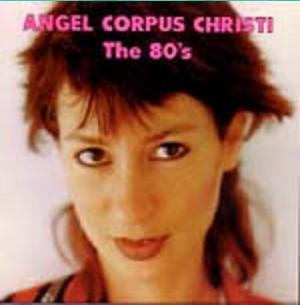
- Cover of The 80s

Background information
- Born: Andrea Ross; Flint, Michigan United States
- Genres: Indie rock, rock
- Occupations: Songwriter, musician
- Instruments: Vocals, accordion
- Years active: 1982–present
- Labels: Almo Sounds, Munster Records, Criminal Damage Records, Gulcher Records, a&r/ENT
- Website: www.angelcorpuschristi.com

Andrea Ross, better known as Angel Corpus Christi, is a San Francisco-based singer, songwriter and accordionist, who records and performs with her husband, guitarist Rich Stim (of MX-80).

== Career ==
Ross's first release was the I♥NY album, released by Criminal Damage Records in 1985. She followed this with the mini-LP Wake Up and Cry (1986) and the cassette-only Dim the Lights (1987), before returning three years later with Accordion Pop vol. 1.

In the mid-1990s, she signed to the major-backed label Almo Sounds, which issued White Courtesy Phone. It was produced by Craig Leon and features a guest appearance from Herb Alpert.

In the late 1990s she recorded with Dean Wareham (formerly of Galaxie 500 and Luna) and Alan Vega (of Suicide), and played accordion on Spiritualized's 1997 album Ladies and Gentlemen We Are Floating in Space.

Her 2003 release, Divine Healer, features former Switchblade Symphony guitarist George Earth on guitar and bass, who also played guitar and drums on her 2005 Lou Reed tribute album, Louie Louie. In 2009, Angel, working with producer Dave Nelson, deconstructed seven Elvis Presley songs for her release, Elvis Elvis. In 2012, Angel released Angel Does X-tal, a five-song EP tribute to the San Francisco band, X-tal.

As well as writing and performing her own songs she has recorded cover versions by artists such as The Ramones, Suicide, Alice Cooper, Mötley Crüe, and Lou Reed.

== Discography ==
=== Albums ===
- I♥NY (1984), Criminal Damage – reissued in 1999 by Munster
- Wake Up & Cry (1985), Criminal Damage
- Dim The Lights (1987), ENT
- Accordion Pop Volume 1 (1989), Stim
- The 80's (1989), Next Big Thing
- White Courtesy Phone (1994), Almo Sounds
- Divine Healer (2003), Gulcher Records
- Louie Louie (a tribute to Lou Reed) (2005), Gulcher Records
- Elvis Elvis (a tribute to Elvis Presley) (2009), a&r/ENT
- Angel Does X-tal (a tribute to X-tal) (2012), a&r/ENT
- Half Moon Fever (a tribute to Tom Petty) (2015), a&r/ENT
- therealangelcorpuschristi (2018), Mono-Tone – compilation

=== Singles ===
- "Pull Girl"/"Ruff Tuff Creme Puff" (1992), a&r/ENT
- "Big Black Cloud"/"Candy" (1992), a&r/ENT
- "Been There Done That" (1995), Almo Sounds
- "Me and My Beretta" (1996), 3mv/Almo Sounds
- "Je T'aime" (with Dean Wareham)/"Cheree" (with Alan Vega)/"Surfer Girl" (1997), Via Satellite
- "Je T'aime (I Wanna Boogie With You)"/"Wild Bill" (with Dean Wareham) (1998), Munster
- "You"/"I Want Everything" (with Dean Wareham) (2001), Emma's House
- "I Love Baby" (2014), Emotional Rescue
