= Kevin Teare =

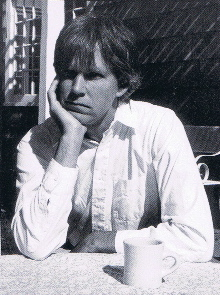
Kevin Teare

Kevin Teare (born September 13, 1951) is an American artist. He is a 2006 recipient of a Joan Mitchell Fellowship Award for painting. His first exhibition was at The Indianapolis Museum of Art in 1975. At the age of 25 he was awarded a National Endowment Fellowship for Painting. Since then he has exhibited in museums and galleries internationally. More of his works can be found at: KevinTeare.com

== Early life and education ==
Born in Indianapolis, Indiana to William and Georgia Teare, his father was an employee of International Harvester and a member of UAW Local 226 and his mother a newspaper woman who worked at The Indianapolis Star-News and The Nothside Topics.

He attended Culver Military Academy, Ball State University, Indiana University and Bard College.

== Art and Music ==
Though a visual artist first and foremost, Teare has participated in several musical projects. In 1975/76 he played drums in the seminal proto-punk band, MX-80 Sound. In New York he also played with the performance artist Julia Heyward in Glo-National in 1981. In 1991–93 he performed with Brian Kelly, Julia Murphy and Pat Place, the material that would later be titled "Brian Kelly :Each Day Blues" a CD produced by Julian Schnabel. His drumming can also be heard on Kelly's composition "She Is Dancing" for the soundtrack of the 1996 film Basquiat by Schnabel.

In 1999, Teare released "The List Of Who Lives" a collection of self penned songs featuring guest performances by Jay Dee Daugherty (Patti Smith Group), Wayne Kramer (MC5), Richard Lloyd (Television) as well as Bob Neuwirth, Terence Stamp and Jeni Muldaur. The List Of Who Lives was voted "one of the three or four best self produced albums of the millennium" by MOJO Magazine and received The A&R Album Of The Week by CMJ.

== Curating ==
In 2012 Teare curated Open For The Stones, Vol. 2 at Harper's Books in East Hampton, N.Y.. The exhibition's theme was: visual artists who have had a significant relationship to music. The exhibition included works by Larry Clark, Angel Corpus Christi, Don Christensen, Bethany Fancher, Daniel Johnston, Liz Markus, Gillian McCain, Ron Nagle, Lou Reed, Stuart Sutcliffe and others. Open For The Stones, Vol.1, the first in a series of group exhibitions opened in New York at Julie Keyes Art Projects in 2011. Participating artists included Tara Israel, Bob Neuwirth, Pat Place and Chris Snow.

In 1992 Kevin Teare curated the critically acclaimed exhibition "JFK: Myth & Denial" for The Fotouhi Gallery in East Hampton. The show included selections by such artists as Larry Clark, Kiki Smith, Sue Williams, Leon Golub, Mary Heilman, Jim Marrs, Allen Frame, Steven Kroninger and Tom Otterness.

The earliest work Teare is known for are the mortar and lattice paintings from 1975 to 1980. [The "lattice" paintings were FIRST shown at the now-defunct Belmont Gallery on South Washington St., in Bloomington, Indiana, circa 1974–75 and then at the Monroe County Library in Bloomington, Indiana, before being shown in Indianapolis and New York.] These were shown at The Indianapolis Museum of Art and at 55 Mercer Gallery in New York at the behest of the sculptor Julius Tobias. In 2007 they were exhibited at The Islip Museum of Art for the "Surface Impression" show curated by Karen Shaw. Starting in the early 80's his work took a decidedly more political turn calling on his use of military and world history and utilizing symbols, flow charts and cartography as part of the painted compositions. The earliest of these works were shown in 1982 at P.S.1 in an exhibition curated by Marcia Tucker called: "Critical Perspectives".

== Teaching and personal life ==
Teare started teaching painting in 1999 at Lacoste School of Art in Provence, France. Since then he has taught drawing, painting and Art History at Southampton College, Dowling College and Suffolk Community College. He lives and works in Sag Harbor, New York with his wife, the artist Mary Boochever.

Quotes:

"I came here with goals and for the first of those years I was sidetracked. I had to find out what this wasn't."
"I've always used art to make sense of everything."

== Collections ==
Fort Wayne Museum of Art; Goldman Sachs, N.Y.C.; McDonald's Corp. Chicago; Morgan Guaranty, N.Y.C.; Marcia Tucker; Reed Smith Shaw & McClay Phila.
