= Dead & Company Summer Tour 2019 =

2019 concert tour by Dead & Company

Summer Tour 2019
- Tour by Dead & Company
- Location: United States
- Start date: May 31, 2019
- End date: July 6, 2019
- Legs: 1
- No. of shows: 19

Dead & Company concert chronology
- Dead & Company Summer Tour 2018; Dead & Company Summer Tour 2019; Dead & Company Fall Fun Run 2019

Dead & Company Summer Tour 2019 was a concert tour by the rock band Dead & Company. It was the follow-up to the band's Dead & Company Summer Tour 2018. The tour comprised 19 dates across 14 locations from May 31 to July 6, 2019.

== Tour dates ==
Date	City	Venue	Attendance	Revenue
May 31, 2019	Mountain View	Shoreline Amphitheatre	38,971 / 44,262	$2,871,183
June 1, 2019	Mountain View	Shoreline Amphitheatre	38,971 / 44,262	$2,871,183
June 3, 2019	Los Angeles	Hollywood Bowl	33,713 / 34,857	$3,284,217
June 4, 2019	Los Angeles	Hollywood Bowl	33,713 / 34,857	$3,284,217
June 7, 2019	George	The Gorge Amphitheatre	36,956 / 43,893	$2,866,616
June 8, 2019	George	The Gorge Amphitheatre	36,956 / 43,893	$2,866,616
June 12, 2019	Noblesville	Ruoff Home Mortgage Music Center	17,751 / 24,462	$1,376,803
June 14, 2019	Chicago	Wrigley Field	72,851 / 83,234	$7,055,528
June 15, 2019	Chicago	Wrigley Field	72,851 / 83,234	$7,055,528
June 18, 2019	Saratoga Springs	Saratoga Performing Arts Center	20,323 / 25,082	$1,470,588
June 20, 2019	Camden	BB&T Pavilion	24,010 / 25,349	$1,793,730
June 22, 2019	Foxborough	Gillette Stadium	40,509 / 43,779	$3,281,808
June 23, 2019	New York City	Citi Field	39,726 / 39,726	$4,042,235
June 26, 2019	Bristow	Jiffy Lube Live	17,182 / 23,194	$1,425,802
June 28, 2019	Charlotte	PNC Music Pavilion	18,993 / 19,474	$1,599,995
June 29, 2019	Atlanta	Cellairis Amphitheatre	18,943 / 18,943	$1,436,397
July 2, 2019	Dallas	Dos Equis Pavilion	13,127 / 20,006	$1,214,688
July 5, 2019	Boulder	Folsom Field	67,835 / 86,982	$6,512,990
July 6, 2019	Boulder	Folsom Field	67,835 / 86,982	$6,512,990
Total			460,890 / 533,193 (86.4%)	$40,232,580

== Musicians ==
- Bob Weir – guitar, vocals
- Mickey Hart – drums
- Bill Kreutzmann – drums
- John Mayer – guitar, vocals
- Oteil Burbridge – bass, percussion, vocals
- Jeff Chimenti – keyboards, vocals

== See also ==
- Reunions of the Grateful Dead
