= The Electric Banana =

Nightclub in Pittsburgh, Pennsylvania

Coordinates: 40.4548°N 79.9542°W

- Location within Pittsburgh
- Location: Pittsburgh, Pennsylvania, U.S.
- Owner: Johnny "Banana" Zarra
- Type: Nightclub
- Event: Punk rock

Construction
- Opened: 1980
- Closed: 2000

The Electric Banana was a nightclub in Pittsburgh, Pennsylvania. Beginning as a disco in the 1970s, it was a punk rock and alternative music venue from 1980 until 2000, and helped establish a place in alternative culture for the city of Pittsburgh.

The venue hosted such acts as Black Flag, Circle Jerks, The Misfits, Hüsker Dü, Sonny Vincent and the Extreme, Dead Milkmen, Meat Puppets, Descendents, Rhythm Pigs, Snakefinger, Wreckless Eric, Ian Dury, Sepultura, Candlemass, Morbid Angel, New Model Army, They Might Be Giants, Minutemen, The Dancing Cigarettes, and others.

Located at 3887 Bigelow Boulevard, it was transformed by owner Johnny "Banana" Zarra into an Italian restaurant called "Zarra's: A Taste Of Southern Italy."

== History ==
The Electric Banana became a punk rock club in early 1980, after stints as both a go-go bar and as a gay go-go bar. Zarra and wife Judy, a former go-go dancer, took up an offer from local punk and other "unique" bands and artists who needed a venue to play. Within a couple of years, The Banana became the epicenter of Pittsburgh's punk rock scene. By 1982, most of the name bands of the national underground punk scene played at the club.

== Cultural impact ==
A mention is made to the Electric Banana in the song "Pittsburgh" by They Might Be Giants on their 2004 Venue Songs Album. The song concentrates on Mr. Smalls theater in Millvale, Pennsylvania, but The Banana is mentioned in the lines:

I still have dreams about a place / called the Electric Banana / where we're falling into space

The Electric Banana was also known for its stylized yellow matchbook covers. The image of a banana may have been copied from Andy Warhol's icon used for the Velvet Underground.
