= The Illustrated Band =

Studio album by Vida Blue
- Released: October 14, 2003 (US)
- Genre: Music
- Length: 61:32
- Label: Elektra
- Producer: Page McConnell

Vida Blue chronology
Vida Blue (2002)	The Illustrated Band (2003)	Live at the Fillmore (2004)

The Illustrated Band is the second album from Vida Blue, featuring Phish keyboardist Page McConnell along with bassist Oteil Burbridge and drummer Russell Batiste.

The album features four long tracks performed alongside The Spam Allstars, a Grammy-winning Afro-Cuban group that also toured as a part of the Vida Blue band in the summer of 2003 and the early winter of 2004. Shortly after the tour, Page McConnell briefly retired from the music business following the breakup of Phish, therefore ending all Vida Blue related activities indefinitely.

The album title is a reference to Ray Bradbury's science fiction book The Illustrated Man.

== Reception ==
Professional ratings
Review scores
Source	Rating
AllMusic	2.5/5 stars
Rolling Stone	3/5 stars

In a review for AllMusic, David Jeffries wrote that the album "makes for a funky good-time listen" but cautioned that "it's not the big payoff one would have hoped." However, he noted: "With so much funk, Latin jazz, and scratching being executed so well and with plenty of heart, it's hard not to like the album."

Writing for Rolling Stone, Greg Heller called the album a "surprisingly satisfying and super-charged chunk of mo' ritmo funk," and described the four tracks as "a living breathing fusion of astral jazz and Latin beats, none remotely bound to structure." He concluded: "There is plenty here on offer for purist and jam-fiend alike."

John Anderson of the Miami New Times described the album as "The Spam Allstars jam[ming] with an amazing rhythm section behind them... it's a lot of fun and a natural collaboration."

In an article for Jambands.com, Benjy Eisen called The Illustrated Band "an entertaining album," and remarked: "it is radically different from anything McConnell, Burbridge, or Batiste have ever released in their respective careers. And it's pretty darn cool for that accomplishment alone."

== Track listing ==
1. "The Illustrated Band" - 12:22
2. "Charmpit" - 24:01
3. "You Don't Know" - 4:21
4. "Little Miami (Reputation)" - 20:48

== Personnel ==
Vida Blue

- Page McConnell – vocals, keyboards
- Oteil Burbridge – bass, vocals
- Russell Batiste – drums

with Spam Allstars:

- Mercedes Abal – flute, vocals
- AJ Hill – saxophone
- John Speck – trombone
- Lazaro Alfonso – percussion, vocals
- Tomas Diaz – percussion, vocals
- DJ Le Spam – turntables, sampler
