= Hard Attack (MX-80 album) =

Studio album by MX-80
- Released: 1977
- Genres: Art metal, punk
- Label: Island
- Producer: Mark Bingham

MX-80 chronology
Hard Attack (1977)	Out of the Tunnel (1980)

Hard Attack is the debut album by MX-80 Sound, released in 1977 by Island Records. It was re-released by Atavistic Records in 1995, combined with the 1976 EP Big Hits.

== Reception ==
Professional ratings
Review scores
Source	Rating
AllMusic	4/5 stars
Spin Alternative Record Guide	4/10

According to Trouser Press, the album was well received by the critics who reviewed it when it was released. AllMusic writes that the album "[finds] the band balanced in some sort of weird zone where punk, art metal, and a drawling sort of humor could all happily coexist."

== Track listing ==
All tracks are written by MX-80 Sound (Bruce Anderson, Dave Mahoney, Dale Sophiea and Rich Stim).

Side A
No.	Title	Length
1.	"Man on the Move"	3:55
2.	"Kid Stuff"	2:56
3.	"Fascination"	1:43
4.	"Summer '77"	3:03
5.	"PCB's"	1:57
6.	"Crushed Ice"	3:10

Side B
No.	Title	Length
1.	"Tidal Wave"	3:13
2.	"Checkmate"	1:46
3.	"Facts-Facts"	3:11
4.	"You're Not Alone"	3:39
5.	"Civilized / Demeyes"	5:17
6.	"Afterbirth / Aftermath"	4:27

== Personnel ==
MX-80 Sound

- Bruce Anderson – guitar, backing vocals
- Dale Sophiea – bass, backing vocals
- Rich Stim – vocals, saxophone, organ, rhythm guitar

Additional musicians and technical

- Mark Bingham – production, backing vocals
- Mark Hood – engineering
- Kim Torgerson – sleeve photography
