= Spam Allstars =

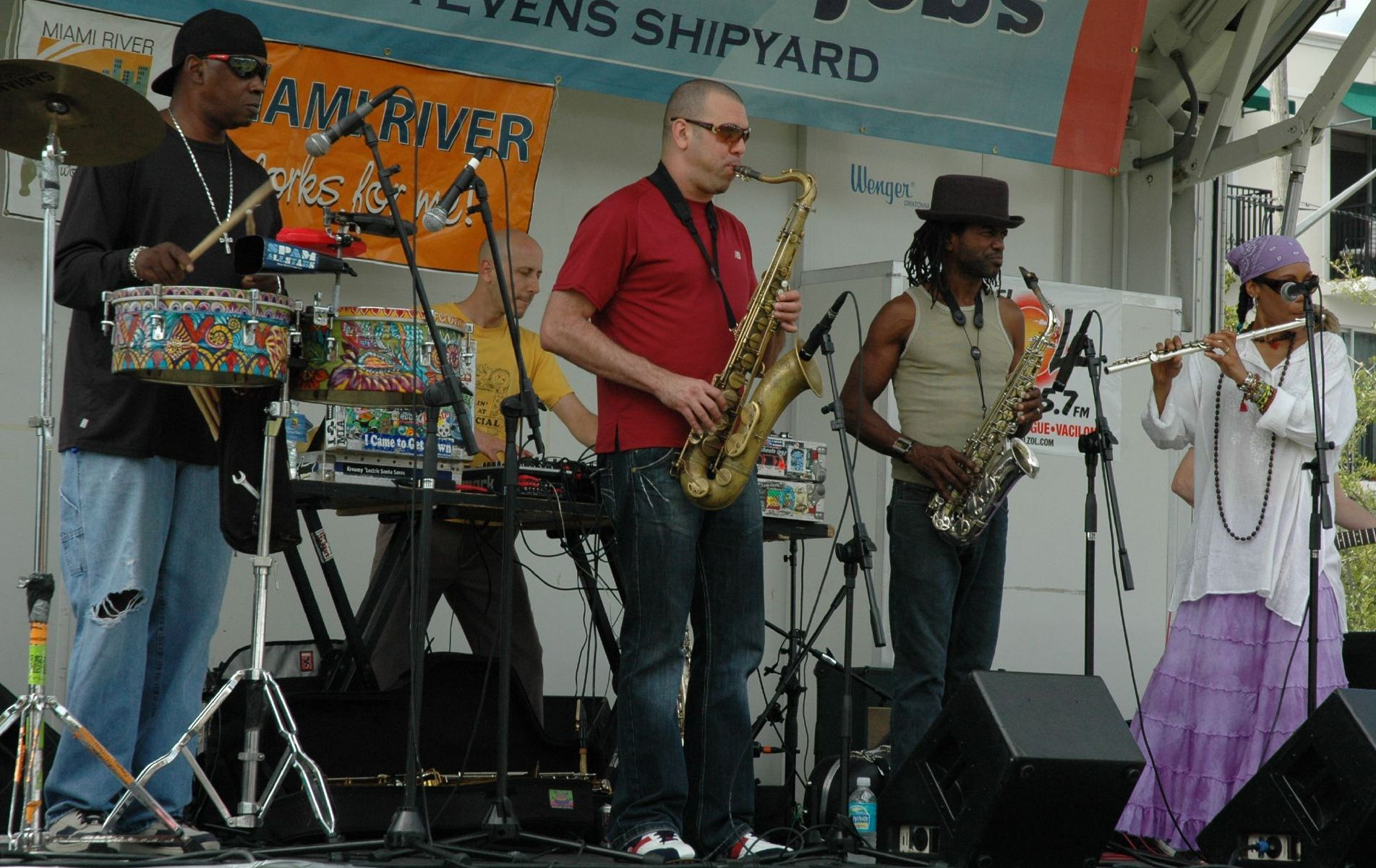
- Performing at the Miami River Festival in 2007

Background information
- Origin: Miami, Florida, USA
- Genres: Afro-Cuban, Hip hop, Latin, funk, electro, dub
- Years active: 1993–Present
- Label: Spamusica Records
- Members: DJ Le Spam; Tomas Diaz; AJ Hill; Chad Bernstein; Jose Elias; Magela Herrera
- Past members: Adam Zimmon; Ted Zimmerman; Mercedes Abal; Steve Welsh; John Speck; Nicole Martinez
- Website: www.spamallstars.com

Spam Allstars are a United States 6-piece Latin, funk, and electronica band from Miami, Florida. The band has been described as creators of the new Miami Sound. They had a legendary 15 year weekly residency in Little Havana at a small club called Hoy Como Ayer. They toured averaging 250 shows a year for a decade. They have recorded 6 albums independently on their Spamusica Records label. The band has performed at many music festivals including Roskilde, High Sierra, Langerado, Gasparilla Music Festival, Wakarusa, Montreal Jazz Festival, Harbourfront Centre, Santa Monica Pier, Grassroots, and Summerstage. Spam Allstars also recorded an album, The Illustrated Band, with Page McConnell side project Vida Blue, in addition to being featured on Vida Blue's DVD Live at the Fillmore.

== Discography ==
- 1999: Pork Scratchings
- 2000: Pigs in Space
- 2002: Fuacata Live!
- 2004: Spam Allstars Contra Los Roboticos Mutantes
- 2007: electrodomésticos
