= Live at the Beacon Theatre (Allman Brothers Band video) =

Video by the Allman Brothers Band
- Released: September 23, 2003
- Recorded: March 25–26, 2003
- Genre: Southern rock, blues rock
- Length: 3:00:00
- Label: Sanctuary
- Director: Michael Drumm

The Allman Brothers Band chronology
Hittin' the Note (2003)	Live at the Beacon Theatre (2003)	Live at the Atlanta International Pop Festival: July 3 & 5, 1970 (2003)

Professional ratings
Review scores
Source	Rating
Allmusic	4/5 stars

Live at the Beacon Theatre is a live concert DVD by the rock group the Allman Brothers Band. It was filmed at the Beacon Theatre, New York City on March 25 and 26, 2003 and released September 23, 2003. The DVD is certified Platinum in the United States by the RIAA.

== Track listing ==
=== Disc 1 ===
1. "Ain't Wastin' Time No More" (Gregg Allman)
2. "Black Hearted Woman" (Gregg Allman)
3. "Statesboro Blues" (Blind Willie McTell)
4. "Woman Across the River" (Betteye Crutcher, Allen Jones)
5. "A Change Is Gonna Come" (Sam Cooke)
6. "Maydell" (Warren Haynes, Johnny Neel)
7. "Come and Go Blues" (Gregg Allman)
8. "Rockin' Horse" (Gregg Allman, Warren Haynes, Allen Woody, Jack Pearson)
9. "Desdemona" (Gregg Allman, Warren Haynes)
10. "Don't Keep Me Wonderin'" (Gregg Allman)
11. "Midnight Rider" (Gregg Allman, Robert Payne)
12. "Soulshine" (Warren Haynes)
13. "High Cost of Low Living" (Gregg Allman, Warren Haynes, Jeff Anders, Ronnie Burgin)
14. "Leave My Blues at Home" (Gregg Allman)
15. "Old Before My Time" (Gregg Allman, Warren Haynes)
16. "The Same Thing" (Willie Dixon)
17. "Melissa" (Gregg Allman, Steve Alaimo)
18. "Instrumental Illness" (Warren Haynes, Oteil Burbridge)
19. "Worried Down with the Blues" (Warren Haynes, John Jaworowicz)
20. "Dreams" (Gregg Allman)
21. "Whipping Post" (Gregg Allman)

=== Disc 2 (Bonus Disc) ===
1. "One Way Out" (Elmore James, Marshall Sehorn, Sonny Boy Williamson II)
2. "Old Friend" – Warren Haynes and Derek Trucks dressing room rehearsal (Warren Haynes, Chris Anderson)
3. Bonus features: Interviews, photo gallery, and behind the scenes footage

== Personnel ==
The Allman Brothers Band

- Gregg Allman – Hammond B-3 organ, piano, acoustic guitar, lead vocals
- Jaimoe – drums
- Butch Trucks – drums
- Warren Haynes – lead and slide guitar, lead and background vocals
- Marc Quiñones – congas, percussion, background vocals
- Oteil Burbridge – bass
- Derek Trucks – lead and slide guitar

Additional musicians

Horns on "A Change Is Gonna Come" and "The Same Thing":

- Jay Collins – tenor saxophone
- Chris Karlic – baritone saxophone
- Richard Boulger – trumpet

Production

- Michael Drumm – director
- Alicia Gelernt – producer
- Chris Prinzivalli – audio engineer
- Tim Fenoglio – camera operator
- J.M. Hurley – video engineer
- Tore Livia – jib operator
- Tim Fenoglio – title designer
- Josh Chasin -–liner notes

== Charts and certifications ==
Chart	Provider(s)	Peak position	Sales	Certification
US Billboard Top Video	RIAA	14	100,000	Platinum

Organization	Sales	Level	Date
RIAA - USA	50,000	Gold	October 24, 2003
RIAA - USA	100,000	Platinum	April 8, 2004
