= Believer (Oteil and the Peacemakers album) =

Studio album by Oteil and the Peacemakers
- Released: 2005
- Genre: Jazz fusion
- Length: 1:03:10
- Labels: Rattlesby Records; RLB1010

Oteil and the Peacemakers chronology
The Family Secret (2003)	Believer (2005)

Believer is the third album by Oteil and the Peacemakers, a band led by bassist Oteil Burbridge. It was released on CD in 2005 by Rattlesby Records. On the album, Burbridge is joined by Mark Kimbrell on guitar, Matt Slocum on keyboards, Paul Henson on vocals, and Chris Fryar on drums.

When asked to describe the Peacemakers' music, Burbridge used the word "fujospel" (funk, jazz and gospel). He commented: "To me it's just all different kinds of American Music thrown together. And I can't even say that cause a lot of rhythmic stuff that I hear comes from Africa, Cuba and a lot of the harmonic stuff comes from Europe, from classical composers like Stravinsky."

== Reception ==
Professional ratings
Review scores
Source	Rating
AllMusic	3.5/5 stars

In a review for AllMusic, Scott Yanow wrote: "the music of Oteil & the Peacemakers is certainly impossible to classify. Is it jazz, blues, fusion, rock, pop, R&B, or a jam band? Actually, it is all of the above... this set will drive musical purists crazy but should delight those who enjoy all of these different styles of music being played in a very different way."

Emily Beard of Paste called the album a "solid, eclectic record," and commented: "Burbridge has called his solo work with Oteil and the Peacemakers 'jazzy Jesus funk,' pulling influence from Southern jazz, blues, funk and gospel. Their latest release Believer justifies the epithet."

Glide Magazine's Joe Adler wrote that Burbridge "takes a confident stand" on the album, and "wastes absolutely no time getting deep into the funk."

In an article for Jambands.com, John Patrick Gatta noted that the album "reflects [Burbridge's] spiritual side," and suggested that the lyrics "are meant to offer insight to Burbridge's positive nature and, hopefully, spread that feeling to others."

== Track listing ==
1. "Hit The Hay" (Oteil Burbridge / Paul Henson) – 7:17
2. "Blue Eyed Savior" (Oteil Burbridge) – 8:12
3. "No More Doubt" (Paul Henson) – 7:20
4. "Tubby" (Oteil Burbridge / Paul Henson / Matt Slocum) – 7:01
5. "Silverback" (Paul Henson) – 3:50
6. "Rooster" (Oteil Burbridge / Paul Henson) – 5:25
7. "Sweet Lord" (Oteil Burbridge) – 6:53
8. "Church Groove" (Oteil Burbridge / Paul Henson / Matt Slocum) – 2:18
9. "Happy Dance" (The Peacemakers) – 4:23
10. "Pull Together" (Paul Henson) – 5:11
11. "Doxology" (Louis Bourgeois / Thomas Ken) – 5:20

== Personnel ==
- Oteil Burbridge – bass, vocals
- Mark Kimbrell – guitar
- Matt Slocum – keyboards
- Paul Henson – vocals
- Chris Fryar – drums
