= Dead & Company Summer Tour 2018 =

2018 concert tour by Dead & Company

- Tour by Dead & Company
- Location: United States
- Start date: May 30, 2018
- End date: August 26, 2018
- Legs: 1
- No. of shows: 26

Dead & Company concert chronology
- Dead & Company Fall Tour 2017; Dead & Company Summer Tour 2018; Dead & Company Summer Tour 2019

The Dead & Company Summer Tour 2018 is a concert tour by the rock band Dead & Company during May, June, and July 2018. It is the band’s fifth tour, following their 2017 Fall Tour (which overflowed into 2018 after several shows were postponed when John Mayer had an emergency appendectomy). The tour comprises a total of 24 concerts in 19 different cities between May 30 and July 14, 2018.

Prior to the 2018 Summer Tour, in addition to the three rescheduled dates from the 2017 Fall tour, the band performed three shows — February 15, 17 and 18 — at the Barceló Maya resort in Riviera Maya, Mexico. The event, billed as a "concert vacation", was called Playing In The Sand (a pun on the Grateful Dead song "Playing in the Band"). They wrapped up the summer tour with a two-night stop at the Lockn' Festival.

The band Dead & Company includes three former members of the Grateful Dead – Bob Weir, Bill Kreutzmann, and Mickey Hart – along with Mayer, Jeff Chimenti, and Oteil Burbridge.

== Tour dates ==
The tour consists of total of 26 concerts in 20 different U.S. cities.

Summer Tour 2018
Date	City	Venue	Attendance	Revenue
May 30, 2018	Mansfield	Xfinity Center	16,678 / 19,301	$1,389,716
June 1, 2018	Camden	BB&T Pavilion	35,485 / 50,089	$2,495,742
June 2, 2018	Camden	BB&T Pavilion	35,485 / 50,089	$2,495,742
June 4, 2018	Cincinnati	Riverbend Music Center	15,351 / 19,836	$918,860
June 6, 2018	Noblesville	Ruoff Home Mortgage Music Center	14,927 / 23,967	$885,578
June 8, 2018	Atlanta	Cellairis Amphitheatre at Lakewood	15,671 / 18,519	$1,162,358
June 9, 2018	Raleigh	Coastal Credit Union Music Park	19,444 / 19,444	$1,053,430
June 11, 2018	Saratoga Springs	Saratoga Performing Arts Center	17,877 / 25,131	$1,160,839
June 13, 2018	Hartford	Xfinity Theatre	14,594 / 24,511	$979,640
June 15, 2018	New York City	Citi Field	59,600 / 76,886	$5,170,084
June 16, 2018	New York City	Citi Field	59,600 / 76,886	$5,170,084
June 19, 2018	Darien	Darien Lake Performing Arts Center	15,352 / 21,722	$991,666
June 20, 2018	Cuyahoga Falls	Blossom Music Center	17,116 / 20,147	$1,168,936
June 22, 2018	East Troy	Alpine Valley Music Theatre	50,131 / 71,030	$2,829,045
June 23, 2018	East Troy	Alpine Valley Music Theatre	50,131 / 71,030	$2,829,045
June 29, 2018	George	The Gorge Amphitheatre	18,226 / 21,915	$1,226,242
June 30, 2018	Eugene	Autzen Stadium	36,436 / 36,436	$1,921,089
July 2, 2018	Mountain View	Shoreline Amphitheatre	39,256 / 44,022	$2,253,643
July 3, 2018	Mountain View	Shoreline Amphitheatre	39,256 / 44,022	$2,253,643
July 6, 2018	Chula Vista	Mattress Firm Amphitheatre	15,543 / 19,602	$1,093,450
July 7, 2018	Los Angeles	Dodger Stadium	33,098 / 39,021	$2,464,706
July 11, 2018	Albuquerque	Isleta Amphitheater	10,630 / 15,315	$645,673
July 13, 2018	Boulder	Folsom Field	62,904 / 86,982	$5,369,669
July 14, 2018	Boulder	Folsom Field	62,904 / 86,982	$5,369,669
August 25, 2018	Arrington	Lockn' Festival		
August 26, 2018	Arrington	Lockn' Festival		

== Musicians ==
- Mickey Hart – drums, percussion
- Bill Kreutzmann – drums
- John Mayer – lead guitar, lead/backing vocals
- Bob Weir – rhythm guitar, lead/backing vocals
- Oteil Burbridge – bass guitar, percussion, lead/backing vocals
- Jeff Chimenti – keyboards, backing & occasional lead vocals

== See also ==
- Reunions of the Grateful Dead
