= Tone Set =

American electronic music duo

- Also known as: The Art Farmers; Life Is Busy; Happy People; The Special Eds
- Origin: Tempe, Arizona, U.S.
- Genres: Synth-pop, new wave, synthpunk
- Years active: 1981–1983
- Labels: Vinyl on Demand, Pegna Records, Zia Records
- Past members: Galen Herod; Greg Horn

Tone Set was an American synth-pop duo from Tempe, Arizona formed by musicians Galen Herod and Greg Horn in 1981. Horn had previously played in the Indiana punk band Dow Jones and the Industrials The two met working at the local TV station KAET. Their early sound was very minimalist in style, as evident by their instrumental 1982 debut Cal's Ranch. Later on, their music became increasingly pop-oriented, as shown by their follow-up Calibrate, which was self-released in February 1983 through their own Pegna Records imprint.

Although the band received local radio airplay, as well as having the music video for the track "Life Is Busy" played on MTV and Cinemax, the band met little to no fanfare. Tone Set would eventually cease to exist later in 1983, with both members going on to work on other projects. Galen Herod began a solo career and started the band Galen Herod and the Skin People. The duo would eventually work together again in the band Dumb But Happy, but they too broke up.

During their existence, Tone Set performed shows under names such as Life Is Busy, The Art Farmers, and The Special Eds. They also contributed the track "Out! Out!" to the Placebo Records compilation Amuck under the name Happy People. The group utilized synthesizers and electronic drum kits for their music, and audio samples taken from films and radio ads were used frequently as well.

Retrospectives have named Tone Set as one the 100 greatest rock bands in the Valley and "Out, Out!" as one of the top 100 songs that define Arizona. In 2016, Vinyl on Demand issued a four-disc discography vinyl boxset titled Such Heavy Conviction: Recordings 1981–1983 that included most recordings made by the duo, including unreleased material.

== Discography ==
- Cal's Ranch (1982, Zia Records)
- Calibrate (1983, Pegna Records)
- Such Heavy Conviction: Recordings 1981–1983 (2016, Vinyl on Demand)
