= Page McConnell (album) =

Studio album by Page McConnell
- Released: April 17, 2007
- Genre: Rock
- Label: Sony Music
- Producer: Bryce Goggin; Jared Slomoff

Page McConnell chronology
Page McConnell (2007)	Unsung Cities and Movies Never Made (2013)

Page McConnell is the debut album from Phish keyboardist Page McConnell. It was recorded over a two-year period following the break-up of Phish. The album was produced by Bryce Goggin and Jared Slomoff. It was released on April 17, 2007. The three other members of Phish, Trey Anastasio, Jon Fishman and Mike Gordon, all perform on the album, but the entire band does not appear together on any of the tracks.

== Track listing ==
All tracks written by Page McConnell.

1. "Beauty of a Broken Heart" - 3:41
2. "Heavy Rotation" - 10:44
3. "Maid Marian" - 5:10
4. "Close to Home" - 4:21
5. "Runaway Bride" - 3:57
6. "Back in the Basement" - 8:27
7. "Rules I Don't Know" - 6:04
8. "Complex Wind" - 5:04
9. "Everyone But Me" - 5:06

== Personnel ==
=== Musical ===
- Page McConnell - Organ, Synthesizer, Bass, Piano, Accordion, Vocals, Clavinet, Producer, Drum Programming, Synthesizer Bass, Wurlitzer, Toy Piano
- Trey Anastasio - Guitar
- Jon Fishman - Drums
- Mike Gordon - Bass
- Jeff Hill - Bass
- Jim Keltner - Drums
- Jared Slomoff - Guitar (Acoustic), Bass, Trumpet, Guitar (Electric), Vocals, Vocals (background), Producer, Engineer
- Adam Zimmon - Guitar

=== Technical ===
- Bryce Goggin - Producer, Engineer, Mixing
- Michelle Holme - Art Direction, Design
- Fred Kevorkian - Mastering
- Shane McCauley - Photography
- Rob O' Dea - Studio Assistant
- Adam Sachs - Studio Assistant
- Kevin Shapiro - Studio Assistant
- Kazu Shibashi - Studio Assistant
