= The Family Secret (album) =

Studio album by Oteil and the Peacemakers
- Released: 2003
- Recorded: November 9–17, 2001
- Studios: Dockside Studios, Maurice, Louisiana
- Genre: Jazz fusion
- Length: 63:20
- Labels: Artists House, AH00002
- Producer: John Snyder

Oteil and the Peacemakers chronology
Love of a Lifetime (1998)	The Family Secret (2003)	Believer (2005)

The Family Secret is the second album by Oteil and the Peacemakers, a band led by bassist Oteil Burbridge. It was released on CD in 2003 by Artists House. On the album, Burbridge is joined by Mark Kimbrell on guitar, Jason Crosby on keyboards and violin, Kebbi Williams on saxophone, Paul Henson on vocals, and Chris Fryar on drums. The disc is accompanied by a DVD that features a video of the recording session, a lesson with Burbridge, interviews, lead sheets, and more.

Concerning the album title, Burbridge commented: "I am committed to taking the power away from words that have been hurtful. The family secret is in the first five minutes of Blazing Saddles."

== Reception ==
Professional ratings
Review scores
Source	Rating
AllMusic	3/5 stars
Jambands: The Complete Guide to the Players, Music, & Scene	3.5/5 stars

In a review for AllMusic, Jesse Jarnow called the album "an improv-laced disc of nuanced fusion and jam band funk," and wrote: "the music itself is comparatively low key. If only it were more original."

Writer Dean Budnick stated: "The results are more varied than the Peacemakers' debut, and the group certainly kicks it a bit more."

Phil DiPietro of All About Jazz noted that Burbridge's "abilities and acumen as a jazz player and improviser are right there with the greatest, especially when taking the jazzy vamp into absolutely uncharted harmonic and chops-laden territory." He commented: "One of the greatest electric bassists of all time, Oteil Burbridge has finally made the recording that does his music most justice... It... should go a long way toward propelling him and the Peacemakers to well-deserved increased notoriety on the worldwide stage."

In an article for Jambands.com, John Patrick Gatta wrote that the album is marked by "an atmosphere of some late night music with the lights turned down low, beer in hand," and remarked: "It's as much about chilling out... as it is about jazz fusion and jamband in its sharp exploration of the melodies... the intent is clear — crisp interplay rules each track with the weaving of bass / guitar / drums / violin / keyboards."

== Track listing ==
"America the Beautiful" by Katharine Lee Bates and Samuel A. Ward. Remaining tracks by Oteil Burbridge.

1. "Too Many Times" – 5:47
2. "Get Ready" – 5:22
3. "Honk If You" – 4:09
4. "Full Circle" – 9:31
5. "Time Won't Tell" – 4:51
6. "Hard to Find" – 5:11
7. "Rewind and Play It Again" – 7:07
8. "My Dog Sassy" – 8:23
9. "Thank You" – 6:19
10. "Check Yourself" – 4:36
11. "America the Beautiful" – 2:04

== Personnel ==
- Oteil Burbridge – bass
- Mark Kimbrell – guitar
- Jason Crosby – keyboards, violin
- Kebbi Williams – tenor saxophone
- Paul Henson – vocals
- Chris Fryar – drums
