= Piety Street Recording =

Recording studio in New Orleans, Louisiana

Coordinates: 29.9637°N 90.0427°W

Piety Street Recording as seen from the northeast corner of Piety and Dauphine streets.

Piety Street Recording was a recording studio at 728 Piety Street in the 9th Ward/Bywater, New Orleans.

== History ==
The building was originally a US post office and later housed the Louisiana Center For Retarded Citizens. After a few short-term tenants, the building was purchased in 1999 by producer/engineer/musician Mark Bingham and ex-REM manager Jefferson Holt. In 2001 it was rebuilt as a 3-studio recording facility and christened Piety Street Recording. Other partners included artist and studio manager Shawn Hall and producer/engineer John Fishbach, with Wesley Fontenot serving as chief engineer. The studio's largest room, Studio A, utilized a 48-channel SSL 4064 G+ loaded with 30 outboard microphone preamps.

Acts who have recorded at Piety Street include: Pretty Lights, Dr. Michael White, Dr. John, Ryan Adams, Dave Matthews Band, Garage A Trois, Dany Brillant, Elvis Costello & Allen Toussaint, Harold Battiste, Terence Blanchard, The Black Eyed Peas, Crowbar, Dirty Dozen Brass Band, Drums and Tuba, Joe Sample, Ed Sanders, 3 Doors Down, Steve Earle, Cassandra Wilson, Sierra Leone's Refugee All Stars, Harry Shearer, Judith Owen, OK GO, Shannon McNally, John Mooney, Nellie McKay, Erin McKeown, Korn, The Knux, Imagination Movers, Charlie Hunter, Hot 8 Brass Band, Happy Talk Band, Mary Flower, Nicholas Payton, Less Than Jake, James Singleton, Jon Cleary, Bo Kaspers Orkester, Alec Ounsworth, Peter Stampfel, Jay Weigel, and John Scofield who named a CD after the studio. Other artists who have used the Piety Street title on their CD's include James Blood Ulmer, Eric Lindell, and Christina Groth.

In August 2013, owner Mark Bingham shuttered the studio after 12 years of operation. When asked about his decision to vacate the space, his response was, "The spiritual intention of the city of New Orleans and its music scene is vastly different than it was 10 or 20 years ago," "It would have been fine to keep going, but I felt the world had changed.” Less than a year later, Alex Ebert, lead singer of the band Edward Sharpe and the Magnetic Zeros, bought the 4,865-square-foot studio for $750,000.
