= Page McConnell =

American music artist

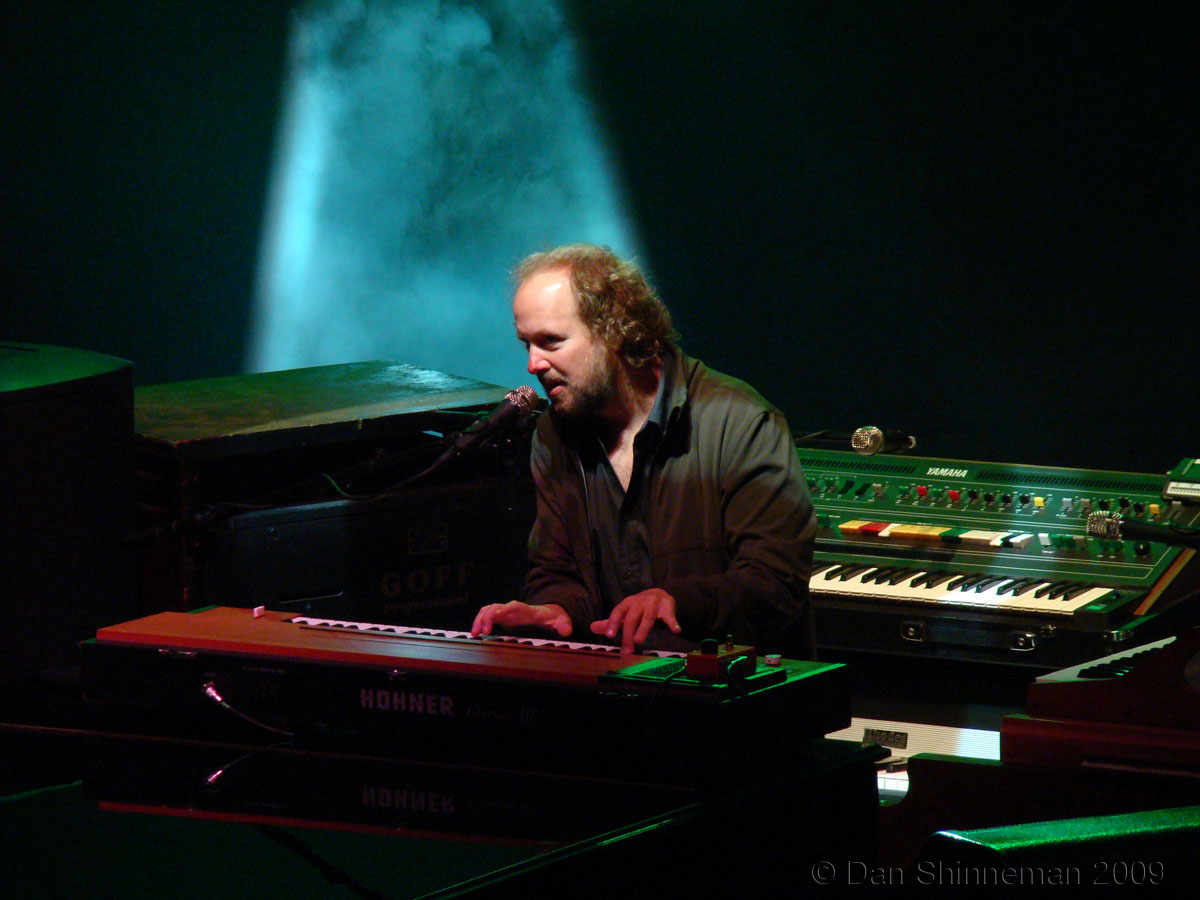
- McConnell with Phish at Red Rocks Amphitheater; July 30, 2009

Background information
- Also known as: The Chairman of the Boards, Leo, Godzilla
- Born: Page Samuel McConnell; May 17, 1963 (age 63); Philadelphia, Pennsylvania, U.S.
- Genres: Rock; jam; psychedelic; jazz; classical; electronica; progressive rock
- Occupations: Musician; songwriter
- Instruments: Keyboards; vocals
- Years active: 1981–present
- Label: Sony BMG
- Member of: Phish; Vida Blue
- Formerly of: Phil Lesh and Friends
- Website: Official website

Page Samuel McConnell (born May 17, 1963) is an American multi-instrumentalist, most noted for his work as the keyboardist and a songwriter for the band Phish.

McConnell joined Phish in 1985, and is the only member of its long-standing quartet lineup to not be an original member of the band. McConnell has been part of a number of other side projects, including leading the electronic jazz fusion band Vida Blue and acting as a session musician for the comedy rock duo Tenacious D. He released his debut solo album, Page McConnell, in 2007.

== Background ==
McConnell was born on May 17, 1963, in Philadelphia. By age four, he began to learn to play the piano, and in 1969 his family relocated to Basking Ridge, New Jersey. He continued his musical studies, eventually playing in bands with friends by seventh grade. His father, Dr. Jack B. McConnell, worked at McNeil Laboratories and helped to develop Tylenol and the MRI. The elder McConnell then started a free health clinic, Volunteers in Medicine, that is staffed by retired health workers in Hilton Head, South Carolina. Jack McConnell died in February 2018.

McConnell spent a year at Gill St. Bernard's School, in Gladstone, New Jersey before moving. McConnell spent his senior year of high school at Lawrence Academy, a boarding school in Groton, Massachusetts, and then attended Southern Methodist University from Fall 1982 to Spring 1984, where he joined Kappa Alpha Order and took a course called Imagination, Awareness, and Ideas taught by Donald Pasquella (based on Pasquella's 1974 paper called 'Imagination, Awareness, and Ideas: Helping The Student Become More Creative'), which McConnell later credited in his Goddard College senior study as "the most important course I have ever taken." McConnell transferred to Goddard College in the fall of 1984 where he met his mentor, saxophonist Karl Boyle, and wrote his senior study, The Art of Improvisation under Boyle's guidance. In his senior study, McConnell credited music teacher, Doug Freuler, for introducing him to jazz improvisation, and pianist Lar Duggan as “single most important person in helping me develop my improvisation”. McConnell graduated from Goddard in December 1987.

== With Phish ==
McConnell joined Phish in 1985 and played with the band for the first time on May 3 of that year. McConnell has written a number of Phish originals including "Cars Trucks Buses," "Magilla," "Army of One," "I Been Around," "Windy City," "Halfway to the Moon," "If I Told You.", "Things People Do.", and "I Always Wanted It This Way". He has also coauthored numerous other songs with the band.

== Other musical projects ==
In 1997, McConnell played keyboards on the title track of Scottish band Travis' debut album Good Feeling. The album was produced by Steve Lillywhite, who had produced Phish's Billy Breathes album in 1996. In early 2001, McConnell recorded with Tenacious D on their debut album, later joining the band onstage that September for a show at the Higher Ground nightclub in Winooski, Vermont. That same year, with Oteil Burbridge and Russell Batiste, McConnell was a founding member of Vida Blue which performed from 2001 to 2004, and reformed to record an album in 2018.

After a two-year hiatus from the music industry during Phish's hiatus, McConnell returned as a solo artist, recording an album of all new material in 2006. This eponymous album was released April 17, 2007 through Sony/BMG's Legacy Recordings. On signing with Legacy, McConnell has stated, "I know a lot of people on the internet, and that's certainly an option – especially these days and especially if you're catering to the Phish fans who already know who I am. But I wanted a little bit more than that... I was proud of the record, and I wanted as many people as possible to hear it when I was done with it."

McConnell headlined the High Sierra Music Festival in July 2007, which was held in Quincy, California. His touring band features multi-instrumentalist Jared Slomoff, guitarist Adam Zimmon, bassist Rob O'Dea, and drummer Gabe Jarrett. Said McConnell, "I have a really good feeling about this group. It feels like a band, although it's in its infancy right now. It really does feel like there is a collective consciousness."

From 2012 to 2015, McConnell toured on occasion with members of The Meters as The Meter Men.

== Instruments ==
Page McConnell's current rig on Phish includes:

- Hohner D6 Clavinet (running through a Whirlwind Orange Box phaser pedal and then to a Vox 847A wah-wah pedal and finally into a Fender Deluxe Reverb amp)
- 1991 Yamaha C7 concert grand (7'6") piano (since 2.3.93) mic'ed with a Helpinstill model 280 piano pickup and Neuman KM184 microphones
- 1959 Hammond B3 organ with a Leslie 122 speaker (modified with individual percussion boost and chorus depth control knobs for a more tuned effect) Remote mechanical volume pedal.
- 2019 Moog One 16 voice polyphonic synthesizer. The Moog One is the first polyphonic analog synthesizer from Moog in more than three decades
- (3) Wurlitzer pianos (Red 200, Blue 200, Tan 200A) All pianos fully restored, customized by Tim Warneck & Mike Norton From RetroLinear, all 3 Wurlitzers have Warneck Research Amplifiers The Wurlitzer 106P "Lil Pumpkin" was initially built by Ken Rich and overhauled by RetroLinear in 2018, also loaded with a Warneck Research Amplifier. (Source: RetroLinear)
- Yamaha CS-60 polyphonic synthesizer (2) Restored and RetroFitted with CS80MC Cards at RetroLinear 2024
- 1977 Fender Rhodes Suitcase 73 Model electric piano, vintage Maestro PS-1A Phase Shifter in effects loop, RetroLinear restored and loaded with PeterPanner Rhodes preamp (2024) (Source RetroLinear)
- a Moog Liberation (since 2009; formerly owned by James Brown) when playing Edgar Winter's "Frankenstein" with Phish
- a Nord Stage 3 HP76 Digital stage piano with piano, organ, and synthesizer sound engines
- All keyboard audio outputs plug into Radial DIs before going to the FOH mix

== Discography ==
=== Solo albums ===
- Page McConnell (April 17, 2007)
- Unsung Cities And Movies Never Made (April 20, 2013)
- Maybe We're the Visitors (April 9, 2021)
- Something Will Land (October 3, 2025)

=== Vida Blue albums ===
- Vida Blue (June 25, 2002, Elektra)
- The Illustrated Band (October 14, 2003, Sanctuary)
- Crossing Lines (September 20, 2019, ATO Records)

=== Other albums ===
- December (with Trey Anastasio) (January 29, 2021)
- January (with Trey Anastasio) (March 10, 2023)
