= Vida Blue (album) =

Studio album by Vida Blue
- Released: June 25, 2002 (US)
- Recorded: 2002
- Genre: jazz fusion, funk rock
- Length: 44:09
- Label: Elektra
- Producer: Russell Batiste, Page McConnell

Vida Blue chronology
Vida Blue (2002)	The Illustrated Band (2003)

Vida Blue is the debut album by Vida Blue, a trio featuring Phish keyboard player Page McConnell along with bass guitarist Oteil Burbridge and drummer Russell Batiste. It was recorded and released during Phish's break from touring.

The album features extended instrumental electronic keyboard pieces mixed with lyrical tracks featuring vocals by McConnell. The band briefly toured in support of the album before taking a year off following the reformation of Phish in late 2002.

== Reception ==
Professional ratings
Review scores
Source	Rating
AllMusic	3/5 stars
Rolling Stone	3/5 stars
Jambands: The Complete Guide to the Players, Music, & Scene	4/5 stars

In a review for AllMusic, Jesse Jarnow called the album "an interesting and promising debut," and noted: "the three veteran instrumentalists mesh well, though it is apparent that they haven't playing as a unit for all too long."

Writing for Rolling Stone, Kerry L. Smith described the music as "groovy, playful and technically awing," and commented: "Vida Blue is hypnotic and soothing -- a serene nightscape of shooting stars and floating keyboards."

Louis Miller of the CMJ New Music Report stated that the group "spends its time pumping out a heavy, groove-laden jazz and funk mix that will have all the beatniks bopping along," and concluded: "this is one record that is sure not to strike out."

In an article for the Hartford Courant, Jeff Puma wrote that "McConnell and company are willing to take musical chances, and that's what makes this album refreshing," but regretted that the band "will unjustly labor in Phish's shadow."

== Track listing ==
1. "Most Events Aren't Planned" - 7:41
2. "Where's Popeyes" - 4:35
3. "Electra Glide" - 4:45
4. "CJ3" - 12:10
5. "Fresh Tube" - 4:46
6. "Who's Laughing Now" - 6:24
7. "Final Flight" - 3:48

== Personnel ==
Vida Blue

- Page McConnell - vocals, keyboards
- Oteil Burbridge - bass guitar, vocals
- Russell Batiste - drums
