= Gulcher Records =

American independent record label

Gulcher Records is an independent record label founded in Bloomington, Indiana by Bob Richert in the mid-1970s, as one of the earliest small independent labels and fanzines in the area. They have released music for acts such as John Cougar Mellencamp, The Gizmos, Kurt Vile, Dancing Cigarettes, Magik Markers, Dow Jones and the Industrials, MX-80.
