= Happy Talk Band =

American band

Happy Talk Band is a seminal alt country/rock band from New Orleans featuring the songwriting of Luke Allen. The band pulls influences from traditional country and early rock. The band's music contains themes including the joys and pitfalls of booze, fist fighting, bank robbery, murder, religion, dope, exotic dancing, and family values. Happy Talk Band's discography is available on the New Orleans–based label Piety Street [Files and Archaic Media], which is the in house label of Piety Street Recording.

== Band members ==
=== Original ===
- Luke Allen – vocals, guitar, songwriter
- Bailey Smith – lead guitar
- Mike Lenore – upright bass
- Andy Harris – drums

=== Current ===
The current lineup of the band contains former members of the disbanded New Orleans rock group Morning 40 Federation. Accomplished solo artist Alex McMurray has also joined the most recent lineup.

- Luke Allen – lead vocal, guitar, songwriter
- Bailey Smith – guitar, vocals
- Alex McMurray – guitar, banjo, vocals
- Steve Calandra – bass guitar, vocals
- Mike Andrepont – drums
- Casey McAllister – pianos, organ, theremin, guitar, banjo, vocals

== Discography ==
- Total Death Benefit (2004)
- There there (2007)
- Starve a Fever (2010)
