= MX-80 =

Eclectic American art-rock band

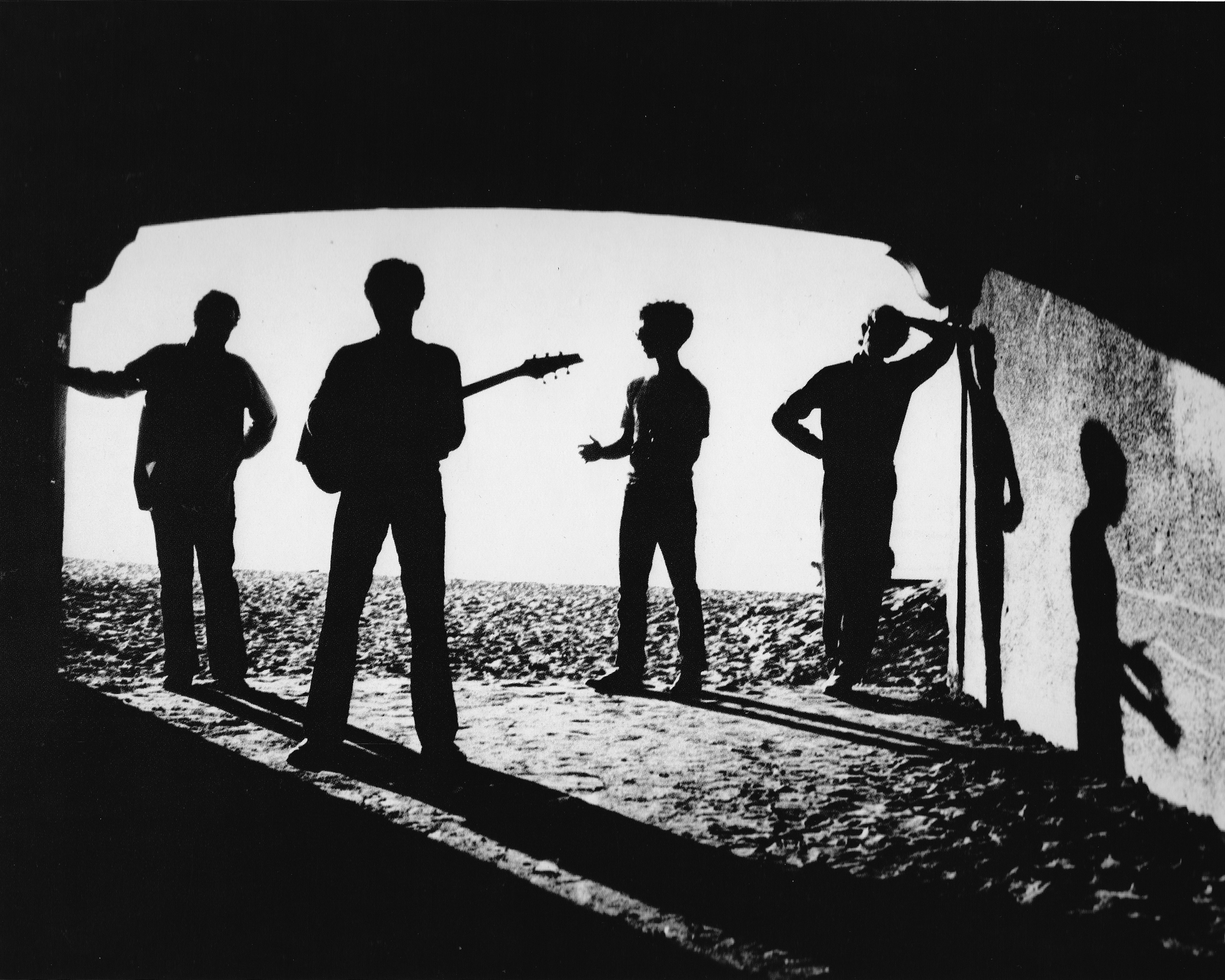
- Back cover Out of the Tunnel (1980); Photo by Kim Torgerson

Background information
- Also known as: MX-80 Sound
- Origin: Bloomington, Indiana, U.S.
- Genres: Experimental rock, noise rock, acid punk, post-punk
- Years active: 1974–present
- Labels: Bar-B-Q Records, Island, Ralph, Gulcher Records, Atavistic, Family Vineyard, a&r/ENT, Quadruped
- Members: Dale Sophiea; Rich Stim; Jim Hrabetin; Marc Weinstein
- Past members: Dave Mahoney; Jeff Armour; Kevin Teare; Bruce Anderson
- Website: www.mx-80sound.com

MX-80, also known as MX-80 Sound, is an eclectic American art-rock band founded in 1974 in Bloomington, Indiana, United States, by guitarist Bruce Anderson. Considered "one of the most out of step but prescient bands of its time", MX-80's signature sound consisted of breakneck metallic guitar combined with atonal chord structure, cross-rhythmic percussion and dispassionate vocals. Notoriously difficult to categorize—the band has been labeled noise rock, post-punk, acid punk, and heavy-metal—MX-80's sonic melange set the stage for bands such as Swans, Sonic Youth, Codeine, and Shellac.

== Early years ==
Originally named MX-80 Sound, MX-80 was formed in 1974 by Bruce Anderson (guitar) and Dale Sophiea (bass). Sophiea and Anderson, former members of Bloomington's Screaming Gypsy Bandits, shared an interest in modern classical composers as well as in avant rockers like Captain Beefheart and the Hampton Grease Band. They soon added two drummers, Jeff Armour, and Kevin Teare in 1975, and the quartet contributed the instrumental composition, Spoonfight, to Bloomington I (Bar-B-Q records 1976). Rich Stim (vocals, guitar, and sax) and Dave Mahoney (drums), both formerly of Chinaboise, joined MX-80 in 1976 and Teare left the band to pursue a full-time art career. Anderson and Stim emerged as the band's primary songwriters, with occasional lyric writing by Andrea Ross (aka Angel Corpus Christi).

Unable to obtain gigs in most local music venues, MX-80 performed a regular series of Sunday concerts at the Monroe County public library, tracks of which were later compiled on CD. The band's first studio release was the EP, Big Hits: Hard Pop From The Hoosiers (Bar-B-Q Records 1976), recorded at Gilfoy Studios, produced by Mark Bingham and engineered by Mark Hood. A review of Big Hits in the British music magazine Sounds by Caroline Coon, spurred Island Records A&R man Howard Thompson to license the band's second recording, their debut LP, Hard Attack (1977).

== Hard Attack ==
Hard Attack, also produced by Mark Bingham at Gilfoy Studios in Bloomington, was released only in Europe. Like their late-1970s midwestern compatriots Pere Ubu and Debris, MX-80's initial recording had little commercial success and critics were unsure what to make of them. Glenn O’Brien writing in Interview said of MX-80's debut, "[It] should establish MX-80 as either the most Heavy Metal Art Band or the most Arty Heavy Metal Band." Chuck Eddy called Hard Attack "a distorted free for all that set some eternal noisecore standard."

== San Francisco and Ralph Records ==
MX-80 relocated to San Francisco in 1978, a tumultuous year when the city reverberated from the Dan White shootings and subsequent riots (reflected in the track "White Night") and the Peoples Temple mass suicide (the band performed at the nearby Temple Beautiful soon after the tragedy, overlooking a parking lot filled with the victim's cars). MX-80 also performed at prominent punk venues such as the Mabuhay Gardens, Deaf Club, and Savoy Tivoli but the local reception was not enthusiastic and the band was considered out of sync with the punk and new-wave sensibility of groups such as Germs, Dils, and Avengers. Disheartened by the reaction, drummer Jeff Armour soon departed, reducing the band to a quartet.

In 1979, The Residents signed MX-80 to their label, Ralph Records, and two releases followed. The first Ralph recording, Out of the Tunnel (1980), was recorded at Mobius Music Studios, again with Mark Bingham producing. The album's back cover art was photographed by Kim Torgerson at San Francisco's now-buried Ocean Beach tunnels. Ira Robbins, writing in Trouser Press, said "Out of the Tunnel may well be MX-80's high-tide-mark, featuring convoluted breakneck melodies, cross-fed musical genres and Anderson's white hot soloing."

Their second Ralph release, Crowd Control (1981), was recorded at New York's Celebration Studios and was their final collaboration with producer Mark Bingham. Though Crowd Control contained two love songs – "Obsessive Devotion" and "Promise of Love" – compared to Out of the Tunnel, it was considered "a darker album, from a much darker year," and in general, "found the quartet simplifying some of the arrangements without losing the sense of crackling intensity and playful-while-being-serious performing of earlier efforts."

== After Ralph ==
After their relationship with Ralph Records ended, MX-80 dropped the "Sound" from its moniker and was allegedly plagued by legal problems (the details of which were never made clear). In 1984, the band returned with a two-drummer format with the addition of Marc Weinstein (ex-Mutants). The following year guitarist Jim Hrabetin (also ex-Mutants) joined. In 1986, the band released a cassette recording, Existential Lover (Quadruped). In 1990, the band combined previously released TV and movie themes with "furiously thrashed original material," for the album, Das Love Boat (a&r/ENT), perhaps the only instrumental recording to get a Parental Advisory).

In 1994, the band performed at Steve Albini's baseball-themed 'PineTar .406' concert in Chicago and the following year, MX-80 released their gloomiest recording, I've Seen Enough (Atavistic). Produced by and featuring David Immerglück (Camper Van Beethoven/Monks of Doom/Counting Crows), the album was dismissed by critics as "dull, slow shit ... like some bland off-brand ginger ale." It was followed by a live recording of a Chicago concert, Always Leave 'Em Wanting Less (Atavistic, 1997). In 2002, the band unearthed some live tapes from the 1970s resulting in the Gulcher release, Live at the Library.

In 2005, the band recorded and released We’re an American Band (Family Vineyard), featuring an oblique take on the Grand Funk Railroad title track. Forced Exposure called the album "both hilariously depressing and morosely upbeat ... a masterwork that mixes Satan, Howard Hughes and current theories on brain transplants." In 2006, long-time drummer Dave Mahoney died.

In 2019, Steve Albini and long-time collaborator Peter Conheim each contributed essays to a major career overview of MX-80 Sound and its offshoots on the online "culture zine", by NWR. Their short film for Ralph Records, Why Are We Here? received a full digital restoration, and newly unearthed video footage of the group close to its formation in the mid-1970s was debuted.

Bruce Anderson died in January 2022. In 2023, the band released Better Than Life, an album mixed by Steve Albini and Taylor Hales that was billed as their final studio album.

== Discography ==
- Big Hits EP (1976)
- Hard Attack (1977)
- Out of the Tunnel (1980)
- Crowd Control (1981)
- Existential Lover (1987)
- Das Love Boat (1990)
- I've Seen Enough (1995)
- Always Leave 'Em Wanting Less (1997)
- Live at the Library (2002)
- We're an American Band (2005)
- So Funny (2015)
- Hougher House (2021)
- Better Than Life (2023)
