= Oteil Burbridge =

American musician (born 1964)

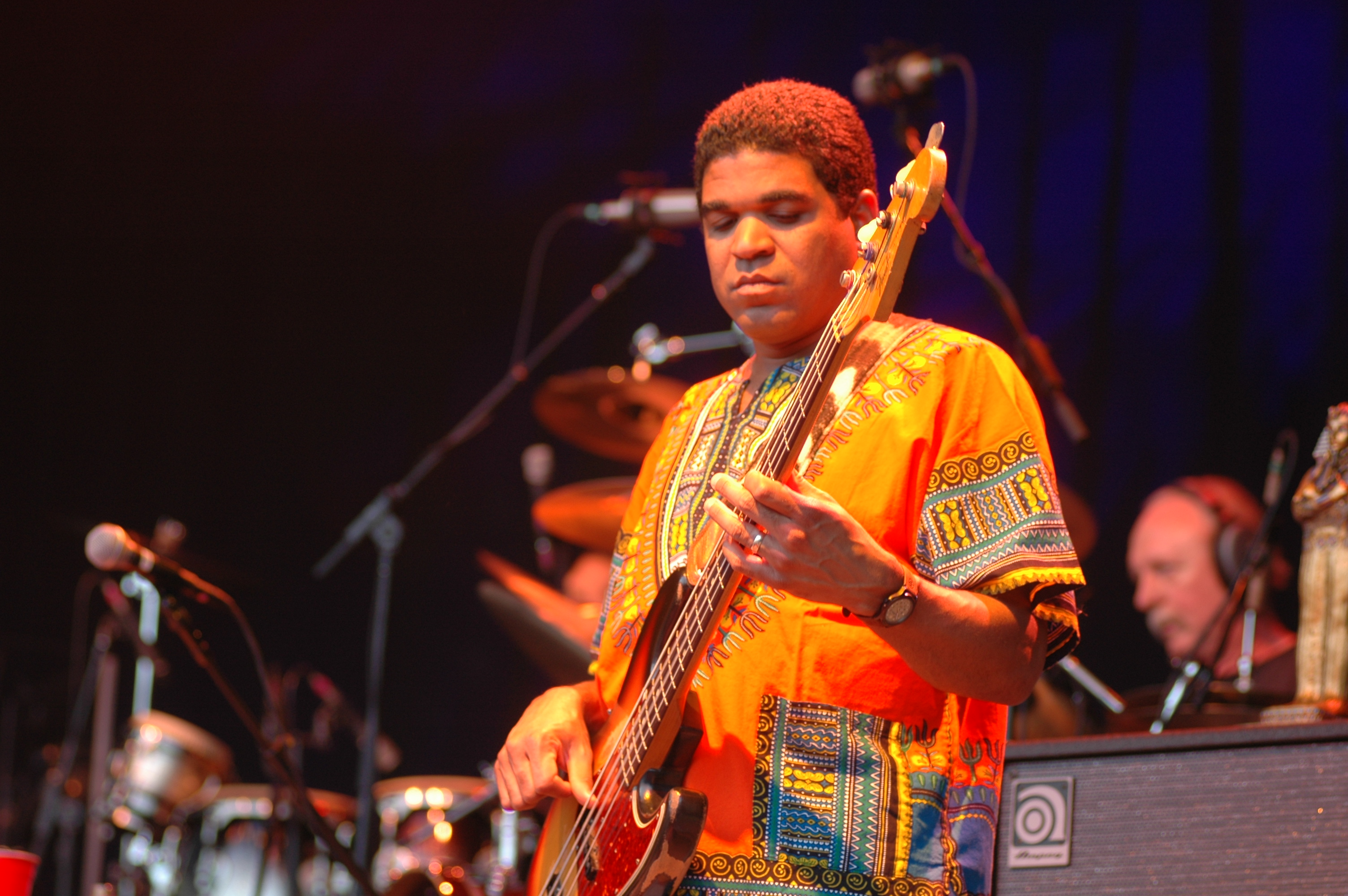
- Burbridge performing with the Allman Brothers Band in 2007

Background information
- Born: August 24, 1964 (age 62); Washington, D.C., United States
- Genres: Rock, jazz, blues, classical, funk, jam, psychedelia, southern rock
- Instruments: Bass guitar; drums; banjo; bass clarinet; piano
- Years active: 1989–present
- Labels: Epic, Sanctuary
- Formerly of: Aquarium Rescue Unit; The Allman Brothers Band; Oteil and the Peacemakers; Vida Blue; BK3; Tedeschi Trucks Band; Les Brers; Dead & Company
- Website: www.oteilburbridge.com

Oteil Burbridge (born August 24, 1964) is an American multi-instrumentalist who is primarily known for his skill on the bass guitar. Burbridge was trained in jazz and classical music from an early age. He achieved fame primarily during the resurgence of the Allman Brothers Band (from 1997 through 2014), and as a founding member of the band Dead & Company. Burbridge was also a founding member of The Aquarium Rescue Unit and Tedeschi Trucks Band, which also featured his brother Kofi Burbridge on keyboards and flute. He has worked with other musicians including Bruce Hampton, Trey Anastasio, Page McConnell, Bill Kreutzmann and Derek Trucks.

Burbridge has been recognized for his ability to incorporate scat-singing into his improvised bass solos. Burbridge endorses Fodera, Modulus, Sukop and Dunlop guitars and effects. He is ranked 64th on Bass Player magazine's list of "The 100 Greatest Bass Players of All Time".

== Musical career ==
=== Early endeavors ===
Burbridge was born and raised in Washington, D.C., to an African American family with some Egyptian heritage. His name, Oteil, means "explorer" or "wanderer". When he and elder sibling Kofi showed talent for music, their mother encouraged them with classical and jazz courses hoping to nurture their musical inclinations and keep them out of trouble. Kofi remembers Oteil's first drum set: a Quaker Oatmeal box, when he was only three or four years old.

Both brothers were introduced to a wide variety of instruments, and became multi-instrumentalists, with both being taught to play the piano. Oteil gained proficiency on the bass clarinet, violin, and trumpet; however, bass guitar and drums became his instruments of choice (while Kofi developed a love for both flute and keyboards). Burbridge was also interested in the theater and became the co-host of a local children's television show called "Stuff". He was enrolled in the Sidwell Friends School, graduating in 1982.

Oteil performed regularly in a variety of D.C. bands as a teenager, gathering experience playing R&B, rock, Brazilian music and jazz among other styles. He moved to Virginia Beach and worked mostly in cover bands there, and subsequently became part of the Atlanta musical scene, where he played with different musicians and also became fluent in other genres of music.

=== The Aquarium Rescue Unit ===
As one of the original members of Bruce Hampton's avant-garde band, the Aquarium Rescue Unit, Burbridge was introduced to members of the jam band scene in the southeast of the United States. This included members of Phish, Phil Lesh and Friends, and Blues Traveler, who freely sat in with one another in each other's bands.

When Hampton left the Aquarium Rescue Unit, it slowly disbanded; however, Burbridge had developed a reputation on the four-, five-, and eventually the six-string bass guitar, enjoying the less commercial aspects of playing with Atlanta-area musicians. During its initial years, the band was composed of Bruce Hampton, Oteil Burbridge, Jimmy Herring, Jeff Sipe, Matt Mundy, and Count M'Butu. Although the band was never commercially successful, their unique combination of bluegrass, rock, Latin, blues, jazz, and funk (along with the impeccable chops of the members) led to their becoming an influence on other bands and served as a kind of template for their own future musical endeavors.

== Musical collaborations ==
=== Dead & Company ===
In 2015 Burbridge joined Dead & Company to play bass/drums. The band consists of himself with Bob Weir, John Mayer, Mickey Hart, Jay Lane and Jeff Chimenti. The band's first performance was on October 29, 2015 at Times Union Center in Albany, New York. They have since toured in the fall of 2015, the summer of 2016, the summer of 2017, the fall of 2017, the summer of 2018, and did a series of three shows in Mexico called "Playing in the Sand" in January 2019. Dead & Company started their Summer Tour 2019 at the Shoreline Amphitheatre in Mountain View, California on May 31 and June 1, 2019. They toured again in the summer of 2021, summer of 2022 and the final tour in summer 2023. He played with the band again during their summer 2024 and spring 2025 residencies at The Sphere.

=== Les Brers ===
In 2015 Burbridge became a founding member of Les Brers, a band led by founding Allman Brothers Band drummer Butch Trucks. The band also consists of his former Allman Brothers bandmates Jaimoe, Marc Quiñones and Jack Pearson along with Pat Bergeson, Bruce Katz and Lamar Williams Jr.

== Previous musical collaborations ==
=== The Allman Brothers Band ===
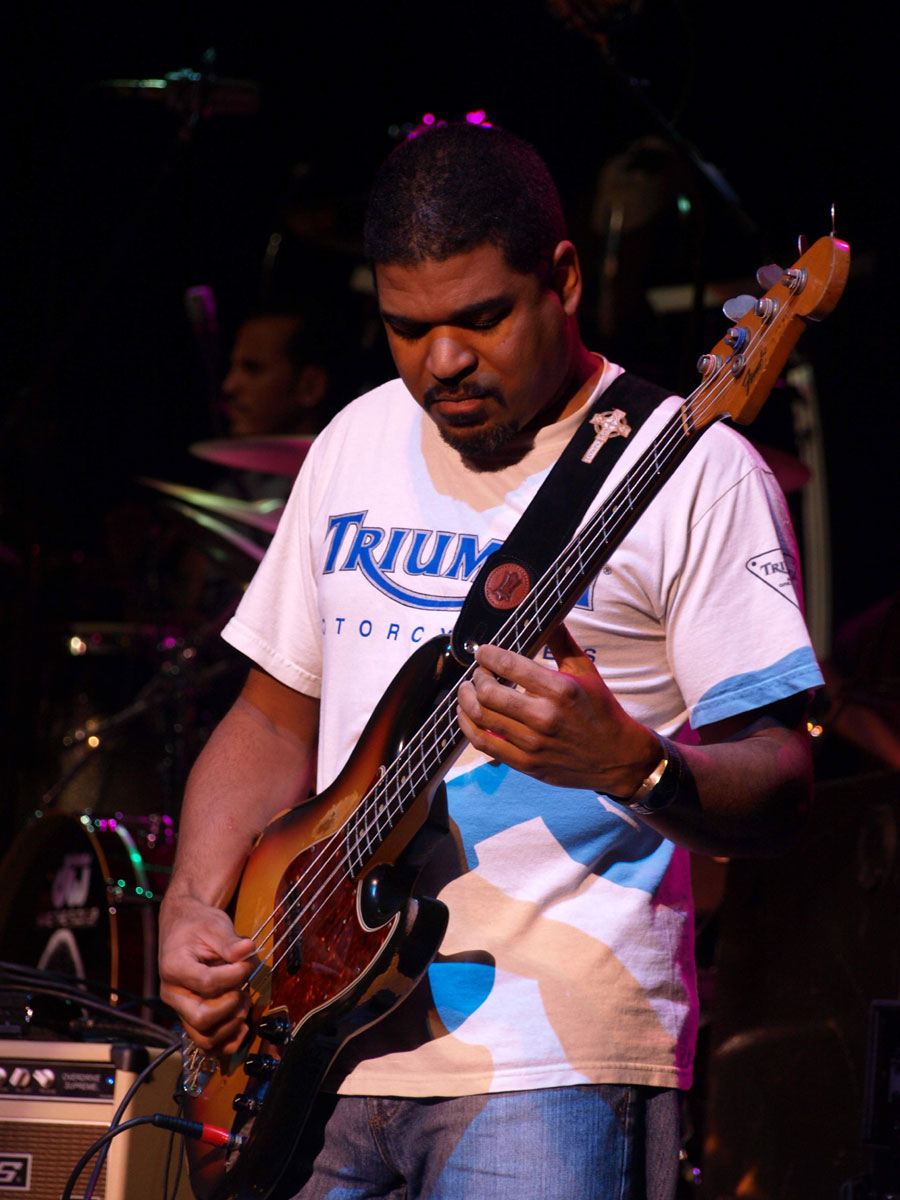
Burbridge performing with the Allman Brothers band in 2009

Burbridge was a full-time member of the Allman Brothers Band from 1997 until their retirement in 2014, touring and recording with the band for 17 years. In February 2012, he received a Grammy Lifetime Achievement Award for his years with the band. Burbridge played on the albums Peakin' at the Beacon (2000), Hittin' the Note (2003), One Way Out (2004) as well as the DVD Live at the Beacon Theatre (2003, certified Platinum 2004). He was nominated for two Grammy Awards as a member of the band in 2003 and 2004. He occasionally provided lead vocals with the band, including their cover of the Dead's "Franklin’s Tower" and, during the Brothers' final year, "Seven Turns."

=== Tedeschi Trucks Band ===
In 2010, Oteil joined his brother Kofi and Allman Brothers bandmate Derek Trucks as the bassist in the new group Tedeschi Trucks Band; an eleven-piece ensemble which merged some former members of The Derek Trucks Band and Susan Tedeschi's backing band. Tedeschi Trucks Band performed at Eric Clapton's Crossroads Guitar Festival 2010; one of Oteil's compositions "Love Has Something Else to Say" appears on the DVD release. The Tedeschi Trucks Band released their debut album, Revelator, in 2011, which won the Grammy for Best Blues Album at the 54th Grammy Awards. In 2012, the band released their sophomore album, Everybody's Talkin' , a double live album compiled from their 2011 world tour.

On October 5, 2012, Oteil posted a statement on the band's website that he "will not be able to continue to tour with TTB", so he can start a family. He did "hope that we have music left to make together in the future."

=== BK3 ===
Oteil Burbridge joined the Bill Kreutzmann Trio alongside Bill Kreutzmann of the Grateful Dead and Scott Murawski of Max Creek, as the BK3. They toured throughout 2008 and early 2009 before Oteil left due to touring commitments with the Allman Brothers Band. The group played several Grateful Dead classics, Max Creek originals and covers, as well as many new songs written by Robert Hunter.[4]

=== Oteil and the Peacemakers ===
In 1998, Burbridge formed a band called Oteil and the Peacemakers. Based in Birmingham, Alabama, it featured musicians Matt Slocum on keyboards, Mark Kimbrell on guitar, Chris Fryar on drums, and vocalist Paul Henson, a carry over from the post-Colonel Aquarium Rescue Unit releases. They released their first album, Love of a Lifetime, that same year. That was followed up in 2003 by the CD/DVD set entitled The Family Secret. In 2005, Burbridge took his music in a greater spiritual direction for their third album titled Believer.

=== Vida Blue ===
Burbridge also was approached by Page McConnell of Phish who invited him and Russell Batiste, Jr. (then of the Funky Meters) to participate in another venture as an electronic trio with vocals. Their name was not chosen until Major League Baseball pitcher Vida Blue hopped up on stage with them and they decided to name themselves after the baseball star. The trio formed in 2001 and continued performing until 2004, putting out a DVD and two albums, and later joining forces with a Latin-rock sextet which sampled a variety of musical genres including the jazz and electronic music-flavored alternative rock music of Vida Blue.

== Other projects ==
=== The Adventures of the Green Thumb and Purple Haze ===
The Green Thumb is a serial comic book that Burbridge created with artist LeVar Carter following the adventures of twin cannabis superheroes. The comic explores themes involving the power of nature and spirituality, the role corporations and governments play in stifling scientific and cultural advancements for the purpose of preserving profits and power, and also what it means to be deemed illegal just by one's lot in life (as it pertains to one's biology, nationality, gender, sexuality). A book featuring the characters was published in 2014.

=== Film ===
Burbridge also had a bit part, as a teenager, playing a street thug named Lolo in the 1979 Peter Sellers movie Being There. The movie is a black comedy about politics and the woes of celebrity and fame. Although Burbridge plays a small part in a short scene, it is one of the film's many famous moments.

=== Podcast ===
Since 2020 Burbridge has cohosted the Comes A Time Podcast with comedian Mike Finoia.

Oteil is a fan of professional wrestling.

== Discography ==
=== Solo ===
- Water in the Desert (2017)
- Lovely View of Heaven (2023)

=== With The Zac Brown Band ===
- The Grohl Sessions, Vol. 1 (2013)

=== With The Tedeschi Trucks Band ===
- Revelator (2011)
- Everybody's Talkin' (2012)

=== With The Allman Brothers Band ===
- Peakin' at the Beacon (2000)
- Hittin' the Note (2003)
- Live at the Beacon Theatre (DVD) (2003)
- One Way Out (2004)
- 40 (DVD) (2014)
- The Fox Box (2017)
- Cream of the Crop 2003 (2018)
- Warner Theatre, Erie, PA 7-19-05 (2020)

=== With Oteil and the Peacemakers ===
- Love of a Lifetime (1998)
- The Family Secret (2003)
- Believer (2005)

=== With Vida Blue ===
- Vida Blue (2002)
- The Illustrated Band (2003)
- Crossing Lines (2019)

=== With The Aquarium Rescue Unit ===
- Col. Bruce Hampton & the Aquarium Rescue Unit (1992)
- Mirrors of Embarrassment (1993)
- Eepeee (1994)
- In a Perfect World (1994)
- The Calling (2003)

=== Other ===
- Arkansas (1987/2000) – Col Bruce Hampton
- Gossip (1996) – T Lavitz
- Surrender to the Air (1996) – Surrender to the Air
- What Did He Say? (1997) – Victor Wooten
- Bass Extremes: Cookbook (1998) – Steve Bailey, Victor Wooten
- Bass Day '98 (1999) – various artists
- Searching for Simplicity (1998) – Gregg Allman
- The Stranger's Hand (1999) – Oteil Burbridge, Howard Levy, Jerry Goodman, Steve Smith
- Croakin' at Toad's (2000) – Frogwings
- The Deep End, Volume 1 (2001) – Gov't Mule
- Live in NYC 6/16/04 (2005) – Heavenly Jams Band
- Go There (2007) – Scott Sawyer
- Lifeboat (2008) – Jimmy Herring
- The Imagine Project (2010) – Herbie Hancock
- Cooking With Dynamite! (2011) – Hawk Tubley & The Airtight Chiefs
- Ashes & Dust (2015) – Warren Haynes
