= Love of a Lifetime (album) =

Studio album by Oteil and the Peacemakers
- Released: 1998
- Studios: The Cave Studio, Atlanta, Georgia
- Genre: Jazz fusion
- Length: 1:06:22
- Label: Nile Music

Oteil and the Peacemakers chronology
Love of a Lifetime (1998)	The Family Secret (2003)

Love of a Lifetime is the debut album by Oteil and the Peacemakers, a band led by bassist Oteil Burbridge. It was recorded at The Cave Studio in Atlanta, Georgia, and was released on CD in 1998 by Nile Music. On the album, Burbridge is joined by Kofi Burbridge on flute and keyboards, Mark Kimbrell and Regi Wooten on guitar, Kebbi Williams on saxophone, and Marcus Williams and Woody Williams on drums.

== Reception ==
Professional ratings
Review scores
Source	Rating
AllMusic	2.5/5 stars
Jambands: The Complete Guide to the Players, Music, & Scene	3/5 stars

In a review for AllMusic, Steve Kurutz wrote: "this album reeks of the kind of soft jazz noodling one hears in a department store during after-Christmas sales. Granted it does explore a different side of Oteil than the one heard during the cosmic, marathon blues workouts of the Allmans, but by no means does that fact make Lifetime any more exciting to listen to."

Writer Dean Budnick stated that Love of a Lifetime "is a band album, not a bass album," and commented: "He draws in some fine players... While the musicianship is tasteful, at times the songs themselves are a bit mired in softer, smooth jazz territory."

In an article for Jambands.com, Max Delaney called the album "an important landmark in Oteil's career," and remarked that it "covers a lot of bases ranging from heavy old school funk a la James Brown and The Meters to more contemporary jazz to some grungy fusion style funk and there is a great overall flow... Oteil demonstrates his versatility not just as a player but also as a composer." He concluded: "The more you listen to this album, the more you will hear on it."

Writing for Jazz Times, Hilarie Grey stated: "Filled with deep, dark bass work and contagious rhythms... Love of a Lifetime... offers a funky fusion stew of intricately arranged, yet melodically accessible compositions... the band displays amazing musicianship in a variety of tricky settings"

Jeff Potter, writing for Modern Drummer, noted that the two drummers "complement each other perfectly, providing Burbridge with an engaging one-two percussion punch," and commented: "It's a joy to hear these drummers obviously having a wonderful time expressing themselves alongside a bassist with monstrous facility."

== Track listing ==
"Overcast" and "In There Out There" by Kofi Burbridge. Remaining tracks by Oteil Burbridge.

1. "Subterranea" – 6:05
2. "Barri's Song" – 7:33
3. "Butter Biscuit" – 6:13
4. "Overcast" – 6:29
5. "Ankh" – 7:19
6. "Listen Bart" – 6:22
7. "Monk Funk" – 6:16
8. "Church" – 8:43
9. "In There Out There" – 7:56
10. "Hymn to the Nile" – 3:26

== Personnel ==
- Oteil Burbridge – bass, guitar, vocals
- Kofi Burbridge – keyboards, flute
- Mark Kimbrell – guitar (tracks 1, 2, and 4)
- Regi Wooten – guitar (track 6)
- Kebbi Williams – tenor saxophone (tracks 5 and 8)
- Marcus Williams – drums (tracks 1, 3, 5–8)
- Woody Williams – drums (tracks 2, 4, and 9)
