= Dow Jones and the Industrials =

American new wave band (1979–1981)

- Dow Jones and the Industrials c. 1979

Background information
- Origin: West Lafayette, Indiana
- Genres: New wave, synth-punk
- Years active: 1979-1981
- Labels: Family Vineyard, Gulcher Records, Hardly Music
- Past members: Brad Garton; Chris Clark; Greg Horn; Tim North; Jenny Sweeny

Dow Jones and the Industrials were a new wave band from West Lafayette, Indiana, from 1979 until 1981. Originally, the band consisted of Greg Horn on guitar and vocals, Chris Clark on bass and vocals, Tim North on drums, and Brad Garton (known as "Mr. Science") on keyboards. A contemporary review of a live show said the band sounded like "early Who would if amplified through a computer being hit with a sledgehammer." The use of the keyboard, and the band's flirtation with electronic sounds, meant that Dow Jones and the Industrials hinted towards the post-punk sound of bands that would follow them.

In 1980, the band released a split LP with the Gizmos, entitled "Hoosier Hysteria", and a self-titled 7-inch EP. In 1981, the band's track "Ladies With Appliances" was featured on the Red Snerts compilation released by Gulcher Records. By this time, Chris Clark had left, to be replaced by Jenny Sweeny on bass. Brad Garton had also left the group. He appeared as "Mr. Science" on the compilation, contributing a track entitled "Mr. Science".

After the demise of Dow Jones and the Industrials, Greg Horn went on to form the synth-pop band Tone Set with Galen Herod. During the years 1983 to 1990, he also released two solo cassettes, both in a similar stylistic vein as that of Tone Set. He has also released material under the name Pointless, produced music for Japanese TV commercials, and for Nickelodeon's "Eureeka's Castle".

In 2016, Family Vineyard issued the discography compilation album Can't Stand the Midwest, which collects the entirety of their Hoosier Hysteria and Dow Jones and the Industrials records, as well as previously unreleased demo and live material. To celebrate the release, the band reunited to play in Lafayette.

== Discography ==
- Hoosier Hysteria split LP with the Gizmos (1980, Gulcher Records)
- Dow Jones and the Industrials 7-inch (1980, Hardly Music Records)
- Can't Stand the Midwest compilation album (September 2016, Family Vineyard)
