= The Gizmos =

American punk band

- The original line-up of the Gizmos

Background information
- Origin: Bloomington, Indiana, U.S.
- Genre: Punk rock
- Years active: 1976-1978, 2014
- Label: Gulcher Records
- Members: Ken Highland, Eddie Flowers, Ted Niemiec, Rich Coffee
- Past members: Rick Czajka, Dave Medlock, Dave Sulak, Jim DeVries, Steve Feikes, Phil Hundley, Shadow Myers, Dale Lawrence, Billy Nightshade, Tim Carroll, Crash Kinser, Robbie Wise.

The Gizmos were an American punk band formed in Bloomington, Indiana, United States, in 1976. The original band was made up of Ken Highland, Eddie Flowers, Ted Niemiec and the members of a group called Cerberus; Rich Coffee, Dave Sulak, Rick Czajka, and Jim DeVries. The Gizmos released three 7-inch EPs on Gulcher Records in 1976, 1977, and 1978.

In late 1977 the band broke up. Then, Ted Niemiec recruited new members to form a new version of the Gizmos. This version of the band released one EP, "Never Mind The Sex Pistols Here's The Gizmos".

After Niemiec left the band, new member Dale Lawrence carried on using the band name with new members.

== After the Gizmos ==
Ken Highland later relocated to Boston, Massachusetts, where he has been in a long string of garage-oriented bands over the years, including Club Linehan a Go-Go, the Hopelessly Obscure, Johnny & the Jumper Cables, the Kenne Highland Clan, the Goody Goody Gumdrops, and the Vatican Sex Kittens.

Eddie Flowers and Rich Coffee moved to Los Angeles in the late 1970s and become active in the underground rock scene there. Flowers started Crawlspace with members of the Lazy Cowgirls in 1985. Coffee sang and played in Thee Fourgiven and the Tommyknockers, influenced by late 1960s pre-punk hard rock bands like the MC5 and the Doors as well as more recent acts like the Cramps, the Gun Club, and Billy Childish. The bands of both Coffee and Flowers were associated with the Sympathy for the Record Industry record label.

== Members ==
=== Cerberus ===
- Rich Coffee — guitar, vocals
- Rick Czajka — guitar
- Dave Sulak — bass
- Jim DeVries — drums

=== Gizmos #1 ===
- Ken Highland — lead guitar, lead vocals
- Eddie Flowers — lead vocals
- Ted Niemiec — lead vocals
- Rich Coffee — rhythm guitar, background vocals
- Dave Sulak — bass
- Rick Czajka — rhythm/lead guitar (EP1 only)
- Davey Medlock — background vocals
- Don Jaskulske — background vocals
- Jim DeVries — drums #1
- Jim Kohl — drums #2

=== Gizmos #2 ===
- Ted Niemiec — lead vocals
- Dale Lawrence — rhythm guitar
- Steve Feikes — rhythm guitar
- Billy Nightshade — bass
- Phil Hundley — tambourine, background vocals, percussion
- Shadow Myers — drums
- Don Jaskulske — background vocals

=== Gizmos #3 ===
This version of the Gizmos was one of the first corn punk bands in the U.S.

- Dale Lawrence — vocals, rhythm guitar
- Billy Nightshade — bass, vocals
- Tim Carroll — guitar
- Shadow Myers — drums #1
- Crash Kinser — drums #2
- Robbie Wise — drums #3

=== Gizmos #4 ===
This is a re-union of the original 1976 line up.
Main members

- Ken Highland — lead guitar, lead vocals
- Eddie Flowers — lead vocals
- Ted Niemiec — lead vocals
- Rich Coffee — rhythm guitar, background vocals
- Davey Medlock — background vocals

Rhythm section #1

- Ian Brewer — guitar
- John Terrill — drums
- Max Demata — bass

Rhythm section #2

- Craig Bell — bass
- Kelsey Simpson — drums
- Sam Murphy — guitar

Rhythm section #3

- Kenny Kaiser — guitar
- MJ Quirk — bass
- Matt Burns — drums

== Discography ==
=== EPs ===
Gizmos #1

- "Muff Divin'" EP (1976)
- "Amerika First" EP (1977)
- "World Tour" EP (1978)

Gizmos #2

- "Never Mind The Sex Pistols Here's The Gizmos" EP (1978)

Gizmos #3

- Hoosier Hysteria! (Split album with Dow Jones and the Industrials) (1980)

=== Compilations ===
- 1975-1977: Demos & Rehearsals (2000) - Gizmos #1
- 1976: The Rockabilly Yobs Session (2001) - Gizmos #1
- The Midwest Can Be Allright (2001) - Gizmos #3
- 1978-1981:Never Mind The Gizmos Here's The Gizmos (2002) - Gizmos #2 and #3
- Rock & Roll Don't Come From New York (2004) - Gizmos #3
- 1976/1977: The Studio Recordings (2006) - Gizmos #1
