= Mark Bingham (musician) =

American music producer (born 1949)

Mark Bingham (born 1949 in Bloomington, Indiana) is an American music producer, composer, musician, and engineer.

In 1966, Bingham was signed to a publishing contract with Elektra Records. After a brief stint at Elektra in Los Angeles and one single (deep regret/your problems and mine) released on Warner Bros., he returned to Bloomington where he attended Indiana University. There he joined the avant-rock group Screaming Gypsy Bandits and also began his own indie label, Bar-B-Q Records. In 1975, he moved to New York City, forming the Social Climbers with bassist-singer Jean Seton Shaw and keyboardist/arranger/composer Dick Connette.

In 1982, he moved to New Orleans. He started The Boiler Room recording studio and in 2001 opened Piety Street Recording. Bingham and Piety Street were featured in HBO's "Treme" series. Other notable sessions Bingham recorded at Piety Street include Dr. John's Mercernary, James "Blood " Ulmer's Bad Blood In the City: The Piety Street Sessions and Fugs founder Ed Sanders' Poems For New Orleans for which Bingham co-produced and composed the music. In 2011, Bingham recorded, mixed and helped arrange the Marianne Faithfull LP Horses and High Heels.

Bingham has produced records for Flat Duo Jets, Glenn Branca, Dr. Michael White, Ed Sanders, Rebirth Brass Band, John Scofield, MX-80, Happy Talk Band, Cubanismo, The Du-tels, The Naked Orchestra, Morning 40 Federation, Mem Shannon, Andrei Codrescu, Sarah Quintana, Byron Knott, The Write Brothers, Paul Sanchez, Peter Stampfel and Michael Cerveris among others.

A long-standing colleague of Hal Willner, Bingham participated in a series of Willner tribute recordings, including 1984's That's the Way I Feel Now: A Tribute to Thelonious Monk, 1985's Lost in the Stars: The Music of Kurt Weill and 1989's Stay Awake: Various Interpretations of Music from Vintage Disney Films. He also played guitar and contributed compositions to Allen Ginsberg's The Lion For Real.

In 1991, Bingham arranged horns and strings on R.E.M.'s Out Of Time.

He has released two albums under his own name; 1989's I Passed For Human and Psalms Of Vengeance (2009).
