= Russell Batiste Jr. =

American drummer (1965–2023)

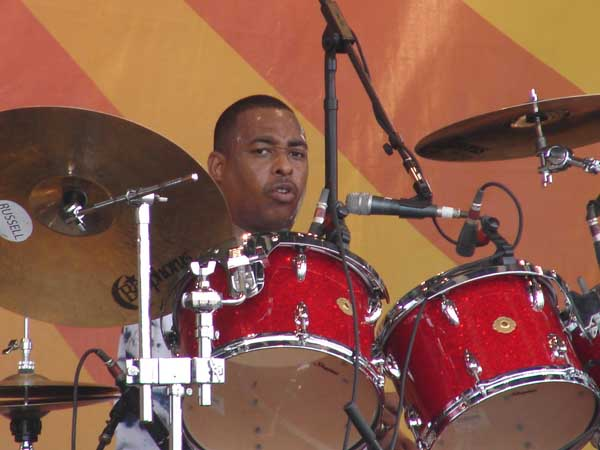
- Batiste in 2008

Background information
- Birth name: David Russell Batiste Jr.
- Born: December 12, 1965; New Orleans, Louisiana, U.S.
- Died: September 30, 2023 (aged 57); LaPlace, Louisiana, U.S.
- Genres: Funk, Rhythm and blues, Blues
- Occupation: Musician
- Instrument: Drums
- Years active: 1973–2023
- Formerly of: The funky Meters, Papa Grows Funk, Vida Blue.

David Russell Batiste Jr. (December 12, 1965 – September 30, 2023) was an American drummer based in New Orleans. Batiste played drums for the bands the funky Meters, Papa Grows Funk, and Vida Blue.

== Biography ==
David Russell Batiste Jr. was born in New Orleans on December 12, 1965. He was a member of the New Orleans musical family, the Batiste family; he started playing drums at the age of four. He also learned to play keyboards, saxophone, guitar and bass, and started to play in the family band when he was seven.

Batiste left college after two years to join Charmaine Neville's band. He joined the funky Meters, the reincarnation of the funk band The Meters, in 1989. The funky Meters without Art Neville played under the name Porter Batiste Stoltz (PBS) (with George Porter Jr. on bass, and Brian Stoltz on guitar).He also played drums with George Porter Jr. and the Runnin Pardners.

As a solo artist, he led his own band Russell Batiste Jr. and the Orkestra from 'Da Hood and has released two albums under the name.

Batiste also played regularly with organ player Joe Krown and guitarist Walter "Wolfman" Washington as the Krown Washington Batiste trio. This unit released a live CD Live at the Maple Leaf in 2008.

Batiste performed with a wide range of musicians and bands including Papa Grows Funk, Vida Blue, Harry Connick Jr., Champion Jack Dupree, Robbie Robertson and Maceo Parker. In 1987, Batiste was in the New Orleans funk band Nuclear Rhythms featuring percussionist songwriter Rosie Rosato, psychedelic funk guitarist songwriter Dirk Billie, bassist songwriter Mark Adam Miller and guitar and keyboard player David M. Brown.

Batiste died of heart attack at his home in LaPlace, Louisiana, on September 30, 2023, at the age of 57. His funeral was scheduled for October 10 at St. Katharine Drexel Church in New Orleans.

== Awards and honors ==
=== OffBeat's Best of The Beat Awards ===
Year	Category	Work nominated	Result	Ref.
2009	Best R&B/Funk Album	Live at the Maple Leaf (with Joe Krown and Walter “Wolfman” Washington)	Won	
2023	Best Drummer		Won	

== Discography ==
=== Solo works ===
- 2000 Orkestra from 'Da Hood (Russell Batiste Jr.)
- 2003 The Clinic (Russell Batiste Jr.)

=== With The funky Meters ===
- 2003 Fiyo at the Fillmore, Vol. 1 (Fuel 2000)

=== With Vida Blue ===
- 2002 Vida Blue (Elektra)
- 2003 The Illustrated Band (Sanctuary)
- 2019 Crossing Lines (ATO Records)

=== With Porter Batiste Stoltz ===
- 2005 Expanding The Funkin' Universe (Ouw)
- 2008 Moodoo (High Steppin' Productions)

=== With Krown Washington Batiste ===
- 2008 Live at the Maple Leaf (Independent)
- 2010 Triple Threat (Independent)
- 2013 Soul Understanding (Independent)
