= Dead Forever: Live at Sphere =

Concert residency by Dead & Company

- Residency by Dead & Company
- 2024 Residency Logo
- Location: Paradise, Nevada, U.S.
- Venue: Sphere
- Start date: May 16, 2024
- End date: May 17, 2025
- Legs: 2
- No. of shows: 48
- Attendance: 477,000
- Box office: $131.4 million

Dead & Company concert chronology
- Dead & Company Summer Tour 2023; Dead Forever: Live at Sphere; Dead & Company: Celebrating 60 Years of the Grateful Dead's Music

Dead Forever: Live at Sphere is a concert residency by the American rock band Dead & Company at Sphere on the Las Vegas Strip in Paradise, Nevada.

Originally scheduled for a run of 30 shows beginning in May 2024, the production was revived for a second, 18-show run beginning in March 2025.

The residency was positively received by fans and critics, who praised the band's performance and the Sphere's visual displays and audio capabilities. The 2024 shows sold 477,000 tickets and grossed $131.4 million, making it 10th-highest-grossing concert residency of all time.

== Background ==
=== Sphere ===
Sphere is spherical, immersive music and entertainment venue in the Las Vegas Valley, known for its 160,000-square-foot (15,000 m^{2}) LED screen that wraps around the interior. Sphere opened in September 2023 with the 40-show residency U2:UV Achtung Baby Live by the Irish rock band U2. American rock band Phish played a four-day residency at the venue in April 2024.

=== Dead & Company ===
Following speculation of the band's potential dissolution after their 2023 summer tour, drummer Mickey Hart hinted at the possibility of future Dead & Company shows, explaining: "It's not final anything. We never said we'll never play again, but we'll never tour again."

Prior to performing at Sphere, Dead & Company had never undertaken a concert residency, instead favoring traditional touring and festival appearances. Since their formation in 2015, the band primarily toured North America, performing in major arenas, stadiums, and amphitheaters. In addition to their annual tours, they hosted Playing in the Sand, a multi-night destination festival in Cancún, Mexico, where they performed exclusive sets for fans in an intimate beachfront setting. The decision to embark on a residency at Sphere marked a significant departure from their usual touring model, offering a stationary, immersive concert experience unlike any in the band's history.

== Development ==
Lead guitarist John Mayer served as the creative director of the residency and worked with the creative agency Treatment Studio and Industrial Light & Magic to produce the visuals displayed on Sphere's wraparound LED screen. Initial production took approximately six months according to Mayer, and development of new visuals continued throughout the first leg of the residency.

== Announcement and itinerary ==
Rumors about a potential Dead & Company residency at Sphere began circulating following the conclusion of their 2023 summer tour. On February 1, 2024, Dead & Company officially announced the residency, which was initially scheduled to have consist of only 24 shows, beginning on May 16 and concluding on July 13. The residency was eventually extended into August 2024 with six additional concerts. The band was the third act to play at the venue.

During both legs of the residency, the band performed three nights a week, typically on Thursday, Friday, and Saturday nights.

On June 19, the band played a private one-set concert for Hewlett Packard Enterprise's 2024 Discover Conference, which was being held at the Venetian Resort that adjoins Sphere.

On December 4, 2024, the band announced they would revive the residency production and return to Sphere for a second leg of 18 shows beginning on March 20, 2025. The shows were meant to celebrate the band's 10-year anniversary.

== Show synopsis and production ==
Consistent with all previous Dead & Company tours, each show featured a unique setlist, ensuring that no songs were repeated within a single weekend. This approach ensured fans received a fresh and varied experience at every show.

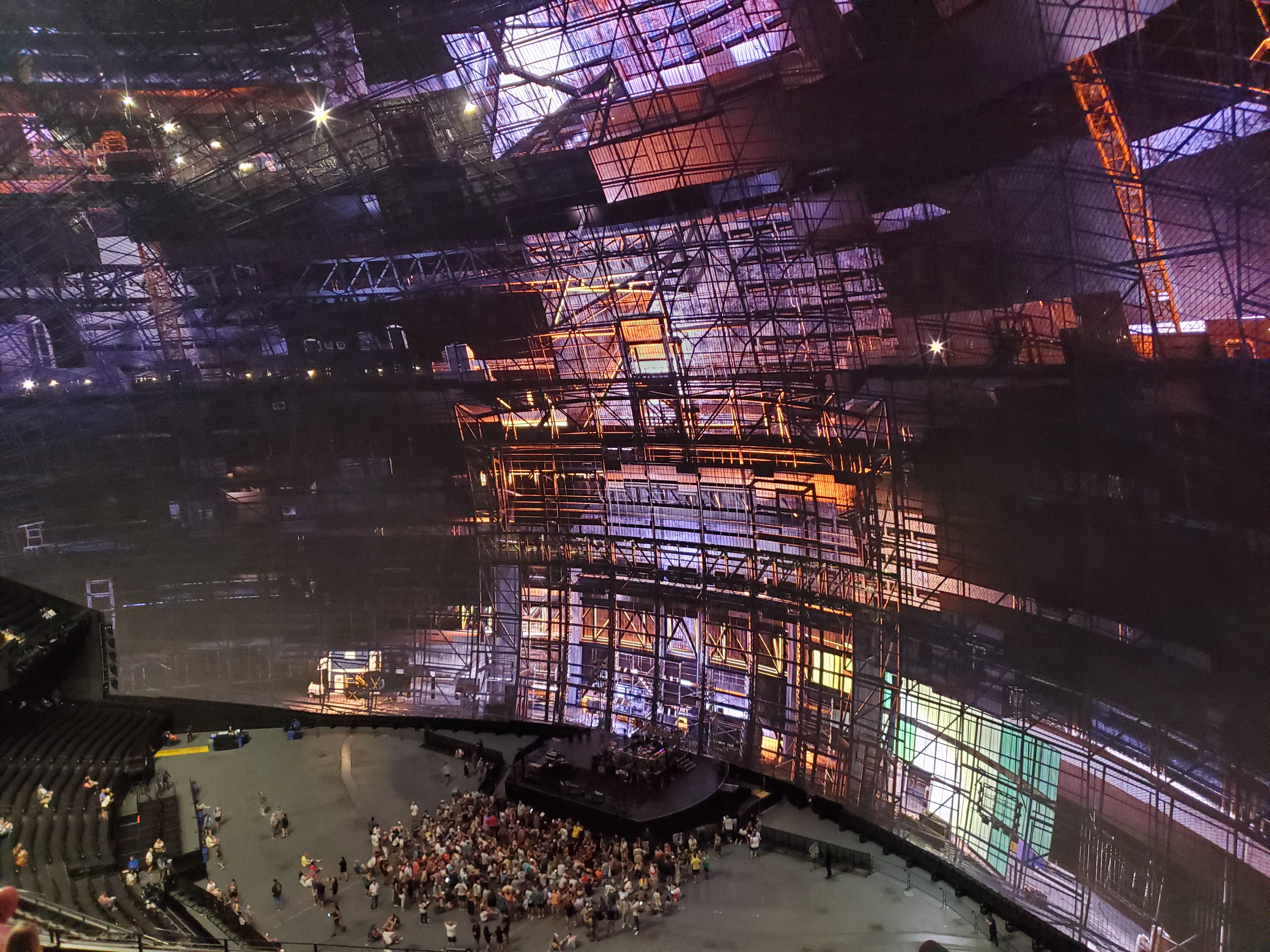
The pre-show visuals showed steel framework

Each concert of the residency began and ended with the same visual scene displayed. As concertgoers entered Sphere, the LED screen displayed steel framework that appeared to be the interior of the venue. After playing their opening song in this setting, the steel framework would slide open to place the viewer in front of the Grateful Dead's old house on 710 Ashbury Street in modern-day San Francisco. As the second song began, the viewer would "fly" directly upward above the city into space. At the conclusion of each show, the Earth would reappear into view as the viewers "descend" back down Ashbury house, this time in a 1967 setting. Finally, audio from a news reel introducing the Grateful Dead would play, followed by the words "Dead Forever" flashing on the screen. The band would then play an encore to a displayed montage of Grateful Dead band photos.

Both legs of the residency saw no repeated visuals within a single show, but some visuals were repeated across different shows throughout the weekend.

Due to Sphere's dome structure and its advanced spatial audio system, band members relied on in-ear monitors, a career first for rhythm guitarist Bob Weir.

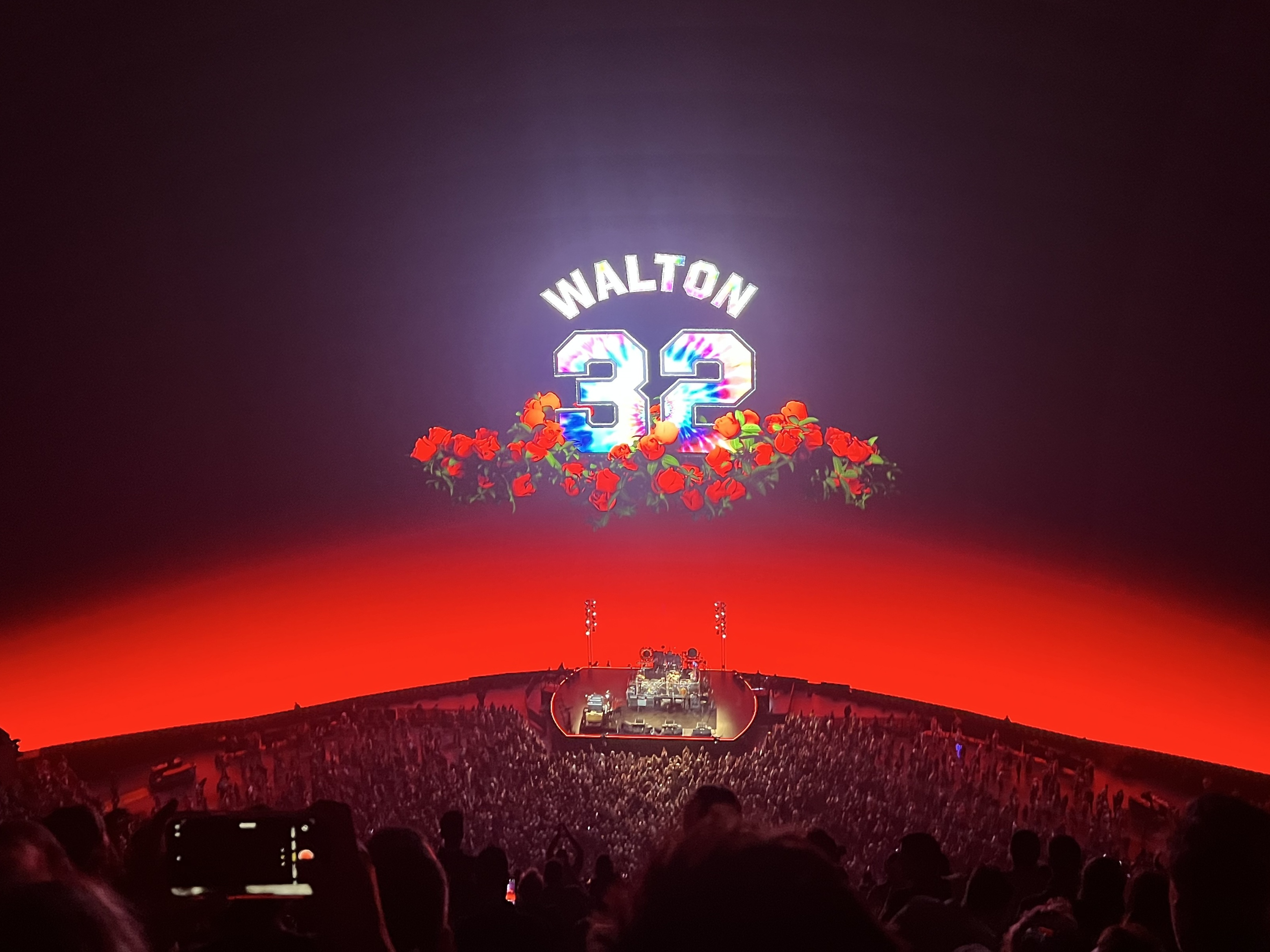
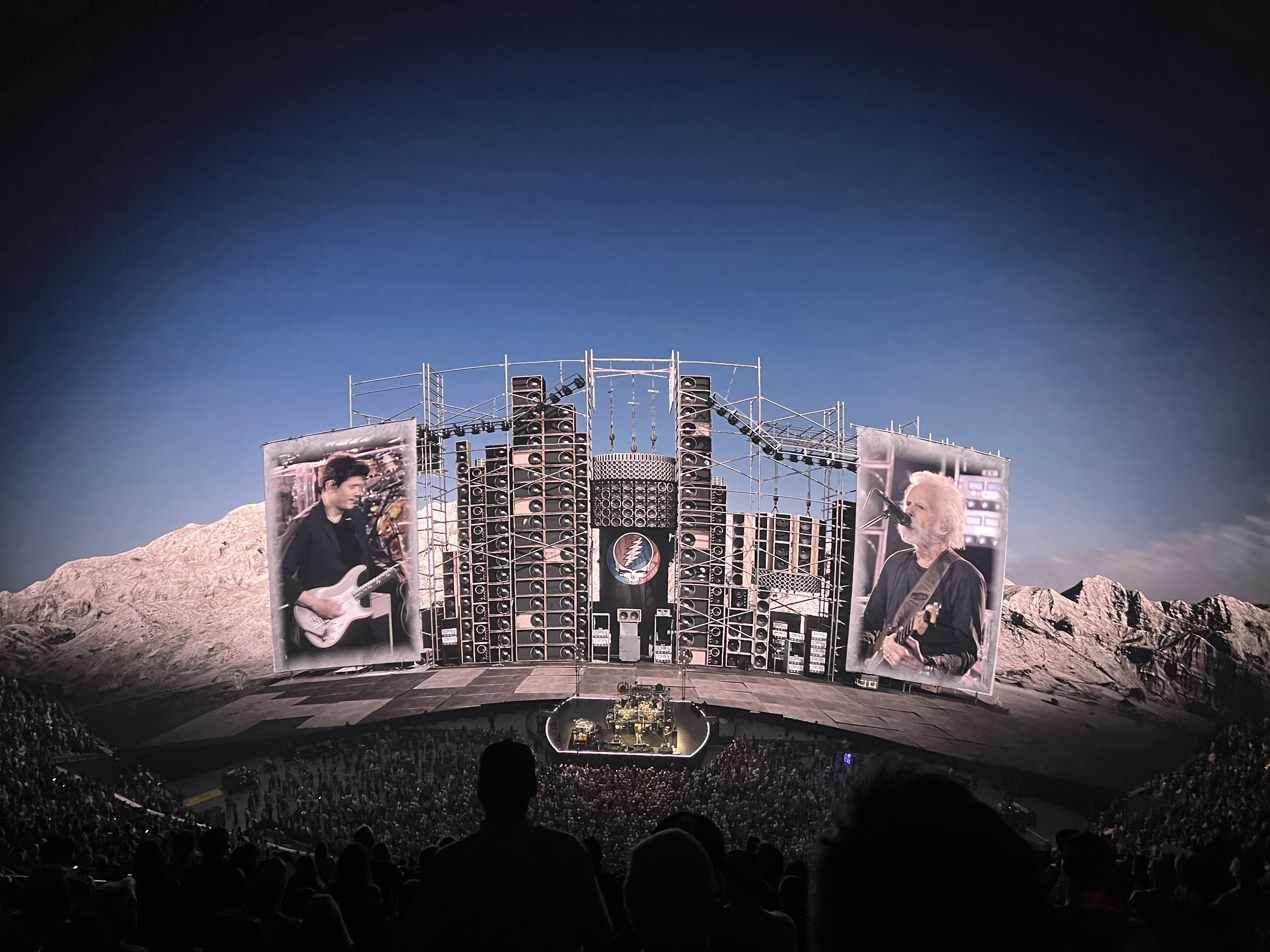
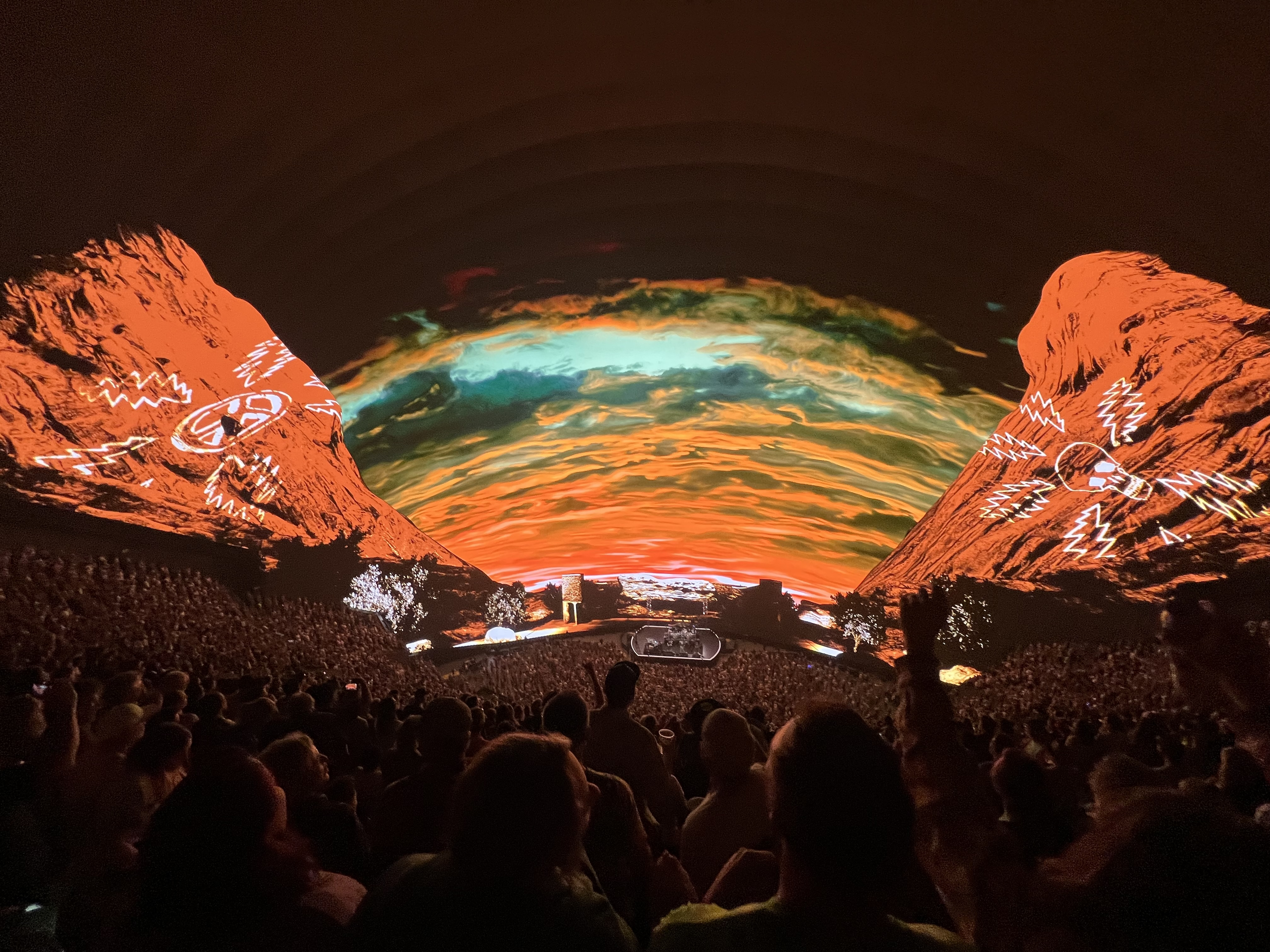
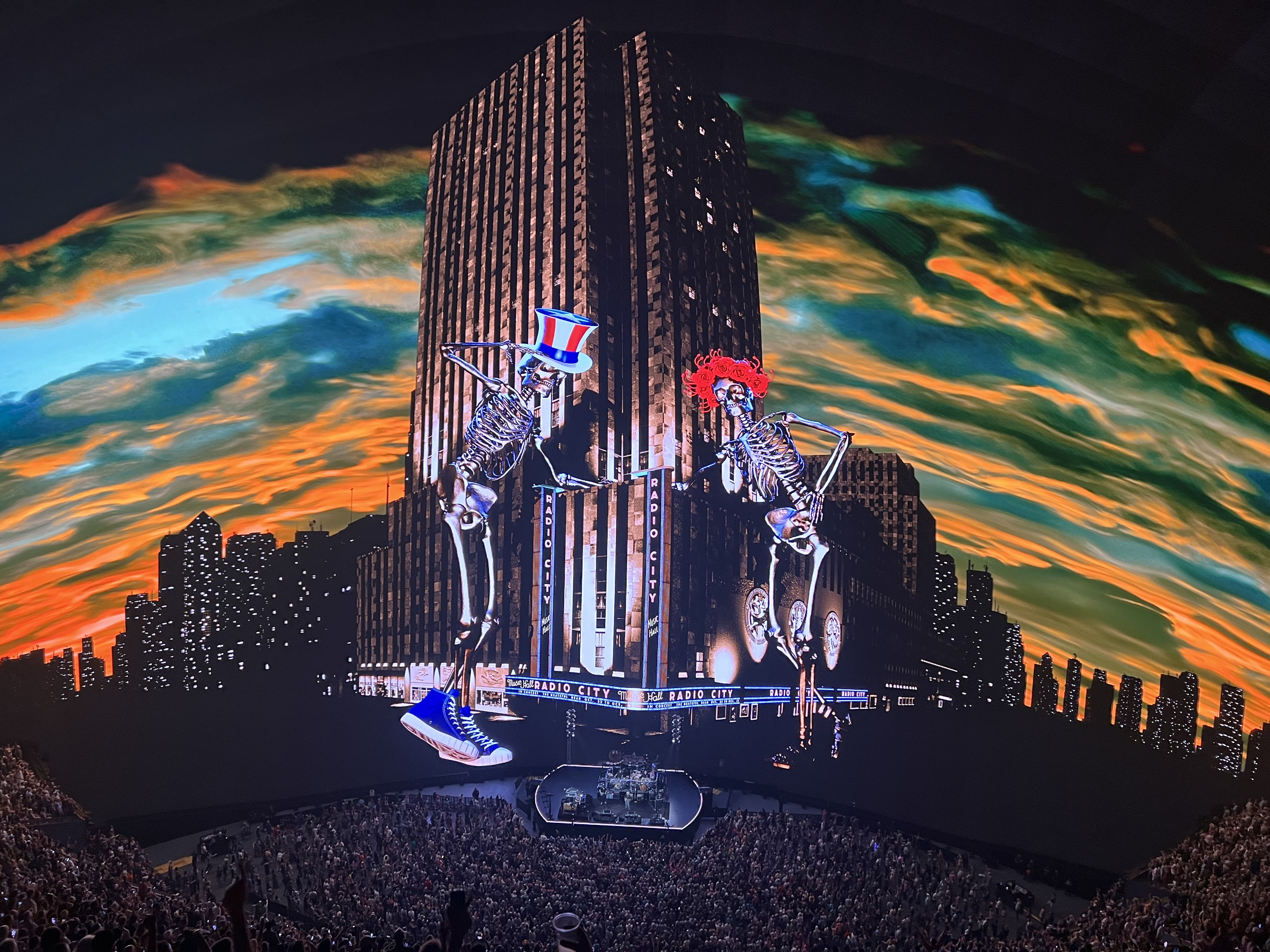
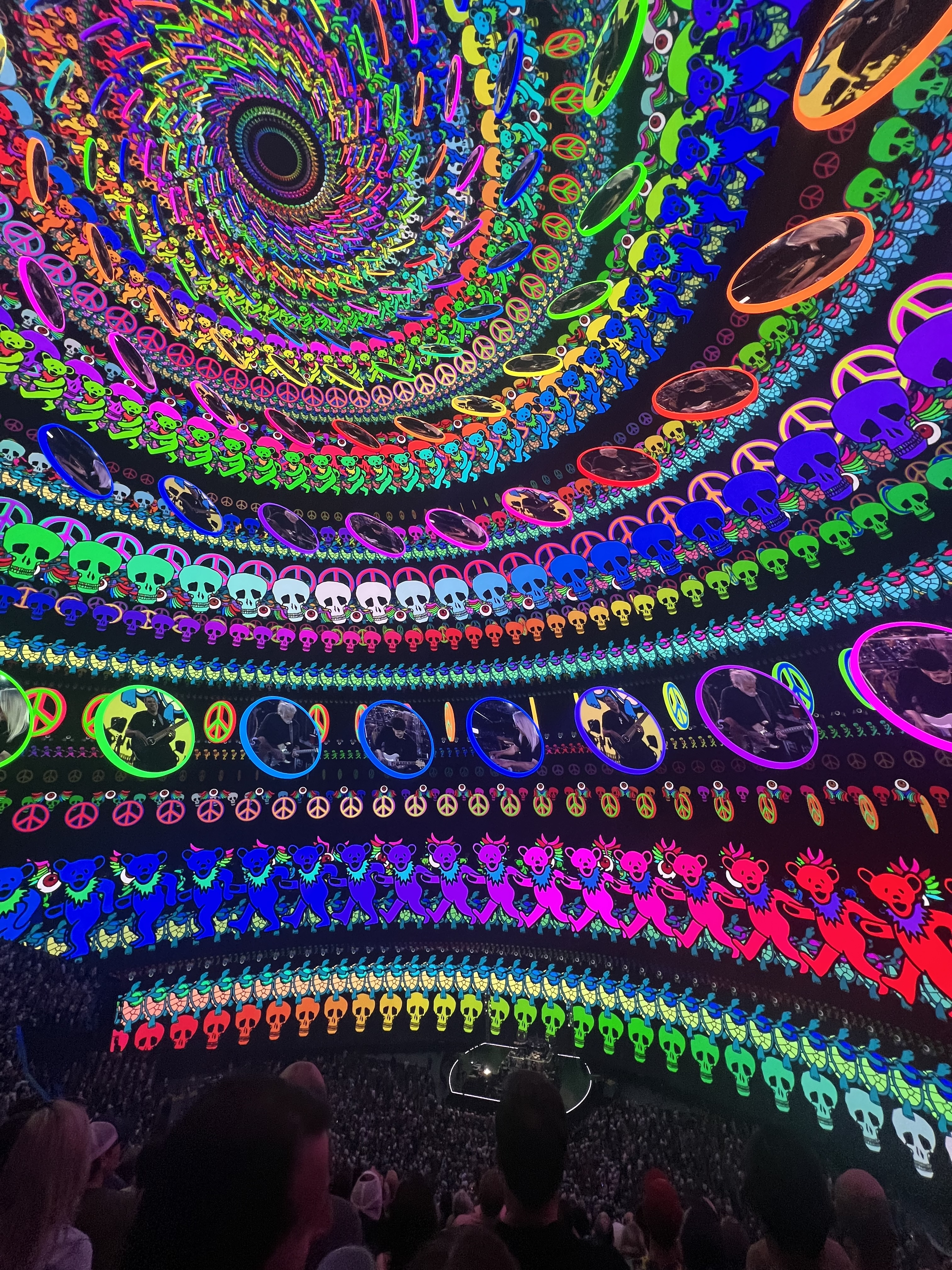
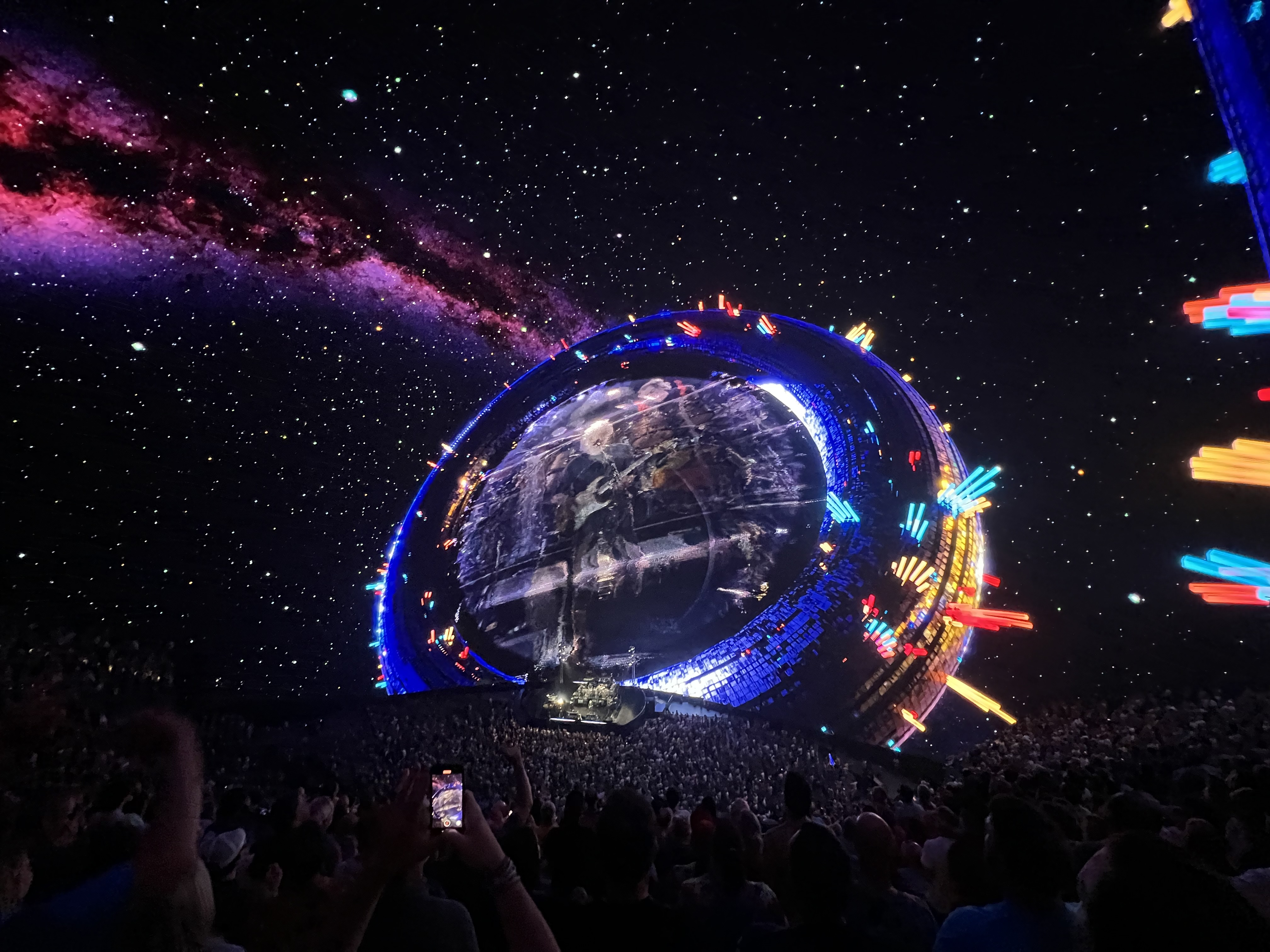
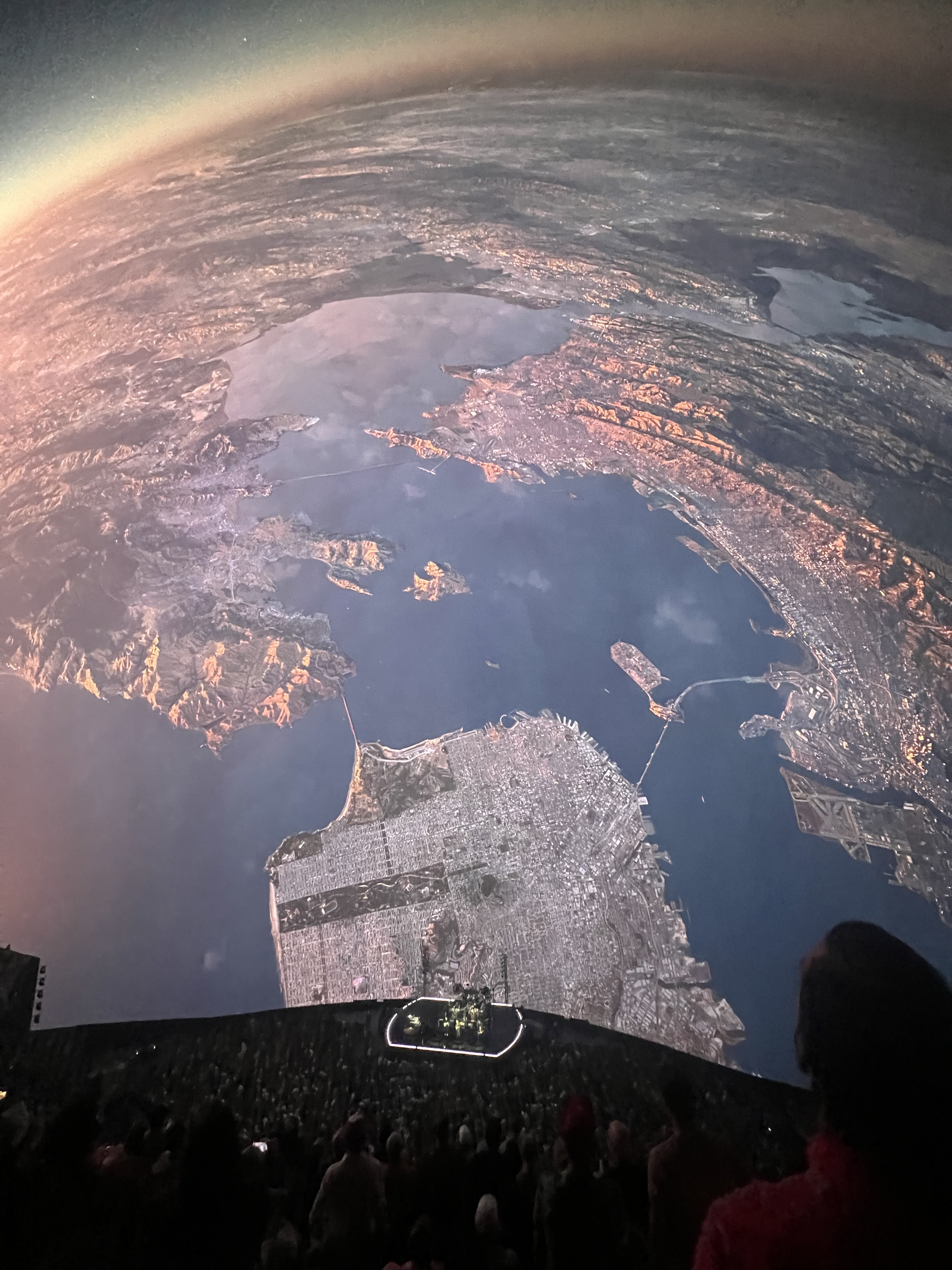
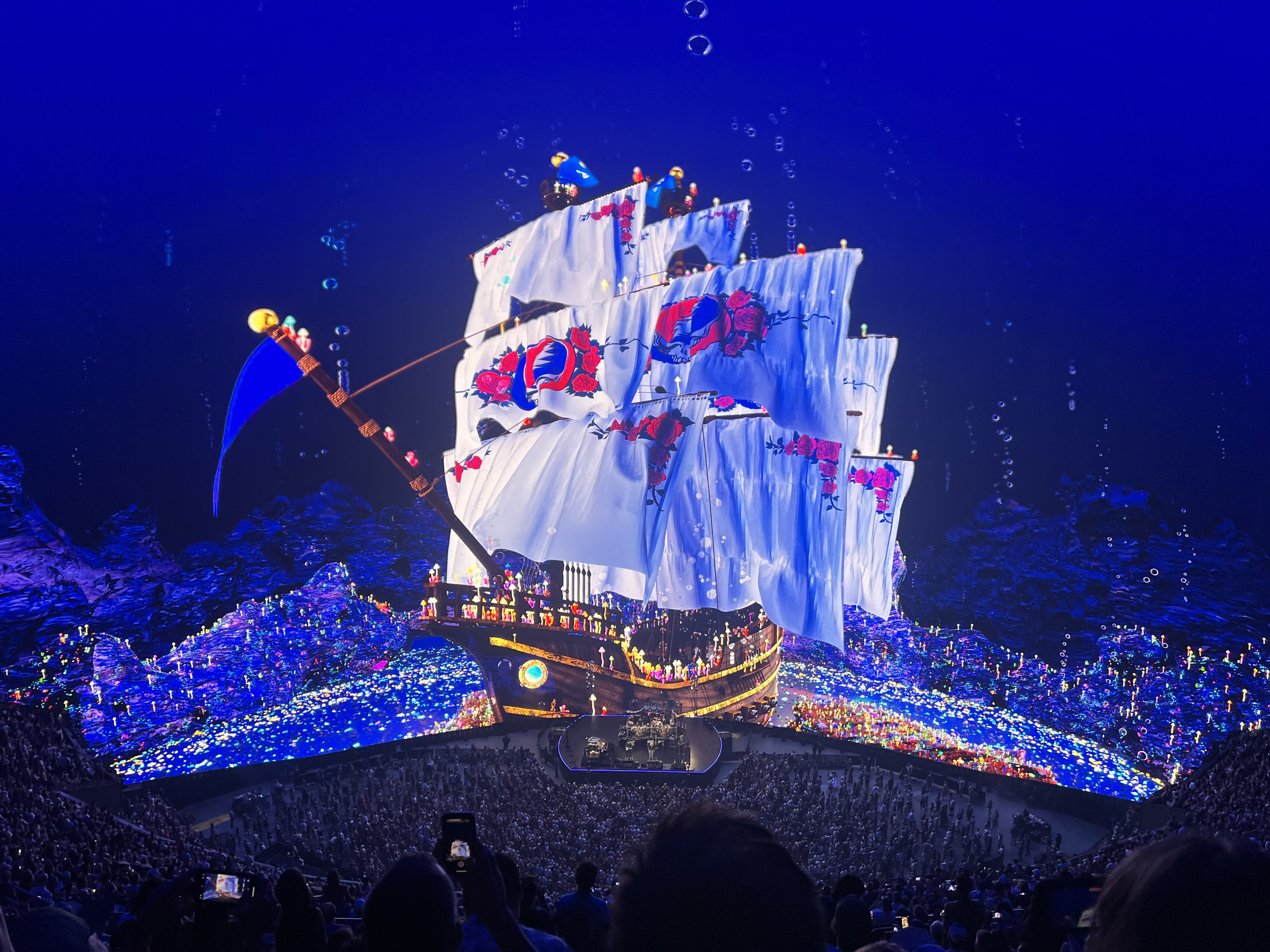
Visuals displayed during the first leg of the residency, 2024.

=== Leg 1 (2024) ===
Dead Forever: Live at Sphere was initially announced as a single-leg 24-show residency due to begin on May 16, 2024, and conclude on July 13. Shortly after its initial announcement, it was extended to 30 shows set to conclude on August 10.

Over 20 unique visual sequences were produced for the first leg of the residency. These included a paint by number cartoon landscape, a sunken sailboat, a desert landscape with Spaghetti Western style film credits, and a kaleidoscope spiral with peace symbols and the Grateful Dead's "dancing bear" icons. Other sequences depict a time-lapse construction of the Wall of Sound, the motorcycle-riding Uncle Sam skeleton featured in The Grateful Dead Movie, and a moving tour that takes concertgoers through iconic venues frequented by the Grateful Dead including Red Rocks Amphitheater, Winterland Ballroom, Barton Hall, Radio City Music Hall, and Madison Square Garden.

On May 30, the band paid tribute to basketball player and well-known deadhead Bill Walton, who had died three days prior. Walton's jersey number, 32, adorned with red roses, was displayed on the venue's screens throughout the night, and band members affixed stickers of his number to their instruments. The show's encore, "Fire on the Mountain", was a favorite of Walton's. As the band finished the show, images of Walton with members of the Grateful Dead were displayed.

=== Leg 2 (2025) ===
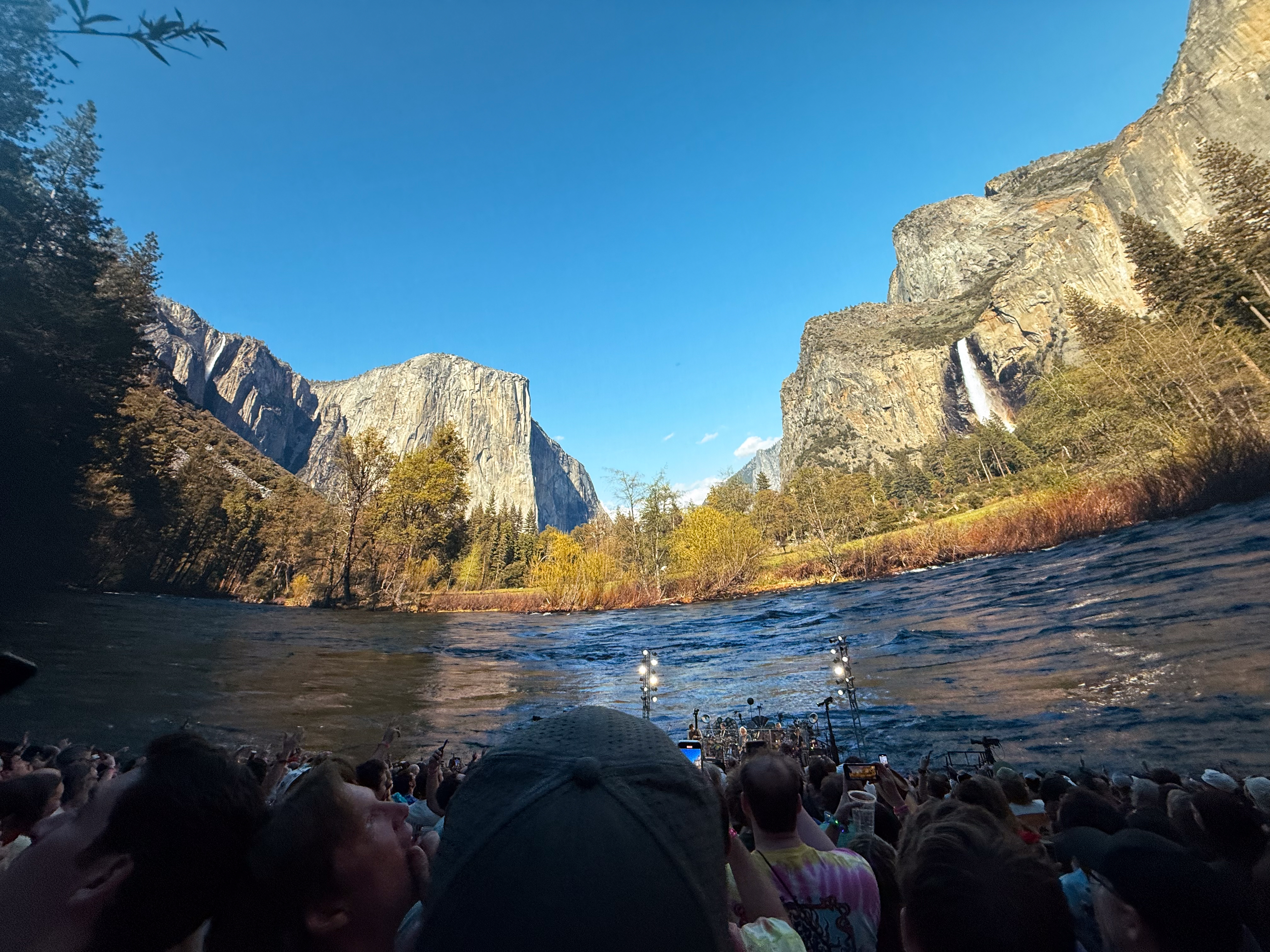
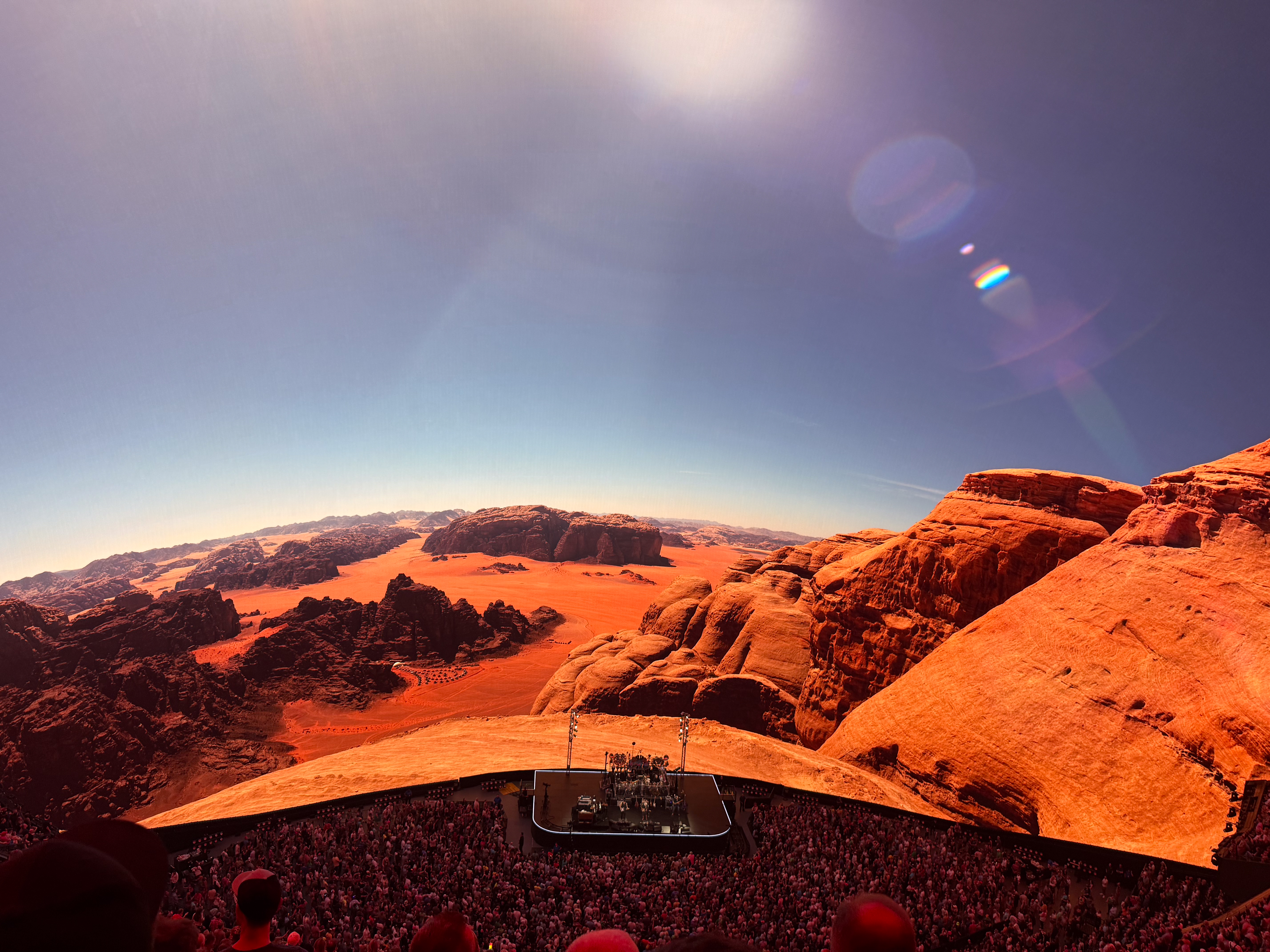
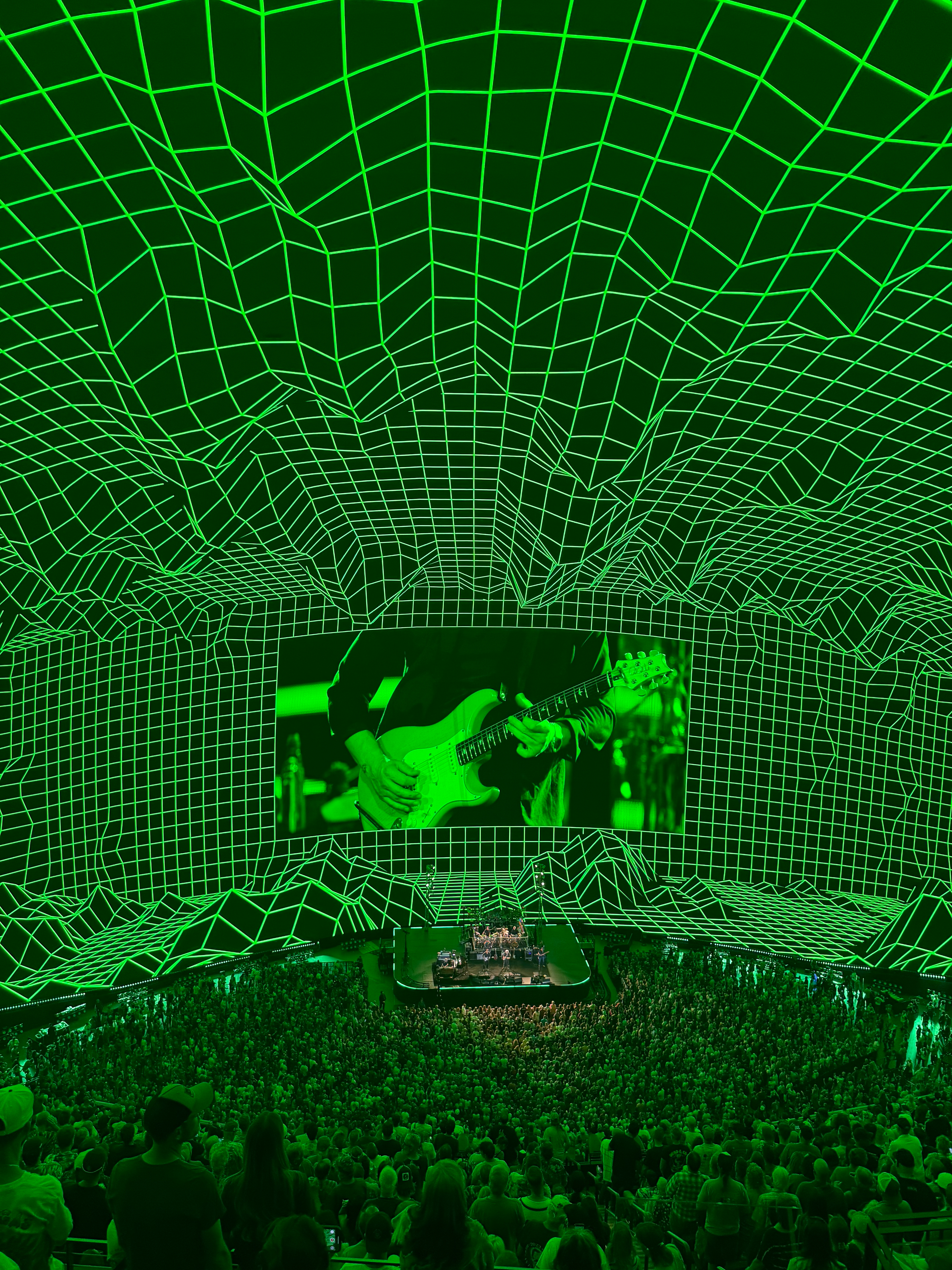
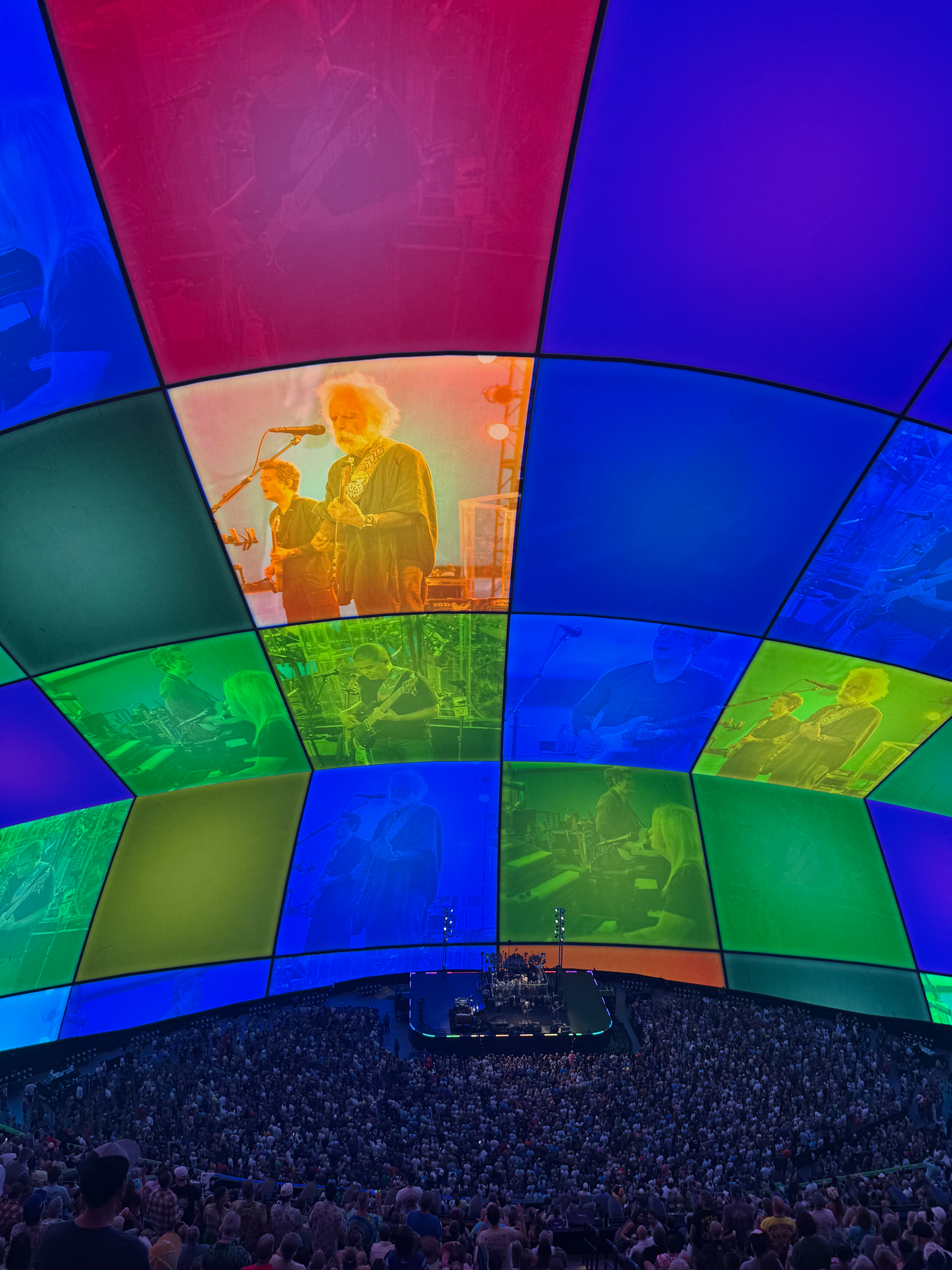
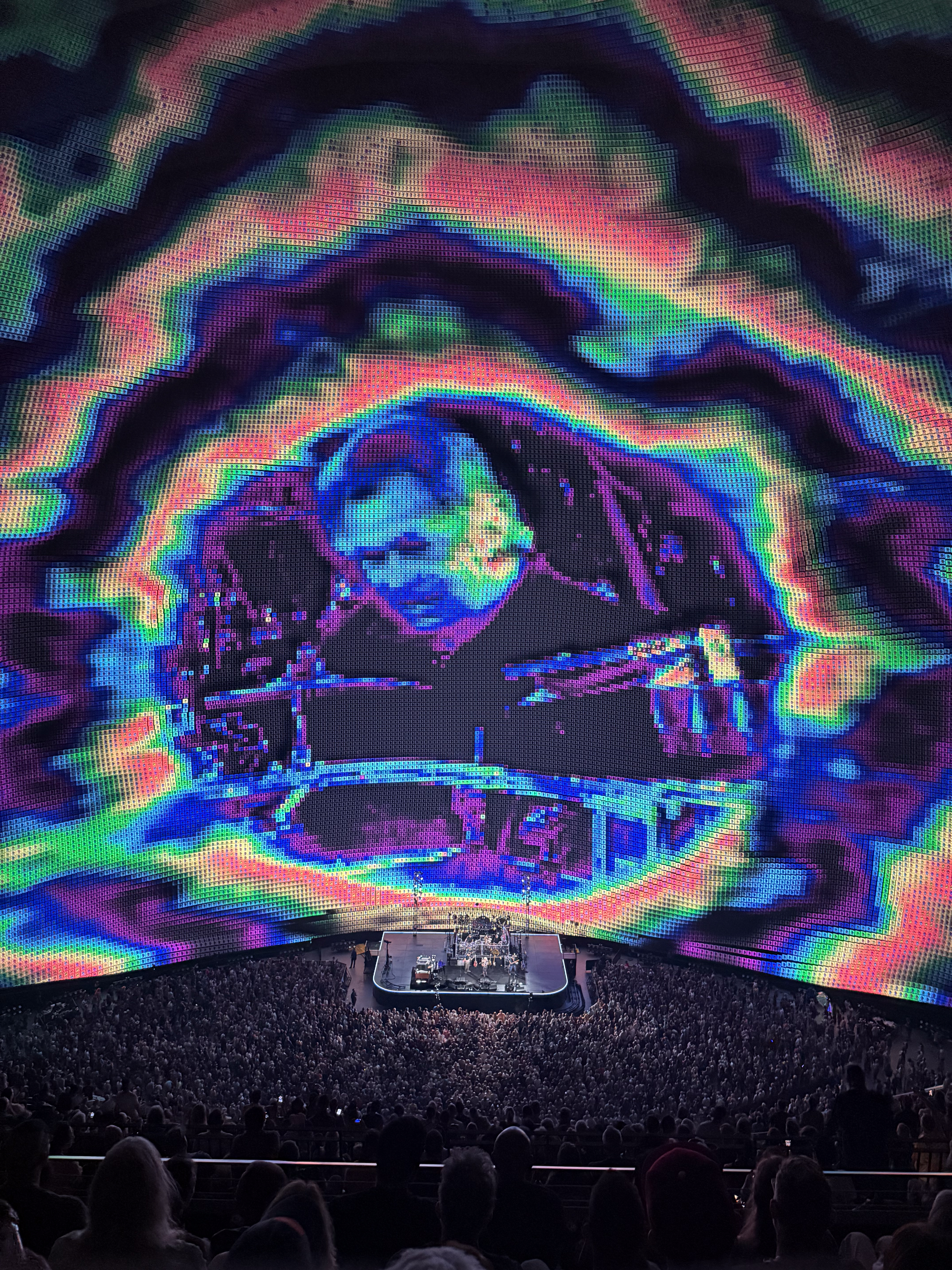
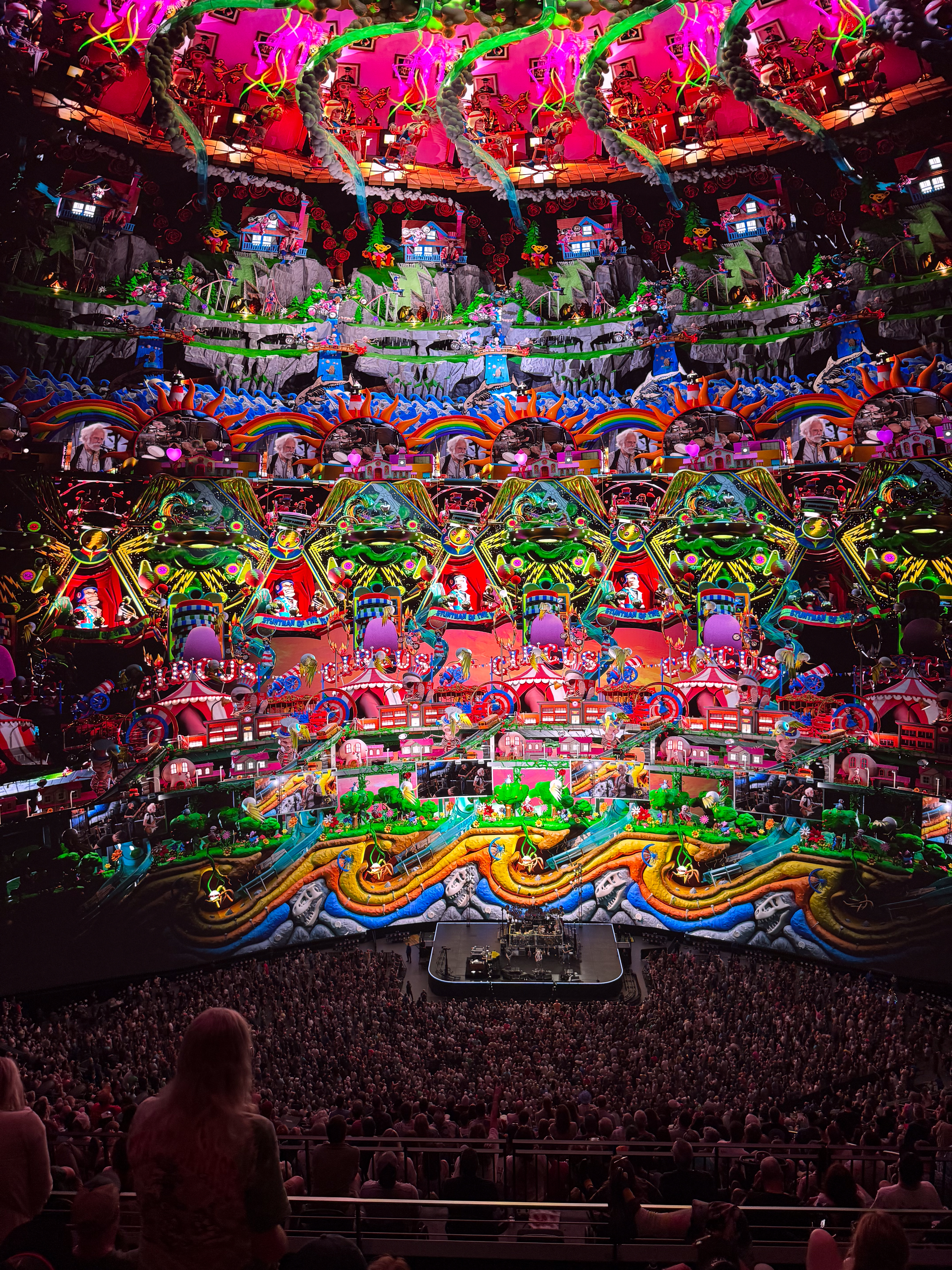
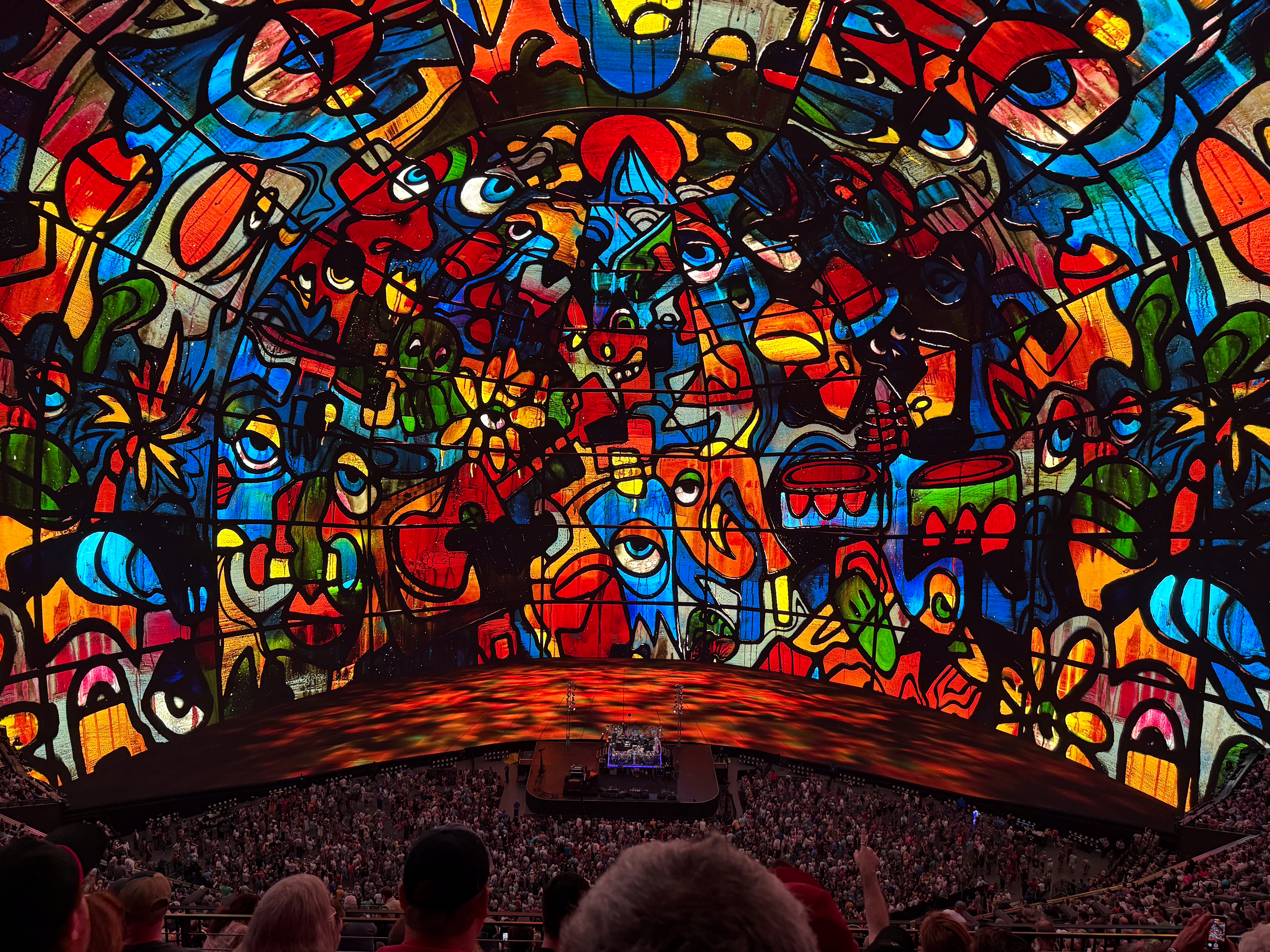
New visuals displayed during the second leg of the residency, 2025.

The second leg of the residency saw the introduction of 20 new visual displays, including the Grateful Dead's "dancing bear" icons displayed on blotter paper, a neon green vector graphic resembling early coin-operated video games, a display of Grateful Dead themed neon signs, the Yosemite Valley, a stained glass mural, and dancing characters from the rear cover of the Grateful Dead's From the Mars Hotel album packaging. Additionally, the second leg featured an elaborate ‘system failure’ prank graphic designed to make it look as though the Sphere's visual display had crashed and was rebooting mid-performance.

Throughout the residency, the band made several tributes to founding Grateful Dead bassist Phil Lesh, who died in October 2024. On opening night of the second leg, the band debuted their version of the Spencer Davis Group's "Gimme Some Lovin'," a song Lesh famously sang as a duet with the late Brent Mydland. Throughout the opening weekend, instead of the usual “newscaster” voiceover played between the landing and the encore, the crowd heard audio of Lesh speaking in a 2010 TV interview with Tucker Carlson. The interview clip was also reprised during the residency's final show in May. The band also performed "Box of Rain," Lesh's signature composition, during the second night of the opening weekend.

Visual tributes to Lesh included vintage photos of him interspersed with images of Jerry Garcia, which expanded on the prior year's visuals which had featured only Garcia. At the conclusion of each concert, Lesh's silhouette appeared in the closing graphic of the Haight-Ashbury house.

Opera singer Renée Fleming joined the group during a performance of the group's performance of "Space" on April 18.

The second leg of the residency represented some of the final performances made by founding member Bob Weir prior to his death in January 2026.

== Dead Forever Experience ==
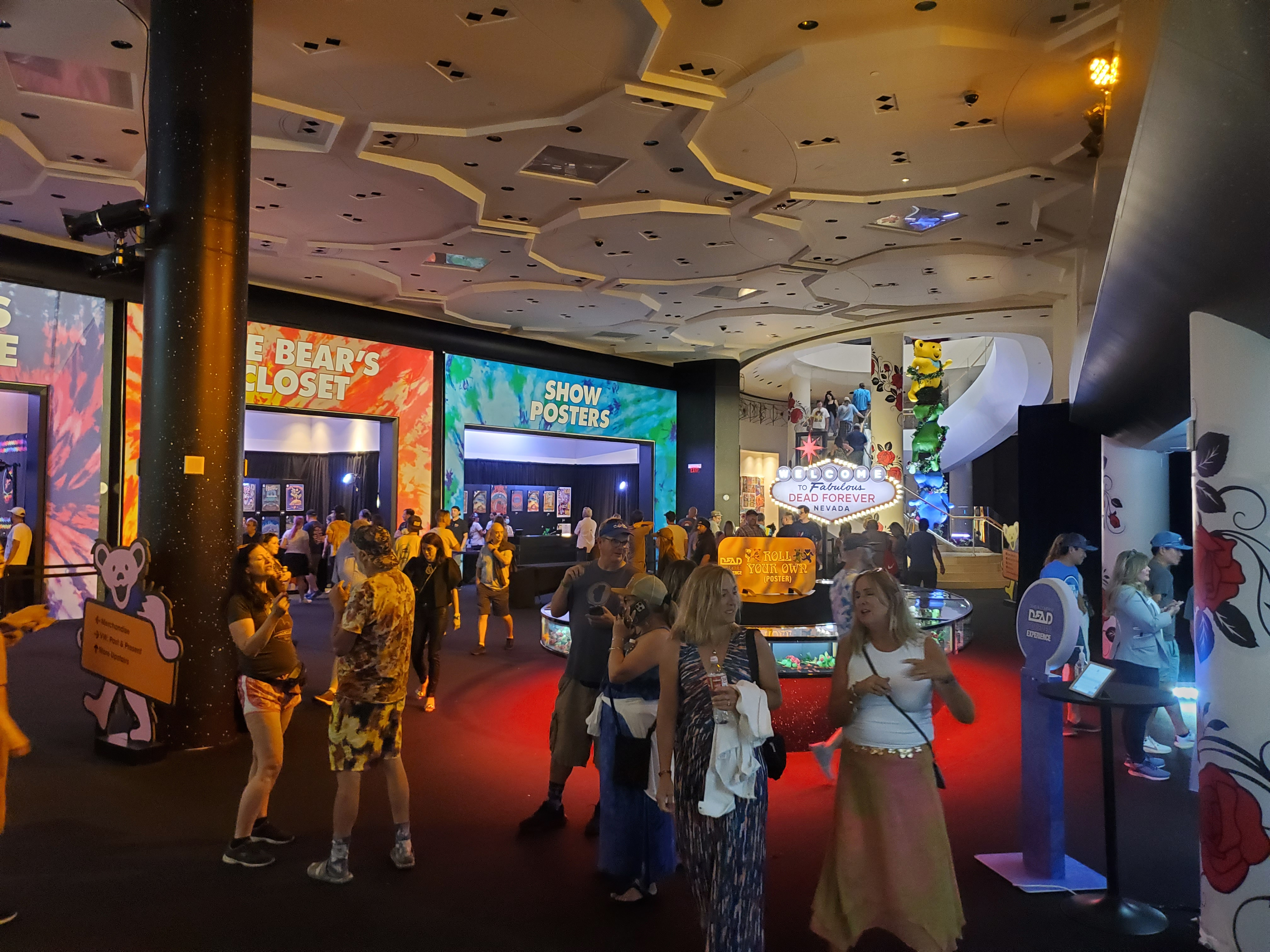
The Dead Forever Experience, a temporary exhibit at the Venetian

Destination experience company Vibee produced a 30,000 square foot, free pop-up exhibit named the "Dead Forever Experience" in the Venetian resort for the entirety of the residency's first leg, drawing over 200,000 visitors. The exhibit featured a one-fourth scale model of the Wall of Sound, a gallery of drummer Mickey Hart's art, archivists David Lemieux's concert tape collection, Participation Row, a Sirius XM Studio, dedicated poster shop, and a gallery of Grateful Dead tour photos spanning from 1965 to 1995. Additionally, fans who purchased a VIP package could view a performance of the band's 2023 performance at Cornell University. The exhibit also served as a merchandise store and cocktail bar with speciality Grateful Dead themed drinks.

During the second leg of the residency, the exhibit was scaled back significantly in size, serving only as a pop-up store without any of the exhibits from the prior year.

== Reception ==
The residency has been positively received by both fans and critics. The combination of the band's performance and Sphere's cutting-edge visuals and audio technology was frequently highlighted as a standout feature of the residency. Reviewers commended the immersive experience, with some noting the innovative use of spatial audio and the unique visual storytelling that accompanied each performance. The residency was celebrated for its fresh approach to the band's classic music and its ability to captivate both longtime fans and newcomers.

The first leg of the Dead Forever: Live at Sphere residency ranks as the 10th-highest-grossing concert residency of all time, with gross revenues of $131,449,777 from 476,945 tickets sold.

Dead Forever's first leg won the Residency of the Year award at the 2025 Pollstar Awards.

== Future ==
Following the residency's first leg, rhythm guitarists Bob Weir expressed interest in returning to Sphere for future performances.

Weir also expressed interest in releasing recordings from the residency in the form of a virtual reality film.

On May 21, 2025, following the conclusion of the residency's second leg, the band announced they would play three concerts in August 2025 at San Francisco's historic Golden Gate Park to commemorate the Grateful Dead's 60th anniversary. The concert series featured special guest performance from Billy Strings, Sturgill Simpson (as his alter ego Johnny Blue Skies), the Trey Anastasio Band, and Grahame Lesh, the son of the late Phil Lesh.

On October 23, 2025, the Grateful Dead's annual "Almanac" publication teased a potential return to Sphere in 2026 for a third leg of the residency.

In January 2026, founding member Bob Weir died, making a third leg of the residency unlikely.

== Musicians ==
- Bob Weir – rhythm guitar, lead/backing vocals
- Mickey Hart – drums, percussion
- John Mayer – lead guitar, lead/backing vocals
- Oteil Burbridge – bass guitar, percussion, lead/backing vocals
- Jeff Chimenti – keyboards, backing vocals
- Jay Lane – percussion

Karl Perazzo of Santana made a guest appearance playing percussion on May 18, 2024. Soprano opera singer Renée Fleming made a guest appearance on April 18, 2025.

== Concert dates ==
Concert dates for Dead Forever: Live at Sphere
Date	Tickets Sold	Revenue
Leg 1
May 16, 2024	50,275	$13,405,599
May 17, 2024	50,275	$13,405,599
May 18, 2024	50,275	$13,405,599
May 24, 2024	45,698	$13,652,570
May 25, 2024	45,698	$13,652,570
May 26, 2024	45,698	$13,652,570
May 30, 2024	46,827	$14,053,174
May 31, 2024	46,827	$14,053,174
June 1, 2024	46,827	$14,053,174
June 6, 2024	48,719	$15,496,090
June 7, 2024	48,719	$15,496,090
June 8, 2024	48,719	$15,496,090
June 13, 2024	48,481	$14,822,754
June 14, 2024	48,481	$14,822,754
June 15, 2024	48,481	$14,822,754
June 20, 2024	49,327	$15,206,022
June 21, 2024	49,327	$15,206,022
June 22, 2024	49,327	$15,206,022
July 4, 2024	45,026	$11,553,939
July 5, 2024	45,026	$11,553,939
July 6, 2024	45,026	$11,553,939
July 11, 2024	49,289	$13,751,961
July 12, 2024	49,289	$13,751,961
July 13, 2024	49,289	$13,751,961
August 1, 2024	45,427	$9,587,390
August 2, 2024	45,427	$9,587,390
August 3, 2024	45,427	$9,587,390
August 8, 2024	47,876	$9,920,278
August 9, 2024	47,876	$9,920,278
August 10, 2024	47,876	$9,920,278
Total	476,945	$131,449,777
Leg 2
March 20, 2025	—	—
March 21, 2025	—	—
March 22, 2025	—	—
March 27, 2025	—	—
March 28, 2025	—	—
March 29, 2025	—	—
April 17, 2025	—	—
April 18, 2025	—	—
April 19, 2025	—	—
April 24, 2025	—	—
April 25, 2025	—	—
April 26, 2025	—	—
May 9, 2025	—	—
May 10, 2025	—	—
May 11, 2025	—	—
May 15, 2025	—	—
May 16, 2025	—	—
May 17, 2025	—	—

The band also played a private one-set performance at Hewlett Packard Enterprise's 2024 Discover Conference at Sphere on June 19, 2024.

== See also ==
- Reunions of the Grateful Dead
- List of highest-grossing concert series at a single venue
