= Dead & Company Summer Tour 2022 =

2022 concert tour by Dead & Company

- Tour by Dead & Company
- Location: United States
- Start date: June 11, 2022
- End date: July 16, 2022
- Legs: 1
- No. of shows: 20

Dead & Company concert chronology
- Dead & Company 2021 Tour; Dead & Company Summer Tour 2022; Dead & Company Summer Tour 2023

Dead & Company Summer Tour 2022 was a concert tour by the American rock band Dead & Company, consisting of former Grateful Dead members Bob Weir, Bill Kreutzmann, and Mickey Hart, alongside John Mayer, Oteil Burbridge, and Jeff Chimenti. The tour was originally scheduled to comprise 20 concerts across 16 cities, beginning on June 11, and concluding on July 16. 2022.

The band was due to play two weekend shows at the Moon Palace resort in Cancún, Mexico, earlier in the year but had to cancel due to the global COVID-19 pandemic.

Citing health reasons, percussionist Bill Kreutzmann was sporadically replaced by Jay Lane for several shows throughout the tour. The tour was Kreutzmann's last with the band, being replaced full time by Lane the following year.

On July 6, the band cancelled their scheduled performance at the Saratoga Performing Arts Center in Saratoga Springs, New York, due to Mayer's father's health.

== Tour dates ==
Concert Dates for Dead & Company Summer Tour 2022
Date	City	Venue	Tickets Sold	Revenue
June 11, 2022	Los Angeles	Dodger Stadium	24,039	$3,426,211
June 13, 2022	Mountain View	Shoreline Amphitheatre	33,067	$3,521,083
June 14, 2022	Mountain View	Shoreline Amphitheatre	33,067	$3,521,083
June 17, 2022	Boulder	Folsom Field	55,601	$6,112,360
June 18, 2022	Boulder	Folsom Field	55,601	$6,112,360
June 21, 2022	Maryland Heights	Hollywood Casino Amphitheatre	11,524	$1,093,585
June 22, 2022	Cincinnati	Riverbend Music Center	13,354	$1,308,362
June 24, 2022	Chicago	Wrigley Field	54,288	$7,234,234
June 25, 2022	Chicago	Wrigley Field	54,288	$7,234,234
June 28, 2022	Noblesville	Ruoff Music Center	14,285	$1,226,639
June 29, 2022	Clarkston	Pine Knob Music Theatre	11,200	$1,248,304
July 1, 2022	Bethel	Bethel Woods Center for the Arts	15,438	$1,891,612
July 2, 2022	Foxborough	Gillette Stadium	19,889	$2,551,570
July 5, 2022	Hartford	The Xfinity Theatre	14,537	$1,428,189
July 6, 2022	Saratoga Springs	Saratoga Performing Arts Center	Show cancelled	
July 8, 2022	Bristow	Jiffy Lube Live	19,325	$1,929,578
July 10, 2022	Philadelphia	Citizens Bank Park	31,313	$3,609,596
July 12, 2022	Burgettstown	The Pavilion at Star Lake	13,865	$1,252,757
July 15, 2022	Queens	Citi Field	60,803	$8,109,870
July 16, 2022	Queens	Citi Field	60,803	$8,109,870

On July 6, the band was scheduled to play at the Saratoga Performing Arts Center in Saratoga Springs, New York, but had to cancel due to Mayer's father's ill health.

== Musicians ==
- Bob Weir – rhythm guitar, lead/backing vocals
- Bill Kreutzmann – percussion
- Mickey Hart – drums, percussion
- John Mayer – lead guitar, lead/backing vocals
- Oteil Burbridge – bass guitar, percussion, lead/backing vocals
- Jeff Chimenti – keyboards, backing vocals

Jay Lane regularly stood in for Kreutzmann throughout the tour.

== See also ==
- Reunions of the Grateful Dead
