= Dead & Company Summer Tour 2023 =

2023 concert tour by Dead & Company

- Tour by Dead & Company
- Location: United States
- Start date: May 19, 2023
- End date: July 15, 2023
- Legs: 1
- No. of shows: 29
- Attendance: 845,411
- Box office: $114,843,965

Dead & Company concert chronology
- Dead & Company Summer Tour 2022; Dead & Company Summer Tour 2023; Dead Forever: Live at Sphere

Dead & Company Summer Tour 2023 (billed as "The Final Tour") was the tenth and final concert tour by the American rock band Dead & Company. The nationwide tour comprised 29 concerts spanning from May to July 2023.

Upon its announcement, it was confirmed to be the band's final tour. It also marked the first full tour without founding member Bill Kreutzmann. It began on May 19 in Inglewood, California, and concluded on July 16, in San Francisco. Prior to the tour's start, the band headlined the 2023 New Orleans Jazz & Heritage Festival

== Overview ==
On September 23, 2022, Dead & Company announced their next summer tour would be their last. The following month, the band announced the tour would consist of 29 shows beginning on May 19.

In April 2023, the band announced founding member Bill Kreutzmann would be departing the group and replaced by Jay Lane. Lane previously stood in for Kreutzmann during the 2022 summer tour. In the announcement, the band reassured fans of Kreutzmann's health and cited "a shift in creative direction" as the reason for his departure.

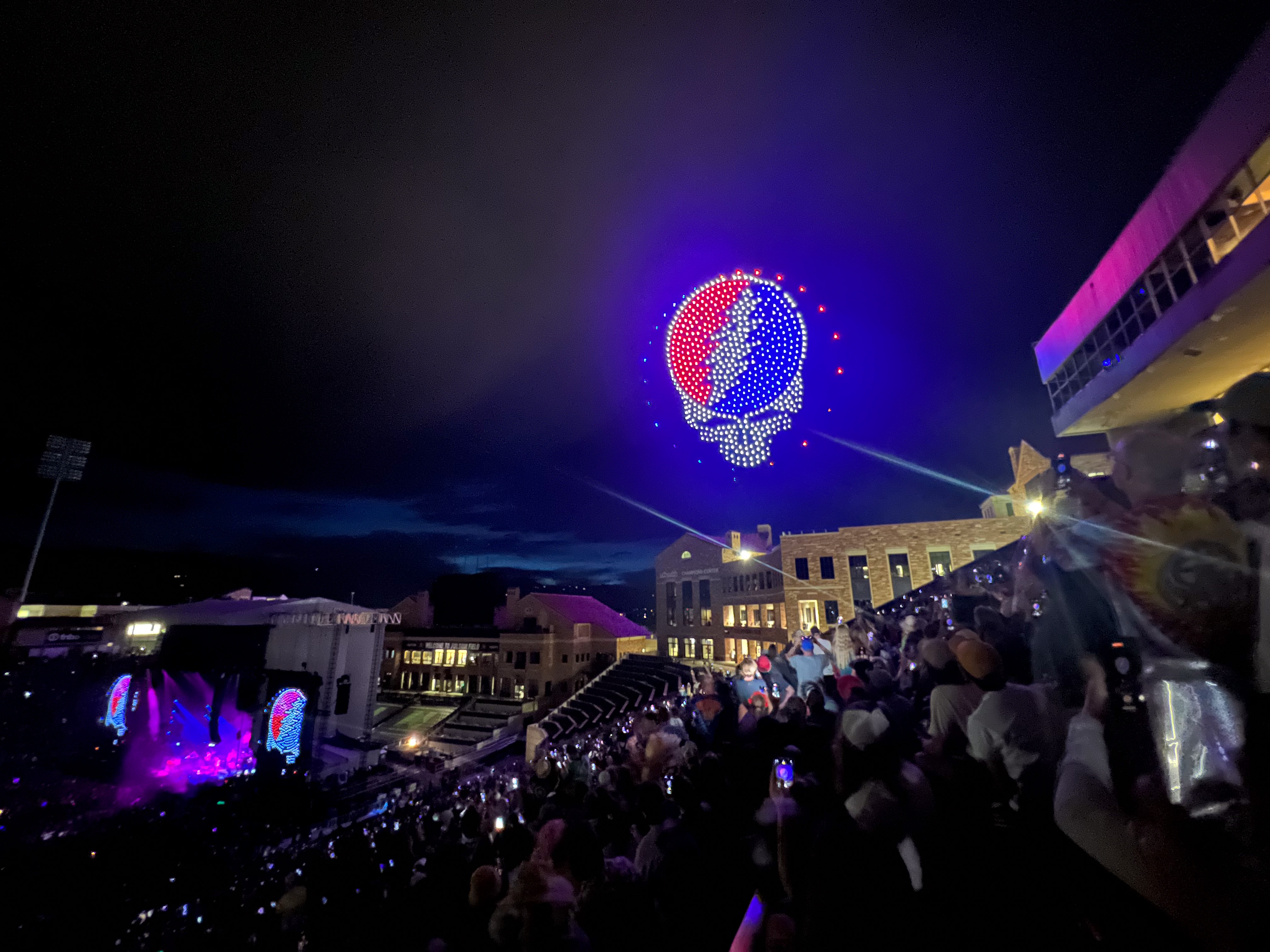
Grateful Dead "stealie" logo displayed with drones over Folsom Field, July 3, 2023

The tour began on May 19 at the Kia Forum in Inglewood, California.

The third and final concert at Folsom Field in Boulder featured two drone shows during the concert's second set which displayed the Grateful Dead's "stealie" logo and marching bear icons. At the same concert, Dave Matthews joined the band to play covers of "All Along the Watchtower", "Not Fade Away," "Knockin' on Heaven's Door," and "The Weight."

The tour concluded on July 16 at Oracle Park in San Francisco. The final show also featured a drone display similar to the one in Boulder.

== Reception ==
The tour was widely praised by fans and critics alike with Mayer's skillful guitar work being particularly lauded. Lane's inclusion as a full-time member was also well received.

The tour grossed $115 million off of 845,000 tickets sold, making it the band's most successful tour.

== Future ==
Speculation of the band's dissolution circulated upon the tour's conclusion. In an interview with ABC, drummer Mickey Hart reassured fans of potential future shows saying, "It's not final anything. We never said we'll never play again, but we'll never tour again."

In February 2024, the band announced they would be performing a concert residency at Sphere in Las Vegas, Nevada. Dead Forever: Live at Sphere consisted of 30 shows, spanning from May 16 to August 10, 2024.

== Tour dates ==
Concert Dates for Dead & Company Summer Tour 2023
Date	City	Venue	Tickets Sold	Revenue
May 19, 2023	Inglewood	Kia Forum	28,346	$5,282,997
May 20, 2023	Inglewood	Kia Forum	28,346	$5,282,997
May 23, 2023	Phoenix	Talking Stick Resort Amphitheatre	18,720	$2,386,430
May 26, 2023	Dallas	Dos Equis Pavilion	19,690	$2,558,782
May 28, 2023	Atlanta	Cellairis Amphitheatre	18,797	$2,323,775
May 30, 2023	Charlotte	PNC Music Pavilion	18,576	$2,393,344
June 1, 2023	Raleigh	Coastal Credit Union Park	20,180	$2,355,777
June 3, 2023	Bristow	Jiffy Lube Live	23,234	$2,930,648
June 5, 2023	Burgettstown	The Pavilion	22,919	$2,297,030
June 7, 2023	Maryland Heights	Hollywood Casino Amphitheatre	18,969	$1,996,795
June 9, 2023	Chicago	Wrigley Field	82,078	$11,730,898
June 10, 2023	Chicago	Wrigley Field	82,078	$11,730,898
June 13, 2023	Cincinnati	Riverbend Center	20,064	$2,207,226
June 15, 2023	Philadelphia	Citizens Bank Park	41,502	$6,528,618
June 17, 2023	Saratoga Springs	Saratoga Performing Arts Center	47,220	$4,992,418
June 18, 2023	Saratoga Springs	Saratoga Performing Arts Center	47,220	$4,992,418
June 21, 2023	Queens	Citi Field	73,650	$11,147,015
June 22, 2023	Queens	Citi Field	73,650	$11,147,015
June 24, 2023	Boston	Fenway Park	74,251	$11,631,108
June 25, 2023	Boston	Fenway Park	74,251	$11,631,108
June 27, 2023	Noblesville	Ruoff Center	23,919	$2,466,421
July 1, 2023	Boulder	Folsom Field	131,450	$13,371,629
July 2, 2023	Boulder	Folsom Field	131,450	$13,371,629
July 3, 2023	Boulder	Folsom Field	131,450	$13,371,629
July 7, 2023	George	The Gorge Amphitheatre	43,486	$5,828,061
July 8, 2023	George	The Gorge Amphitheatre	43,486	$5,828,061
July 14, 2023	San Francisco	Oracle Park	118,360	$20,414,993
July 15, 2023	San Francisco	Oracle Park	118,360	$20,414,993
July 16, 2023	San Francisco	Oracle Park	118,360	$20,414,993

== Musicians ==
- Bob Weir – rhythm guitar, lead/backing vocals
- Mickey Hart – drums, percussion
- John Mayer – lead guitar, lead/backing vocals
- Oteil Burbridge – bass guitar, percussion, lead/backing vocals
- Jeff Chimenti – keyboards, backing vocals
- Jay Lane – percussion

Dave Matthews played with the band for one show on July 3, 2023.

== See also ==
- Reunions of the Grateful Dead
